= The Bravery discography =

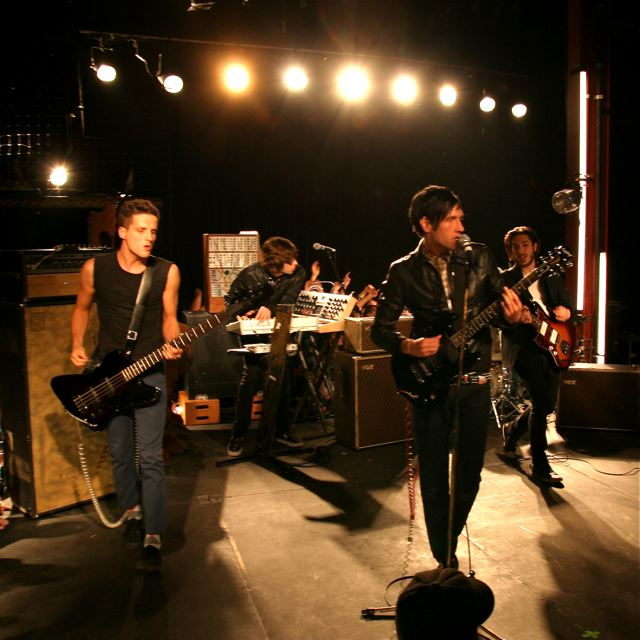
- The Bravery at the video shoot for "Believe"
- Studio albums: 3
- Live albums: 1
- Singles: 9
- Music videos: 11
- Promotional singles: 2

American rock band the Bravery has released three studio albums, one live album, one remix album, nine singles, two promotional singles, and 11 music videos.

== Albums ==
=== Studio albums ===
List of studio albums, with selected chart positions and certifications
Title	Album details	Peak chart positions								Certifications
Title	Album details	US	US Alt.	US Rock	AUS	FRA	IRL	SCO	UK	Certifications
The Bravery	Released: March 29, 2005; Label: Island; Formats: CD, LP, digital download	18	—	—	69	92	15	3	5	BPI: Gold
The Sun and the Moon	Released: May 22, 2007; Label: Island; Formats: CD, LP, digital download	24	—	7	— (Note: The Sun and the Moon did not enter the Australian ARIA Singles Chart but peaked at number 10 on the ARIA Hitseekers Chart.)	—	—	—	—	
Stir the Blood	Released: December 1, 2009; Label: Island; Formats: CD, digital download	135	19	30	—	—	—	—	—	
"—" denotes a recording that did not chart or was not released in that territory.

=== Live albums ===
List of live albums
Title	Album details
Live at the Wiltern Theater	Released: June 8, 2010; Label: Island; Formats: Digital download

=== Remix albums ===
List of remix albums
Title	Album details	US
The Sun and the Moon Complete	Released: March 18, 2008; Label: Island; Formats: CD, digital download	175

== Singles ==
List of singles, with selected chart positions and certifications, showing year released and album name
Title	Year	Peak chart positions										Certifications	Album
Title	Year	US	US Alt	US Pop	AUS	CAN Rock	EU	IRL	MEX	SCO	UK	Certifications	Album
"An Honest Mistake"	2005	97	12	75	87	—	100	33	—	6	7	BPI: Silver	The Bravery
"Fearless"	2005	—	—	—	—	—	—	—	—	39	43		The Bravery
"Unconditional"	2005	—	34	—	—	—	—	—	—	38	49		The Bravery
"Time Won't Let Me Go"	2007	— (Note: "Time Won't Let Me Go" did not chart on the Billboard Hot 100 but did peak at number 24 on the Bubbling Under Hot 100 chart, which is an extension of the Billboard Hot 100.)	10	—	—	29	—	—	—	94	— (Note: "Time Won't Let Me Go" did not enter the UK Singles Chart, but peaked at number 68 on the UK Physical Singles Chart Top 100.)		The Sun and the Moon
"Believe"	2007	— (Note: "Believe" did not chart on the Billboard Hot 100 but did peak at number 6 on the Bubbling Under Hot 100 Singles chart, which is an extension of the Billboard Hot 100.)	4	— (Note: "Believe" did not chart on the Pop 100 chart but peaked at number 24 on the Adult Pop Songs chart.)	—	30	—	—	—	—	—	RIAA: Gold	The Sun and the Moon
"Slow Poison"	2009	—	23	—	—	—	—	—	41	—	—		Stir the Blood
"I Am Your Skin"	2009	—	—	—	—	—	—	—	—	—	—		Stir the Blood
"—" denotes a recording that did not chart or was not released in that territory.

=== Promotional singles ===
List of promotional singles, showing year released and album name
Title	Year	Album
"Rocket"	2007	Non-album single
"Believe" (Moon Version)	2008	The Sun and the Moon Complete
"This Is Not The End" (Moon Version)	2008	The Sun and the Moon Complete
"Bad Sun" (Moon Version)	2008	The Sun and the Moon Complete
"The Ocean" (Moon Version)	2008	The Sun and the Moon Complete
"Hatef--k"	2009	Stir the Blood

== Music videos ==
List of music videos, showing year released and director
Title	Year	Director(s)
"Unconditional" (version 1)	2004	Tyler Oliver
"An Honest Mistake"	2005	Mike Palmieri
"Fearless"	2005	Diane Martel
"Unconditional" (version 2)	2005	Paul Gore
"No Brakes"	2006	Tyler Greco
"Time Won't Let Me Go"	2007	Brad Palmer, Brian Palmer
"Angelina"	2007	Zach Nial
"Believe"	2008	Goodtimes, Sam Endicott
"Hatef--k"	2009	Mike Hindert
"Slow Poison"	2009	Ryan Honey, Orion Tait
"Sugar Pill"	2009	Mike Hindert

== Other appearances ==
Title	Year	Album
"Ours"	2010	The Twilight Saga: Eclipse
