= List of Cleveland Panthers players =

The following people played for the Panthers for at least one game in the 1926 AFL regular season, the only one of the team's (and the league's) existence:

Name	Position	College
Norty "Mope" Behm	End^{1}	Iowa State
Cookie Cunningham	End	Ohio State
Doc Elliott	Fullback	Lafayette
Myles Evans	Tackle	Ohio Wesleyan
Billy Gribben	Tailback	Case Western Reserve
Eddie "Red" Kregenow	End	Akron
Al Michaels	Tailback	Heidelberg, Ohio State
Al Nesser^{2}	Guard^{3}	none
Dave Noble	Back^{4}	Nebraska
John Otterbacher	Guard	Ohio State
Guy Roberts	Back^{4}	Dayton
Red Roberts	Tackle	Centre
Jack Sack	Guard	Pittsburgh
Bob Spiers	Tackle^{5}	Ohio State
Al Thornburg	Center	Iowa State
Ralph Vince	Guard	Washington & Jefferson
Leo Virant	Guard	Iowa State
Red Weaver	Center	Centre
Jay Winters	Blocking back^{6}	Ohio Wesleyan
Dick Wolf	Blocking back	Miami (Ohio)

^{1} Also played fullback
^{2} Started 1926 season as coach of Akron Indians, then left to play for Panthers
^{3} Also played tackle
^{4} Played wingback and American football
^{5} Also played guard
^{6} Position currently known as quarterback
