= List of Los Angeles Wildcats players =

The following people played for the Los Angeles Wildcats for at least one game in the 1926 AFL regular season, the only one of the team's (and the league's) existence:

Name	Position	College
Jim Bradshaw	Blocking Back^{1}	Illinois, Nevada
Mal Bross	Back^{2}	Gonzaga
Ted Bucklin	Back^{3}	Idaho
Nick Busch	Guard	Gonzaga
Dana Corey	Guard	California
Walden Erickson	Tackle	Washington
Ray Flaherty	End	Gonzaga
Ted Illman	Back^{2}	Montana
Charlie Johnston	Tackle^{4}	Stanford
Jim Lawson	End	Stanford
Ed McRae	Guard	Washington
Duke Morrison	Back	California
Ram Morrison	Wingback^{5}	Oklahoma
Dick Reed	End^{5}	Oregon
Harry Shipkey	Tackle	Stanford
Ray Stephens	Center	Idaho
John Vesser	End	Idaho
Chal Walters	Center	Washington
Abe Wilson	Guard	Washington
Wildcat Wilson	Tailback	Washington

^{1} Position now known as quarterback
^{2} Played wingback, tailback, and blocking back
^{3} Played fullback and blocking back
^{4} Also played end
^{5} Also played tackle
