= Unconditional (The Bravery song) =

2005 single by the Bravery

Single by the Bravery

from the album The Bravery
- B-side: "An Honest Mistake" (live); "Oh Glory"
- Released: August 22, 2005
- Length: 3:19
- Label: Island
- Songwriter: Sam Endicott
- Producer: Sam Endicott

The Bravery singles chronology
"Fearless" (2005)	"Unconditional" (2005)	"Time Won't Let Me Go" (2007)

"Unconditional" is a song by American rock band the Bravery from their self-titled debut album (2005). It was released as a single on August 22, 2005, and charted at number 49 on the UK Singles Chart.

== Track listings ==
- 7-inch (9884838)
1. "Unconditional"
2. "An Honest Mistake" (acoustic)
  - Recorded for Jo Whiley's Live Lounge.
- CD (9885196)
1. "Unconditional"
2. "Unconditional" (Benny Benassi mix)
- Maxi-CD (9885197)
1. "Unconditional"
2. "Oh Glory"
3. "An Honest Mistake" (Superdiscount mix)
4. "Unconditional" (video)

== Release history ==
Region	Date	Format(s)	Label(s)	Ref.
United States	August 22, 2005	Modern rock tracks	Island	
United Kingdom	August 29, 2005	7-inch vinyl; CD	Loog	
