= Abe Wilson =

American football player (1899–1981)

Profile
- Position: Offensive lineman

Personal information
- Born: October 6, 1899
- Died: 1981

Career information
- College: Washington

Career history
- Los Angeles Wildcats (1926); Providence Steam Roller (1927–1929)

Career statistics
- Games played: 33
- Games started: 20
- Stats at Pro Football Reference

Abe Yeoman Wilson (1899 – 1981) was an American football offensive lineman who played in the American Football League (AFL) and in the National Football League (NFL). He played for the AFL's Los Angeles Wildcats (1926) and the NFL's Providence Steam Roller (1927–1929). Abe played college football for the University of Washington Huskies alongside his brother George Wilson. Wilson also coached at Washington in the 1925 season.
