= General Zimmerman =

General Zimmerman may refer to:

- Charles X. Zimmerman (1865–1926), U.S. Army brigadier general
- Don Z. Zimmerman (1903–1983), U.S. Air Force brigadier general
- Matthew A. Zimmerman (born 1941), U.S. Army major general

== See also ==
- Bodo Zimmermann (1886–1963), Nazi German Army lieutenant general
- Carl Heinrich Zimmermann (1864–1949), German Imperial Army major general
