= Bryan Berg =

American professional cardstacker

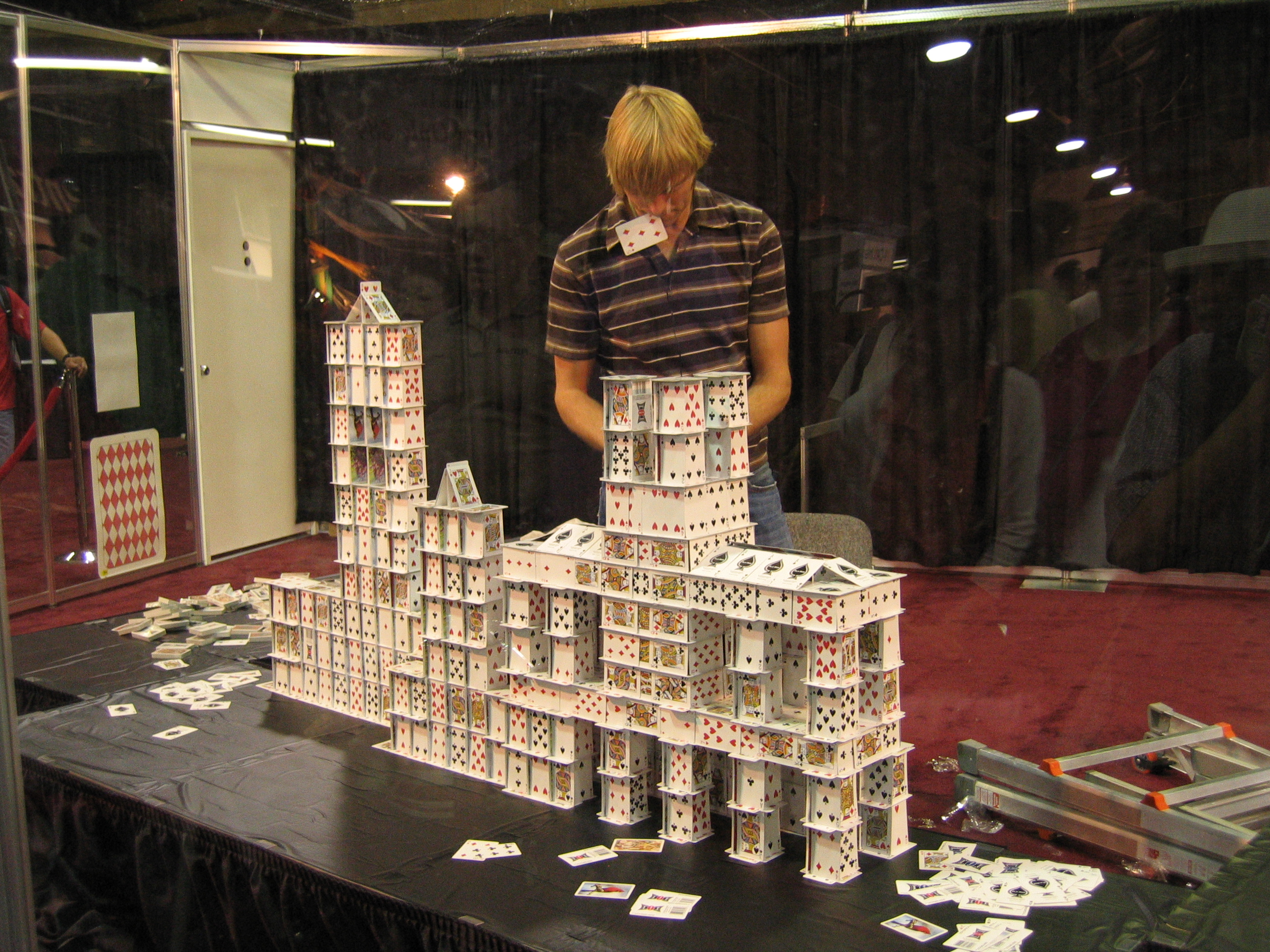
Bryan Berg at work

Bryan Berg (born March 21, 1974) is an American professional cardstacker who builds large-scale houses of cards.

== Career ==
Trained as an architect, Bryan Berg is the only known person to make a living building structure with free-standing playing cards.

Berg earned a bachelor's degree in architecture from Iowa State University in 1997, and served on the design faculty there for three years. In 2004, Berg earned a master's degree in design studies from the Harvard Graduate School of Design.

Berg has stacked cards for corporate special events, public relations campaigns, and science and children's museums in many U.S. cities, Canada, Europe, and Asia. Berg's clients have included Walt Disney World, Lexus, Procter & Gamble, Major League Baseball, the NHL, and the San Francisco Opera. He also participated in a music video by The Bravery, playing a lonely man who builds a fantasy world out of cards.

=== World's tallest house of cards ===
Berg first broke the world record for the world's tallest house of free-standing playing cards in 1992 at the age of seventeen, with a tower fourteen and a half feet (4.4 meters) tall. Since then, Berg has been commissioned to break his own Guinness Record approximately ten times.

He built another tower in the College of Design's atrium at Iowa State University in 1998. It stood at approximately 25 feet (7.6 meters) tall and used over 1500 decks of standard cards weighing over 250 pounds (110 kilograms). It took two and a half weeks to build working in shifts from four to twelve hours each day. During construction, the tower was surrounded by scaffolding. On November 6, 1999, Berg built a taller tower for the German edition of Guinness Prime Time in the lobby of the casino at Potsdamer Platz, Berlin. That tower was approximately 25.29 feet (7.71 meters) tall and required over 1700 decks to stack up to 131 stories.

Berg's most recent record was a 25-foot 9 7/16 inch tall tower built at the African-American Museum at Fair Park in Dallas, Texas. For this record, he tried a new technique involving stacking cards vertically instead of horizontally, which reduced the number of cards needed by nearly half.

On September 18, 2009, on Live with Regis & Kelly, Berg attempted to break the Guinness World Record for tallest free-standing card structure in 60 minutes. As Berg stopped building the structure when time ran out, the cards fell down, costing him his bid for a new world record. 9 years later, on September 13, 2018, Berg made a second attempt on the show at the record and succeeded.

=== World's largest house of cards ===
In 2004, Guinness created a record category for the world's largest house of free-standing playing cards to recognize a project Berg built for Walt Disney World, a replica of Cinderella's Castle. In 2010, Berg exceeded his own record by using over 218,000 cards to construct a replica of the Venetian Macao, which took 44 days.

=== Technique ===
Berg normally uses no tape, glue, or tricks. His method has been tested to support 660 lbs. per square foot.

In 2006, Berg used an adhesive for the first time on one of his projects. The structure, a re-creation of the "Fabulous Las Vegas" sign, was created for Loctite with the adhesive brand's Loctite Control Gel Super Glue. The sign was displayed during the 2006 World Series of Poker in Las Vegas.

== Notability ==
Berg's work has had extensive media coverage. He has appeared on CNN, The Today Show, Good Morning America, and various other United States and international TV shows. His work has been featured in US newspapers and publications such as Wired, Reader's Digest "Best of America" Issue, Men's Health, and Time for Kids. Berg also appeared in the video for "Time Won't Let Me Go" by the Bravery. Berg was featured on the PBS game show, Fetch! with Ruff Ruffman on season 3, where he was given the task to teach the fetchers how to build a house of cards.

In 2003 Berg published a book with Simon & Schuster, Stacking The Deck, as a how-to about some of his techniques and structures.

== Personal life ==
Born in Spirit Lake, Iowa, Berg now lives with his wife in Santa Fe, New Mexico.

== See also ==
- House of cards
- Skyscraper
