= Myles Evans =

Myles or Miles Evans may refer to:

- Myles D. Evans, American football player and coach
- Miles Evans, musician who worked with Lew Soloff
