= Charles Zimmerman =

Charles Zimmerman may refer to:

- Charles H. Zimmerman (1908–1996), American aeronautical engineer
- Charles S. Zimmerman (1896–1983), American socialist politician and trade union official
- Charles X. Zimmerman (1865–1926), military commander, businessman and politician
- Charles B. Zimmerman (1891–1969), lawyer and judge in Ohio
- Charles A. Zimmermann (1861–1916), American composer
- Charlie Zimmerman (American football) (1904–1954), American college athletics coach and administrator
