= Cleveland Panthers =

American football team, 1919–1933

General information
- Founded: 1919
- Folded: 1933
- Stadium: Luna Bowl
- Headquartered: Cleveland, Ohio, United States
- Colors: Brown, Gold, White

Personnel
- Owner: Gen. Charles X. Zimmerman
- Head coach: Ray E. Watts

Team history
- Cleveland Panthers

League / conference affiliations
- American Football League (1926)

The Cleveland Panthers were a professional American football team. They were an independent team founded in 1919 from the remains of the Youngstown Patricians. The Panthers played, with various degrees of success, continuously from 1919 and eventually, as fewer opponents played them each year after 1926, sputtered to a quiet folding in 1933.

== The first American Football League (AFL) ==
The Panthers competed in the first American Football League (AFL), founded by Charles "Cash and Carry" Pyle (1882–1939), in 1926. The Panthers, owned by General Charles X. Zimmerman (1865–1926) (the vice president of the AFL), played their home games in old Luna Bowl in Luna Park. Coached by Ray E. Watts, the team drew its players from Ohio colleges and universities and raided the rosters of early National Football League (NFL) teams based in Ohio

The veteran squad led by tailback Al Michaels was one of only two AFL franchises (the other was the New York Yankees) to average more than 12 points per game. Other former Cleveland Bulldogs Dave Noble and Doc Elliott helped provide offensive firepower, while two-sport star Cookie Cunningham excelled at end, scoring twice on long passes in an October 3, 1926, game against the Los Angeles Wildcats.

In terms of fan support, the Panthers appeared to have had a good start, defeating the Yankees in their first game, at Luna Bowl in front of a reported 22,000 people, but after a second home victory (17-13, against the Wildcats) in which the attendance figures were apparently not reported, and a third straight home win (this time 23–7 against the Rock Island Independents) in front of only 7,000 people, it was becoming evident that the Panthers were in trouble despite being in first place with an undefeated record. A 19–12 defeat in front of only 3,000 spectators in Chicago's baseball Comiskey Park (the stadium of the Chicago White Sox), foreshadowed the inevitable as the similarly troubled Newark Bears withdrew from the league on October 24, 1926.

The next week, the Panthers returned home to old Luna Park for a rematch with the Los Angeles Wildcats, a hard-fought game dominated by defense, with Cleveland guard Al Nesser dictating much of the game until a fourth quarter fumble by Al Michaels led to the only score of the game in a 6-0 Wildcats win. While the game was stellar, the attendance was not: only 1,000 fans saw it. The following week Stearns Advertising Co. sued the team for $1,000, and the court placed it in receivership. The players were stranded on the road in Philadelphia. The team was disfranchised by the league and disbanded.

Year	W	L	T	Finish	Coach
1926	3	2	0	3rd	Ray E. Watts

Four Panthers subsequently found roster spots on AFL and NFL teams to complete the 1926 season, while six who had played in the NFL had their professional football careers end with the demise of the Cleveland Panthers.

The exodus from the AFL continued through November 1926, and after the last official game was played (December 12, 1926), the league itself went out of business.

== Players in the first AFL ==
The following people played for the Panthers for at least one game in the 1926 AFL regular season, the only one of the league's existence:

Name	Position	College
Norty "Mope" Behm	End^{1}	Iowa State
Cookie Cunningham	End	Ohio State
Doc Elliott	Fullback	Lafayette
Myles Evans	Tackle	Ohio Wesleyan
Billy Gribben	Tailback	Case Western Reserve
Eddie "Red" Kregenow	End	Akron
Al Michaels	Tailback	Heidelberg, Ohio State
Al Nesser^{2}	Guard^{3}	none
Dave Noble	Back^{4}	Nebraska
John Otterbacher	Guard	Ohio State
Guy Roberts	Back^{4}	Iowa State
Red Roberts	Tackle	Centre
Jack Sack	Guard	Pittsburgh
Bob Spiers	Tackle^{5}	Ohio State
Al Thornburg	Center	Iowa State
Ralph Vince	Guard	Washington & Jefferson
Leo Virant	Guard	Iowa State
Red Weaver	Center	Centre
Jay Winters	Blocking back^{6}	Ohio Wesleyan
Dick Wolf	Blocking back	Miami (Ohio)

^{1} Also played fullback
^{2} Started 1926 season as coach of Akron Indians, then left to play for Panthers
^{3} Also played tackle
^{4} Played wingback and fullback
^{5} Also played guard
^{6} Position currently known as quarterback

== Aftermath & legacy ==
Immediately after the sudden dissolution of the Panthers, four of the team's members managed to join other rosters in either the NFL or the AFL. Doc Elliot found a spot in the eventual AFL champion Philadelphia Quakers, while Al Nesser returned to the NFL, this time playing for the New York Giants. Guy Roberts and Jack Sack both found a new "home" with the Canton Bulldogs. While Sack finished his career in 1926 and Elliott was out of professional football until 1931, the other two former members continued their careers after the end of the first AFL.

They were not the only 1926 Panthers to go on to play for the NFL afterwards:

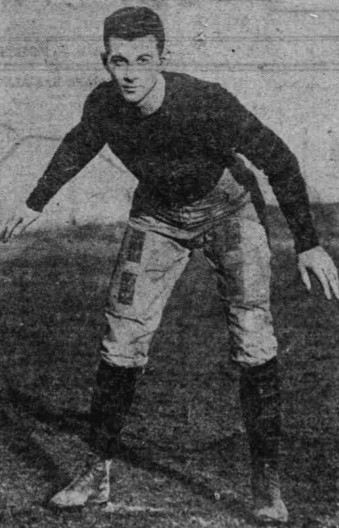
Jack Sack

Cookie Cunningham – 1927 Cleveland Bulldogs, 1929 Chicago Bears, 1931 Staten Island Stapletons
Doc Elliott – 1931 Cleveland Indians
Al Nesser – 1926-28 New York Giants, 1931 Cleveland Indians
Guy Roberts – 1926 Canton Bulldogs, 1927 Pottsville Maroons
Jack Sack – 1926 Canton Bulldogs
Dick Wolf – 1927 Cleveland Bulldogs

Cunningham also played in the American Basketball League 1926-1931 and was a player-coach in the National Basketball League in 1937 and 1938.

On the other hand, six former NFL players had their professional football careers end with the folding of the Panthers:

Al Michaels – 1923-24 Akron Pros, 1925 Cleveland Bulldogs
Dave Noble – 1924-25 Cleveland Bulldogs, 1926 Cleveland Panthers
Red Roberts – 1922 Toledo Maroons, 1923 Akron Pros
Bob Spiers – 1922 Akron Pros, 1925 Cleveland Bulldogs
Ralph Vince – 1923 and 1925 Cleveland Bulldogs
Red Weaver – 1923-25 Columbus Tigers (coach 1924–25)

The Panthers returned in 1927 but as an independent semi-professional team managed by George T. Jones, who been the secretary for the team under owner Zimmerman (who died in 1926). The team folded in 1933.

After Cleveland received a franchise to play in the All-America Football Conference (AAFC) in 1944, the team's head coach, Paul Brown (1908-1991), was reluctant to use his own name, while the Panthers name still had popular support in a newspaper contest.

However, Jones still held the rights to the "Panthers" name, and he demanded several thousand dollars from team owner Arthur B. McBride for the use of the name. However, after Brown told McBride "That old Panthers team failed, I want no part of that name", McBride refused to pay. He reopened the contest, and selected the Browns name for his team; Brown ultimately acquiesced, and so the team would be named the Cleveland Browns. The Browns joined the National Football League (NFL) from the AAFC in 1950, and continue to play in the NFL today.

The Panthers nickname would be revived in the NFL in 1993, when an expansion team was awarded to Charlotte, North Carolina: the Carolina Panthers.
