= The Bravery (album) =

2005 studio album by the Bravery

Studio album by the Bravery
- Released: March 14, 2005
- Studio: Bushwick (Brooklyn, New York City); Various bedrooms
- Genre: Indie rock; post-punk revival; dance-punk; dance-rock
- Length: 37:51
- Label: Island
- Producer: Sam Endicott

The Bravery chronology
The Bravery (2005)	The Sun and the Moon (2007)

Singles from The Bravery
- 1. "An Honest Mistake" Released: January 31, 2005; 2. "Fearless" Released: May 23, 2005; 3. "Unconditional" Released: August 22, 2005

The Bravery is the debut studio album by American rock band the Bravery, released on March 14, 2005, by Island Records. It peaked at number 18 on the US Billboard 200 and number 5 on the UK Albums Chart.

The first single from the album, "An Honest Mistake", was released on January 31, 2005. The UK and Japanese releases of the album contain the bonus track "Hot Pursuit". The version on the Japanese edition is a different mix, featuring Gillian Conway (keyboardist John Conway's sister) on vocals, along with Sam Endicott.

The track "Swollen Summer" is featured in the PlayStation 2 game, Gran Turismo 4. The Bravery opened up their set with this song at the July 27, 2008 Projekt Revolution concert held in the Nissan Pavilion in Bristow, Virginia. The song "Unconditional" is featured in the 2005 game, Tony Hawk's American Wasteland. The song "An Honest Mistake" is featured in the video games True Crime: New York City and MVP Baseball 2005 (a remixed version by DJ Superdiscount can be found on Burnout Revenge).

== Critical reception ==
Professional ratings
Aggregate scores
Source	Rating
Metacritic	66/100
Review scores
Source	Rating
AllMusic	3.5/5 stars
Lost at Sea	8/10
NME	7/10
Pitchfork	5.3/10
PopMatters	7/10
Robert Christgau	(dud)
Rolling Stone	3/5 stars
Stylus Magazine	D+
Uncut	5/5 stars

The Bravery garnered positive reviews from music critics who praised their interpretation of the new wave revival movement. At Metacritic, which assigns a normalized rating out of 100 to reviews from mainstream critics, the album received an average score of 66, based on 24 reviews.

Steve Sutherland of Uncut gave high praise to the new wave revivalist production and the band's musicianship resembling that of their inspirations, in terms of vocals and instrumentals, concluding that, "This album is already one of the debuts of the year. All hail The Bravery and their new bold dream." MacKenzie Wilson of AllMusic praised the band for taking their influences and making them their own with catchability and upbeat optimism, saying that, "The Bravery isn't sonically mind-blowing, but the new millennium new wave revival remains intriguing. This New York five-piece makes an interesting effort without it coming off contrived and dishonest."

While finding Endicott's vocal delivery mediocre at best, Nicholas Taylor of PopMatters praised the danceable production and devil-may-care lyrics for giving the band a nice platform to start from, concluding with, "This debut is certainly promising, and I look forward to seeing whether the Bravery can begin to carve out a more concrete and distinctive image and place for themselves." Robert Christgau graded the album as a "dud", indicating "a bad record whose details rarely merit further thought." Pitchfork writer Adam Moerder criticized the band's unremarkable take on '80s new wave with lacklustre instrumentals and Endicott's vocals sounding too close to Robert Smith and Simon Le Bon. He gave praise to the tracks "An Honest Mistake" and "Tyrant" for their intricacies in terms of synth and vocal choices, concluding that "Despite these highlights, though, this is still rock made on an assembly line— predictable, economically efficient, and about as dynamic as a Model T."

== Track listing ==
All tracks are written by Sam Endicott, except where noted.

No.	Title	Length
1.	"An Honest Mistake"	3:39
2.	"No Brakes"	3:04
3.	"Fearless"	3:06
4.	"Tyrant" (Endicott, John Conway)	4:43
5.	"Give In"	2:48
6.	"Swollen Summer"	3:18
7.	"Public Service Announcement"	3:35
8.	"Out of Line"	3:04
9.	"Unconditional"	3:21
10.	"The Ring Song"	3:25
11.	"Rites of Spring"	3:21
Total length:		37:51

=== Bonus tracks ===
12. "Hot Pursuit" (Endicott, Conway) – 3:07 (UK/Japanese bonus track)
13. "Hey Sunshiney Day" (Endicott, Conway) – 2:26 (Japanese bonus track)
14. "Unconditional" (video) (Japanese bonus track)
15. "An Honest Mistake" (video) (Japanese bonus track)

== Personnel ==
Credits adapted from the album's liner notes.

The Bravery

- Sam Endicott – lead vocals, rhythm guitar
- Michael Zakarin – lead guitar, backing vocals
- John Conway – keyboards, backing vocals
- Mike Hindert – bass, backing vocals
- Anthony Burulcich – drums, backing vocals

Additional musicians

- Steven Lourie – drums on tracks 1–4 and 6–8
- Joshua Kessler – tambourine on track 10

Technical

- Nic Hard – mixing
- Brian Gardner – mastering

Artwork

- Louis Marino – art direction

== Charts ==
=== Weekly charts ===
Weekly chart performance for The Bravery
Chart (2005)	Peak position
Australian Albums (ARIA)	69
Canadian Albums (Nielsen SoundScan)	72
French Albums (SNEP)	92
Irish Albums (IRMA)	15
Scottish Albums (OCC)	3
UK Albums (OCC)	5
US Billboard 200	18

=== Year-end charts ===
Year-end chart performance for The Bravery
Chart (2005)	Position
UK Albums (OCC)	147

== Certifications ==
Certifications for The Bravery
Region	Certification	Certified units/sales
United Kingdom (BPI)	Gold	100,000^{^}
^{^} Shipments figures based on certification alone.
