= Jack Sack =

American football player and coach (1902–1980)

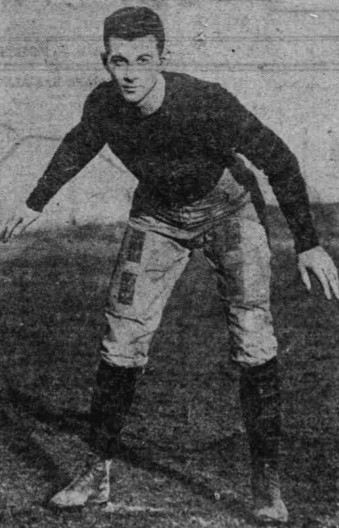

No. 10 (Columbus), 9 (Canton)
- Positions: Guard, tackle

Personal information
- Born: February 22, 1902; Pittsburgh, Pennsylvania, U.S.
- Died: March 7, 1980 (aged 78)
- Listed height: 6 ft 2 in (1.88 m)
- Listed weight: 190 lb (86 kg)

Career information
- High school: Fifth Avenue (Pittsburgh)
- College: Pittsburgh

Career history

Playing
- Columbus Tigers (1923); Canton Bulldogs (1926); Cleveland Panthers (1926)

Coaching
- Geneva (1924)

Jack Sack (February 22, 1902 – March 7, 1980; born Jacob Bernard Sacklowsky) was an American football player and coach. Sack was a college football player at the University of Pittsburgh and coach, and played professional football in both the National Football League (NFL) and the American Football League (AFL).

== Early life ==
Sack was born in Pittsburgh, Pennsylvania, was of Russian-Polish extraction, and was Jewish. He attended Fifth Avenue High School in Pittsburgh.

== College career ==
After playing in high school in Pittsburgh, Sack attended the University of Pittsburgh where he played for the 1920 until 1922. Sack was named Walter Camp All-America honorable mention and New York Times All-East honorable mention. He was selected by Dr. L. H. Baker as a member of Pittsburgh's All-Time Team.

== Professional football career ==
=== Columbus Tigers ===
Sack made his professional debut in the NFL in 1923 with the Columbus Tigers. He played for the Tigers for one year.

=== Canton Bulldogs ===
In 1926, Sack signed on with the Canton Bulldogs of the NFL, where he played under future Hall of Fame coach Pete Henry.

=== Cleveland Panthers ===
Sack also played in the American Football League with the Cleveland Panthers. While playing for the Panthers, he was also signed on with the Canton Bulldogs.

== Coaching career ==
Sack was the 12th head football coach at Geneva College in Beaver Falls, Pennsylvania, serving for one season, in 1924, and compiling a record of 3–4–2.

== Later life ==
Sack eventually became the owner of Pittsburgh Office Furniture and Equipment in Pittsburgh. He died on March 7, 1980, following a long illness.

== Honors ==
Sack was inducted into the Jewish Sports Hall of Fame of Western Pennsylvania in 1992.

== Head coaching record ==
| Year | Team | Overall | Conference | Standing | Bowl/playoffs |
|---|---|---|---|---|---|
Geneva Covenanters (Tri-State Conference) (1924)
| 1924 | Geneva | 3–4–2 | 2–0–1 | T–1st | |
| Geneva: | | 3–4–2 | 2–0–1 | | |
| Total: | | 3–4–2 | | | |
National championship Conference title Conference division title or championship game berth
