= Slow Poison =

Single by The Bravery

from the album Stir the Blood
- Released: September 13, 2009
- Genre: Indie rock
- Length: 3:32
- Label: Island Records
- Songwriter(s): Sam Endicott
- Producer(s): John Hill, Sam Endicott

The Bravery singles chronology
"This is Not the End" (2008)	"Slow Poison" (2009)	"I Am Your Skin" (2009)

"Slow Poison" is a 2009 song by the American indie rock band The Bravery. It was the first single from their album Stir the Blood. It peaked at #23 on the Billboard Hot Modern Rock Tracks chart and at #40 on the Rock Songs chart.
