= Cap Edwards =

American football player and coach (1888–1944)

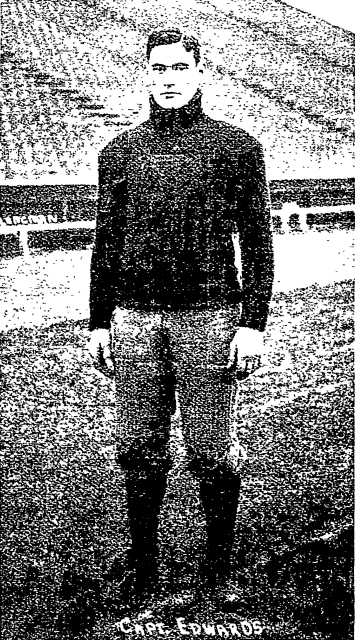
- Edwards at Notre Dame, 1909

No. 7, 12, 22
- Position: Guard

Personal information
- Born: September 5, 1888; St. Joseph, Missouri, U.S.
- Died: November 23, 1944 (aged 56); South Bend, Indiana, U.S.
- Listed height: 6 ft 0 in (1.83 m)
- Listed weight: 207 lb (94 kg)

Career information
- High school: South Bend (IN) Central
- College: Notre Dame

Career history

Playing
- Canton Bulldogs (1920–1921); Toledo Maroons (1922); Cleveland Indians (1923); Cleveland Bulldogs (1924)

Coaching
- Canton Bulldogs (1921); Cleveland Indians (1923); Cleveland Bulldogs (1925)

Awards and highlights
- NFL champion (1924)
- Coaching profile at Pro Football Reference
- Stats at Pro Football Reference

William Howard "Cap" Edwards (September 5, 1888 – November 23, 1944) was a National Football League (NFL) coach and player in American football's earliest years. In the early 20th century, football in America was just beginning to catch on, with professional teams popping up in numerous cities, and at the time college football was more popular.

Edwards attended and graduated from the University of Notre Dame, where he played football as a guard. His professional coaching career was short-lived, but nonetheless noteworthy as he coached in the pioneering days of football with such greats as Jim Thorpe and Guy Chamberlin. He first coached the Canton Bulldogs in 1921, which ended in a 5–2–3 record. In 1923 Edwards coached the Cleveland Indians, with a 3–1–3 record, followed by a 5–8–1 record as coach of the Cleveland Bulldogs.

Edwards also served as the head football coach at West Virginia Wesleyan College in Buckhannon, West Virginia from 1910 to 1911.

== Head coaching record ==
=== College ===
Year	Team	Overall	Conference	Standing	Bowl/playoffs
West Virginia Wesleyan Bobcats (Independent) (1910–1911)
1910	West Virginia Wesleyan	4–3–1			
1911	West Virginia Wesleyan	1–4–1			
West Virginia Wesleyan:		5–4–2			
Total:		5–4–2			
