= Dick Wolf (American football) =

American football player (1900–1967)

Profile
- Positions: End, halfback, fullback, quarterback

Personal information
- Born: August 29, 1900; Greenville, Ohio, U.S.
- Died: June 28, 1967 (aged 66); Marion, Indiana, U.S.

Career information
- College: Miami (OH)

Career history
- 1923: Cleveland Indians
- 1924–1925: Cleveland Bulldogs
- 1926: Cleveland Panthers
- 1927: Cleveland Bulldogs
- 1928–1929: Ashland Armco

Richard Delmont Wolf (August 29, 1900 – June 28, 1967) was an American professional football player in the early National Football League (NFL). He first played at the college level for Miami University. Wolf then played in the NFL with the Cleveland Indians and the Cleveland Bulldogs. He also played in the 1926 American Football League (AFL) for the Cleveland Panthers. Wolf then finished his career in the semi-pro circuit with the independent Ashland Armcos in 1928–1929.
