= Fearless (The Bravery song) =

2005 single by the Bravery

Single by the Bravery

from the album the Bravery
- B-side: "It's All I Can Do"; "An Cat Dubh"
- Released: May 23, 2005
- Length: 3:06
- Label: Polydor
- Songwriter: Sam Endicott
- Producer: Sam Endicott

The Bravery singles chronology
| "An Honest Mistake" (2005) | "Fearless" (2005) | "Unconditional" (2005) |

"Fearless" is the second single from American indie rock the Bravery's eponymous debut album (2005). It was released in the United Kingdom on May 23, 2005, and charted at number 43 on the UK Singles Chart. The B-side is a cover of the U2 song "An Cat Dubh". The music video shows the band playing on speedboats of a shipping container terminal harbor.

== Track listings ==
- 7-inch 9882340
1. "Fearless"
2. "It's All I Can Do"
- CD 9882338
1. "Fearless"
2. "An Cat Dubh"
- DVD 9882504
1. "Fearless" (video)
2. "No Brakes" (live at London Koko video)
3. Image gallery

== Appearances in pop culture ==
"Fearless" was featured in "Weeping Willow", a sixth season episode of the television series Law & Order: Criminal Intent.
