= Guy Roberts (American football, born 1900) =

American football player (1900–1993)

Profile
- Positions: Fullback, halfback, quarterback

Personal information
- Born: May 10, 1900; Schaller, Iowa, U.S.
- Died: June 8, 1993 (aged 93); Los Altos, California, U.S.

Career information
- College: Iowa State

Career history
- 1926: Canton Bulldogs
- 1926: Cleveland Bulldogs
- 1927: Pottsville Maroons

Guy Thomas "Zeke" Roberts (May 10, 1900 – June 8, 1993) was an American professional football player in the early National Football League (NFL) and the first American Football League (AFL). He played for three pro teams over the course of two years. In 1926 he played with the Canton Bulldogs in the NFL and the Cleveland Panthers in the AFL. He played the following season with the NFL's Pottsville Maroons. Prior to his professional career, Roberts played college football for the Iowa State Cyclones.

== College football ==
Roberts played college football at Iowa State. He played alongside Jack Trice, who became the first African-American athlete at the school. He was also on the field during an October 6, 1923 game between Iowa State and University of Minnesota. It was during that game that Trice received several injuries that led to his death two days later.

Roberts also played in a one professional game, under an alias, while still a student at Iowa State. Following the end of the Cyclones 1924 season, he and two other players were asked to play a post-season game for which they would be paid. During the game, the Iowa State players realized that some of their opponents were from the University of Iowa. Roberts later stated that he still had one year of eligibility on the men's basketball team and was fearful of being caught.

Roberts played four years at Iowa State, but did not graduate.

== Professional football ==
In the summer of 1926, Guy was living in Los Angeles. It was then that he received word from the NFL's Pottsville Maroons regarding him playing with the club that upcoming season. Roberts drove from California to Pottsville, Pennsylvania, on a stripped down Model T Ford. While en route to Pottsville he stopped in Cleveland to see his future wife. While in Cleveland, he met with the manager of the Cleveland Panthers, who were a part of the upstart American Football League. The offered Guy $150 to play for them, which was more that what the Maroons were offering, and he accepted.

However, the league folded after only a few games, and Guy returned to California. As soon as he got back to Los Angeles, the NFL's Canton Bulldogs called Guy with an offer and he soon joined the team and played the remainder of the 1926 with the Bulldogs, alongside Jim Thorpe and Pete "Fats" Henry.

In September 1927, Guy was on Ohio to prepare for his October 1 wedding. It was then that he again received word from Pottsville Marrons asking him to play for the club for the upcoming season. Roberts accepted and he played for the Pottsville Maroons for the 1927 season.
