= Cookie Cunningham =

American football player (1905–1995)

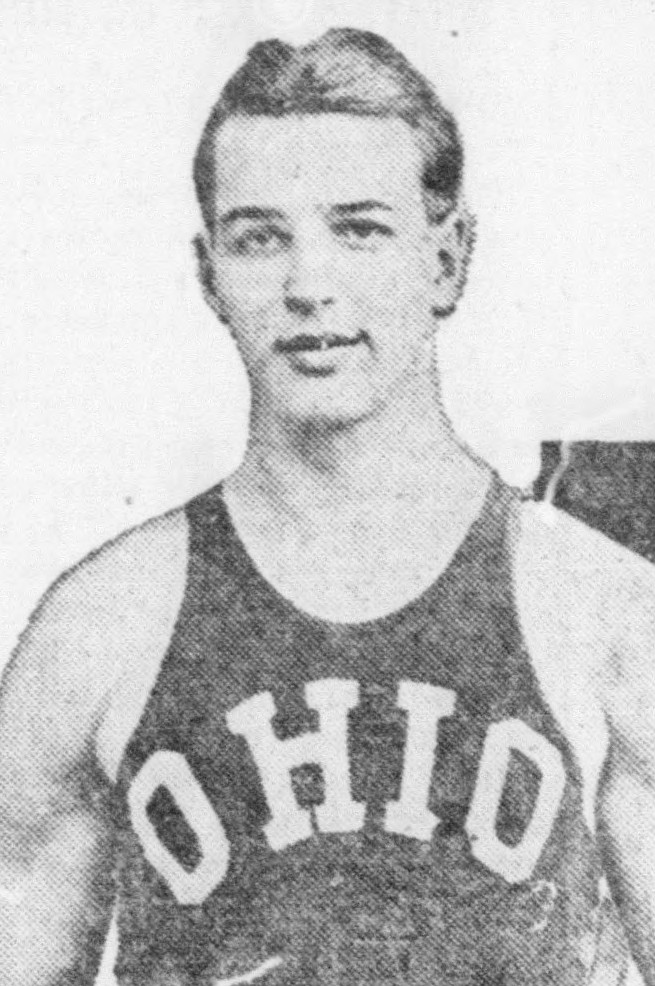
- Cunningham, circa 1924

No. 14
- Position: End

Personal information
- Born: March 4, 1905; Mount Vernon, Ohio, U.S.
- Died: November 3, 1995 (aged 90); Leesburg, Florida, U.S.
- Listed height: 6 ft 3 in (1.91 m)
- Listed weight: 210 lb (95 kg)

Career information
- High school: Mount Vernon (OH)
- College: Ohio State

Career history
- Cleveland Panthers (1926); Cleveland Bulldogs (1927); Chicago Bears (1929); Staten Island Stapletons (1931)

Awards and highlights
- First-team All-Big Ten (1924); Second-team All-Big Ten (1925)
- Stats at Pro Football Reference

Harold Brewer "Cookie" Cunningham (February 4, 1905 – November 3, 1995) was an American professional football player, basketball player, and basketball coach.

A two-sport athlete at Ohio State University, he started playing both football and basketball on the professional level in 1926. He started his professional football career by playing end for the Cleveland Panthers of the first American Football League. After the folding of the AFL, he played the same position for the Cleveland Bulldogs (1927), Chicago Bears (1929), and the Staten Island Stapletons (1931) of the National Football League. In the same five-year span, Cunningham also played center for the Cleveland Rosenblums and the Toledo Red Man Tobaccos (American Basketball League).

== Coaching career ==
Subsequently, he became a basketball coach, first on the collegiate level before becoming a player-coach in the National Basketball League (Columbus Athletic Supply in 1937–38). He subsequently returned to the college ranks, coaching for Washington and Lee University (1939–1942) and the University of North Dakota (1946–1948).
