= Ralph Vince =

American judge

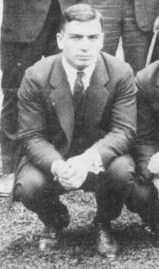
- Vince prior to the 1922 Rose Bowl

Profile
- Positions: Guard, tackle

Personal information
- Born: March 18, 1900; Vinci, Tuscany, Italy
- Died: October 29, 1996 (aged 96); Shaker Heights, Ohio, U.S.
- Listed height: 5 ft 8 in (1.73 m)
- Listed weight: 175 lb (79 kg)

Career information
- College: Washington & Jefferson; Western Reserve (JD)

Career history

Playing
- Washington & Jefferson (1920–1922); Cleveland Indians (1923); Cleveland Bulldogs (1924–1925); Cleveland Panthers (1926)

Coaching
- John Carroll (1927–1932) (head coach)

Head coaching record
- Career: 31–23–11 (.562)
- Stats at Pro Football Reference

Raffaello D. "Ralph" Vince (March 18, 1900 – October 29, 1996) was an American football player for the Cleveland Indians, Cleveland Bulldogs, and the Cleveland Panthers. He later coached at Baldwin–Wallace College and John Carroll University. Outspoken and inventive as a coach, he was the inventor of the face mask. The original he created is on display at the Pro Football Hall of Fame in Canton, Ohio. He was the first coach to put an armband of plays on his quarterbacks' wrists, now a common sight in football. He attended Washington & Jefferson College and played in the 1922 Rose Bowl. He is distinguished as being the first Italian to play in the National Football League (NFL).

== Early life and playing career ==
Vince was an Italian immigrant who grew up working in the coal mines of southern Ohio. He watched his first football game as a senior at Martins Ferry High School. Realizing that a football scholarship was his ticket out of the coal mines and into college, he joined the varsity team. Ralph succeeded, and the next year, attended and played for Washington & Jefferson College in Washington, Pennsylvania.

He played both offense and defense for the Presidents. In 1922, the team played the favored University of California to a scoreless tie in the Rose Bowl. On the 60th and 70th anniversaries of that game, Vince was an honored guest at the Rose Bowl.

After graduating from Washington & Jefferson in 1922, Vince enrolled at Western Reserve University's Law School in Cleveland. In order to pay his way through law school, Vince played in the early National Football League (NFL) for the Cleveland Indians in 1923 and Cleveland Bulldogs in 1924 and 1925. Vince also played for the Cleveland Panthers in 1926, in the first American Football League (AFL). During this era of professional football, Vince was on the field against such names as Jim Thorpe, George Halas, Red Grange, and Fats Henry.

== Coaching career ==
While in law school in Cleveland, Vince coached football for St. Ignatius High School beginning in 1923, coaching to the team to its first city championship in 1925. His football record from 1923 through 1926 was a combined 29–6 (.829), Ralph also coached St. Ignatius basketball team for the 1924–25 season.

With his success at the high school level, John Carroll University recruited him to be their head football coach. Coaching seven seasons from 1927 through 1933, Vince achieved a collegiate coaching record of 31–23–11 (.562). Vince later served as the school's athletic director for two years.

In 1935, Vince left John Carroll to practice law; however, he continued officiating at high school, college and NFL games.

During World War II, he agreed to coach football at University School for one year; however, he stayed on with the school for an additional 12 years.

== Legal career and later years ==
Vince was appointed as a Cleveland Municipal judge after leaving John Carroll. He also served for two years as a councilman and four years as a law director in University Heights.

In the early 1950s, he presided over the lawsuits regarding the SS Noronic disaster. The SS Noronic was a passenger ship that was destroyed by fire in Toronto Harbour in September 1949 with serious loss of life. Vince heard 669 lawsuits filed by those who were injured or lost their relatives in the tragedy.

Ralph retired as a senior partner of the Burke Haber Berick law firm in 1990. He also helped found the Cleveland Touchdown Club. In 1991, the Ralph Vince Fitness Center was dedicated at John Carroll University. In 1986, he was inducted in the Cleveland Sports Hall of Fame.

== Head coaching record ==
=== College football ===
Year	Team	Overall	Conference	Standing	Bowl/playoffs
John Carroll Blue Streaks (Independent) (1927–1931)
1927	John Carroll	3–2–3			
1928	John Carroll	6–3			
1929	John Carroll	5–3–1			
1930	John Carroll	3–5–2			
1931	John Carroll	4–4–2			
John Carroll Blue Streaks (Ohio Athletic Conference) (1932–1933)
1932	John Carroll	5–4–1	3–2–1	T–9th	
1933	John Carroll	5–2–2	3–2–2	T–7th	
John Carroll:		31–23–11			
Total:		31–23–11			
