= Al Michaels (running back) =

American football player (1900–1972)

Profile
- Position: Fullback/Halfback

Personal information
- Born: April 1, 1900; Tiffin, Ohio
- Died: October 21, 1972 (aged 72); Gadsden, Alabama

Career information
- College: Heidelberg College; Ohio State University

Career history
- Akron Pros (1923–1924); Cleveland Bulldogs (1925); Cleveland Panthers (1926)

Career statistics
- Rushing yards: N/A
- Rushing average: N/A
- Rushing TDs: 1

Alton Court (Bud) Michaels (April 1, 1900 – October 21, 1972) was an American football running back.

After attending Ohio State University, he joined the Akron Pros of the National Football League, and played a total of 14 games for the team in the 1923 and 1924 seasons, earning first-team All-Pro honors in 1923. In 1925, he played for the Cleveland Bulldogs, appearing in all 14 of the team's contests. The following year, Michaels joined the Cleveland Panthers of the new American Football League and appeared in all five games the team played before folding.
