= Doc Elliott =

American football player (1900–1976)

No. 21, 4, 8
- Positions: Fullback, halfback

Personal information
- Born: April 6, 1900; Youngstown, Ohio, U.S.
- Died: January 11, 1976 (aged 75); Fort Myers, Florida, U.S.
- Listed height: 5 ft 10 in (1.78 m)
- Listed weight: 209 lb (95 kg)

Career information
- High school: The Kiski School
- College: Lafayette

Career history
- Canton Bulldogs (1922–1923); Cleveland Bulldogs (1924–1925); Cleveland Panthers (1926); Philadelphia Quakers (1926); Cleveland Indians (1931)

Awards and highlights
- 3× NFL champion ('22,'23,'24); AFL champion ('26); 2× Canton Daily News: 1st team all-NFL ('22,'23); 2× GB Press-Gazette: 1st team all-NFL ('23,'24)
- Stats at Pro Football Reference

Wallace John "Doc" Elliott (April 6, 1900 – January 11, 1976) was an American professional football running back. He played five seasons in the National Football League (NFL) for the Canton Bulldogs, Cleveland Bulldogs and the Cleveland Indians. During that time he won NFL Championships with Canton in 1922 and 1923, as well as a third with the Cleveland Bulldogs in 1924.

Doc Elliott (at left) plunges the line against the New York Football Giants, Nov. 1, 1925.

In 1926, the first American Football League was established. Elliott joined the AFL's Cleveland Panthers that year, however later in the season he signed with Philadelphia Quakers. For their one and only season in existence the Quakers won the AFL championship, before folding along with the league. After that season, Elliott retired from pro football, until 1931 when he played one season with the Cleveland Panthers.

Elliott was described by the Green Bay Press-Gazette in 1924, after obtaining the newspaper's 1st team all-NFL honors as being “a first rate line plunger and wonder on the defense. Elliott was the equal of any when it came to backing up the line.”

== Sources ==
- "Doc" Elliott Is Signed By Quaker Grid Team," Philadelphia Record, November 23, 1926.
- Pro Football Researchers Association Research, "Ditto 1923," The Coffin Corner.
- John Hogrogian, "1924 All-Pros," The Coffin Corner, vol. 6, no. 4 (1984).
- Ongoing Research Project: Jersey Numbers
- "Cleveland Panthers," Encyclopedia of Cleveland History.
