= Al Nesser =

American football player (1893–1967)

No. 9, 2, 10, 17, 7, 40, 46
- Positions: Guard, end

Personal information
- Born: June 6, 1893; Columbus, Ohio, U.S.
- Died: March 11, 1967 (aged 73); Akron, Ohio, U.S.
- Listed height: 6 ft 2 in (1.88 m)
- Listed weight: 195 lb (88 kg)

Career information
- College: None

Career history

Playing
- Columbus Panhandles (1910–1919); Canton Professionals (1914); Akron Pros (1920–1925); Columbus Panhandles (1921); Cleveland Bulldogs (1925); Akron Indians (1926); Cleveland Panthers (1926); New York Giants (1926–1928); Cleveland Indians (1931)

Coaching
- Akron Indians (1926)

Awards and highlights
- 2× NFL champion (1920, 1927); First-team All-Pro (1921); Second-team All-Pro (1922); Helms Athletic Foundation Hall of Fame

Career NFL statistics
- Games played: 93
- Games started: 75
- Touchdowns scored: 4
- Stats at Pro Football Reference

Head coaching record
- Career: 0–1–1 (.250)
- Coaching profile at Pro Football Reference

Alfred Louis Nesser (June 6, 1893 – March 11, 1967) was a professional American football guard and end. He played for seven teams: Akron Pros, Cleveland Bulldogs, Columbus Panhandles, Akron Indians, New York Giants, and Cleveland Indians in the National Football League (NFL) and the Cleveland Panthers in the first American Football League. He won NFL Championship titles with the Akron Pros in 1920 and the New York Giants in 1927. During his career, Nesser played against Charlie Copley, Fritz Pollard and Jim Thorpe.

Although he didn't play college football, prior to the formation of the NFL, Nesser played in the "Ohio League" for the Columbus Panhandles and the Canton Professionals (later renamed the Canton Bulldogs). He was one of the seven Nesser Brothers who played professional football. He became the last Nesser brother to retire from the game, when he ended his playing career in 1931. He was the last football player to play without having to use a mandatory helmet.

He died on March 11, 1967, in Akron, Ohio.

Although none of the Nessers have been named to the Pro Football Hall of Fame, Al was elected to the professional branch of the Helms Foundation Hall of Fame in 1952. In 2004, he was named to the Professional Football Researchers Association Hall of Very Good in the association's second HOVG class.
