= Dave Noble =

American football player (1900–1983)

Profile
- Position: Fullback/Halfback

Personal information
- Born: July 29, 1900; Omaha, Nebraska, U.S.
- Died: January 24, 1983 (aged 82)

Career information
- College: Wisconsin, Nebraska

Career history
- Cleveland Bulldogs (1924–1925); Cleveland Panthers (1926)

Awards and highlights
- NFL champion (1924); First-team All-Pro (1925)

Career statistics
- Rushing touchdowns: 11

David Gordon Noble (July 29, 1900 – January 24, 1983), nicknamed "Big Moose", was an American football running back. He played college football for the University of Nebraska, where he scored the first touchdown in Memorial Stadium history. After his college years, Noble played three seasons in the National Football League (NFL) and one in the American Football League (AFL), and was voted to the NFL All-Pro team in 1925.

== Career ==
=== College ===
Born in Omaha, Nebraska, Noble attended the University of Wisconsin, but he spent most of his college career with the University of Nebraska. Playing for the Cornhuskers from 1921–1923, he helped the team win three consecutive Missouri Valley Conference (MVC) championships. Two of Noble's most notable college performances came in 1923. On October 13, the Cornhuskers opened Memorial Stadium with a game against the University of Oklahoma Sooners. In the second half, Noble scored the first touchdown in the new stadium, the first of two touchdowns by him in a 24–0 Nebraska win. Later in the season, Noble scored two touchdowns in a 14–7 Cornhuskers victory over Knute Rockne's University of Notre Dame team. Noble ran 24 yards for a touchdown in the first half, and caught a 20-yard touchdown pass in the fourth quarter. It was the Fighting Irish's only loss of the 1923 season. Noble was named to the 1923 All-MVC team. He was also a member of Nebraska's track team, running in sprints.

=== Professional ===
After turning pro, Noble signed with the NFL's Cleveland Bulldogs for 1924. On October 12, he scored his first NFL touchdown in a Bulldogs win against the Akron Pros. Playing in all nine of the team's games, and starting in eight, he totalled four rushing and two receiving touchdowns, helping the 7–1–1 Bulldogs win the NFL championship. For his performance, Noble was named to the All-NFL second-team after the season. In 1925, Noble earned NFL All-Pro honors after recording three rushing and three receiving touchdowns during the season; he started all but one game in Cleveland's 5–8–1 season.

The following year, Noble stayed in Cleveland but changed teams, playing for the Cleveland Panthers of the new AFL. In five games, Noble helped the Panthers finish with a final record of 3–2 and was tied for second in the league in rushing touchdowns with four, despite his team's limited schedule. He also caught one touchdown pass. It would prove to be Noble's final professional season.

=== Post-retirement ===
Following his playing career, Noble became an official and worked for the Big Ten Conference. In later years, he became an executive for an insurance company. In 1972, Noble was inducted into the Nebraska Football Hall of Fame. He suffered a stroke on January 24, 1983, and died at the age of 82.
