= Walden Erickson =

American football player (1902–1968)

No. 21
- Position: Tackle

Personal information
- Born: September 3, 1902; Seattle, Washington, U.S.
- Died: December 27, 1968 (aged 66); Chicago, Illinois, U.S.
- Listed height: 6 ft 1 in (1.85 m)
- Listed weight: 205 lb (93 kg)

Career information
- College: Washington

Career history
- Los Angeles Wildcats (1926); Pottsville Maroons (1927)

Awards and highlights
- Third-team All-American (1925); First-team All-PCC (1925)

Career NFL statistics
- Games played: 12
- Stats at Pro Football Reference

Walden D. Erickson (September 3, 1902 – December 27, 1968) was an American professional football player who played in the early National Football League (NFL) as well as in Red Grange's American Football League (AFL). He played only two seasons of professional football.

Erickson played college football for the Washington Huskies, earning third-team All-American honors in 1925. After college, he made his professional debut in the AFL with the Los Angeles Wildcats. When the AFL folded at the end of the season, Erickson took his act to the NFL, playing for the Pottsville Maroons.
