= Time Won't Let Me Go =

Single by The Bravery

from the album The Sun and the Moon
- Released: (United States) March 27, 2007 (United Kingdom) July 9, 2007
- Genre: Indie rock
- Length: 4:11
- Label: (United States) Island; (United Kingdom) Polydor
- Songwriter: Sam Endicott
- Producer: Brendan O'Brien

The Bravery singles chronology
"Unconditional" (2005)	"Time Won't Let Me Go" (2007)	"Believe" (2007)

Alternative cover

"Time Won't Let Me Go" is a song by American alternative rock band The Bravery and is featured on their second album The Sun and the Moon. The song was also released as the first single from that album on March 27, 2007, in the United States (see 2007 in music). In the United Kingdom, the song was released as a single on July 9, 2007.

The second verse contains references to Bryan Adams' hit "Summer of '69" and Cherry Valance, a character from S. E. Hinton's novel The Outsiders. The song is used on the pilot episode of Gossip Girl, the fifth season Las Vegas episode "Run, Cooper Run", the soundtrack of the movie Never Back Down, the Leverage episode "The Snow Job" & in an episode of the fifth season of One Tree Hill.

== Music video ==
The video was directed by Brian Palmer and Brad Palmer of the production company Surround. The video concept is based on a loner kid who spaces out in a cafe and builds a house of cards which he escapes into. It features Guinness World Record Holder Bryan Berg, who holds the record for highest house of cards. The video debuted on AOL music, and was successful on VH1's Top 20 Video Countdown, reaching as high as #2.

== Official Remixes ==
- Tall Paul Remix
- Tall Paul Remix Edit
- Tall Paul Dub
- Ultradonkey Remix
- Ultradonkey Remix Edit
- Van She Tech Remix
- Van She Tech Dub

== Chart positions ==
"Time Won't Let Me Go" entered Billboard's Modern Rock Tracks chart on March 31, 2007 at #40. It peaked at #10 on the chart, giving the band their first top 10 hit. However, it was a massive disappointment in the UK, failing to chart at all, receiving hardly any radio airplay, although it is still tracklisted on Asda FM.

=== Weekly charts ===
Chart (2007)	Peak position
Billboard Hot Modern Rock Tracks	10

=== Year-end charts ===
Chart (2007)	Position
US Alternative Songs (Billboard)	34
