= Stir the Blood =

2009 studio album by the Bravery

Studio album by the Bravery
- Released: December 1, 2009
- Recorded: 2009
- Studio: Dreamland (Hurley, New York); Rusty Bronson's Pleasure Cave (New York City); DNA Downtown (New York City); Clinton (New York City); The Joint (London)
- Genre: Indie rock; post-punk revival
- Length: 35:26
- Label: Island
- Producer: John Hill; Sam Endicott

The Bravery chronology
The Sun and the Moon Complete (2008)	Stir the Blood (2009)

Singles from Stir the Blood
- 1. "Slow Poison" Released: September 13, 2009; 2. "I Am Your Skin" Released: November 6, 2009

Professional ratings
Aggregate scores
Source	Rating
Metacritic	57/100
Review scores
Source	Rating
AllMusic	3.5/5 stars
Alternative Press	3/5 stars
Blare	4/5 stars
NME	6/10
Pitchfork	2.3/10
Rolling Stone	2.5/5 stars
Spin	2/5 stars

Stir the Blood is the third studio album by American rock band the Bravery, released on December 1, 2009, by Island Records. It features the singles "Slow Poison" and "I Am Your Skin".

== Production ==
To record the album, the band headed to Upstate New York and into the woods. The group set up shop for Stir the Blood at Dreamland Recording Studios, a recording facility in an abandoned 1800s church which, years earlier, housed the Pixies for an unnamed project and the B-52's as they recorded "Love Shack". There, as most of the band came in and out, Endicott stayed in a neighboring house for several months as he helmed the producer's desk for the new record, alongside John Hill. Songs like "Slow Poison", "She's So Bendable", "I Am Your Skin" and "Hatef--k" came about as Endicott picked through riffs recorded here and there from the band's tour in support of 2007's The Sun and the Moon. Endicott claims "there is a dark tone to this album" and that "there's an angry undertone to it". "I was pretty pissed off when I wrote a lot of the songs", says Endicott. He also claims that while the lyrics, which also focus on "intimacy", may be dark, the music stays upbeat.

== Album art ==
The cover of the album features a detail from "Carrion Call" by British artist Polly Morgan.

== Singles ==
The first single released, "Slow Poison", has reached numbers 23 and 40 on the US alternative songs and rock songs charts.

The second single, "I Am Your Skin", was released in November 2009 on iTunes.

A music video for the song "Hatef--k" was released in October 2009.

A music video for the song "Slow Poison" was released in November 2009.

A music video for the song "Sugar Pill" was also released in November 2009.

== Track listing ==
All tracks written and composed by Sam Endicott, except where noted.

1. "Adored" – 3:42
2. "Song for Jacob" – 3:23
3. "Slow Poison" – 3:31
4. "Hatef--k" – 2:55
5. "I Am Your Skin" – 3:01
6. "She's So Bendable" (M. Hindert) – 2:21
7. "The Spectator" – 3:50
8. "I Have Seen the Future" – 3:15
9. "Red Hands and White Knuckles" – 3:21
10. "Jack-O'-Lantern Man" – 2:50
11. "Sugar Pill" – 3:17

=== Best Buy bonus tracks ===
12. "Slow Poison" (Villains Remix)
13. "Slow Poison" (Drop the Lime Remix)
14. "Slow Poison" (Of Montreal Remix)

=== iTunes bonus tracks ===
12. "Slow Poison" (Lego My Echo Remix)
13. "Slow Poison" (Roy G and the Biv Remix)

== Personnel ==
- Sam Endicott – lead vocals, rhythm guitar
- Michael Zakarin – lead guitar, backing vocals
- John Conway – keyboards, backing vocals
- Mike Hindert – bass, backing vocals
- Anthony Burulcich – drums, backing vocals

== Charts ==
Chart performance for Stir the Blood
Chart (2009)	Peak position
US Billboard 200	135
US Top Alternative Albums (Billboard)	19
US Top Rock Albums (Billboard)	30
