= House of cards =

Construction set

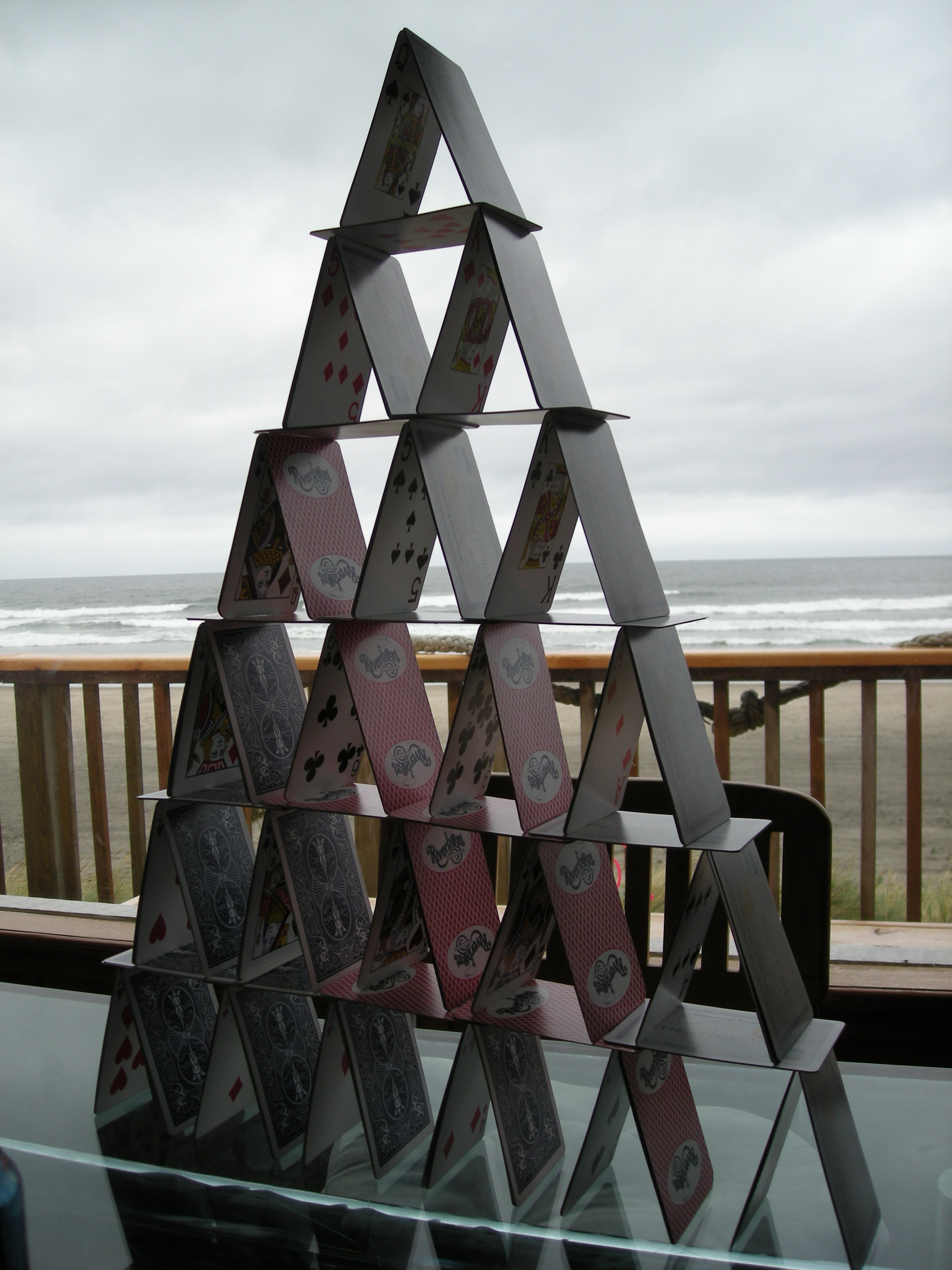
Six-story classic card castle

A house of cards (also known as a card tower or card castle) is a structure created by stacking playing cards on top of each other, often in the shape of a pyramid. "House of cards" is also an expression that dates back to 1645 meaning a structure or argument built on a shaky foundation or one that will collapse if a necessary (but possibly overlooked or unappreciated) element is removed. Structures built by layering in this way, such as Stonehenge, are referred to as "house of cards architecture", which dates back to the Cyclopean and Megalithic ages. The origin of the phrase is debated to be from the 18th century England but some believe that it has an American base.

== Description ==
The structures created using this method rely on nothing more than balance and friction in order to stay upright. Ideally, adhesives or other external connecting methods are not used, and no damage or alterations are made to the cards themselves. The larger the structure, the higher the number of balanced cards that could fail and compromise the integrity of the card building. Professional card stacker and trained architect Bryan Berg claims, however, that the more cards placed on a tower the stronger it becomes because the weight of the cards pushing down on the base (increasing friction) allows occasional cards to stumble without the entire structure collapsing. He also claims that proper stacking technique allows cards to function as shear walls, giving considerable stability to the structure.

Different types of card stacking
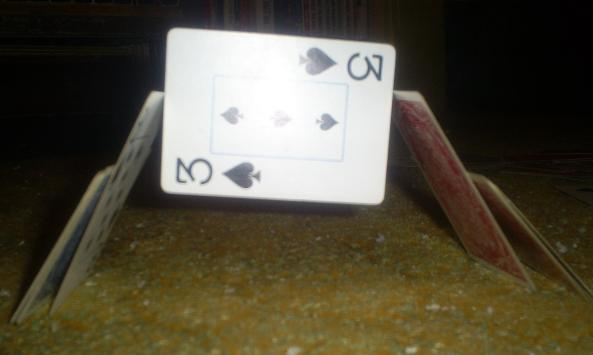
A house of cards balancing a single card between its walls

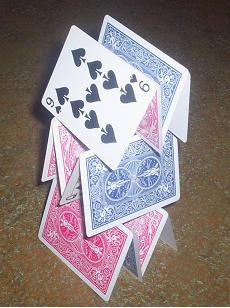
A house of cards, with one level stacked on top of another

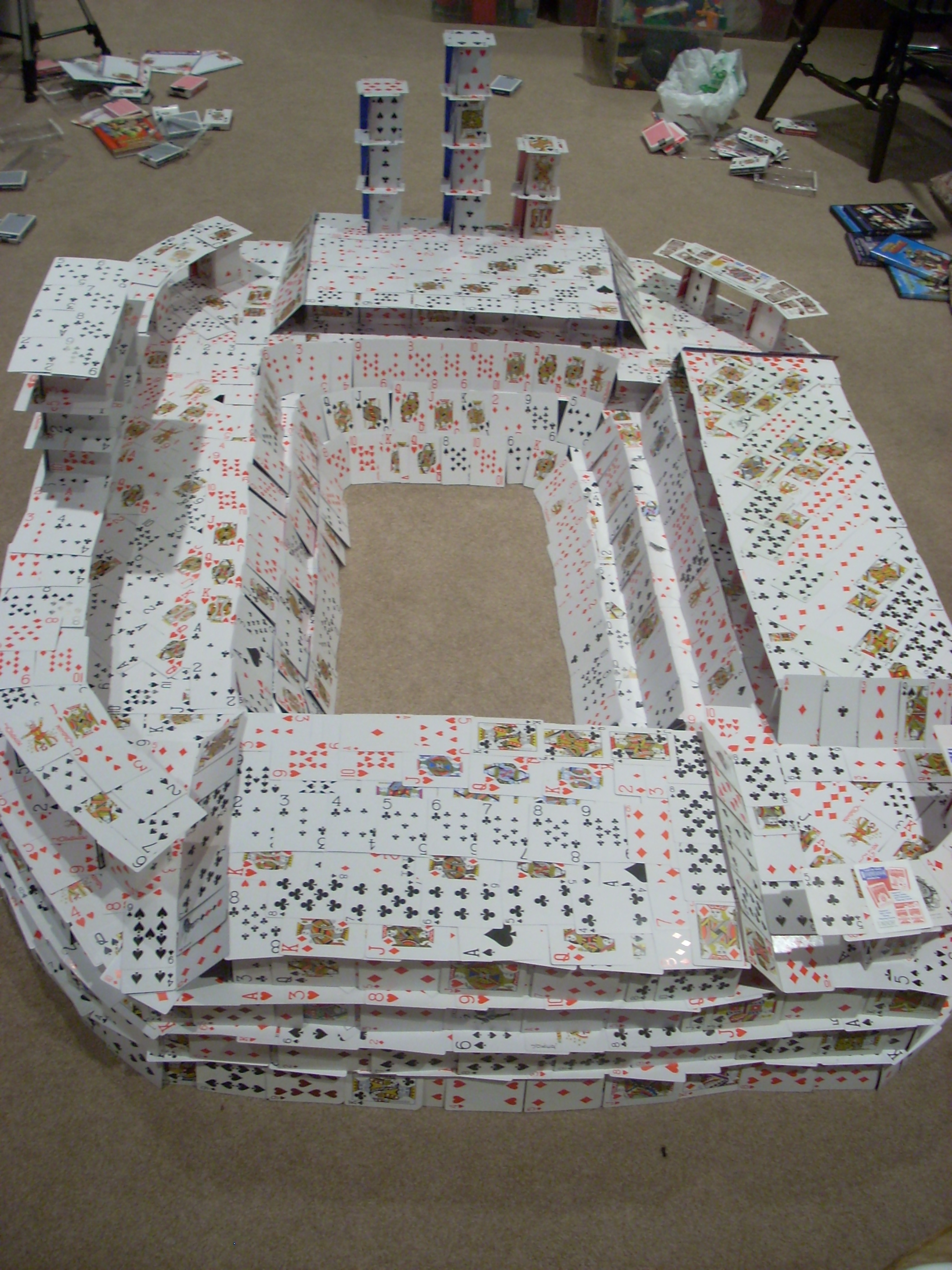
Amateur card stadium, similar in design to Bryan Berg's structures

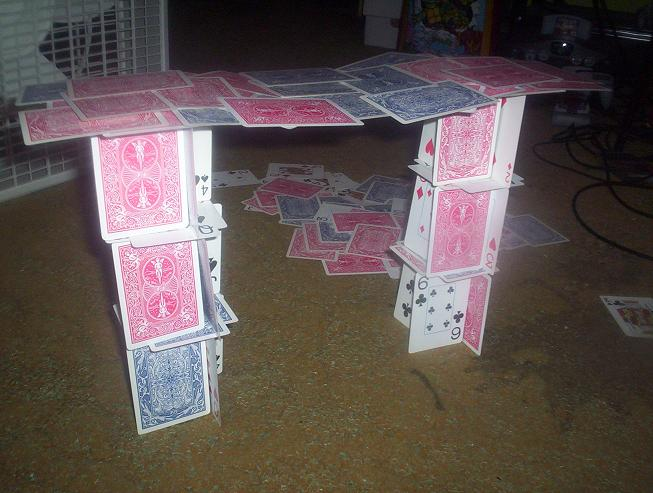
A house of cards with a bridge over the gap between its two pillars

== World records ==
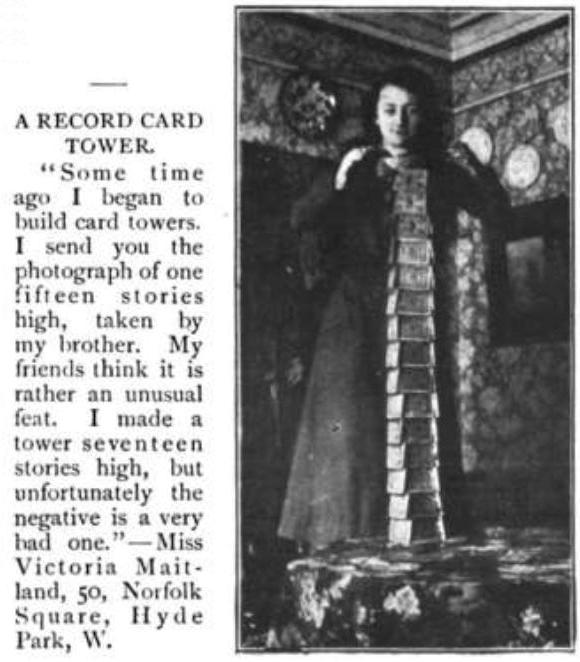
The first known record-setting house of cards originally appeared in The Strand Magazine in September 1901.

The earliest known record for card stacking was achieved by Victoria Maitland, of the United Kingdom. A photograph of her work was published in The Strand Magazine in September 1901. It was a fifteen-story structure. Following the publication of this record, a second was submitted in April 1902 by Rosie Farner of England with a picture of a twenty-storied tower. A third record was submitted by F. M. Hollams of England, with a tower of twenty-five stories, in February 1903.

Other record holders (without bending or altering the cards) include:

- Joe Whitlam, of England, with twenty-seven stories, on February 28, 1972
- James Warnock, of Canada, with sixty-one stories, on September 8, 1978
- John Slain, of the United States, with sixty-eight stories, on August 3, 1983
- Bryan Berg, of the United States, with seventy-five stories, on April 21, 1992

Berg has since kept the record and created many sub-records. He currently holds the world record for tallest house of cards, a 25-foot-9 7/16-inch (7.860 m) "skyscraper" completed at the State Fair of Texas on October 14, 2007. He also holds the record for the largest house of cards, a category Guinness invented for the event, for a replica of Cinderella's Castle at Walt Disney World. On March 10, 2010, Berg broke his own record by building a replica of The Venetian Macao resort hotel. He completed it in 44 days, using 218,792 cards (more than 4,000 decks). The structure measured 10.5 by 3 metres (34.4 by 9.8 ft), and weighed more than 272 kilograms (600 lb).

== See also ==
- Architecture
- Arts and crafts
- Hobby
- Sport stacking
- Structure
