= An Honest Mistake =

2005 single by the Bravery

Single by the Bravery

from the album The Bravery
- B-side: "Hot Pursuit"; "Hey Sunshiney Day"; "Unconditional"
- Released: January 31, 2005
- Genre: Dance-rock; post-punk; dance-punk
- Length: 3:39
- Label: Island
- Songwriter: Sam Endicott
- Producer: Sam Endicott

The Bravery singles chronology
"An Honest Mistake" (2005)	"Fearless" (2005)

"An Honest Mistake" is a song by American rock band the Bravery. It was released as their debut single and the lead single from their self-titled studio album on January 31, 2005. The song peaked at number seven on the UK Singles Chart and number 33 on the Irish Singles Chart.

== Critical reception ==
AllMusic writer MacKenzie Wilson said that the song "saunters like classic New Order with its dark-hued mechanical energy." Lost At Sea's Sarah Peters put the track alongside "Public Service Announcement" for showing the band's honed-in musicianship and knowledge of new wave, saying that when they "hit the airwaves, there shouldn't be too many listeners impressed by the band's amount of study - why analyze and appreciate when you could just dance?" Adam Moerder of Pitchfork Media found the track to be one of the few standouts on the record, calling it "one of the few sassy moments on the album, with Endicott mockingly singing in falsetto "Don't look at me that way / It was an honest mistake."

== Music video ==
The video for "An Honest Mistake" was directed by Mike Palmieri (Foo Fighters, the Strokes) and features the band performing the song apparently surrounded by a Rube Goldberg machine. The chain starts with several strings of dominoes and includes many other objects, such as light bulbs, eggs, and an aquarium. Different parts of the action are shown from multiple views, often showing it one way, switching to another angle, then switching back to the original view. Eventually a flaming arrow shoots toward a target, but misses to the right and the video ends with the band looking mildly disappointed.

== Track listings ==
- UK 7-inch single

A. "An Honest Mistake" – 3:40
B. "Hot Pursuit" (duet version) – 3:04

- UK CD single
1. "An Honest Mistake" – 3:39
2. "Hey Sunshiney Day" – 2:27
- UK DVD single
1. "An Honest Mistake" (video)
2. "Unconditional" (video)
3. The making of "Unconditional"
- Australian CD single
1. "An Honest Mistake"
2. "Hey Sunshiney Day"
3. "No Breaks"
4. "An Honest Mistake" (video)

== Charts ==
=== Weekly charts ===
Weekly chart performance for "An Honest Mistake"
Chart (2005)	Peak position
Australia (ARIA)	87
Ireland (IRMA)	33
Scottish Singles Sales (Official Charts)	6
UK Singles (Official Charts)	7
US Billboard Hot 100	97
US Modern Rock Tracks (Billboard)	12

=== Year-end charts ===
Year-end chart performance for "An Honest Mistake"
Chart (2005)	Position
UK Singles (OCC)	138
US Modern Rock Tracks (Billboard)	31

== Release history ==
Release dates and formats for "An Honest Mistake"
Region	Date	Format(s)	Label(s)	Ref.
United States	January 31, 2005	Modern rock radio	Island	
United Kingdom	February 28, 2005	7-inch vinyl; CD	Loog	
Australia	May 9, 2005	CD	Island	
United States	June 20, 2005	Contemporary hit radio	Island	
