= Matt Bross =

American football player (1903–1989)

No. 6
- Position: Back

Personal information
- Born: December 7, 1904; Great Falls, Montana
- Died: February 8, 1989 (aged 85); Seattle, Washington
- Listed height: 5 ft 9 in (1.75 m)
- Listed weight: 170 lb (77 kg)

Career information
- College: Gonzaga

Career history
- Los Angeles Wildcats (1926); Green Bay Packers (1927)

Career statistics
- Games played: 2
- Games started: 1
- Stats at Pro Football Reference

Matthew A. Bross (December 7, 1903 – February 8, 1989) was an American football back for the Los Angeles Wildcats of the American Football League (AFL) and the Green Bay Packers of the National Football League (NFL). He played college football for Gonzaga.

== Biography ==
Bross was born on December 7, 1904, in Great Falls, Montana.

== Career ==
Bross played at the collegiate level at Gonzaga University. Following his graduation, he played professionally with Ernie Nevers Traveling Circus, an organization that involved two football teams which traveled throughout the South. The following year, Bross played with the Green Bay Packers during the 1927 NFL season. Previously he had played with the Los Angeles Wildcats of the American Football League.
