= American Football League (1926) =

Professional American football league that operated in 1926

- Sport: American football
- Founded: 1926
- First season: 1926
- Folded: 1926
- Claim to fame: first competitor of the National Football League (NFL)
- No. of teams: 9
- Country: United States
- Status: Disbanded
- Last champion: Philadelphia Quakers

The first American Football League (AFL), sometimes called AFL I, AFLG, or the Grange League, was a professional American football league that operated in 1926. It was the first major competitor to the National Football League (NFL). Founded by Charles "C.C." Pyle, with General Charles X. Zimmerman as vice president and starring Hall of Fame halfback Harold Edward "Red" Grange, the short-lived nine-team league struggled to attract fans and players from the more established – then six-year-old – NFL. While Pyle's and Grange's New York Yankees team and the already established Philadelphia Quakers became reliable draws, the lack of star power and the uncertain financial conditions of the other seven teams led to the league's dissolution after one season.

== Origin ==
The controversial ending of the National Football League's 1925 season led to the founding of the first AFL by Red Grange's agent, C. C. Pyle. In an era in which no professional football team had a prearranged schedule (each team was responsible for booking its own games, with virtually no limitations as to the number of games), the Pottsville Maroons were hailed as the NFL champions by several newspapers after Pottsville defeated the Chicago Cardinals on December 6, even though there were still two weeks left in the season.

In order to attract another matchup against the Chicago Bears, Cardinals owner Chris O’Brien arranged for two more games: one against the Milwaukee Badgers the following Thursday, another against the Hammond Pros two days later, even though both teams had already disbanded for the season. Two shutouts (59–0 and 13–0) later, the Cardinals claimed the top spot with an 11–2–1 record. Simultaneous with the Cardinals–Pros game was an exhibition game between Pottsville and an all-star team consisting of former Notre Dame players at Shibe Park, near the home of the Frankford Yellow Jackets, who protested the invasion of territorial rights by the Maroons.

Despite an order from NFL commissioner Joe Carr to cancel the exhibition, the Maroons proceeded to defeat the Notre Dame all-stars 9–7, scoring a field goal in the last minute. Carr immediately canceled the Maroons' scheduled game against the Providence Steam Roller and suspended the franchise. In the league meeting in January 1926, O’Brien refused to accept the championship, but the league record book remained unchanged, showing the Cardinals with an 11–2–1 record to the Maroons’ 10–2–0.

While NFL management was contemplating the penalties for the suspended Pottsville franchise (which was eventually reinstated with the payment of a moderate fine) in December, C. C. “Cash and Carry” Pyle surprised the league by requesting a franchise in New York City for himself and star back Red Grange and secured a five-year lease for baseball's Yankee Stadium, in direct competition to Tim Mara's year-old New York Giants. When Carr announced a ruling in favor of Mara's objection to Pyle's application for NFL membership, Pyle announced the formation of the first American Football League, featuring Grange and the New York Yankees. The NFL charter member Rock Island Independents left the then seven-year-old league to join the new AFL, and the upstart league matched the NFL in having a road team representing Los Angeles.

The new league chose former Princeton athlete, former New York City deputy of street cleaning, and former Newark, New Jersey chief of waste disposal Bill Edwards as its league president and prepared to compete against the older league, (established 1920 and reorganized in 1922), for its talent and spectators. The AFL and NFL went to head-to-head competition in New York (Yankees and Giants), across the East River in Brooklyn (Horsemen and Lions), in Chicago (Bulls vs Bears and Cardinals), and in Philadelphia (Quakers and Yellow Jackets). The AFL's Cleveland Panthers, previously independent, were also preparing to go face-to-face with their hometown counterpart Cleveland Bulldogs, the earlier NFL champions of 1924, when Bulldogs owner Sam Deutsch decided to suspend the operations for 1926.

== Teams ==
The 1926 American Football League had teams playing in nine U.S. markets
- Boston Bulldogs. Coached by Herb Treat, Boston's first professional football team had been in financial difficulty from the beginning, having played only six games before folding in November 1926. Its lack of stars and lack of offense (only three points per game) doomed the franchise as the team failed to score a point in either of its two home games in a nearly empty stadium.
- Brooklyn Horsemen. Coached by Eddie McNeeley, the Horsemen featured Notre Dame Four Horsemen Harry Stuhldreher and Elmer Layden. Unlike the other New York AFL team, Brooklyn suffered at the turnstiles. After only four games, the team was forced to merge with its NFL counterpart (the Lions), played three games in the NFL as the Brooklyn Lions (all shutouts), and folded at the end of the season.
- Chicago Bulls. Owned and coached by Joey Sternaman (brother of Chicago Bears owner Dutch Sternaman), the Bulls featured the younger Sternaman as quarterback. While the Bulls' owner created havoc within the Chicago Cardinals by securing a lease for Comiskey Park (forcing the Cardinals into a much smaller Normal Field) and attempting to sign their star halfback Paddy Driscoll (who wound up on the Bears as a result of a trade), the Bulls quarterback provided the bulk of the team's offense, scoring 52 of the Bulls’ 88 points in 14 games. The Bulls were one of only four AFL teams still playing at the end of the season.
- Cleveland Panthers. The Panthers had existed as an independent team since 1919, mostly playing teams from upstate New York. Coached by Roy Watts, the Panthers featured six players who played for the NFL's Cleveland Bulldogs in the 1925 season: Al Michaels, Al Nesser, Dick Wolf, Dave Noble, Ralph Vince and Doc Elliott. Despite having a potent offense and a winning record, the Panthers drew poorly at home aside from the league-opening game. The team left the AFL hours after losing to the Los Angeles Wildcats road team on October 31; they would return to independent status until folding in 1933.
- Los Angeles Wildcats Named after former University of Washington star halfback Wildcat Wilson and owned by C. C. Pyle and Red Grange, the Wildcats were a traveling team actually based in Rock Island, Illinois. With only one exception, the entire roster consisted of players who competed for colleges located west of the Rockies. One of its 14 games was played in Toronto, Ontario, Canada (December 8: New York won, 28–0). Jim Clark was the head coach.
- Newark Bears. Owned by the New Jersey Athletic Association (William Coughlin, president) and coached by Harold Hansen, the Bears featured a backfield consisting of players who attended college in Georgia at Georgia Tech and Oglethorpe College. The Bears scored a touchdown in its first game, a 7–7 tie with Chicago, and then did not score again in its remaining four games. Newark was the first AFL team to fold, calling it quits after playing Rock Island to a scoreless tie in front of 400 fans on October 24, 1926. For its final game, Newark changed its nickname to the Demons.
- New York Yankees. Coached by Ralph Scott, the Yankees showcased Red Grange, quarterback George Pease, and wingback Eddie Tryon, a backfield who dominated the league in all offensive categories as the team finished in second place with a 10–5 record. While the rest of the league was starving at the turnstiles, the Yankees were a consistent draw. The Yankees were the only AFL team to outlast the league itself: the league dissolved as the Yankees were on a barnstorming tour of the South and West, and the Yankees entered the NFL as a continuation of the just-defunct Brooklyn franchise for the 1927 season. While New York Giants owner Tim Mara was officially the owner of the “new NFL franchise”, he leased it to C. C. Pyle and Red Grange to compete as the Yankees.
- Philadelphia Quakers. The Quakers were a revival of an independent team which played one season in 1921 as an independent, and, before that, as the Union Club of Phoenixville from 1907 to 1920. Owned by Leo Conway and coached by Bob Folwell, the Quakers were the AFL's only league champion, finishing with an 8–2 record and possessing a formidable line anchored by tackles Bull Boehman and Century Milstead. On December 12, 1926, the Quakers played an exhibition game in a snowstorm against the New York Giants in front of 5000 windblown fans, and lost 31–0. Like Chicago and the traveling Wildcats, the Quakers were still alive at the end of the sole AFL season but folded along with the league at the end of the year.
- Rock Island Independents. A charter member of the NFL, the Independents left the established league to make the unique accomplishment of being a charter member of a second professional football league, the AFL. Coached by Johnny Armstrong, the Independents played their first three games at Rock Island and then played the rest of their games as a traveling team before folding on November 21, 1926.

== 1926 AFL standings ==
Team	W	L	T	Pct.	PF	PA	Owner	Colors
Philadelphia Quakers	8	2	0	.800	93	52	L. S. Conway	light blue/gold
New York Yankees	10	5	0	.667	212	82	C. C. Pyle	red/white/blue
Cleveland Panthers	3	2	0	.600	62	46	Charles Zimmerman	brown/gold
Los Angeles Wildcats	6	6	2	.500	105	83	C. C. Pyle	light brown
Chicago Bulls	5	6	3	.455	88	69	Joey Sternaman	orange/black
Boston Bulldogs	2	4	0	.333	20	81	Robert McKirby	dark blue
Rock Island Independents	2	6	1	.250	21	126	A. H. Bowlby	green/white
Brooklyn Horsemen	1	3	0	.250	25	68	Humbert Fugazy	maroon/black
Newark Bears	0	3	2	.000	7	26	William Coughlin^{1}	purple/white

^{1} President of the New Jersey Athletic Association, the organization to whom the franchise was assigned

== League leaders ==
The first AFL did not maintain individual statistics (the same was true of the NFL until 1934). In recent decades, researchers of the history of American football have compiled them from contemporaneous newspaper accounts. The following is reported by David S. Neft, Richard M. Cohen, and Rick Korch in The Football Encyclopedia: The Complete History of Professional Football, From 1892 to the Present.

=== Scoring ===
Name	Team	Pts.
Eddie Tryon	New York	72
Joey Sternaman	Chicago	52
Red Grange	New York	50
Al Kreuz	Philadelphia	34
Dave Noble	Cleveland	31
Wildcat Wilson	Los Angeles	25
Johnny Mohardt	Chicago	24
Adrian Ford	Philadelphia	18
Harry Fry	New York	18
Bob Dinsmore	Philadelphia	17
Mal Bross	Los Angeles	14

8 tied with 12 points each

=== Touchdown Passes ===
Name	Team	TD
George Pease	New York	7
Al Michaels	Cleveland	4
Wildcat Wilson	Los Angeles	4
Red Grange	New York	2
Johnny Scott	Chicago	2
Harry Stuhldreher	Brooklyn	2

8 tied with one touchdown pass each

=== Touchdown Receptions ===
Name	Team	TD
Red Grange	New York	3
Cookie Cunningham	Cleveland	2
Red Maloney	New York	2
Eddie Tryon	New York	2

19 tied with one touchdown catch each

=== Rushing Touchdowns ===
Name	Team	TD
Eddie Tryon	New York	6
Red Grange	New York	4
Johnny Mohardt	Chicago	4
Dave Noble	Cleveland	3
Joey Sternaman	Chicago	3
Duke Morrison	Los Angeles	2

15 tied with one touchdown run each

=== Field Goals ===
Name	Team	FG
Joey Sternaman	Chicago	9
Al Kreuz	Philadelphia	8
Bob Dinsmore	Philadelphia	3
Dave Elliott	Cleveland; Philadelphia	2
Jim Lawson	Los Angeles	2
Dick Reed	Los Angeles	2
Eddie Tryon	New York	1
Art Coglizer	New York	1
Carl Etelman	Boston	1
Erwin Gehrke	Boston	1
Guy Roberts	Cleveland	1

== Demise of the first AFL ==
While the new nine-team AFL was competing against a National Football League that had expanded to twenty-two teams for the 1926 season, optimism yielded to economic reality for both leagues: Most professional football franchises were on financially shaky ground.

The war for talent and audience had a disastrous effect on all but the strongest teams: Of the 31 teams that were in existence across both leagues in 1926, only 12 survived to play in 1927, and 8 folded, while heavy financial losses left the NFL with no option but to eliminate 11 of their 22 teams.

While the Yankees and the Quakers consistently drew large crowds, the rest of the AFL did not, and one by one AFL franchises went out of business, even with the financial assistance of C. C. Pyle.

The first sign of trouble occurred in mid-October, when Rock Island played its last home game (of three consecutive) and started wandering like the Wildcats. The following week, Brooklyn played its third (and last) home game in the AFL, in front of mainly empty stands. On October 24, 1926, the Newark Bears changed its nickname to the Demons, played a scoreless tie with Rock Island, and disbanded hours after the end of the game. The following week saw the Cleveland franchise collapse.

November 1926 was not much brighter for the house of cards that was the American Football League: the Brooklyn Horsemen played the last three games of its existence (all shutout losses) and left the league when it merged with its NFL counterparts, the Lions. By the middle of the month, the Boston Bulldogs folded, as did Rock Island a week later. By Thanksgiving of 1926, there were only four teams operating in the AFL (New York, Chicago, the Wildcats, and Philadelphia), with only the Quakers making a profit for the year, boosted in part by huge attendances stemming from the United States Sesquicentennial celebration, and the very large stadium capable of hosting them, while Pyle was spending his own money to keep the other three teams afloat.

While the Yankees went on a barnstorming tour and the Quakers attempted to arrange for a challenge game between the champions of the two leagues, the Wildcats officially became inactive (in reality, they were touring with the Yankees as the "designated opponent").

After the top six NFL teams had all declined the Quakers' challenge due to scheduling and other issues, the NFL's seventh-place finisher New York Giants accepted, with both parties opting for a game at the Polo Grounds on December 12, 1926. The Quakers' hopes for both football credibility and a financial windfall evaporated as the game was played in a blustery snowstorm, and only 5000 fans witnessed the Giants' complete domination of the AFL champions, with the Giants winning in a 31–0 blowout.

The same day, the Chicago Bulls and the New York Yankees met for the last American Football League game in Comiskey Park: the Yankees won, 7–3, and the league ceased to exist.

== After the AFL ==
While the bulk of the AFL disappeared at the demise of the league, three members had an official existence after the Giants–Quakers game. Although the Brooklyn Horsemen disbanded after its last NFL game, the team's franchise was never withdrawn or cancelled by the league. Tim Mara purchased the franchise and proceeded to lease it to C. C. Pyle for his New York Yankees team. The agreement between the two rivals limited the number of home games that the Yankees were permitted to play in its namesake stadium (four in 1927) and forced Pyle's squad to be primarily a road team displaying the talents of Red Grange. This arrangement lasted for two years: the Yankees were no more after the 1928 season. The Cleveland Panthers, on the other hand, reverted to independent status, and played until 1934.

== See also ==
- American Football League (1936)
- American Football League (1940)
