= The Sun and the Moon Complete =

Remix album by The Bravery
- Released: (United States) March 18, 2008
- Recorded: 2007/ 2008
- Genre: Indie rock, electronica, alternative dance
- Length: 77:34 (both discs total)
- Label: (United States) Island Records (United Kingdom) Polydor Records
- Producer: Brendan O'Brien

The Bravery chronology
The Sun and the Moon (2007)	The Sun and the Moon Complete (2008)	Stir the Blood (2009)

The Sun and the Moon Complete is a remix album by New York-based rock band The Bravery. Disc 1 features the original album released in 2007 and Disc 2 features the same songs as the 2007 album in the same order, re-imagined and re-worked by the band.

== Release ==
There were four promotional songs from Disc 2 (The Moon) released as internet only singles through iTunes every Tuesday leading up to the full release of the album on March 18. The order of their release is as follows:

- Feb 19 - "Believe" (Moon Version)
- Feb 26 - "This Is Not The End" (Moon Version)
- March 4 - "Bad Sun" (Moon Version)
- March 11 - "The Ocean" (Moon Version)
- March 18 - "The Sun And Moon Complete" Album Release

== Disc 1 (The Sun) ==
1. "Intro" – 0:28
2. "Believe" – 3:46
3. "This Is Not the End" – 3:59
4. "Every Word Is a Knife in My Ear" – 3:35
5. "Bad Sun" – 4:02
6. "Time Won't Let Me Go" – 4:11
7. "Tragedy Bound" – 2:22
8. "Fistful of Sand" – 3:10
9. "Angelina" – 3:11
10. "Split Me Wide Open" – 3:38
11. "Above and Below" – 3:30
12. "The Ocean" – 3:40

== Disc 2 (The Moon) ==
1. "Intro (Samples Chopin's Nocturne in E-flat major, Op. 9, No. 2)" – 0:18
2. "Believe" – 3:19
3. "This Is Not the End" – 4:02
4. "Every Word Is a Knife in My Ear" – 2:36
5. "Bad Sun" – 4:24
6. "Time Won't Let Me Go" – 3:51
7. "Tragedy Bound" – 2:26
8. "Fistful of Sand" – 2:59
9. "Angelina" – 3:19
10. "Split Me Wide Open" – 3:33
11. "Above and Below" – 3:11
12. "The Ocean" – 4:03

=== Singles ===
- "Time Won't Let Me Go" - #10 US Modern Rock
- "Believe" - #4 US Modern Rock
