= Charles X. Zimmerman =

United States Army general

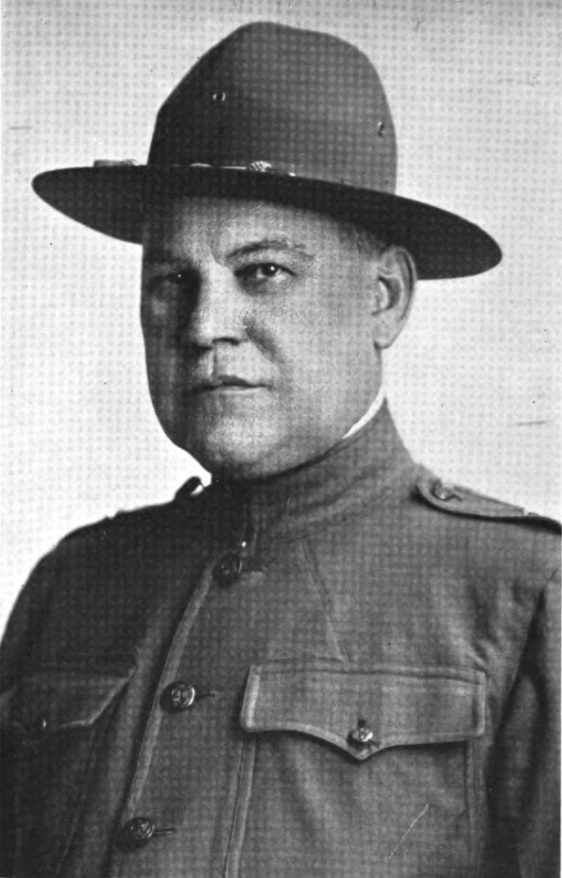
- From 1926's The Thirty-Seventh Division in the World War, 1917-1918
- Born: January 18, 1865; Cleveland, Ohio
- Died: November 14, 1926 (aged 61); New York, New York
- Burial place: Knollwood Cemetery, Mayfield Heights, Ohio
- Military career
- Allegiance: United States of America
- Branch: United States Army; Ohio National Guard
- Service years: 1884–1918
- Rank: Brigadier General
- Commands: 73rd Infantry Brigade
- Conflicts: Spanish–American War; World War I
- Other work: Mayor of Euclid, Ohio (1921); Vice President of the American Football League (1926); Owner of the Cleveland Panthers (1926)

Charles X. Zimmerman (January 18, 1865 – November 14, 1926) was an American brigadier general during World War I, businessman and politician. He was also the vice president of the first American Football League, as well as the owner of the league's Cleveland Panthers.

== Biography ==
=== Military career ===
On May 8, 1884, Zimmerman enlisted in the Fifth Ohio Infantry. He commanded Company F, Fifth Ohio Infantry during the Spanish–American War. He served in the Ohio National Guard and was promoted to brigadier general (NA) on August 5, 1917. Zimmerman was commanding general of the 73rd Infantry Brigade, part of the 37th Infantry Division; he was discharged on February 5, 1919. He served at Camp Sheridan, Alabama, Camp Lee, and Camp Beauregarde, Louisiana. During the Meuse-Argonne Offensive, he served in the defensive sector along with the AEF.

=== Cleveland Panthers ===
In 1946, Zimmerman's "Panthers" moniker was ranked second in a contest sponsored by the Cleveland Plain Dealer for fans to name Cleveland's new All-America Football Conference franchise. Coach Paul Brown did not want the new team named after him, so he looked into naming the club the Panthers. However the team's secretary, George T. Jones, reportedly demanded too much money and the team was instead named the Cleveland Browns.

=== Personal life ===
Zimmerman married twice in his life, first to Anna Hill- who died in December 1897- and then to Ethel Vogt on June 5, 1900. He died unexpectedly in New York City on November 14, 1926. He was buried at Knollwood Cemetery in Mayfield Heights, Ohio.
