= Believe (The Bravery song) =

Song by The Bravery

Single by The Bravery

from the album The Sun and the Moon
- Released: 2007
- Genre: Indie rock
- Length: 3:46
- Label: Island
- Songwriter: Sam Endicott
- Producer: Brendan O'Brien

"Believe" is the second single from the rock band The Bravery's second album The Sun and the Moon. It is the highest charting Modern Rock single for the band, reaching number four. A remixed version of the song appears on The Sun and the Moon Complete. "Believe" was later certified gold by the Recording Industry Association of America on April 10, 2014.

== In media ==
Pontiac used the track in televised adverts as well as on their website to promote their 2006/2007 models. This song also appears on the soundtrack for Madden NFL 08, and was used as the theme song of NFL Network's coverage of the 2008 NFL draft. The song also used on season 2 and season 3 promos of NBC's series Friday Night Lights, the second episode of the CW TV show Reaper, in season 4 of Prison Break, in the second episode of Gossip Girl, in season 1 of 90210 and on the soundtrack for Henry Poole Is Here. It is also a playable track in the Guitar Hero-spinoff Band Hero. The song was also used in a promo for the ABC series FlashForward. The song was also covered on American Idol during a music video used to promote Twilight. The New York Rangers used this song to promote the 2008 playoffs with "I am A Ranger" campaign. Criss Angel used this song for his television program Criss Angel BeLIEve.

== Remix ==
In 2009, Seattle emcee Macklemore and producer Ryan Lewis sampled the song for "Crew Cuts", a track found on their critically acclaimed project, The VS. EP, that celebrated 1980s pop culture.

== Charts and certifications ==
=== Year-end charts ===
Chart (2008)	Position
US Alternative Songs (Billboard)	11

=== Certifications ===
Region	Certification	Certified units/sales
United States (RIAA)	Gold	500,000^{‡}
^{‡} Sales+streaming figures based on certification alone.
