= Los Angeles Wildcats (AFL) =

1926 American football team

General information
- Founded: 1926
- Folded: 1926
- Stadium: Traveling team
- Headquartered: Chicago, Illinois, United States
- Colors: Light Brown, White

Personnel
- Owners: C. C. Pyle; Red Grange; George "Wildcat" Wilson
- Head coach: Jim Clark

Team history
- Los Angeles Wildcats (1926)

League / conference affiliations
- American Football League (1926)

The Los Angeles Wildcats (also reported in various media as Pacific Coast Wildcats, Los Angeles Wilson Wildcats and Wilson's Wildcats) was a traveling team of the first American Football League that was not based in its nominal home city but in Chicago, Illinois (it trained in Rock Island). Coached by Jim Clark, the team was designed to be a showcase for University of Washington star back George “Wildcat” Wilson. Compared to most traveling teams in professional football, the Wildcats were successful, compiling a 6–6–2 record in the only season of the team's – and the league's – existence.

== Origin ==
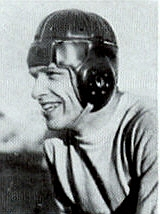
Wildcat Wilson in 1926

The existence of the Wildcats began with the 1926 formation of the American Football League by C. C. Pyle, a sports agent who represented star back Red Grange. Pyle's application for a National Football League franchise in New York was rejected because Tim Mara, owner of the New York Giants, objected to Pyle's proposed intrusion into the Giants’ territory. Armed with a five-year lease at Yankee Stadium, Pyle subsequently announced the formation of the American Football League as a showcase for his client.

The league was also a showcase for another Pyle client who was an All-American on the West Coast: Wildcat Wilson. Because of the limitations of train (or bus) travel, the National Football League extended only from the Atlantic coast westward to Kansas City, Missouri, and Pyle wanted to tap the talent of college football players along the Pacific. His solution was novel (and one that the more established NFL would copy quickly): establish a traveling team nominally representing Los Angeles and headed by Wilson. The team would be based in Moline, Illinois (home of the Rock Island Independents, which jumped from the NFL to the AFL) and would have no home stadium. Virtually all of the players of the team attended colleges sited west of the Rocky Mountains.

The team was owned by C. C. Pyle and Red Grange, who also owned another AFL team (the New York Yankees) and had stock in a third (the Chicago Bulls). The three teams and league champion Philadelphia Quakers were the only four teams (of the original nine) still in existence at the end of league play on December 12, 1926. Upon the completion of a barnstorming tour, the Wildcats closed up shop after only one year of existence.

== American Football League ==
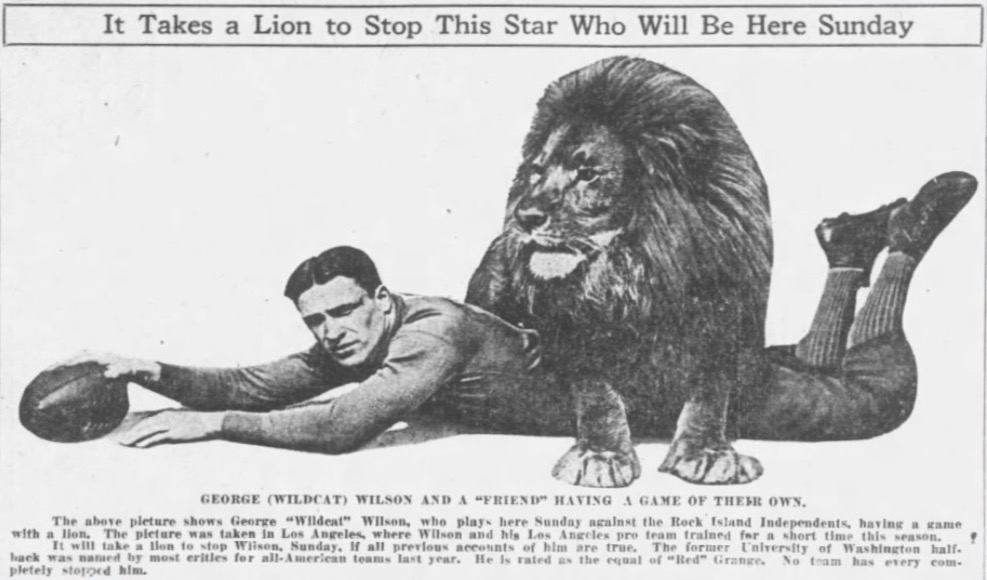
Promotional image of Wildcat Wilson and a lion, from The Rock Island Argus of September 23, 1926

As the team began league play, it became evident that Wilson was not the only weapon that the Wildcats had. Coach Jim Clark had the versatile Mal Bross for either rushing and receiving duties; ends Ray Flaherty and Jim Lawson dutifully caught passes from Wilson, while Duke Morrison ran when Wilson did not take the ball. Furthermore, no fewer than four Wildcats handled the kicking job at one time or another.

Originally scheduled to play only 10 games, the Wildcats played additional contests as last-minute “fill-in” opponents as one team after another in the American Football League folded or otherwise left the league. Immediately after tying the Chicago Bulls in Comiskey Park, the team trekked to Toronto’s Maple Leaf Stadium for a game with the New York Yankees, who also played games on back-to-back days. The Yankees won, 29–0. It was not the first weekend in which the Wildcats played on consecutive days (they actually did so on three other weekends); their Thanksgiving Day contest with the Bulls (a scoreless tie) was their third in a five-day stretch.

By the end of October, the Cleveland Panthers and Newark Bears had closed up shop; the Brooklyn Horsemen merged with their NFL cousins, the Brooklyn Lions, in early November, and the Boston Bulldogs, a team that was subsidized by Pyle's money, dropped out. In the four weeks following the departure of Cleveland and the exit of Boston, scheduling “holes” were filled by the two traveling teams of the AFL, the Wildcats and the Rock Island Independents, until November 21, when the Independents – charter members of both the NFL and the AFL – joined the exodus from the younger league by calling it quits after a 3–0 loss to the Bulls. With only two weeks remaining in the season, the Wildcats, Yankees, and Bulls – three teams owned (or co-owned) by Pyle and Grange – and the Philadelphia Quakers were the last teams remaining, with only the Quakers reporting a profit.

Only two official AFL games were left to play in December 1926. On the 5th, the Wildcats shut out the Bulls 5–0 on a frozen field in Comiskey Park, while the Bulls hosted the Yankees the following Sunday as the visiting team wrapped up the 1926 season of the American Football League with a 7–3 victory. At the same time, in a snowstorm at the Polo Grounds, the league champion Quakers were crushed, 31–0, by the New York Giants in a game that marked the end of the American Football League, December 12, 1926.

Year	W	L	T	Finish	Coach
1926	6	6	2	4th	Jim Clark

== After the first AFL ==
Two days after the end of the 1926 season (and of the AFL), the Wildcats and the New York Yankees started a series of exhibition games as the two Pyle-owned teams went on a barnstorming tour of the American South and West. The two teams competed in Atlanta (a 7–7 draw), Birmingham, Alabama (a 14–3 Yankees win), Dallas, Texas (a 17-14 Yankees win), Beaumont, Texas (a 34–0 Wildcats win), and San Antonio (a 20–14 Yankees win) before traveling to California for games against the independent Hollywood Generals (whom the Wildcats defeated, 26–7, in Wrigley Field of Los Angeles) and the NFL's traveling team, the Los Angeles Buccaneers (the Wildcats won, 17–0, in a game played in San Francisco).

With the dissolution of the American Football League (Pyle's Yankees were preparing to join the NFL under an arrangement with New York Giants owner Tim Mara, who acquired the assets of the defunct Brooklyn Horsemen), the Wildcats ceased to exist after the game in San Francisco. Wildcat Wilson joined the Providence Steam Roller for the 1927 NFL season. Wilson was not the only 1926 Wildcat to join an NFL roster for the 1927 season:

- Mal Bross – Green Bay Packers
- Ted Bucklin – Chicago Cardinals
- Walden Erickson – Pottsville Maroons
- Ray Flaherty – New York Yankees
- Ted Illman – Chicago Cardinals
- Jim Lawson – New York Yankees
- Ray Stephens – New York Yankees
- John Vesser – Chicago Cardinals

Flaherty continued to play until 1935 (taking 1930 off to teach college football), then became head coach of the Washington Redskins in 1937. He became a member of the Pro Football Hall of Fame in 1976.

== See also ==
- Los Angeles Buccaneers
