= The Sun and the Moon (The Bravery album) =

2007 studio album by the Bravery

Studio album by the Bravery
- Released: May 22, 2007
- Recorded: 2006
- Studios: Southern Tracks (Atlanta); Henson (Hollywood); Bushwick (New York City); Silent Sound (Atlanta)
- Genres: Indie rock; post-punk revival
- Length: 39:37
- Label: Island
- Producer: Brendan O'Brien

The Bravery chronology
The Bravery (2005)	The Sun and the Moon (2007)	The Sun and the Moon Complete (2008)

Singles from The Sun and the Moon
- 1. "Time Won't Let Me Go" Released: March 27, 2007; 2. "Believe" Released: 2007

The Sun and the Moon is the second studio album by American rock band the Bravery, released on May 22, 2007, by Island Records. The album was produced by Brendan O'Brien.

The album's title comes from lyrics in both "Angelina" and "The Ocean".

== Reception ==
=== Critical reception ===
Professional ratings
Aggregate scores
Source	Rating
Metacritic	62/100
Review scores
Source	Rating
AllMusic	3/5 stars
The A.V. Club	B
Blender	3.5/5 stars
The Boston Globe	9/10
Entertainment Weekly	B+
Pitchfork	1.8/10
PopMatters	6/10
Rolling Stone	2.5/5 stars

The Sun and the Moon received mixed reviews from music critics. It currently holds a 62/100 on Metacritic with reviewers such as The Boston Globe awarding the album a 9/10 and saying, "This easily ranks among the top rock records of the year." Other publications, while giving it a positive review, said it was a slight slump compared to their self-titled debut, although noting the slump was not as great as those from the Kaiser Chiefs, Bloc Party and Editors. Pitchfork wrote a scathing review, rating the album 1.8 and ending their review with the question "Have you no sense of decency, Bravery?".

=== Commercial performance ===
The album debuted at number 24 on the US Billboard 200, selling 22,000 copies in its first week.

== Track listing ==
All tracks are written by Sam Endicott.

No.	Title	Length
1.	"Intro" (featuring Chopin's Nocturne Op. 9, No. 2 on the Moon version)	0:28
2.	"Believe"	3:46
3.	"This Is Not the End"	3:59
4.	"Every Word Is a Knife in My Ear"	3:35
5.	"Bad Sun"	4:02
6.	"Time Won't Let Me Go"	4:11
7.	"Tragedy Bound"	2:22
8.	"Fistful of Sand"	3:10
9.	"Angelina"	3:11
10.	"Split Me Wide Open"	3:38
11.	"Above and Below"	3:30
12.	"The Ocean"	3:40
Total length:		39:37

=== Bonus tracks ===
- "Rat in the Walls" – 3:03 (Best Buy bonus disc)
- "Faces" – 2:56 (Best Buy bonus disc)
- "Who Left Me Out?" – 2:33 (Newbury Comics/Rhino Records bonus disc)
- "Sorrow" – 2:25 (Newbury Comics/Rhino Records bonus disc)
- "The Dandy (Rock)" – 3:33 (German iTunes Store)

== Personnel ==
- Sam Endicott – lead vocals, rhythm guitar
- Michael Zakarin – lead guitar, backing vocals
- John Conway – keyboards, backing vocals
- Mike Hindert – bass, backing vocals
- Anthony Burulcich – drums, backing vocals

== Charts ==
Chart performance for The Sun and the Moon
Chart (2007)	Peak position
US Billboard 200	24
US Top Rock Albums (Billboard)	7
Canada (Nielsen SoundScan)	34
