= Myles D. Evans =

American football player and coach (1901–1982)

Biographical details
- Born: December 3, 1901; Cleveland, Ohio, U.S.
- Died: November 11, 1982 (aged 80); Lakewood, Ohio, U.S.

Playing career
- 1923: Ohio Wesleyan
- 1926: Cleveland Panthers
- Positions: Tackle, guard

Coaching career (HC unless noted)
- 1928–1930: Hiram

Head coaching record
- Overall: 4–19

Myles D. "Mike" Evans (December 3, 1901 – November 11, 1982) was an American football player and coach. He served as the head football coach at Hiram College from 1928 to 1930, compiling a record of 4–19.
