= The Bravery =

American rock band

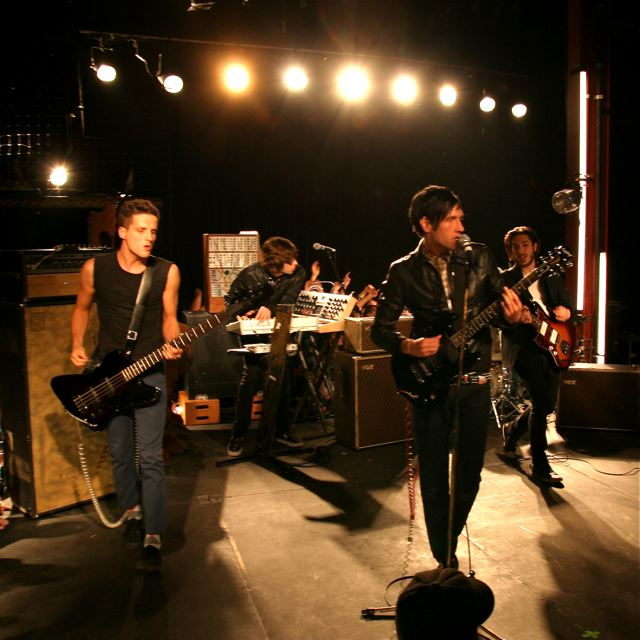
- The Bravery at the video shoot for "Believe"

Background information
- Origin: New York City, New York, U.S.
- Genres: Indie rock; post-punk revival; dance-punk; synth-pop; alternative rock
- Years active: 2003–2011; 2021–present
- Labels: Island; Universal
- Members: Sam Endicott; John Conway; Anthony Burulcich; Michael Zakarin; Mike Hindert
- Website: thebravery.com

The Bravery is an American rock band formed in New York City in 2003. The band consists of lead vocalist Sam Endicott, guitarist Michael Zakarin, keyboardist John Conway, bassist Mike Hindert and drummer Anthony Burulcich. They are best known for their 2005 top 10 UK single "An Honest Mistake" and their certified gold 2008 single "Believe". Before their initial split, they released three studio albums: The Bravery (2005), The Sun and the Moon (2007) and Stir the Blood (2009). They also released a remixed edition of their second album, called The Sun and the Moon Complete, in 2008, as well as an Internet live album called Live at the Wiltern Theater in 2010. The group's music is mostly post-punk, dance-influenced rock.

The band was inactive from the early 2010s onward, with Endicott confirming the band's indefinite hiatus in April 2014. On July 31, 2021, The Bravery's website confirmed the return of the group.

== History ==
=== Formation and rising fame (2003) ===
Frontman-songwriter Sam Endicott and keyboardist John Conway were classmates at Vassar College in Poughkeepsie, New York. The two began a musical partnership, playing together in various bands in the Poughkeepsie area including Skabba the Hut with future CSI: Miami star Jonathan Togo. After graduating, Endicott and Conway moved to New York City, where Endicott switched from bass guitar to vocals and began writing music that would later become The Bravery.

Guitarist Michael Zakarin joined after answering an advert in a local paper, and brought with him bassist Mike Hindert, a classmate of his from Georgetown University in Washington, D.C. Drummer Anthony Burulcich was living in Boston, Massachusetts, where he had studied percussion at Berklee College of Music. After his sister's death, Burulcich moved back to his childhood home in Long Island New York to be with his family. On the day Burulcich was moving, while driving with his belongings in a U-Haul truck, Endicott called him.

The band played their first gig at the Stinger Club in Brooklyn in November 2003. To promote their local shows, they manufactured 1,000 posters and 3 song CD samplers containing the songs "An Honest Mistake", "No Brakes" and "Public Service Announcement". Both items featured the iconic "Phoenix" image by New York artist C. Finley. The same artwork later became the cover of The Bravery's debut album. The band self promoted themselves by handing out CDs and postering the Lower East Side of Manhattan and Brooklyn. The band also promoted themselves on the internet and were one of the first bands on MySpace to have a profile. Their MySpace profile pointed to thebravery.com, where the same three songs were available as downloadable MP3s.

=== Unconditional EP (2004) ===
After a few months of headlining and selling out small clubs, The Bravery booked a residency at the Lower East side club Arlene's Grocery. The Bravery played every Thursday at 10pm in May 2004. Every show sold out and garnered the attention of many record labels. Around the same time, the band received their first radio airplay on the show Alter Ego hosted by Paul Driscoll on Boston's WFNX. Aaron Axeleson at Live 105 in San Francisco and Zane Lowe at BBC Radio 1 in the UK, also downloaded the MP3 of "An Honest Mistake" from thebravery.com. With three major radio stations around the world playing the MP3 of "An Honest Mistake" and sold-out shows in New York, The Bravery signed in August 2004 to Island Def Jam in the United States and Loog Records in the UK.

For the month of November 2004, The Bravery moved to the Stoke Newington part of London. The band imported their residency idea to London playing every Thursday at The Metro Club in Soho. The band toured the entire UK, France and the Netherlands between Thursdays. The band also opened shows for Yeah Yeah Yeahs and Razorlight.

Loog Records released the Unconditional EP, a limited edition 3 song EP on CD and 12" vinyl containing the songs "Unconditional", "No Brakes" and "Out of Line". NME wrote, "Unconditional already has the time-worn feel of an indie classic." The cover was taken from C. Finley's oil on canvas named Colab. "Unconditional" received heavy airplay on Radio 1 and XFM London.

The Bravery played New Year's Eve of 2005 at the Motherfucker Party in New York City.

The Village Voice proclaimed the Bravery to be "New York's Official Next Big Thing", while MTV and Rolling Stone hailed them as an artist to watch. The band were also tipped in the BBC News website's Sound of 2005 poll as 2005's #1 most promising act.

=== The Bravery (2005–2006) ===
The Bravery's first single, "An Honest Mistake", was released in the UK on February 28, 2005, and debuted at No. 7 on the UK Singles Chart. The single reached No. 12 on the US Modern Rock Chart. The CD single contained the b-side "Hey Sunshiney Day". The 7" Vinyl contained the b-side "Hot Pursuit (Duet Version)", a duet with lead singer Sam Endicott and Gillian Conway (sister of keyboard player John Conway). The Bravery's second single, "Fearless" was released in the UK on May 23, 2005. The single's slimline CD featured a cover of "An Cat Dubh" by U2 as the b-side. The b-side for the 7" vinyl was a cover of The Cars' "It's All I Can Do". The DVD single contained the Fearless Video as well as live footage of "No Brakes" recorded at club Koko in London on March 1, 2005. C. Finley's artwork entitled "Lady With A Blunt" was used as the cover art. The "Unconditional" single was released in the UK on August 29, 2005. The slimline CD single contained a Michael Brauer radio Mix as the A-side and a Benny Benassi dance remix as the b-side. The remix reached the top 10 on the UK dance charts. The Maxi single contained the b-sides "Oh, Glory" and "An Honest Mistake" remix by Superdiscount. The CD was enhanced with the video for "Unconditional". "Phoenix Girl", an acrylic and graphite drawing on paper by C. Finley's was used for the cover art.

The Bravery, was released on March 14, 2005, in the UK (March 29, 2005 in the US). It debuted No. 5 on the UK Album Chart and No. 15 on the Irish Chart. C. Finley's painting "Phoenix" was used as the cover art. The first 10,000 copies in the UK were made with a silver foil cover and a black embossed Phoenix. The band was featured on the cover of the March 12 issue of NME. The album was released in Europe on April 4, 2005. The band was featured on the cover of the French music magazine Magic. Australia released the album on May 4. "An Honest Mistake" became a top ten hit on Triple J radio in Australia.

On May 28, 2005, The Bravery played three shows in one day, taking a helicopter from Homelands festival in Winchester, to Birmingham for Duran Duran's concert at the Birmingham City soccer ground, and then on to London. The Bravery's last show of the day was the first of three sold out headlining shows at the Astoria. On June 14, 2005, The Bravery supported the opening night of U2's European tour in Manchester, UK. During The Bravery's opening song "Rites of Spring", the power failed on stage. The band left the stage coming back 10 minutes later, only to have the power shut off again. Bono wrote a letter to the band thanking them, stating "P.S. If you ever need anything, call Edge, Adam or Larry". The Bravery went on to support other European dates for U2 including a sold out 90,000 capacity Croke Park concert in Dublin on June 27. The Bravery played at Glastonbury Festival on June 26, 2005. Their set was due to be aired live on BBC Three in the daytime, but had to be shown well after the watershed, as bass guitarist Mike Hindert stripped naked on stage due to the hot weather and threw himself into the drumkit to end their set. A photograph of Hindert's buttocks on stage with 40,000 people in the distance was featured in the following issue of the NME and Blender Magazine. His nakedness is now immortalized on film in Julien Temple's Glastonbury The Film. Throughout 2005, The Bravery sold out headlining shows all over the world and played some of the largest festivals including SXSW, Coachella Music Festival, Glastonbury and Lollapalooza. In November and December 2005 and January through March 2006, the band was the supporting act for Depeche Mode on their Touring the Angel world tour. The tour traveled all over the US, UK and Europe.

=== The Sun and the Moon (2007–2008) ===
US modern rock radio stations received the CD for The Bravery's first single "Time Won't Let Me Go" the same week as the band played in New York, Los Angeles, San Francisco and the SXSW festival. The single reached the Alternative Top Ten Hit in America.

On May 22, 2007, The Bravery's second album, The Sun and the Moon, was released, debuting at No. 24 on the US album charts. Endicott described the new album as a departure from the synth-heavy sound of their debut. The cover and artwork are candid photographs taken by Jo McCaughey and Drew King. Endicott and art designer Andy West took a newsprint/collage approach to the album's layout. The Bravery's second single "Believe" reached No. 4 on the US Alternative Charts in April 2008, 11 months after the original release of the album. "Believe" stayed at No. 4 for six weeks, becoming the band's biggest radio hit to date.

Two weeks before the release, The Bravery played a number of special shows in New York City, including two secret shows on May 8 at Arlene's Grocery, the very club that the band credits as the club where they were discovered. The Bravery toured extensively in the US, headlining dates until June. The band headed to Europe on their own headlining tour, stopping to play in Oxegen and T in the Park festivals. Between July and September, The Bravery supported Incubus on their outdoor amphitheatre summer tour. The band then supported The Smashing Pumpkins on their US theatre tour. In October, The Bravery headed to Mexico where they played Motorkr Festival in Mexico City. They finished 2007 headlining more dates in the US.

iTunes announced The Bravery as the first artist ever to pre-release a different song every week prior to the album release. On February 19, 2008, the first single, a re-recording of "Believe" debuted on iTunes. A song a week followed: "This Is Not the End" was released on February 26, "Bad Sun" on March 4 and "The Ocean" on March 11.

While on the road, The Bravery continued working on The Moon recording in the back of their tour bus, in hotels and dressing rooms. In December 2007, The Bravery headed back into their New York City home studios to finish up their more raw and electronic version of the songs. In January 2008, the band announced the new release of The Sun and the Moon Complete, a two-disc set featuring The Sun (the original Brendan O'Brien-produced 12 songs) and The Moon (the same exact 12 songs, in the same order, but re-imagined and re-worked by the band). It was released on March 18, 2008. A new album cover and packaging accompany the two-disc set. The Bravery's single "Believe" reached number four on the Modern Rock Charts during the week of April 13, 2008. It is the highest chart position for the band in the United States. "Believe" stayed at number 4 for six weeks. "Believe" went on to become a certified gold single in the United States.

After a disagreement with the band's UK label, The Sun and The Moon was never released in the UK. Endicott addressed the issue for the first time in public during a feature in the November 4, 2009 issue of the NME. "The big thing was the BBC counted us as the best new band of the year and at that point our label lost its shit. We got off a plane in London and there were billboards of us on the highway. Suddenly we weren't this indie band, we were the Spice Girls!" The band has since been in a legal battle with their UK label over the rights of The Sun and The Moon and the band's future releases.

=== Stir the Blood (2009) ===
Keyboardist John Conway posted on the band's blog that The Bravery were in the studio with producer John Hill, who has previously worked with Santigold and M.I.A., and that new tunes were "already taking shape". Throughout summer 2009, The Bravery performed songs from their forthcoming third studio album at various shows, including those whilst supporting Green Day on their 21st Century Breakdown North American Tour. These include "Hatef--k" and "Red Hands and White Knuckles".

In a Billboard feature, Enidcott describes the new album as "more like the first record (in 2005) in that there's a lot of electronics on it, but it still sounds very human. It's also like the first record in that it's a party album. It's uptempo, fun music, although it does have a range of things. There are slower, dreamy songs, and our bass player (Mike Hindert) wrote a song ('She Is So Bendable') that sounds like a '50s ballad."

The first single "Slow Poison" debuted on September 8, 2009. Sam called into these morning shows to debut The Bravery's new single: KROQ – Los Angeles, WRXP – New York, WFNX – Boston, The End – Seattle, 91X – San Diego, The Edge – Phoenix. The video for "Slow Poison" premiered on AOL Spinner Friday November 6, 2009. Another video directed by bass player Mike Hindert for the song "Sugar Pill" was released on November 19, 2009.

On October 1, 2009, The Bravery leaked a video for their new song "Hatef--k" via the band's MySpace page. The disturbing video was directed by bass player Mike Hindert and depicts a sadomasochistic scene where the female character wearing a gas mask cuts a vagina into the male character using a knife. Mermaid dolls then enter into the orifice.

The Bravery headlined an entire North American tour prior to the Stir the Blood, December 1, 2009 release. Fans were able to meet the band after pre-ordering the album. An iTunes pre-order for the album began on Tuesday, November 10. New song "I Am Your Skin" was made available to download when pre-ordering the album.

Like The Sun and The Moon, Stir the Blood was not released in the UK due to a legal battle with the UK label.

=== Live at the Wiltern Theater (2010–2011) ===
Live At The Wiltern Theater was the Bravery's first live album and concert film. The iTunes exclusive was released on June 8, 2010, and chronicles the Bravery's sold-out performance at the Wiltern Theater in Los Angeles from November 5, 2009. The digital only release features all 18 songs from the show including the band's hits, "An Honest Mistake", "Believe", "Time Won't Let Me Go", "Unconditional", and "Slow Poison". The official iTunes review states "it's obvious that the NYC quintet has a symbiotic relationship with their audience—the more the crowd gives, the more the band delivers."

On June 2, 2010, a brand new Bravery song entitled "Ours" was released on The Twilight Saga: Eclipse: Soundtrack through Atlantic Records. This was the first Bravery song to be released in the UK since their certified gold debut album in 2005.

On December 9, 2010, the band announced a UK tour and London residency for February 2011. The band's social media sites stated "The group, whose last UK album release was their Gold-selling, Top 5 debut in 2005, have resolved a legal dispute with their former record label and will go on to release a new single and album following a residency at London's Hoxton Bar and Kitchen and further UK shows." At the SXSW 2011 The Bravery performed "Gin and Juice" with Dennis Quaid singing the vocals.

=== Hiatus (2012–2021) ===
Burulcich toured as Morrissey's drummer from 2012 to 2013. In July 2013, Burulcich started playing drums for Weezer, as drummer Patrick Wilson was on personal leave. Burulcich toured as the drummer for White Sea in 2014, and Weezer guitarist Brian Bell's band The Relationship. Mike Hindert started the record label Merrifield Records, and went on to work as a director. John Conway became a wine maker with his business, Conway Family Wines. Zakarin pursued other creative interests outside of music. Endicott became lead vocalist in the band The Mercy Beat, with Burulcich playing drums for the band. In April 2014, Endicott confirmed through The Bravery's website and Facebook page that all the members were taking part in separate avenues of creative interests and that there were no plans for The Bravery in the foreseeable future.

=== Reunion (2021–present) ===
On July 31, 2021, the band posted a notice to their website and social media, hinting at a return. The Bravery would reunite for a show at Rickshaw Stop in San Francisco in late 2021.

In September 2021, the band were announced on the bill for the Corona Capital Festival in Mexico City alongside Tame Impala and Twenty One Pilots.

On January 17, 2023, the band were announced on the bill for the Just Like Heaven festival in Pasadena, California. The festival appearance marked the band's first in the United States for over a decade.

== Collaborations ==
While recording the Bravery's Stir the Blood album, Sam Endicott and John Hill co-wrote three songs for the Shakira album She Wolf (2009), including the single "She Wolf" and "Men In This Town". "She Wolf" peaked at No. 1 in Latin America, No. 2 in Germany, Ireland, Italy, Estonia and Spain, No. 3 in Switzerland and Austria, No. 4 in the UK, France and Greece, No. 5 in Canada and Belgium, No. 6 in Finland, No. 9 in Japan as well as No. 11 in the US. The third song "Devoción" is featured on Shakira's 2010 Spanish album Sale El Sol. Bravery drummer Anthony Burulcich played drums on Shakira's song "Tu Boca" on the album Sale El Sol.

Endicott, Hill and artist Santigold co-wrote "Monday Morning", a song for Christina Aguilera's album Bionic (2010). Dan Martin of the NME wrote in his album review of Bionic: "Perhaps best of all is 'Monday Morning'. Written with Santigold and The Bravery's Sam Endicott, it's a Day-Glo disco jam that sounds like Gwen Stefani doing 'Borderline'."

== Band members ==
- Sam Endicott – lead vocals, rhythm guitar
- Michael Zakarin – lead guitar, backing vocals
- John Conway – keyboards, backing vocals
- Mike Hindert – bass, backing vocals
- Anthony Burulcich – drums, backing vocals

== Discography ==
Studio albums

- The Bravery (2005)
- The Sun and the Moon (2007)
- Stir the Blood (2009)
