= Sam Endicott =

American musician

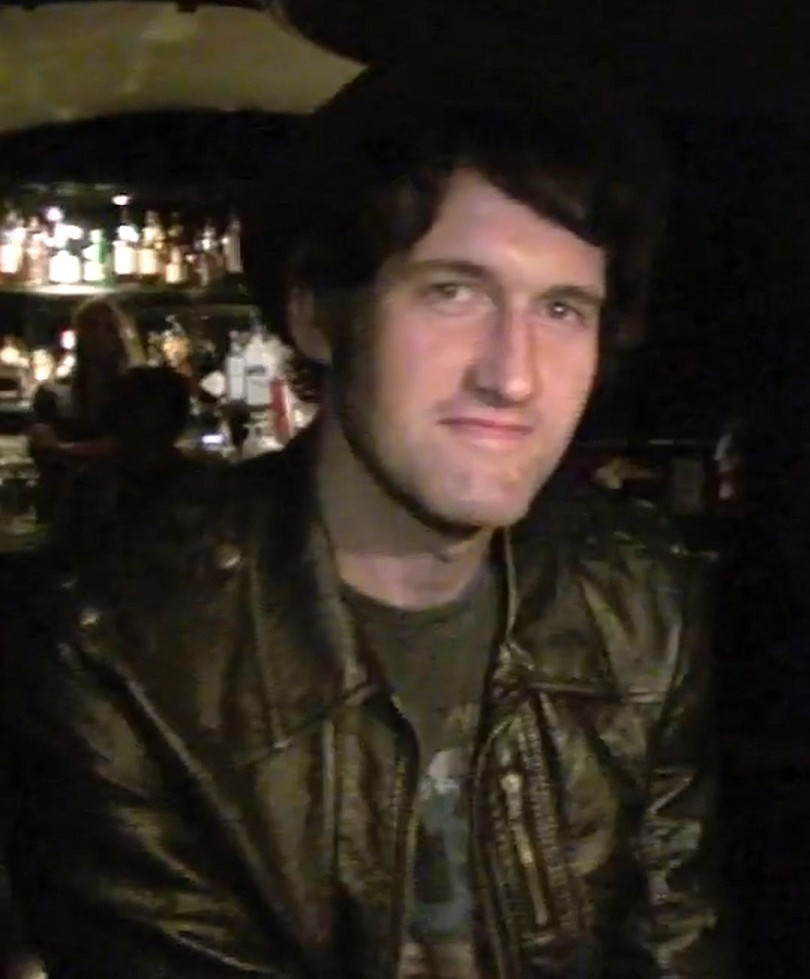
- Endicott in 2010

Background information
- Born: Samuel Bingham Endicott; August 13, 1974 (age 52)
- Genre: Alternative rock
- Occupations: Singer, songwriter, musician
- Instruments: Vocals, keyboards, guitar, bass
- Years active: 1985–present

Samuel Bingham Endicott (born August 13, 1974) is an American singer, songwriter, multi-instrumentalist, actor and director. He is best known as the lead vocalist of The Bravery with whom he recorded three studio albums.

== Career ==
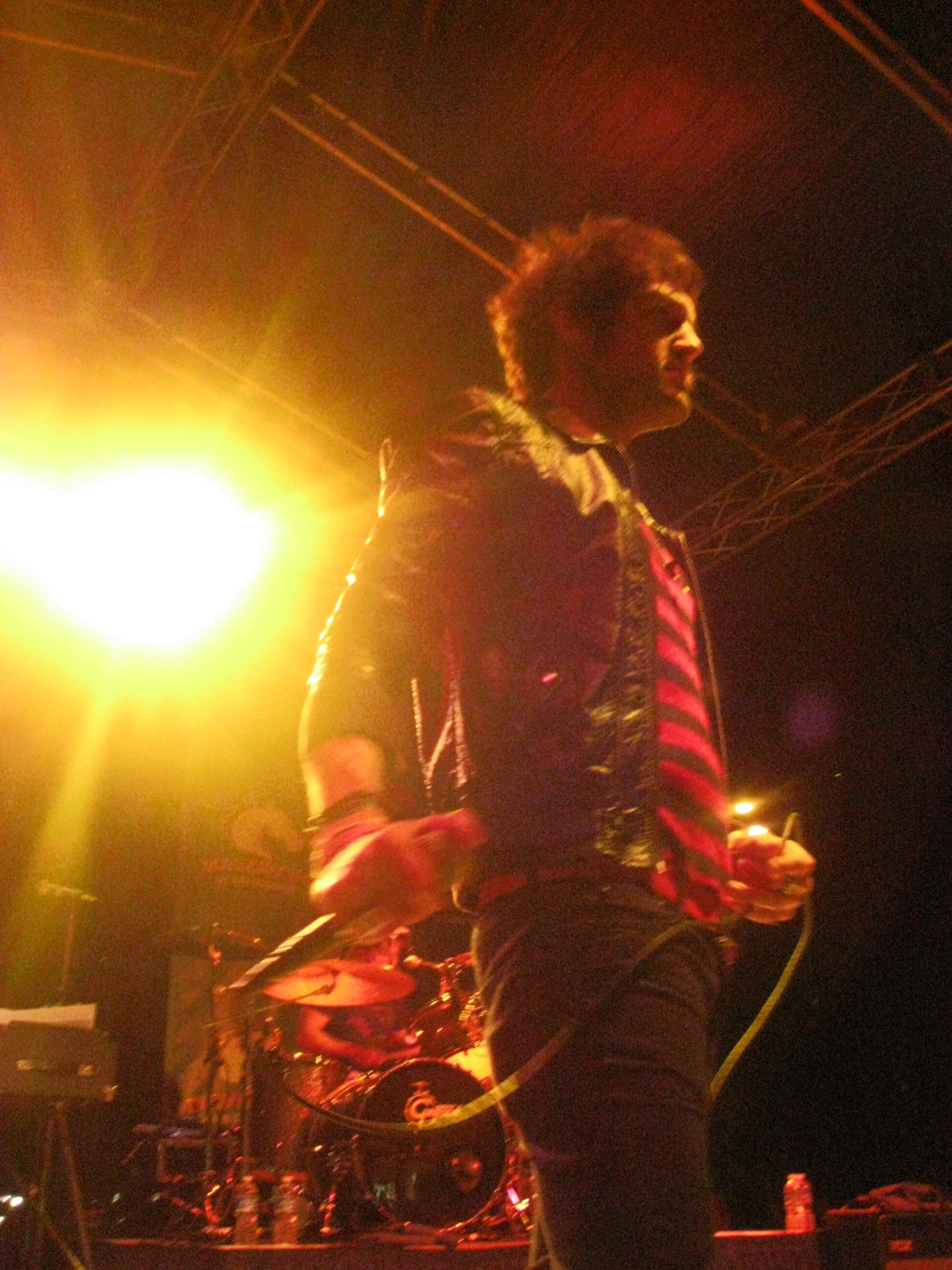
Endicott performing at the University of Texas at Arlington in 2010

At age 11 Endicott began playing guitar and at 12 switched to bass guitar. By age 13 he was an established bass player in the Washington, D.C. area, playing in numerous punk and harDCore bands, most notably Stain, with Geoff Turner of Gray Matter and Colin Sears of Dag Nasty. He has stated that his biggest influence as a bass player is Joe Lally of Fugazi, and he initially sought to emulate Lally's melodic style of playing.

While attending Vassar College in Poughkeepsie, New York, Endicott was classmates with future Bravery keyboardist John Conway. The two began a musical partnership, playing together in various projects in the Poughkeepsie area. After graduating with an A.B. in Psychology in 1999, Endicott and Conway moved to New York City, where their musical partnership continued. In 2003 he switched from bass guitar to vocals and began writing, recording and producing the music that would become the first Bravery album. Guitarist Michael Zakarin joined after answering an advert in a local paper, and brought with him bassist Mike Hindert, a classmate of his from Georgetown University in Washington, DC. Drummer Anthony Burulcich was living in Boston where he had studied percussion at Berklee College of Music. After the death of his sister, Burulcich moved back to his childhood home on Long Island New York to be with his family. On the day Burulcich was moving, while driving with his belongings in a U-Haul truck, Endicott called him. The Bravery went on to release their debut album in March 2005.

Endicott is a multi-instrumentalist playing guitar, bass, vocals, keyboards and programs electronic drums and synthesizers. Endicott has also co-directed and written a number of the Bravery's music videos, making his music video directing debut with the video for the Bravery's "Believe" in 2008. He is also credited as producer on the Bravery's debut album, as well as the "Moon" portion of their The Sun and the Moon Complete, described as an "alternate take" on their second release The Sun and the Moon. Endicott co-produced the Bravery's third studio album Stir The Blood.

While recording the Stir the Blood album, Endicott and producer John Hill co-wrote three songs with Shakira for her album She Wolf, including the single She Wolf and critically acclaimed song "Men In This Town". She Wolf and its Spanish version counterpart "Loba," had major commercial success worldwide.

Endicott, alongside Switch, Santigold, and John Hill also co-wrote the Christina Aguilera song "Monday Morning" for Aguilera's album Bionic.

Endicott also appears as an actor in the independent film Modern Romance.

Endicott was featured on the February 2005 cover of L'oumo Vogue.

Endicott was a feature model for the 2008 European Gap Campaign.

Endicott formed a new band with friends called The Mercy Beat. The band released a three-song EP in 2014 which he has described as experimental punk soul.

== Early life ==
=== Background and education ===
Endicott grew up in Brookmont, Maryland. He is an only child of William Endicott and Abigail Bingham Endicott, a vocalist and teacher.

Endicott attended Georgetown Day School before transferring to Phillips Academy in Andover, Massachusetts.

He is a great-great-great-grandson of Charles Lewis Tiffany.

He is a great-grandson of explorer and politician Hiram Bingham III.

He is the grandson of courageous American diplomat Hiram Bingham IV.

== Personal life ==
According to a November 2009 interview from the Spinner website, Endicott reported that he has synesthesia. In 2011, he relocated to Los Angeles, California.
