= Cleveland Bulldogs =

National Football League team in the 1920s

Cleveland Indians Cleveland Bulldogs

General information
- Founded: 1923
- Folded: 1927
- Stadium: Dunn Field
- Headquartered: Cleveland, Ohio, United States
- Colors: Red, white (Indians) Maroon, white (Bulldogs)

Personnel
- Owners: Sam Deutsch (1923–1925); Herb Brandt (1925–1927)
- Head coach: Cap Edwards (1923, 1925); Guy Chamberlin (1924); LeRoy Andrews (1927)

Team history
- Cleveland Indians (1923); Cleveland Bulldogs (1924–1927)

League / conference affiliations
- National Football League

The Cleveland Bulldogs were a team that played in Cleveland, Ohio in the National Football League. They were originally called the Indians in 1923, not to be confused with the Cleveland Indians NFL franchise in 1922. However, after team owner Samuel Deutsch purchased the Canton Bulldogs in 1924, he merged the Canton team with his Indians and renamed his franchise the Cleveland Bulldogs. The Canton Bulldogs remained a part of the team until 1925, when they were sold back to Canton. The Cleveland Bulldogs played in the NFL until 1928 when they were relocated to Detroit and became the Detroit Wolverines. The team was later incorporated into the New York Giants in 1929. The Cleveland Bulldogs won the 1924 NFL championship.

== History ==
=== Origins ===
Sam Deutsch, a Cleveland jeweler and boxing promoter who also owned a minor-league baseball team, bought an NFL franchise in 1923 and named the team the Indians. They played only seven games in that first season, but they had a shot at the championship, with a 3–0–3 record going into their final game against the Canton Bulldogs, who were also undefeated. The Indians were defeated 46–0 and posted a 3–1–3 league record, finishing fifth in the league, which comprised twenty teams at the time.

=== Purchase of the Canton Bulldogs ===
However, in August 1924, Deutsch, bought the defending NFL champions Canton Bulldogs for $2,500. The Bulldogs were experiencing heavy financial troubles at time and were sold to Deutsch without much of a struggle. Duestch combined the Cleveland Indians with the Canton Bulldogs, creating a new team, the Cleveland Bulldogs. Only seven of the Canton players actually joined the new Bulldogs; among them was player-coach Guy Chamberlin. The team played all of its home games at Dunn Field although Deutsch returned the team to Canton for the Thanksgiving game that season.

=== 1924 NFL champions and controversy ===
The Cleveland Bulldogs won the NFL championship that year with a 7–1–1 record. After winning their first six games, the Bulldogs lost to the Frankford Yellow Jackets and entered a virtual tie with the Chicago Bears for first place in the standings. The Bears played more games, but also had more ties, and their one loss had come in the season opener against the Bulldogs. The Bears attempted to have an after-season exhibition game counted toward the standings, however in 1924 this was against the NFL's rules. In July 1924, NFL owners had agreed on a proposal that the 1924 NFL season would begin on September 27 and end on November 30. Ironically, as it turned out, the proposal was made by Dutch Sternaman, co-owner of the Bears. On the official end date, Cleveland had a 7–1–1 record to Bears' 6–1–4. Ties didn't count at all in those days, so the Bulldogs were in first place with an .875 winning percentage to Chicago's .857. However, on December 7, 1924, the Bulldogs went to Chicago for a challenge match. The Bears won the game, 23–0, and claimed that they deserved the NFL championship; they cited as precedent the 1921 championship decision (which the Bears had won over the Buffalo All-Americans) that declared there was no such thing as an exhibition game. However, the issue wasn't settled until the owners' meeting in January, when the owners voted for Cleveland to take the title. The owners also decided at that meeting that the 1925 season would run through December 20.

=== Decline ===
In 1925, several Canton businessmen purchased the rights to the old Canton Bulldogs team from Deutsch for $3,000. The Bulldogs, now known as the Canton Bulldogs, played in Canton during the 1925 and 1926 seasons. However Deutsch continued to call his Cleveland franchise the Bulldogs. He also sold his Cleveland Indians half of the club to Herb Brandt in August 1925. That season the Cleveland Bulldogs fell to a dismal 5–8–1 record. The team performed poorly on the field and at the bank. By mid-November the organization was nearly bankrupt.

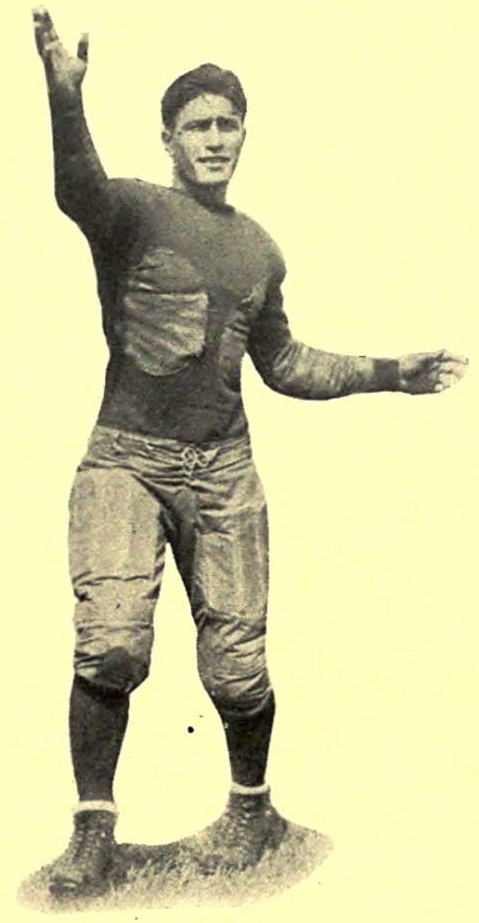
Benny Friedman

In 1926 Brandt received authority from the league to suspend operations for a year.

In 1927 by Sammy Deutsch made his reappearance, heading an ownership group which included Brandt, Max Rosenblum, Harold Gould, and Clinton Winfrey that took over and restarted the Cleveland Bulldogs franchise. The financially failing Kansas City Cowboys was purchased and provided the core of players for the new 1927 Bulldogs football club. Deutsch saw the team as a new business opportunity when he was able to procure the services of Cleveland-born Michigan passing legend Benny Friedman, whom he contracted of an astounding $18,000 for the 1927 season — the second highest compensation package in the league behind only Red Grange.

The team finished fourth in the National Football League in 1927, with an 8–4–1 record, but the joy was short-lived as the team relocated to become the Detroit Wolverines in 1928 to better cash in on Friedman's popularity.

=== Ties to the New York Giants ===
At the end of the season, Elliott Fisher purchased the Bulldogs and moved the team to Detroit to become the Wolverines. The 1928 Wolverines team consisted of 12 former Bulldogs players. Before the 1929 season, Tim Mara, owner of the New York Giants, purchased the entire Wolverines squad — with superstar passer Benny Friedman the primary object of his desire — and absorbed the team into his New York Giants franchise. Eight former Bulldogs players ended up playing for the Giants that season.

== Pro Football Hall of Famers ==
Cleveland Bulldogs/Indians Hall of Famers
Players
No.	Name	Position	Tenure	Inducted
—	Guy Chamberlin	End, HB	1924	1965
—	Benny Friedman	QB	1927	2005
—	William "Link" Lyman	T	1924	1964
—	Steve Owen	T/G	1925	1966

== Season-by-season ==
	Year	W	L	T	Finish	Coach
Indians	1923	3	1	3	5th	Cap Edwards
Bulldogs	1924	7	1	1	1st	Guy Chamberlin
Bulldogs	1925	5	8	1	12th	Cap Edwards
Bulldogs	1926	Suspended Operations				
Bulldogs	1927	8	4	1	4th	LeRoy Andrews

Achievements
Preceded by Canton Bulldogs; 1922, 1923	Cleveland Bulldogs; NFL Champions; 1924	Succeeded by Chicago Cardinals; 1925
