= History of Florida Gators football =

The history of Florida Gators football began in 1906, when the newly established "University of the State of Florida" fielded a football team during its first full academic year of existence. The school's name was shortened to the University of Florida in 1908, and the football team gained the nickname "Gators" in 1911. The program started small, usually playing six to eight games per season against small colleges and local athletic club teams in north Florida and south Georgia. The Orange and Blue developed early rivalries with the Stetson Hatters from nearby Deland and Mercer Bears from Macon. During the 1910s, Florida began playing a wider range of opponents from more established football programs across the southeastern United States and faced off against several future rivals - such as Georgia, Georgia Tech, South Carolina, and Auburn - for the first time.

Florida's football program first rose to national prominence in the 1920s, when coach Charlie Bachman's 1928 team led the nation in scoring and were kept from a perfect season and a possible invitation to play in the Rose Bowl by a season-ending one point loss to Tennessee in Knoxville. The success of the 1928 Gators inspired the school to replace primitive Fleming Field with a modern facility, and Florida Field opened in 1930. Despite their new home stadium, Gator teams did not find much success on the field through the 1930s and 1940s and had only four winning seasons in those decades. The period did see the beginning of a long annual series with the Miami Hurricanes and the cancelling of a football season when the university did not field a team in 1943 due to World War II

The program began an upward trend in the 1950s under coach Bob Woodruff, whose 1952 team was the first in school history to win a bowl game. The 1950s also saw the beginnings of rivalries with Florida State and LSU. Coach Ray Graves continued the success in the 1960s, with the Gators appearing in the AP top ten rankings for the first time. His 1966 team won the school's first Orange Bowl with quarterback Steve Spurrier, the school's first Heisman Trophy winner. Florida football slipped in the late 1970s under head coach Doug Dickey but was rejuvenated under coach Charley Pell, whose 1984 team won the school's first conference title. However, the championship was later stripped due to NCAA infractions committed under Pell, who was fired.

The 1990s brought unprecedented success to Florida football under head coach Steve Spurrier, who returned to lead his alma mater to many firsts. The 1991 team won the first official conference title, the first of six SEC titles under Spurrier. The Gators won their first national championship in 1996, and quarterback Danny Wuerffel became the first Heisman winner to be coached by a Heisman winner when he won the award in that year. Coach Urban Meyer led Florida to two additional national championships in 2006 and 2008 with quarterback Tim Tebow, who was the school's third Heisman Trophy winner. After a decline for several seasons after Meyer's departure in 2010, Florida returned to top-10 rankings and major bowl games in 2018 and 2019 under former coach Dan Mullen.

The Gators have competed in the Southeastern Conference since 1933, in its eastern division since 1992. Previously, Florida was a member of the Southern Intercollegiate Athletic Association (SIAA) from 1912 to 1921 and the Southern Conference (SoCon) from 1922 to 1932. There have been 25 head coaches for the team, starting with player-coach Pee Wee Forsythe in 1906.

== Overview ==
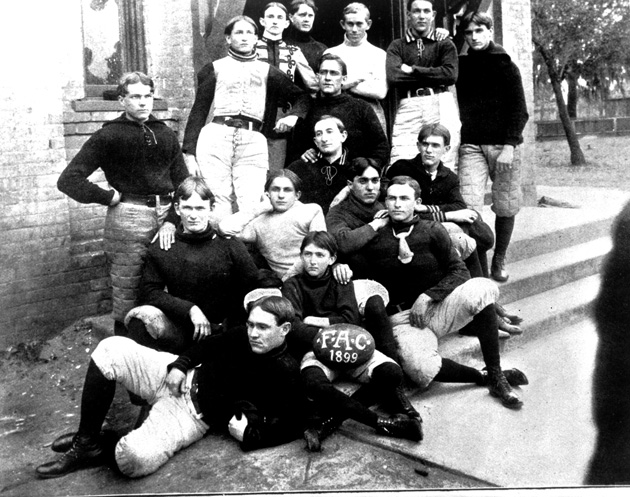
The 1899 FAC team, the first football team from any of UF's predecessor institutions.

=== Early history (1906–1959) ===
The modern University of Florida (UF) was created in 1905 when the Florida Legislature enacted the Buckman Act, which abolished all of the state's publicly supported institutions of higher learning and consolidated the academic programs of four in the new University of the State of Florida (a land-grant university for white men). (Note: The University of Florida would not accept its first black student until 1958, and would not become fully integrated racially until the 1960s.) The private Stetson College (now Stetson University) in DeLand was the first college to field a football team in the state, playing intramural games as early as 1894. Stetson, West Florida Seminary (later Florida State College, now Florida State University), and Florida Agricultural College (renamed the University of Florida at Lake City in 1903) had intramural football teams by the late 1890s or early 1900s. On November 22, 1901, Florida Agricultural College (FAC) and Stetson fielded teams for a match in Jacksonville as part of the State Fair, the first known intercollegiate football game in Florida. Stetson won 6–0, after a sure FAC score was blocked by a tree stump. The game sparked interest in football in the state; several other colleges organized intercollegiate games, including the East Florida Seminary (EFS) in Gainesville and Florida State College (FSC) in Tallahassee. The 1902 EFS team split games with Stetson and declared itself state champion. FAC's first coach was James M. Farr, an English professor from South Carolina, who led the team to victory over FSC in 1902. Two of UF's predecessor institutions, the University of Florida at Lake City (previously known as FAC) and EFS, faced each other in 1903. In 1904 the Lake City university's athletic club was reorganized, allowing the first major schedule for a Florida football team. Led by coach M. O. Bridges, the team was beaten easily by all its opponents (including out-of-state southern teams Alabama, Auburn, Georgia, and Georgia Tech). (Note: It was Mike Donahue's first season at Auburn and John Heisman's first season at Georgia Tech.) The Lake City team lost its final game to state champion FSC, coached by Jack "Pee Wee" Forsythe (Note: In 1903, Bridges at Cumberland and Forsythe at Clemson tied in the first organized Southern championship game. Forsythe was the only one on Heisman's Clemson teams to spend every minute of his career on the field.) (a former lineman for John Heisman at Clemson, who was later the Gators' first coach).

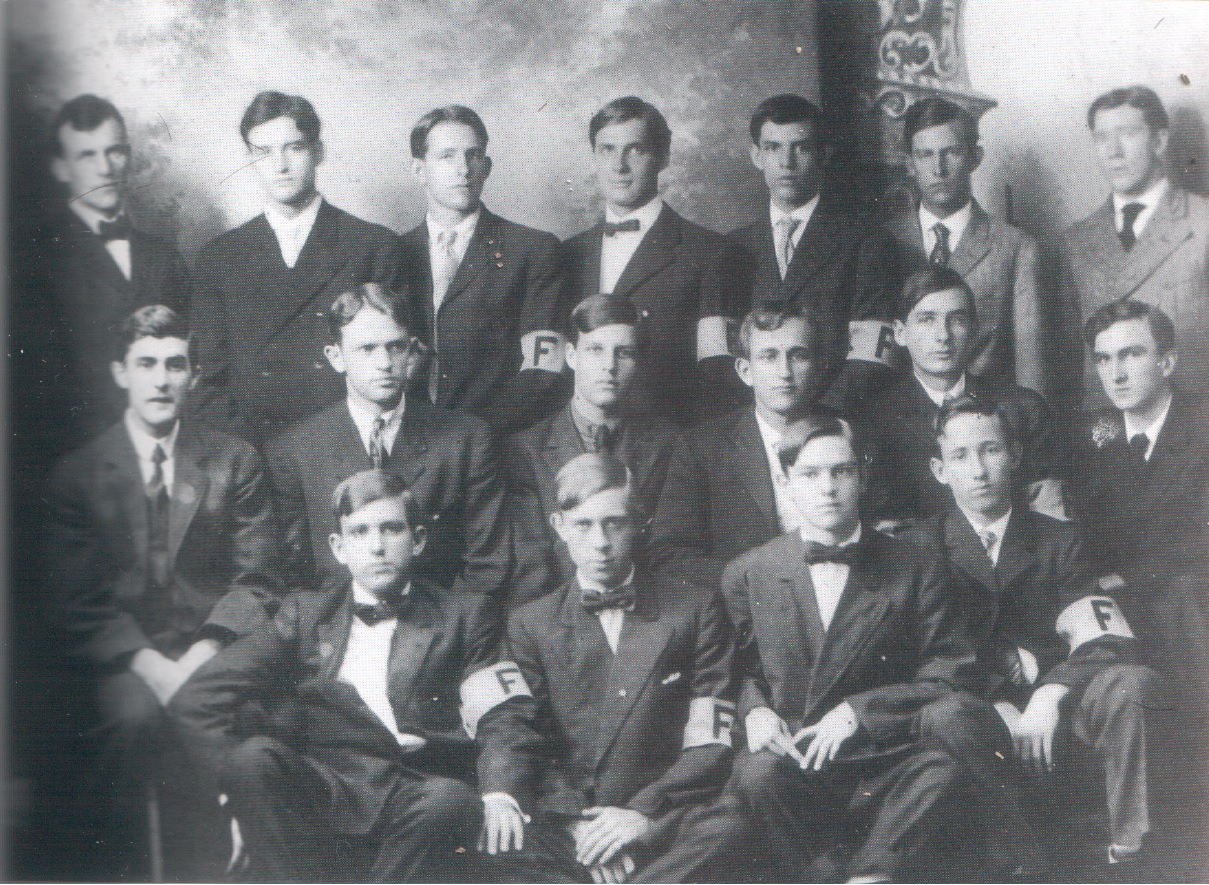
1907 UF football team; Forsythe is second from left in the center row, and Shands is bottom right.

The University of the State of Florida was in Lake City during its first year of existence (1905–06), while the first buildings of its new campus were constructed in Gainesville. The 1905 football season was a lost one, since university president Andrew Sledd ruled several players ineligible for academic reasons, forcing the cancellation of four out of five games. Just half of season's final contest was played; it was suspended when it was discovered that Florida's opponent, The Julian Landon Institute of Jacksonville, included a professional player. Florida's squad refused to take the field for the second half, and the game was suspended with Florida holding a 6-0 lead. The state university's football team began varsity play when the Gainesville campus opened in September 1906. Tackle William Wetmore "Gric" Gibbs is the only known member of the lost 1905 team who played for the new university's team in Gainesville. Football and baseball games and track meets were held at University Athletic Field, a grassy playing surface flanked by low bleachers on West University Avenue just north of the present stadium site. Permanent bleachers were installed in 1911, and the facility was renamed Fleming Field in honor of former Florida governor Francis P. Fleming. From 1911 to 1930, Florida's football squads posted a 49–7–1 record at Fleming Field. Because of the facility's limited capacity (about 5,000) and the relative inaccessibility of Gainesville in the early 20th century, most home games against top opponents were scheduled at larger venues in Jacksonville or Tampa; a handful were played in St. Petersburg and Miami. The school's first football coach was "Pee Wee" Forsythe, who led the Florida team for three winning seasons (including a 6–0 win over the Rollins College Tars in their first game). Forsythe used the Minnesota shift and also played on the team. The 1907 team was co-state champion with Stetson. (Note: The team picture is captioned "Champions of Florida '07".) Captain Roy Corbett was also the athletics editor of the Florida Pennant. The 1908 team defeated Stetson at home and played a scoreless tie on the road. William A. Shands, future state senator and namesake of Shands Hospital, played on the 1907 and 1908 teams. During these early years the Florida sports teams adopted their orange-and-blue team colors, reportedly a combination of school's predecessors: the blue and white of the FAC and the orange and black of the EFS.

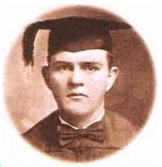
"Bo Gator" Storter

The new university's name was shortened to University of Florida in 1909, and George Pyle became the new head coach of its football team. The only blemishes that season were two games with Stetson: a loss on the road and a tie in Gainesville. (Note: 1909 is the last season in which Stetson claims a state championship.) Pyle had a 26–7–3 (.764) record with the Gators, the third-winningest coach in school history.

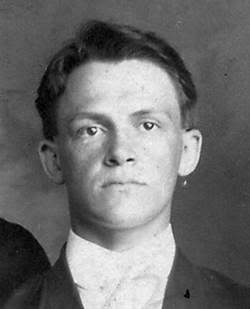
Dummy Taylor

The 1910s saw the newly-named Gators face many of their current rivals and regular opponents for the first time. The 1911 Gators, captained by center Neal "Bo Gator" Storter, tied the South Carolina Gamecocks and defeated the Citadel Bulldogs, Clemson and the College of Charleston (the self-proclaimed "champions of South Carolina"), finishing the season with a 5–0–1 record—the Gators' only undefeated football season. Earle "Dummy" Taylor, the only five-letter winner in team history, scored 49 of the season's 84 points (including a school-record eight field goals). Before the 1912 season Florida joined the Southern Intercollegiate Athletic Association (SIAA), the first southern athletics conference, and began the season by facing the Auburn Tigers for the first time. Florida posted a 5–2–1 record, including South Carolina's first defeat. After the season, the team played its first post-season game: the Bacardi Bowl in Havana, Cuba, a two-game series against two Cuban athletic clubs. (Note: The first game was played under the so-called "old rules" that existed before the American football reforms of 1906. In that game, Florida defeated the Vedado Tennis Club, 28–0. Five days later Florida played the Cuban Athletic Club of Havana, ostensibly under new rules.) During the first quarter of the second game Pyle and his team left, alleging that the Cuban team persisted in playing by the old rules, and the coach was arrested for violating a Cuban law prohibiting a game's suspension after money was charged. When his trial was delayed, Pyle and the Gators quickly left the island and he was branded a "fugitive from justice". The 1913 Gators began the season by defeating Southern College 144–0, the widest margin of victory in program history. The following week, the future SIAA champion Auburn Tigers beat the Gators 55–0. Florida finished the see-saw season with a 4–3 record, and Pyle left to become athletic director of West Virginia. In C. J. McCoy's first season, 1914, the team posted a much-improved 5–2 record. Unlike the previous season, the Gators played respectably against Auburn despite a 20–0 loss. The following year, McCoy also became the school's first basketball coach. The 1915 Gators played the Georgia Bulldogs and Tulane for the first time. Led by quarterback Rammy Ramsdell, UF's first scholarship athlete, Florida defeated Tulane 14–7. In pouring rain, "Rammy" scored the winning touchdown; he also scored a school-record four touchdowns against Mercer. McCoy felt he had the makings of a great Gators squad in 1916, compiling the most ambitious and difficult Gators football schedule to date. The team, captained by Rex Farrior, faced the Alabama Crimson Tide and Tennessee Volunteers for the first time. (Note: Rex Farrior became a name partner in a prominent Tampa law firm with 1910 quarterback Bob Shackleford, and remained one of the biggest boosters of the Gators sports program until his death.) The ill-fated 1916 team lost every game, faced multiple transfers, began the season with an injury to Ramsdell and ended it with one to Farrior. The Gators were shut out in all but the last game, a 14–3 loss to Indiana.

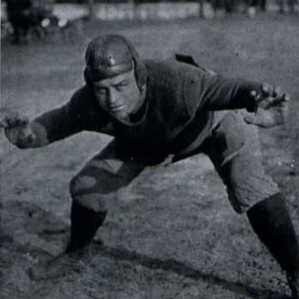
Tootie Perry

After the winless 1916 season the Gators hired Al Buser, a former All-American lineman for the Wisconsin Badgers, who promised to use a Midwestern, power-football style of play to revive the team. The 1917 season, however, was a 2–4 disappointment. During his three seasons as coach Buser compiled a 7–8 record, including a one-game 1918 season shortened by the influenza pandemic and World War I. Despite an improved record in 1919, the loss to Southern College was the first to a Florida opponent since Stetson in 1909 and was viewed as an unacceptable failure. In 1920 the Gators hired William G. Kline, former halfback for the Illinois Fighting Illini who had coached the Nebraska Cornhuskers, as head coach. Kline's first year saw an improved, 6–3 overall record but a 1–3 conference record. He upgraded the team for his second season, bringing in five players "from the University of Oklahoma and the western states." (Note: Namely end Ferdinand H. Duncan, halfback Ark Newton, tackle Arthur Doty, fullback Ray C. Dickson, and end Lloyd Hockenstadt.)

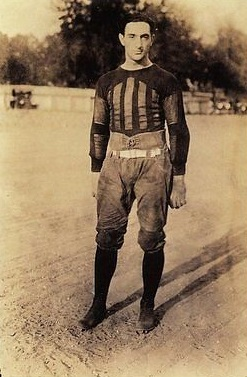
Ark Newton

The 1921 Gators went 6–3–2 overall and 4–1–2 in the conference, including a 9–2 defeat of Alabama (Florida's first). Georgia coach Herman Stegeman wrote in Spalding's Football Guide, "Florida, for the first time, had a strong team ... they combined a kicking game and a well-diversified offense to good advantage." The team was captained by center and guard Tootie Perry, Florida's first All-Southern selection. (Note: According to the F Club, the university's lettermen's association. Perry is also the namesake of the university's baseball stadium: Perry Field.) Perry played every minute of two seasons and "developed into a wizard at blocking punts"; UF's yearbook called him "Dixie's greatest guard." Perry later returned to Gainesville and was a fixture on the team's sidelines as a water boy, gaining national media notoriety as the "All-American Waterboy." The 1922 Gators had a 7–2 record. The team joined the Southern Conference (SoCon) after their regional rivals' departure from the SIAA in 1921, hiring former UVA athlete James L. White as athletic director. The season saw the Gators' first game against a traditional northeastern power. They played the Harvard Crimson on the road and were overwhelmed by Harvard substitutes, 24–0, before their largest crowd to date. (Note: En route, the team met then-President Warren Harding in Washington, D. C.) According to Spalding's Football Guide, the Gators were the best forward passing team in the country. Triple-threat halfback Ark Newton was selected All-Southern, and former Tampa Tribune sports editor Pete Norton called Newton "Florida's greatest football player." The 1920s and early 1930s saw the Gators' first inter-sectional victories and their first wins over several regular opponents. The 1923 and 1924 teams received national media coverage for the first time, and from 1923 to 1925 the Gators had the best three-year record in the first 20 years of Florida football. The 1928 team was one of the greatest in Gator history, at least until the 1960s. After the 1932 season, the Gators joined other major southern programs to establish the Southeastern Conference. James Van Fleet, a U.S. Army major and assistant coach under Kline, (Note: Van Fleet was an active duty U.S. Army officer who was also the senior officer of the university's Reserve Officer Training Corps (ROTC) program. As a regimental commander, he participated in the D-Day landings in Normandy, France during World War II, and later became a division and corps commander under General George Patton. During the Korean War, Van Fleet commanded the U.S. Eighth Army, following Douglas MacArthur and Matthew Ridgway. He retired as a four-star general in 1953.) coached the 1923 and 1924 teams to 6–1–2 and 6–2–2 records. Both teams lost to Army, Kline's alma mater, and tied with southern power Georgia Tech. In 1923's final game, on a rainy Thanksgiving Day, the Gators defeated Wallace Wade's heavily-favored Alabama 16–6. This, the Tide's only SoCon loss, gave the Gators their first national media coverage. (Note: Vanderbilt, where Wade had coach previously, thus won the conference. It is the most-recent conference title for Vanderbilt football.) Halfback Edgar Jones scored all the Gator points, and Newton kicked long punts. (Note: Newton, captain and tackle Robbie Robinson, and guard Goldy Goldstein were the first Gators to make the composite All-Southern team. Newton, Goldstein, and lineman Cy Williams were among the first Gators to play professional football, as teammates with the Newark Bears of the fledgling American Football League.)

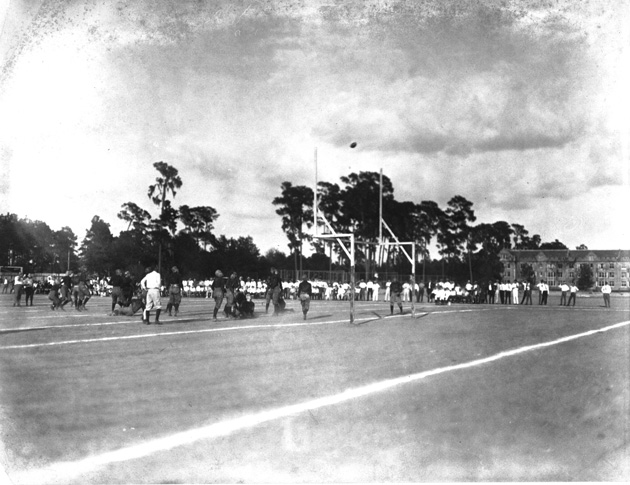
1924 field goal at Fleming Field

The 1924 loss to Army was close, 14–7, with Newton returning the second-half kickoff 102 yards for the Gator touchdown. Van Fleet swore biased officiating cost his Gators the victory. The week after the loss to Army, the team was defeated by Mercer 10–0 after about 5,000 miles of travel in three weeks. Florida was ranked second to conference champion Alabama.

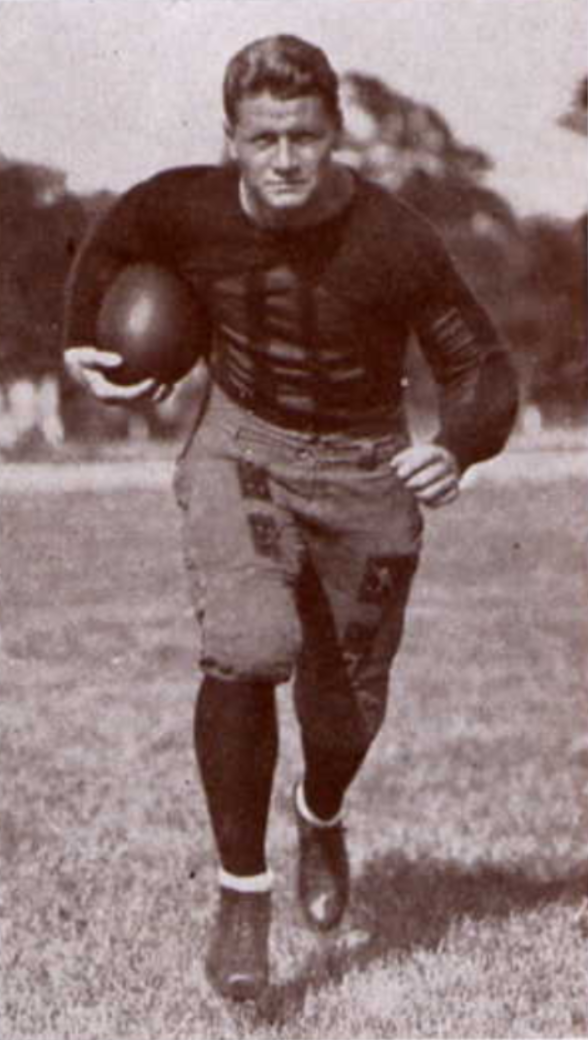
Edgar Jones

Led by new head coach Tom Sebring, a former football star for the Kansas State Wildcats, the 1925 Gators finished 8–2 (the first season with that many wins). Jones and Goldstein repeated as composite All-Southern. Jones scored a school-record 108 points that season, a record which stood for 44 years. (Note: Jones played a nine-game season, and the record stood until 1969, an eleven-game season.) The injury-plagued 1926 team posted a 2–6–2 record. The 1927 season seemed lost early with an upset by the Davidson Wildcats. A few days after the Davidson loss, captain Frank Oosterhoudt was declared ineligible. His replacement by unanimous vote was Bill Middlekauff, a fullback from previous years. Florida defeated Auburn for the first time, salvaging the season with a 7–3 record. The 1927 Gators won more conference games than they had in any two previous seasons combined. Sebring graduated from the university's College of Law and left the university in 1928, (Note: Sebring was a law student while serving as the Gators' coach. He later was appointed to the Florida Supreme Court.) after recruiting a talented team for his successor. Coach Charlie Bachman led the Gators to national recognition, taking over as head coach in 1928. Bachman, who coached Tom Sebring at Kansas State, attended Notre Dame from 1914 to 1916; an All-American guard for the Fighting Irish football team in 1916, he was a disciple of Knute Rockne. (Note: Just before Rockne died in a plane crash, he vacationed in Florida and spoke with Bachman.) Bachman's 1928 and 1929 Gator squads finished 8–1 and 8–2, respectively, the Gators' highest season-win totals for 32 years. Both seasons included the first defeats of the Georgia Bulldogs. Driven by the "Phantom Four" backfield of halfback Carl Brumbaugh, fullback Rainey Cawthon, quarterback Clyde Crabtree and halfback Royce Goodbread, the 1928 Gators led the nation in points scored with 336. The team also produced the Gators' first first-team All-American, end Dale Van Sickel, Florida's first member of the College Football Hall of Fame. Crabtree and Van Sickel were both unanimous All-Southern selections. Crabtree was ambidextrous and could throw passes with either hand or punt with either foot, while on the run or stationary, The 1928 team's sole loss was to Robert Neyland's Tennessee, 12–13, in the final game of the season. Thick mud hampered the Florida offense in a game in which coach Bachman had his players convinced they were playing for a shot at a Rose Bowl berth. The Florida players accused Tennessee of watering the field.

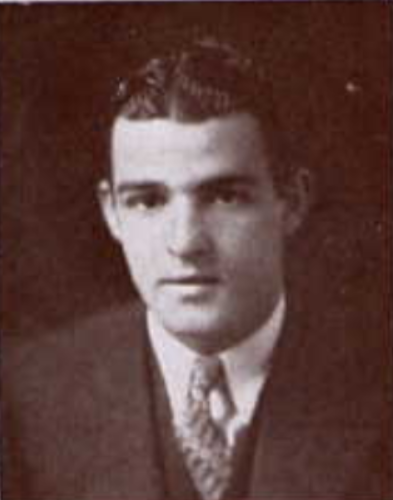
Dale Van Sickel

The 1929 Gators lost only to defending national champion Georgia Tech and Harvard. Their season ended in Miami with a 20–6 win over the Oregon Webfoots, a major inter-sectional victory. (Note: John McEwan coached Oregon, who had been Army's coach during the Van Fleet era.) Another inter-sectional victory followed in 1930, when Florida defeated Amos Stagg's Chicago Maroons 19–0. It was the Gators' first inter-sectional victory outside the South. Red Bethea rushed for a single-game school record of 218 yards, a record which stood for 55 years. The 1930 Gators also defeated Georgia Tech for the first time, 55–7, and played their first game at Florida Field (a 20–0 loss to national champion Alabama). Winning four of 18 games over the next two seasons (1931 and 1932), Bachman ended his tenure on a high note in his final game with a 12–2 inter-sectional upset of the UCLA Bruins. After the season, Bachman accepted an offer to become head coach of the Michigan State Spartans and was later inducted into the College Football Hall of Fame.

The 1930s and 1940s were difficult for the Gators. After posting a six-win season in 1934, Florida did not win more than five games in a season until 1952.

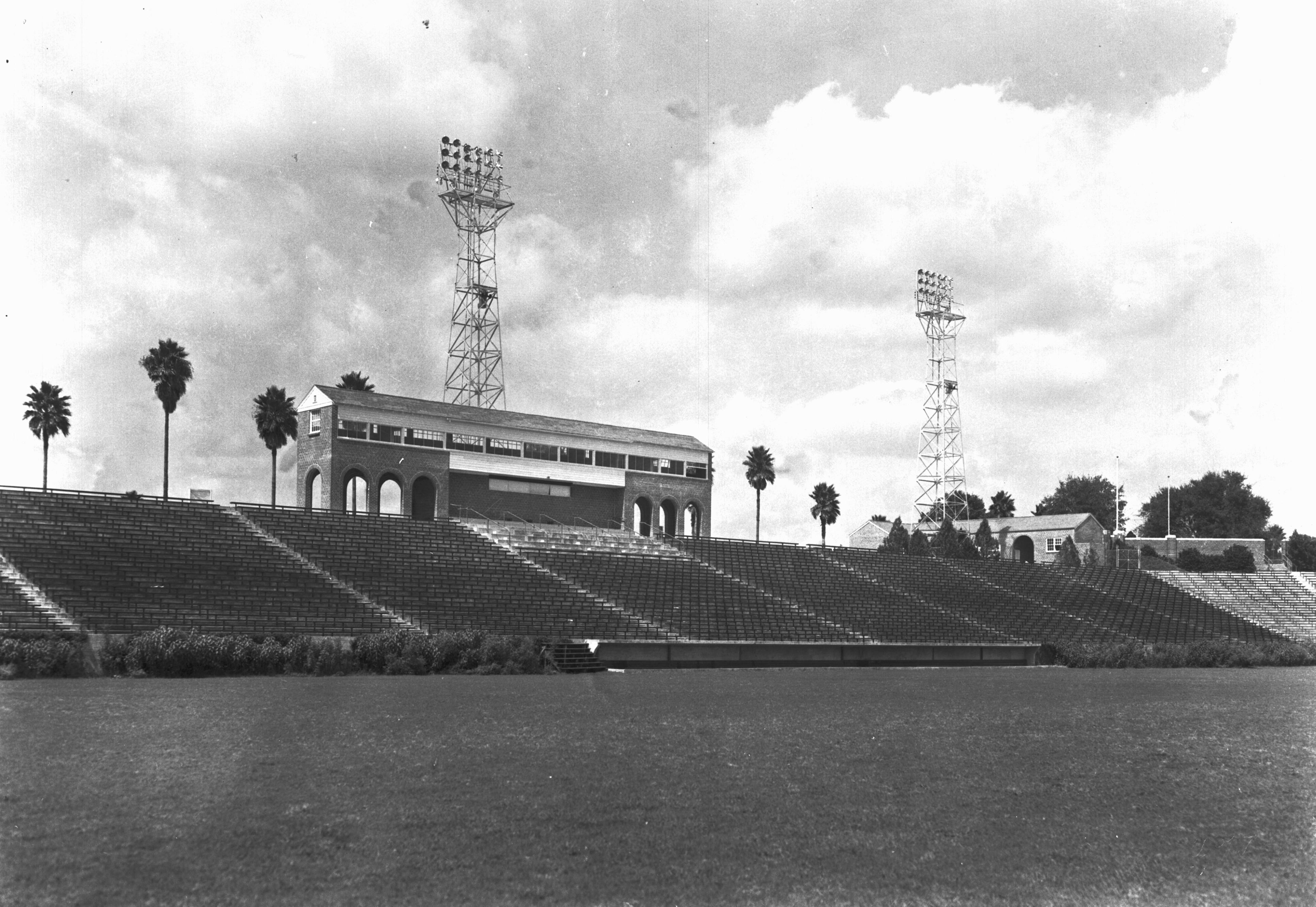
Florida Field during the 1930s

In 1928 John J. Tigert, a former Vanderbilt halfback, (Note: Tigert was All-Southern in 1903.) was appointed UF president and began a drive to build a larger stadium. By 1930 he was responsible for the construction of Florida Field, the Gators' permanent stadium. With state funding unavailable at the beginning of the Great Depression, the University Athletic Association raised funds and oversaw the project. To expedite construction, Tigert borrowed $10,000 and he and ten supporters of Florida's athletic program took out personal loans to raise the $118,000 required for the 22,800-seat facility. UF joined the new Southeastern Conference (SEC) in December 1932 with 12 other former members of the Southern Conference. Tigert, who was instrumental in the organization of the new conference, served four terms as SEC president. Gator alumnus Dutch Stanley, an end (opposite Van Sickel) on the 1928 team, replaced Bachman as coach in the first SEC football season in 1933. The 26-year-old Stanley brought an all-Gator-alumni coaching staff to the program, and the team had a two-year revival after two consecutive losing seasons under Bachman. Stanley's Gators posted 5–3–1 and 6–3–1 records in 1933 and 1934, faltering with a 3–7 season in 1935. The 1934 team won hard-fought, consecutive victories against Auburn and Georgia Tech. Dutch Stanley resigned as head coach in response to fan pressure after the 1935 season and became an assistant to his successor, Josh Cody. Cody was a former three-time All-American tackle for Dan McGugin's Vanderbilt football teams. After coaching Clemson to a 29–11–1 record from 1927 to 1930, he returned to his alma mater as basketball and assistant football coach under McGugin. Cody left Vanderbilt in 1936 and, with McGugin's recommendation, became athletic director and head football coach at Florida. In 1936, Cody's first season, Florida had one conference victory. Although the 1937 Gators were also lackluster, with a 4–7 finish, they defeated Georgia and produced the Gators' first first-team All-SEC selection: senior captain Walter "Tiger" Mayberry. Mayberry was a triple-threat back who set school records for interceptions in a season (6) and a career (11). (Note: Mayberry was also the first Gator ever chosen in the NFL draft, though he never played professionally.) According to one writer, "I have not seen a better back in six years than Mayberry ... Wallace Wade, Bernie Moore, and Harry Mehre all told me that Mayberry was the best back in the South, one of the best they have seen in half a dozen years and certainly the best that Florida has produced in a decade." The 1938 Gators finished seventh of 13 SEC teams, Cody's best finish in the conference. The season included the first meeting between the Gators and their in-state rival Miami Hurricanes. The team also lost at home to Temple 20–12 in the last game Pop Warner ever coached.

Fergie Ferguson

Cody's finest moment as the Gators' head coach may have been the team's 7–0 upset of Frank Leahy's undefeated, second-ranked Boston College Eagles in 1939. Sophomore end Fergie Ferguson was the Gators' defensive star in the game. Florida failed to win a conference game in 1939, and Cody left Gainesville with a 17–24–2 win–loss–tie record in four seasons to become an assistant coach at Temple University.

Tom Lieb, who had most recently posted a winning record at Loyola, replaced Cody as head coach in 1940. Lieb, a former Notre Dame All-American, became Knute Rockne's top assistant in South Bend. He assisted during the Fighting Irish 1924 national-championship season (with the Four Horsemen), and was the de facto head coach during Notre Dame's 1929 national-championship season when Rockne was ill. Despite fans' early hopes for a return to a Bachman-like "Notre Dame system" and Lieb's previous success, the Gators posted a 20–26–1 record in five seasons. Lieb's best season was probably his first, in 1940, when the Gators defeated Georgia, Georgia Tech and Miami. The 1941 season was disappointing, except for a 14–0 road upset of Miami and a hard-fought 14–7 homecoming victory against Georgia Tech. Georgia running back Frank Sinkwich played with a broken jaw as the Bulldogs romped over the Gators, 19–3. However, Florida honored its second first-team All-SEC selection: senior end Fergie Ferguson, who led the team in points scored (36) and minutes played (420). Ferguson also received honorable mention All-America honors from Grantland Rice in Collier's magazine. The Fergie Ferguson Award is named in his honor. He caught both touchdowns in the win against Miami; according to the Miami Herald, the score was "Forrest Ferguson 14; University of Miami 0."

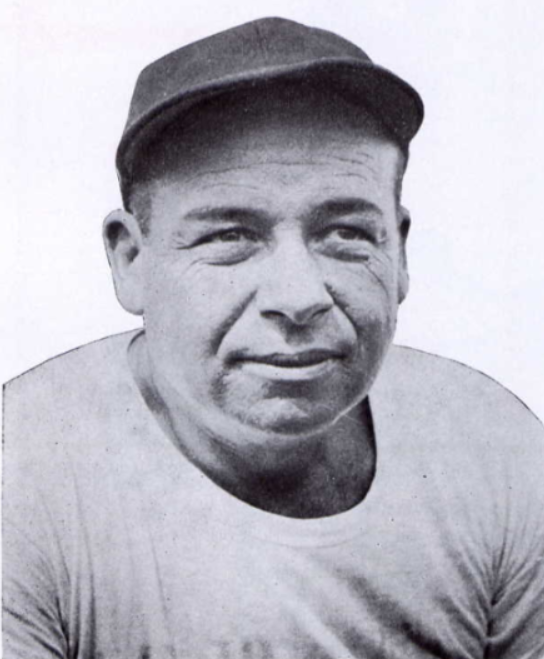
Coach Bear Wolf of Florida's "golden era"

During the World War II years of 1942 to 1945, most of the university's able-bodied students withdrew and enlisted in the U.S. military. The 1942 Gators lost 75–0 to national champion Georgia; according to Dan Magill, it was the most memorable win in Georgia history. Georgia's backfield included Charley Trippi and Heisman Trophy winner Frank Sinkwich. (Note: Gator Paul Duhart was drafted second overall, after Trippi, in the 1945 NFL draft, the highest a Gator has ever been taken.) Florida did not field a team in 1943 due to the lack of available players, for the first and only autumn since the modern University of Florida opened its Gainesville campus in 1906. Florida was one of seven Southeastern Conference schools that did not field a squad during the 1943 season. The 1945 backfield was made up entirely of freshmen. During the war, Tiger Mayberry's fighter plane was shot down over the Pacific and he died in a Japanese prisoner-of-war camp; Fergie Ferguson was seriously wounded leading an infantry assault during the D-Day landings in France and died from complications of his injuries ten years later.

Returning war veterans arrived on the Gainesville campus in the fall of 1946. Dutch Stanley returned from Duke as dean of the college of physical education and hired Bear Wolf, prewar head coach of North Carolina, to replace Lieb. The Gator football program slid further under Wolf, posting a 13–24–2 record in four losing seasons (the low point of the Gator football program), and is ironically known as the "golden era". The first season for Wolf was poor; the 1946 Gators finished with a 0–9 record, the worst in school history. Their upset of the 18th-ranked NC State Wolfpack in 1947 broke a 13-game postwar losing streak. Wolf failed to use the two-platoon system and used the by-then dated double-wing, only converting to the T-formation by 1948. Several members of the Florida Board of Control and a number of Florida alumni called for Wolf to step down after the 1948 season, but player-led support rallies led to a one-year contract extension. Gator running back Chuck Hunsinger was first-team All-SEC in 1948 and 1949, rushing for a career 2,017 yards. In 1949, Hunsinger ran for 174 yards and three touchdowns in a 28–7 victory over Georgia. Jimmy Kynes was a defensive standout, the last Gator player to play an entire 60-minute game. The Gators lost their last three games, and Wolf's contract was not renewed. Iconic cheerleader Mr. Two Bits attended his first home game during the 1949 season, beginning his 60-year tradition of leading Gator fans in the "two bits" cheer at Florida Field.

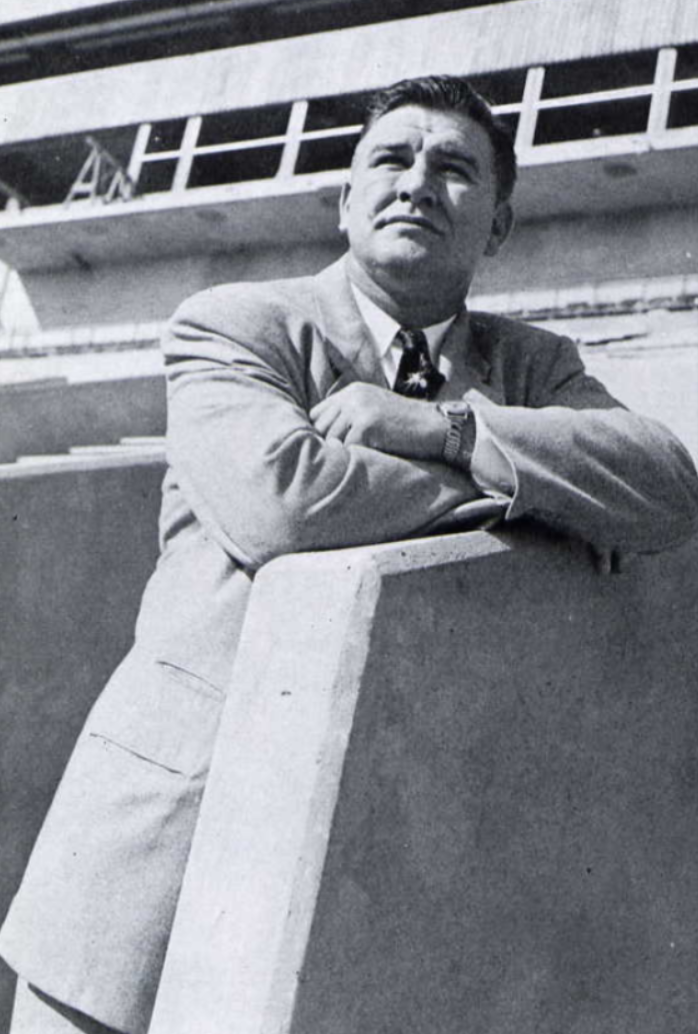
Bob Woodruff

The Gators improved under coach Bob Woodruff during the 1950s. His ten-year tenure was notable for a 6–4 record against Georgia, four top-twenty final AP Poll rankings, and only two losing seasons. Woodruff, who came to Florida from Baylor after a lengthy search, was best known as an assistant on Doc Blanchard's Army teams. In order to induce Woodruff to coach the Florida team, the Florida Board of Control offered him a seven-year guaranteed contract at $17,000 per year; an annual salary $5,000 more than that of University of Florida President J. Hillis Miller. As a former Tennessee football player and disciple of Volunteers coach Robert Neyland, he emphasized defense, field position and the kicking game over an open offense; however, during Woodruff's first season in 1950 the Gator offense posted record numbers. Haywood Sullivan was the first sophomore in SEC history to throw for more than 1,000 yards in a season. He set nine then-school records. These included average (50.3%), yardage (1,170), and average for a single game (7 for 7 against Kentucky). With victories over Auburn and Vanderbilt, it was the Gators' first season since 1940 with two SEC victories. The 1951 Gators again won two SEC games (against Vanderbilt and Alabama in Tuscaloosa), in addition to inter-sectional victories against the Wyoming Cowboys (13–0) and Loyola Lions (40–7). The Gators peaked under Woodruff during the 1952 season, posting an 8–3 record and a number-15 AP Poll ranking. The Gators shut out Georgia 33–0 (their largest victory against the Bulldogs for almost forty years), and national champion Georgia Tech needed a last-second field goal to defeat Florida. The Gators received their first bowl-game invitation, defeating the Tulsa Golden Hurricane 14–13 in the Gator Bowl on New Year's Day. The team produced Florida's second first-team All-American: the walk-on former Army paratrooper Charlie LaPradd, the Gators' lightest tackle and one of their two captains. (Note: LaPradd became a football coach at FSU and then president of St. John's River Community College in Palatka.) Woodruff never equaled the success of his 1952 team, in part due to a 1953 NCAA rule change forbidding unlimited substitutions. (Note: The NCAA embraced a set of new rules requiring the use of the one-platoon system, primarily due to financial reasons. The system allowed only one player to be substituted between plays, which effectively put an end to the use of separate specialized units. Tennessee's coach Neyland praised the change as the end of "chickenshit football") The 1953 season was a year of rebuilding and backsliding after LaPradd's graduation. The 1954 Gators' record SEC win–loss record of 5–2, including a win against Georgia Tech and their first victory against Tennessee, was countered by five overall losses. The 1955 team played their only eight-game SEC schedule before the 1990s. In 1956, although the Gators produced first-team All-American guard John Barrow and began the season with a 6–1–1 record, they lost the last two games to Georgia Tech and Miami. The 1957 team upset Billy Cannon and the 10th-ranked LSU Tigers, finishing with a number-17 AP ranking. In 1958, Florida produced first-team All-American tackle Vel Heckman and ranked 14th despite a 6–4–1 record. The season included a 12–9 upset of Miami and the first win against new in-state rival Florida State Seminoles (FSU). In a 5–6 loss to fourth-ranked Auburn, an injury to a Florida tackles led Woodruff to employ the unorthodox strategy of shifting Heckman between right and left tackle. Bill Kastelz, the sports editor of the Jacksonville Times-Union, wrote: "Big, fast and tough, he outshone all of Auburn's great linemen." According to Auburn coach Shug Jordan, "There should be a law to prevent things like that. We were supposed to run plays where Heckman wasn't, and he's there now." Woodruff finished his Gator career with a 53–42–6 record. Despite his success, UF president J. Wayne Reitz pressured him to resign after 1959. Woodruff returned to his alma mater, Tennessee, in 1963 and was the school's athletic director for many years.

=== Ray Graves era (1960–1969) ===
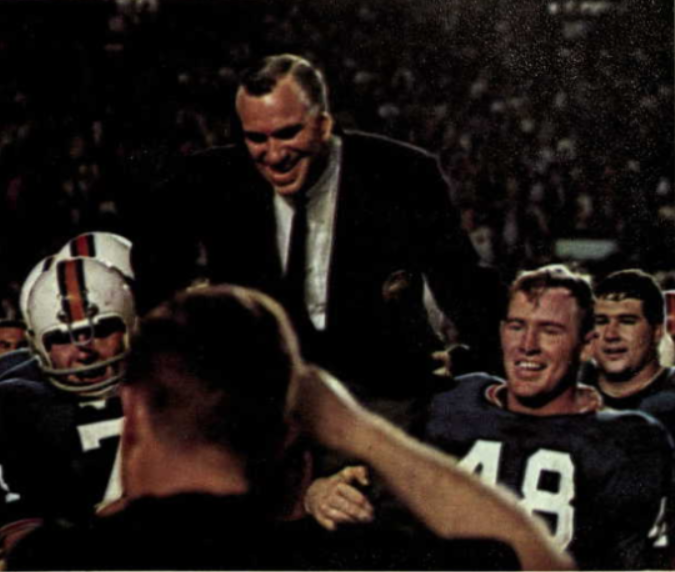
Graves is carried from the field by his players after the 1967 Orange Bowl victory.

Florida attained its first consistent success in the 1960s, when Ray Graves coached the team to three nine-win seasons and a total of 70 victories (a Florida record for 27 years). (Note: Steve Spurrier led the Gators to seventy-three wins from 1990 to 1996, and ultimately won a total of 122 games as the Gators' head coach from 1990 to 2001.) Graves, former assistant to Tennessee coach Robert Neyland and a longtime Georgia Tech defensive assistant for coach Bobby Dodd, led the Gators to a series of firsts (including their first nine-win season, in 1960). Under him, the Gators produced three times the number of first-team All-Americans during the 1960s as they had in their previous 54 seasons. (Note: Coach Ray Graves' Gators football teams of the 1960s produced fifteen first-team All-Americans. From 1906 to 1959, the Gators only had five players who received first-team All-American honors.) At this time, Robert Cade and other UF medical researchers developed Gatorade and tested it on the football team in the consistent heat and humidity in which they played. Gatorade was a success, and Florida developed a reputation as a "second-half team". Among the 1960 season's highlights was the Gators' 18–17 upset of Dodd's tenth-ranked Yellow Jackets and a hard-fought 13–12 victory over the 12th-ranked Baylor Bears in the Gator Bowl on New Year's Eve. The 1961 team, attempting LSU coach Paul Dietzel's three-platoon system, finished with a 4–5–1 record. The Gators won the Gator Bowl again in 1962, upsetting ninth-ranked Penn State. They wore the Confederate Battle Flag on the side of their helmets to pump up the southern team facing a favored northern school. Florida began its 1963 season with a 1–1–1 record. The season highlight followed: a 10–6 upset of the Joe Namath-quarterbacked, third-ranked Crimson Tide in Tuscaloosa, one of only two home losses in Denny Stadium during Bear Bryant's 25 years at Alabama. Before the game, Florida's defensive coordinator Gene Ellenson challenged his shaky team's manhood and they rose to the occasion. The Gators won their last three games—against Georgia (21–14), Miami (27–21) and FSU (7–0)—to finish with a 6–3–1 record.

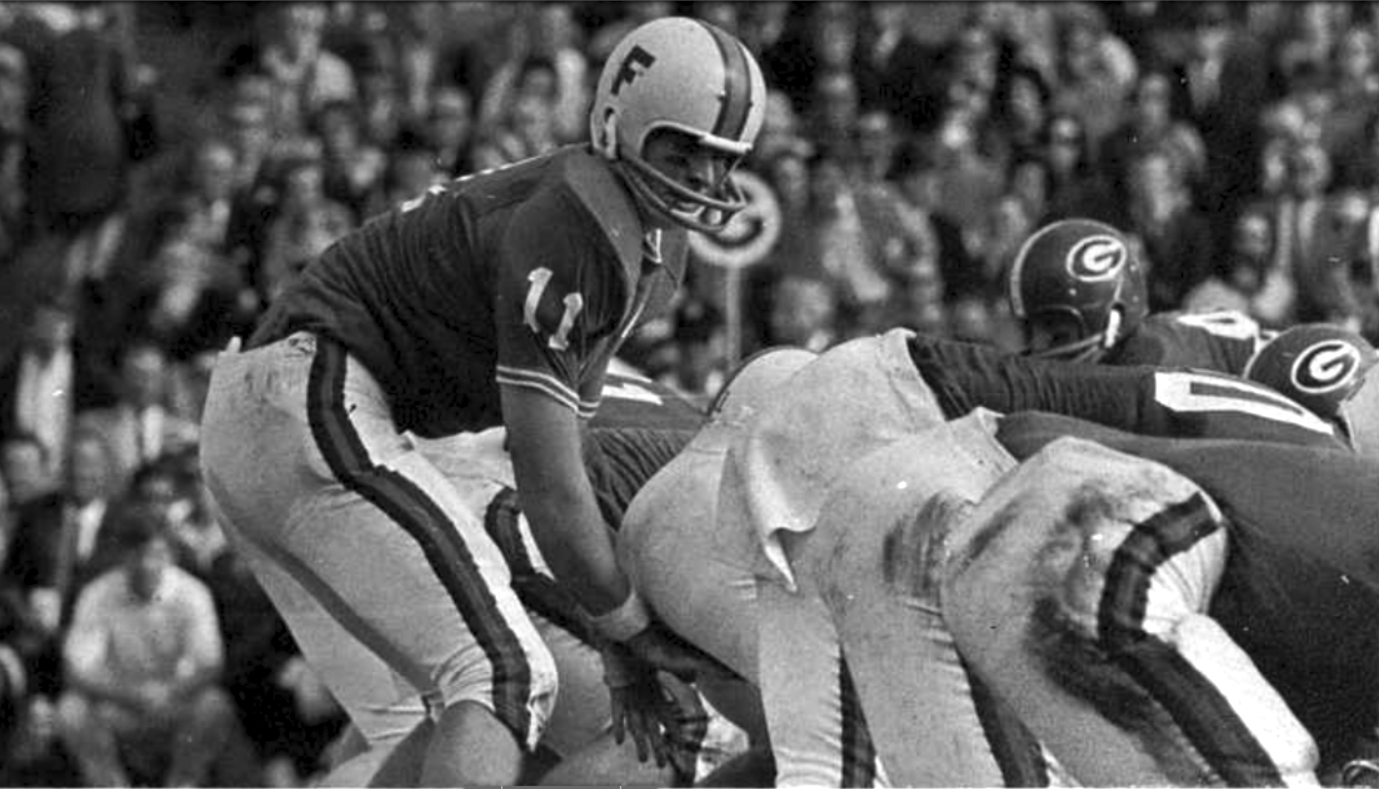
Quarterback Steve Spurrier (11) against Georgia in 1966

The 1964 team, with sophomore quarterback Steve Spurrier and first-team All-American running back Larry Dupree, posted a 7–3 record and tied for second place in the SEC. They defeated Sugar Bowl bound, seventh-ranked LSU 20–6 in a game postponed until weeks after the season ended due to Hurricane Hilda. The 1965 team was ranked 12th in the Coaches Poll and lost a close game to the Missouri Tigers in the Sugar Bowl, the Gators' first major-bowl appearance. Spurrier was the game's most valuable player, the only MVP from a losing team in Sugar Bowl history.

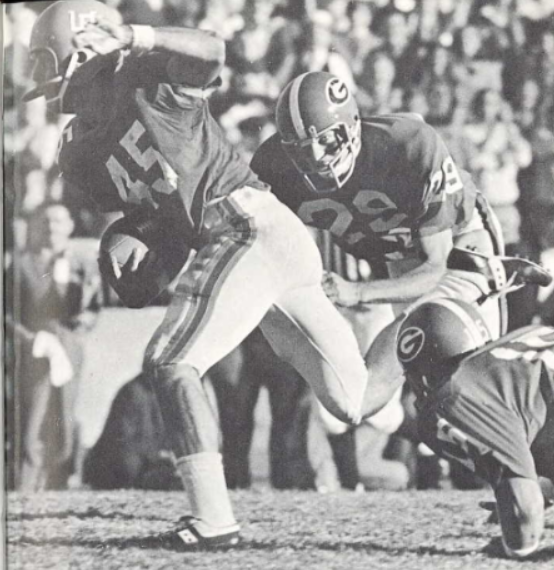
Receiver Carlos Alvarez (45) against Georgia, 1970

Graves fielded one of his best teams in 1966, finishing with a 9–2 record and defeating Georgia Tech 27–12 in the Orange Bowl (Florida's first major-bowl victory). Halfback Larry Smith ran 94 yards for a touchdown while struggling to keep his pants up. His 187 yards rushing resulted in him being named the game's "Outstanding Player." Spurrier won the Heisman Trophy and was a unanimous All-American after waving off Florida's kicker and booting a 40-yard field goal for a 30–27 victory against Auburn. The 1967 Gators upset Georgia, which the 1966 team had not done. End Richard Trapp sparked a Florida comeback with a 57-yard touchdown catch-and-run. The Gators kicked a field goal with 34 seconds left to upset the Bulldogs, 17–16. Graves signed Leonard George and Willie Jackson Sr., the Gators' first two black football players, on December 17 and 18, 1968. Since the NCAA did not permit freshmen to play on varsity teams, Jackson became the first black player (and starter) for the Gators during the 1970 season and Florida integrated black players into the team. Graves' 1969 season (his last) is remembered for the "Super Sophs", which included quarterback John Reaves, All-American wide receiver Carlos Alvarez, and tailback Tommy Durrance's 110-point season scoring record. The 1969 Gators also posted an alltime-best 9–1–1 record and a 14–13 Gator Bowl upset of SEC champion Tennessee. The Gator Bowl was dominated by a Gator defense led by linebacker Mike Kelley (the game's MVP) and All-Americans: defensive back Steve Tannen and defensive end Jack Youngblood. After the game, Graves resigned as head coach (with a 70–31–4 record) but continued as Florida's athletic director until 1979.

=== Doug Dickey era (1970–1978) ===
Florida alumnus and former quarterback Doug Dickey took over as head coach in 1970, agreeing to a five-year contract. Dickey was the head coach of Tennessee for the previous six seasons, winning two SEC championships and taking the Volunteers to five bowl games.

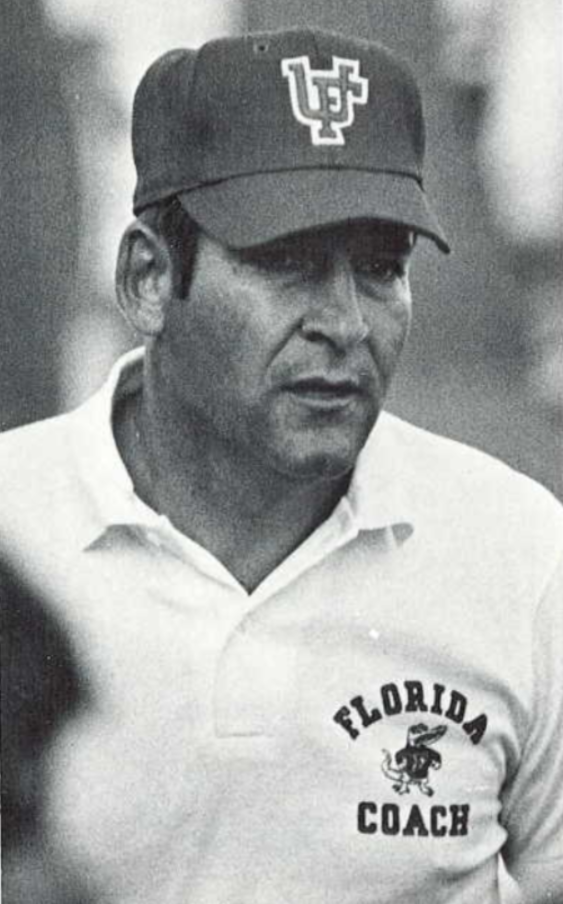
Doug Dickey

A colorful moment during the Dickey era was a play known as the "Florida Flop" or the "Gator Flop." In the last game of the 1971 regular season, the Gators led Miami 45–8 with less than two minutes left. Victory was assured, and Florida senior quarterback John Reaves needed 14 yards to break Jim Plunkett's NCAA record for career passing yardage; Miami had the ball. Several of Florida's defensive players convinced Dickey that the only way for Reaves to set the mark would be for Miami to score quickly. Dickey refused twice before he agreed. With the Hurricanes near the Florida end zone, the entire Gator defense except one player fell to the ground and allowed Miami to score a touchdown. Florida then got the ball back, and Reaves completed a 15-yard pass to Carlos Alvarez for the record. After the final whistle, jubilant Florida players jumped into a tank behind the Orange Bowl end zone usually used by the Miami Dolphins' mascot, "Flipper" and angry Miami coach Fran Curci refused to shake hands with Dickey.

Beginning in 1972, for the first time since 1921, freshmen were permitted to play on southeastern teams. Dickey also brought in 12 African-American players. The 1972 and 1973 Gators were spearheaded by running back Nat Moore. Dickey's team peaked in 1974 and 1975. The 1974 Gators posted an 8–4 record (after a 7–1 start) and a Sugar Bowl appearance, a 13–10 loss. Dickey employed the wishbone offense for the first season in the Gators' history. The 1975 Gators had a 9–3 record. Sammy Green was a consensus All-American and Jimmy DuBose was SEC Player of the Year. The 1976 and 1977 teams featured All-American wide receiver Wes Chandler, widely considered one of Florida's best all-around football players and voted into the College Football Hall of Fame in 2015. The 1976 season opened with a 24–21 loss to North Carolina before Florida won six straight games. In the win against Auburn Chandler scored a touchdown on a short pass, running 64 yards through the Auburn defense. When Chandler ran out of the end zone, Auburn's mascot (the War Eagle) jumped off its perch and began clawing his shoulder pads. In the next game, against Georgia game, the Gators led 27–13 at halftime and an upset seemed possible. After Georgia scored midway through the third period, Dickey gambled on fourth down with one yard to go; his play failed. Florida never recovered, and Georgia won 41–27; the play became known as "Fourth and Dumb." The Gators had a 6–4–1 season in 1977, and Chandler was 10th in balloting for the Heisman Trophy. He resigned after a 4–7 season in 1978; unable to duplicate his success at Tennessee, the coach had a 58–43–2 record in nine seasons with the Gators.

=== Charley Pell era (1979–1984) ===
Charley Pell was hired as Florida's new head coach for the 1979 season. Pell had coached at Clemson, where he led the Tigers to a 10–1 record and an Atlantic Coast Conference (ACC) championship in 1978. Although he helped build Florida's football program, a public scandal and NCAA sanctions crippled it after his departure.

UF president Marshall Criser and Galen Hall celebrating the 1984 season

The 1979 season was a 0–10–1 disaster, but Pell's Gators improved after he hired offensive coach Mike Shanahan. Quarterbacks Bob Hewko and Wayne Peace led the team to an NCAA-record turnaround with an 8–3 season in 1980. Despite Georgia's consensus All-American back Herschel Walker, Florida nearly defeated the national-champion Bulldogs for what would have been its first SEC championship until Georgia executed one of the most famous plays in college-football history. The Bulldogs were trailing 21–20 with time running out, facing a third down and long yardage from their seven-yard line. After scrambling around his end zone, Georgia quarterback Buck Belue found wide receiver Lindsay Scott open in the middle of the field. Scott outran everyone else down the sideline, scoring the game-winning touchdown with seconds left. Georgia radio announcer Larry Munson's call of the play gave the game its nickname: "Run Lindsay Run." The Gators ended their season with a 35–20 victory against the Maryland Terrapins in the Tangerine Bowl, the first time a winless team received a bowl invitation the following season. Pell's teams built on that success, leading Florida to seven wins in 1981, eight wins in 1982 and nine wins in 1983. The 1982 team upset 10th-ranked USC, 17–9, in a nationally-televised game which helped return Florida football to national prominence. The 1983 team finished sixth in the final AP Poll, the highest final ranking in school history to date. The 1982 and 1983 teams included consensus All-American linebacker Wilber Marshall.

Before the 1990s, Florida's 1984 team was considered by many the best in school history. The Gators won their first SEC championship, completing an undefeated conference schedule for the first time in school history. Florida sealed its 27–0 victory against Georgia when SEC Player of the Year, redshirt freshman quarterback Kerwin Bell, dropped back into his own end zone and threw a long pass to receiver Ricky Nattiel (who ran 96 yards for a touchdown). Until then, Vanderbilt was the only other charter SEC member to have never won a conference title. The Gator offense was formidable behind a line (the "Great Wall of Florida") which paved the way for John L. Williams and Neal Anderson to run the ball. The line included Phil Bromley, Lomas Brown, Billy Hinson, Crawford Ker, Scott Trimble and Jeff Zimmerman. Several polls ranked the Gators as the best team in the nation. Pell did not finish the 1984 season with the team. Due to reports of serious recruiting and other NCAA rule violations by the coach and his staff, he announced in August 1984 that he would retire at the end of the season. When school officials received a list of 107 major infractions from the NCAA in mid-September, however, university president Marshall Criser fired Pell.

=== Galen Hall era (1984–1989) ===
Offensive coordinator Galen Hall, who had just arrived for the 1984 season and was not involved with the rule violations, was named interim head coach before the season's fourth game. Hall rallied his players after a 1–1–1 start to win eight consecutive games for a 9–1–1 record (including an undefeated 5–0–1 SEC record), all but ensuring that he would become the permanent coach after the season. The SEC banned the Gators from the Sugar Bowl, and LSU went in their place. Two weeks after the end of the season, the NCAA imposed two years of probation (a third year was suspended) and banned the Gators from bowl games and live television in 1985 and 1986. The most damaging sanctions in the long run were a limit of 20 new scholarships in 1985 and 1986 and a reduction to 85 total scholarships in 1985 and 75 in 1986. In the spring of 1985, the SEC university presidents voted 6–4 to vacate the Gators' 1984 SEC championship. Florida posted another 9–1–1 record in 1985, Hall's first full season as head coach, and was briefly ranked number one in the AP Poll for the first time in school history. The Gators finished the season atop the SEC standings, but were ineligible for the conference title. Although he never had a losing season, Hall's subsequent teams did not match his early success when the scholarship losses for Pell's violations took their full effect; his first two recruiting classes had only 25 players. The unranked 1986 Gators upset the Auburn Tigers, 18–17. Kerwin Bell led the Gators to overcome a 17–0 fourth-quarter deficit in a game still considered one of the most dramatic in Florida Field history.

The greatest player during Hall's tenure was All-American running back Emmitt Smith, who set school and conference rushing records from 1987 to 1989. (Note: Including Red Bethea's single-game yardage record in a 23–14 upset of Alabama in 1987.) The Gators began the 1988 season with a 5–0 record, and were ranked as high as 14th. During an October game against the Memphis State Tigers, Smith injured his knee and was unable to play for a month. Florida lost that game and the next three, with the Gator offense unable to score a touchdown while Smith was sidelined. Another NCAA infraction scandal would end Hall's tenure at Florida. In 1989, he admitted supplementing his assistant coaches' salaries with his own funds and was accused of paying child support-related legal expenses for one of his players, a charge he denied. Interim university president Robert A. Bryan demanded Hall's resignation five games into the 1989 season. Defensive coordinator Gary Darnell was interim head coach for the rest of the season. The NCAA imposed two years' probation and banned the Gators from bowl consideration in 1990. The NCAA deemed Hall's actions egregious enough that it would have banned the Gators from live television in 1990 if he had remained as coach.

=== Steve Spurrier era (1990–2001) ===
Despite intermittent success, Florida had never been considered a consistent national power. This changed in 1990, when Duke head coach Steve Spurrier returned to Gainesville as the Gators' "head ball coach". Since his return, the Gators rank among the three Division I (FBS) programs with the most wins. Spurrier is credited with changing SEC football. He used a pass-oriented offense (known in the media as "fun 'n' gun"), in contrast with the ball-control, rush-oriented offense traditionally played in the conference. Spurrier's Gators won four consecutive SEC championships (1993–1996), and he once said when the Gators posed for their championship photo: "This is our annual team picture."

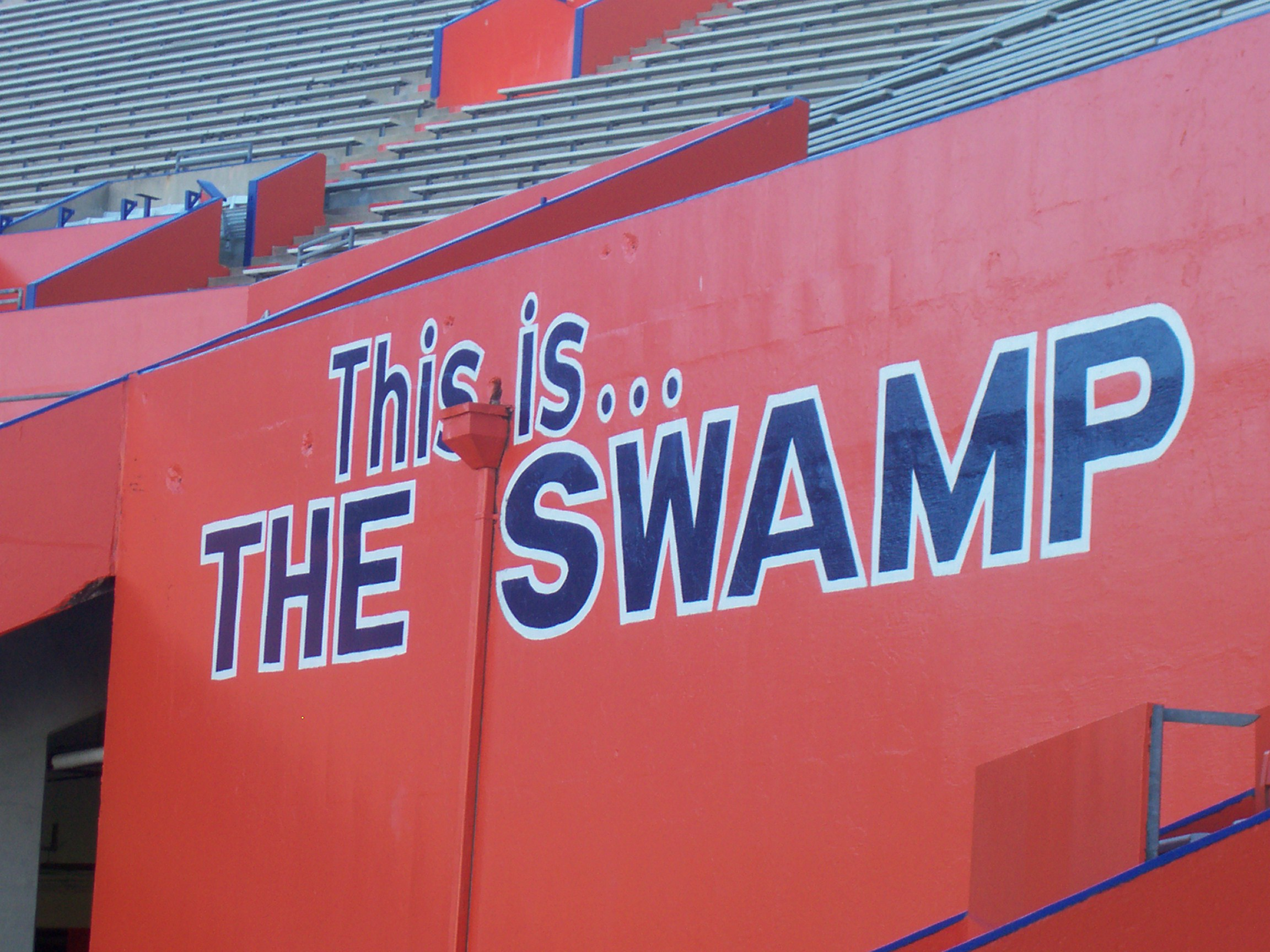
Spurrier called Florida Field "the Swamp"... "only Gators get out alive."

The 1990 Gators finished first in the SEC for the third time in their history, and for the third time they were ineligible for the SEC title because of NCAA probation. Just before Spurrier's Gator coaching debut, the Gainesville campus was rocked by the Danny Rolling murders. Combatting the gloom, the 1990 Gators opened the season with a no-huddle, 80-yard touchdown drive in six plays to defeat the Oklahoma State Cowboys 50–7. In their second game, they came from behind to beat Alabama 17–13; the 1991 Gators defeated Alabama, 35–0. Spurrier treasured the wins against the Crimson Tide: "Those victories early – '90, '91 – really got us started there at Florida ..." The 1991 Gators won the team's first official SEC championship, 59 seasons after joining the conference as a charter member. Quarterback Shane Matthews was SEC Player of the Year in 1990 and 1991. The 1992 Gators won the first of five consecutive SEC Eastern Division titles. They lost the first SEC Championship Game to eventual national champion Alabama, 28–21.

The 1993 season was the first in which the Gators were ranked in the AP top ten every week. In the second week, quarterbacks Danny Wuerffel and Terry Dean throw a total of seven interceptions against Kentucky. With eight seconds left, Wuerffel threw a pass down the middle to walk-on receiver Chris Doering for the game-winning touchdown; Gator play-by-play announcer Mick Hubert shouted, "Doering's got a touchdown!" The next week, Florida recovered and defeated Heath Shuler-led, fifth-ranked Tennessee 41–34 in a "shootout". Auburn dropped the Gators to their lowest ranking (10th) of the season. Tied 35–35 late in the game, Auburn kicked a 41-yard field goal to win 38–35. Florida's other loss was to national champion FSU. The Gators never led, although they had cut the score to 27–21. With just under six minutes left and the crowd roaring, FSU faced third down at its 21-yard-line. Heisman Trophy-winning quarterback Charlie Ward hit freshman running back Warrick Dunn up the sideline for a 79-yard touchdown and a 33–21 FSU win. The Gators defeated Alabama 28–13 in the SEC Championship and the third-ranked West Virginia Mountaineers 41–7 in the Sugar Bowl, finishing fifth in the AP Poll.

The Gators were first in the preseason AP Poll for the first time in 1994, remaining there until their loss to Auburn. Florida remained in the top five until the FSU game known as the Choke at Doak (FSU plays at Doak Campbell Stadium). The Gators led, 31–3, at the beginning of the fourth quarter before FSU scored four touchdowns. FSU coach Bobby Bowden opted to kick the extra point rather than attempt a two-point conversion, overruling nine assistants who begged him to go for the win (there was no overtime in college football at the time). The kick was good, tying the game at 31 and completing FSU's comeback. Florida edged Alabama by one point in the SEC Championship before facing the Seminoles in a rematch in the Sugar Bowl (won by FSU, 23–17). The Gators finished seventh in the AP Poll.

Florida had its first undefeated, untied regular season in 1995. The Gators' closest victory margin was 11 points as they defeated three top-10 teams. Their victory against Tennessee reportedly placed Wuerffel on the cover of Sports Illustrated instead of Tennessee quarterback Peyton Manning. The Gators lost the national championship to the Nebraska Cornhuskers, 62–24, in the Fiesta Bowl. Despite the decisive loss, they remained second in the AP Poll.

Most of Florida's 1996 offensive players were returning upperclassmen, who set dozens of team scoring records as they began the season with a 10–0 record. During this stretch, Spurrier became the Gators' all-time winningest coach, surpassing Ray Graves' 70 career wins. The Gators were only seriously threatened twice: by Tennessee (35–29) and Vanderbilt (28–21). After racing to a 35–0 lead at halftime against Tennessee, the Gators held on for the win after Tennessee scored 29 unanswered points in the second half. Against Vanderbilt, the Gators were held to 28 points due to the Commodores' relentless blitzing. Top-ranked Florida then faced second-ranked, undefeated FSU on the road to finish the regular season. With several blocking errors, the Gators fell behind in the first quarter and left Tallahassee with a 24–21 loss. Florida defeated Alabama 45–30 in the SEC Championship and Texas upset Nebraska in the inaugural Big 12 Championship Game, leaving the third-ranked Gators the best available opponent for the top-ranked Seminoles in the Sugar Bowl. For a chance at the national title, the Gators needed Ohio State to defeat second-ranked Arizona State (the only team undefeated in the regular season) in the Rose Bowl. Ohio State won on the game's final play, setting up the Sugar Bowl as the national championship game. The Gators seized the moment, defeating FSU 52–20 for their first national championship as quarterback Danny Wuerffel received MVP honors for his shotgun formation. Wuerffel and receivers Ike Hilliard and Reidel Anthony were consensus All-Americans.

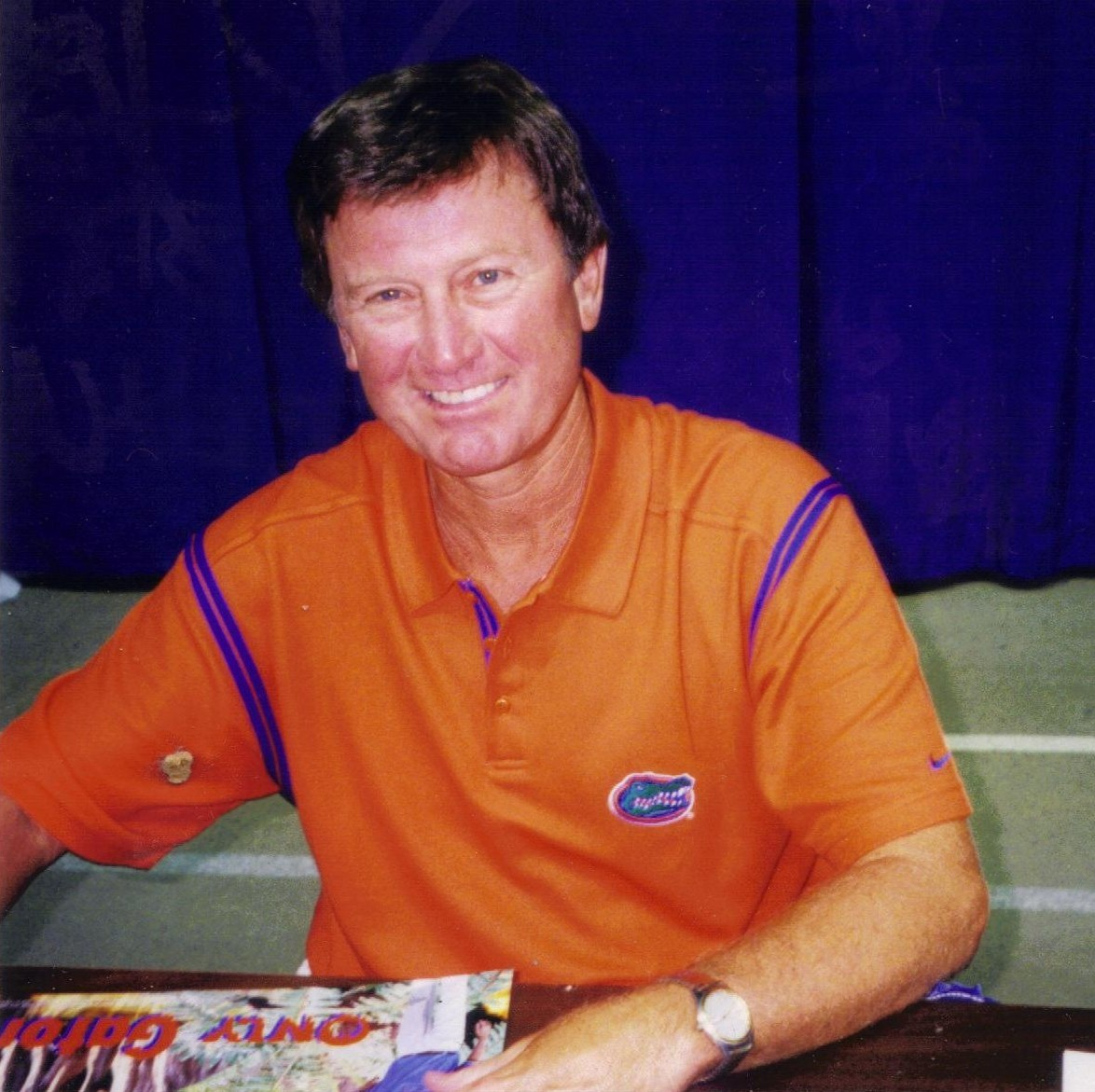
Spurrier in 1999

The 1997 Gators seemed poised for another title, never trailing Manning-led Tennessee at home to regain the top spot in the polls. (Note: Tony George memorably returned an interception 88 yards for a score. Peyton Manning went on to be the first overall pick in the NFL draft and break numerous NFL records, but ended his career without a win against Florida.) They struggled midway through the schedule, however, losing to LSU on the road and to Georgia after defeating both teams the previous year. Florida ended the regular season with a 32–29 upset of top-ranked FSU known as the "greatest game ever played in the Swamp." The Seminoles were driving late in the fourth quarter when the Gator defense stopped them at the 5-yard line, and they settled for a Sebastian Janikowski field goal for a 29–25 lead. On first down of the next drive, quarterback Doug Johnson passed to consensus All-American receiver Jacquez Green from the Gator 20-yard line for a 62-yard gain. Running back Fred Taylor completed the drive with a touchdown, and Florida took the lead for good 32–29. FSU's final comeback attempt was stymied when senior linebacker Dwayne Thomas intercepted a third-down pass from Thad Busby, costing the Seminoles a chance at the national championship.

Florida went three seasons before recapturing an SEC title in 2000. The 1998 Gators lost two games to teams which would eventually meet in the first BCS National Championship game: Tennessee and FSU. After the 1998 season, Gators offensive coordinator Carl Franks left to take the head coaching position at Duke. Spurrier also lost his defensive coordinator that offseason as Bob Stoops took the Oklahoma head coaching job. Florida returned to the SEC Championship in 1999, but lost to Alabama and then Michigan State in the Citrus Bowl. The 2000 team won Spurrier's sixth SEC championship, with one conference loss; Mississippi State defeated the Gators 47–35, breaking Florida's 72-game win streak against unranked teams. Spurrier, frustrated, rotated three quarterbacks (including Rex Grossman). After the game, Mississippi State fans stormed the field and tore down the goalposts (parts of which ended up all over campus). The preseason #1-ranked 2001 Gators appeared ready to return to the SEC Championship as favorites, but were upset 23–20 by Auburn in a last-minute field goal and lost 34–32 to Tennessee in a game postponed until December due to the September 11 attacks. Florida accepted an invitation to the Orange Bowl, defeating Maryland 56–23. Grossman was runner-up for the Heisman Trophy. In a surprise move, on January 4, 2002 Spurrier stunned Florida fans by resigning as the Gators' head coach; ten days later, he became head coach of the NFL's Washington Redskins.

=== Ron Zook era (2002–2004) ===
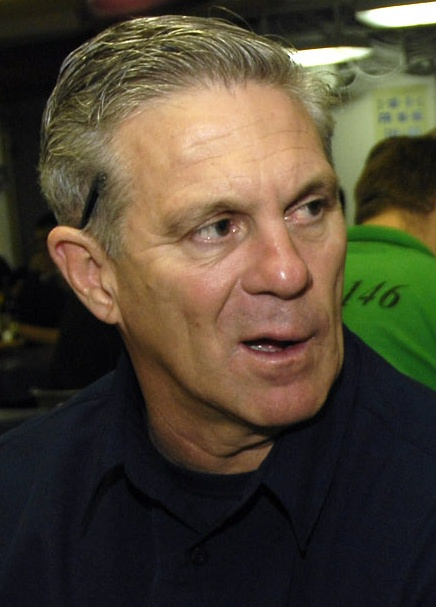
Coach Zook

Florida athletic director Jeremy Foley initiated a coaching search which focused on Denver Broncos head coach Mike Shanahan and Oklahoma Sooners head coach Bob Stoops, who served as the Gators defensive coordinator from 1996 to 1998. After both turned him down, Foley hired New Orleans Saints defensive coordinator and former Gator assistant Ron Zook as Spurrier's replacement.

Zook was a strong recruiter, signing the 20th-ranked class in an abbreviated 2002 search, the second-ranked class in 2003, and the seventh-ranked class in 2004. Zook's tenure was modestly successful, but well short of what Gator fans had come to expect. Although they were talented, Zook's teams were noted for inconsistency; they typically dominated their opponents in the first half and collapsed in the second. They defeated Georgia (its only loss of 2002) and upset LSU in 2003 on its way to the BCS Championship, but lost to both SEC Mississippi schools and twice to Miami. The Gators lost six games at Ben Hill Griffin Stadium, one more than they had in 12 years under Spurrier. On January 9, 2004, the Gators signed Zook to a two-year contract extension.

After two consecutive five-loss seasons, the 2004 season was a make-or-break year for Zook. He got into a heated argument with members of a campus fraternity after he was called in to defuse a dispute between the fraternity and his players. Following a 38–31 road loss to the 1–5 Mississippi State Bulldogs, Zook was fired but allowed to finish the regular season. In his final game, the Gators defeated the Seminoles for their first win on FSU's field since 1986. Zook accepted the head-coaching position at Illinois. Defensive coordinator Charlie Strong was interim head coach for the Peach Bowl against Miami, the first African-American head coach at Florida and the second in SEC history.

=== Urban Meyer era (2005–2010) ===
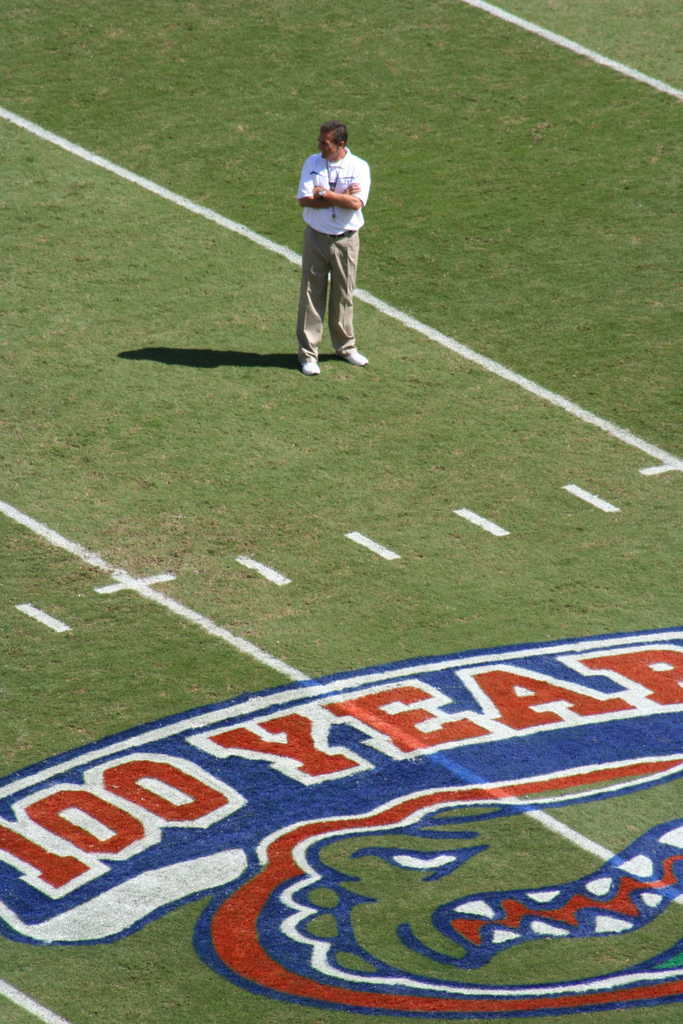
Urban Meyer and the Gators celebrated 100 years of Florida football with a BCS Championship in 2006.

Athletic director Jeremy Foley targeted a higher-profile replacement for Zook: 2004 Sporting News Coach of the Year Urban Meyer, head coach at Utah. Meyer chose Florida over competing Notre Dame, and he was announced as Florida's new head coach in December 2004. When he was hired by the Gators, Meyer signed a seven-year contract worth about $2 million annually excluding incentives.

His first season (2005) was an improvement with a 9–3 record, including an Outback Bowl win against the Iowa Hawkeyes. The Gators defeated their three biggest rivals (Tennessee, Georgia, and FSU) for only the fourth time in school history. In 2006 Florida had a 13–1 season, with its sole loss to Auburn (27–17). In their final regular-season SEC game, the Gators managed a slender 17–16 victory when Jarvis Moss blocked a fourth-quarter field-goal attempt by South Carolina. Florida defeated the Arkansas Razorbacks for the SEC championship, their first since 2000. The Gators played in the 2007 BCS Championship Game and, led by quarterback Chris Leak, defeated the #1-ranked Ohio State Buckeyes 41–14 for their second national championship.

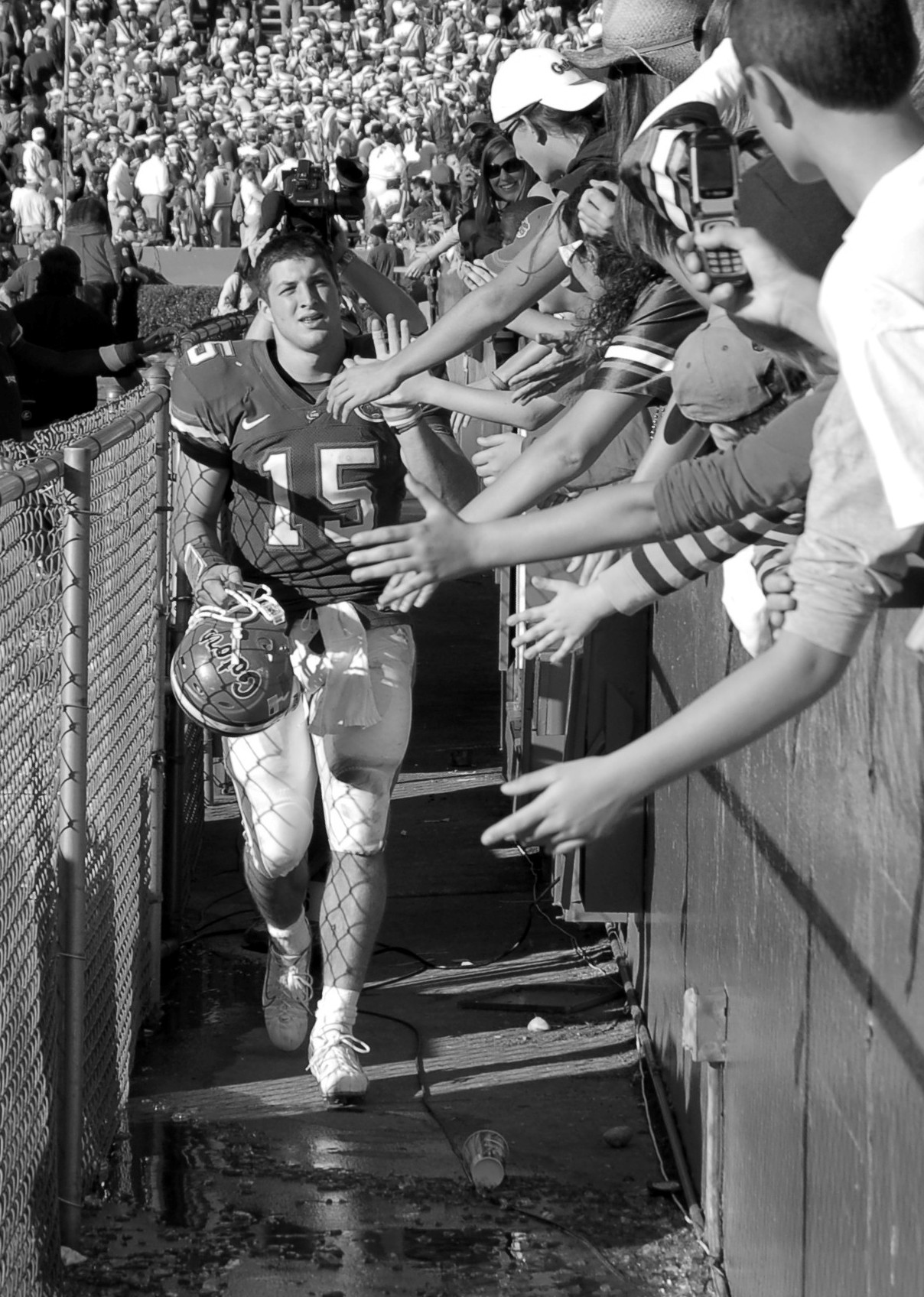
Tim Tebow

Tim Tebow became the full-time starting quarterback for the 2007 season. Although the Gators began with a 4–0 record and were ranked as high as third in media polls, a mid-season slump in which they lost three of four games to conference foes ended their hopes for another national championship. They finished with a 9–4 record and a # 13 final ranking, but Tebow's record-setting season earned him the Heisman Trophy; he was the first sophomore to receive the honor.

The 2008 Gators responded as a vastly improved team. Florida won its fourth consecutive game against Tennessee, 30–6, followed by a 31–30 upset by Ole Miss. In an emotional press conference after the game, Tebow promised that no team would play harder than Florida for the rest of the season. The Gators then earned their second national-championship berth in three years. They beat defending national champion LSU 51–21, got revenge against Georgia, handed Steve Spurrier (now back in the college ranks at South Carolina) the worst loss of his career, and defeated FSU 45–15. Florida earned the second spot in the BCS poll, beating previously undefeated Alabama 31–20 in the SEC Championship, and won the BCS National Championship Game against Oklahoma 24–14. After the 2008 season, Meyer lost his offensive coordinator Dan Mullen, who took the Mississippi State head coaching job. On August 3, 2009, Meyer signed a new six-year contract worth $4 million annually excluding incentives.

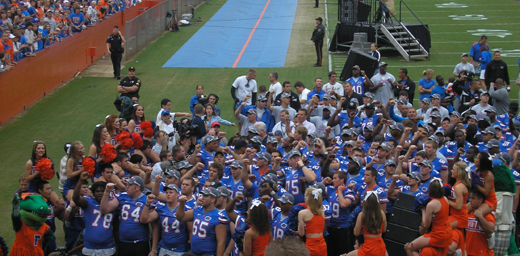
Celebration after the 2009 BCS Championship Game

The 2009 Gators were ranked first in the preseason AP and Coaches Polls. Although they had the second undefeated regular season in program history, the departures of All-American Percy Harvin and offensive coordinator Dan Mullen decreased production. Florida defeated Georgia 41–17 for the 17th time in 20 seasons, and Tebow broke the SEC career rushing touchdown record held by Herschel Walker. The Gators were ranked number one when they entered the SEC Championship against undefeated number-two Alabama. The Crimson Tide dominated the game, 32–13, and went on to win the national championship. Florida ended its season by defeating the fourth-ranked Cincinnati Bearcats 51–24 in the Sugar Bowl. In the last game of his college career, Tebow broke the Sugar Bowl record for passing yards (482) and set a BCS bowl record for total offense (533). With the Sugar Bowl victory, the Gators became the first Division I team with consecutive 13-win seasons. The 2008 and 2009 teams included consensus All-American linebacker Brandon Spikes. After the 2009 season, Meyer lost his defensive coordinator Charlie Strong, who took the Louisville head coaching job.

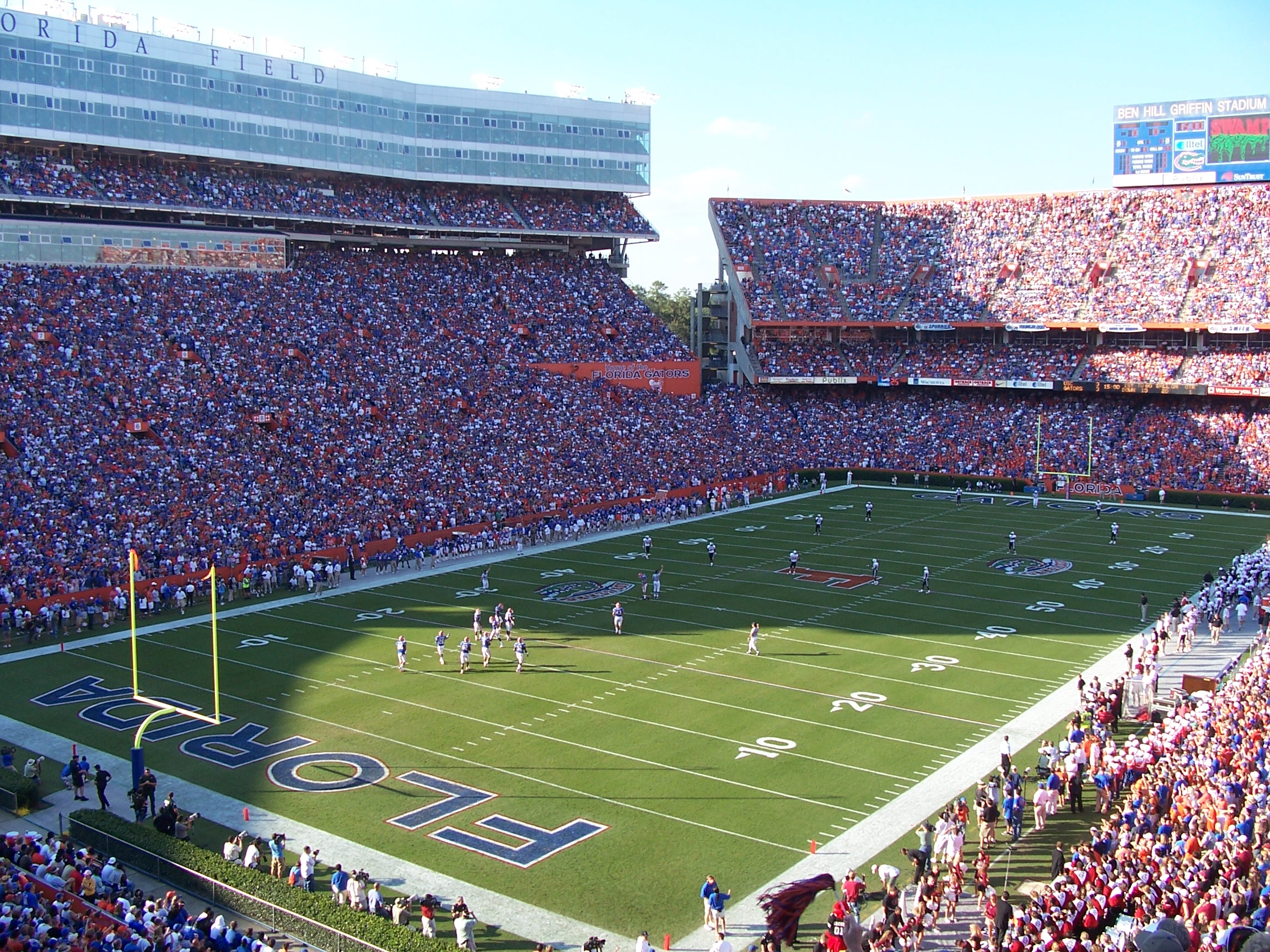
The Swamp in 2006

On December 26, 2009, Meyer announced he would resign as the Gators' head coach after their bowl game due to health and family concerns. However, the next day he said he would not resign but instead take an indefinite leave of absence. Despite uncertainty about Meyer, the Gators signed the nation's consensus number-one recruiting class in February 2010. In Meyer's absence, offensive coordinator Steve Addazio served as acting head coach. Meyer returned from his leave of absence on March 18, 2010. The 2010 Gators struggled in the fall, especially on offense, and their final record (8–5) was the worst of Meyer's head-coaching career. Florida finished the season unranked for the first time since 1989. On December 8, 2010, Meyer again announced his resignation, citing many of the concerns he had a year earlier. His final game was an Outback Bowl victory against Penn State. Meyer finished his six years at Florida with two BCS national championships, two SEC championships, a 5–1 bowl record (.8333), and an overall win–loss record of 65–15 (.8125). Additionally, offensive coordinator Steve Addazio left Gainesville to take the Temple head coaching job on December 23, 2010.

=== Will Muschamp era (2011–2014) ===
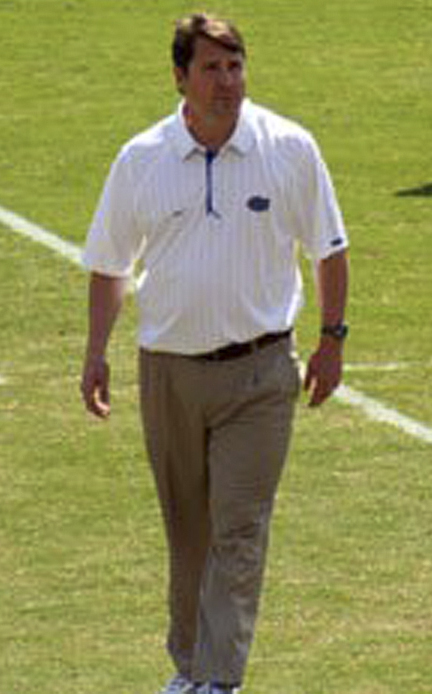
Will Muschamp

On December 11, 2010, Florida named Texas defensive coordinator Will Muschamp as the Gators' new head coach. Muschamp, a veteran defensive coordinator with stints at both LSU and Auburn, was also the Longhorns' designated "head coach-in-waiting". Muschamp arrived in Gainesville with no prior head coaching experience. Partly because of this, Charlie Weis, a four-time Super Bowl champion offensive coordinator and a former head coach at Notre Dame, was hired as associate head coach and offensive coordinator. When he was hired, Muschamp signed a five-year contract worth $2.7 million annually excluding incentives.

In spite of preseason optimism, Weis's offense struggled throughout the 2011 season. Combined with an inexperienced defense, the Gators finished with a 3–5 record in the SEC, a 7–6 overall record, and a Gator Bowl victory over Ohio State. After the 2011 season, Weis left to become head coach at Kansas. The 2012 defense was much improved. Behind a defense which had grown into one of the nation's best and a ball-control offense, Florida outscored their opponents 115–30 in the fourth quarter, posted an 11–1 regular-season record and earned their first top-five ranking since 2009. The offense, under new offensive coordinator Brent Pease, remained unimpressive, however, finishing 116th in the NCAA in passing with less than 2,000 yards. The sole regular-season loss was to Georgia, 17–9. Although the Gator season ended with an upset by Louisville, Florida finished with a top-10 ranking. The 2013 season was the Gators' worst since 1979. They lost their last seven games (including their first defeat by an FCS team, Georgia Southern), as well as losing to Vanderbilt for the first time in 23 meetings. Muschamp's 2013 Gators finished with a 4–8 record and missed a bowl game for the first time since 1990. After the lackluster 2013 season, Muschamp fired Brent Pease and replaced him with Kurt Roper. Despite the offseason assistant coaching changes, the Gators 2014 season was another disappointment. Late in the 2014 season, Muschamp was dismissed as the Florida head coach after a loss to South Carolina. His overall record as head coach was 28–21.

=== Jim McElwain era (2015–2017) ===
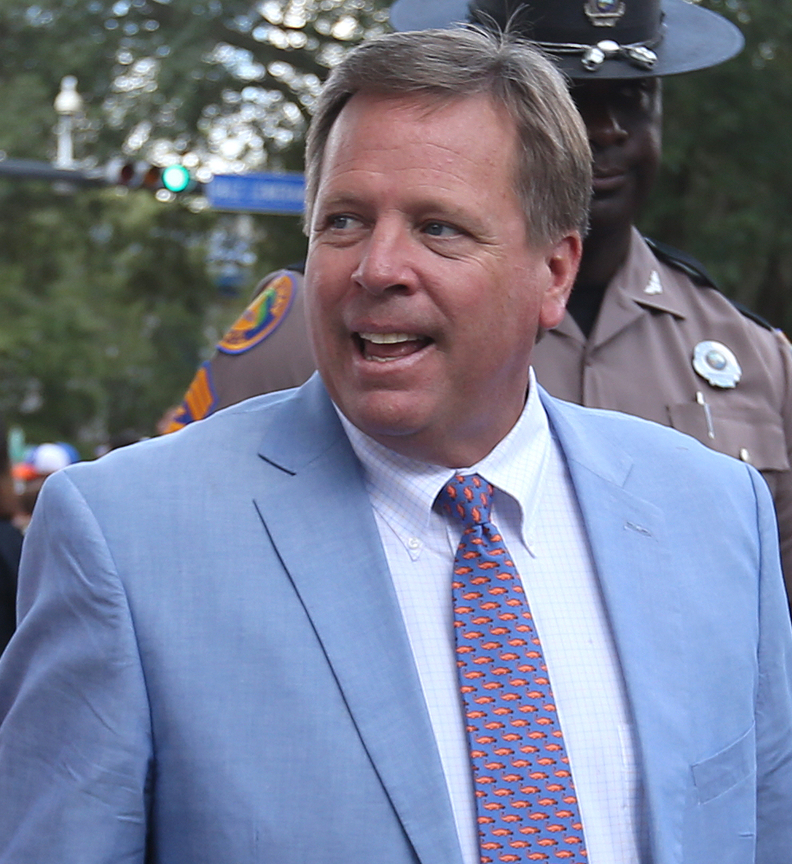
Coach McElwain

On December 4, 2014, former Alabama offensive coordinator and then-Colorado State head coach Jim McElwain was introduced as Muschamp's replacement. In his first year at Florida, he was the third coach in SEC history (and the first in the SEC East) to go to the SEC championship game in his first year. McElwain, the first Gator coach to win more than nine games in his first year at Florida, finished his first regular season with a 10–2 record. National champion Alabama easily beat the Gators in the SEC Championship 29–15. In 2016, the Gators again were SEC East champions but again lost big to Alabama in the SEC Championship, 54–16. During the 2017 season, McElwain led the Gators to a 3–4 (3–3 SEC) record through the end of October. He came under fire after claiming to have been targeted with death threats against himself and his players, a claim that university officials were unable to substantiate. On October 29–less than 24 hours after his Gators were drilled 42-7 by Georgia–McElwain and school officials mutually agreed to part ways. His 34-game tenure was the shortest for a non-interim coach in over 80 years.

Despite winning two division titles, McElwain came under fire for his teams' lackluster offensive performance. He had been tasked with reviving an offense that had become moribund under Muschamp. However, in his two full seasons in Gainesville, the Gators were 111th and 116th, respectively, in total offense–among the worst rankings for a team in a power conference, and actually lower than where they had ranked in the latter years of Muschamp's tenure. At the time of his ouster, the Gators were 112th in total offense. They only scored 30 or more points seven times, a marked turnabout from the "Fun and Gun" days. Off the field, McElwain rankled administrators with his criticisms of the state of the program. According to ESPN, McElwain's comments about the alleged death threats convinced UF officials that "this was not going to work". Defensive coordinator Randy Shannon was named interim coach for the remainder of the season, and led the Gators to a 1-3 record. Overall, the Gators finished 4-7, only their second losing record in 38 years.

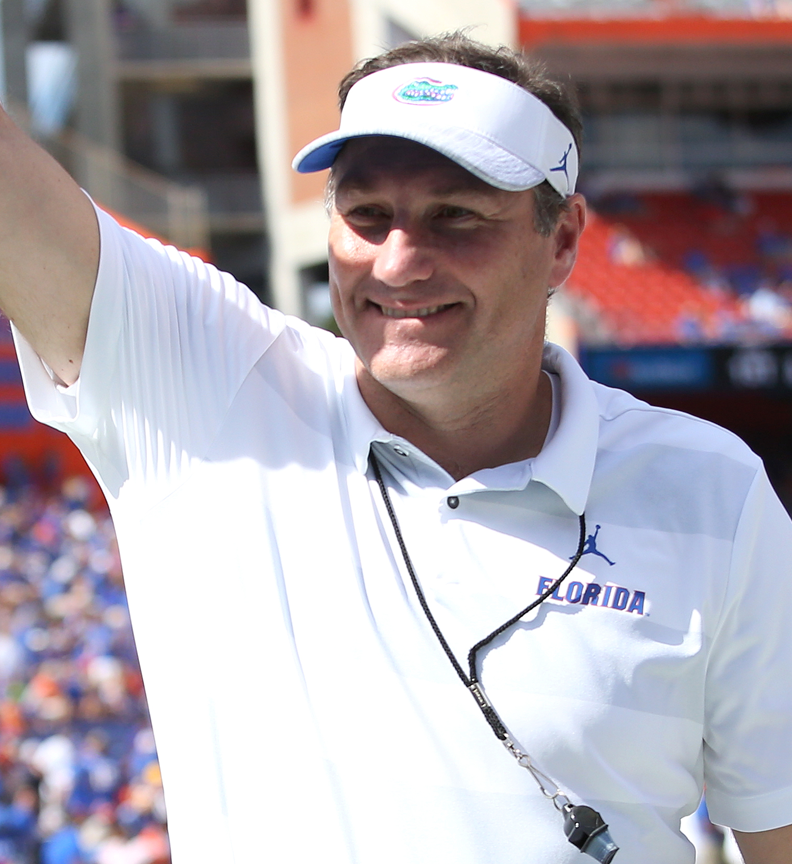
Dan Mullen

=== Dan Mullen era (2018–2021) ===
On November 26, 2017, Mississippi State head coach Dan Mullen signed a deal to become the 27th head coach of the Florida Gators football team. Prior to a successful run at MSU, Mullen had served as Urban Meyer's offensive coordinator for the Gators from 2005 to 2008.

In each of his first two seasons as the Florida's head coach, the Gators won double-digit games, including their bowl berths, and finished the season ranked in the AP's Top 10. In 2020, the Gators would lose 3 consecutive games to end the season, including their SEC Championship berth against Alabama. The following season, the Gators struggled and Mullen was fired prior to the team's final regular season game. Greg Knox was named interim head coach.

=== Billy Napier era (2022–2025) ===
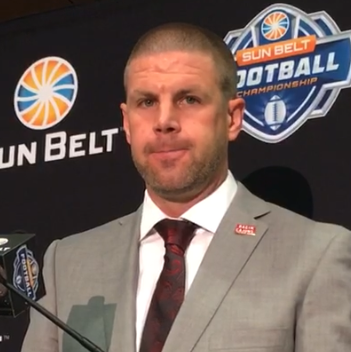
Billy Napier

On November 28, 2021, Louisiana head coach Billy Napier was named the Gators new head football coach. Prior to his head coaching stint with the Ragin' Cajuns, Napier had familiarity with the southern United States as an assistant coach at both Alabama and Clemson. He also served as offensive coordinator at Arizona State for one season in 2017. Upon arriving in Gainesville, Napier sought to encourage a new culture of toughness, discipline and accountability. When he was hired by Florida, Naper signed a seven-year contract worth $51.8 million excluding incentives.

The Gators finished a 6–7 record in 2022. They began the season with a 29–26 upset victory over #7 Utah. After a 26–16 loss to Kentucky in the season's second game, the Gators narrowly defeated in-state opponent South Florida 31–28 then lost to rival Tennessee by a score of 38–33. Napier then led the Gators to two straight victories; 52–17 over FCS opponent Eastern Washington and 24–17 over Missouri. Florida then dropped two straight rivalry games; 45–35 to LSU and 42–20 to #1 Georgia. After a 41–24 win over Texas A&M and a 38–6 win over South Carolina, the Gators dropped their last two regular season games with a 31–24 upset loss to Vanderbilt and a 45–38 loss to archrival Florida State. The Florida Gators accepted a berth in the 2022 Las Vegas Bowl, where they were blown out 30–3 by #17 Oregon State.

Napier's Gators struggled to a 5–7 record in 2023. They started the season with a 24–11 loss to #14 Utah. Florida then reeled off three straight wins; 49–7 over FCS opponent McNeese State, 29–16 over #11 Tennessee and 22–7 over Charlotte. After a 33–14 loss to Kentucky, the Gators then defeated Vanderbilt 38–14 and South Carolina 41–39. But that would be the final win of the season for the Gators, as their remaining 2023 games were all losses; 43–20 to #1 Georgia, 39–36 to Arkansas in overtime, 52–35 to #18 LSU, 33–31 to #11 Missouri and 24–15 to #5 Florida State. On November 27, 2023, on the heels of another disappointing season, Billy Napier fired defensive coordinator Sean Spencer and defensive backs coach Corey Raymond. Will Harris was hired to replace Corey Raymond and Gerald Chatman took over Sean Spencer's responsibilities. Two disappointing seasons to start Napier's tenure have led to speculation that he is on the "hot seat" entering 2024.

Over the following two seasons, Florida showed little improvement on the field finishing a combined 12–13, which ultimately led to Napier's firing on October 19th, 2025 following a messy 23–21 win at home over Mississippi State. Wide receivers coach Billy Gonzales took over as interim coach for the remainder of the season where the Gators would lose four consecutive games until a final season-ending win against in-state rivals Florida State. Napier would finish his time at Florida with an overall record of 22–23 (12–16 SEC), making him the first non-interim Florida football coach to finish with a losing overall record since Raymond Wolf in 1949.

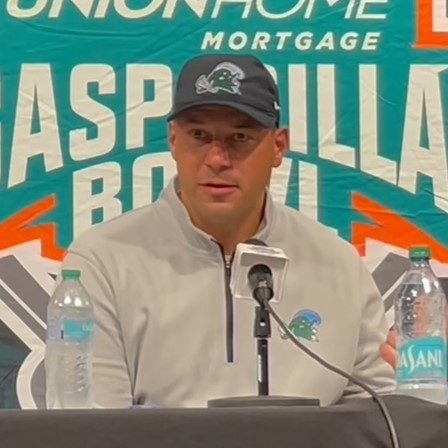
Jon Sumrall

=== Jon Sumrall era (2026-Present) ===
Following an extensive search, it was announced on November 30, 2025 that Tulane's Jon Sumrall would become the 31st head football coach of the University of Florida. Sumrall, a former linebacker at the University of Kentucky, had previously coached the Tulane Green Wave football team for two seasons, leading them to a 20–8 overall record and a College Football Playoff berth in 2025. Prior to Tulane, Sumrall served as the head coach for Troy University (2022–2023) as well as various roles on defensive staffs for Ole Miss (linebackers), Kentucky (inside linebackers/co-defensive coordinator) and San Diego Toreros football (assistant head coach/defensive line/recruiting coordinator).

== See also ==
- Florida Gators
- History of the University of Florida
- List of University of Florida Athletic Hall of Fame members
- University Athletic Association

== Bibliography ==
- 2015 Florida Gators Football Media Guide, University Athletic Association, Gainesville, Florida (2015).
- Boyles, Bob (2009). The USA Today College Football Encyclopedia. Skyhorse Publishing Inc. ISBN 9781602396777.
- Carlson, Norm (2007). University of Florida Football Vault: The History of the Florida Gators. Atlanta, Georgia: Whitman Publishing, LLC. ISBN 978-0-7948-2298-9.
- Chastain, Bill (2002). The Steve Spurrier Story. Taylor Trade. ISBN 9781461703402.
- Golenbock, Peter (2002). Go Gators! An Oral History of Florida's Pursuit of Gridiron Glory. St. Petersburg, Florida: Legends Publishing, LLC. ISBN 0-9650782-1-3.
- Graham, Klein. History of the University of Florida.
- Hairston, Jack (2002). Tales from the Gator Swamp: A Collection of the Greatest Gator Stories Ever Told. Champaign, Illinois: Sports Publishing, LLC. ISBN 1-58261-514-4.
- Horne, Larry E. (2012). Florida Gators IQ. ISBN 978-1449989477.
- Jones, James P. (1973). "F. S. U. ONE TIME A HISTORY OF SEMINOLE FOOTBALL". p. vi.
- Kabat, Ric A. (July 1991). "Before the Seminoles: Football at Florida State College, 1902–1904". Florida Historical Quarterly. 70 (1): 20–37. JSTOR 30148092.
- McCarthy, Kevin M (2000). Fightin' Gators: A History of University of Florida Football. Mount Pleasant, South Carolina: Arcadia Publishing. ISBN 978-0-7385-0559-6.
- McEwen, Tom (1974). The Gators: A Story of Florida Football. Huntsville, Alabama: The Strode Publishers. ISBN 0-87397-025-X.
- Nash, Noel (1998). The Gainesville Sun Presents The Greatest Moments in Florida Gators Football. Champaign, Illinois: Sports Publishing, Inc. ISBN 1-57167-196-X.
- Pleasants, Julian M. (2006). Gator Tales: An Oral History of the University of Florida. Gainesville, Florida: University of Florida.
- Pope, Edwin (1955). Football's Greatest Coaches – via Archive.org.
- Proctor, Samuel, & Wright Langley, Gator History: A Pictorial History of the University of Florida, South Star Publishing Company, Gainesville, Florida (1986). ISBN 0-938637-00-2.
- Roza, Greg (2007). Football in the SEC (Southeastern Conference). ReadHowYouWant.com. ISBN 978-1-4042-1919-9.
- Umphlett, Wiley Lee (1992). Creating the Big Game: John W. Heisman and the Invention of American Football. Bloomsbury Academic. ISBN 9780313284045.
