= List of Newark Bears (AFL) players =

The following people played for the Bears for at least one game in the 1926 AFL regular season, the only one of the team’s (and the league’s) existence:

Name	Position	College
Eddie Black	End	Muhlenberg
Jimmy Brewster	Blocking Back^{1}	Georgia Tech
Russ Clark	Guard^{2}	Muhlenberg
Vaughan Connelly	Back^{3}	Georgia Tech
Carl Davis	Tackle	West Virginia
Goldy Goldstein	Guard	Florida
Harold Hansen	Fullback^{4}	Minnesota
George Kerr	Guard	Catholic
Ken King	End	Kentucky
Don Manella	Guard	none
Adrian “Sparky” Maurer	Wingback	Oglethorpe
Art McManus^{5}	Guard	Boston College
John Murray	Center	Georgia Tech
Ark Newton	Wingback	Florida
Orin Rice	Guard^{6}	Syracuse, Muhlenberg
Bob Rives	Tackle	Vanderbilt
Sammy Stein	End	none
Silvio Tursi	End	Muhlenberg
Cy Williams	Tackle	Florida
Ike Williams	Back^{7}	Georgia Tech
Doug Wycoff	Tailback	Georgia Tech

^{1} Position later known as quarterback
^{2} Also played tackle
^{3} Played fullback and tailback
^{4} Also played end
^{5} After the Newark Bears folded, for the Boston Bulldogs for rest of 1926 season
^{6} Also played center
^{7} Played fullback and blocking back
