= Newark Bears (disambiguation) =

The Newark Bears is the name of four different sports teams:

- Newark Bears, a team that played from 1998 to 2013 in the Atlantic League of Professional Baseball and Canadian American Association of Professional Baseball.
- Newark Bears (International League), the original baseball team beginning in 1917 that last played in 1949.
- Newark Bears (AFL), a 1926 team of the first American Football League.
- Newark Bears, an American football team in the American Association
- Newark Bears, a name used by a descendant of the Orange/Newark Tornadoes after it was bought by the Chicago Bears
