= Cy Williams (American football) =

American football player and wrestler (1903–1965)

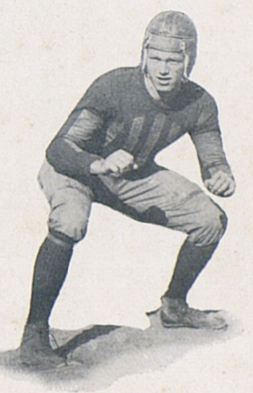
- Williams at Florida, 1923

Profile
- Position: Tackle

Personal information
- Born: October 12, 1903; Canoe, Alabama, U.S.
- Died: September 28, 1965 (aged 61); Alameda, California, U.S.
- Listed height: 6 ft 0 in (1.83 m)
- Listed weight: 200 lb (91 kg)

Career information
- College: Florida

Career history
- Newark Bears (1926); Staten Island Stapletons (1929–1930); Brooklyn Dodgers (1932)

Career AFL / NFL statistics
- Games played: 28
- Games started: 26
- Stats at Pro Football Reference

Burton Caswell "Cy" Williams (October 12, 1903 – September 28, 1965) was an American college and professional football player who was a tackle for three different professional teams in the American Football League (AFL) and National Football League (NFL) during the 1920s and early 1930s.

== Early life ==
Burton was born on October 12, 1903, in Canoe, Alabama, to Benjamin Collis Williams and Maria Prescott. His father Benjamin was a long-time turpentine operator at Sopchoppy, Florida. His father died of pellagra in 1913.

== College career ==
Williams attended the University of Florida in Gainesville, Florida, where he played for coach James Van Fleet and coach Harold Sebring's Florida Gators football teams from 1923 to 1925. In his first season on the freshman team, the team won the southern crown for freshmen squads. He was remembered as a versatile athlete and a key Gator lineman, blocking the way for such notable Gators backs as Ark Newton and Edgar Jones. During his three-year college career, the Gators had the best three-year streak in the history of the first 20 years of the Florida football program, during which the team compiled a win-loss-tie record of 25–5–4 and finished 8–2 in 1925.

One account before the start of his sophomore season at Florida reads: "Big Cy Williams, star Freshman tackle of last year and probably the Varsity tackle of this year, was the immediate cause of the 'dummy's' downfall for when he dove into the lifeless foe, it collapsed and Cy was deluged with sawdust. A new 'dummy' was brought out but it is predicted that it will not last long under the fierce tackling of the Gators gridders."

== Professional career ==
In 1926, he played professionally for the Newark Bears of the American Football League, appearing in all five games played by the Bears. The team was notable for the number of players from Georgia Tech, but also included two fellow former Gators, back Ark Newton and lineman Goldy Goldstein. The Bears are remembered for the team's financially weak ownership group, which led to the folding of the team mid-season.

During the 1929 and 1930 NFL seasons, Williams played tackle for the Staten Island Stapletons in 22 regular season games, including 21 of them as a starter. He also appeared in a single game for the NFL's Brooklyn Dodgers in 1932, before being released.

== Professional wrestling career ==
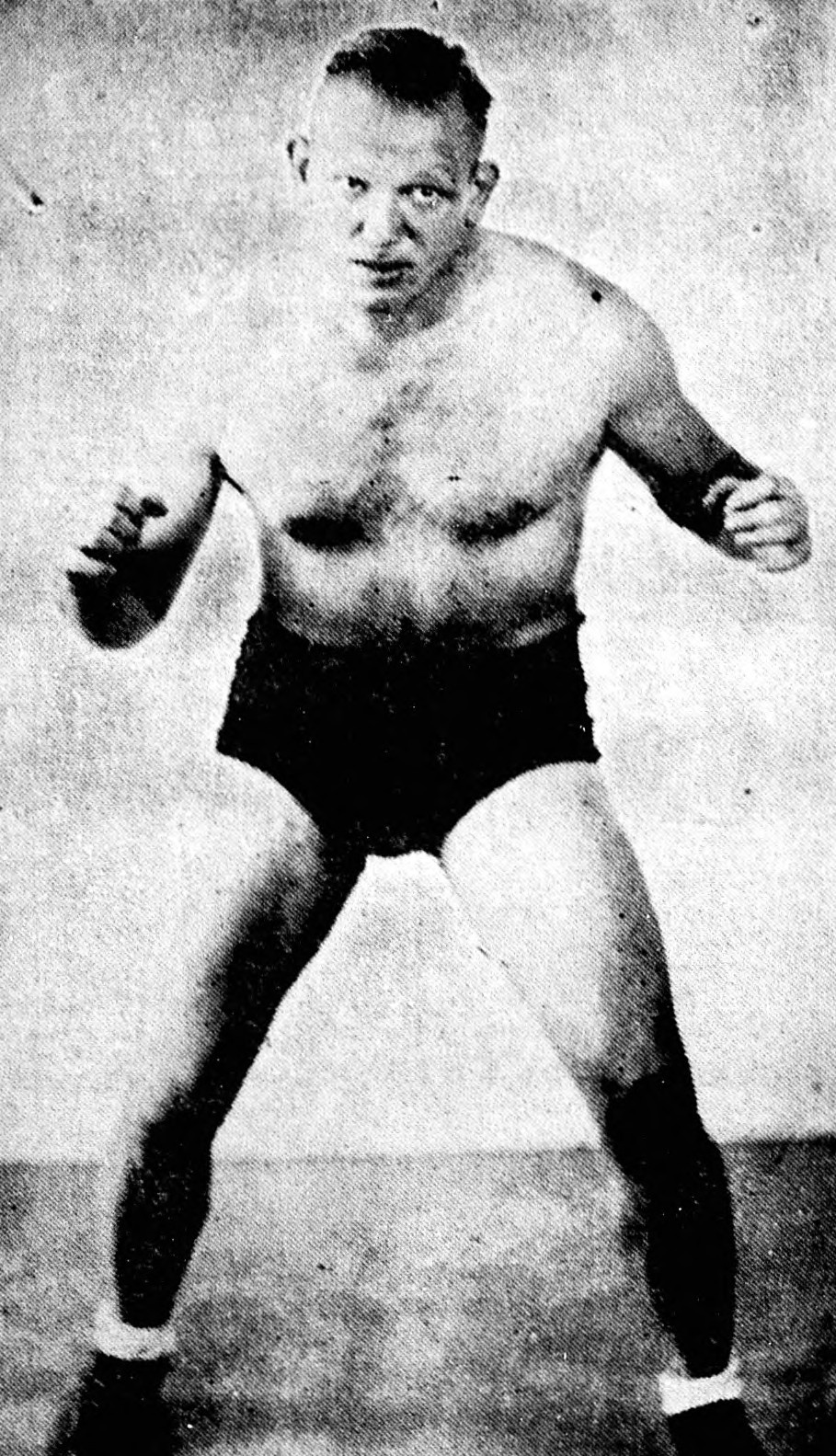
Williams, circa 1942

Williams also worked as a professional wrestler during the 1930s.

== Championships and accomplishments ==
- Championship Wrestling from Florida
  - NWA Florida Heavyweight Championship (1 time)

== See also ==
- List of Newark Bears (AFL) players
- List of Staten Island Stapletons players

== See also ==
- List of gridiron football players who became professional wrestlers
