= Elizabeth Neilson =

Elizabeth A. Neilson, EDD (October 13, 1911 – October 4, 2001) was a prominent figure in the field of health education and a leader in promoting the wellness and holistic health perspectives in public health.

She was born in West Medford, Massachusetts, the daughter of William and Anatasia (Mahoney) Neilson. She graduated from Medford High School in Medford, Massachusetts. She then attended Boston Bouve College and Northeastern University. She graduated from Boston University with a doctorate in education.

Neilson began her teaching career at the Brimmer May School in Chestnut Hill, Brookline, Massachusetts, followed by teaching in the Medford Public Schools for several years. She subsequently joined the faculty of Lowell State College where she became a full professor, then went to Boston College where she became professor and chair in the Department of Health and Physical Education for several years. Her last academic position was at Kent State University in Kent, Ohio where she was adjunct professor in the Department of Health Sciences.

She was the coauthor of numerous health textbooks and teachers’ guides. She was the founder and editor-in-chief of the journal Health Values - Achieving High Level Wellness. She also contributed articles to other journal and newsletters including Journal School of Health, Journal of Health, Physical Education and Recreation, Massachusetts Teacher, Teaching About Drugs, Teaching About Vision, and Dental Health Today.

She was active in the American School Health Association (ASHA) holding numerous positions including service on the Membership Committee, Governing Council, National Advisory Council, and the Editorial Board of the Journal of School Health. In 1968 she became President of the American School Health Association.

She served on the board of directors for the American Diabetes Association, the American Heart Association, the National Mental Health Association, the Massachusetts Cancer Society, the Middlesex Tuberculosis and Health Association, and the March Against Dental Disease Foundation. She was also a member of the National Alumni Council of Boston University.

She was the recipient of a number of awards including: the Boston-Bouver College of Human Development Distinguished Services Award, the Northeastern University Distinguished Alumni Award in Health Sciences, and the William A Howe Award from the American School Health Association. She was awarded fellowships in the American School Health Association, the National Honor Society for Women in Education, Pi Lambda Theta, and the Royal Society for Health.
