= Medford High School (Massachusetts) =

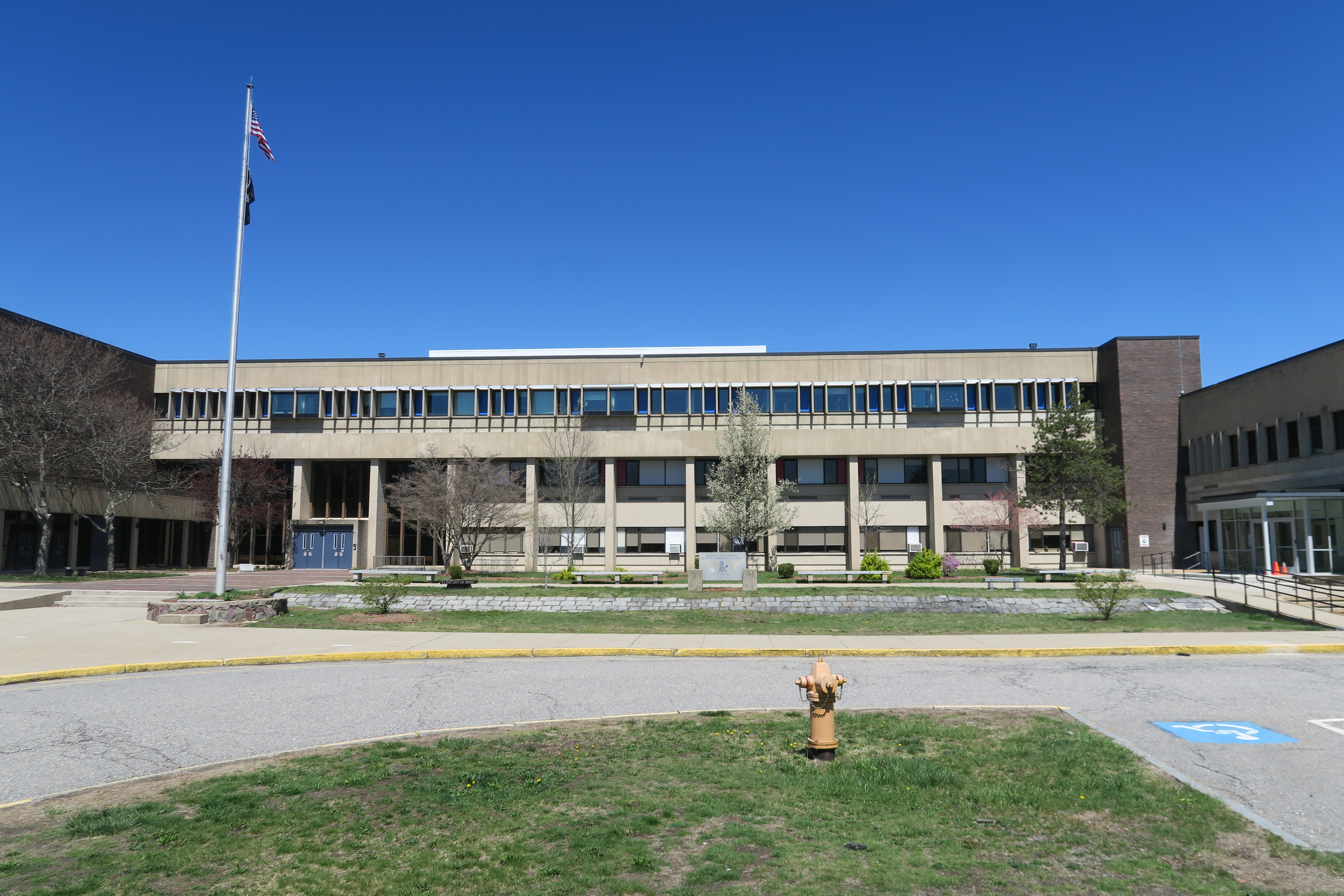
- Medford High School

Location
- 489 Winthrop Street; Medford, Massachusetts 02155; United States; 42°25′48.1″N 71°7′30.2″W

Information
- Type: Public high school
- Motto: Empowering students to reach their potential as learners
- Established: 1835; 191 years ago
- School district: Medford Public Schools
- Principal: Marta Cabral
- Teaching staff: 130.02 (FTE)
- Grades: 9-12
- Gender: Coeducational
- Enrollment: 1,195 (2024-2025)
- Student to teacher ratio: 9.19
- Campus: Suburban
- Colors: Navy and white
- Athletics: Baseball, Basketball, Cheerleading, Crew, Cross Country, E-Sports, Football, Golf, Gymnastics, Ice Hockey, Indoor Track, Lacrosse, Outdoor Track, American football , Softball, Swimming, Tennis, Volleyball
- Athletics conference: Greater Boston League
- Mascot: Mustang
- Rival: Malden High School and Somerville High School
- Accreditation: NEASC
- Newspaper: Mustang News
- Yearbook: The Blue and White
- MCAS % proficient and advanced: ELA: 97; Math: 90; Science: 75 (Spring 2014)
- Website: mhs-mvths.mps02155.org

Medford High School is a public high school located in the western edge of the Lawrence Estates section of Medford, Massachusetts, on the southwest border of the Middlesex Fells Reservation. Students in the City of Medford may also enroll in Career and Technical Education classes (formerly known as Medford Vocational-Technical High School) on the same site. The Curtis-Tufts alternative high school in South Medford is also part of the Medford Public Schools.

== History ==
The Old High School building was built between 1894 and 1896 with a rear wing including a gym added in 1914 to its location on 22-24 Forest Street near Medford Square. Additional North and South wings were added in 1929 and 1939 respectively and those wings were the only ones in use following a fire in 1965 until the close of the school in 1971.

The current campus was completed in that year and during the first decade of the 2000s underwent a major renovation in the third phase of the district's three phase school improvement plan. Between 2013 and 2014, Medford High School underwent additional renovation to improve its science labs and reopen its pool.

In 1964, 1977, and 1992 racial brawls occurred at Medford High School, injuring several students and bringing police to the school to restore order.

In 2013, the Medford High School Alumni Association (MHSAA) was founded. The Association serves as a networking bases among all MHS Alumni and works to give back to the MHS community.

== Campus ==
Medford High School, including the career and technical education wing, is located in the Lawrence Estates section of Medford and on the southwest border of the Middlesex Fells Reservation. As of 2015, Medford High School students can explore the Fells via the new "Mustang Trail."

The Greater Boston Japanese Language School (ボストン補習授業校, Bosuton Hoshū Jugyō Kō), a supplementary school for Japanese people, holds classes at Medford High. Its weekday offices are in Arlington. The school began circa 1975, and from that point it was held at Medford High.

== Curriculum ==
Most Medford High School students undertake a college preparatory curriculum that includes four classes of English, three classes each of mathematics, social studies, sciences, and for college-prep students, foreign languages, two classes each of physical education, health/wellness, one class of fine arts and one class of media and computer technology. All students must also complete sixty hours of community service throughout their four years at the school.

Students can choose from sixteen Advanced Placement courses to earn college credits.

The English department requires two general literature and writing courses, one on American literature and one on world literature, with Shakespeare appearing in three of those courses. Electives include courses in mythology, plays, writing, AP Language and Composition and AP Literature and Composition. A separate English Language Learners department includes courses for bringing non-native speakers up to fluency. The social studies core requires a credit in world history, and one in United States history with electives including contemporary issues, psychology, and AP courses in U.S. History, European History, U.S. Government and Politics, and Psychology. Humanities electives through the occupational offerings department include an Accounting/Computers sequence and Basic Finance.

Medford High School's foreign language offerings include French, Spanish, and Italian as well as courses on the cultures coinciding with those languages. There are AP electives for French and Spanish.

MHS's science department offers courses in Anatomy and Physiology, Engineering, Environmental Science, and Science Fair Projects. Its AP offerings include Biology, Chemistry, and Physics (C). Through the math and media and technology departments, computer oriented electives include C++, digital video, and web design. Math electives include AP Calculus.

The art department includes sequences in ceramics and in sculpture as well as offering AP Studio Art. Music courses include Band, Jazz Band, Chorus, and Orchestra.

The family and consumer sciences department offers a course sequence in exploring childhood, while the health department provides courses in relationships, lifestyle choices, and transitioning to adulthood.

== Extracurricular activities ==
=== Athletics ===
Medford High School is a member of the Massachusetts Interscholastic Athletic Association in the Greater Boston League. Medford High School is best known for its boys and girls soccer teams, as well as its men’s ice hockey team.

=== Clubs and publications ===
Medford High School offers a number of clubs including the Book Club, the National Honor Society, and the MHS Band. The school's yearbook is assembled by its members and Mustang News recently transitioned from an offline newspaper to an all online format.

==== Robotics Team ====
Medford High School's extracurricular underwater robotics team, named Sunk Robotics, has won the New England MATE ROV Regional three years consecutively.

=== Weekend school ===
The Japanese Language School of Boston (ボストン日本語学校 Bosuton Nihongo Gakkō), a weekend supplementary Japanese school, holds its classes at Medford High, and the school offices are in Arlington. It was established on June 7, 1975. The classes were originally held in the NEC Systems Laboratory but they began to be held at their current location after four months.

== Notable alumni ==
=== Academics, authors, mathematicians and scientists ===
- Elliot Quincy Adams, scientist (colorimetry)
- Martin Demaine, artist and mathematician
- Fannie Farmer, culinary expert and author
- Elizabeth Neilson, health educator
- Paul Theroux, author and essayist

=== Athletes ===
- Shawn Bates, NHL ice hockey player
- Frederick M. Ellis, NCAA football and basketball coach
- Chester Emerson, MLB baseball player
- Jack Garrity, Olympic ice hockey player
- George Kerr, NFL football player
- Arantxa King, Bermuda Olympic track and field athlete
- Joseph Manzo, NFL football player
- Bill Monbouquette, MLB baseball player
- Frank Morrissey, NCAA football player and coach
- Mike Pagliarulo, MLB baseball player
- Jim Reid, NCAA football coach
- Bill Riley, NCAA ice hockey player
- Jack Riley, NCAA and U.S. Olympic ice hockey coach
- David Sacco, NHL ice hockey player
- Joe Sacco, NHL ice hockey player and coach
- Eddie Tryon, NFL football player

=== Entertainers ===
- Maria Menounos, television host
- Bia, rapper
- Terri Lyne Carrington, musician
- Paul Geary, musician

=== Politicians and government employees ===
- Michael Bloomberg, mayor of New York City
- William W. Boyd III, New Hampshire politician
- Torbert H. MacDonald, congressman and captain of 1934 football team
- William L. Uanna, security officer, Manhattan Project and U.S. Atomic Energy Commission

=== Others ===
- Elizabeth Short, cold case murder victim

== Former Principals ==
- 1998–2012: Paul H. Krueger
- 2012–2018: John Perella
- 2018–2023: Paul M. D'Alleva

== Notable teachers/faculty ==
- George Stewart Miller - history department head (1912–1916); acting president of Tufts (1937–1938)
