= George Kerr (American football, born 1894) =

American football player (1894–1980)

Profile
- Positions: Guard, tackle

Personal information
- Born: November 10, 1894; Medford, Massachusetts, U.S.
- Died: December 8, 1980 (aged 86); Melrose, Massachusetts, U.S.
- Listed height: 6 ft 1 in (1.85 m)
- Listed weight: 211 lb (96 kg)

Career information
- High school: Medford
- College: Bases (1914); Catholic University (1915); George Washington (1916)

Career history
- Cleveland Tigers (1920); New York Brickley Giants (1921); Newark Bears (1926)

Career NFL statistics
- Games played: 3
- Stats at Pro Football Reference

George Ropes Kerr (November 10, 1894 – December 8, 1980) was an American professional football player. He played as guard and tackle in the National Football League (NFL) with the Cleveland Tigers in 1920 and the New York Brickley Giants in 1921. Kerr also played in the first American Football League in 1926 for the Newark Bears.

Kerr attended Medford High School in Medford, Massachusetts, where he played football as a tackle and was a shot putter on the track team. Kerr played college football at Bates College in 1914 and at Catholic University in 1915 before transferring to George Washington University in 1916, where he played football that fall was elected captain for the following season.

Kerr died on December 8, 1980.
