= Joseph Manzo =

American football player (1917–2006)

No. 46
- Position: Tackle

Personal information
- Born: February 3, 1917; Medford, Massachusetts, U.S.
- Died: October 15, 2006 (aged 89); Medford, Massachusetts, U.S.
- Listed height: 6 ft 1 in (1.85 m)
- Listed weight: 220 lb (100 kg)

Career information
- High school: Medford
- College: Boston College
- NFL draft: 1941: 8th round, 65th overall pick

Career history
- Detroit Lions (1945)

Career NFL statistics
- Games played: 3
- Games started: 1
- Stats at Pro Football Reference

Joseph M. Manzo (February 3, 1917 – October 15, 2006) was an American professional football player.

== Early life ==
A native of Medford, Massachusetts, Manzo attended Medford High School and St. John's Preparatory School in Danvers.

== Boston College ==
He played college football for Boston College. He was a member the undefeated 1940 Boston College Eagles football team that claims a national championship. As a reward for Manzo's consistency and reliability during the 1940 season, head coach Frank Leahy selected Manzo as a co-captain for the 1941 Sugar Bowl in which Boston College defeated Tennessee.

== Professional football and military service ==
He was selected by the Detroit Lions with the 65th pick in the 1941 NFL draft, but he was drafted into the Army before having a chance to play for the Lions. He served two years as part of the North African campaign in World War II. After the war, he joined the Lions for the 1945 season. He appeared in three NFL games for the Lions.

== Later life ==
After retiring from football, Manzo worked as a salesman for NP Liquors. He was inducted in 1982 into the Boston College Varsity Club Athletic Hall of Fame. He died in 2006 at age 89.
