= Canoe, Alabama =

Unincorporated community in Alabama, United States

- Unincorporated community
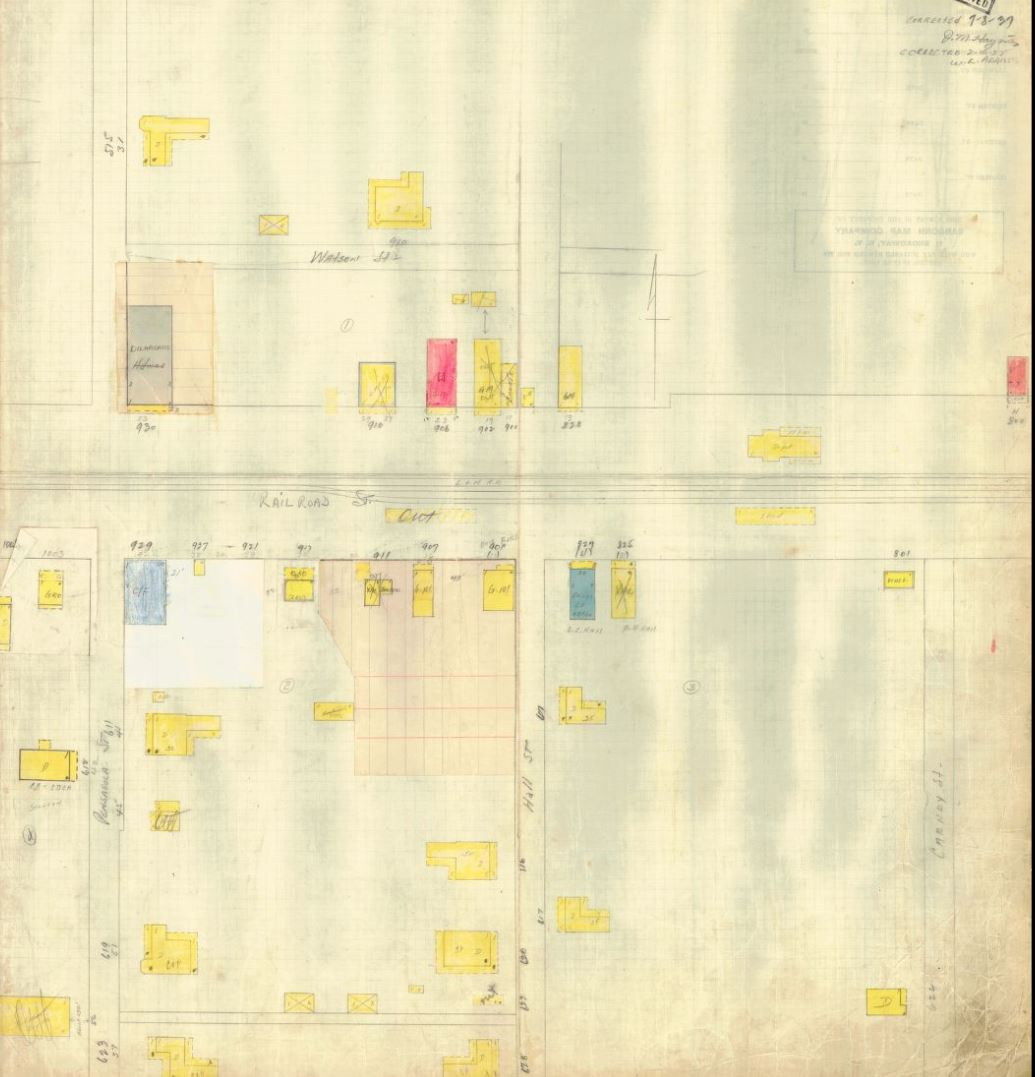
- 1922 fire insurance map of Canoe

- Location within Alabama Location within the United States
- Coordinates: 31°01′35″N 87°24′43″W
- Country: United States
- State: Alabama
- County: Escambia
- Elevation: 282 ft (86 m)
- Time zone: UTC-6 (Central (CST))
  - Summer (DST): UTC-5 (CDT)
- Area code: 251
- GNIS feature ID: 115587

Canoe is an unincorporated community in Escambia County, Alabama, United States. Originally called Canoe Station, the settlement was a stop along the Mobile and Great Northern Railroad.

== History ==
=== Civil War ===
During the American Civil War, Confederate forces operated out of the area and on March 27-March 28, 1865 10,000 Union soldiers camped in Canoe during the Canoe Rendezvous. During this 24-hour period several Union commanders brought together their forces which had been operating in the area and then moved on towards Blakeley, Alabama. Gen. C.C. Andrews mentions this period in his book, History of the Campaign of Mobile.

=== Prosperity and decline ===
The settlement grew into a town and prospered from the 1870s-1950s. New settlers came during the 1880s-early 1900s in search of cheap, cut over timberland on which to build homes and farms. The town was the site of 3 schools, a mineral spring, and a hotel, among other businesses. By the 1960s, Canoe was in an economic decline as store keepers aged, closed up shop, and as younger people moved from the town. The post office and public schools closed by the 1970s.

== Present day ==
Today, Canoe has a population of several hundred with a half dozen shops and businesses, Escambia Academy, and a water system.

The local public school district is Escambia County School District as it includes all portions of Escambia County outside of Brewton.
