= Harold Hansen (American football) =

American football and basketball coach (1894–1977)

Biographical details
- Born: November 30, 1894; Minneapolis, Minnesota, U.S.
- Died: June 23, 1977 (aged 82); Annandale, Virginia, U.S.

Playing career

Football
- 1916: Minnesota
- 1921–1923: American Legion (Ironwood, MI)
- 1923: Green Bay Packers
- 1926: Newark Bears/Demons
- Positions: Halfback, fullback, end

Coaching career (HC unless noted)

Football
- 1918: St. Thomas (MN)
- 1919–1920: Hamline
- 1921–1923: American Legion (Ironwood, MI)
- 1924–1925: Georgia Tech (backfield)
- 1926: Newark Bears/Demons
- 1927–1929: Staten Island Stapletons
- 1932: Staten Island Stapletons

Basketball
- 1924–1926: Georgia Tech

Head coaching record
- Overall: 11–5–2 (college football); 10–23 (college basketball); 0–3–2 (AFL); 2–7–3 (NFL)

Accomplishments and honors

Championships
- Football; 1 MIAC (1920)

William Alexander and Harold Hansen, 1924

Harold Frederick Hansen (November 30, 1894 – June 23, 1977) was an American football player and coach, and basketball coach. He played with the Green Bay Packers of the National Football League (NFL) in 1923, was a player and head coach for the Newark Bears/Demons of the American Football League (AFL) in 1926, and was head coach of the Staten Island Stapletons from 1927 to 1929 and again in 1932. Hansen played college football as a halfback at the University of Minnesota. He served as the head football coach at the College of St. Thomas—now known as the University of St. Thomas—in 1918 and Hamline University from 1919 to 1920. Hansen was also the head basketball coach at Georgia Tech for two seasons, from 1924 to 1926.

== Biography ==
Hansen was born on November 30, 1894, in Minneapolis. He played college football at the halfback position with Minnesota Golden Gophers football in 1916.

Hansen began his coaching career as the head football coach at two colleges located in St. Paul, Minnesota: the College of St. Thomas—now known as the University of St. Thomas—in 1918 and Hamline University from 1919 to 1920. In the summer of 1921, he was considered for an assistant coaching position at his alma mater, Minnesota, under head football coach Henry L. Williams. Hansen coached an American Legion football team in Ironwood, Michigan for two years before he was appointed, in June 1923, as the director of physical training for the city of Ironwood, with an annual salary of $3,600.

Hansen joined the Green Bay Packers of the National Football League (NFL) in 1923, prior to the team's November 18 game in Milwaukee, sat on the bench for two games, and appeared in one game as a backup against the Hammond Pros.

Hansen left Ironwood in 1924, to become a coach at Georgia Tech in Atlanta. He spent two seasons as the head coach of the Georgia Tech men's basketball team, from 1924 to 1926. He was also backfield coach for the Georgia Tech Golden Tornado football under head coach William Alexander.

Hansen coached the 1926 Newark Demons of the short-lived American Football League. This led to his hiring at the head coach of the Staten Island Stapletons, first an independent team (1927–1929) and later of the National Football League (1932).

He died on June 23, 1977, in Annandale, Virginia.

== Head coaching record ==
=== College football ===
Year	Team	Overall	Conference	Standing	Bowl/playoffs
St. Thomas Cadets (Independent) (1918)
1918	St. Thomas	2–1–1			
St. Thomas:		2–1–1			
Hamline Pipers (Independent) (1919)
1919	Hamline	5–0			
Hamline Pipers (Minnesota Intercollegiate Athletic Conference) (1920)
1920	Hamline	4–3–1	2–1–1	1st	
Hamline:		9–3–1	2–1–1		
Total:		11–5–2			
National championship Conference title Conference division title or championship game berth
