= Goldy Goldstein =

American football player (1904–1948)

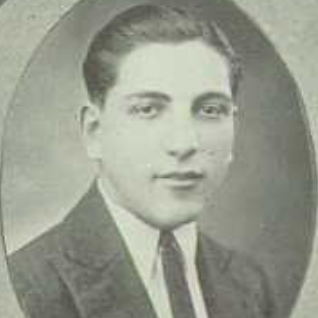
- Goldstein from 1922 Oracle yearbook

Florida Gators
- Positions: Tackle, guard
- Class: 1926

Personal information
- Born: July 17, 1904; New Jersey, U.S.
- Died: December 28, 1948 (aged 44); Dade County, Florida, U.S.
- Listed height: 6 ft 3 in (1.91 m)
- Listed weight: 210 lb (95 kg)

Career information
- High school: Duval
- College: Florida (1923–1925)

Awards and highlights
- All-Southern (1923, 1924, 1925); University of Florida Athletic Hall of Fame

Erving Max "Goldy" Goldstein (July 17, 1904 – December 28, 1948) was an American college football player for the Florida Gators football team of the University of Florida. Goldstein was an All-Southern selection following each of his three college football seasons, from 1923 to 1925.

== Early life ==
Goldstein was born in 1904 and graduated in 1922 from Duval High School in Jacksonville, Florida. While attending high school, he was a member of the basketball and football teams and the Latin Club. The 1921 Duval Tigers were 8–0 and became the first Florida team ever to be declared national champions by any organization (National Sports News Service).

== University of Florida ==
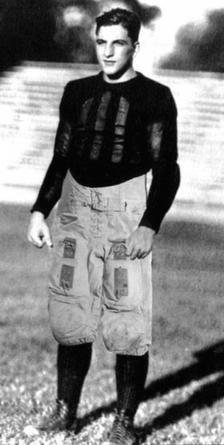
Goldstein in 1925

Goldstein enrolled in the University of Florida in Gainesville in 1922. He played at the tackle and guard positions for the Florida Gators football teams from 1923 to 1925 under coaches James Van Fleet and Harold Sebring. In his first year on the freshman team, he was a part of the team which won the southern crown for freshmen squads. Goldstein was a starter for the 16-to-6 upset victory in the rain over the Alabama Crimson Tide at Rickwood Field. He was selected as an All-Southern player each year from 1923 to 1925. He graduated with a Bachelor of Law in 1926. Goldstein was one of the first Jews to ever play for the Florida Gators.

== Later life ==
In 1926, Goldstein played professional football with the Newark Bears of the American Football League. The Bears are remembered for the team's financially weak ownership group, which led to the folding of the team mid-season. The team played only five games before folding in October 1926.

After his brief career as a professional football player ended, Goldstein worked as a lawyer in Miami Beach. He was a founder of the law firm of Goldstein, Klein, Burris & Lehrman, the ranks of which later included Florida Governor Fuller Warren.

In 1942, he received a commission as a first lieutenant in the Army Air Corps. In 1945, he was discharged at the rank of Captain after serving in China, Burma, India.

Goldstein died in an automobile accident in 1948 at age 44. He was posthumously inducted into the University of Florida Athletic Hall of Fame in 1989.

== See also ==
- Florida Gators
- List of Levin College of Law graduates
- List of University of Florida Athletic Hall of Fame members
