= Newark Bears (AFL) =

American football team

General information
- Founded: 1926
- Folded: 1926
- Stadium: Davids' Stadium
- Headquartered: Newark, New Jersey, United States
- Colors: Purple, White

Personnel
- Owner: The New Jersey Athletic Association
- Head coach: Harold Hansen (American football)Harold Hansen

Team history
- Newark Bears (1926); Newark Demons (1926)

League / conference affiliations
- American Football League (1926)

The Newark Bears were a professional American football team that competed in the first American Football League in 1926 AFL season. Owned by the New Jersey Athletic Association (headed by NJAA president William Coughlin), the Bears played their home games in Davids' Stadium. Coached by player-coach Harold Hansen, the majority of the team played their college football in Georgia and Florida.

Tailback Doug Wycoff scored the club’s only points in its existence, having a touchdown run and kicking the extra point to tie the Chicago Bulls in both teams’ opening game of the season. While the Bears’ defense was respectable (yielding only five points per game), the lack of offensive production resulted in a record of no wins, three losses, and two ties. While the Bears played in front of (an announced total of) 40,000 spectators in Philadelphia (a 9-0 loss to the Quakers on October 16), the total attendance for three home games in Newark was less than 5,000. After only 400 fans attended a scoreless game (with the Rock Island Independents) in Davids’ Stadium on October 24, 1926, the Bears withdrew from the AFL... the first team to call it quits in the American Football League. The exodus from the league continued through the month of November, until there were only four teams left, dooming the league.

For the team's last league game, the name of the team was changed to the Newark Demons.

Year	W	L	T	Finish	Coach
1926	0	3	2	9th	Harold Hansen

== Takeover by the Staten Island Stapletons ==
After its withdrawal from the AFL, the Bears became an independent team. During a November 14, 1926, game against the Staten Island Stapletons, the Bears defeated the Stapes, 33–0. Unhappy with the defeat of his Staten Island team, owner Dan Blaine promptly hired most of the Newark players, including star rookie Doug Wycoff, who were still owed money because of Newark's financial problems. As a result, the Bears went out of business while the Stapletons benefited from Newark's folding. In 1928, Blaine further upgraded the team by signing some players from New York University. The Stapletons had a 10–1–1 record that season and were 3–1 against NFL teams. The Stapletons joined the NFL in 1929 and played there until 1932.

== After the first AFL ==
After the dissolution of the Newark Bears on October 24, 1926, guard Art McManus returned to his hometown Boston to play with the Bulldogs for the remainder of the season. While his major league football career ended with the folding of the Bulldogs three weeks later, the career of the only person to score points for the Bears, Doug Wycoff extended beyond the end of the AFL, joining the New York Giants for the 1927 season. Wycoff later played for the 1927 New York Giants, 1929–30 Staten Island Stapletons, 1931 New York Giants, 1932 Staten Island Stapletons, and the 1934 Boston Redskins of the National Football League. He came out of retirement in 1936 to play for the Boston Shamrocks in the second American Football League.

While Wycoff was the only member of the 1926 Newark Bears playing in the NFL in 1927, four of his Newark teammates eventually joined NFL rosters:

- Orin Rice – 1929 New York Giants
- Sammy Stein – 1929–30 Staten Island Stapletons, 1931 New York Giants, and 1932 Brooklyn Dodgers
- Cy Williams – 1929–30 Staten Island Stapletons, 1932 Brooklyn Dodgers
- Ike Williams – 1929 Staten Island Stapletons

== See also ==
- List of Newark Bears (AFL) players
