= List of Chicago Bulls (AFL) players =

The following people played for the Chicago Bulls for at least one game in the 1926 AFL regular season, the only one of the team's (and the league's) existence:

Name	Position	College
Eddie Anderson	End	Notre Dame
Hal Blackwood	Guard	Chicago, Northwestern
Jack Boyle	End	Loras
Garland Buckeye	Guard	none
Ward Connell^{1}	Wingback^{2}	Notre Dame
Mush Crawford	Tackle^{3}	Beloit, Lake Forrest, Illinois
John Fahay^{4}	End	St. Thomas, Marquette
Bill Giaver^{5}	Wingback	Georgia Tech
Aubrey Goodman	Tackle^{2}	Baylor, Chicago
Fred Graham^{6}	End	Indiana State, West Virginia
Harry Hall	Blocking Back^{7}	Chicago, Illinois
Ojay Larson	Center	Notre Dame
Red Mahan^{8}	Guard	West Virginia
John McMullan	Tackle	Notre Dame
Johnny Mohardt	Tailback	Notre Dame
Doss Richerson	Tackle^{2,3}	Missouri
Dick Romey	End	Iowa
Dick Stahlman^{9}	Tackle^{3}	DePaul, Northwestern
Joey Sternaman	Blocking back	Illinois
Red Strader	Back^{10}	St. Mary's
Swede Swenson	Guard	Chicago, Dartmouth
Jimmy Tays	Tailback	Penn State, Chicago
Buck White	Fullback	Howard Payne, Valparaiso
Sam Whiteman	Back^{11}	Missouri

^{1} Started season with Chicago Bears
^{2} Also played end
^{3} Also played guard
^{4} Finished season with Racine Tornadoes
^{5} Finished season with Louisville Colonels
^{6} Played for both Frankford Yellow Jackets and Providence Steam Roller before joining Bulls
^{7} Also played tailback
^{8} Started season with Frankford Yellow Jackets
^{9} Started season with Rock Island Independents
^{10} Played both wingback and fullback
^{11} Played wingback, tailback, and fullback
