= List of Philadelphia Quakers (AFL) players =

The following people played for the Philadelphia Quakers for at least one game in the 1926 AFL regular season, the only one of the team’s (and the league’s) existence:

Name	Position	College
Les Aplundh	Back^{1}	Swarthmore
Bob Beattie	Wingback^{2}	Princeton
Bull Behman	Tackle	Dickenson
Charlie Carton	Tackle^{3}	Holy Cross
Bill Coleman	Guard	Pennsylvania
Saville Crowther	Guard	Colgate
Bob Dinsmore	Back^{4}	Princeton
Doc Elliott^{5}	Back^{6}	Lafayette
Jerry Fay	Tackle^{7}	Grove City
Adrian Ford	Wingback^{2}	Lafayette
Lou “Red” Gebhard	Wingback	Lafayette
Knute Johnson	End	Muhlenberg
Glenn Killinger^{8}	Tailback	Penn State
Joe Kostos	End	Bucknell
Al Kreuz	Fullback	Western Michigan, Pennsylvania
Joe Marhefka	Tailback	Penn State, Lafayette
Century Milstead	Tackle	Wabash, Yale
Karl Robinson	Center	Pennsylvania
Johnny Scott	Blocking back	Lafayette
Butch Spagna	Guard	Brown, Lehigh
George Sullivan	Tailback	Pennsylvania
Whitey Thomas	End	Penn State
George Tully	End	Dartmouth
Charley Way	Back^{9}	Penn State

^{1} Played fullback, blocking back (position later called “quarterback”), and wingback
^{2} Also played end
^{3} Also played center
^{4} Played blocking back, tailback, wingback, and fullback
^{5} Played five games for Cleveland Panthers before the team folded
^{6} Played tailback and fullback
^{7} Also played guard and end
^{8} Started 1926 season on New York Giants roster
^{9} Played wingback, tailback, and blocking back
