= Mush Crawford =

American football player and coach (1898–1966)

Profile
- Position: Guard

Personal information
- Born: December 23, 1898; Waukegan, Illinois, U.S.
- Died: October 27, 1966 (aged 67); Roanoke, Virginia, U.S.
- Listed height: 6 ft 0 in (1.83 m)
- Listed weight: 200 lb (91 kg)

Career information
- College: Beloit, Illinois, Lake Forest

Career history

Playing
- Chicago Bears (1925); Chicago Bulls (1926); New York Yankees (1927)

Coaching
- Football: San Jose State (1929–1931) Head coach; Miami (FL) (1933) Freshmen coach; Stout Institute (1935–1937) Head coach; Basketball: Stout Institute (1936–1938) Head coach; Baseball: San Jose State (1929–1932) Head coach

Awards and highlights
- National champion (1923)
- Stats at Pro Football Reference

Walter Charles "Mush" Crawford (December 23, 1898 – October 27, 1966) was an American football player and coach. He played professionally as a guard in the National Football League (NFL). Crawford first played with the Chicago Bears during the 1925 NFL season. During the 1927 NFL season he played with the New York Yankees. He also had been a member of the Chicago Bulls of the American Football League during the 1926 American Football League season.

Crawford served as the head football coach at San Jose State Teachers College (now known as San Jose State University) from 1929 to 1931 and at the Stout Institute (now known as the University of Wisconsin–Stout) from 1935 to 1937.

== Head coaching record ==
=== Football ===
Year	Team	Overall	Conference	Standing	Bowl/playoffs
San Jose State Spartans (Far Western Conference) (1929–1931)
1929	San Jose State	3–3–1	2–1–1	3rd	
1930	San Jose State	2–3–3	1–2–1	4th	
1931	San Jose State	1–8	0–5	6th	
San Jose State:		6–14–4	3–8–2		
Stout Institute Blue Devils (Wisconsin State Teachers College Conference) (1935–1937)
1935	Stout Institute	1–6	0–4	5th (Northern)	
1936	Stout Institute	0–5–1	0–3–1	5th (Northern)	
1937	Stout Institute	0–6–1	0–3–1	5th (Northern)	
Stout Institute:		1–17–2	0–10–2		
Total:		7–31–6			
