= Bill Giaver =

American football player (1898–1991)

Profile
- Position: Back

Personal information
- Born: May 29, 1898; Chicago, Illinois, U.S.
- Died: June 20, 1991 (aged 94); Pinellas County, Florida, U.S.
- Listed height: 5 ft 9 in (1.75 m)
- Listed weight: 190 lb (86 kg)

Career information
- College: Georgia Tech

Career history
- Hammond Pros (1922); Rock Island Independents (1923); Racine Legion (1924); Hammond Pros (1925); Chicago Bulls (1926); Louisville Colonels (1926)

Career NFL statistics
- Games played: 28
- Games started: 20
- Touchdowns: 4
- Stats at Pro Football Reference

Einar William Giaver (May 29, 1898 – June 20, 1991) was an American football back in the National Football League (NFL). He played for the Hammond Pros, Rock Island Independents, Racine Legion, Chicago Bulls, and Louisville Colonels from 1922 to 1926. He played collegiately for Georgia Tech.
