= Marchewka =

Marchewka, also spelled Marhefka, is a surname. Notable people with this surname include:

- Arkadiusz Marchewka (born 1986), Polish politician
- Zofia Marchewka (died 1717), Polish witch trial victim
- Joe Marhefka (1902–2003), American football player
