= Bob Folwell =

American football player and coach (1885–1928)

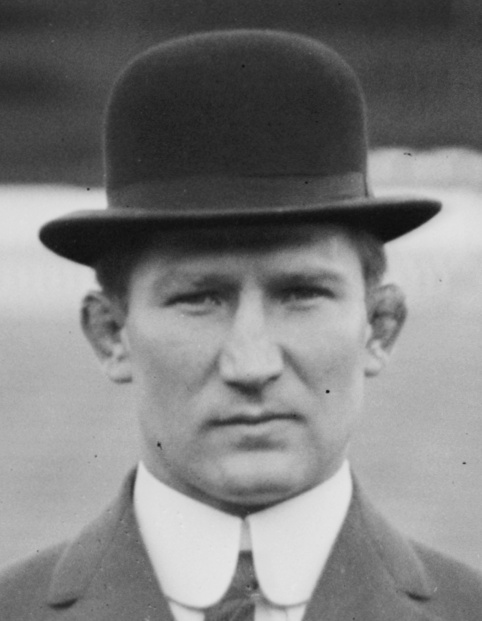

Biographical details
- Born: February 17, 1885; Mullica Hill, New Jersey, U.S.
- Died: January 8, 1928 (aged 42); Philadelphia, Pennsylvania, U.S.

Playing career
- 1904–1907: Penn
- Position: Halfback

Coaching career (HC unless noted)
- 1909–1911: Lafayette
- 1912–1915: Washington & Jefferson
- 1916–1919: Penn
- 1920–1924: Navy
- 1925: New York Giants
- 1926: Philadelphia Quakers
- 1927: Atlantic City Roses

Head coaching record
- Overall: 106–29–9 (college); 8–4 (NFL)
- Bowls: 0–1–1

Accomplishments and honors

Championships
- 2× National (1904, 1907)

Robert Cook Folwell Jr. (February 17, 1885 – January 8, 1928) was an American football player and coach. He served as the head coach at Lafayette College (1909–1911), Washington & Jefferson College (1912–1915), the University of Pennsylvania (1916–1919), and the United States Naval Academy (1920–1924), compiling a career college football record of 106–29–9. Folwell then moved to the professional ranks, coaching the New York Giants of the National Football League (NFL) in 1925, the Philadelphia Quakers of the American Football League in 1926, and the Atlantic City Roses of the Eastern League of Professional Football in 1927.

== Early life and playing career ==
Folwell was born in the Mullica Hill section of Harrison Township, New Jersey in 1885. He attended Haverford Grammar School, where he made prep football All-American. He married Elizabeth Pennock in 1913 and had three sons: Robert III, George P. and William Nathan. He attended the University of Pennsylvania, where he set several school football records that stand to this day. He also starred as a wrestler. He won the Intercollegiate Wrestling Association's 175-pound title in 1907.

== College coaching career ==
=== Lafayette ===
Folwell coached Lafayette College from 1908 through 1911, amassing a 19–2–1 record.

=== Washington & Jefferson ===
After hearing rumors that Folwell was unhappy at Lafayette, Robert "Mother" Murphy personally recruited him to coach for Washington & Jefferson College, where he coached from 1912 to 1915 and post a 36–5–3 record and was named coach of the year in 1913.

In Folwell's first season, Washington & Jefferson held the legendary scorer Jim Thorpe and the Carlisle Indians to a scoreless tie. In 1913, the team posted a 10–0–1 record and were the highest scoring team in the nation. That season featured a scoreless tie of Yale, a 100–0 defeat of Grove City College, and a 17–0 victory over Penn State that broke the Nittany Lions' 19-game winning streak, earning the entire school a day off to celebrate. Sportswriter Walter S. Trumbull of The New York Sun suggested that the Michigan Aggies, Washington & Jefferson, Chicago University, and Notre Dame were the new "Big 4 of College Football" instead of the traditional grouping of Princeton, Yale, Harvard, and Penn. Folwell's 1914 squad lost at Harvard in front of 15,000 fans by a score of 10–9. If not for an errant kick that hit the crossbar, W&J would have won the same and at least a share of the mythical national championship. That squad saved face by becoming only the seventh team to ever defeat Yale, with a decisive 13–7 victory. The game received national press coverage, and the team received a personal note of congratulations by Theodore Roosevelt.

=== Penn ===
Folwell then coached at University of Pennsylvania from 1916 to 1919, where he posted a 27–10–2 record. During the 1918 Spanish flu, Folwell was hospitalized for the virus.

=== Navy ===
Folwell was the 17th head football coach at the United States Naval Academy and he held that position for five seasons, from 1920 until 1924. His coaching record with Navy was 24–12–3.

== Professional coaching career and death ==
Folwell was the first head coach for the New York Giants of the National Football League (NFL), in 1925. The following season he took the same position for the Philadelphia Quakers of the first American Football League and led the team to the championship of the short-lived league. He coached the Atlantic City Roses of the Eastern League of Professional Football in 1927, but was forced to retire to his farm in New Jersey after one season. A hip infection, which began while he was coaching the Philadelphia Quakers, worsened, forcing him to walk with a cane. In January 1928, he had a hip operation at Jefferson Hospital in Philadelphia. The surgery was initially successful, but he took a turn for the worse and died January 8, 1928.

== Head coaching record ==
=== College ===
Year	Team	Overall	Conference	Standing	Bowl/playoffs
Lafayette (Independent) (1909–1911)
1909	Lafayette	7–0–1			
1910	Lafayette	7–2			
1911	Lafayette	5–0			
Lafayette:		19–2–1			
Washington & Jefferson Red and Black (Independent) (1912–1915)
1912	Washington & Jefferson	8–3–1			
1913	Washington & Jefferson	10–0–1			
1914	Washington & Jefferson	10–1			
1915	Washington & Jefferson	8–1–1			
Washington & Jefferson:		36–5–3			
Penn Quakers (Independent) (1916–1919)
1916	Penn	7–3–1			L Rose
1917	Penn	9–2			
1918	Penn	5–3			
1919	Penn	6–2–1			
Penn:		27–10–2			
Navy Midshipmen (Independent) (1920–1924)
1920	Navy	6–2			
1921	Navy	6–1			
1922	Navy	5–2			
1923	Navy	5–1–3			T Rose
1924	Navy	2–6			
Navy:		24–12–3			
Total:		106–29–9			

=== NFL ===
Team	Year	Regular season				
Team	Year	Won	Lost	Ties	Win %	Finish
NYG	1925	8	4	0	.667	4th in NFL
Total		8	4	0	.667	

*Interim head coach
