= Karl Robinson (American football) =

American football player (1902–1999)

Profile
- Position: Center

Personal information
- Born: October 2, 1902; Pennsylvania, U.S.
- Died: September 29, 1999 (aged 96)
- Listed height: 5 ft 10 in (1.78 m)
- Listed weight: 180 lb (82 kg)

Career information
- High school: Greensburg-Salem (PA); Mercersburg Academy (PA)
- College: Penn

Career history
- Philadelphia Quakers (1926)

Awards and highlights
- AFL Champion (1926)

Karl E. Robinson (October 2, 1902 – September 29, 1999) was an American professional football player in the first American Football League. At center, he played just one season for the Philadelphia Quakers, helping the team win the league's sole title in 1926.
