= Chicago Bulls (disambiguation) =

The Chicago Bulls are an American professional basketball in the National Basketball Association.

Chicago Bulls may also refer to:

- Chicago Bulls (AFL), American football team in the American Football League in 1926
- Chicago Bulls, American football team in the United Football League in the 1960s
- Chicago Bulls College Prep, high school on the Near West Side of Chicago
