= Ward Connell =

American football player (1901-1946)

Personal information
- Born: July 14, 1901; Beloit, Wisconsin, U.S.
- Died: February 7, 1946 (aged 44); Chicago, Illinois, U.S.
- Listed height: 5 ft 10 in (1.78 m)
- Listed weight: 173 lb (78 kg)

Career information
- College: Notre Dame

Career history
- Chicago Cardinals (1926); Chicago Bulls (1926)

Awards and highlights
- National champion (1924)

Ward Thomas 'Doc' Connell was an American professional football player in the National Football League and the American Football League. He played at the collegiate level with the Notre Dame Fighting Irish, helping the team win the 1924 National Championship and the 1925 Rose Bowl Game. Connell later became an assistant coach with the Wisconsin Badgers.
