= Jimmy Tays =

American football player (1899–1986)

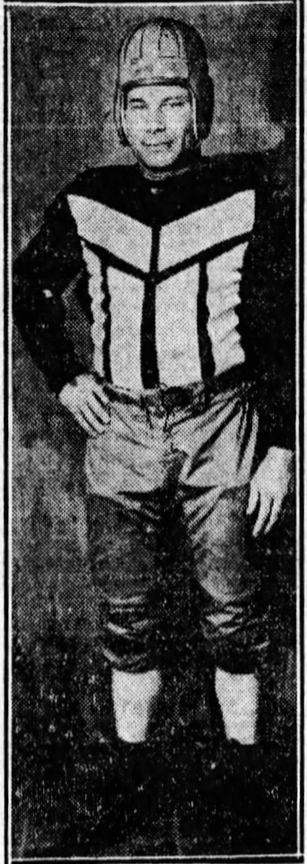
- Tays in 1928

No. 4
- Position: Halfback

Personal information
- Born: March 10, 1899; Iron Mountain, Michigan, U.S.
- Died: June 21, 1986 (aged 87); Champaign, Illinois, U.S.
- Listed height: 5 ft 8 in (1.73 m)
- Listed weight: 174 lb (79 kg)

Career information
- High school: Tolono (Tolono, Illinois)
- College: Penn State, Chicago

Career history
- Chicago Cardinals (1925); Chicago Bulls (1926); Dayton Triangles (1927); Cincinnati National Guards (1928–1929); Newark Tornadoes (1930); Staten Island Stapletons (1930)

Awards and highlights
- NFL champion (1925)
- Stats at Pro Football Reference

James Elmer Tays (March 10, 1899 – June 21, 1986) was an American professional football halfback who played three seasons in the National Football League (NFL) with the Chicago Cardinals, Dayton Triangles, Newark Tornadoes, and Staten Island Stapletons. He played college football at Pennsylvania State University and the University of Chicago. He was a member of the Cardinals team that were NFL champions in 1925.

== Early life and college ==
James Elmer Tays was born on March 10, 1900, in Iron Mountain, Michigan. His grandfather, Christopher Tays, was born as a slave in Virginia circa 1829 and later served in the 65th U.S. Colored Troops Regiment during the Civil War.

Tays played high school football at Tolono High School in Tolono, Illinois. He played college football at Pennsylvania State University and the University of Chicago.

== Professional football career ==
Tays played in nine games, starting two, for the Chicago Cardinals of the National Football League (NFL) in 1925 and scored one fumble recovery touchdown. The Cardinals finished the season with an 11–2–1 record and were named NFL champions. He was listed as a halfback during his stint with the Cardinals.

Tays appeared in two games, starting one, for the Chicago Bulls of the American Football League in 1926.

He played in seven games, all starts, for the NFL's Dayton Triangles in 1927. The Triangles went 1–6–1 that year.

Tays was a player-coach for the Cincinnati National Guards from 1928 to 1929.

Tays played one game for the Newark Tornadoes of the NFL in 1930 before being released.

He then played in three games, starting one, for the Staten Island Stapletons of the NFL in 1930.

== Personal life ==
Tays also spent time as a baseball player in the Chicago White Sox organization. He later become a farmer in Fisher, Illinois. He was a state fair superintendent in the 1950s.

Tays died on June 21, 1986, in Champaign, Illinois.
