= Doss Richerson =

William Joshua Doss Richerson (May 24, 1901 - 1976) was an athlete, with skills in shot put, discus, javelin, and football. He played for the American Football League, on the Chicago Bulls football team in the 1926 year.

Prior to playing professional football, Richerson played both football and competed on the track team for the University of Missouri. While at the school, Richerson set the Missouri Valley Conference records in both the shot put and discus events.

He was married to Kansas City, Missouri artist Modesta Pearl Dorset Richerson. Together, they had two children, Billy Doss Richerson and Vallie Jean Richerson Medlin.

Richerson's mother wrote a biography of the Richardson family of Texas, noting that she was born a Richardson, but had married into the Richerson family. In her book, she talks in length about her son's sports abilities in high school and college.

In 1976, Doss Richerson died of a blood clot to the brain after sustaining a head injury from a three-story fall from a building that he was painting.
