= Melrose Athletic Club =

USA football team

Melrose Athletic Club Atlantic City Shore Roses

General information
- Founded: 1921
- Folded: c1927
- Stadium: Bader Field (1921-1927)
- Headquartered: Atlantic City, New Jersey, United States
- Colors: Red, White

Personnel
- Owner: Melrose Athletic Club

Team history
- Melrose Athletic Club Atlantics (1921-1922); Atlantic City Roses (1923-c1927)

League / conference affiliations
- Independent (1921-1925, 1927); Eastern League of Professional Football (1926-1927)

The Melrose Athletic Club was a professional football team based in Atlantic City, New Jersey from 1921 until around 1927. The club which was also known as the Atlantic City Shore Roses and the Atlantic City Atlantics was arguably the most popular football team in New Jersey during the 1920s. Due to the team's location in Atlantic City, the Roses attracted several of the teams from the Anthracite League, based in Pennsylvania, as well as the Canton Bulldogs, Frankford Yellow Jackets, Pottsville Maroons and Rochester Jeffersons of the National Football League.

From 1926 until 1927 Melrose joined the Eastern League of Professional Football. The team would later return to the independent circuit after the league folded in 1927. During the 1927 season the Roses acquired many players from the now-defunct Philadelphia Quakers who were named American Football League a year earlier. Al Kruez and George Sullivan were in the Roses line-up for an October 2, 1927 game against the Staten Island Stapletons. The Roses lost the game 6-0 after a late fourth quarter fumble. Atlantic City's star of the game was end Whitey Thomas, another ex-Quaker, who caught four passes for 101 yards.

The team played all of its home games at Bader Field which was, and still is, a part of Atlantic City's airport.

The team disappeared after 1927; though no record is known to exist of them folding (not an uncommon occurrence among independent teams), teams that normally played them, such as the Bayonne Vikings and the Orange Tornadoes, suddenly stopped doing so, since no records of games against Atlantic City exist after 1927.
