= Larry Marks (American football) =

American football player (1902–1974)

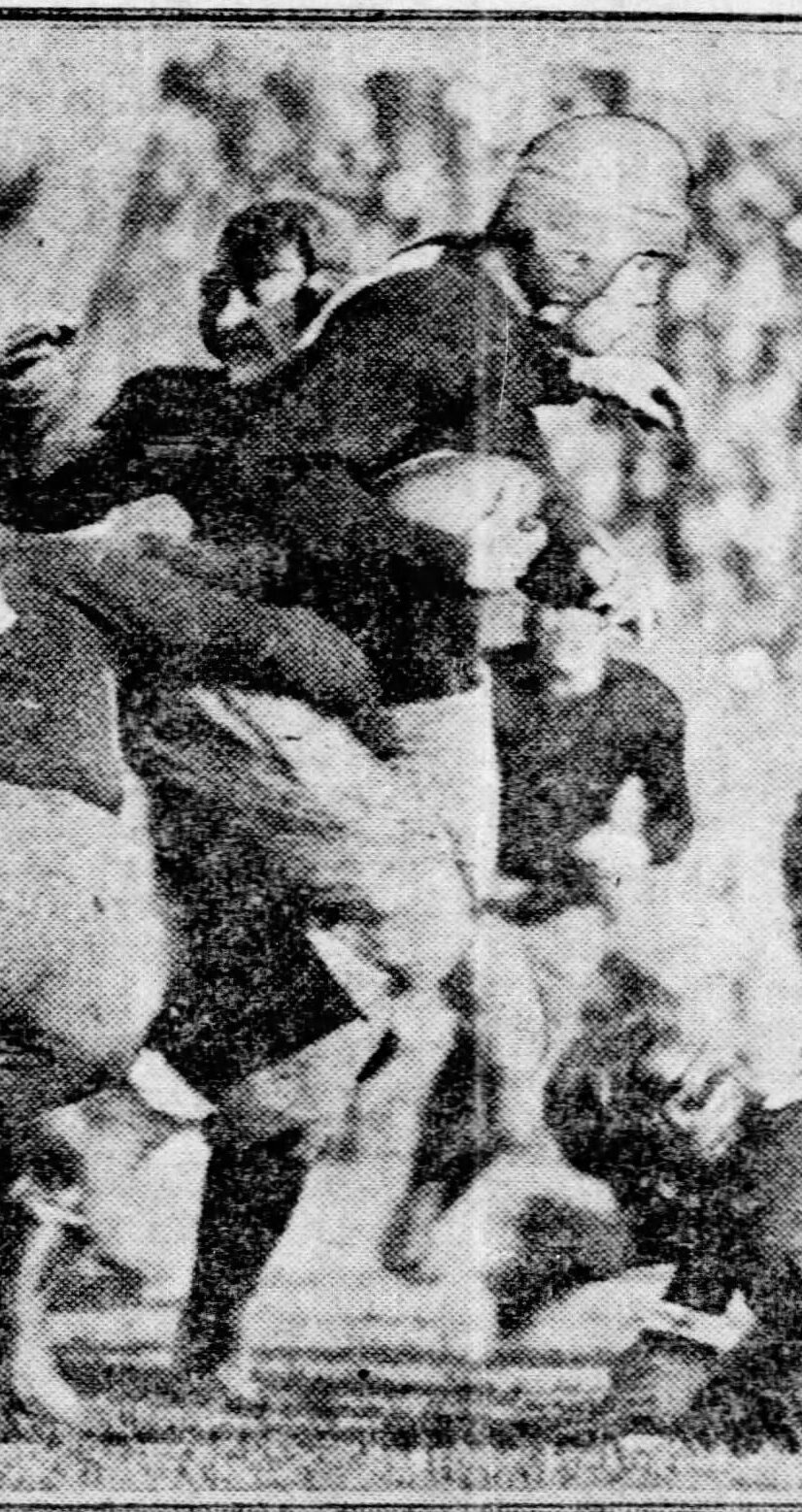

No. 44
- Position: Back

Personal information
- Born: December 20, 1902; Wabash, Indiana, U.S.
- Died: January 19, 1974 (aged 71); Kalamazoo, Michigan, U.S.
- Listed height: 5 ft 11 in (1.80 m)
- Listed weight: 185 lb (84 kg)

Career information
- High school: Wabash (Indiana)
- College: Indiana

Career history
- New York Yankees (NFL) (1927); Green Bay Packers (1928)

Career NFL statistics
- Games played: 24
- Touchdowns: 2
- Stats at Pro Football Reference

Lawrence Eugene Marks (December 20, 1902 – January 19, 1974) was a player in the National Football League. Marks played college football at the University of Indiana before playing for the New York Yankees (NFL) in 1927 and the Green Bay Packers in 1928.
