= Sam Whiteman (American football) =

American football player

Sam W. Whiteman (born September 29, 1901, date of death unknown) was an American football fullback/halfback in the first American Football League for the Chicago Bulls in 1926. Whiteman went to Richmond, Missouri High School and the University of Missouri where he was a 3-year letterman in football.
