= John Mohardt =

American football and baseball player (1898–1961)

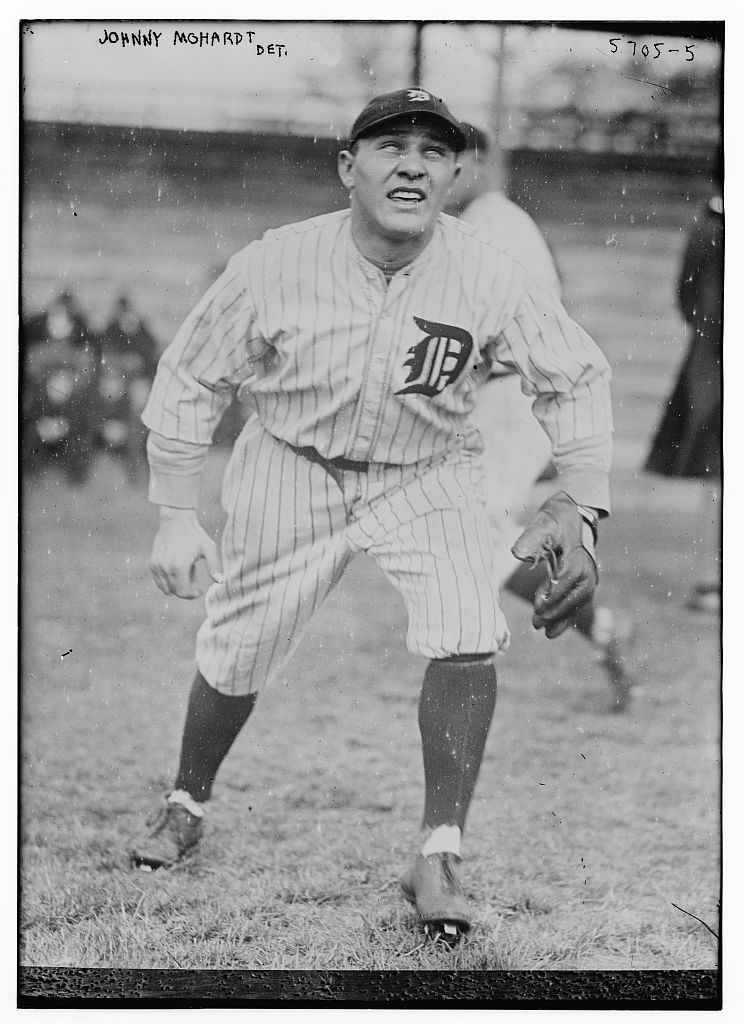
- Outfielder / Pinch runner
- Born: January 21, 1898; Pittsburgh, Pennsylvania, U.S.
- Died: November 24, 1961 (aged 63); La Jolla, California, U.S.
- Batted: Right Threw: Right

MLB debut
- April 15, 1922, for the Detroit Tigers

Last MLB appearance
- April 22, 1922, for the Detroit Tigers

MLB statistics
- Games played: 5
- At bats: 1
- Hits: 1
- Stats at Baseball Reference

Teams
- Baseball: Detroit Tigers (1922); Football: Chicago Cardinals (1922–1923); Racine Legion (1924); Chicago Bears (1925)

Career highlights and awards
- Second-team All-American (1921)

John Henry Mohardt (January 21, 1898 – November 24, 1961) was an American football and baseball player and medical doctor.

Mohardt attended the University of Notre Dame from 1918 through 1921 where he played football under Knute Rockne and also competed in baseball and track and field. He was selected as an All-American halfback in 1921 but lost his last year of collegiate eligibility for participating in a professional football game against the Green Bay Packers in December 1921.

Mohardt played professional baseball for the Detroit Tigers for five games in April 1922 and also played in the minor leagues during the 1922 and 1923 seasons. He also played professional football in the National Football League for four seasons with the Chicago Cardinals (1922–1923), Racine Legion (1924), and Chicago Bears (1925). He shared the backfield with Red Grange in 1925.

After retiring from athletics, Mohardt became a medical doctor. He served as a lieutenant colonel in the U.S. Army Medical Corps during World War II in the North African and Italian Campaigns. He later became a surgeon at a veterans hospital and eventually the assistant director of the Veterans Administration's Surgical Service.

== Early years ==
Mohardt was born in Pittsburgh, Pennsylvania, in January 1898. His family moved to Gary, Indiana, while he was a child. At the time of the 1920 U.S. Census, Mohardt was living in Gary with his parents and nine younger siblings. Both of his parents were immigrants from Austria, and his father worked as a pipe fitter in a sheet mill.

After the tenth grade, Mohardt dropped out to work in a local steel mill. He worked in the mill for two years before enrolling at the University of Notre Dame. According to Mohardt's son, Mohardt was given two tests by Notre Dame officials—running and throwing—which he passed and enrolled at Notre Dame in 1918 at age 20.

== Notre Dame ==
Mohardt attended the University of Notre Dame from 1918 to 1921. While there, he participated and received varsity letters in football, baseball, and track. He was both a pitcher and an outfielder at Notre Dame, compiled a batting average of almost .330 in three years of baseball, and was the captain of Notre Dame's 1921 baseball team. He also exhibited "an exceptional arm," had speed, and was a good fielder.

In football, he played halfback under coach Knute Rockne and was a teammate of George Gipp. Mohardt had "a powerful physique," though weighing only 160 pounds, and with the exception of a broken nose sustained in a football game in 1920, he was never seriously injured in three years of football at Notre Dame. Mohardt played in Gipp's shadow in 1919 and 1920, but became the team's star in 1921. Mohardt led the 1921 Notre Dame team to a 10-1 record with 781 rushing yards, 995 passing yards, 12 rushing touchdowns, and nine passing touchdowns. Grantland Rice wrote that "Mohardt could throw the ball to within a foot or two of any given space" and noted that the 1921 Notre Dame team "was the first team we know of to build its attack around a forward passing game, rather than use a forward passing game as a mere aid to the running game." Mohardt was selected as a first-team member of 1921 College Football All-America Team by Lawrence Perry and a second-team All-American by Walter Camp.

The authors of The Notre Dame Football Encyclopedia wrote of Mohardt:

Had he come along at another time or at another school, Mohardt might have gone down as one of the best college football players ever. His misfortune was that he played on some of the best Notre Dame teams in history and in the same backfield as the great George Gipp."

In early 1922, Mohardt lost his eligibility to continue playing for Notre Dame after it was discovered that he had played in a professional football game. He was initially alleged with joining other Notre Dame football players in participating in a game for the Carlinville, Illinois, football team in a professional game, but he denied doing so and claimed he was in class. He was subsequently charged with, and eventually admitted, playing for the Racine Legion team on December 4, 1921, in a professional game against the Green Bay Packers.

Mohardt also reportedly played semi-pro baseball in Iowa while attending Notre Dame during the summer of 1920, compiling a .309 batting average. While playing in Iowa, Mohardt is reported to have used the alias, John Cavanaugh, which was the name of the Catholic priest who was then the president of Notre Dame.

Mohardt was reported to be "one of the most brilliant students who has ever left Notre Dame."

== Professional baseball ==
Mohardt signed to play professional baseball for the Detroit Tigers in February 1922. He was also offered contracts from the five other major league teams and chose Detroit because they agreed that they would allow him to leave the team in the fall of 1922 to attend medical school.

Mohardt traveled to Augusta, Georgia, where he participated in Detroit's spring training. He made the regular season roster, but he appeared in only five games for the Tigers, making his debut on April 15, 1922, and playing in his final game seven days later. In two plate appearances, he had a single and a base on balls and scored two runs. In three appearances in the outfield, he had one putout and no errors. He left major league baseball with perfect 1.000 batting average and fielding percentage and two runs scored in his only two plate appearances.

With the Tigers having Ty Cobb, Harry Heilmann and Bobby Veach in the outfield, Mohardt was unlikely to get significant playing time. Accordingly, after a short stay in Detroit, manager Ty Cobb decided to send Mohardt to the minor leagues for seasoning. The Detroit Free Press noted: "Although Mohardt gives promise of developing into a great player, he isn't ready for regular assignment in the major leagues."

On April 26, 1922, Mohardt was assigned to the Denver Bears baseball team in the Western League. He subsequently appeared in 22 games for the Syracuse Stars in 1922, compiling a .185 batting average. He also played as a first baseman for the Greenville Spinners in the South Atlantic Conference in 1923. He appeared in 15 games for Greenville and compiled a .280 batting average.

== Professional football ==
Mohardt also played four years of professional football from 1922 to 1925. He was the starting right halfback for the Chicago Cardinals during the 1922 and 1923 seasons. In 1924, he played at the wingback position for the Racine Legion.

In 1925, Mohardt signed to play halfback for George Halas's Chicago Bears. After Mohardt signed with the Bears, the team also signed Red Grange. Grange began the season as the Bears' lead halfback, and Mohardt was relegated to a secondary role. During a game in Pittsburgh, Grange ruptured a blood vessel in his arm while throwing a block for Mohardt. Grange missed the remainder of the season, and Mohardt became the Bears' starting left halfback. On November 22, 1925, Mohardt scored the Bears' first touchdown in a 21–0 victory over the Green Bay Packers.

In 1926, Mohardt signed with the Chicago Bulls of the newly formed American Football League. On October 17, 1926, the Bulls played against the New York Yankees, an NFL team featuring Mohardt's former teammate, Red Grange. The game drew a crowd of 16,000 to the Bulls' home field. The first half ended in a scoreless tie, but Mohardt scored two touchdowns in the second half to lead the Bulls to a 14–0 victory over Grange and the Yankees.

== Later years ==
During the summers of 1923 and 1924, Mohardt attended the University of Wisconsin. He also played semi-pro baseball with the Madison Blues while attending Wisconsin. Mohardt subsequently attended Northwestern University Medical School and had a one-year internship at Chicago Mercy Hospital. In March 1928, he began a three-year fellowship in surgery at the Mayo Clinic. In April 1930, Mohard married Dorothy Ann Harrison in a ceremony in Rockford, Illinois.

Mohardt subsequently opened a private medical practice on Michigan Avenue in Chicago and became known as one of the leading brain specialists in the Midwest.

In January 1942, at age 43, and after the attack on Pearl Harbor, Mohardt closed his medical office on Michigan Avenue in Chicago and enlisted in the United States Army. While waiting to be called to active duty, Mohardt told a reporter he felt "just like he did when he sat on the bench and the late Knute Rockne sent him into his first college game." Mohardt served in the U.S. Army Medical Corps, attaining the rank of lieutenant colonel. He was assigned to the 12th General Hospital Unit and served there during the North African and Italian Campaigns. He later became a surgeon at a veterans hospital in Bayard, New Mexico, and eventually served as the assistant director of the Veterans Administration's Surgical Service.

After retiring, Mohardt moved to La Jolla, California. In November 1961, at age 63, Mohardt committed suicide at his home in La Jolla by severing the femoral artery in his groin. He was buried at the Fort Rosecrans National Cemetery in San Diego, California.
