= Bob Beattie (American football) =

American football player (1902–1983)

Profile
- Position: Tackle

Personal information
- Born: October 16, 1902; New York City
- Died: June 3, 1983 (aged 80); Orangeburg, New York

Career information
- College: Princeton

Career history
- Philadelphia Quakers (1926); New York Yankees (1927); Orange/Newark Tornadoes (1929–1930)

Awards and highlights
- First-team All-American (1924)

Career statistics
- Games played: 22
- Games started: 11

Robert Wetherson Beattie (October 16, 1902 – June 3, 1983) was an American professional football player who was a tackle in the American Football League (AFL) and the National Football League (NFL).

He played college football for the Princeton Tigers. Beattie played for the AFL's Philadelphia Quakers (1926) and the NFL's New York Yankees (1927) and Orange/Newark Tornadoes (1929–1930).
