= Marty Norton =

American football player (1901–1977)

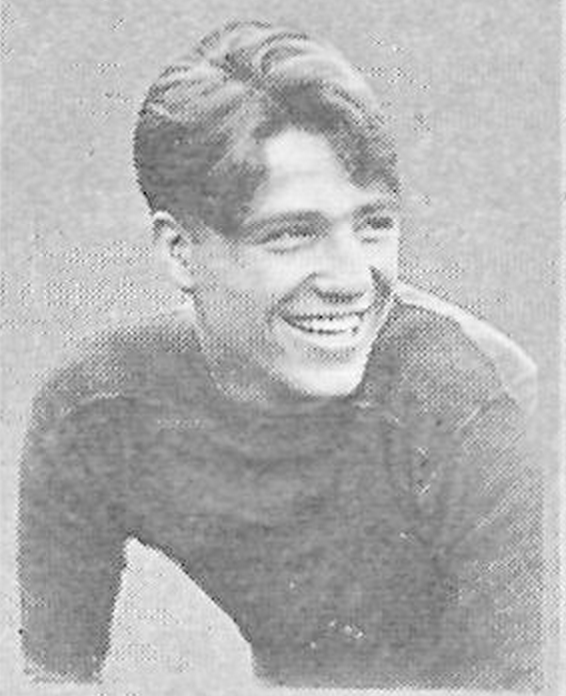
- High school yearbook photo, 1922

Profile
- Position: Back

Personal information
- Born: 1901–1907; Northern Minnesota, U.S.
- Died: October 8, 1977; Marin County, California, U.S.
- Listed height: 5 ft 6 in (1.68 m)
- Listed weight: 178 lb (81 kg)

Career information
- High school: Central (Minneapolis, Minnesota)
- College: Holy Cross (1922); Hamline (1922); DePaul (1924)

Career history

Playing
- Minneapolis Marines (1922, 1924); Ironwood Legion (1923); Green Bay Packers (1925); Rock Island Independents (1926)

Coaching
- Ripon (1925–1926) Basketball coach / assistant football coach / assistant track coach

Career NFL statistics
- Touchdowns: 10
- Stats at Pro Football Reference

Martin William Norton (né Muhvich; c. 1904 – October 8, 1977) was an American sportsman and convicted fraudster. Born in northern Minnesota, he was adopted by a family in Minneapolis who had noticed him running in the woods as a young boy. He became a top athlete and received varsity letters in six sports at Central High School in Minneapolis, serving as team captain in multiple sports and earning all-city honors in basketball and football. After playing for several basketball teams, Norton was very briefly enrolled at the College of the Holy Cross in Massachusetts, then attended Hamline University for a month.

After leaving Hamline, Norton joined the Minneapolis Marines of the National Football League (NFL), scoring two touchdowns during the 1922 NFL season. He played for the Ironwood Legion in 1923, then returned to the Minneapolis Marines in 1924, also briefly playing college football for the DePaul Blue Demons in the same season. In 1925, Norton became a coach at Ripon College in Wisconsin and also played for the Green Bay Packers, finishing as their leading scorer that season and the NFL leader in receiving touchdowns. He played for the Rock Island Independents of the American Football League (AFL) in 1926 at the end of his professional football career. During this time, and through 1930, he also played for several independent basketball teams and was regarded as one of the top basketball players in the northwest.

Norton retired from sports due to low salaries and began selling magazines. He was arrested and imprisoned numerous times over the next two decades, starting in 1928. He often sold fake magazine subscriptions, sometimes under many different aliases, to school teachers with the intention of keeping the money for himself. He was jailed in 1931, escaped, was jailed again and then escaped once more before being caught one year later after a nationwide search. After a parole in 1933, he resumed selling fake magazines and was sentenced to 10 years imprisonment in 1934 for forgery.

While serving that sentence, Norton was credited with saving the life of a prison guard and was paroled again in 1936. However, he was jailed at the end of the year, and after being released, violated the conditions of his parole and was sent back to jail. Norton was released from prison in 1940 and continued his fraudulent magazine sales, being wanted in five states by the end of the year. After another jail sentence, he returned to the same activities around 1946 and received a seven-year sentence in 1947. After finishing that sentence, not much was reported on Norton until his death in 1977.

== Early life ==
Norton was born to Joseph Muhvich, an Austrian lumberman, and a Hungarian gypsy mother. His birth date is uncertain: according to Pro Football Archives, he was born on November 11, 1901, in Ely, Minnesota, while Pro Football Reference records him to have been born on March 17, 1905. A 1920 article in The Minneapolis Journal listed his place of birth as Hunter Island, Canada, and gave an age that would have had him born in 1902 or 1903. The Courier, Green Bay Press-Gazette, and Neenah News-Record each gave ages that would have dated his birth to 1901/1902, 1902/1903, and 1906/1907, respectively.

Norton's parents took poor care of him; according to The Des Moines Register, "Marty didn't know what a home was [and] had no opportunity for education". His mother often wandered and eventually died from alcoholism. At age eight, he was adopted by Mr. and Mrs. W. I. Norton, a couple in Minneapolis. According to later testimony at a parole board meeting by a woman who knew the family:

The Nortons had big lumber interests in northern Minnesota and one day (while inspecting them), they found a little boy of 8 years running wild in the woods. By much patience and cookies, they got near him ... The Nortons took Marty to Minneapolis where they finally persuaded him to sleep IN the bed and not UNDER it. Of course he did not know the meaning of affection or love, as the first time Mrs. Norton tried to kiss him, he jumped down behind the bed and said: "Don't ever do that again! No one ever did that to me." She said, "All right, Marty, I won't kiss you again but I want to love you." It was almost two years later that he came home with a good report card and she said, "I am proud of you," and he came over to her and kissed her.

== High school ==
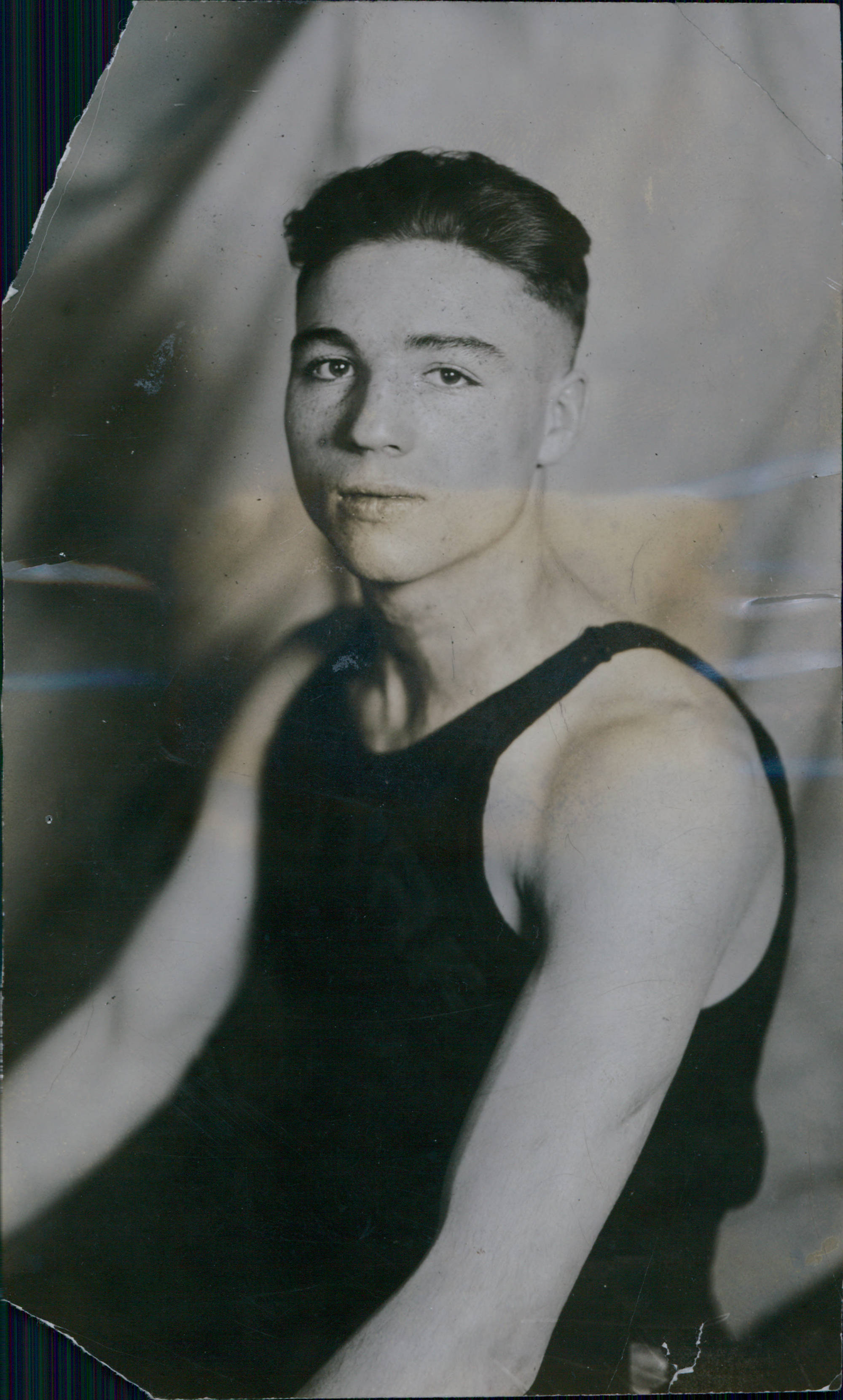
Norton on Central's basketball team

Norton grew up playing sports, being a top baseball catcher at Bryant grade school in 1916 and 1917. He then attended Central High School in Minneapolis where he was a standout athlete. He competed in football, basketball, track and field, cross country, tennis and baseball. He was considered Central's first star basketball player and served as team captain in football, basketball and tennis, receiving 18 total varsity letters.

Norton won his first letter at Central in the spring of 1918 in cross country. He was the top high school cross country athlete in the city at the time and won two notable competitions. He also excelled in track and field, participating in middle-distance running events and the pole vault. In football, Norton was as an end and first played in 1918 before becoming a starter in 1919. He was described by The Minneapolis Journal as "fast and aggressive [with] an unusually brainy game" in football. In basketball, Norton played as a forward and guard, becoming the scoring leader for the 1918–19 team and then being elected captain for the 1919–20 season as a junior. He was named all-city in basketball in 1918–19 and repeated in 1919–20 (being chosen captain of the all-city team). This was the same year that he led Central to the city and Twin Cities championships and a fourth-place finish at a national tournament. He was selected to a national all-star team and received praise from college basketball coach Harlan Page, who sent Norton a letter congratulating him for his "unusual ability to alter his speed while dribbling down the floor ... one of the most difficult [feats] known to basketball".

Norton was re-elected captain for his senior basketball season. He also played as a quarterback and halfback in the 1920 football season, with his play in one game being described by the Star Tribune as the most "brilliant" performance of any high school athlete that year. Norton was chosen captain of the 1921 football team following the 1920 season. He was named captain of the all-city basketball team after the 1920–21 season as well as chosen all-state, and he was also an all-city pick in his last two football seasons. He helped the 1920–21 basketball team to a state championship, the only one in the history of Central. In the summer, he lived in Hibbing, Minnesota, declaring his intention to attend Hibbing High School for his last year. He was a member of the football team for one day before he "threatened to disorganize the entire local eleven and his services were dispensed with". Afterwards, Norton returned to the football team at Central.

In addition to his successes in football, basketball, track and cross country, Norton was his school's second-best tennis player. He also competed as an amateur boxer and was a talented swimmer. Central coach Weston Mitchell called Norton the most talented all-around athlete he had ever seen, while The Minneapolis Journal described him as "one of the most brilliant all-around athletes ever developed in the local schools". By the 1930s, he was considered the greatest athlete to come from a school in Minneapolis. In 1936, Cedric Adams of The Minneapolis Star, in declaring him the all-time greatest high school athlete in the area, described him as having "a certain primitive, savage quality that made him a flash on the basketball floor, the fleetest of track stars [and] one of the most formidable of gridiron warriors." Norton graduated from Central in December 1921.

== College and professional career ==
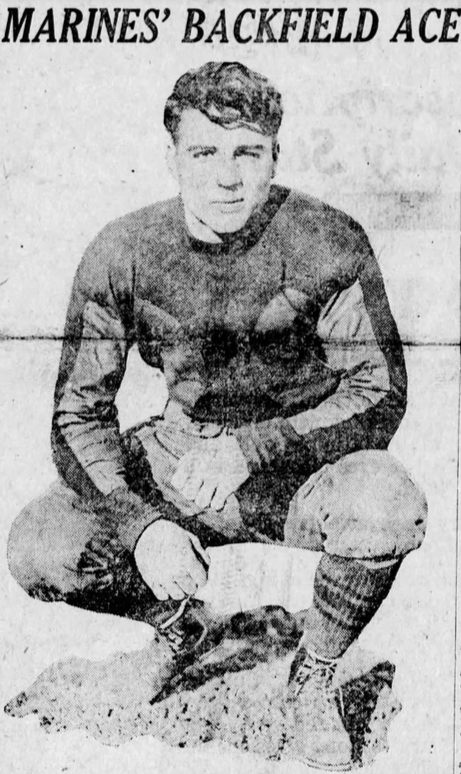
Norton with the Minneapolis Marines

=== 1921–1923 ===
After finishing high school, Norton signed to play with the St. Stephens basketball team as a forward. He played with several basketball teams during the 1921–22 season, including the 151st Artillery team, Ballentine Post, Hennepin-Lake, the St. Paul Kaysees and Waldron Globe Trotters. At the start of September 1922, it was announced that Norton planned on attending the College of the Holy Cross in Worcester, Massachusetts. After he had joined the football team, it was discovered Norton lacked the Latin credits required by Holy Cross, and he had to leave the school. He enrolled at Hamline University instead, and joined the Hamline Pipers team.

However, within a month, Norton left Hamline and joined the Minneapolis Marines of the National Football League (NFL) in October 1922. He made his NFL debut on October 22 in a loss to the Chicago Cardinals, starting for the Marines at right halfback. He was reported as one of the team's "stars" in their subsequent non-league win against the Duluth Kelleys. Against Jim Thorpe's Oorang Indians the following week, he had his best game of the season, scoring two touchdowns in a 13–6 win. The Green Bay Press-Gazette described him as the "big star" of the game and called him a "good ground gainer ... a good tackler and a dandy kicker and interference man". The Winona Daily News reported that he "dazzled" the Indians with "an exhibition of open field and end running seldom seen on the gridiron". Afterwards, the Marines concluded their NFL campaign with a 14–6 loss to the Green Bay Packers; despite the loss, Norton was mentioned in The Post-Crescent as having played "a whale of a game". He finished the NFL season with three games played, all starts, and two touchdowns as the Marines went 1–3 in league play. Norton also played in the Marines' games after the NFL season, scoring an extra point in a win against the Omaha Olympics and both a touchdown and an extra point in a win against the University All-Stars.

Norton re-signed with the Waldron Globe Trotters (or Minneapolis Globe Trotters) for the 1922–23 basketball season. He was one of the top basketball players in the northwest and served as the Globe Trotters captain. In the 1923 football season, he was released by the Marines and signed to play with the Ironwood Legion as a quarterback. He was one of their top-performing backs and at the same time, Norton attended DePaul University in Chicago, Illinois, playing for the DePaul Blue Demons football team. The Star Tribune called him the "most consistent gainer" with DePaul and noted that "Long before the season was over he was hailed as one of the best men ever to perform in a DePaul uniform, his versatility placing him in the first rank of the Catholic conference".

=== 1924–1930 ===
After the football season, Norton joined the Muscatine Elks (or Muskies) in Iowa for the 1923–24 basketball season. He was dubbed the "Wonder Man of the Northwest" for his basketball abilities. Norton was used as a forward by Muscatine and according to The Des Moines Register was considered "probably the best" player in that section of the U.S. He also briefly played for the DePaul Blue Demons basketball team in 1923–24 as a "star" forward before he was declared ineligible. The DePaul team eventually won the conference championship. At Muscatine, the team aimed for the title of world champions, but after a loss to the Globe Trotters where Norton played poorly, they both released him and then disbanded. After his release, he concluded the season with the 151st Field Artillery team.

In July 1924, Norton re-signed to play with the Minneapolis Marines while also announcing his intention to enroll at the University of Minnesota, with his money earned from the Marines to pay for his education. During this time, he also coached the Ascher Nicollet-Lake Merchants amateur football team. He was one of the leading players for the Marines in the 1924 season, with Green Bay Packers coach Curly Lambeau calling him one of the best backs in the country. Considered their most consistent running back, he appeared in all six of the Marines' NFL games, four as a starter, and scored two touchdowns; the Marines lost all six. Norton later re-signed with the Globe Trotters for the subsequent basketball season, also playing with the 151st Artillery team and the Minneapolis Whiz Bangs, which he captained. His Whiz Bangs team was described as "one of the classiest traveling basketball organizations in the country".

In August 1925, Norton was hired as head basketball coach and assistant football and track and field coach at Ripon College in Wisconsin. He also joined the Green Bay Packers for the 1925 NFL season. He scored a touchdown in a pre-season win against non-league Iron Mountain. In early October, he "narrowly escaped death" after the Buick he was driving smashed into a concrete post, wrecking the car beyond repair but leaving Norton with only mild injuries and a two-inch cut on his chin. The following day, he refereed a high school football game, and the day after that, had his first start as a Packer, scoring three touchdowns (one rushing, two receiving) in a 31–0 victory against the Milwaukee Badgers after insisting he wanted to play. The Green Bay Press-Gazette reported that he "cut loose with a few capers that would put Red Grange to shame" and said that he "gave as good an exhibition of open field running as has ever been seen on a Green Bay gridiron ... Norton was as slippery as an eel and he simply 'wormed' his way around through, over and under the husky Milwaukeeans." The following week, he caught a touchdown pass in a win against the Rock Island Independents, and he then scored twice in a win over the Rochester Jeffersons – one being a receiving touchdown of over 60 yards and the other being a 65-yard interception return. Norton left the team prior to the last game of the season due to an ankle injury. He finished the season having appeared in 10 games, seven as a starter, helping the Packers compile a record of 8–5. With 36 points, he led the Packers in scoring, setting a new team-record for points in a season. He also was tied for the NFL lead in receiving touchdowns with four, becoming the first Packer to lead the league in that category.

After football season, Norton coached the basketball team at Ripon and played for a team in Appleton as well as for the 151st team. In September 1926, he signed with the Rock Island Independents of the American Football League (AFL). He ran for one touchdown with the Independents but was limited by injury and finished with only four games played, all starts. He continued playing basketball in 1926–27 with the "Whiz Bang Globe Trotters", leading them on a tour through the eastern U.S. where they compiled a record of 16–4. He remained with them in 1927–28, as they were renamed the "Fat Emma's". By 1928, he was still considered one of the top forwards in the country and one of the most accurate long-distance shooters. Norton played with 151st in 1928–29 and with the Globe Trotters and Buffalo Lincolns in 1929–30. During his basketball career, he was also a member of the Denver Tigers and the Chicago Big Five.

During his career, Norton weighed 160 pounds (73 kg) and stood at 5 feet 6 inches (1.68 m); nevertheless he was considered "fast and tough as nails", according to The Des Moines Register. He played with many famous players during his career, including Red Grange, Duke Slater, Elmer Layden and Fritz Crisler. In total, he appeared in 19 NFL games, 14 as a starter, recording 10 touchdowns (five rushing, four receiving, one interception return) for a total of 60 points. The Stevens Point Journal described his talents as similar to Red Grange, but reported that he would never be as widely known due to his limited experience in college football.

== Legal issues ==
=== First arrest ===
Norton earned up to $500 per game during his football career and up to $275 per game during his basketball career. In his last seasons, the value of his contracts began to dwindle, and he thus left sports to begin selling magazines, which resulted in many legal issues over the next years of his life. He later explained to a parole board: "It is poor policy to follow a professional athletic career. It's easy come, easy go. When you're through your future is but a shadow". However, he also said that his work for magazines degraded his character:

I soon lost the profits of my personality – they were merely tiny units which together composed a shapeless, jelly-like mass. My chief characteristic was apathy. The magazine managers betrayed me by teaching me high pressure salesmanship. Not making any money, my morale was at a low ebb, for self respect had flown and I thought I had to have money. I was like the horse which ran up against a stone wall not because it was blind but because it just didn't give a damn.

In December 1927, Norton was arrested and accused of "victimizing school teachers in Florence and Forest counties by posing as a magazine salesman and canvasser for educational publications". As he was about to be taken for trial, he requested to be allowed to drive there himself, which was granted. He then "suddenly made a sharp turn up a side road", left his car and escaped, later being discovered in his hometown of Minneapolis. He was arrested again and extradited to Florence County, where he admitted in court that he intended on keeping the money he obtained from offering magazine subscriptions. He pleaded guilty to receiving money under false pretenses and was fined $1 and costs totaling about $250, in addition to being ordered to make restitution.

=== 1931 arrest and prison escapes ===
By 1930, Norton was continuing to sell magazines in Nebraska, often under different aliases including "George Besnah"; he was known to have used as many as seven. He was wanted in several counties of the state after many subscribers to his "magazines" failed to ever receive them. He extensively targeted school teachers in his selling of fake magazine subscriptions, often focusing on those who were newly hired, since he knew that "there are several magazines which school teachers take sooner or later – magazines dealing with children's activities". According to The Des Moines Register, "By innuendo, he conveys the idea he is attending the same teachers college the teacher went to, makes general conversation, and then starts talking magazines. The fact that a teacher had no money with her would not stop him. If everything else failed, he would tell the teacher to write out a check and leave the money at a bank at her convenience".

The Beatrice Daily Sun described "Besnah" as an "eccentric magazine salesman" and reported him to have caused a "reign of terror" targeting teachers in Gage County, Nebraska, during the fall of 1930, followed by other similar activities in nearby counties. In his efforts, he posed under several different identities, once claiming to be a state inspector and taking over school classes and another time pretending to be a student writing a thesis on education. Following a search that took several months, he was arrested in March 1931 for "unlawful soliciting" and fined $100, spending time at the jail in Seward while waiting to be picked up by the sheriff of York.

In early April, he managed to escape with the help of accomplices. The sheriff reported that a man called pretending to be a deputy sheriff from Holdrege and later arrived at the jail, wearing an officer's uniform. As soon as the man arrived, the sheriff received a fake call about a nearby robbery and left to address it. During this time, the pretend deputy sheriff – Norton's accomplice – freed him and left a note that Norton had been "given into custody of officers from another county", which was later discovered to be false. His escape was subsequently investigated by Nebraska Attorney General Christian A. Sorensen and efforts then were launched to recapture him. He was also charged with jailbreaking during this time.

In May 1931, Norton was arrested in Webster, South Dakota, on the same charge of unlawful soliciting, and later returned to Nebraska. He faced one to ten years in prison for his jailbreaking charges. He was held in a jail cell in York before escaping a second time in July. After his escape, he traveled to Iowa and called the sheriff from York, saying that he would help "find those fellows", referring to two other prisoners who had been incarcerated with him back in April and had also escaped. According to the Lincoln Journal Star, their conversation went as follows:

Norton: "Hello, Sheriff Carter."
Carter: "Yes?"
Norton: "This is Besnah speaking."
Carter: "Who?"
Norton: "Besnah – George Besnah."
Carter: "Where are you?"
Norton: "I'm over here in Iowa. I'm going into Cleveland and try to find those fellows to help me. I'll bring them back in a few days."
Carter: "How did you get out of jail?"
Norton: "Oh, I just picked the lock last night and walked out. I got tired of rotting in jail and decided to work on this myself."
Carter: "Well, I'll be damned."

=== 1932–1936: Imprisonments and parole ===
A nationwide search was conducted, but Norton went missing and was not found until June 1932, when he was arrested in Duluth, Minnesota, then returned to Nebraska. He pleaded guilty to jailbreaking and was sentenced from one to five years in prison at the Nebraska State Penitentiary. In July 1933, the state pardon board announced he was to be paroled. Afterwards, he returned to selling magazines, earning an average of $800 per month. In February 1934, he sold his magazine subscriptions to teachers in Iowa, falsely claiming to be operating under the approval of county superintendent E. D. Bradley. By that time, he was wanted in several different counties in Iowa for various charges including forgery, the sale of his "bogus magazine subscriptions", and illegal possession of liquor. He was arrested on illegal liquor possession charges, then jailed after being convicted for his magazine sales. He then received an additional sentence – 10 years – for forging a $4 check against a teacher in Mount Pleasant, being sentenced to complete his sentence at Anamosa State Penitentiary. He went on to hold that the forgery charge was wrong, telling a newspaper in 1936 that "It was my word against the school teacher's: that's all. But the charge was ridiculous and still is."

In January 1936, while serving his sentence, Norton saw a prison guard killed after being thrown over a railing by an inmate. The inmate was about to do the same to another guard, but Norton grabbed the inmate and stopped him, saving the guard's life. For his actions, the Iowa board of control requested he be rewarded, resulting in the parole board allowing him to be paroled in June. After being released from prison, he took a job as a house painter in Cedar Rapids, Iowa, earning $76 in his first month. He made $100 in July but his employer was imprisoned and thus became unable to pay him further wages. In August, Norton began legitimately selling magazines, earning $163 while telling the parole board that his surroundings were "wonderful and the future looks great".

The following month, Norton received permission to move to Minnesota, where he earned $488 in his first month and $660 in October. By this time, he was attending "political rallies and Big Ten football games". However, in November, four counties issued arrest warrants for the misdemeanor of canvassing on public school grounds. He was arrested near the end of the month after an automobile chase. He paid fines to several counties in December but was held in jail at Austin on another charge of forgery. Eventually, with the help of Iowa parole agent Frank Kearney Jr., Norton was proven innocent regarding the forgery charge and was allowed to stay on parole. In December, he told The Des Moines Register that he realized:

The magazine selling business is a bad thing for me, especially cause when I start making money, I seem to want more and more. I'm grasping all the time. But I'm through with it. I'll be glad to go to work on a farm for board and room. I don't want big money. I'm happier without it and a damned sight better off.

=== Later returns to prison ===
In January 1937, Norton was wanted again after violating the conditions of his parole and arrested in Madison, Wisconsin. After his arrest, he was taken by Kearney back to prison in Iowa. He completed his prison tenure at the Iowa State Penitentiary in Fort Madison before being released on January 3, 1940. He then resumed his criminal activities in multiple states. By the end of the year, he was wanted in Iowa, Nebraska, Wisconsin, Minnesota and Kansas on forgery charges and in Nebraska on false vehicle registration charges. He defrauded over 100 teachers in Iowa during the year while posing as a college student writing a thesis, claiming that the teachers' purchases of his magazines would help him pay the costs of attending school. His wife, Joan, assisted him in defrauding teachers before being jailed in July 1940; he then abandoned her. After Joan was released from jail, she committed several more crimes over the subsequent years and returned to jail, where she attempted suicide multiple times.

In December 1940, Norton was captured and imprisoned for 30 days in Hartington for his magazine sales. He was also prosecuted at the federal level for using the mail to defraud. He was later imprisoned at Omaha before moving to Dubuque, after which he was released on bond in January 1941. After being released, he failed to appear in court when requested. He surrendered to a U.S. Marshal in May after being indicted by a federal grand jury, then received a sentence of 18 months in a federal reformatory. He served his sentence at the Federal Correctional Institution, Sandstone, in Minnesota, and also for a time at Fort Leavenworth in Kansas.

By 1946, after being freed, Norton returned to selling fake magazine subscriptions to teachers in Iowa. He was arrested in January 1947, and by that time had charges in several different counties, including four for larceny by trick and another for obtaining money under false pretenses. He was held in the jail at Omaha and later was charged with forgery in March. Norton was then sentenced to seven years in the state penitentiary by a Hardin County district court judge in May 1947.

Norton later died on October 8, 1977, in Marin County, California, according to Pro Football Archives.
