= George Sullivan (American football, born 1897) =

American football player (1897–1989)

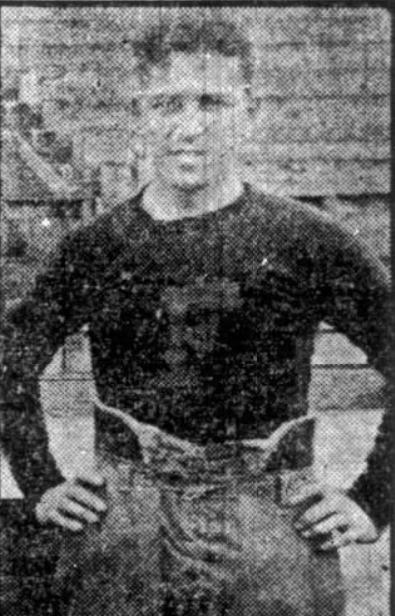

No. 16, 4
- Position: Back

Personal information
- Born: March 15, 1897; Baldwinsville, New York, U.S.
- Died: July 5, 1989 (aged 92); Woodbury, New Jersey, U.S.
- Listed height: 5 ft 9 in (1.75 m)
- Listed weight: 170 lb (77 kg)

Career information
- High school: Cortland (Cortland, New York)
- College: Pennsylvania

Career history
- Frankford Yellow Jackets (1924–1925); Philadelphia Quakers (1926); Atlantic City Roses (1927)
- Stats at Pro Football Reference

George Henry Sullivan (March 15, 1897 – July 5, 1989) was an American football back who played two seasons with the Frankford Yellow Jackets of the National Football League (NFL). He played college football at the University of Pennsylvania. He was also a member of the Philadelphia Quakers and Atlantic City Roses.

== Early life ==
George Henry Sullivan was born on March 15, 1897 in Baldwinsville, New York. He attended Cortland High School in Cortland, New York.

== Professional career ==
=== Frankford Yellow Jackets ===
Sullivan played in 22 games, starting twelve, for the Frankford Yellow Jackets from 1924 to 1925.

=== Philadelphia Quakers ===
Sullivan played in eight games, starting six, for the Philadelphia Quakers of the American Football League during the 1926 season. The AFL folded after the 1926 season.

=== Atlantic City Roses ===
Sullivan signed with the Atlantic City Roses of the Eastern League of Professional Football in 1927.

== Personal life ==
Sullivan died on July 5, 1989, in Woodbury, New Jersey, at the age of 92.
