= New York Yanks =

National Football League team

New York Yanks / Bulldogs
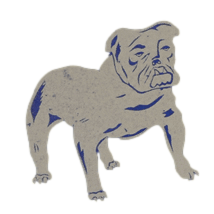
Logo

General information
- Founded: 1949
- Stadium: Polo Grounds (1949); Yankee Stadium (1950–1951)
- Headquartered: New York City
- Colors: Royal blue, silver, white

Personnel
- Owner: Ted Collins
- Head coach: Charley Ewart (1949); Red Strader (1950); Jimmy Phelan (1951)

Team history
- New York Bulldogs (1949); New York Yanks (1950–1951)

League / conference affiliations
- National Football League

The New York Yanks were an American football team that played in the National Football League under that name in the 1950 and 1951 seasons.

== Season-by-season overview ==
=== 1949 ===
The team began in 1944 as the Boston Yanks and were owned by Kate Smith's manager Ted Collins. He wanted a team in New York City, but the New York Giants refused to allow his new team to share the New York market.

In 1949, Collins suspected that the All-America Football Conference was near collapse and received permission to move the Yanks to New York. Rather than executing a formal relocation, Collins returned his Boston franchise to the NFL and was issued a new team for New York, most likely as a tax write-off. This new team played as the New York Bulldogs and shared the Polo Grounds with the Giants during the 1949 season.

The 1949 Bulldogs were a disaster on the field (1–10–1) as well as at the box office, drawing just 48,007 fans to their six home games, with the largest crowd (17,704) appearing for a game against the Giants.

The October 30 13–13 tie against the Washington Redskins drew only 3,678 spectators, the lowest attendance at a non-neutral site NFL game since 1939 (excluding 2020, when the COVID-19 pandemic severely limited attendance).

=== 1950 ===
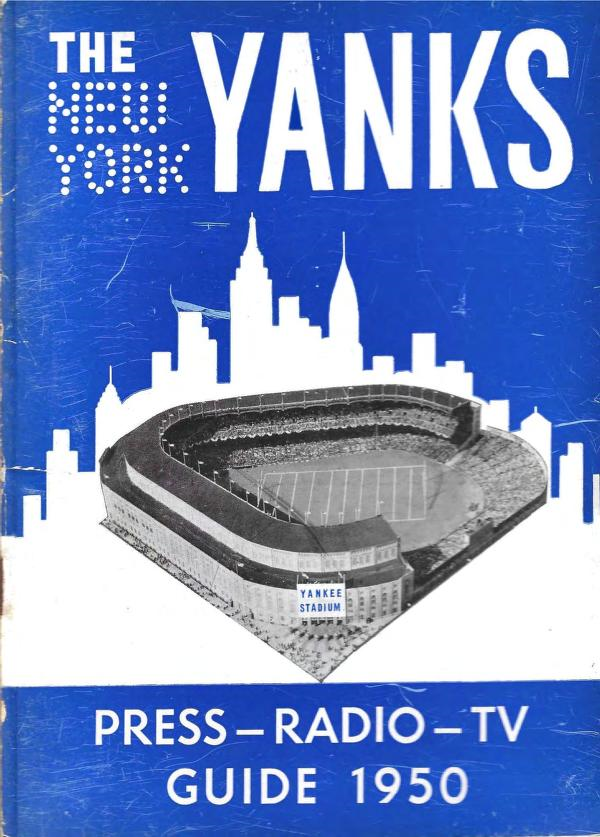
1950 media guide showing the team's new home, Yankee Stadium

In 1950, Collins changed his franchise's name to the New York Yanks and moved to Yankee Stadium, essentially merging the woeful Bulldogs with the New York Yankees of the defunct AAFC as part of a deal in which he bought the rights to most of the Yankees' players. (Eighteen players from the 1949 Yankees played for the Yanks in 1950, while only four players from the 1949 Bulldogs—Joe Domnanovich, Joe Golding, John Nolan and John Rauch—returned.)

After splitting their first two games, the Yanks won five consecutive games, scoring 190 points during the streak, and led the NFL's new National Conference with a 6–1 record. The team's quarterback was George Ratterman, whom the Yanks had acquired after his old team, the Buffalo Bills, was not included in the NFL-AAFC merger. Attendance improved as well; after attracting barely 30,000 to their first three home games (all Yanks victories), 48,642 spectators attended the next home game against Chicago, followed by 42,673 against the Rams. However, a porous defense contributed to a four-game losing streak that eliminated the Yanks from playoff contention. A win over the expiring Baltimore franchise (playing its last game) improved the Yanks' final record to 7–5, a third-place finish.

=== 1951 ===
The 1951 Yanks had two future Hall of Fame linemen, Art Donovan and Mike McCormack.

The team's landlord, the baseball Yankees, won the American League pennant and would not allow the field to be used for football during the 1951 World Series. The Yanks were forced to move their first two home games to Los Angeles and Detroit, both of which were blowout losses. Their next five games, four of which were on the road, resulted in four losses by a total of 16 points and one tie. The only home game during that stretch, a 29–27 loss to the Green Bay Packers, drew just 7,351 fans.

The Yanks finished the 1951 season with only one victory, a 31–28 win in their road game against Green Bay. Their final game at Yankee Stadium against the Giants was played on an icy field with a temperature of 17 °F (−8 °C) and attracted only 6,658 spectators.

The Yanks lost 27–17 to finish their season at 1–9–2 and last place in the league. Of the Yanks' 12 games during the season, only four were played at home.

=== Season-by-season record ===
	Year	W	L	T	Finish	Coach
Bulldogs	1949	1	10	1	5th East	Charley Ewart
Yanks	1950	7	5	0	3rd National	Red Strader
Yanks	1951	1	9	2	6th National	Jimmy Phelan

Yanks Total: 8 - 14 - 2

== Decline and dissolution ==
After only 37,268 people attended the team's four home games in 1951 (three losses and a tie), Collins reportedly sold the Yanks back to the league following the season, but it is more likely that the franchise was simply canceled by the NFL. Shortly thereafter, a group of Dallas businessmen was nominally awarded a new franchise, the Dallas Texans. However, the Dallas group acquired the Yanks' player contracts and began play at the Cotton Bowl. That franchise failed after only one season, and the remains were awarded to a Baltimore-based group that used it to start the new Baltimore Colts.

However, the NFL and the current Colts organization (which relocated to Indianapolis in 1984) do not consider the Colts to be a continuation of the New York Yanks or of any other franchise.

== First-round draft selections ==
New York Yanks / Bulldogs first-round draft picks
Year	Player name	Position	College
1949	Doak Walker	Back	SMU
1950	None		
1951	None		

== Pro Football Hall of Famers ==
New York Yanks / Bulldogs Hall of Famers
Players
No.	Name	Position	Tenure	Inducted
22	Bobby Layne	QB/K	1949	1967
39	Art Donovan	DT	1951	1968
71	Mike McCormack	OT	1951	1984

== Notable players ==
- Bob DeMoss
- Brad Ecklund
- George Ratterman
- Spec Sanders
- George Taliaferro
- Art Weiner
- Buddy Young
