= Century Milstead =

American football player (1901–1963)

Profile
- Position: Tackle

Personal information
- Born: January 1, 1901; Allegheny, Pennsylvania, U.S.
- Died: June 2, 1963 (aged 62); Pleasantville, New York, U.S.

Career information
- College: Yale

Career history
- 1925: New York Giants
- 1926: Philadelphia Quakers
- 1927–1928: New York Giants

Awards and highlights
- NFL champion (1927); AFL champion (1926); Consensus All-American (1923)
- College Football Hall of Fame

Century Allen "Wally" Milstead (January 1, 1901 – June 2, 1963) was an American professional football player in the National Football League (NFL) and American Football League (AFL). He played college football at Wabash College and at Yale University, where his play earned him All-American recognition. On his way from Wabash to Yale in early 1922, he attended Syracuse University where he was the heavyweight starter for the Orangemen wrestling team. Milstead went on to play with the professional Philadelphia Quakers of the AFL and the New York Giants of the NFL. He got his name for being born on the first day of the twentieth century, January 1, 1901. Milstead was inducted into the College Football Hall of Fame in 1977.

He also spent time as a professional wrestler.

== See also ==
- List of gridiron football players who became professional wrestlers
