= Adrian Ford =

American football player (1904–1977)

Profile
- Positions: End, Guard, Fullback, Halfback, Quarterback

Personal information
- Born: January 1, 1904; Youngstown, Ohio, United States
- Died: July 7, 1977 (aged 73); Youngstown, Ohio, United States
- Listed height: 5 ft 10 in (1.78 m)
- Listed weight: 190 lb (86 kg)

Career information
- College: Lafayette

Career history
- 1926: Philadelphia Quakers (AFL)
- 1927: Frankford Yellow Jackets (NFL)
- 1927: Pottsville Maroons (NFL)

Awards and highlights
- AFL Champion (1926)

Adrian Grainger Ford (January 1, 1904 – July 7, 1977) was a professional football player from Youngstown, Ohio. After going attending high school in Niles, Ohio; Ford attended and played college football for Lafayette College. He made his professional debut in the first American Football League, formed by Red Grange, in 1926 with the Philadelphia Quakers. He won the 1926 AFL Championship with the Quakers. After the AFL folded, the following year, Ford moved to the National Football League. During his only year of playing in the league, Ford split the 1927 season between the Frankford Yellow Jackets and the Pottsville Maroons. He scored two touchdowns for Frankford during the season.
