= Dick Romey =

American football player (1905–1980)

Profile
- Position: Center

Personal information
- Born: March 12, 1905; Iowa
- Died: July 16, 1980 (aged 75); Mason City, Iowa
- Listed height: 6 ft 1 in (1.85 m)
- Listed weight: 186 lb (84 kg)

Career information
- High school: Mason City
- College: Iowa

Career history
- Chicago Bulls (1926)

Awards and highlights
- Second-team All-Big Ten (1925)

Richard E. Romey (March 12, 1905 – July 16, 1980) was an American football player. He played professionally at the end position for the Chicago Bulls of the first American Football League in 1926. Prior to his professional career, Romey played college football at the University of Iowa.

== Education ==
Richard E. Romey studied at Mason City High School in Iowa, before joining the University of Iowa. He played American football while at both schools.

== Career ==
In 1926, Romey signed with the Chicago Bulls.
