= Joe Marhefka =

American football player (1902–2003)

Profile
- Position: HB

Personal information
- Born: February 16, 1902; Phillipsburg, New Jersey, United States
- Died: June 30, 2003 (aged 101); Easton, Pennsylvania, United States

Career information
- College: Lafayette College

Career history
- 1924–1925: Pottsville Maroons
- 1926: Philadelphia Quakers

Joseph Cyril Marhefka (February 16, 1902 – June 30, 2003) was an American professional football player who played halfback for the Pottsville Maroons and the Philadelphia Quakers. A native of Phillipsburg, New Jersey, he was recruited to Lafayette College, where he played on their football team for four years. He then had a three-year professional football career in the Anthracite, National Football, and first American Football leagues. Afterwards he worked as an English and Latin teacher, remaining involved in football by officiating high school and college games. He died in June 2003 at the age of 101.

== Early life ==
Marhefka, the son of Czech immigrants, was born in 1902 in Phillipsburg, New Jersey. He was an orphan by the age of 13 and attended the Benedictine Academy, where he was athletically involved in several sports. He entered Lafayette College in Easton, Pennsylvania, in 1920.

== Football career ==
A halfback, Marhefka spent four seasons, 1920 through 1924, on Lafayette's football team under coach Jock Sutherland. In 1921 the squad went undefeated, but the college's president refused to allow them to compete in the Rose Bowl. After graduation, he was picked up by the Pottsville Maroons and played with them during their sole season in the Anthracite League, in which they were the champions. He remained with the team when they joined the National Football League the following year and was with them when, despite having the best record in the league, they were denied the 1925 NFL championship after being controversially suspended. He did not, however, not play in any games for the Maroons during the 1925 season. Marhefka had a final season in professional football with the 1926 Philadelphia Quakers of the first American Football League, in which they were the champions. Marhekfa appeared in two games for the team during the season.

== Later life ==
After his playing career ended, Marhefka settled in Easton and worked as an English and Latin teacher at the local high school until 1968. He also served for many years as a swimming coach and a high school and college football official. He had one child, Joe Jr., with his first wife, prior to her death, and married his second wife, Gladys Walker, in 1947. Joe Jr. also played football for Layfayette. He died on June 30, 2003, of congestive heart failure, at the age of 101, several months after falling at his home. He was the last surviving member of the 1925 Pottsville Maroons and Lafayette's oldest alumnus.
