= John Fahay =

American football player (1902–1980)

Profile
- Position: E/G/HB/QB

Personal information
- Born: June 16, 1902; Mason City, Illinois
- Died: January 8, 1980 (aged 77); Fort Lauderdale, Florida
- Listed height: 6 ft 0 in (1.83 m)
- Listed weight: 189 lb (86 kg)

Career information
- College: Marquette

Career history
- Milwaukee Badgers (1925); Racine Tornadoes (1926); Chicago Bulls (1926); Minneapolis Red Jackets (1929)
- Stats at Pro Football Reference

John Fahay (June 16, 1902 – January 8, 1980) was a player in the National Football League. He was a member of the Milwaukee Badgers during the 1925 NFL season before playing the following season with the Racine Tornadoes during the 1926 NFL season. That same year he was also a member of the Chicago Bulls of the American Football League. After two years away from professional football, he played with the Minneapolis Red Jackets during the 1929 NFL season.

Prior to playing in the NFL, Fahary played both basketball and football collegiately at Marquette, where he was a captain for the basketball team. After retirement, Fahay became the head coach for the Harding High School football team, and also officiated both football and basketball.
