= Al Kreuz =

American football player (1898–1975)

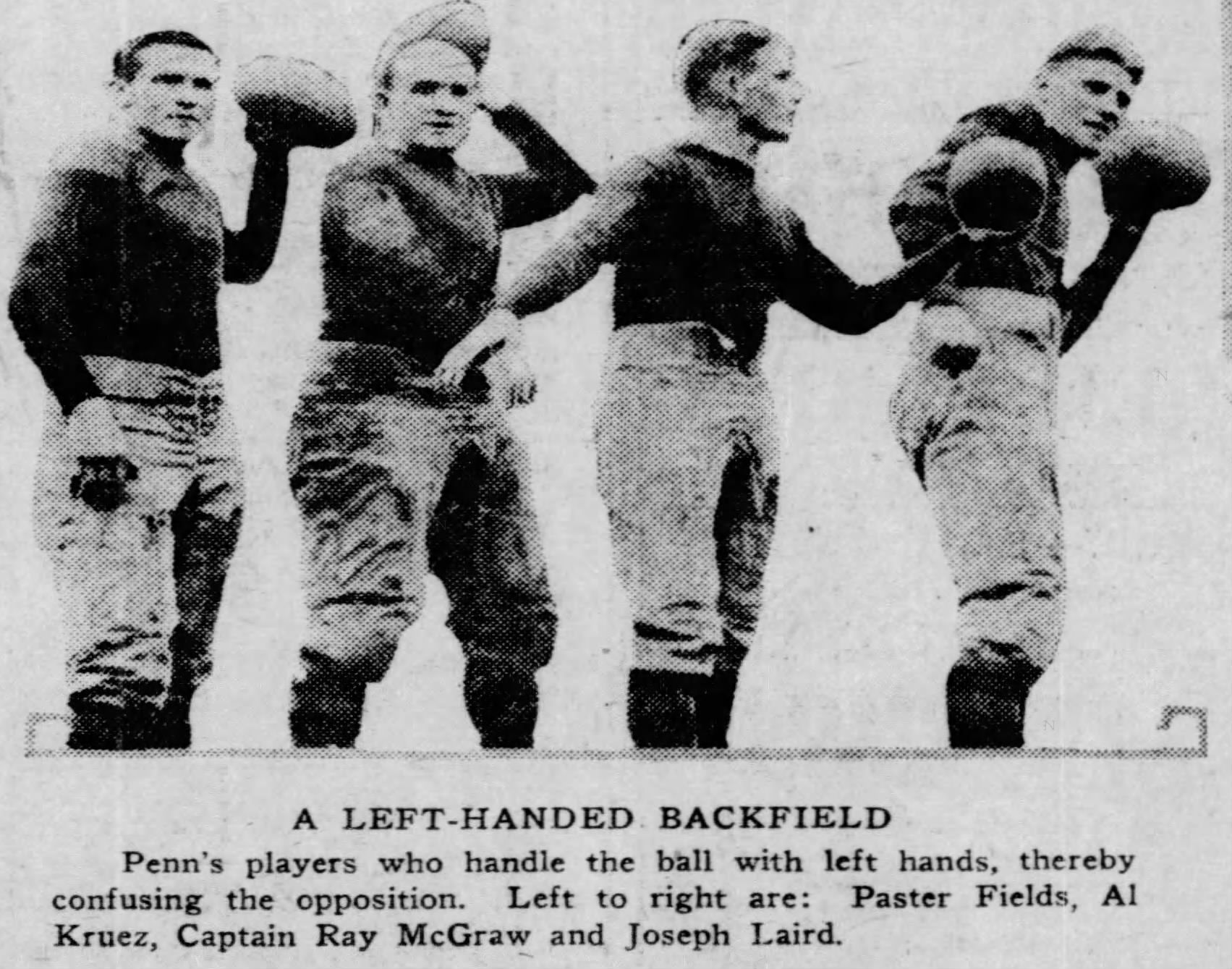
- Kreuz (second from left) in 1924

Profile
- Position: Fullback

Personal information
- Born: August 21, 1898
- Died: August 1975

Career information
- College: Kalamazoo College, Western Michigan University, University of Pennsylvania

Career history
- Philadelphia Quakers (1926)

Awards and highlights
- Second-team All-Eastern (1925)

Albert F. Kreuz (August 21, 1898 – August 1975) was an American football fullback. He played on the Philadelphia Quakers' 1926 American Football League (AFL) team, which won the league's only championship.

Kreuz played college football at the University of Pennsylvania as a back and placekicker. His first season at Pennsylvania was 1924, his sophomore year, and he played through 1925 before being ruled ineligible for the 1926 season due to having previously played for Kalamazoo College. Kreuz joined the Quakers in 1926. He played in all 10 games during the Quakers' 8–2 season, in which they won the AFL championship. The Chicago Tribune's Wilfrid Smith named Kreuz a second-team All-Pro fullback in a list that included players from the National Football League and AFL.
