= Red Strader =

American football player and coach (1902–1956)

No. 7
- Position: Fullback

Personal information
- Born: December 21, 1902; Newton, New Jersey, U.S.
- Died: May 26, 1956 (aged 53); Berkeley, California, U.S.
- Listed height: 5 ft 9 in (1.75 m)
- Listed weight: 200 lb (91 kg)

Career information
- High school: Modesto (Modesto, California)
- College: Saint Mary's

Career history

Playing
- 1926: Chicago Bulls
- 1927: Chicago Cardinals

Coaching
- 1928–1930: Regis
- 1932–1939: Saint Mary's (assistant)
- 1940–1941: Saint Mary's
- 1944: Camp Peary
- 1946–1948: New York Yankees (assistant)
- 1948–1949: New York Yankees
- 1950: New York Yanks
- 1952–1954: San Francisco 49ers (assistant)
- 1955: San Francisco 49ers

Awards and highlights
- Third-team All-American (1924); First-team All-PCC (1924)

Career NFL statistics
- Rushing yards: 17
- Average: 1.9
- Touchdowns: 1
- Stats at Pro Football Reference

Head coaching record
- Career: NFL: 11–13 (.458) college: 29–23 (.558)
- Coaching profile at Pro Football Reference

Other information
- Military career
- Allegiance: United States
- Branch: U.S. Navy
- Service years: 1942–1946
- Rank: Lt. Commander
- Conflicts: World War II

Norman Parker "Red" Strader (December 21, 1902 – May 26, 1956) was an American football player and coach who served in both capacities at the collegiate and professional levels. In the college ranks, he spent two years as head coach at Saint Mary's College of California, and later held the same position with the New York Yankees of the All-America Football Conference (AAFC), and the New York Yanks and San Francisco 49ers of the National Football League (NFL).

== Playing career ==
=== High school and college ===
Born in Newton, New Jersey, Strader moved with his family six months after his arrival to Modesto, California, attending high school in the town. He advanced to Saint Mary's, where he played at fullback under future College Football Hall of Fame coach Slip Madigan. During his final year in 1925, he was recognized as the first player in Gael history to earn All-American recognition.

=== Professional ===
Strader then turned to baseball when he was signed on February 20, 1926, by the Cleveland Indians. He played with three teams: the Saginaw Aces in Saginaw, Michigan; Wheeling Stogies in Wheeling, West Virginia; and Hollywood Stars in Hollywood, California, but returned to football in 1926, when he played one season with the Chicago Bulls of the first American Football League and another season with the National Football League's Chicago Cardinals.

== Coaching career ==
=== College ===
In 1928, Strader took his first football coaching job when accepted the top job for Regis College in Colorado. By 1932, he returned to Saint Mary's working under Madigan for the next eight seasons, but when health problems forced Madigan to retire, Strader was promoted to head coach on March 17, 1940.

After two seasons as head coach, Strader was irritated when the Gaels' Bay area rival, the University of San Francisco, blocked the team from using their regular field at Kezar Stadium. However, greater considerations due to the onset of World War II and Saint Mary's turning over a portion of their campus to naval training caused Strader to resign and spend the next 40 months in the service. During this period, he rose to the rank of lieutenant commander while coaching football and baseball at a trio of naval bases.

=== Professional ===
Upon the end of the war, Strader was hired in 1946 as backfield coach of the New York Yankees of the fledgling All-America Football Conference (AAFC). When head coach Ray Flaherty was forced out after a slow start on September 17, 1948, Strader was elevated to take his place. In his first season, the Yankees split their 10 remaining games, then reached the playoffs the following year with an 8–4 mark.

In December 1949, the AAFC was officially merged with the NFL, with a majority of the Yankees players being shifted to the older league's New York Bulldogs. Strader was named to lead the remolded team on January 5, 1950, and led the Yanks to a 7–5 finish that season. However, in June 1951 he was hospitalized for several weeks with heart problems. Those health concerns resulted in his departure on August 5, 1951, with team owner Ted Collins stating that he wanted assurances that Strader would not be compromised by the strains of coaching, a comment that Strader vigorously denied, saying he had been fired.

Strader's anger continued six weeks later when he filed a lawsuit asking for $10,000 in salary from Collins, while also severely criticizing the NFL draft. Despite having only an oral agreement, Strader won his salary case on February 28, 1952, and also gained $1,451 in expenses from Collins, who had since sold the team to a group that had moved and renamed the team as the Dallas Texans.

Briefly considered to replace Dick Todd as head coach of the Washington Redskins, Strader spent the 1952 NFL season as an assistant coach and scout with the 49ers before resigning on March 28, 1953. He spent the next year working in the construction business, while continuing to scout, and was again speculated as a head coaching candidate. This time, the team was the Baltimore Colts, but when Weeb Ewbank was hired by Baltimore, Strader stayed in his earlier roles.

==== San Francisco ====
San Francisco head coach Buck Shaw was fired on December 13, 1954, after serving as the only coach in franchise history, with Strader being hired 10 days later to replace him. Shaw's main flaw with team owner Tony Morabito was his inability to win a championship, but Morabito said winning a title in his first year would not be reason to dismiss Strader.

In spite of a strong series of wins during the preseason, that opinion would change when the 49ers split their first six contests, then lost to the Los Angeles Rams on November 6, 1955. That defeat caused one fan to hang Strader in effigy outside Kezar Stadium, and by the end of the season, the 49ers had won just four of 12 contests, and dealt with reports of continued conflict between the coach and his players. Upon being fired on December 19, Strader disputed such talk by noting that he had been given the game ball in the season's final game.

== Death and lawsuit ==
Five months after being fired from his position as San Francisco's head coach, Strader died in his sleep of a heart attack, the result of cardiac problems that had plagued him for the past two years. On December 12, 1956, Strader's widow, Helen, filed a $27,000 lawsuit against the 49ers, asking for the compensation provided by her husband's contract. Three years later, she received an out-of-court settlement for $18,000.

== Head coaching record ==
=== College ===
Year	Team	Overall	Conference	Standing
Regis Rangers (Independent) (1928–1930)
1928	Regis	5–4		
1929	Regis	3–7		
1930	Regis	6–3		
Regis:		14–14		
Saint Mary's Gaels (Independent) (1940–1941)
1940	Saint Mary's	5–3		
1941	Saint Mary's	5–4		
Saint Mary's:		10–7		
Camp Peary Pirates (Independent) (1944)
1944	Camp Peary	5–2		
Camp Peary:		5–2		
Total:		29–23		

=== NFL ===
Team	Year	Regular season				
Team	Year	Won	Lost	Ties	Win %	Finish
NYY	1950	7	5	0	.583	3rd in NFL Eastern
NYY total		7	5	0	.583	
SF	1955	4	8	0	.333	5th in NFL Western
SF total		4	8	0	.333	
Total		11	13	0	.458	
