= Dick Stahlman =

American football player (1902–1970)

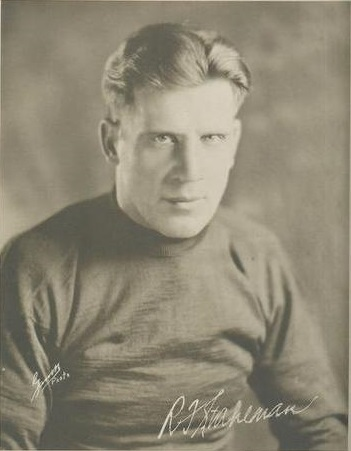

Profile
- Position: Lineman

Personal information
- Born: October 20, 1902; Chicago, Illinois, U.S.
- Died: May 11, 1970 (aged 67); Chicago, Illinois, U.S.
- Listed height: 6 ft 2 in (1.88 m)
- Listed weight: 219 lb (99 kg)

Career information
- College: DePaul, Northwestern

Career history
- Akron Pros (1924); Hammond Pros (1924); Kansas City Blues (1924); Kenosha Maroons (1924); Akron Pros (1925); Rock Island Independents (1926); Chicago Bulls (1926); New York Giants (1927); New York Giants (1930); Green Bay Packers (1931–1932); Chicago Bears (1933)

Awards and highlights
- 1925 GB Press-Gazette: 2nd Team All-NFL; 1931 Collyers Eye Mag.: 1st Team All-NFL; 1931 NFL: 2nd Team All-NFL
- Stats at Pro Football Reference

Richard Frederick Stahlman (October 20, 1902 – May 11, 1970) was an American football lineman. He played seven seasons in the National Football League (NFL) and one season in the first American Football League (AFL).
