= Roy White (American football) =

American football player (1900–1993)

No. 9, 8
- Positions: Fullback, linebacker

Personal information
- Born: February 28, 1900; Brownwood, Texas, U.S.
- Died: May 15, 1993 (aged 93); San Antonio, Texas, U.S.
- Listed height: 6 ft 0 in (1.83 m)
- Listed weight: 195 lb (88 kg)

Career information
- High school: Brownwood
- College: Valparaiso

Career history
- Chicago Bears (1925); Chicago Bulls (1926); Chicago Bears (1927–1929)
- Stats at Pro Football Reference

Roy Eldon White (February 28, 1900 – May 15, 1993) was an American professional football player for the Chicago Bears of the National Football League (NFL). He played college football for the Daniel Baker Hill Billies and Valparaiso Crusaders.

== Early life ==
Roy Eldon White was born on February 28, 1900, in Brownwood, Texas. He played high school football at Brownwood High School. He also played baseball as a youth. White joined the United States Navy when he was 17 and was aboard the USS Alcedo when it was sunk. The USS Alcedo was the first American vessel lost in World War I.

== College career ==
White enrolled at Daniel Baker College to play college football for the Hill Billies. He was a member of the Hill Billies from 1920 to 1922 as a halfback. He was elected team captain of the 1922 Hill Billies. White also played guard on Daniel Baker's basketball team and catcher on the baseball team.

White later transferred to Valparaiso University, where he was a member of the Crusaders from 1923 to 1924. In 1993, the San Antonio Express-News claimed that White won the U.S. amateur boxing championship in 1924.

== Professional career ==
White played in ten games, starting one, for the Chicago Bears of the National Football League (NFL) in 1925 as a fullback on offense and a linebacker on defense. He scored three rushing touchdowns that season.

White appeared in all 14 games, starting 13, for the Chicago Bulls of the American Football League in 1926, scoring one rushing touchdown.

White returned to the Bears in 1927. He played in 36 games, starting 24, for the Bears from 1927 to 1929, scoring seven rushing touchdowns.

== Personal life ==
White was a football coach at Daniel Baker College from 1931 to 1932. He was also a football coach at several Texas high schools from 1930 to 1940. He was the principal of a school in Menard, Texas in 1940. White was a football coach and math teacher at Edison High School in San Antonio from 1944 to 1964. He died on May 15, 1993, in San Antonio at the age of 93.
