= Whitey Thomas =

American football player (1895–1978)

William Claude "Whitey" Thomas
Penn State
- Position: End

Personal information
- Born: July 15, 1893
- Died: July 13, 1959 (aged 65); New Jersey
- Listed height: 5 ft 10 in (1.78 m)
- Listed weight: 180 lb (82 kg)

Career information
- College: Penn State

Career history
- 1922–1923: Frankford Athletic Assoc. (Ind.)
- 1924: Frankford Yellow Jackets (NFL)
- 1926: Philadelphia Quakers (AFL I)
- 1927: Atlantic City Roses (ELPF)

Awards and highlights
- AFL Champion (1926)

William C. "Whitey" Thomas (August 17, 1895 – August 1978) was an American football end. He played for the Frankford Yellow Jackets in 1924 in the National Football League and for the Philadelphia Quakers in 1926 in the first American Football League. Thomas also played for the Yellow Jackets in 1922 and in 1923, before the team became members of the NFL. He played college football for Penn State, before playing professionally.

During Whitey's final season of professional football in 1927, he played for the Atlantic City Roses. During a 6–0 loss to the Staten Island Stapletons, he caught four passes for 101 yards.
