= Charley Way =

American football player and coach (1897–1988)

- Way in 1920

Profile
- Positions: Halfback, quarterback

Personal information
- Born: December 29, 1897; Embreeville, Pennsylvania, U.S.
- Died: January 31, 1988 (aged 90); Honey Brook, Pennsylvania, U.S.
- Listed height: 5 ft 8 in (1.73 m)
- Listed weight: 144 lb (65 kg)

Career information
- College: Penn State

Career history

Playing
- 1921: Canton Bulldogs
- 1924: Frankford Yellow Jackets
- 1926: Philadelphia Quakers

Coaching
- 1921: Dayton

Awards and highlights
- Consensus All-American (1920); All-Pro (1924); AFL champion (1926)

Charles Ash "Pie" Way (December 29, 1897 – January 31, 1988) was an American football player and coach. He played college football at Pennsylvania State University, where was a consensus selection to 1920 College Football All-America Team as a halfback.

== Biography ==
After leading the 1920 Penn State Nittany Lions football team to an undefeated season, the small (144 lb.) but speedy Way began his professional career in the National Football League (NFL), first with the Canton Bulldogs in 1921 and became an All-Pro as a member of fellow Nittany Lion, Punk Berryman's Frankford Yellow Jackets in 1924. He was a member of the 1926 American Football League champion Philadelphia Quakers.

Way served as the head football at the University of Dayton in 1921. He also coach at Virginia Tech.

Way earned a Bachelor of Arts degree in finance from Penn State University in 1921 and had a long career with the Internal Revenue Service following his playing days.

== Later years and death ==
Way lived in Thorndale, Pennsylvania until his death at the age of 90 on January 31, 1988.

== Head coaching record ==
=== College ===
Year	Team	Overall	Conference	Standing	Bowl/playoffs
Dayton (Independent) (1921)
1921	Dayton	0–7–1 (Note: Way served as head coach for the first eight games of the 1921 season, before resigning on November 23. Bud Talbott coached the final game of the season. Dayton finished 1–7–1 overall.)			
Dayton:		0–7–1			
Total:		0–7–1			
