= Ojay Larson =

American football player (1897–1977)

No. 14, 17
- Position: Center

Personal information
- Born: October 15, 1897; Calumet, Michigan, U.S.
- Died: May 1, 1977 (aged 79); Glendale, Wisconsin, U.S.

Career information
- College: Notre Dame

Career history
- Chicago Bears (1922); Milwaukee Badgers (1923–1924); Green Bay Packers (1925); Chicago Bears (1929); Chicago Cardinals (1929)

Career NFL statistics
- Games played: 52
- Games started: 47
- Stats at Pro Football Reference

Frederic Adolphus "Ojay" Larson Jr. (October 15, 1897 – May 1, 1977) was an American football center. He played for the Chicago Bears, Milwaukee Badgers, Green Bay Packers, and the Chicago Cardinals of the National Football League (NFL). He played college football for Notre Dame alongside his childhood friends George Gipp and Hunk Anderson. He was inducted into the Calumet High School Athletic Hall of Fame and the Upper Peninsula Sports Hall of Fame.
