= Philadelphia Quakers (AFL) =

1926 American football team

Logo

General information
- Founded: 1926
- Folded: 1926
- Stadium: Sesquicentennial Stadium
- Headquartered: Philadelphia, Pennsylvania, United States
- Colors: Light Blue, Yellow, White

Personnel
- Owner: L. S. Conway
- Head coach: Bob Folwell

Team history
- Philadelphia Quakers (1926)

League / conference affiliations
- American Football League

Championships
- AFL Championships: 1; 1926

The Philadelphia Quakers were a professional American football team that competed in the first American Football League in 1926 and won the league's only championship.

== History ==
Owned by L. S. Conway, the Quakers played their home games in Sesquicentennial Stadium on Saturdays because of Pennsylvania’s Blue laws prohibiting work or business on Sundays. Coached by Bob Folwell, the majority of the team played their college football in Pennsylvania. The Quakers had nine players (including Century Milstead, Charlie Way, Butch Spagna, and Bull Behman) who had previously played for various National Football League teams. The combined experience gave the team an edge in line play, particularly on defense (the Quakers yielded only five points per game for the 1926 season). The addition of All-American Glenn Killinger merely added to the defensive riches: he intercepted four passes in his league debut (November 4, 1926, in a 24-0 victory over the Rock Island Independents).

Unlike half of their league opponents, the Quakers had no financial connection with league founders C. C. Pyle and Red Grange; Conway had previously owned another Philadelphia Quakers football team in 1921, which was an on-field success but forced to disband when its player-sharing scheme with the NFL's Buffalo All-Americans was halted and a bid to join the NFL in 1922 fell through. In addition to having a championship team, the AFL Quakers drew well in the stadium in the midst of the Sesquicentennial Exposition. When the fair ended (early November), the audience in the soon-to-be renamed Municipal Stadium diminished, but still drew well when the Quakers defeated the New York Yankees 13-7 on a Bob Dinsmore punt return that decided the game - and the league championship (November 27, 1926).

At the time of the championship-clinching game, the AFL had only four active teams (the Quakers, the Yankees, the Los Angeles Wildcats, and the Chicago Bulls), three of which were being subsidized by C. C. Pyle and Red Grange. The latter three teams played games in the last two weeks of the season while the Quakers started challenging National Football League teams for a “pro football championship game.” The NFL champions Frankford Yellow Jackets were the first to refuse, claiming that their postseason schedule had been already set. Additional challenges by the Quakers were unanswered until Tim Mara, owner of the seventh place New York Giants, accepted the challenge, scheduling a game for December 12, 1926, at the Polo Grounds.

As the Yankees and the Bulls were playing the AFL's last official game (a 7-3 Yankees victory in Comiskey Park), the Quakers and the Giants were battling in front of 5,000 fans in the middle of a driving snowstorm. While the score was only 3–0 at halftime, Quaker errors led to the Giants winning the game 31–0. Both the Quakers and the AFL were no more.

At the end of the season, former NFL player Wilfred Smith of the Chicago Tribune presented a combined NFL-AFL All-Pro team in his column. Three Quakers were named to the second team: George Tully, Bull Behman, and Al Kreuz.

Year	W	L	T	Finish	Coach
1926	8	2	0	1st	Bob Folwell

== After the first AFL ==
Upon the completion of a New York Yankees 7–3 victory over the Chicago Bulls in Comiskey Park on December 12, 1926, the first AFL was officially dead. The simultaneous 31-0 drubbing of the Quakers by the New York Giants in the Polo Grounds left the AFL champions in a similar state.

It was, however, not the end of the professional football career for five Philadelphia Quakers. The following men were on rosters of NFL teams in the 1927 season:

Bob Beattie – 1927 New York Yankees, 1929 Orange Tornadoes, 1930 Newark Tornadoes
Bull Behman – 1927–31 Frankford Yellow Jackets (player-coach 1930–31)
Adrian Ford – 1927 Pottsville Maroons, 1927 Frankford Yellow Jackets
Century Milstead – 1927–28 New York Giants
George Tully – 1927 Frankford Yellow Jackets

On the other hand, the pro football careers of several former NFL players ended with the 1926 Quakers:

Charlie Cartin – 1925 Frankford Yellow Jackets
Saville Crowther – 1925 Frankford Yellow Jackets
Doc Elliott – 1922–23 Canton Bulldogs, 1924–25 Cleveland Bulldogs
Glenn Killinger – 1921 Canton Bulldogs, 1926 New York Giants
Johnny Schott – 1920-23 Buffalo All-Americans
Butch Spagna – 1920 Cleveland Tigers, 1920-21 Buffalo All-Americans, 1924-25 Frankford Yellow Jackets
George Sullivan – 1924-25 Frankford Yellow Jackets
Whitey Thomas – 1924 Frankford Yellow Jackets
Charlie Way – 1921 Canton Bulldogs, 1924 Frankford Yellow Jackets

NOTE: Doc Elliott came out of retirement in 1931 to play for the Cleveland Indians.
