= 1926 American Football League season =

The 1926 AFL season was the only season of the first American Football League. It started with nine teams, with the initial game of the season being played in front of 22,000 fans in Cleveland, Ohio, but by the end of the season (December 14, 1926), only four teams were still in existence: three teams owned or subsidized by league founder C. C. Pyle and star Red Grange (New York Yankees, Los Angeles Wildcats, and Chicago Bulls) and league champion Philadelphia Quakers. The initial lineup of teams included the traveling Wildcats and a charter member of the National Football League, the Rock Island Independents, which became a second traveling team after having poor attendance in its first three games.

Most AFL games were defensive affairs, with only New York and the Cleveland Panthers averaging more than 10 points of offense per contest. The majority of scoring was by either placement or drop kick; Chicago's Joey Sternaman scored 52 of the team's total of 88 (60% of Chicago’s points), but that was not the largest share of team points in the AFL of 1926: Newark's Doug Wycoff had his team's entire point total for the year when he scored a touchdown and kicked the extra point in the Bears' first game.

While Philadelphia and New York were consistently playing in front of crowds of at least 20,000 per game, the rest of the league was not so fortunate. While crowds of more than 10,000 attended games in Fenway Park and Comiskey Park in September and October, crowds in other AFL cities were consistently much smaller: Rock Island (Moline, Illinois) struggled to draw 5000 into its home stadium; Newark did not have a total of 5000 in its three home games combined. Competing against the Brooklyn Lions of the National Football League, the Brooklyn Horsemen called it quits in November and merged with its NFL brethren. As the AFL decreased in size in October and November, so did the attendance figures in Philadelphia, the only team in the AFL reported to have made a profit.

Two weeks after clinching the AFL championship, the Philadelphia Quakers played an exhibition game with the NFL's sixth place team, the New York Giants, in a driving snowstorm at the Polo Grounds. Only 5000 hardy fans witnessed the home team's 31-0 whitewash of the AFL titlists. While the New York Yankees and Los Angeles Wildcats went on a barnstorming tour, the rest of the American Football League folded.

== League standings ==
Team	W	L	T	Pct.	PF	PA	Head Coach
Philadelphia Quakers	8	2	0	.800	93	52	Bob Folwell
New York Yankees	10	5	0	.667	212	82	Ralph Scott
Cleveland Panthers	3	2	0	.600	62	46	Ray Watts
Los Angeles Wildcats	6	6	2	.500	105	83	Jim Clark
Chicago Bulls	5	6	3	.455	88	69	Joey Sternaman
Boston Bulldogs	2	4	0	.333	20	81	Herb Treat
Rock Island Independents	2	6	1	.250	21	126	Johnny Armstrong
Brooklyn Horsemen	1	3	0	.250	25	68	Eddie McNeeley
Newark Bears	0	3	2	.000	7	26	Harold Hansen

== League Games ==
=== Week One ===
==== Cleveland Panthers 10, New York Yankees 0 ====
September 26, 1926 – Luna Bowl, Cleveland, Ohio (attendance 22,000) The opening game of the league designed to showcase Red Grange and his New York Yankees resulted in complete domination by the host Cleveland Panthers, with a 10-0 score. While the visitors were kept out of the end zone, a pass from Al Michaels to Dave Noble and a field goal by Doc Elliott provided all the points for the Panthers, which used mostly players who were members of the 1925 Cleveland Bulldogs NFL team.

==== Rock Island Independents 7, Los Angeles Wildcats 3 ====
September 26, 1926 – Browning Field, Moline, Illinois (attendance 2500) A charter member of the National Football League opened its initial season in a new AFL as the host Rock Island Independents defeated Wildcat Wilson's traveling squad, the Los Angeles Wildcats, 7-3. An 18-yard field goal by Jim Lawson put L.A. on the board in the first quarter, but Rock Island took the lead in the second quarter with a short touchdown run by quarterback Johnny Armstrong, who had set up the play with a long pass to Wes Bradshaw.

==== Chicago Bulls 7, Newark Bears 7 ====
September 26, 1926 – Davids' Stadium, Newark, New Jersey (attendance 2000) The Chicago Bulls and the host Newark Bears played in the AFL’s first tie game, 7-7. The visiting Bulls started the game with a dominating drive with a 40-yard run by owner/coach/quarterback Joey Sternaman, a pass to Eddie Anderson, and a five-yard touchdown run by Buck White. After a first half of frustration, Newark's Doug Wycoff gained 60 yards in a drive which resulted in a Wycoff touchdown plunge and a Wycoff extra point to tie the game. No one knew it at the time, but it proved to be the only points that the Bears would score in its short AFL history.

=== Week Two ===
==== Philadelphia Quakers 9, Chicago Bulls 3 ====
October 2, 1926 – Sesquicentennial Stadium, Philadelphia, Pennsylvania (attendance 8000) Making their debut in the AFL with the first of six consecutive Saturday home games (Pennsylvania's Blue Laws prohibited games on Sunday), the Philadelphia Quakers defeated the visiting Chicago Bulls 9-3, in which all the points in the game were scored by field goals. An interception by the Bulls' Johnny Mohardt set up Joey Sternaman's drop kick for Chicago's only points in the game, while the Quakers' Al Kreuz placekicked three field goals of his own.

==== New York Yankees 26, Rock Island Independents 0 ====
October 3, 1926 – Douglas Park, Rock Island, Illinois (attendance 5000) Despite the Rock Island Independents' outplaying the visiting team, a muddy field and a slew of Rock Island penalties led to the New York Yankees posting a 26-0 shutout. Although Red Grange's team scored a touchdown in each quarter, the Yankees racked up a total of four first downs in the game. Grange scored two TDs (a 20-yard run and catching a 15-yard pass from George Pease), and Harry Fry (an 82-yard interception return) and Pooley Hubert (five-yard run) scored one touchdown each.

==== Cleveland Panthers 17, Los Angeles Wildcats 14 ====
October 3, 1926 – Luna Park, Cleveland (no attendance report) After the traveling Los Angeles Wildcats scored 14 points in the fourth quarter to take the lead, the host Cleveland Panthers beat the visitors 17-14 on a 40-yard pass from Al Michaels to Cookie Cunningham. The winning touchdown was the duo's second touchdown of the game. After Doc Elliott dropkicked a field goal in the first quarter, Cunningham's first touchdown staked the Panthers to a 10-0 lead in the third frame. Touchdowns by Wildcat Wilson (a run) and John Vesser (a pass from Wilson) gave the Wildcats a short-lived lead.

==== Boston Bulldogs 3, Newark Bears 0 ====
October 3, 1926 – Davids' Stadium, Newark, New Jersey (attendance 1000) The Boston Bulldogs became the last AFL team to play its inaugural game by beating the host Newark Bears, 3-0, on a 40-yard field goal by Erwin Gehrke in the fourth quarter. The Bears lost its sole source of offense when back Doug Wycoff was injured in the team's first game and was limited to a mere few minutes in this match. The Bulldogs' offense was just as ineffectual until Gehrke's deciding kick.

==== Brooklyn Horsemen 12, Chicago Bulls 7 ====
October 3, 1926 – Commercial Field, Brooklyn, New York (attendance 10,000) One day after losing to Philadelphia, the visiting Chicago Bulls lost to the Brooklyn Horsemen, 12-7. The Bears had the first score of the game, a run by Joey Sternaman in the second quarter, before the Horsemen had touchdowns by Earl Britton (a run) and Ed Harrison (a 60-yard pass from Sternaman) in the second half to seize the lead.

=== Week Three ===
==== Philadelphia Quakers 3, Los Angeles Wildcats 0 ====
October 9, 1926 – Sesquicentennial Stadium, Philadelphia (attendance 35,000) For the second straight Saturday, the Philadelphia Quakers kept the visiting team from their end zone as they prevailed over the Los Angeles Wildcats, 3-0, and for the second consecutive game, all of the Quakers' points were scored by Al Kreuz. Wildcat Wilson's running, passing, and kicking for his traveling squad dominated the game, but each time Los Angeles threatened to score, the Quakers' defense stopped the Wildcats. The deciding field goal was the culmination of a sequence of events that began with a failed 55-yard field goal attempt by Kreuz. While the kick fell short, the Quakers' Whitey Thomas downed the ball at the one-yard line. Wilson was forced to punt from his end zone; Philadelphia resumed possession of the ball on the Los Angeles side of the field, ultimately resulting in a successful 28 yard placekick by Kreuz.

==== New York Yankees 13, Boston Bulldogs 0 ====
October 9, 1926 – Fenway Park, Boston, Massachusetts (attendance 12,000) Professional football makes its debut at the fabled Fenway as the host Boston Bulldogs were shut out by the visiting New York Yankees, 13-0, despite Red Grange spending most of the second half on the New York bench. Eddie Tryon had a long touchdown run in the second quarter, while Bullet Baker caught a touchdown pass from George Pease in the fourth. Boston's offense may have been weak, but its defense, led by Bulger Lowe, kept the Bulldogs in the game for most of the game.

==== Rock Island Independents 7, Chicago Bulls 3 ====
October 10, 1926 – Browning Park, Moline, Illinois (attendance 1700) No one knew it at the time, but an era was coming to an end as the home Rock Island Independents combined effective passing by Johnny Mohardt and rushing by Marty Norton to defeat the visiting Chicago Bulls, 7-3. Joey Sternaman put the first points on the board by a dropkicked field goal after Chicago end intercepted a Mohardt pass in the second quarter; Norton scored the game's lone touchdown in the fourth.

Citing low attendance, Independents owner Arch Bowlby announced that Rock Island would become a traveling team, and the team's future would depend upon its performance and results on the road. In addition, center Lou Kolis retired after the game to concentrate on his campaign for sheriff. Kolis had played more games for the Independents than any other player.

==== Los Angeles Wildcats 23, Brooklyn Horsemen 0 ====
October 10, 1926 – Commercial Field, Brooklyn, New York (attendance 6000) After three weeks of futility, the team without a home field, the Los Angeles Wildcats, routed the host Brooklyn Horsemen, 23-0. Rushes by Duke Morrison and Wildcat Wilson produced touchdowns, as did a pass from Wilson to Ed Illman. The Wildcats' Ray Flaherty also had a 50-yard catch against the Horsemen's overmatched defense.

==== Cleveland Panthers at Newark Bears, cancelled ====
Game scheduled for October 10, 1926, at Davids' Stadium, Newark, was cancelled due to driving rain.

=== Week Four ===
==== Philadelphia Quakers 9, Newark Bears 0 ====
October 16, 1926 – Sesquicentennial Stadium, Philadelphia, Pennsylvania (attendance 40,000) The Philadelphia Quakers shut out the visiting Newark Bears, 9-0, in front of the largest crowd to attend an American Football League game. Unlike the previous three Quakers games, this one had Philadelphia score a touchdown: Al Kreuz intercepted an errant pass from Newark's Jimmy Brewster and returned the ball to the Bears 18-yard line, and then rushed into the end zone in a subsequent play. While Kreuz missed the extra point attempt, he did have a successful field goal try earlier in the quarter. At this point, the Quakers were undefeated, with Kreuz having scored every one of his team's points.

==== Los Angeles Wildcats 21, Boston Bulldogs 0 ====
October 17, 1926 – Braves Field, Boston, Massachusetts (attendance 2000) The Los Angeles Wildcats scored all of its points in the first quarter as the visiting team overwhelmed the Boston Bulldogs, 21-0. All three touchdowns came on long plays: a Wildcat Wilson-to-Ram Morrison 50-yard pass, a 70-yard punt return by Mal Bross, and a 25-yard Wilson-to-Bross pass. Dick Reed became the fourth Wildcat to kick an extra point, after Bross, Ed Illman, and Jim Lawson did the duty in previous games.

==== Chicago Bulls 14, New York Yankees 0 ====
October 17, 1926 – Comiskey Park, Chicago, Illinois (attendance 16,000) After they forced the NFL Chicago Cardinals to move to their home games from Comiskey Park to a smaller Normal Field, the Chicago Bulls won their home opener by shutting out the New York Yankees, 14-0. While Bulls tailback Johnny Mohardt scored two touchdowns, the real stars of the game were the Chicago line, who neutralized the Yankees offense.

==== Cleveland Panthers 23, Rock Island Independents 7 ====
October 17, 1926 – Luna Park, Cleveland, Ohio (attendance 6000) As the Rock Island Independents started its odyssey as a traveling team, the host Cleveland Panthers remained undefeated by winning a lopsided game, 23-7. Dave Noble rushed for two touchdowns, Dick Wolf caught a 29-yard pass from Al Michaels, and Guy Roberts kicked two field goals to give the Panthers a 23-0 lead before the reserves came in. A 20-yard pass from Johnny Armstrong to Wes Bradshaw in the fourth quarter ended the shutout.

==== Los Angeles Wildcats 7, Newark Bears 0 ====
October 17, 1926 – Davids' Stadium, Newark, New Jersey (attendance 2000) Despite the outstanding play of the host Newark Bears defense, the traveling Los Angeles Wildcats prevailed, 7-0. The game's sole touchdown was scored by Mal Bross on a pass from Wildcat Wilson to cap a 68-yard drive. While the Bears defense held their own, the Newark offense (led by Doug Wycoff) was a model of inconsistency as the team was shut out for the second time in 24 hours. One day after playing in front of 40,000 spectators in Philadelphia, Newark struggled in front of a mere 2000 at home. The worst is yet to come for the ill-fated Bears.

==== Boston Bulldogs 17, Brooklyn Horsemen 0 ====
October 17, 1926 – Commercial Field, Brooklyn, New York (attendance 4000) One day after being shut out in Braves Field, the visiting Boston Bulldogs overcame a soggy Commercial Field and shut out the host Brooklyn Horsemen, 17-0 in what turned out to be the last Brooklyn AFL home game. A first-quarter fumble recovery and return by Charlie Morrison was the first scoring play, while tailback Bill Cronin added a short touchdown run in the fourth period. The Bulldogs had three different players score points by kicking: Joe McGlone and Erwing Gehrke kicked extra points, while Carl Etelman kicked a field goal. Etelman also had a field attempt blocked and intercepted a Harry Stuhldreher pass to set up Cronin's score.

=== Week Five ===
==== Philadelphia Quakers 9, Rock Island Independents 0 ====
October 23, 1926 – Sesquicentennial Stadium, Philadelphia, Pennsylvania (attendance 15,000) Playing their fifth straight home game, the Philadelphia Quakers maintained their undefeated record by shutting out the traveling Rock Island Independents, 9-0. After Al Kreuz kicked a field goal, the Quakers finally had someone other than their fullback/kicker put points on the board when Adrian Ford intercepted a Johnny Armstrong pass and returned it 18 yards for the team’s second touchdown of the season. The Rock Island offense stayed in the game as Wes Bradshaw's passing started dominating the second half, but one drive ended as Frank Coyle dropped a pass in the end zone.

==== Newark Bears at Boston Bulldogs, cancelled ====
Game scheduled for October 23, 1926, at Braves Field, Boston, was cancelled due to inclement weather. It was the second cancelled game for the financially shaky Bears.

==== New York Yankees 6, Los Angeles Wildcats 0 ====
October 24, 1926 – Yankee Stadium, New York, New York (attendance 11,560 – announced as 20,000) Missed field goals and a steady rain dampened the New York Yankees' home opener against the traveling Los Angeles Wildcats as the home team prevailed 6-0 on an 80-yard touchdown run in the fourth quarter. Both the Yankees' Art Coglizer and the Wildcats' Jim Lawson missed a pair of field goal attempts. In the fourth quarter, a 30-yard catch by Ray Flaherty set up Lawson’s second failed attempt; shortly afterwards, New York's Eddie Tryon decided the game with his long run through the muddy field.

==== Chicago Bulls 19, Cleveland Panthers 12 ====
October 24, 1926 – Comiskey Park, Chicago, Illinois (attendance 3000) Owner/head coach/quarterback Joey Sternaman put on a one-man show as the host Chicago Bulls gave the visiting Cleveland Panthers their first defeat, 19-12. A long Sternaman pass to Buck White set up the first score, a short run by John Mohardt. Later in the first quarter, Sternaman’s recovery of a Cleveland fumble led to a field goal, also by Sternaman. Passing by Al Michaels and two touchdown runs by Dave Noble gave the Panthers the lead in the third quarter, but a 55-yard run by Sternaman set up a touchdown rush by the Chicago signal caller, who later added another field goal to finish the scoring.

==== Rock Island Independents 0, Newark Demons 0 ====
October 24, 1926 – Davids' Stadium, Newark, New Jersey (attendance 400) Although it wasn’t known at the time, the host Newark Demons (formerly the Bears) played the last game of their existence, tying the Rock Island Independents, 0-0, on a storm-drenched field. There were only seven first downs made in the game (five for Rock Island, two for Newark). Neither Bear quarterback Doug Wycoff nor Independents signal caller Johnny Armstrong could pass the ball effectively as the teams were forced to resort to line plunges for the entire game. Rock Island's Wes Bradshaw missed two field goal attempts, but Newark was in no position to try even one. After the game, Newark became the first AFL team to call it quits.

==== Philadelphia Quakers at Brooklyn Horsemen, cancelled ====
Game scheduled for October 24, 1926, at Ebbets Field, Brooklyn, was cancelled due to driving rain.

=== Week Six ===
==== New York Yankees 23, Philadelphia Quakers 0 ====
October 30, 1926 – Sesquicentennial Stadium, Philadelphia, Pennsylvania (attendance 30,000) After three scoreless quarters, the host Philadelphia Quakers was handed its first loss by the visiting New York Yankees, 23-0. George Pease broke the deadlock with a touchdown run for the Yankees, and Eddie Tryon scored 11 points for New York as he caught a touchdown pass (from Pooley “Papa” Hubert) and kicked a field goal and two extra points. Hubert was also the recipient of a touchdown toss, this time from Larry Marks, and Red Grange was credited with 91 yards in rushing and receiving. This was the first of four games to be played by the Yankees in the space of nine days.

==== Los Angeles Wildcats 6, Cleveland Panthers 0 ====
October 31, 1926 – Luna Park, Cleveland, Ohio (attendance 1000) A little more than one month after opening the AFL season in front of 22,000 fans, the Cleveland Panthers lost its swan song to the Los Angeles Wildcats, 6-0, in front of an audience of only 1000 people. Both teams' defensive lines (particularly the Panthers' Al Nesser) controlled the game, which was a scoreless struggle until Cleveland’s Al Michaels fumbled. A few plays after the Wildcats recovered the ball on the 20-yard line, Duke Morrison ran the ball into the end zone for the only score in the game. Later that day, the Cleveland Panthers, unbeaten seven days earlier, ceased to exist.

==== Chicago Bulls 23, Boston Bulldogs 0 ====
October 31, 1926 – Comiskey Park, Chicago, Illinois (attendance 4000) As was the case with the other AFL games of the weekend, the host Chicago Bulls and visiting Boston Bulldogs were in a scoreless deadlock in the fourth quarter before the home team prevailed, 23-0. This time, the lack of scoring was not generally due to a lack of offense as both teams had threatened to score before being thwarted by penalty or turnover. Rushing by Boston's Bill Cronin set up a missed field goal attempt by Joe McGlone. Chicago had apparent touchdowns nullified by officials' whistles. In the fourth quarter, Joey Sternaman kicked a field goal to start the scoring; after an out-of-bounds punt set up the Bulls on the Boston 38, a pass to Dick Romey, a run by White, and a 15-yard rush by Sternaman put Chicago in the end zone. Shortly afterward, Chicago's Harry Hall intercepted a pass, setting up a Sternaman-to-Romey touchdown pass on the next play.

==== Rock Island Independents at Brooklyn Horsemen, cancelled ====
Game scheduled for October 31, 1926, at Ebbets Field, Brooklyn, was cancelled due to inclement weather. It was the second consecutive cancelled home game for the financially shaky Horsemen.

==== Newark Demons at New York Yankees, cancelled ====
Game scheduled for October 31, 1926, at Yankee Stadium, New York, was cancelled due to Newark withdrawing from the AFL.

=== Week Seven ===
==== New York Yankees 35, Rock Island Independents 0 ====
November 2, 1926 – Yankee Stadium, New York, New York (attendance 30,000) Three days after crushing the previously-undefeated Quakers in Philadelphia, the New York Yankees returned home to obliterate the traveling Rock Island Independents, 35-0. Eddie Tryon intercepted two Rock Island passes (returning one of them 45 yards for a touchdown) as Pooley Hubert and Red Grange each had a rushing touchdown and George Pease threw two touchdown passes (one to Tryon, one to Larry Marks).

==== Philadelphia Quakers 24, Rock Island Independents 0 ====
November 6, 1926 – Sesquicentennial Stadium, Philadelphia, Pennsylvania (attendance 5000) A newly signed All-American Glenn Killinger started his AFL career by intercepting four passes as the host Philadelphia Quakers continued the Rock Island Independents' futility by pummeling the visitors, 24-0. While Killinger also had a touchdown catch for Philadelphia, the game was certainly not a one-man show as Bob Dinsmore passed for two touchdowns (to Dillinger and George Tully) and kicked a field goal and extra point. Charlie Way also had a touchdown run. Six interceptions proved to be Rock Island's undoing, while Vince McCarthy had a 40-yard run for the Independents in the final minutes. The game was originally scheduled to be between Philadelphia and Cleveland, but Rock Island filled in after the Panthers called it quits.

==== New York Yankees 21, Brooklyn Horsemen 13 ====
November 7, 1926 – Yankee Stadium, New York, New York (attendance 28,000) Eddie Tryon scored two touchdowns and Red Grange scored once as the host New York Yankees jumped to a 21-0 lead before defeating the visiting Brooklyn Horsemen, 21-13. Brooklyn's Earl Britton tossed a touchdown pass to Jim Flaherty as the Yankees put in their second string in the second quarter; Harry Stuhldreher followed up with a connection with Jim Bolger.

This was the last game in the AFL for the Brooklyn Horsemen. They subsequently merged with the NFL's Brooklyn Lions and finished the 1926 season in the more-established league. The merged team played one game as the Lions before playing three as the Horsemen... and then folded.

==== Los Angeles Wildcats 3, Chicago Bulls 3 ====
November 7, 1926 – Comiskey Park, Chicago, Illinois (attendance 7500) Two field goals were all the scoring as the host Chicago Bulls tied the Los Angeles Wildcats, 3-3. Although the score was deadlocked, the Wildcats outplayed the Bulls for most of the game. Five Los Angeles drives threatened touchdowns, but the Chicago defense allowed only one Dick Reed field goal. The Bulls showed no offense until a fourth quarter dropkick by Joey Sternaman knotted the score.

==== New York Yankees 28, Los Angeles Wildcats 0 ====
November 8, 1926 – Maple Leaf Stadium, Toronto, Ontario (attendance 10,000) In the first professional football game played outside the United States, the New York Yankees crushed the Los Angeles Wildcats, 28-0. Red Grange started the scoring with a 60-yard run in the third quarter. Red Maloney followed with two touchdown catches before Harry Fry scored on an interception return. Despite the lopsided score, the Wildcats' Jim Bradshaw was effective passing until team star back Wildcat Wilson was sidelined in the third quarter with an injury.

The relative popularity of this game led to Canadian football adopting the forward pass (which, at the time, was still banned in Canada; the game still more closely resembled its rugby ancestor) three years later.

=== Week Eight ===
==== Chicago Bulls 3, Philadelphia Quakers 0 ====
November 14, 1926 – Comiskey Park, Chicago, Illinois (attendance 2500) After seven straight Saturday home games, the Philadelphia Quakers traveled to Chicago for its first road game – and lost to the Chicago Bulls, 3-0, in a muddy Comiskey Park on a rainy Sunday afternoon. While the Quakers were unable to mount a challenge to the Bulls end zone all day, the Bulls had a bit more success in moving the ball. Joey Sternaman and Buck White had completed passes before Sternaman drop kicked a 26-yard field goal as time ran out in the first half.

==== New York Yankees 24, Boston Bulldogs 0 ====
November 14, 1926 – Yankee Stadium, New York, New York (attendance 20,000) Red Grange scored touchdowns three different ways (5-yard rush, 65-yard pass reception, 55-yard interception return) as the host New York Yankees shut out the visiting Boston Bulldogs in a game more noted for activity off the field. AFL President Bill Edwards was in attendance for the game and had to make a ruling after New York’s Art Coglizer kicked a field goal that completed the game’s scoring. The football flew into the bleachers, and when a fan refused to return it (there were only two available for play at the time), Edwards ruled that the spectator must give it back. Soon after the end of the game, the Boston Shamrocks joined Newark, Cleveland, and Brooklyn in exiting the AFL. The league that started the 1926 with nine teams was reduced to five.

=== Week Nine ===
==== Philadelphia Quakers 13, Los Angeles Wildcats 7 ====
November 20, 1926 – Sesquicentennial Stadium, Philadelphia, Pennsylvania (attendance 4000) A 56-yard punt return by Jim Dinsmore scored the deciding touchdown in the third quarter as the host Philadelphia Quakers defeated the traveling Los Angeles Wildcats, 13-7, in front of the smallest crowd to attend an AFL game in Sesquicentennial Stadium. Los Angeles took a 7-0 lead in the first quarter on a Wildcat Wilson touchdown dive. A second quarter interception by Philadelphia's George Tully led to an equalizing touchdown pass from Johnny Scott to Adrian Ford.

==== Los Angeles Wildcats 16, New York Yankees 6 ====
November 21, 1926 – Yankee Stadium, New York, New York (attendance 18,827) One day after losing a hard-fought battle in Philadelphia, the Los Angeles Wildcats returned to Yankee Stadium and knocked the host New York Yankees out of first place with a 16-6 victory. Two long Los Angeles drives in the first half were capped by Wildcat Wilson and Wes Bradshaw; a safety just before halftime increased the Wildcats' lead to 16-0. A third quarter pass from George Pease to Lowell Ottie provided the Yankees’ only score as a dropkick extra point attempt by Larry Marks was blocked.

==== Chicago Bulls 3, Rock Island Independents 0 ====
November 21, 1926 – Comiskey Park, Chicago, Illinois (attendance 1800) A snow-covered field hampered both teams' offenses as the home Chicago Bulls edged the Rock Island Independents, 3-0, with a 20-yard dropkick by Joey Sternaman providing the only points. A Marty Norton-to-Frank Coyle touchdown pass that apparently gave Rock Island a 7-3 was nullified when officials ruled Coyle out of bounds when he caught the ball. After the game, the Independents – charter members of both the AFL and the NFL – folded. The AFL has shrunk to four teams: the Philadelphia Quakers and three teams owned or bankrolled by Red Grange and C. C. Pyle: the New York Yankees, the Los Angeles Wildcats, and the Chicago Bulls.

=== Week Ten ===
==== Philadelphia Quakers 13, New York Yankees 10 ====
November 25, 1926 – Yankee Stadium, New York, New York (attendance 22,000) A Thanksgiving Day game in New York had more than the usual excitement as the league-leading Philadelphia Quakers came from behind with a fourth-quarter touchdown to defeat the host New York Yankees, 13-10. The first three quarters belonged to the kickers as Philadelphia's Al Kreuz booted two field goals and New York's Eddie Tryon hit one. The Yankees took a 10-6 lead in the fourth quarter when George Pease replaced an injured Red Grange and threw a pass to Tryon for a 26-yard gain. Passes to Pooley Hubert, Tryon, and Pease set up a short touchdown run by Tryon (who also kicked the extra point). The Quakers were not subdued: Pie Way replaced an ineffective Doc Elliott, and a few plays later, Way caught a pass from Johnny Scott and ran to the end zone on the deciding 40-yard play.

==== Los Angeles Wildcats 0, Chicago Bulls 0 ====
November 25, 1926 – Comiskey Park, Chicago, Illinois (attendance 3500) The AFL's second Thanksgiving Day game was a defensive struggle as the host Chicago Bears tied the traveling Los Angeles Wildcats, 0-0. Los Angeles struggled as Wildcat Wilson was sidelined with an injury for much of the game. Chicago's offense threatened to score several times, but were stopped by the Wildcats' front line. One sequence of plays typified the play of the day: Chicago's best offensive opportunity came after a Dick Romey recovered a Los Angeles fumble and returned the ball to the 15-yard line. On the next play, the Bulls fumbled, and the Wildcats' Jim Bradshaw recovered to end the threat.

==== Philadelphia Quakers 13, New York Yankees 6 ====
November 27, 1926 – Shibe Park, Philadelphia, Pennsylvania (attendance 15,000) The Philadelphia Quakers clinched the AFL title by beating the visiting New York Yankees, 13-6. An injured Red Grange stayed on the New York bench as Philadelphia exhibited the dominance possessed by a championship team. While local favorite Al Kreuz was injured in the game, Jim Dinsmore filled his kicking shoes by booting two field goals and an extra point after a Johnny Scott-to-Adrian Ford touchdown pass.

==== New York Yankees 7, Chicago Bulls 0 ====
November 28, 1926 – Yankee Stadium, New York, New York (attendance 15,000) Playing their third game in four days, a shorthanded New York Yankees defeated the host Chicago Bulls, 7-0, as an injured Red Grange stayed on the New York bench. A 23-yard pass from George Pease to Eddie Tryon provided all the points the visitors needed. Passes to Bullet Baker and Paul G. Goebel set up the score. Later in the game, Tryon had a 70-yard punt return for the Yankees.

=== Week Eleven ===
==== Los Angeles Wildcats 5, Chicago Bulls 0 ====
December 5, 1926 – Comiskey Park, Chicago, Illinois (attendance 3000) In a game dominated by freezing temperatures and an icy field, the traveling Los Angeles Wildcats bested the host Chicago Bulls, 5-0. Mal Bross returned the opening kickoff 45 yards; when the subsequent drive stopped, Los Angeles kicker Dick Reed booted a 25-yard field goal. While both teams were fumbling the ball with regularity, only Los Angeles seemed to be recovering with any efficiency. While Wildcat Wilson was nursing an injury, fellow Wildcat Ram Morrison showed deadly punting ability, having one kick stop dead at the Chicago one-yard line. When Chicago’s Buck White tried to kick the Bulls out of danger, he fumbled the snap and had to fall on the ball in the end zone for a safety in the third quarter. While the Wildcats were technically in existence at the end of the season (December 13), this was the last game in their short history.

=== Week Twelve ===
==== New York Yankees 7, Chicago Bulls 3 ====
December 13, 1926 – Comiskey Park, Chicago, Illinois (attendance 8000) While the AFL champion Philadelphia Quakers were playing an exhibition game against the NFL's New York Giants, the New York Yankees were defeating the host Chicago Bears, 7-0, in the last official game of the American Football League. There was no scoring in the first three quarters as the teams slipped, slid, and slopped through the fog, snow, and slush. In the fourth quarter, Sam Whiteman led the Bulls to the game's first score, a 20-yard dropkicked field goal by Joey Sternaman. After Bullet Baker handled the succeeding kickoff for the Yankees, he passed to Art Coglizer before Larry Marks rushed 43 yards for the deciding score.

As the New York Yankees started a barnstorming tour of the American South and West, the rest of the league folded. For the 1927 season, the Yankees joined the NFL in a lease agreement with New York Giants owner Tim Mara, who acquired the Brooklyn franchise in payment of debts. The contract signed by Mara and Yankees owner C. C. Pyle limited the number of Yankees home games to four in 1927.

== AFL-NFL Challenge Game ==
=== New York Giants 31, Philadelphia Quakers 0 ===
December 14, 1926 – Polo Grounds, New York, New York (attendance 5000) In an exhibition game between the AFL’s champion Philadelphia Quakers and the NFL’s sixth place New York Giants, the host Giants crushed the visitors 31–0 in a driving snowstorm. A first period field goal by Jack McBride gave the Giants an early 3–0 lead that stood into the second half. As conditions deteriorated, the Quakers had trouble hanging onto the ball as the opportunistic New Yorkers converted turnovers into points in the third and fourth quarters. McBride scored two touchdowns and all four extra points in the second half and the Giants' Jack Hagerty and Tillie Voss each crossed the goal line once as the Quakers were held to one first down in the game.

Scoring

Team	1	2	3	4	T
Philadelphia Quakers (AFL)	0	0	0	0	0
New York Giants (NFL)	3	0	14	14	31

== Wildcats-Yankees barnstorming tour ==
After the season, the Yankees and Wildcats went on a barnstorming tour of the Southern United States. After four games against each other, the Wildcats went to California to play two home games: one against the local Hollywood Generals in Los Angeles's Wrigley Field, and the second effectively becoming the West Coast AFL-NFL Challenge Game against the Los Angeles Buccaneers in San Francisco's Ewing Field. The Yankees also went to California, played three games against the Buccaneers and one against the Generals, and this resulted in their season extending all the way until February 1927, practically unheard of at that time.

This was the second barnstorming tour to feature Red Grange in as many years. The Chicago Bears had taken Grange on its own barnstorming tour at the end of their 1925-26 season.

- December 14: Wildcats 7, Yankees 7, at Atlanta, Georgia
- December 16: Yankees 14, Wildcats 3, at Birmingham, Alabama (attendance: 5000)
- December 22: Wildcats 34, Yankees 0, at Beaumont, Texas
- December 27: Yankees 20, Wildcats 14, at San Antonio, Texas (attendance: 3000)
- January 9: Wildcats 28, Generals 7, at Los Angeles (attendance: 10000)
- January 16: Buccaneers 30, Yankees 6, at Los Angeles (attendance: 20000)
- January 23: Yankees 48, Generals 2, at Los Angeles
- January 23: Wildcats 17, Buccaneers 0, at San Francisco (attendance: 11000)
- January 30: Yankees 14, Buccaneers 0, at Los Angeles (attendance: 10000)
- February 6: Buccaneers 7, Yankees 6, at San Francisco (attendance: 8500)

== See also ==
- 1926 NFL season
- 1926 AFL entry in Enciclopedia del football italiano (note that home teams are listed first)
