= New York Yankees (NFL) =

Defunct American football team

General information
- Founded: 1926
- Folded: 1929
- Stadium: Yankee Stadium
- Headquartered: New York, New York, United States
- Colors: Red, white, blue

Personnel
- Owner: C. C. Pyle
- Head coach: Ralph Scott (1926–1927); Dick Rauch (1928–1929)

Team history
- New York Yankees (1926–1929)

League / conference affiliations
- American Football League (1926); National Football League (1927–1929)

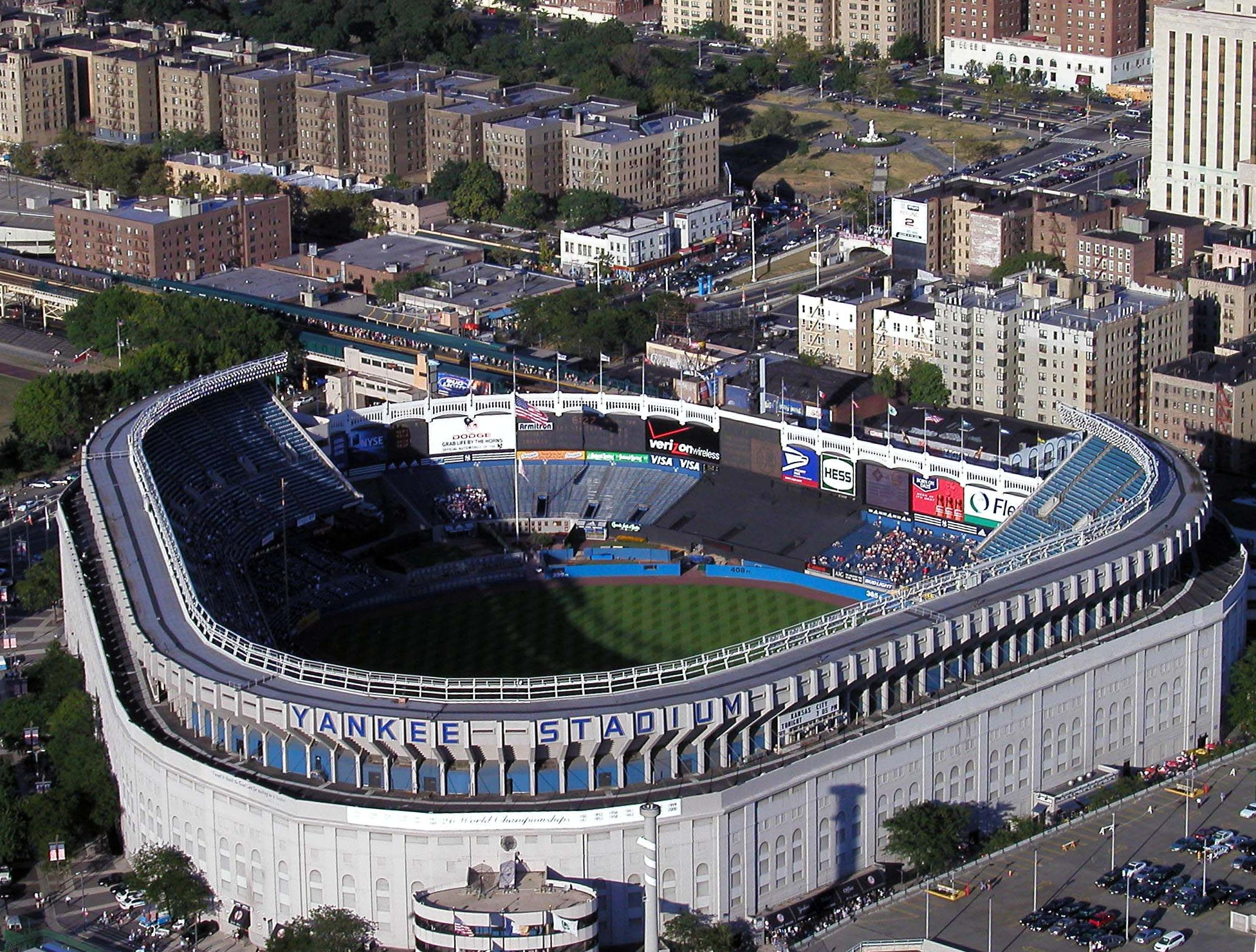

The New York Yankees were a short-lived professional American football team from 1926 to 1929. The team was a member of the first American Football League (AFL) in 1926, and later the National Football League (NFL) from 1927 to 1929. They played their home games at Yankee Stadium. The team featured Red Grange at halfback.

== History ==
=== Challenge to the NFL ===
The Yankees arose as a result of a contract dispute between Grange and his previous team, the NFL's Chicago Bears. During the early 1920s, Grange was the star attraction for the Bears, and his play had done a lot to promote the fledgling NFL. However Red's agent C. C. "Cash and Carry" Pyle challenged Bears owner George Halas in 1926, by stating that Red's contract was owned by himself, and not Halas. Pyle then approached Halas to demand for Grange a generous salary and one-third ownership of the Bears. Halas refused.

Pyle then took his quest for an NFL franchise to the NFL's 1926 winter meeting. There he showed to the other owners that he had the rights to Grange. As a result, he wanted an NFL team of his own and he wanted it to play in New York City's Yankee Stadium. If he would be denied, Pyle threatened to start his own league. However a franchise in the New York market was not available. Tim Mara held exclusive NFL rights to the New York Giants. Mara had just struggled through his first year as an owner, and was saved from financial disaster ironically by Grange's exhibition appearance. Nearing the end of their first season, the Giants had gone largely unnoticed by New York fans and newspapers, and Mara was deeply in the red. But Grange's appearance drew 73,000 people to the Polo Grounds; in one afternoon Mara was in the black financially, and professional football had gained new respect among New York's influential sportswriters. Now Pyle wanted to take away half of Mara's market.

=== Brooklyn compromise ===
The other franchise owners backed Mara, however they did not want to lose Grange and his drawing power. They were well aware of what a game against Grange could mean to their finances. They were also aware that Pyle might actually carry out a threat to start a new league if they refused his request. As a result, the league proposed a compromise. It was proposed that Pyle could have his "New York" franchise but it would be located in Brooklyn, which was a part of New York City. However, Pyle had already gone ahead and rented Yankee Stadium, and that was where he intended to play. Rejecting the NFL's offer, he set out to make good on his threat. With his new New York Yankees franchise as its flagship, Pyle put together a league called the American Football League.

=== 1926 season ===
Once the league was under way, Grange lived up to his reputation and drew well wherever he played. 22,000 spectators turned out in Philadelphia to watch the Yankees play the Philadelphia Quakers. In comparison, an NFL game a week later in the same stadium between the Frankford Yellow Jackets and the New York Giants drew only 10,000. Nevertheless, the AFL folded at the end of the season, but Pyle's Yankees were given the franchise in the NFL for which he originally asked.

=== NFL and Decline ===
While the bulk of the AFL disappeared with the demise of the league, two of its members had an official existence after the 1926 season. Although the Brooklyn Horsemen disbanded after its last NFL game, the team's franchise was never withdrawn or canceled by the league. Mara was awarded the Horsemen franchise in payment of a debt and proceeded to lease it to Pyle for his New York Yankees team. The agreement between the two rivals limited the number of home games that the Yankees were permitted to play in its namesake stadium (four in 1927) and forced to be primarily a road team displaying the talents of Red Grange. This arrangement lasted for three years: the Yankees were no more after the 1929 season. Grange played for the Yankees in 1927, however he sat out the next season with a bad leg, and then returned to the Bears where he played until 1934. He then coached the Bears from 1942 until 1948.

== Pro Football Hall of Famers ==
New York Yankees Hall of Famers
Players
No.	Name	Position	Tenure	Inducted
—	Morris Badgro	End	1927–1928	1981
—	Ray Flaherty	End	1927–1928	1976
—	Harold "Red" Grange	HB	1926–1927	1963
—	Mike Michalske	G/FB	1926–1928	1964

== Season-by-season ==
Year	W	L	T	Finish	Coach	League
1926	10	5	0	2nd	Ralph Scott	AFL
1927	7	8	1	6th	Ralph Scott	NFL
1928	4	8	1	7th	Dick Rauch	NFL
