= Chicago Bulls (AFL) =

American football team

General information
- Founded: 1926
- Folded: 1926
- Stadium: Comiskey Park
- Headquartered: Chicago, United States
- Colors: Black, Orange, White

Personnel
- Owner: Joey Sternaman
- Head coach: Joey Sternaman

League / conference affiliations
- American Football League (1926)

The Chicago Bulls were a professional American football team that competed in the first American Football League in 1926. Owned by Joey Sternaman (brother of Chicago Bears co-owner Dutch Sternaman), the Bulls also had AFL founders C. C. Pyle and Red Grange as shareholders (Pyle and Grange were also the co-owners of the New York Yankees and the Los Angeles Wildcats of the AFL). Joey Sternaman was also the coach and blocking back for the Bulls throughout their brief existence.

The newly minted Bulls had adverse effects on the more established NFL. First, the Bulls leased Comiskey Park, forcing the Chicago Cardinals to play in the (older and much smaller) Normal Field. Second, the Bulls made an offer for Cardinals star Paddy Driscoll that the reigning NFL champions could not match (Cardinals owner Chris O'Brien arranged a trade with the Bears, who did match the Bulls' offer to Driscoll, keeping him in the established league but knocking the Cardinals out of championship contention). Failing to sign Driscoll, the Bulls built up their roster by signing up men who played their college football in the American Midwest.

Despite playing in front of 16,000 people in their first home game (against the Yankees on October 17, 1926), the Bulls were generally a poor attraction despite the star power of Joey Sternaman. Most of the Bulls games – both at home and away – were played in front of 4,000 people or fewer. Attendance at Bulls games were often a reflection of the drawing power of their opponents. The team's first game (at Newark) was played in front of only 2,000 people in Davids' Stadium on September 26; the Bulls played the last three official games of the American Football League: in front of 15,000 in Yankee Stadium on November 28 against the Yankees, in front of 3,000 in Comiskey Park on December 5 against the Wildcats, and in front 8,000 in Comiskey Park on December 12 against the Yankees. With the conclusion of the last game, the AFL – and the Chicago Bulls – became history, and Sternaman returned to the Chicago Bears.

Year	W	L	T	Finish	Coach
1926	5	6	3	5th	Joey Sternaman

== After the first AFL ==
Upon the completion of a New York Yankees' 7–3 victory over the Bulls in Comiskey Park on December 12, 1926, the first AFL was officially dead. Although Joey Sternaman was the official owner of the team, the bills were paid by C. C. Pyle, who decided to cut his losses by dissolving his (and Red Grange's) interest in the team as the Yankees and the Wildcats went on a barnstorming tour of the American South and West Coast. As a result, the Bulls were no more viable as an entity than the AFL. Its fate was officially sealed when Sternaman returned to the Chicago Bears and the Yankees entered the National Football League (with New York Giants owner Tim Mara technically the owner in a lease arrangement for the defunct Brooklyn Lions franchise).

As Sternaman continued his career, he was not the only former Chicago Bull to join an NFL team's roster after the dissolution of the AFL:

Mush Crawford – 1927 New York Yankees
John Fahay – 1929 Minneapolis Red Jackets
Aubrey Goodman – 1927 Chicago Cardinals
Ojay Larson – 1929 Chicago Bears, 1929 Chicago Cardinals
Dick Stahlman – 1929 & 1930 New York Giants, 1931–1932 Green Bay Packers, 1933 Chicago Bears
Red Strader – 1927 Chicago Cardinals (later became head coach for the 1948–1949 New York Yankees (AAFC), 1950-51 New York Yanks (NFL), and 1955 San Francisco 49ers)
Jim Tays – 1927 Dayton Triangles, 1930 Newark Tornadoes, 1930 Staten Island Stapletons
Buck White – 1927–1929 Chicago Bears

While Garland Buckeye's professional football career ended with the folding of the Bulls, his major league baseball career continued, pitching for the Cleveland Indians in 1927–1928 and the New York Giants in 1928.
