= List of Georgia Institute of Technology athletes =

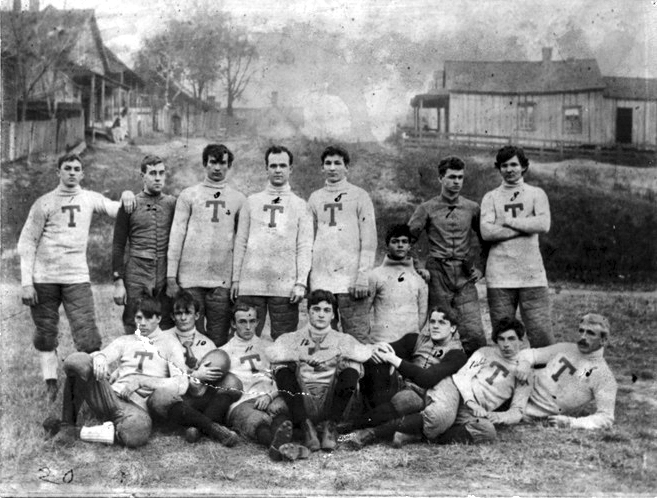
Georgia Tech's first football team

Georgia Institute of Technology has graduated many athletes. This includes graduates, non-graduate former students and current students of Georgia Tech who are notable for their achievements within athletics, sometimes before or after their time at Georgia Tech. Other alumni can be found in the list of Georgia Institute of Technology alumni; notable administration, faculty, and staff can be found on the list of Georgia Institute of Technology faculty. Intercollegiate sports teams at Georgia Tech are called "Yellow Jackets", and are run by the Georgia Tech Athletic Association. The Athletic Association runs Georgia Tech's Hall of Fame, which has inducted many of Tech's greatest players throughout the program's history.

Despite their technical backgrounds and courses of study, many Georgia Tech students participate in college athletics, outdoor activities and other forms of sport. Georgia Tech offers seventeen varsity sports: men's football, men's and women's basketball, men's baseball, women's softball, women's volleyball, men's golf, men's and women's tennis, men's and women's swimming and diving, men's and women's track and field, and men's and women's cross country. Approximately 150 Tech students have gone into the National Football League (NFL), with many others going into the National Basketball Association (NBA) or Major League Baseball (MLB). Some Tech players have also participated in the Olympic Games.

Well-known American football athletes include former students Calvin Johnson, Ken Whisenhunt, and Keith Brooking, former Tech head football coaches John Heisman, and Bobby Dodd, and all-time greats such as Joe Hamilton, Pat Swilling, Billy Shaw, and Joe Guyon. Tech's entrants into the NBA include Dennis Scott, Mark Price, John Salley, Stephon Marbury, and Chris Bosh. Award-winning baseball stars include Mark Teixeira, Nomar Garciaparra, and Jason Varitek. In golf, Bobby Jones founded The Masters, David Duval was ranked number 1 in the world in 2001, and Stewart Cink won the 2009 British Open.

== Olympics ==
Name	Class year	Notability	References
Derrick Adkins	1993	1996 Olympic gold medalist, track and field	
Júlia Bergmann	2022	2024 Olympic bronze medalist, volleyball	
Chris Bosh	2003	professional basketball player with the Miami Heat and former U.S. Olympic Team member (gold medal in men's basketball, 2008)	
Eric Giddens	1995	slalom canoer who finished 20th in the men's K-1 slalom event at the 1996 Summer Olympics in Atlanta	
Ed Hamm	1929	Tech Hall of Fame, won the gold medal in the long jump at the 1928 Summer Olympics held in Amsterdam, Netherlands	
Stephon Marbury	1996	former NBA professional basketball player and former U.S. Olympic Team member (bronze medal in men's basketball, 2004)	
Antonio McKay	1985	1984 Olympic gold and bronze medalist, track and field	
Derek Mills	1995	1996 Olympic gold medalist, track and field	
Caitlin Lever	2007	2008 Olympic softball	
Angelo Taylor	1998	2000 and 2008 Olympic gold medalist, track and field	

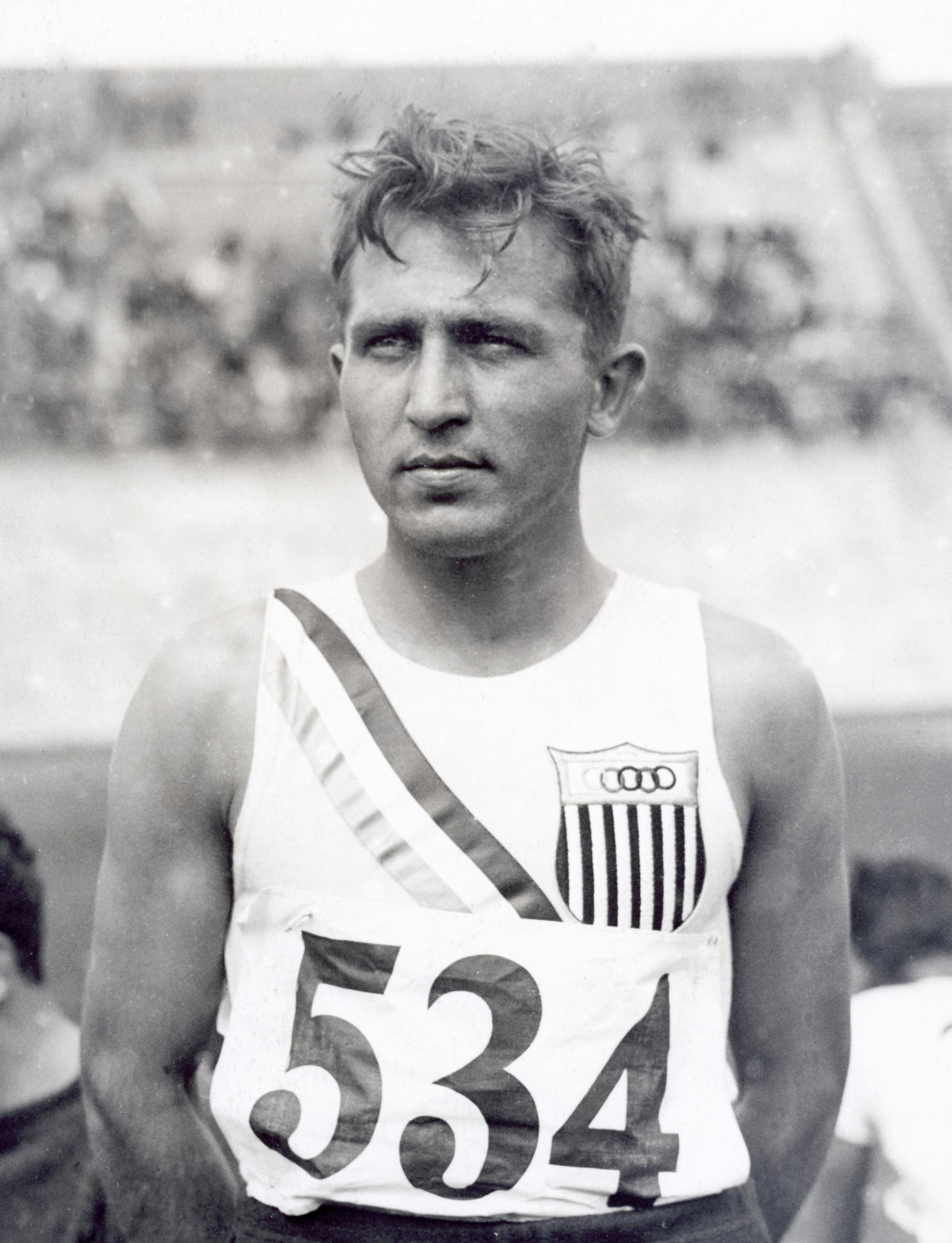
Ed Hamm, Tech Hall of Fame, 1928 Summer Olympics gold medalist

== American football ==
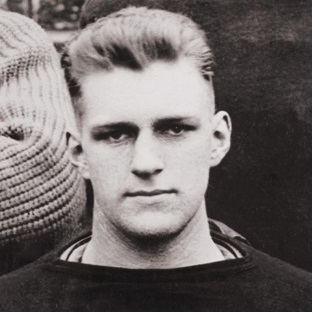
Walker Carpenter, captain of Tech's first national championship team, Tech Hall of Fame

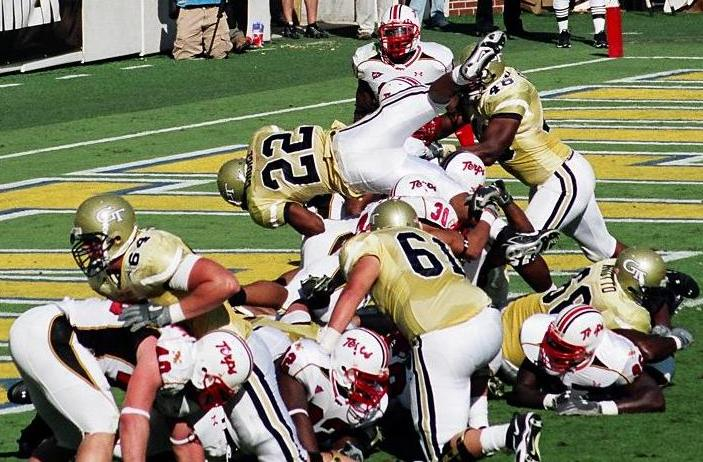
Tashard Choice, running back for the Yellow Jackets, scoring a touchdown

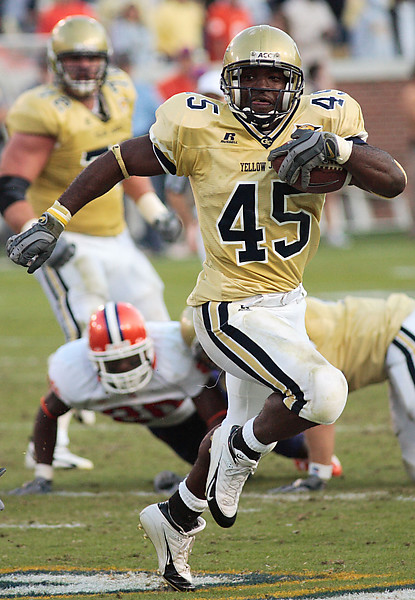
P. J. Daniels, running back for the Baltimore Ravens

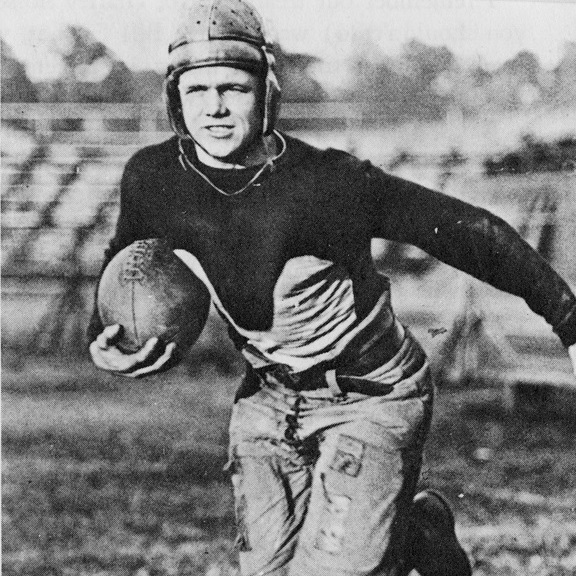
Buck Flowers, first Tech player in the College Football Hall of Fame, twice All-American and thrice All-Southern. Tech Hall of Fame

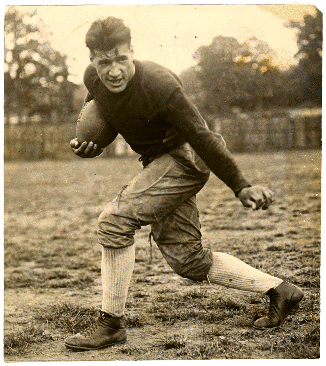
Joe Guyon, an American Indian and National Football League player, Tech Hall of Fame, Pro Football Hall of Fame

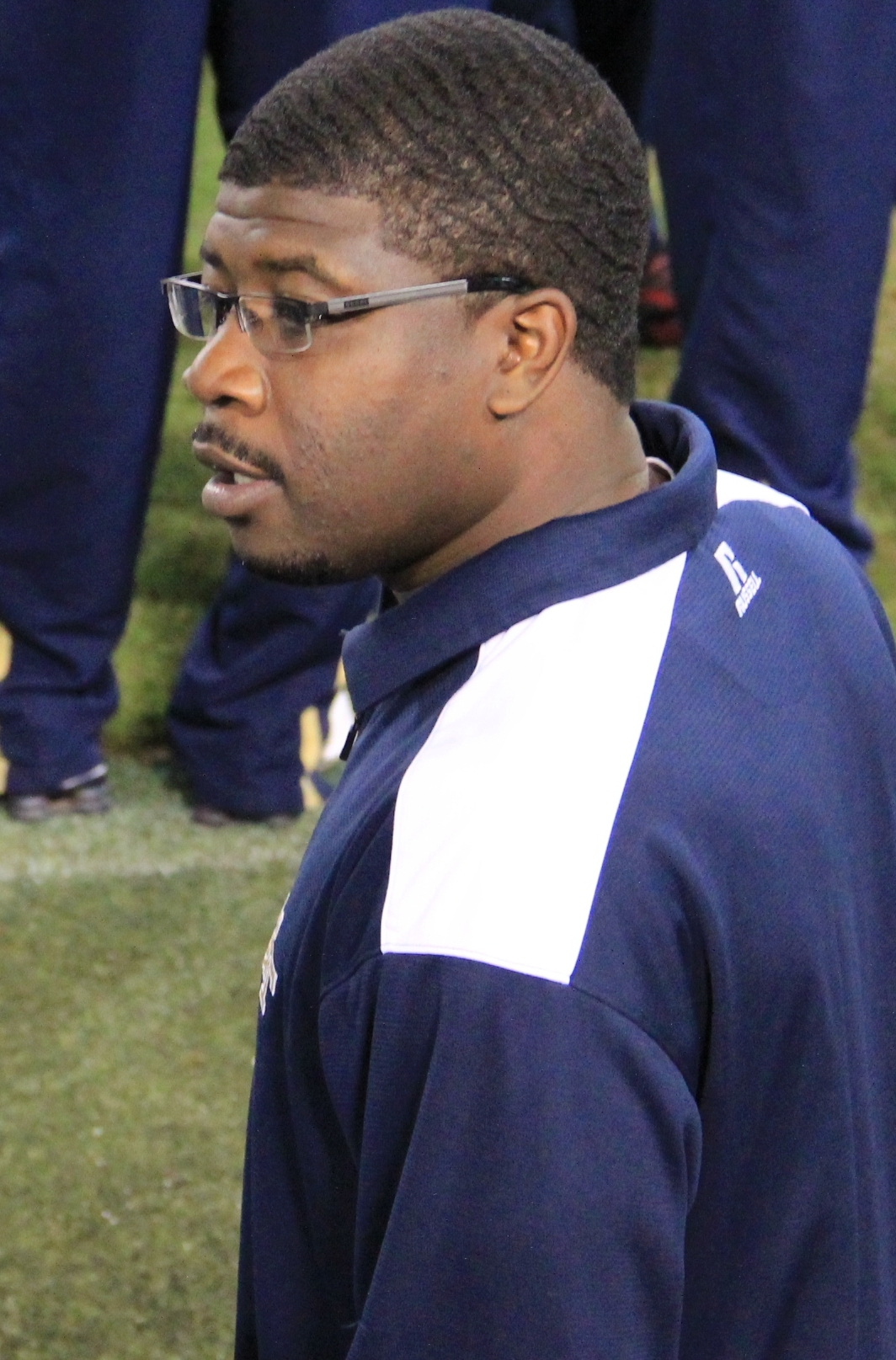
Joe Hamilton, 1999 1st Team All-American Quarterback and Heisman Trophy finalist

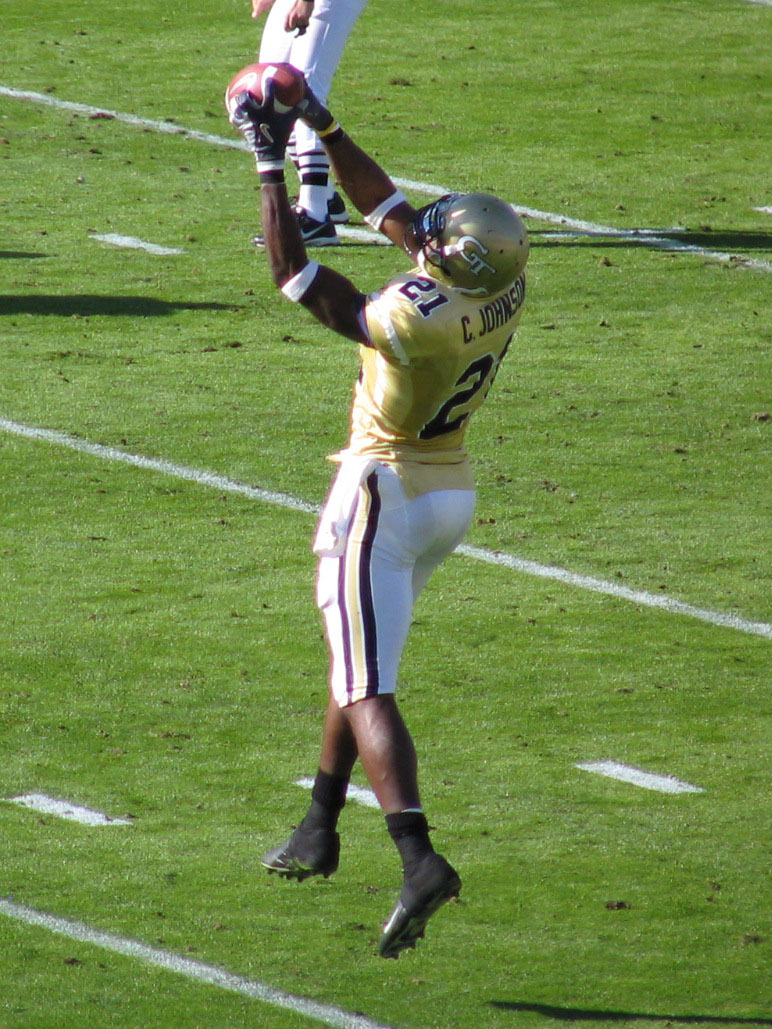
Calvin Johnson, wide receiver for the Yellow Jackets, unanimous first-team All-American, retired NFL player

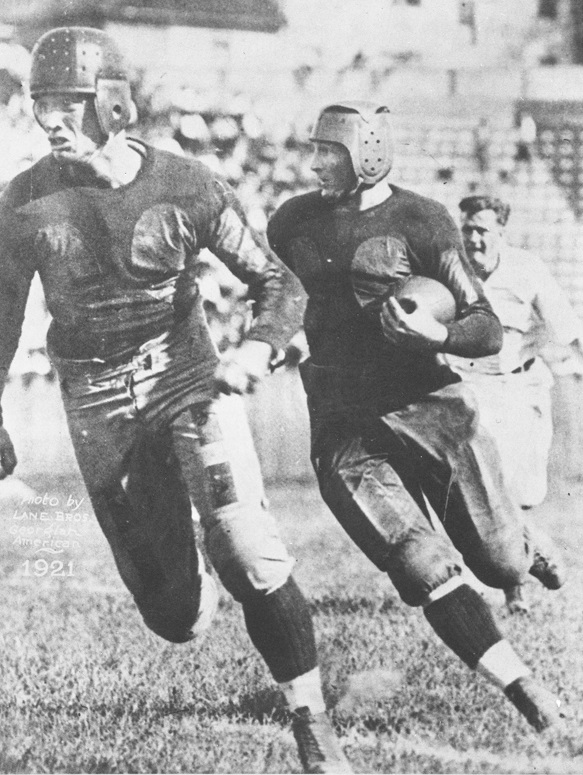
Judy Harlan blocking for Red Barron

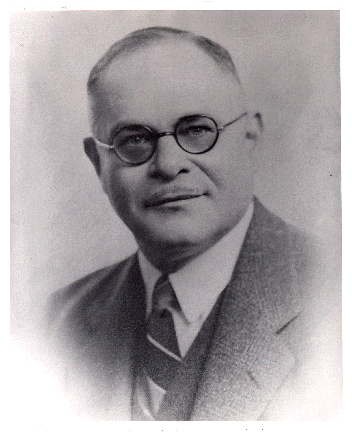
Al Loeb, Tech Hall of Fame; nicknamed "The Yiddish Wildcat"

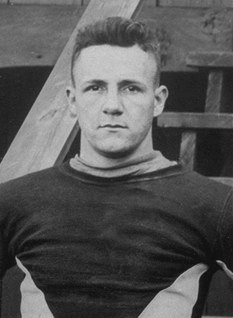
Everett Strupper, a small, deaf man, scored 8 touchdowns in the 222–0 rout of Cumberland, led the offensive attack of 1917 national champions. Twice Consensus All-American. College Football Hall of Fame. Georgia Sports Hall of Fame, Tech Hall of Fame.

Name	Class year	Position	Notability	Reference(s)
Taz Anderson	1960	Tight end	National Football League player, Tech Hall of Fame	
Joe Anoa'i	2006	Defensive tackle	2006 first-team All-ACC; now a professional wrestler in WWE under the name Roman Reigns	
Joe Auer	1964	Running back and kickoff returner	National Football League player	
Reggie Ball	2007	Quarterback	Tech's quarterback from 2003 to 2006	
Red Barron	1922	Halfback	three-sport letterwinner at Tech, Tech Hall of Fame (football), Tech All-Era Team (William Alexander era)	
Maxie Baughan	1959	Linebacker	National Football League player, Tech Hall of Fame, Tech All-Era Team (Bobby Dodd era), Tech All-Time Football Team	
Craig Baynham	1966	Running back	National Football League player	
Scott Beavers	1989	Guard and offensive tackle	National Football League player	
Ray Beck	1953	Guard	National Football League player, Tech Hall of Fame, Tech All-Era Team (Bobby Dodd era)	
Si Bell	1919	end	starter for 222 to 0 rout of Cumberland; member of Tech's first national championship team in 1917; twice All-Southern	
William Bell	1993	Running back	National Football League player	
Taylor Bennett	2008	Quarterback	backup quarterback, 2005–2006; starting quarterback, 2007	
Don Bessillieu	1978	Safety	National Football League player, Tech Hall of Fame, Tech All-Time Football Team	
Damarius Bilbo	2006	Wide receiver	National Football League player	
Tom Bleick	1965	Defensive back	National Football League player	
Jason Bostic	1998	Cornerback and safety	National Football League player	
John Brewer	1928	Guard and halfback	National Football League player	
Jimmy Brewster	1925	Quarterback	National Football League player	
Keith Brooking	1998	Linebacker	National Football League linebacker with the Atlanta Falcons	
Gary Brown	1993	Defensive tackle and guard	National Football League player	
Pete Brown	1952	Center and linebacker	National Football League player	
Frank Broyles	1946	Quarterback	Tech Hall of Fame, former NCAA football coach and broadcaster, and the athletic director for the Arkansas Razorbacks	
Jerry Burch	1960	End	National Football League player	
Joe Burns	2001	Running back	National Football League player	
Gerry Bussell	1964	Defensive back	National Football League player, Tech Hall of Fame	
James Butler	2004	Free safety	National Football League player	
Harrison Butker	2016	kicker	National Football League player for the Kansas City Chiefs	
Kelly Campbell	2001	Wide receiver	National Football League player	
Jon Carman	1999	Offensive tackle	National Football League player	
Walker Carpenter	1918	Tackle	captain of 1917 national championship team, Tech Hall of Fame, Georgia Sports Hall of Fame and the Helms Football Hall of Fame	
Clint Castleberry	1942	Halfback	Tech Hall of Fame, Heisman Trophy candidate whose plane was lost in World War II; his number, #19, is the only retired football jersey at Georgia Tech	
Bill Chambers	1944	Offensive tackle	National Football League player	
Michael Cheever	1995	Center	National Football League player	
Tashard Choice	2011	Running back	National Football League Player	
Willie Clay	1992	Cornerback and safety	National Football League player, Tech Hall of Fame	
Felipe Claybrooks	2000	Defensive end	National Football League player	
Marco Coleman	1992	Defensive end	National Football League player, Tech Hall of Fame	
Vaughan Connelly	1925	Defensive back and halfback	National Football League player	
Willis Crockett	1989	Linebacker	National Football League player	
Bill Curry	1964	Center and linebacker	National Football League player, Tech Hall of Fame, Tech All-Era Team (Bobby Dodd era), Tech All-Time Football Team and Tech Football head coach, current head coach at Georgia State University	
Shane Curry	1964	Defensive end	National Football League player	
P. J. Daniels	2005	Running back	National Football League player	
Steve Davenport	1990	Wide receiver	three-year starter and four-year letterman; current head football coach of the Savannah State Tigers football team	
Bob Davis	1947	Offensive tackle	National Football League player, Tech Hall of Fame, Tech All-Era Team (Bobby Dodd era)	
Donnie Davis	1995	Quarterback	Tech quarterback, professional player	
John Davis	1986	Guard	National Football League player, Tech All-Time Football Team, Tech Hall of Fame	
Oscar Davis	1922	Guard	Tech Hall of Fame, Tech All-Era Team (William Alexander era)	
Ted Davis	1963	Linebacker and tight end	National Football League player, Tech Hall of Fame, Tech All-Era Team (Bobby Dodd era)	
Tony Daykin	1976	Linebacker	National Football League player	
John Dewberry	1985	Quarterback	Tech Hall of Fame, Tech starting quarterback (1983–1985)	
Tom Dooley	1957	Official	American football official for 32 years	
Nat Dorsey	2003	Offensive tackle	National Football League player	
Paul Duke	1946	Center	National Football League player, Tech Hall of Fame	
Andrew Economos	2005	Long snapper	National Football League player for the Tampa Bay Buccaneers	
Randy Edmunds	1967	Linebacker	National Football League player, Tech All-Era Team (Carson-Fulcher-Rodgers era)	
Nick Ferguson	2005	Strong safety	National Football League safety with the Denver Broncos	
Bill Fincher	1920	Offensive tackle	College Football Hall of Fame, Tech Hall of Fame, Tech All-Era Team (John Heisman era)	
Buck Flowers	1920	Halfback	College Football Hall of Fame, Tech Hall of Fame, Tech All-Era Team (William Alexander era)	
Lee Flowers	1994	Defensive back	National Football League player	
Elliott Fortune	1995	Defensive end	National Football League player	
John Paul Foschi	2004	Tight end and h-back	National Football League player	
Keyaron Fox	2003	Linebacker	National Football League player	
Russell Freeman	1991	Guard and offensive tackle	National Football League player	
Bill Fulcher	1955	Guard and linebacker	National Football League player and Tech Football Head Coach	
Bill Giaver	1921	Fullback and halfback	National Football League player	
Ellis Gardner	1982	Offensive tackle	National Football League player	
Walt Godwin	1928	Guard	Tech Hall of Fame, Tech All-Era Team (Carson-Fulcher-Rodgers era), All-American	
Jerry Green	1959	Halfback	National Football League player	
Rufus Guthrie	1962	Guard	Tech All-Time Football Team	
Joe Guyon	1918	Running back	National Football League player, Tech Hall of Fame, Tech All-Era Team (John Heisman era), Pro Football Hall of Fame	
Gary Guyton	2008	Linebacker	National Football League player for the New England Patriots	
Andy Hall	2005	Quarterback	National Football League player	
Joe Hamilton	2000	Quarterback	1999 1st Team All-America Quarterback and Heisman Trophy finalist, currently with the Orlando Predators of the Arena Football League	
Harvey Hardy	1942	Guard	National Football League player, Tech Hall of Fame, Tech All-Era Team (William Alexander era), All-American	
Anthony Hargrove	2003	Defensive end	National Football League player	
Steve Harkey	1970	Running back	National Football League player	
Judy Harlan	1921	Fullback	Tech Hall of Fame, All-Southern	
Joe Harris	1974	Linebacker	National Football League player, Tech Hall of Fame	
Anthony Harrison	1986	Safety	National Football League player	
Will Heller	2002	Tight end	National Football League player	
Jack Helms	1945	Defensive end, halfback, and tackle	National Football League player	
Eric Henderson	2005	Linebacker	National Football League player with the Cincinnati Bengals	
David Hendrix	1994	Safety	National Football League player	
Bunky Henry	1966	Placekicker	Tech Hall of Fame, Tech All-Era Team (Bobby Dodd era)	
Urban Henry	1960	Defensive end and defensive tackle	National Football League player	
Drew Hill	1978	Wide receiver	National Football League player, Tech All-Time Football Team, Tech Hall of Fame	
Kent Hill	1980	Guard	National Football League player, Tech All-Time Football Team, Tech Hall of Fame	
Tony Hollings	2002	Running back	National Football League player	
Reuben Houston	2005	Cornerback	Georgia Tech cornerback charged with conspiring to distribute 94 pounds of marijuana; later signed by the Tampa Bay Buccaneers	
Eddie Lee Ivery	1978	Running back	National Football League running back with the Green Bay Packers, Tech All-Time Football Team, Tech Hall of Fame, Tech All-Era Team (Carson-Fulcher-Rodgers era)	
Calvin Johnson	2007	Wide receiver	2x All-American, 3x All-ACC, Georgia Tech record holder for receiving yards, picked number two overall by the Detroit Lions in the 2007 NFL draft	
Henry Johnson	1979	Linebacker	National Football League player	
Shawn Jones	1992	Quarterback and safety	National Football League player, Tech Hall of Fame	
Mike Kelley	1981	Quarterback	National Football League player, Tech Hall of Fame	
Kim King	1968	Quarterback	Tech Hall of Fame, Tech All-Era Team (Carson-Fulcher-Rodgers era), Atlanta developer, author, and college football radio analyst	
Dawan Landry	2005	Safety	National Football League player	
Rick Lantz	1972	Tackle	Tech All-Era Team (Carson-Fulcher-Rodgers era)	
Robert Lavette	1984	Running back	National Football League player, Tech All-Time Football Team, Tech Hall of Fame	
Gary Lee	1986	Wide receiver	National Football League player	
Dorsey Levens	1993	Running back	National Football League player	
Sammy Lilly	1988	Cornerback and safety	National Football League player	
Al Loeb	1914	Center	Tech Hall of Fame	
Billy Lothridge	1963	Punter, safety and quarterback	National Football League All-Pro, Tech All-Era Team (Bobby Dodd era), Tech All-Time Football Team, Tech Hall of Fame	
Roy Lumpkin	1929	Fullback, halfback, and quarterback	National Football League player	
Dave Lutz	1982	Guard and offensive tackle	National Football League player, Tech Hall of Fame	
Ralph Malone	1985	Defensive end	National Football League player	
Billy Martin	1964	Punter and tight end	All-American, National Football League player, Tech All-Time Football Team, Tech Hall of Fame	
Clay Matthews	1949	Offensive tackle and defensive end	National Football League player	
Michael Matthews	2007	Tight end	National Football League player with the New York Giants	
Jerry Mays	1989	Running back	National Football League player, Tech Hall of Fame	
Eddie McAshan	1972	Quarterback	Tech Hall of Fame, Tech quarterback, first African American to start at quarterback for a major Southeastern university	
Pat McHugh	1946	Halfback	National Football League player, Tech Hall of Fame	
Hal Miller	1953	Tackle	National Football League player, Tech Hall of Fame, Tech All-Era Team (Bobby Dodd era), co-captain of Georgia Tech's 1952 football team; this team, with a 12-0-0 record, won the 1953 Sugar Bowl and were the SEC champions	
Warner Mizell	1929	Fullback and halfback	National Football League player, Tech Hall of Fame	
Mike Mooney	1992	Offensive tackle	National Football League player	
Pat Moriarty	1978	Running back	National Football League player	
George Morris	1952	Center and linebacker	National Football League Player, College Football Hall of Fame, Tech Hall of Fame, Tech All-Era Team (Bobby Dodd era), Tech All-Time Football Team, All-American	
Larry Morris	1954	Linebacker, center, and fullback	National Football League player, Tech Hall of Fame, Tech All-Era Team (Bobby Dodd era), Tech All-Time Football Team	
Fred Murphy	1959	End	National Football League player	
Najee Mustafaa (aka Reggie Rutland)	1986	Safety, cornerback	National Football League player, Tech All-Time Football Team	
Ed Nutting	1960	Offensive tackle	National Football League player	
Ken Owen	1956	Fullback	Tech Hall of Fame, Tech All-Era Team (Bobby Dodd era)	
Craig Page	1999	Center	National Football League player	
Bill Paschal	1942	Running back	National Football League player	
Don Patterson	1978	Cornerback	National Football League player	
Pup Phillips	1919	Center	starter for 222 to 0 rout of Cumberland and Tech's first national championship team in 1917; Tech Hall of Fame	
Mark Pike	1986	Linebacker and defensive end	National Football League player	
Zach Piller	1998	Guard	National Football League player	
Bosh Pritchard	1941	Running back	National Football League player	
Eddie Prokop	1943	Fullback and halfback	National Football League player, Tech Hall of Fame	
Peter Pund	1928	Center	College Football Hall of Fame, Georgia Sports Hall of Fame, Tech Hall of Fame, Tech All-Era Team (William Alexander era)	
Steve Raible	1975	Wide receiver	National Football League player, Tech Hall of Fame, Tech All-Era Team (Carson-Fulcher-Rodgers era)	
Chris Reis	2006	Safety	National Football League player	
Randy Rhino	1974	Defensive back	Tech Hall of Fame, College Football Hall of Fame, Tech All-Time Football Team, Tech All-Era Team (Carson-Fulcher-Rodgers era)	
Al Richardson	1979	Linebacker	National Football League player, Tech All-Era Team (Carson-Fulcher-Rodgers era)	
L. W. "Chip" Robert, Jr.	1908	Quarterback	Captain of the Georgia Tech football, baseball, and cross country teams, and earned 15 varsity letters; Tech Hall of Fame, Georgia Sports Hall of Fame (1989)	
Jimmy Robinson	1974	Wide receiver	National Football League player, Tech All-Era Team (Carson-Fulcher-Rodgers era), Tech All-Time Football Team, Tech Hall of Fame	
Pepper Rodgers	1953	Quarterback	Tech Hall of Fame, Tech All-Era Team (Bobby Dodd era), Tech football Head Coach 1974–1979	
Charlie Rogers	1998	Running back and wide receiver	National Football League player	
Corky Rogers	1965	Defensive back and wide receiver	Winningest Florida high school football coach: 423-73-1 with 10 state championships	
Nick Rogers	2001	Linebacker	National Football League player	
Ted Roof	1985	Linebacker	Tech Hall of Fame, Head Football Coach at Duke University	
Coleman Rudolph	1992	Defensive end	National Football League player	
Jack Rudolph	1959	Linebacker	National Football League player	
Lucius Sanford	1977	Linebacker	National Football League player, Tech Hall of Fame, Tech All-Time Football Team, Tech All-Era Team (Carson-Fulcher-Rodgers era)	
Billy Shaw	1960	Guard	National Football League player, Tech Hall of Fame, Tech All-Era Team (Bobby Dodd era), Tech All-Time Football Team, Pro Football Hall of Fame	
Billy Shields	1974	Tackle	National Football League player, Tech Hall of Fame, Tech All-Era Team (Carson-Fulcher-Rodgers era)	
Dave Simmons	1964	Cornerback	National Football League player	
Roy Simmons	1978	Guard	National Football League player	
David Sims	1974	Running back	National Football League player, Tech Hall of Fame, Tech All-Era Team (Carson-Fulcher-Rodgers era)	
Scott Sisson	1992	Placekicker	National Football League player, Tech All-Time Football Team, Tech Hall of Fame	
Daryl Smith	2003	Linebacker	National Football League player	
Jonathan Smith	2003	Wide receiver	National Football League player	
Sean Smith	1989	Defensive end	National Football League player	
Lum Snyder	1952	Offensive tackle	National Football League player, Tech Hall of Fame, Tech All-Era Team (Bobby Dodd era)	
Larry Stallings	1962	Linebacker	National Football League player, Tech Hall of Fame, Tech All-time Football Team, Tech All-Era Team (Bobby Dodd era)	
John Steber	1946	Guard	National Football League player, Tech Hall of Fame	
Rod Stephens	1988	Linebacker	National Football League player	
Ryan Stewart	1995	Safety	National Football League player	
Jim Still	1947	Defensive back	National Football League player	
Rick Strom	1988	Quarterback	National Football League player	
Everett Strupper	1917	Halfback	College Football Hall of Fame, Tech Hall of Fame, Tech All-Era Team (John Heisman era)	
A.J. Suggs	2004	Quarterback	Tech starting quarterback	
Ken Swilling	1991	Safety	Tech Hall of Fame, Tech All-Time Football Team	
Pat Swilling	1985	Linebacker	Tech All-Time Football Team, Tech Hall of Fame, 5-time National Football League Pro-Bowl linebacker and former Defensive Player of the Year	
Jim Bob Taylor	1982	Quarterback	National Football League player	
Tom Taylor	1986	Guard	National Football League player	
Demaryius Thomas	2011	Wide receiver	National Football League player, Super Bowl champion	
Stumpy Thomason	1929	Fullback, halfback, and quarterback	National Football League player, Tech Hall of Fame, Tech All-Era Team (William Alexander era)	
Calvin Tiggle	1990	Linebacker	National Football League player	
Travares Tillman	1999	Safety	National Football League player	
Ben Utt	1943	Guard	National Football League player	
Carl Vereen	1956	Tackle	National Football League player	
Tevin Washington	2012	Quarterback	Tech starting quarterback	
Gordon Watkins	1929	Guard and tackle	National Football League player	
Dave Watson	1963	Guard	National Football League player, Tech Hall of Fame	
Ken Whisenhunt	1990	Tight end	Head Coach of the Arizona Cardinals after being a long-time offensive coordinator of the recent Super Bowl XL champion Pittsburgh Steelers; former National Football League player	
Dez White	1999	Wide receiver	National Football League player	
Reggie Wilkes	1977	Linebacker	National Football League player, Tech Hall of Fame, Tech All-Era Team (Carson-Fulcher-Rodgers era)	
Gary Wilkins	1985	Fullback and tight end	National Football League player	
Gerris Wilkinson	2005	Linebacker	National Football League player	
Clyde Williams	1934	Guard and tackle	National Football League player	
Ike Williams	1925	Halfback, quarterback, and placekicker	National Football League player	
Rodney Williams	2000	Punter	National Football League player	
Doug Wycoff	1925	Fullback, halfback, and quarterback	National Football League player, Tech Hall of Fame, Tech All-Era Team (William Alexander era)	
Chris Young	2002	Defensive back	National Football League player	
Frank Ziegler	1948	Halfback	National Football League player	

== Basketball ==
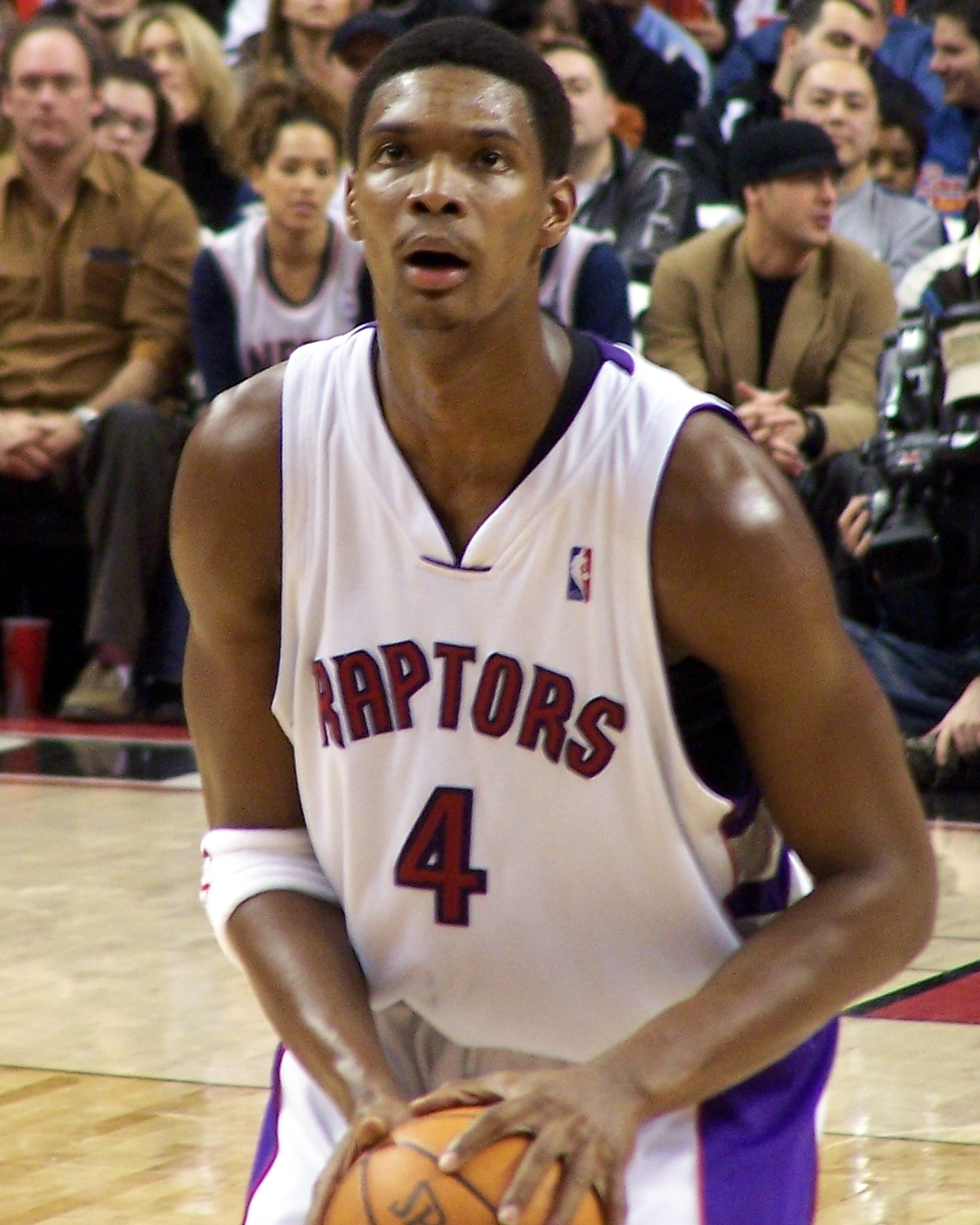
Chris Bosh, retired professional basketball player in the National Basketball Association for the Toronto Raptors and the Miami Heat

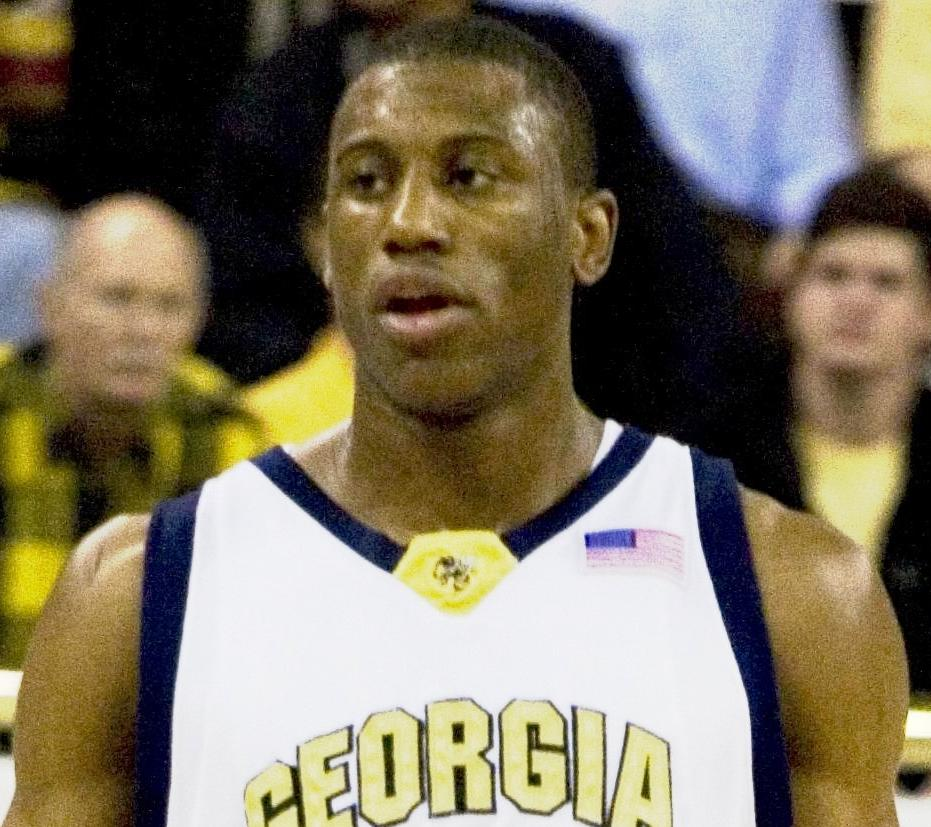
Thaddeus Young, current player for the Toronto Raptors

Name	Class year	Position	Notability	Reference(s)
Kenny Anderson	1991	Point guard	National Basketball Association player, Tech Hall of Fame	
Drew Barry	1996	Shooting guard	National Basketball Association player	
Jon Barry	1992	Shooting guard	former National Basketball Association player, television analyst for ESPN	
Travis Best	1995	Point guard	former National Basketball Association player, Tech Hall of Fame	
Chris Bosh	2003	Power forward	National Basketball Association player for the Miami Heat	
Niesha Butler	2002	Shooting guard	won several All-ACC awards	
Will Bynum	2005	Point guard	National Basketball Association player Detroit Pistons, Israeli Basketball Premier League	
Jim Caldwell	1967	Center	Tech Hall of Fame, former National Basketball Association player	
Jason Collier	2000	Power forward	former National Basketball Association player; first active National Basketball Association player to die since Malik Sealy in 2000; his jersey (#40) was retired by the Atlanta Hawks	
Javaris Crittenton	2007	Point guard	former Tech player, former point guard for the Washington Wizards and the Memphis Grizzlies of the National Basketball Association	
Ed Elisma	1997	Center	National Basketball Association and Israel Basketball Premier League player	
Derrick Favors	2010	Center	National Basketball Association player	
Duane Ferrell	1988	Small forward	Tech Hall of Fame, former National Basketball Association player with the Atlanta Hawks and others	
James Forrest	1995	Center	led Yellow Jackets to the 1993 ACC title, player with the Euroleague's Olympiacos BC (2001–2002)	
Matt Geiger	1992	Center	former National Basketball Association player for the Miami Heat	
Dion Glover	1999	Shooting guard	former National Basketball Association player	
Tom Hammonds	1989	Power forward	Tech Hall of Fame, former National Basketball Association player with the Denver Nuggets, Golden State Warriors and others	
Matt Harpring	1998	Small forward	National Basketball Association player with the Utah Jazz	
Jarrett Jack	2005	Point guard	National Basketball Association player for the Brooklyn Nets and 22nd pick in the 2005 National Basketball Association draft	
Alvin Jones	2001	Center	former National Basketball Association player	
Yvon Joseph	1985	Center	former National Basketball Association player	
Roger Kaiser	1961	Guard	Tech Hall of Fame, All-American, former National Basketball Association player, 4-time NAIA National Champion Coach	
Gani Lawal	2010	Power forward	National Basketball Association player	
Malcolm Mackey	1993	Power forward	Tech Hall of Fame, former National Basketball Association player	
Stephon Marbury	1996	Point guard	former National Basketball Association and Chinese Basketball Association player, former U.S. Olympic Team member	
Anthony McHenry	2005	Small forward	professional basketball player, most recently signed to the Fort Worth Flyers in the NBA Development League	
Anthony Morrow	2007	Small forward	currently playing for the NBA's Oklahoma City Thunder	
Craig Neal	1988	Guard	former National Basketball Association player, current assistant head coach at the University of Iowa	
Ivano Newbill	1994	Forward	former National Basketball Association player	
Jim Nolan	1949	Center	Tech Hall of Fame, former National Basketball Association player	
Josh Okogie	2018	Shooting guard	National Basketball Association player	
Brian Oliver	1990	Small forward	Tech Hall of Fame, former National Basketball Association player	
Mark Price	1986	Point guard	Tech Hall of Fame; former National Basketball Association All-Pro point guard with the Cleveland Cavaliers; U.S. Olympic Team member	
John Salley	1986	Power forward	Tech Hall of Fame, former National Basketball Association player with the Detroit Pistons, Los Angeles Lakers and others, and current television personality	
Luke Schenscher	2005	Center	former NBA player with the Chicago Bulls and Portland Trail Blazers; currently plays in the Queensland Basketball League for the Townsville Heat in his native Australia; played in Australia's National Basketball League for the Perth Wildcats, Townsville Crocodiles and his home town team the Adelaide 36ers; former Australian Boomers international representative	
Dennis Scott	1990	Small forward	Tech Hall of Fame, former National Basketball Association player who set National Basketball Association records for most three-point shots made in a season, in a game, and in a half for the Orlando Magic	
Iman Shumpert	2011	Shooting guard	ACC All-Freshman Team, ACC All-Defensive Team, Georgia Tech record holder in steals per game, current National Basketball Association player	
Brook Steppe	1982	Guard	former National Basketball Association player	
Fred Vinson	1994	Guard	former National Basketball Association player	
Phil Wagner	1968	Guard	Tech Hall of Fame, former National Basketball Association player	
Mario West	2006	Guard	former professional basketball player for the Atlanta Hawks and New Jersey Nets, currently Director of Player Personnel for the Tech men's basketball program	
Avi Schafer	2017	Center	National Basketball Association player, competed at 2019 FIBA Basketball World Cup	
Thaddeus Young	2019	Small forward	National Basketball Association player with the Chicago Bulls	

- Alade Aminu (born 1987), Nigerian-American basketball player, 2015–16 Israel Basketball Premier League rebounding leader
- James Banks III (born 1998), basketball player
- Robert Carter (born 1994), basketball player in the Israeli Basketball Premier League
- Adam Smith (born 1992), basketball player for Hapoel Holon in the Israel Basketball Premier League

== Baseball ==
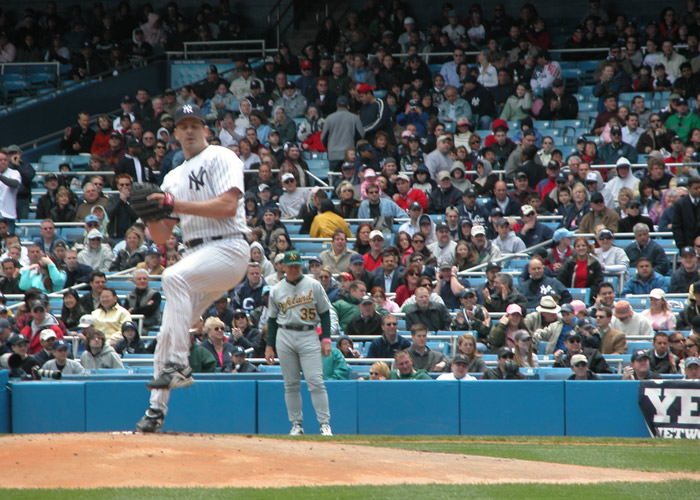
Kevin Brown, Tech Hall of Fame, former Major League Baseball right-handed starting pitcher

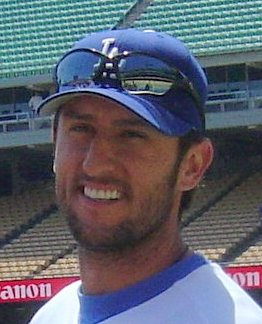
Nomar Garciaparra, Major League Baseball first baseman for the Los Angeles Dodgers

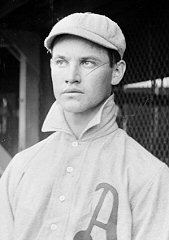
Weldon Henley, Tech's first player to go into the majors

Ed Lafitte, Tech Hall of Fame, former Major League Baseball pitcher

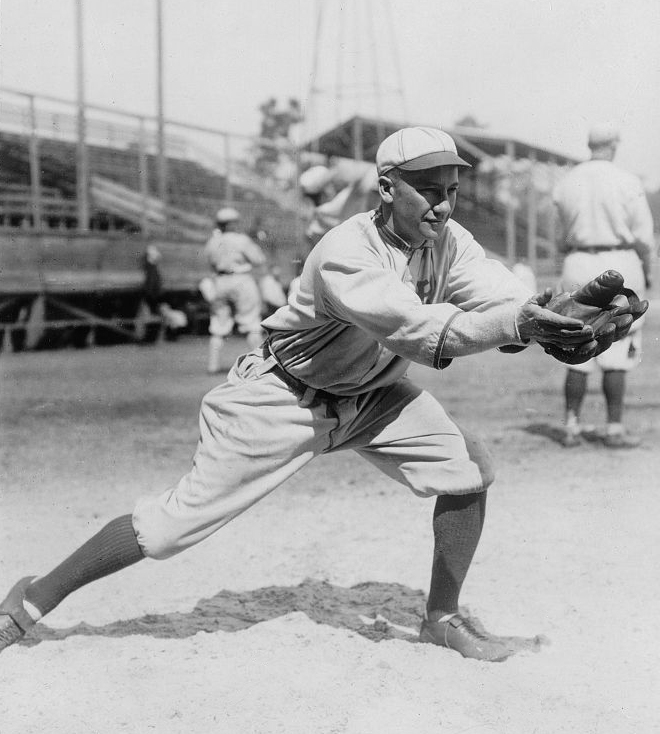
Del Pratt, Major League Baseball player with the St. Louis Browns in 1912

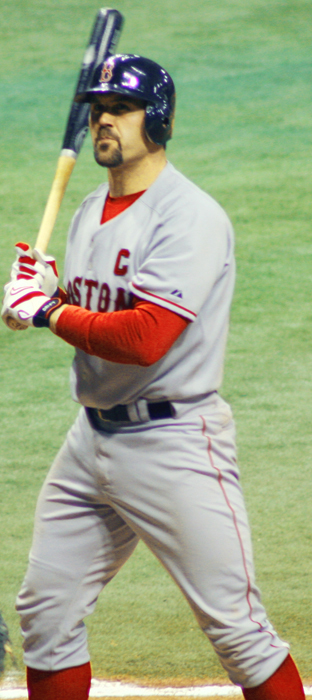
Jason Varitek, Tech Hall of Fame, All-Star baseball player and captain of the Boston Red Sox, Gold Glove winner, and Silver Slugger Award winner

Name	Class year	Position	Notability	Reference(s)
Horace Allen	1919	Outfielder	Major League Baseball player	
Tom Angley	1927	Catcher	Tech Hall of Fame, Major League Baseball player	
Red Barron	1922	Outfielder	three-sport letterwinner at Tech, Tech Hall of Fame (football), Major League Baseball player with the Boston Braves	
Joey Bart	2018	Catcher	2nd overall pick of the 2018 Major League Baseball draft by the San Francisco Giants, 2018 recipient of the Buster Posey Award for the top catcher in collegiate baseball	
Mike Bell	1991	First baseman	attended Tech during the off-season while playing for the Atlanta Braves	
Charlie Bishop	1955	Pitcher	Major League Baseball player	
Ray Blemker	1959	Pitcher	Tech Hall of Fame, Major League Baseball player	
Frank Bolick	1987	Infielder	Major League Baseball player	
Jung Keun Bong	2003	Pitcher	studied English as a foreign language at Tech while with the Atlanta Braves	
Cam Bonifay	1974	General manager	Tech Hall of Fame, general manager of the Pittsburgh Pirates from 1993 to 2001	
Darren Bragg	1991	Outfielder	Tech Hall of Fame, former Major League Baseball outfielder	
Kevin Brown	1986	Pitcher	Tech Hall of Fame, former All-Star Major League Baseball pitcher for the Los Angeles Dodgers, Florida Marlins	
Marlon Byrd	1999	Center fielder	Major League Baseball player with the Boston Red Sox	
Bill Calhoun	1911	Infielder	Major League Baseball player	
Kevin Cameron	2001	Pitcher	Major League Baseball player with the San Diego Padres	
Lew Carpenter	1935	Pitcher	Major League Baseball player	
Bruce Chen	2000	Pitcher	professional baseball player, attended Tech in the off-season	
Doug Creek	1991	Pitcher	Tech Hall of Fame, former Major League Baseball player	
Ed Crowley	1927	Infielder	Major League Baseball player	
Brandon Cumpton	2010	Pitcher	Major League Baseball player	
Claud Derrick	1914	Infielder	Major League Baseball player	
Bobby Dews	1961	Infielder	former infielder in Minor League Baseball and a coach in Major League Baseball	
Todd Dunn	1997	Outfielder	attended Tech as a scholarship football player (did not play baseball at Tech)	
David Elder	1997	Pitcher	Major League Baseball player	
Tristin English	2019	First baseman	Major League Baseball player in the Arizona Diamondbacks organization	
Buck Farmer	2013	Pitcher	Major League Baseball player, previously with the Atlanta Braves and the Brewers, now with the Detroit Tigers	
Nomar Garciaparra	1994	Infielder	Tech Hall of Fame, 6-time All-Star baseball player and Rookie of the Year winner, 1997 Silver Slugger Award winner, played 14 seasons in MLB with the Boston Red Sox, Chicago Cubs, and Los Angeles Dodgers	
Ty Griffin	1988	Second baseman	Olympic gold medalist, Tech Hall of Fame, played professionally in minor league baseball	
Joe Guyon	1918	Outfielder	Minor League player, coach of the Clemson Tigers baseball team from 1928 to 1931	
Jim Hearn	1941	Pitcher	Major League Baseball player	
Weldon Henley	1901	Pitcher	Major League Baseball player	
Riccardo Ingram	1987	Outfielder	Tech Hall of Fame, Major League Baseball player	
Dick Jones	1927	Pitcher	Major League Baseball player	
Scott Jordan	1985	Outfielder	Tech Hall of Fame, Major League Baseball player	
Ed Lafitte	1907	Pitcher	Tech Hall of Fame, former Major League Baseball pitcher	
Russ Lyon	1933	Catcher	Major League Baseball player	
Marty Marion	1940	Shortstop	Major League Baseball player (did not play at Tech)	
Erskine Mayer	1909	Pitcher	Major League Baseball player	
Sam Mayer	1915	Outfielder	Major League Baseball player	
Tommy McMillan	1906	Shortstop	Major League Baseball player	
Scrappy Moore	1913	Third baseman	Major League Baseball player	
Matt Murton	2005	Outfielder	Major League Baseball player with the Oakland A's and formerly with the Chicago Cubs	
David Newhan	1993	Outfielder	Major League Baseball player	
Mike Nickeas	2004	Catcher	Major League player for the New York Mets	
Micah Owings	2004	Pitcher	Major League Baseball player for the Cincinnati Reds	
Daniel Palka	2013	Outfielder	Major League Baseball player drafted by the Arizona Diamondbacks	
Joe Palmisano	1925	Catcher	Major League Baseball player	
Eric Patterson	2004	Outfielder	member of the 2002 and 2003 United States National Teams, 3-time All-ACC, Major League Baseball player with the Oakland A's, formerly with the Chicago Cubs	
Jay Payton	1994	Outfielder	Tech Hall of Fame, Major League Baseball player with the Oakland Athletics	
Jason Perry	2001	Outfielder	Minor League Baseball player with the Toledo Mud Hens, the top affiliate for the Detroit Tigers	
Marc Pisciotta	1991	Pitcher	Major League Baseball player	
Jim Poole	1988	Pitcher	Tech Hall of Fame, former Major League Baseball pitcher	
Del Pratt	1907	Infielder	Major League Baseball player	
Bobby Reeves	1926	Infielder	Tech Hall of Fame, Major League Baseball player	
Brad Rigby	1994	Pitcher	Tech Hall of Fame, Major League Baseball player	
Bill Strickland	1930	Pitcher	Major League Baseball player	
Mark Teixeira	2001	Infielder	All-Star baseball player with the New York Yankees, Gold Glove winner, and Silver Slugger Award winner	
Bob Tillman	1957	Catcher	Major League Baseball player	
Cory Vance	2000	Pitcher	Major League Baseball player	
Jason Varitek	1994	Catcher	Tech Hall of Fame, All-Star baseball player and captain of the Boston Red Sox, Gold Glove winner, and Silver Slugger Award winner	
Matt Wieters	2007	Catcher	Major League Baseball player for the Baltimore Orioles	
Blake Wood	2006	Pitcher	Major League Baseball player for the Kansas City Royals	
Kyle Wren	2013	Outfielder	Major League Baseball player for the Atlanta Braves organization; his father is Frank Wren, former general manager of the Braves	
Frank Waddey	1928	Outfielder	Major League Baseball player	
Kris Wilson	1997	Pitcher	Major League Baseball starting pitcher	
Whit Wyatt	1927	Pitcher	Major League Baseball player	

== Golf ==
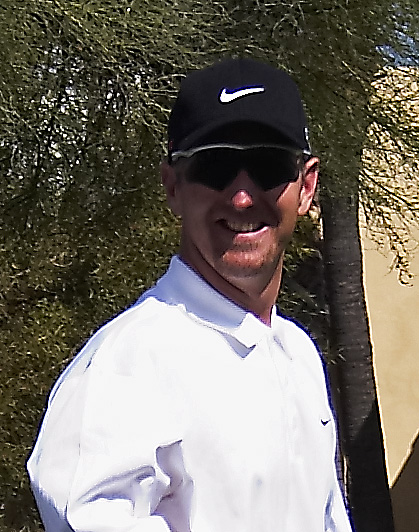
David Duval, Tech Hall of Fame, ranked #1 for 15 weeks, #3 overall 1998–2001

Name	Class year	Notability	Reference(s)
Stewart Cink	1995	Tech Hall of Fame, former Top Ten golfer in the world and winner of the 2009 British Open	
Michael Clark II	1992	professional golfer, has three wins	
David Duval	1993	Tech Hall of Fame, former #1 ranked golfer in the world and winner of the 2001 British Open; has 19 professional wins	
Bunky Henry	1966	Tech Hall of Fame, professional golfer, also played football	
Tripp Isenhour	1990	professional golfer with the PGA Tour, has six wins	
Bobby Jones	1922	Tech Hall of Fame, legendary golfer and founder of The Masters; earned a BS in Mechanical Engineering after he was famous for golf	
Matt Kuchar	2000	professional golfer, 1997 U.S. Amateur Champion, has two wins, won bronze at the 2016 Olympics	
Troy Matteson	2003	professional golfer, has three wins	
Larry Mize	1979	Tech Hall of Fame, professional golfer and winner of the 1987 Masters	
Ollie Schniederjans	2014	professional golfer, former #1 ranked amateur in the world	
Cameron Tringale	2009	professional golfer	

== Tennis ==
Name	Class year	Notability	References
Christopher Eubanks	2018	professional tennis player; 2x All-American; 2016 and 2017 ACC Player of the Year; 2017 ITA Arthur Ashe, Jr. Leadership and Sportsmanship Award	
Irina Falconi	2010	professional tennis player; 2x All-American; 2010 ACC Player of the Year; 2010 Campbell's/ITA National Player of the Year; ITA All-American Tournament Champion 2009; #1 Ranked Player in the Nation 2009–2010	
Kevin King	2012	professional tennis player; 2x All-American; 3x All-ACC	
West Nott	2005	semi-professional tennis player; former USC Women's Tennis assistant coach; University of Texas at Rio Grande Valley Women's Tennis coach	
Bryan Shelton	1989	award-winning tennis player: four-time All-ACC at Tech; 1988 All-American; former Georgia Tech Women's Tennis Coach; Tech Hall of Fame; Huntsville-Madison County Athletic Hall of Fame	
Kenny Thorne	1989	award-winning tennis player: four-time All-ACC at Tech; 1988 All-American; 1988 ITA John Van Nostrand Memorial Award; two professional doubles titles; Georgia Tech Men's Tennis Coach; Tech Hall of Fame; 1999, 2017 ACC Coach of the Year; 2011 ITA National Coach of the Year	

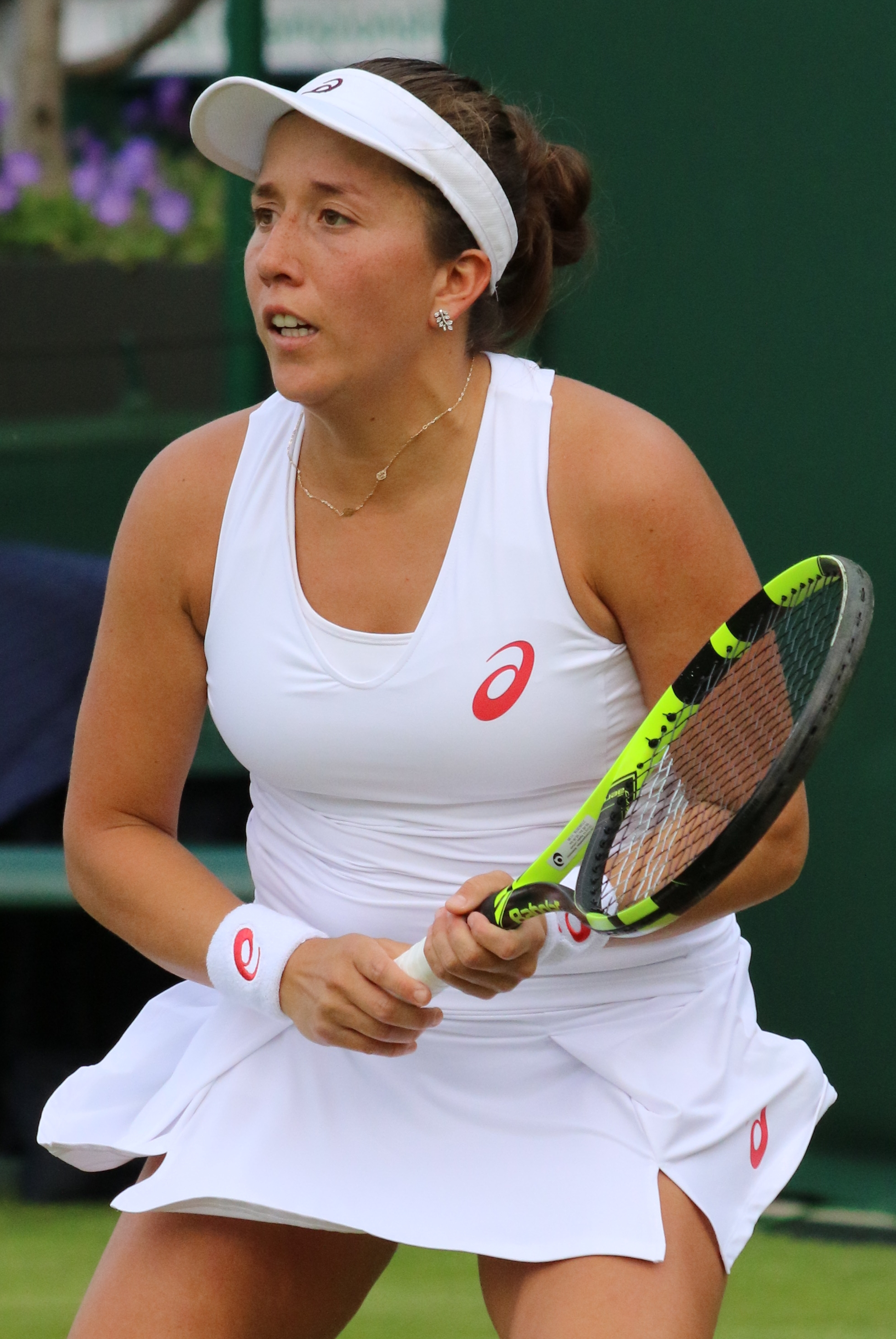
Irina Falconi, 2x All-American, ranked No. 1 college player in the nation, current professional tennis player

== Track and field ==
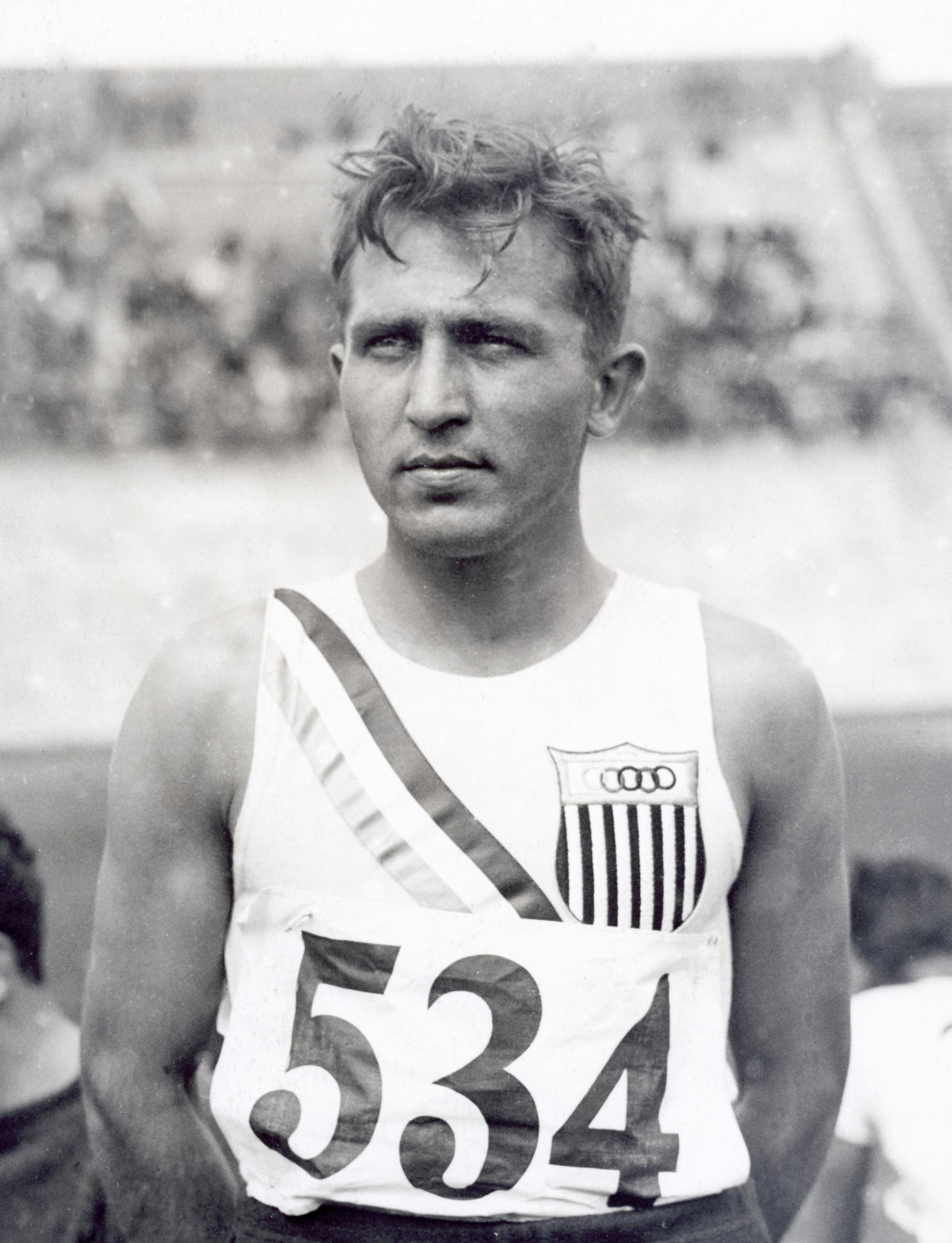
Ed Hamm, Tech Hall of Fame, 1928 Summer Olympics gold medalist

Name	Class year	Notability	Reference(s)
Derrick Adkins	1993	Tech Hall of Fame, winner of 400 m hurdles at the 1996 Summer Olympics	
Ed Hamm	1929	Tech Hall of Fame, won the gold medal in the long jump at the 1928 Summer Olympics held in Amsterdam, Netherlands	
David Krummenacker	1998	professional track athlete, three-time world champion in the 800m	
Antonio McKay	1985	Tech Hall of Fame, won gold medals at the 1984 and 1988 Olympics	
Derek Mills	1994	Tech Hall of Fame, 1996 Olympic Games gold medalist in the men's 4 × 400 meter relay for the United States	
Angelo Taylor	1998	won the NCAA title in 1998 and placed second in 1997; winner of 400 m hurdles at the 2000 Summer Olympics and 2008 Summer Olympics; suspended by SafeSport for sexual misconduct	
Longino Welch	1923	Tech Hall of Fame, won the pole vault competition at the first NCAA track and field championships in 1921 with a jump of 12 feet	

== Other athletics ==
Name	Class year	Notability	Reference(s)
Joe Anoa'i	2006	professional wrestler in WWE under the name Roman Reigns; played football at Tech	
Jordan Smith	2003	rower, currently Men's Head Coach of the rowing team at Emory University; former member of the US national rowing team, placed third at the 2005 World Rowing Championships	
Mark Zupan	1999	U.S. quadriplegic wheelchair rugby team captain, Paralympic Games athlete, Team USA official spokesperson; star of Murderball	

== See also ==
- Atlantic Coast Conference
- Buzz (mascot)
- "Ramblin' Wreck from Georgia Tech"
