= Georgia Tech Yellow Jackets baseball statistical leaders =

The Georgia Tech Yellow Jackets baseball statistical leaders are individual statistical leaders of the Georgia Tech Yellow Jackets baseball program in various categories, including batting average, home runs, runs batted in, runs, hits, stolen bases, ERA, and Strikeouts. Within those areas, the lists identify single-game, single-season, and career leaders. The Yellow Jackets represent the Georgia Institute of Technology in the NCAA's Atlantic Coast Conference.

Georgia Tech began competing in intercollegiate baseball in 1895. These lists are updated through the end of the 2025 season.

== Batting Average ==
Career (Min. 200 at-bats)
| Rk | Player | AVG | Seasons |
|---|---|---|---|
| 1 | Tom Angley | .4364 (127-291) | 1925 1926 1927 |
| 2 | Jarren Advincula | .4336 (111-256) | 2026 |
| 3 | Chandler Simpson | .4334 (88-203) | 2022 |
| 4 | Doug Wycoff | .4235 (108-255) | 1924 1925 1926 |
| 5 | Mark Teixeira | .4091 (216-528) | 1999 2000 2001 |
| 6 | Charlie Blackmon | .3960 (99-250) | 2007 2008 |
| 7 | Angelo DiSpigna | .3927 (86-219) | 2023 |
| 8 | Scott Jordan | .3858 (294-762) | 1982 1983 1984 1985 |
| 9 | Jason Varitek | .3840 (351-914) | 1991 1992 1993 1994 |
| 10 | Richard Lewis | .3765 (259-688) | 1999 2000 2001 |

Season (Min. 75 at-bats)
| Rk | Player | AVG | Season |
|---|---|---|---|
| 1 | Tom Angley | .500 (50-100) | 1925 |
| 2 | Bob Lusk | .465 (46-99) | 1951 |
| 3 | Doug Ibele | .464 (52-112) | 1979 |
| 4 | Doug Wycoff | .439 (43-98) | 1926 |
| 5 | Jay Payton | .4343 (129-297) | 1994 |
| 6 | Jarren Advincula | .4336 (111-256) | 2026 |
| 7 | Chandler Simpson | .4334 (88-203) | 2022 |
| 8 | Mark Teixeira | .4274 (103-241) | 2000 |
| 9 | Nomar Garciaparra | .4270 (117-274) | 1994 |
| 10 | Riccardo Ingram | .4262 (101-237) | 1987 |

== Home Runs ==
Career
| Rk | Player | HR | Seasons |
|---|---|---|---|
| 1 | Drew Burress | 60 | 2024 2025 2026 |
| 2 | Jason Varitek | 57 | 1991 1992 1993 1994 |
| 3 | J.J. Thomas | 56 | 1995 1996 1997 |
| 4 | Tony Plagman | 55 | 2007 2008 2009 2010 |
| 5 | Andy Bruce | 52 | 1988 1989 1990 1991 |
| 6 | Kyle McCann | 47 | 2017 2018 2019 |
| | Luke Murton | 47 | 2006 2007 2008 2009 |
| | Matt Skole | 47 | 2009 2010 2011 |
| 9 | K.G. White | 46 | 1985 1986 1987 1988 |
| 10 | Stephen Reid | 45 | 2020 2021 2022 2023 |

Season
| Rk | Player | HR | Season |
|---|---|---|---|
| 1 | Kevin Parada | 26 | 2022 |
| 2 | Anthony Maisano | 25 | 1990 |
| | Drew Burress | 25 | 2024 |
| 4 | Mark Fischer | 24 | 1997 |
| 5 | Kyle McCann | 23 | 2019 |
| | Ryan Zuckerman | 23 | 2026 |
| 7 | Andy Bruce | 22 | 1991 |
| | Jason Varitek | 22 | 1993 |
| | J.J. Thomas | 22 | 1997 |
| 10 | J.J. Thomas | 21 | 1996 |
| | Tony Plagman | 21 | 2010 |

Single Game
| Rk | Player | HR | Season | Opponent |
|---|---|---|---|---|
| 1 | Drew Burress | 4 | 2024 | Georgia State |
| 2 | 16 times | 3 | Most recent: Ryan Zuckerman, 2026 vs. Northwestern | |

== Runs Batted In ==
Career
| Rk | Player | RBI | Seasons |
|---|---|---|---|
| 1 | Jason Varitek | 251 | 1991 1992 1993 1994 |
| 2 | Andy Bruce | 232 | 1988 1989 1990 1991 |
| 3 | Jason Basil | 230 | 1998 1999 2000 2001 |
| 4 | Steven Blackwood | 221 | 2003 2004 2005 2006 |
| 5 | Mark Fischer | 220 | 1995 1996 1997 |
| 6 | Tony Plagman | 219 | 2007 2008 2009 2010 |
| 7 | Bryan Prince | 216 | 1998 1999 2000 2001 |
| 8 | Luke Murton | 201 | 2006 2007 2008 2009 |
| 9 | Matt Wieters | 198 | 2005 2006 2007 |
| 10 | Darren Bragg | 194 | 1988 1989 1990 1991 |

Season
| Rk | Player | RBI | Season |
|---|---|---|---|
| 1 | Jay Payton | 102 | 1994 |
| 2 | Riccardo Ingram | 99 | 1987 |
| 3 | Mark Fischer | 98 | 1997 |
| 4 | Andy Bruce | 96 | 1991 |
| 5 | Kevin Parada | 88 | 2022 |
| 6 | Mike Fowler | 87 | 1987 |
| 7 | Jason Varitek | 86 | 1994 |
| 8 | Jason Basil | 83 | 2000 |
| 9 | Jeff Distasio | 82 | 1986 |
| 10 | Mark Teixeira | 80 | 2000 |

Single Game
| Rk | Player | RBI | Season | Opponent |
|---|---|---|---|---|
| 1 | Pete Geist | 9 | 1984 | Ohio State |
| | Andy Bruce | 9 | 1991 | Georgia |
| | Chase Burnett | 9 | 2009 | Presbyterian |

== Runs ==
Career
| Rk | Player | R | Seasons |
|---|---|---|---|
| 1 | Jason Varitek | 261 | 1991 1992 1993 1994 |
| 2 | Scott Jordan | 253 | 1982 1983 1984 1985 |
| 3 | Steve Newbern | 242 | 1982 1983 1984 1985 |
| 4 | Darren Bragg | 232 | 1988 1989 1990 1991 |
| | Drew Burress | 232 | 2024 2025 2026 |
| 6 | K.G. White | 222 | 1985 1986 1987 1988 |
| 7 | Ty Griffin | 220 | 1986 1987 1988 |
| | Steven Blackwood | 220 | 2003 2004 2005 2006 |
| | Victor Menocal | 220 | 1999 2000 2001 2002 |
| 10 | Tony Plagman | 213 | 2007 2008 2009 2010 |

Season
| Rk | Player | R | Season |
|---|---|---|---|
| 1 | Mark Teixeira | 104 | 2000 |
| 2 | Riccardo Ingram | 93 | 1987 |
| 3 | Nomar Garciaparra | 92 | 1994 |
| 4 | Jason Varitek | 87 | 1994 |
| 5 | Darren Bragg | 86 | 1991 |
| 6 | Vahn Lackey | 85 | 2026 |
| 7 | Mike Fowler | 84 | 1987 |
| 8 | Drew Burress | 82 | 2026 |
| 9 | Ty Griffin | 81 | 1988 |
| 10 | Richard Lewis | 79 | 2000 |
| | Kevin Parada | 79 | 2022 |

Single Game
| Rk | Player | R | Season | Opponent |
|---|---|---|---|---|
| 1 | Frank Turner | 7 | 1975 | Earlham |

== Hits ==
Career
| Rk | Player | H | Seasons |
|---|---|---|---|
| 1 | Jason Varitek | 351 | 1991 1992 1993 1994 |
| 2 | Victor Menocal | 327 | 1999 2000 2001 2002 |
| 3 | Matt Gonzalez | 302 | 2013 2014 2015 2016 |
| 4 | Scott Jordan | 294 | 1982 1983 1984 1985 |
| 5 | Wade Bailey | 290 | 2015 2016 2017 2018 |
| 6 | Jason Basil | 289 | 1998 1999 2000 2001 |
| 7 | Jay Payton | 287 | 1992 1993 1994 |
| 8 | Steven Blackwood | 283 | 2003 2004 2005 2006 |
| 9 | Tony Plagman | 282 | 2007 2008 2009 2010 |
| 10 | Brandon Hensley | 281 | 1992 1993 1994 1995 |

Season
| Rk | Player | H | Season |
|---|---|---|---|
| 1 | Jay Payton | 129 | 1994 |
| 2 | Nomar Garciaparra | 117 | 1994 |
| 3 | Jarren Advincula | 111 | 2026 |
| 4 | Richard Lewis | 109 | 2000 |
| 5 | Jason Varitek | 106 | 1994 |
| | Wes Hodges | 106 | 2005 |
| 7 | Mark Fischer | 104 | 1996 |
| | Victor Menocal | 104 | 2002 |
| 9 | Mark Teixeira | 103 | 2000 |
| 10 | Victor Menocal | 102 | 2001 |

Single Game
| Rk | Player | H | Season | Opponent |
|---|---|---|---|---|
| 1 | K.G. White | 6 | 1987 | Evansville |
| | Jeremy Slayden | 6 | 2003 | Duke |
| | Chase Burnett | 6 | 2009 | Presbyterian |
| | Zane Evans | 6 | 2013 | Clemson |

== Stolen Bases ==
Career
| Rk | Player | SB | Seasons |
|---|---|---|---|
| 1 | Ty Griffin | 127 | 1986 1987 1988 |
| 2 | Eric Patterson | 124 | 2002 2003 2004 |
| 3 | Scott Jordan | 114 | 1982 1983 1984 1985 |
| 4 | K.G. White | 89 | 1985 1986 1987 1988 |
| 5 | Steve Newbern | 86 | 1982 1983 1984 1985 |
| 6 | Carlton Fleming | 68 | 1990 1991 1992 |
| 7 | Nomar Garciaparra | 66 | 1992 1993 1994 |
| | Tyler Greene | 66 | 2003 2004 2005 |
| 9 | Danny Payne | 64 | 2005 2006 2007 |
| 10 | Kyle Wren | 60 | 2011 2012 2013 |

Season
| Rk | Player | SB | Season |
|---|---|---|---|
| 1 | Ty Griffin | 50 | 1986 |
| 2 | Eric Patterson | 48 | 2004 |
| 3 | Eric Patterson | 41 | 2002 |
| 4 | Scott Jordan | 40 | 1985 |
| 5 | Ty Griffin | 39 | 1987 |
| 6 | Ty Griffin | 38 | 1988 |
| 7 | Scott Jordan | 36 | 1983 |
| 8 | Anthony Byrd | 35 | 1991 |
| 9 | Eric Patterson | 35 | 2003 |
| 10 | K.G. White | 34 | 1987 |

Single Game
| Rk | Player | SB | Season | Opponent |
|---|---|---|---|---|
| 1 | K.G. White | 5 | 1987 | ETSU |
| | Eric Patterson | 5 | 2004 | Duke |

== Earned Run Average ==
Career (Min. 100 innings)
| Rk | Player | ER/IP | ERA | Seasons |
|---|---|---|---|---|
| 1 | Mike Schisler | 54/246.2 | 1.97 | 1970 1971 1972 1973 |
| 2 | Gary Steele | 41/163.1 | 2.26 | 1968 1969 1970 |
| 3 | Bud Blemker | 60/233.2 | 2.31 | 1957 1958 1959 |
| 4 | Mike Sorrow | 66/247.1 | 2.40 | 1969 1970 1971 1972 |
| 5 | Bud Moore | 48/172.1 | 2.51 | 1966 1967 1968 |
| 6 | Brett Binkley | 55/176.0 | 2.81 | 1991 1992 1993 |
| 7 | Brandon Gold | 60/191.0 | 2.83 | 2014 2015 2016 |
| 8 | Bill Pridgen | 43/136.1 | 2.84 | 1971 1972 |
| 9 | Jeff Payne | 41/124.0 | 2.98 | 1965 1966 1967 |
| 10 | Jim Robinson | 62/186.1 | 2.99 | 1964 1965 1966 |

Season (Min. 36 innings)
| Rk | Player | ER/IP | ERA | Season |
|---|---|---|---|---|
| 1 | Matthew Gorst | 3/49.0 | 0.55 | 2016 |
| 2 | Mike Sorrow | 10/84.0 | 1.07 | 1971 |
| 3 | Sam Clay | 8/57.0 | 1.26 | 2014 |
| 4 | Mike Schisler | 13/86.1 | 1.355 | 1973 |
| 5 | Bud Blemker | 11/72.2 | 1.362 | 1957 |
| 6 | Jerry Priestley | 8/42.0 | 1.71 | 1966 |
| 7 | Mike Schisler | 7/36.2 | 1.72 | 1970 |
| 8 | Mark Pope | 22/113.2 | 1.74 | 2011 |
| 9 | Bud Moore | 16/81.1 | 1.77 | 1967 |
| 10 | Gary Steele | 12/60.2 | 1.78 | 1969 |

== Strikeouts ==
Career
| Rk | Player | K | Seasons |
|---|---|---|---|
| 1 | Doug Creek | 458 | 1988 1989 1990 1991 |
| 2 | Brad Rigby | 397 | 1992 1993 1994 |
| 3 | Buck Farmer | 387 | 2010 2011 2012 2013 |
| 4 | Chuck Crowder | 377 | 1996 1997 1998 1999 |
| 5 | Cory Vance | 328 | 1998 1999 2000 |
| 6 | Deck McGuire | 306 | 2008 2009 2010 |
| 7 | Jerry Bass | 294 | 1974 1975 1976 1977 |
| 8 | David Elder | 283 | 1995 1996 1997 |
| 9 | Marc Pisciotta | 275 | 1989 1990 1991 |
| 10 | Kyle Bakker | 274 | 2001 2002 2003 |

Season
| Rk | Player | K | Season |
|---|---|---|---|
| 1 | Brad Rigby | 184 | 1994 |
| 2 | Ed LaFitte | 145 | 1906 |
| 3 | Chuck Crowder | 133 | 1998 |
| 4 | Brad Rigby | 132 | 1993 |
| 5 | Chuck Crowder | 130 | 1999 |
| 6 | Doug Creek | 128 | 1991 |
| 7 | Doug Creek | 126 | 1990 |
| 8 | Marc Pisciotta | 124 | 1991 |
| | Al Gogolin | 124 | 1994 |
| 10 | David Elder | 123 | 1996 |
| | Cory Vance | 123 | 2000 |

Single Game
| Rk | Player | K | Season | Opponent |
|---|---|---|---|---|
| 1 | Doc Wilson | 20 | 1910 | Vanderbilt |
