= James Brewster =

James Brewster or variants thereof may refer to:

- James Brewster (1777–1847), British minister, brother of David Brewster
- James C. Brewster (1826–1909), co-founder of the Church of Christ (Brewsterite)
- Jim Brewster (born c. 1947), Democratic member of the Pennsylvania Senate since 2010
- Jimmy Brewster (1902–1998), American football player
- Jimmy Brewster, an alias of Milt Gabler (1911–2001), American record producer
- Wally Brewster (James Walter Brewster Jr., born 1960), U.S. diplomat and ambassador to the Dominican Republic, 2013–2017
