= 1988 ACC tournament =

1988 ACC tournament may refer to:

- 1988 ACC men's basketball tournament
- 1988 ACC women's basketball tournament
- 1988 ACC men's soccer tournament
- 1988 ACC women's soccer tournament
- 1988 Atlantic Coast Conference baseball tournament
