= Everglades Hotel =

Former hotel in Florida, USA

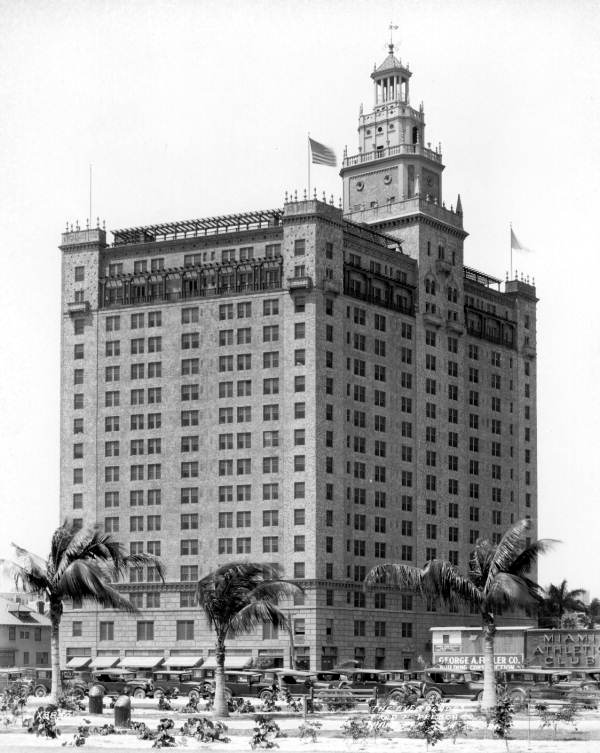
- Interactive map of the Everglades Hotel area

General information
- Status: Demolished
- Type: Hotel
- Location: 244 Biscayne Blvd, Miami, Florida, United States
- Opening: September 1926
- Closed: 2003; 23 years ago
- Demolished: January 23, 2005; 21 years ago

Technical details
- Floor count: 23

Other information
- Number of rooms: 376
- Number of restaurants: 3

Everglades Hotel was a historic 16-floor 1926 hotel tipped by a Giralda tower in Downtown Miami, Florida. It was once the largest hotel in the city. The building was demolished on January 23, 2005, to make room for new construction. The new hotel was originally named Everglades on the Bay; it was later renamed Vizcayne. The hotel was designed and built by New York City based real estate developer Fred F. French's company.

== History ==
Construction of the hotel was completed just before the Great Miami Hurricane of 1926, which flooded the lobby.

Television station WTVJ (channel 4, now 6) originally had its transmitter atop the hotel when it signed on the air in 1949.

In September 1957, Miami real estate developer Vaughan Connelly bought the hotel for $2 million ($22.9 million in 2025). He subsequently took out a mortgage on the property from the Teamsters Union, who foreclosed on the mortgage and acquired the property in 1960. By April 1963, Connelly was bankrupt. In May 1964, Connelly testified in court that he was required to pay 10% of the amount he borrowed from the Teamsters, then led by Jimmy Hoffa, as under-the-table commissions. Hoffa was convicted of fraud for his involvement with loans and kickbacks, including for the Everglades Hotel.

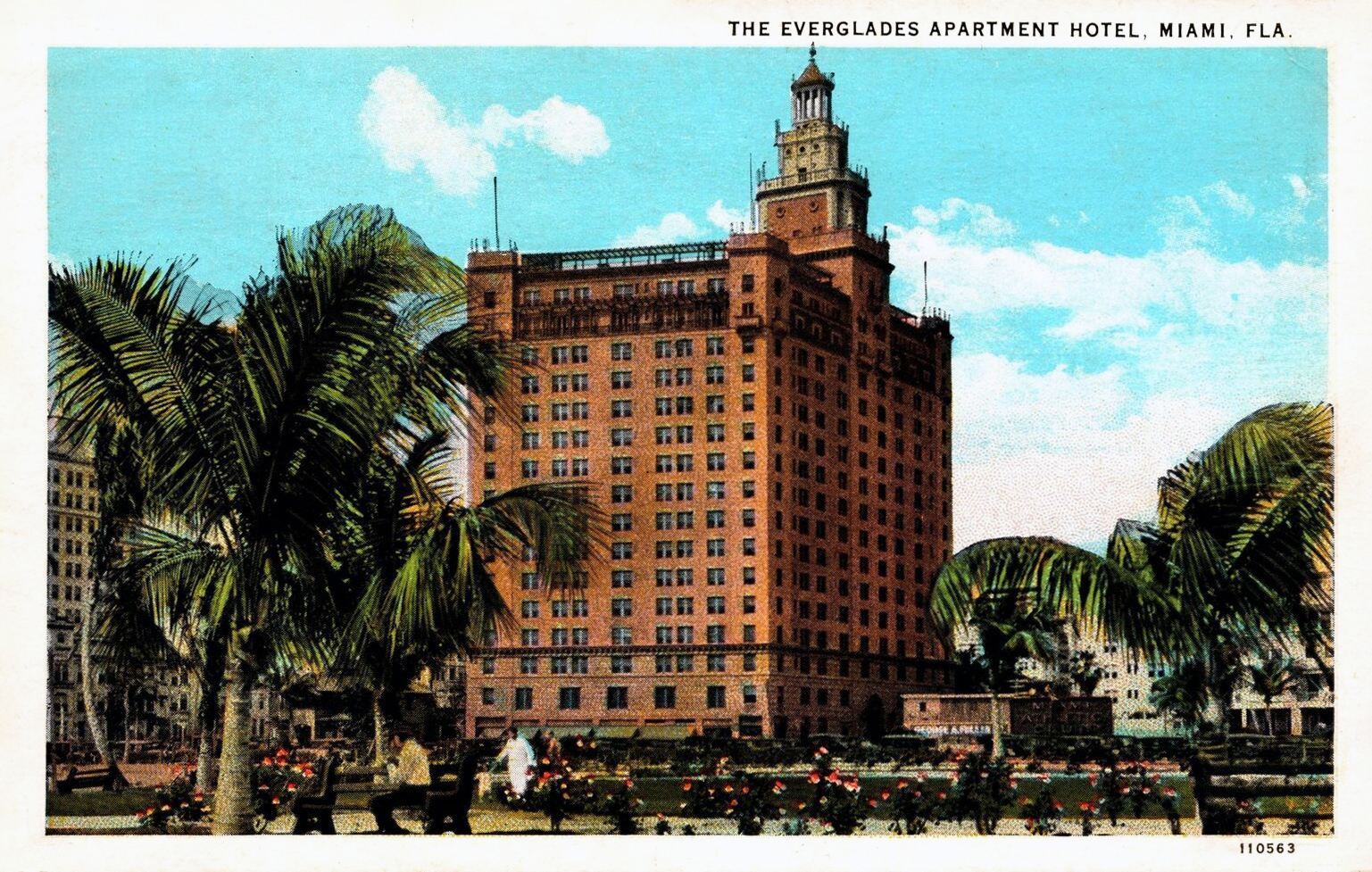
1926 postcard

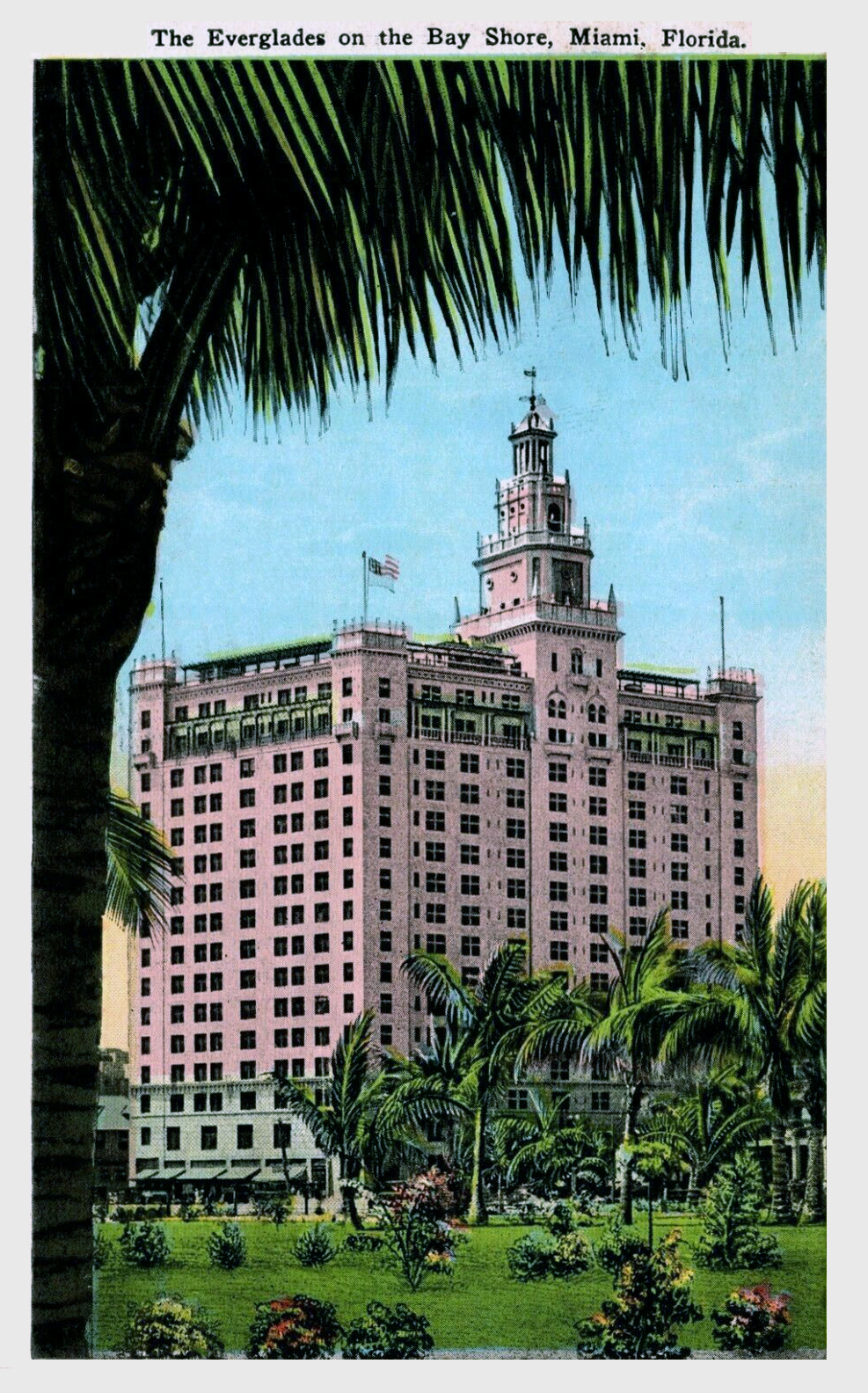
1927 postcard

The building was demolished on January 23, 2005, to make room for new construction. The new hotel was originally named Everglades on the Bay; it was later renamed Vizcayne.

== See also ==
- George A. Fuller
