= East Marietta National Little League =

East Marietta National Little League

Chartered in 1959, the East Marietta National Little League of Marietta, Georgia, won the 1983 Little League World Series. East Marietta defeated Liquito Hernandez Little League of Barahona, Dominican Republic, in the championship game of the 37th Little League World Series, led by pitcher Marc Pisciotta, who would later play professionally in Major League Baseball.

The 1983 championship team was coached by Richard Hilton, and went 14–0 in its run to the title, capturing district, state and region titles en route to the World Series crown.

East Marietta National Little League plays out of Sewell Park, in Marietta, Georgia. The Little League park at Sewell was completed in 1959, and the first games were played on May 9. At that time East Marietta was still part of Marietta Little League, which had three leagues with six teams each—Western and American playing out of Larry Bell field, and National playing out of the new Sewell Park.
