= 1926 NCAA baseball season =

American college baseball season

Seasons
- ← 1925 1927 →

The 1926 NCAA baseball season, play of college baseball in the United States organized by the National Collegiate Athletic Association (NCAA) began in the spring of 1926. Play largely consisted of regional matchups, some organized by conferences, and ended in June. No national championship event was held until 1947.

== Conference winners ==
This is a partial list of conference champions from the 1926 season.

Conference	Regular season winner
Big Ten Conference	Michigan
Missouri Valley	Oklahoma
Pacific Coast Conference	North - Washington; South - California
Southern Conference	Georgia Tech
Southwest Conference	Texas
