= 1926 Georgia Tech Golden Tornado baseball team =

American college baseball season

1926 Georgia Tech Yellow Jackets baseball

SoCon Champion
- Conference: Southern Conference
- Record: 21–4–1 (15–4–1 SoCon)
- Head coach: Kid Clay
- Home stadium: Grant Field

The 1926 Georgia Tech Golden Tornado baseball team represented the Georgia Tech Golden Tornado of the Georgia Institute of Technology in the 1926 NCAA baseball season, winning the Southern Conference.
