= Ike Williams (American football) =

American football player (1903–1977)

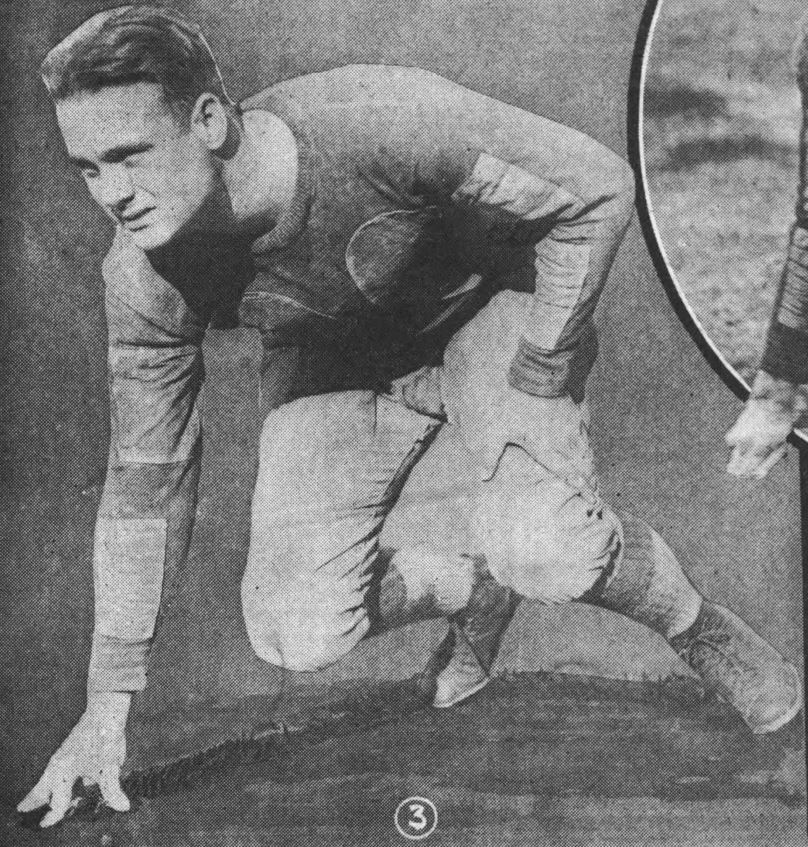
- Williams in 1925

No. 5
- Positions: Halfback, Quarterback, Kicker

Personal information
- Born: April 23, 1902; Marshall, Oklahoma, U.S.
- Died: April 18, 1988 (aged 85); Kettering, Ohio, U.S.
- Listed height: 5 ft 10 in (1.78 m)
- Listed weight: 180 lb (82 kg)

Career information
- High school: Little Rock Central (AR)
- College: Georgia Tech (1923–1925)

Career history
- Newark Bears (1926); Staten Island Stapletons (1929)

Career AFL / NFL statistics
- Games played: 10
- Games started: 9
- Stats at Pro Football Reference

Ivan Andy "Ike" Williams (April 23, 1902 – April 18, 1988) was an American gridiron football player of the 1920s. He played college football for Georgia Tech and later had a brief professional career.

== Biography ==
Williams was born in 1902 in Marshall, Oklahoma, and attended Little Rock Central High School in Arkansas. He played high school football with his brother, Orval, (Note: Orval Williams died in 1981.) and Doug Wycoff—all three entered the Georgia School of Technology (Georgia Tech). Williams played for the Georgia Tech football team during the one-platoon system era, and was a three-time letterman (1923–1925). (Note: He appears in the list of all-time George Tech letterwinners as I. A. Williams.) Williams was primarily a halfback during his sophomore and junior seasons; he was named to the 1923 College Football All-Southern Team by John Francis of the Courier Journal of Louisville, Kentucky. Williams played quarterback as a senior; he was also a placekicker. In the 1925 Georgia–Georgia Tech football rivalry game, a third-quarter field goal by Williams was the only scoring in the game, giving Georgia Tech a 3–0 victory.

At Georgia Tech, Williams was a member of the Sigma Alpha Epsilon fraternity and the Delta Sigma Pi honorary fraternity; he was selected vice-president of his sophomore class, president of his junior class, and vice-president of his senior class; he also was a member of the school's glee club.

Williams played professional football with the 1926 Newark Bears in the first American Football League (AFL), with several other former Georgia Tech players including Jimmy Brewster, Vaughan Connelly, and Wycoff. He later played for the 1929 Staten Island Stapletons of the National Football League (NFL). In his season with the Stapleton, he suffered a season-ending injury against the New York Giants.

At the time he registered for the draft, in February 1942, Williams was living in Wayne, Michigan, and was working for Ford Motor Company. In August 1942, he married Charlotte Bell Swingle of Urbana, Ohio. Williams went on to own and operate a seed company in Urbana, and served as president of the Ohio Seed Association. Williams died in 1988 at his residence in Kettering, Ohio; he was survived by his wife and two daughters.

== See also ==
- List of Georgia Tech Yellow Jackets starting quarterbacks
