= Vaughan Connelly =

American football player (1902–1991)

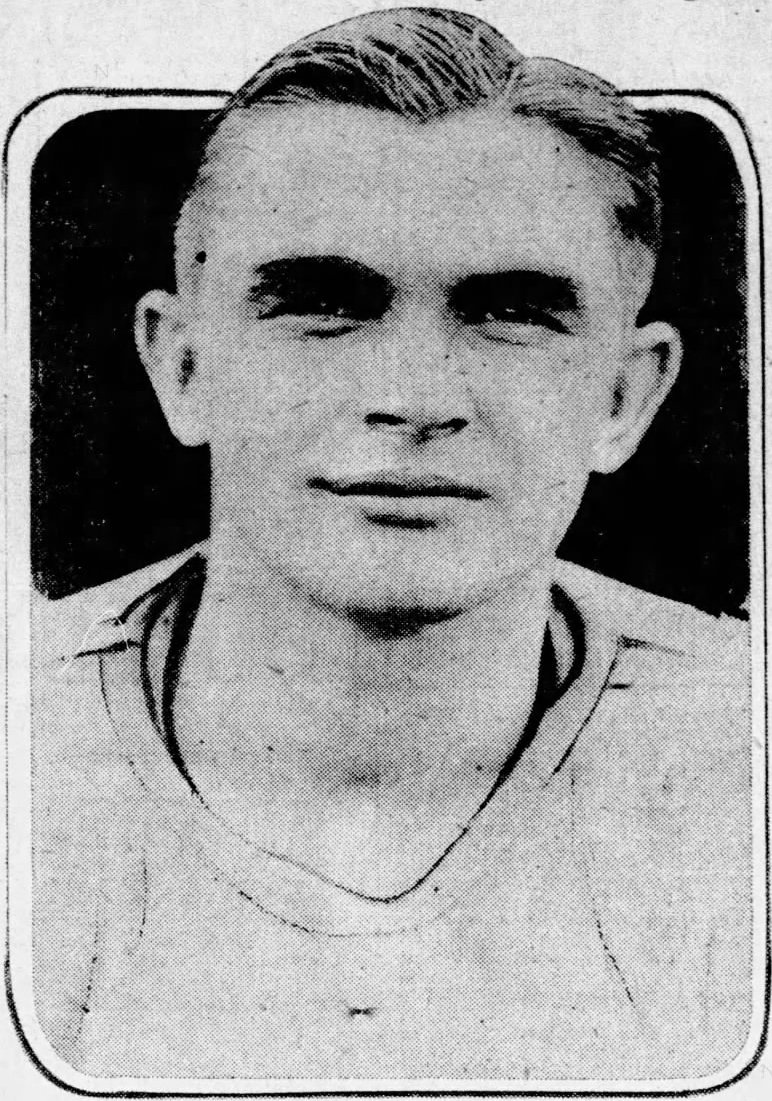
- Connelly in 1925

Profile
- Position: Halfback

Personal information
- Born: August 25, 1902; Atlanta, Georgia, U.S.
- Died: April 18, 1991 (aged 88)
- Listed height: 5 ft 8 in (1.73 m)
- Listed weight: 170 lb (77 kg)

Career information
- College: Georgia Tech (1924–1925)

Career history
- 1926: Newark Bears

Vaughan Bradford Connelly (Note: Variant spellings of his given name and surname are seen in some sources. This article presents his name as listed on his World War II draft registration card. He appears in Georgia Tech's list of all-time lettermen as "Vaughn Connally".) (August 25, 1902 – April 18, 1991) was an American gridiron football player who played college football for Georgia Tech and later played in the first American Football League (AFL) in 1926. He subsequently was active in real estate development and other ventures, described by The Miami News in 1957 as "widely known for his real estate, gas, oil, mining, hotel and apartment operations."

== Biography ==
Connelly was born in Atlanta in 1902. His father was the superintendent of police for the Southern Railway. Connelly attended Central High School in Washington, D.C., where he was a letterman in football and track. He also attended Staunton Military Academy in Virginia, lettering there in basketball, football, and track.

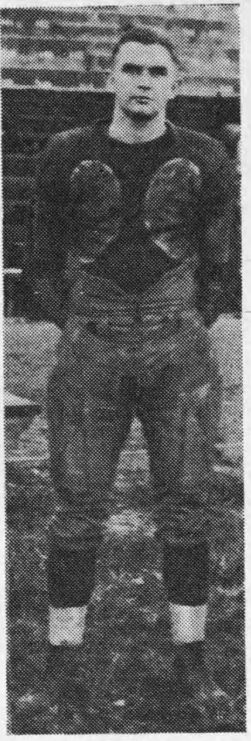
Connelly in 1925

Connelly attended the Georgia School of Technology (Georgia Tech) where he played college football for the Georgia Tech football team as a halfback during the one-platoon system era. He was nicknamed "One Minute", in reference to his entering a game against Oglethorpe University in the final minute of play and scoring a touchdown. He also competed in track in the broad jump and high hurdles. A member of the class of 1927, he joined Sigma Alpha Epsilon as a freshman. He left college after his junior season, as alluded to in the school's 1926 yearbook, evidently to work in real estate in Miami.

Connelly played professional football with the 1926 Newark Bears in the first American Football League (AFL), with several other former Georgia Tech players including Jimmy Brewster, Ike Williams, and Doug Wycoff. He was listed at 5 feet 8 inches (1.73 m) and 170 pounds (77 kg) with Newark.

From March 1929 to March 1930, Connelly was the advertising and business manager of the National Aeronautic Association, based in Washington, D.C. In early 1945, Connelly and his wife purchased a "home of distinction" on Collins Avenue in Miami Beach, Florida. Connelly was evidently an angler, having caught a 23-pound (10 kg) barracuda during a fishing tournament in March 1947.

As of 1956, Connelly was active in real estate development in Fort Lauderdale, Florida, and Washington, D.C. In September 1957, he bought the Everglades Hotel in Miami for $2 million ($22.9 million in 2025). He subsequently took out a mortgage on the property from the Teamsters Union, who foreclosed on the mortgage and acquired the property in 1960. By April 1963, Connelly was bankrupt. In May 1964, Connelly testified in court that he was required to pay 10% of the amount he borrowed from the Teamsters, then led by Jimmy Hoffa, as under-the-table commissions. Hoffa was convicted of fraud for his involvement with loans and kickbacks, including for the Everglades Hotel.

Connelly was married to M. Louise Connelly. She was also active in real estate; in 1959, the company she led purchased the historic Langford Building in Miami from the estate of Louis B. Mayer. As of mid-1967, the couple was living in Alexandria, Virginia.
