= Drew Burress =

American baseball player (born 2004)

Athletics
- Outfielder
- Born: December 5, 2004 (age 21); Warner Robins, Georgia, U.S.
- Bats: Right Throws: Right
- Stats at Baseball Reference

Andrew Wade Burress (born December 5, 2004) is an American baseball outfielder in the Athletics organization. He played college baseball for the Georgia Tech Yellow Jackets.

== Amateur career ==
Burress grew up in Houston County, Georgia and attended Houston County High School. As a junior, he tied the state record for RBIs with 73. Burress hit .430 with 17 doubles, three triples, 13 home runs, 55 RBIs, and 17 stolen bases as a senior. He committed to play college baseball at Georgia Tech.

Burress entered his freshman season at Georgia Tech as the Yellow Jackets starting center fielder. He slashed .381/.512/.821 with 25 home runs and was voted the Atlantic Coast Conference (ACC) Freshman of the Year and first-team All-ACC. Burress also was voted a consensus first-team All-American at the end of the season. In 2024, he played collegiate summer baseball with the Yarmouth–Dennis Red Sox of the Cape Cod Baseball League. He also played for the USA Baseball Collegiate National Team in 2024 and 2025.

In 2025, Burress hit .333/.469/.693 with 19 home runs for the Yellow Jackets in his sophomore season. He was voted first-team All-ACC.

Burress entered his junior season as the starting center fielder for the Yellow Jackets in 2026. He was voted a semifinalist for both the Golden Spikes Award and Dick Howser Trophy in 2024, 2025, and 2026.

== Professional career ==
Burress was considered one of the top prospects for the 2026 Major League Baseball draft. He was drafted with the 8th pick by the Athletics in the draft. On July 20, 2026, he signed with the Athletics for an over-slot signing bonus of $7.5 million, the highest pick to sign an over-slot deal in the draft.

== Personal life ==
His father, Andy, was selected by the Cincinnati Reds in the sixth round of the 1995 Major League Baseball draft and played seven years in the minor leagues.
