= 1988 Atlantic Coast Conference baseball tournament =

American college baseball tournament

- Teams: 8
- Format: Eight-team double elimination
- Finals site: Greenville Municipal Stadium; Greenville, South Carolina
- Champions: Georgia Tech (4th title)
- Winning coach: Jim Morris (4th title)
- MVP: Ty Griffin (Georgia Tech)
- Attendance: 39,218

1988 Atlantic Coast Conference baseball standings
	Conf.				Overall
Team	W		L	PCT	W		L	PCT
No. 21 Clemson ‍†‍‍^{y}	18	–	2	.900	54	–	14	.794
No. 27 NC State ‍‍‍^{y}	13	–	6	.684	45	–	16	.738
No. 29 Georgia Tech ‍‍‡‍^{y}	12	–	8	.600	45	–	24	.652
Virginia ‍‍‍	11	–	10	.524	32	–	19	.627
North Carolina ‍‍‍	10	–	11	.476	34	–	27	.557
Wake Forest ‍‍‍	7	–	12	.368	32	–	26	.552
Maryland ‍‍‍	5	–	14	.263	20	–	24	.455
Duke ‍‍‍	3	–	16	.158	10	–	35	.222
† – Conference champion ‡ – Tournament champion y – Invited to the NCAA tournament As of June 30, 1988; Rankings from Collegiate Baseball

The 1988 Atlantic Coast Conference baseball tournament was the 1988 postseason baseball championship of the NCAA Division I Atlantic Coast Conference, held at Greenville Municipal Stadium in Greenville, South Carolina, from May 11 through 15. Georgia Tech defeated North Carolina in the championship game, earning the conference's automatic bid to the 1988 NCAA Division I baseball tournament.

== Format ==
All eight ACC teams qualified for the eight-team double-elimination tournament.

=== Seeding Procedure ===
From TheACC.com:

On Saturday (The Semifinals) of the ACC baseball tournament, the match-up between the four remaining teams is determined by previous opponents. If teams have played previously in the tournament, every attempt will be made to avoid a repeat match-up between teams, regardless of seed. If it is impossible to avoid a match-up that already occurred, then the determination is based on avoiding the most recent, current tournament match-up, regardless of seed. If no match-ups have occurred, the team left in the winners bracket will play the lowest seeded team from the losers bracket.

== Regular season results ==
Team	W	L	PCT	GB	Seed
Clemson	18	2	.900	–	1
NC State	13	6	.684	4.5	2
Georgia Tech	12	8	.600	6	3
Virginia	11	10	.524	7.5	4
North Carolina	10	11	.476	8.5	5
Wake Forest	7	12	.368	10.5	6
Maryland	5	14	.263	12.5	7
Duke	3	16	.158	14.5	8

== Tournament ==
Upper round 1
8	Duke	1
1	Clemson	9
5	North Carolina	13
4	Virginia	1
6	Wake Forest	3
3	Georgia Tech	4
7	Maryland	1
2	NC State	3

Upper round 2
1	Clemson	0
5	North Carolina	1
3	Georgia Tech	8
2	NC State	5
Lower round 1
4	Virginia	7
8	Duke	1
7	Maryland	6
6	Wake Forest	2

Upper final
3	Georgia Tech	3
5	North Carolina	5
Lower round 2
2	NC State	1
4	Virginia	6
1	Clemson	9
7	Maryland	0

Semifinals
5	North Carolina	4
1	Clemson	5
4	Virginia	4
3	Georgia Tech	5

Preliminary final
1	Clemson	6
5	North Carolina	7

Final
5	North Carolina	2
3	Georgia Tech	6

== All-tournament team ==
Position	Player	School
C	Jesse Levis	North Carolina
1B	Billy Parham	Georgia Tech
2B	Ty Griffin	Georgia Tech
3B	Darin Campbell	North Carolina
SS	Ron Maurer	North Carolina
OF	Tom Nevin	North Carolina
OF	Pat McGuire	Georgia Tech
OF	Chris DeFranco	North Carolina
DH	Brian Kowitz	Clemson
SP	Scott Erwin	Georgia Tech
RP	Jim Poole	Georgia Tech
MVP	Ty Griffin	Georgia Tech

== See also ==
- College World Series
- NCAA Division I Baseball Championship
- Atlantic Coast Conference baseball tournament
