= Kevin Parada =

American baseball player (born 2001)

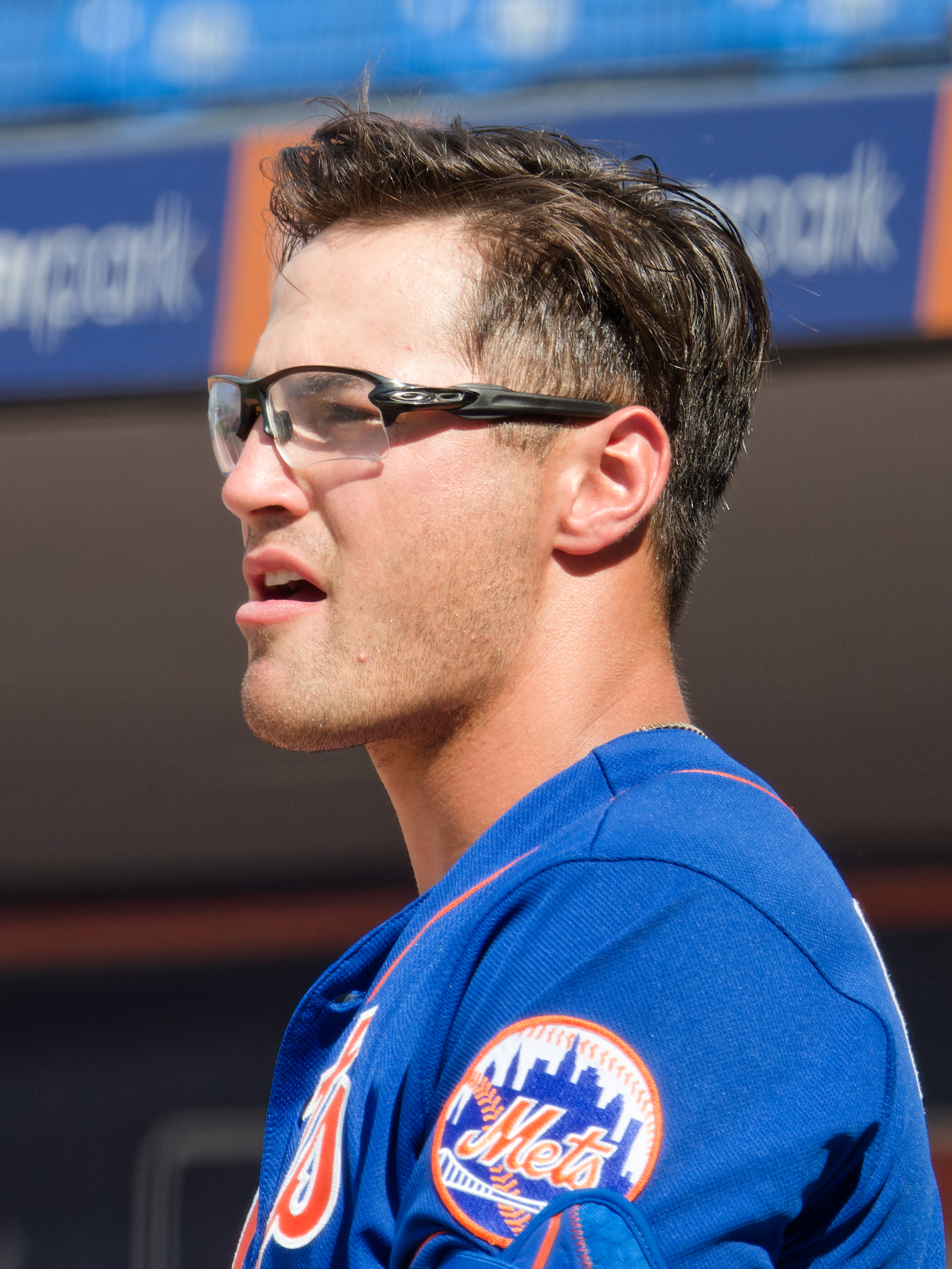
- Parada with the Mets in 2023

New York Mets
- Catcher
- Born: August 3, 2001 (age 25); Pasadena, California, U.S.
- Bats: Right Throws: Right

Kevin John Parada (born August 3, 2001) is an American professional baseball catcher in the New York Mets organization.

== Amateur career ==
Parada attended Loyola High School in Los Angeles, California. He finished his high school career with a .390 batting average, nine home runs, 66 RBI, and 24 doubles. He was considered a top prospect for the 2020 Major League Baseball draft, but went unselected, and enrolled at Georgia Tech to play college baseball.

Parada was instantly put into the starting lineup at catcher as a freshman in 2021. Over 52 games, he slashed .318/.370/.550 with nine home runs and 42 RBI alongside twenty doubles which led the Atlantic Coast Conference, earning Freshman All-American honors. Parada played nine games in the Cape Cod Baseball League with the Chatham Anglers over the summer of 2021. He was also named to the USA Baseball Collegiate National Team with whom he spent part of the summer. Parada entered the 2022 season as a top prospect for the upcoming draft. On March 1, 2022, he was named the National Player of the Week by Collegiate Baseball Newspaper after a week in which he went 12-21 with five home runs and 17 RBIs. On March 29, in a 17-3 win versus the Charleston Southern Buccaneers, Parada had his first ever two-home run game. After he hit his 26th home run of the season, he set the Georgia Tech single season home run record, breaking the previous record set by Anthony Maisano in 1990. Parada ended the season having played in sixty games, compiling a .361/.453/.709 slash line with 26 home runs and 88 RBI. Following the season's end, he traveled to San Diego where he participated in the Draft Combine. He was awarded the Buster Posey Award.

== Professional career ==
The New York Mets selected Parada in the first round with the 11th overall selection of the 2022 Major League Baseball draft. He signed with the team for $5 million.

Parada made his professional debut with the Rookie-level Florida Complex League Mets and was promoted to the St. Lucie Mets of the Single-A Florida State League after three games. Over 13 games between the two teams, he hit .275 with one home run and eight RBI. Parada was assigned to the Brooklyn Cyclones of the High-A South Atlantic League to open the 2023 season. He also briefly played for St. Lucie, and was promoted to the Binghamton Rumble Ponies of the Double-A Eastern League in late August. Over 105 games, he slashed .248/.324/.428 with 14 home runs and 54 RBI. After the season, he was selected to play in the Arizona Fall League with the Glendale Desert Dogs. Parada was assigned to Binghamton to open the 2024 season. Over 114 games, he batted .214 with 13 home runs and 43 RBI.

Parada returned to Binghamton to open the 2025 season. In August, he was promoted to the Syracuse Mets of the Triple-A International League. Over 108 games between both teams, Parada hit .245 with 11 home runs, 57 RBI, and 25 doubles. He returned to Binghamton to begin the 2026 season and also played with Syracuse. Across 94 games, Parada batted .251 with six home runs and 38 RBI.

== Personal life ==
Parada's mother, Darlene, played college softball at Woodbury University.
