= Al Loeb =

American football player (1890–1987)

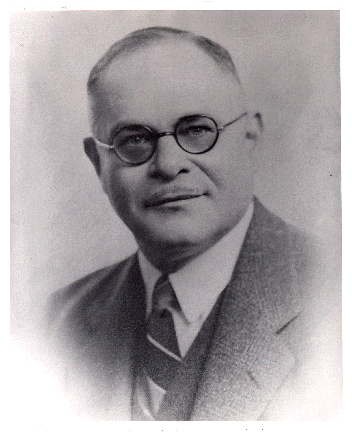

Profile
- Position: Center

Personal information
- Born: March 11, 1890; Atlanta, Georgia, U.S.
- Died: October 13, 1987 (aged 97)
- Listed height: 5 ft 7 in (1.70 m)
- Listed weight: 156 lb (71 kg)

Career information
- College: Georgia Tech (1910–1913)

Awards and highlights
- All-Southern (1913); Georgia Tech Athletic Hall of Fame

Albert Lorch Loeb (March 11, 1890 – October 13, 1987) was a standout college football player for the Georgia Tech Yellow Jackets football team, where he was nicknamed "The Yiddish Wildcat".

== Georgia Tech ==
Loeb was a prominent center for John Heisman's Georgia Tech Yellow Jackets football teams. Teammates of Loeb's at Tech would include H. W. Patterson and later Hall of Fame coach William Alexander. Loeb is a member of the Georgia Tech Athletics Hall of Fame, inducted in 1959.

=== 1912 ===
One source claims Loeb "is best remembered for the 1912 Tech-Alabama game." The Tide were favored and outweighed the Tech team. Prominent Alabama players included Hargrove and Adrian Van de Graaff. Loeb gave a rousing pep talk before the game. Heisman said "I think Loeb's speech did it. I've never seen madder playing than Al Loeb did that day and inspired by him, we won." Loeb broke three fingers during the game, but had the doctor tape them up and returned to the fray to lead Tech to a 20–3 victory. Loeb recalled "They were supposed to write their own score. We licked 'em 20-3. 'Tis said I didn't miss a tackle all day. And there were plenty of 'em made... Also, coach John Heisman had a heavy shift that left me on the end so I was eligible as a pass receiver. I caught a couple, too...I was also called upon to do a bit of blocking. We ran series plays, three or four consecutively. We had no huddle -- just lined up, and without a signal we were gone. It seemed just a bit speedier than at present."

=== 1913 ===
Loeb was selected All-Southern in 1913. He was also alternate-captain.
