= Marc Pisciotta =

American baseball player (born 1970)

- Pitcher
- Born: August 7, 1970 (age 56); Edison, New Jersey, U.S.
- Batted: Right Threw: Right

MLB debut
- June 30, 1997, for the Chicago Cubs

Last MLB appearance
- July 7, 1999, for the Kansas City Royals

MLB statistics
- Win–loss record: 4–5
- Earned run average: 4.24
- Strikeouts: 55
- Stats at Baseball Reference

Teams
- Chicago Cubs (1997–1998); Kansas City Royals (1999)

Marc George Pisciotta (born August 7, 1970), is an American former professional baseball pitcher, who played in Major League Baseball (MLB) from 1997 to 1999, for the Chicago Cubs and Kansas City Royals.

== Amateur career ==
As a Little League Baseball player, the 12-year-old, 6 ft 2 in (1.88 m) Pisciotta used his overpowering fastball to lead the East Marietta National Little League of Marietta, Georgia, to the 1983 Little League World Series title.

Pisciotta attended George Walton Comprehensive High School and played college baseball at Georgia Tech. In 1990, he played collegiate summer baseball in the Cape Cod Baseball League for the Yarmouth-Dennis Red Sox and was named a league all-star. He was selected by the Pittsburgh Pirates in the 19th round of the 1991 MLB draft.

== Professional career ==
Pisciotta was claimed off waivers by the Cubs after the 1996 season, and made his major league debut with Chicago on June 30, 1997. He appeared in 24 games for the Cubs that season, and in 43 games the following season. He was released by the Cubs prior to the 1999 season, and was picked up by the Royals, appearing in eight games for Kansas City in 1999, his final major league campaign.
