= Doug Wycoff =

American football player and coach (1903–1981)

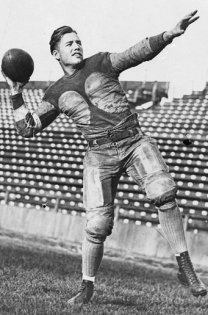
- Wycoff c. 1925

Profile
- Position: Running back

Personal information
- Born: September 16, 1903; St. Louis, Missouri, U.S.
- Died: October 27, 1981 (aged 78); Atlanta, Georgia, U.S.
- Listed height: 6 ft 2 in (1.88 m)
- Listed weight: 195 lb (88 kg)

Career information
- High school: Little Rock Central (AR)
- College: Georgia Tech

Career history

Playing
- Newark Bears (1926); New York Giants (1927); Staten Island Stapletons (1929–1930); New York Giants (1931); Staten Island Stapletons (1932); Boston Redskins (1934); Boston Shamrocks (1936)

Coaching
- Staten Island Stapletons (1929–1930)

Awards and highlights
- All-American (1924); 3× All-Southern (1923, 1924, 1925); Tech All-Era Team (William Alexander Era); Georgia Tech Athletics Hall of Fame; Georgia Sports Hall of Fame

Career statistics
- Rushing yards: 780
- Average: 3.2
- Total TDs: 13
- Stats at Pro Football Reference
- Coaching profile at Pro Football Reference

Stephen Douglas Wycoff (September 16, 1903 – October 27, 1981) was an American football running back for the New York Giants, Staten Island Stapletons, and Boston Redskins in the National Football League (NFL), the Newark Bears in the first American Football League (AFL), and the Boston Shamrocks in the second American Football League (AFL). He played college football at Georgia Tech, where he was a running back and senior captain.

== Georgia Tech ==
Wycoff prepped in Little Rock, Arkansas, and came to Tech as a package deal with Ike Williams. He was the school's first letterman in four sports.

=== Football ===
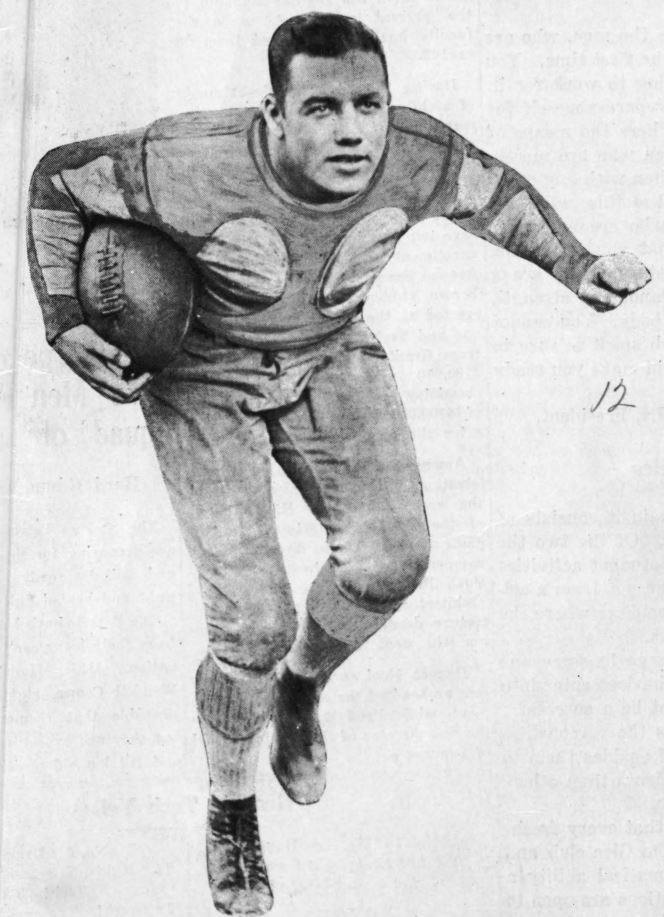
Wycoff in 1925

Wycoff was a prominent fullback for Bill Alexander's Georgia Tech Yellow Jackets football team from 1923 to 1925. He was elected captain of the 1925 team, having been "the outstanding back of the South for the past two years." Coach Alexander recalled "The work of Douglas Wycoff against Notre Dame two years in succession was brilliant in the extreme, as was his plunging against Penn. State when we defeated them twice." He was a consensus All-Southern choice each year he played. Lawrence Perry selected Wycoff first-team All-American in 1924.

Morgan Blake, sports writer for the Atlanta Journal, said of an all-time All-Southern list: "It seems to us that one name is left out in this collection, who may have been the best all-around player the South has had.

"We have reference to Doug Wycoff of Tech who, for three straight years, was practically the unanimous all-Southern football choice, despite the fact that Georgia Tech had very lean years during his period of play at this institution. If Wycoff had been flanked by such a pair of halfbacks as Red Barron and Buck Flowers, or Thomason and Mizell while he was with the Jackets, he would have been an all-American. As it was he had to carry all of the offensive load and on the defense he was a wheelhorse. He was a great punter and passer. If Wycoff was not the best all-around player the South had produced then he was very close to the peak."

== Professional football ==
=== Newark Bears ===
Wycoff played professional football with the 1926 Newark Bears in the first American Football League (AFL), with several other former Georgia Tech players including Jimmy Brewster, Vaughan Connelly, and Ike Williams. Wycoff scored the Bears only points in their short existence, having a touchdown run and kicking the extra point to tie the Chicago Bulls in both teams’ opening game of the season.

=== Miami Seahawks ===
He was one time part owner of the Miami Seahawks.

== Professional wrestling ==
Wycoff also wrestled. He once beat former Florida Gators fullback Bill Middlekauff in a match, the main event at the Atlanta Municipal Auditorium for Georgia Championship Wrestling promoter Henry Weber.

== Championships and accomplishments ==
- Championship Wrestling from Florida
  - NWA Florida Heavyweight Championship (1 time)
