= Scott Jordan (baseball) =

American baseball player (born 1963)

- Outfielder
- Born: May 27, 1963 (age 63); Waco, Texas, U.S.
- Batted: Right Threw: Right

MLB debut
- September 2, 1988, for the Cleveland Indians

Last MLB appearance
- October 2, 1988, for the Cleveland Indians

MLB statistics
- Games played: 7
- Batting average: .111
- Stats at Baseball Reference

Teams
- Cleveland Indians (1988)

Scott Allan Jordan (last name pronounced Jur-dan, born May 22, 1963) is an American former Major League Baseball outfielder who played with the Cleveland Indians in 1988.

== Biography ==
In college, Jordan was a standout player for the Georgia Tech Yellow Jackets, and still holds the team record for consecutive games on base streak, at 79. In 1984, he played collegiate summer baseball with the Hyannis Mets of the Cape Cod Baseball League and was named a league all-star.

He debuted as a late season call up for the Cleveland Indians in September 1988. He had one hit (against Jerry Reuss) and one RBI in his MLB career. After retiring from playing, he became a fixture on the Atlanta baseball card show circuit as a dealer. He had one baseball card, the 1989 Donruss set #609, and he was listed in Beckett Baseball Card Monthly magazine for months, even after he retired.
