= Jimmy Brewster =

American football player (1902–1998)

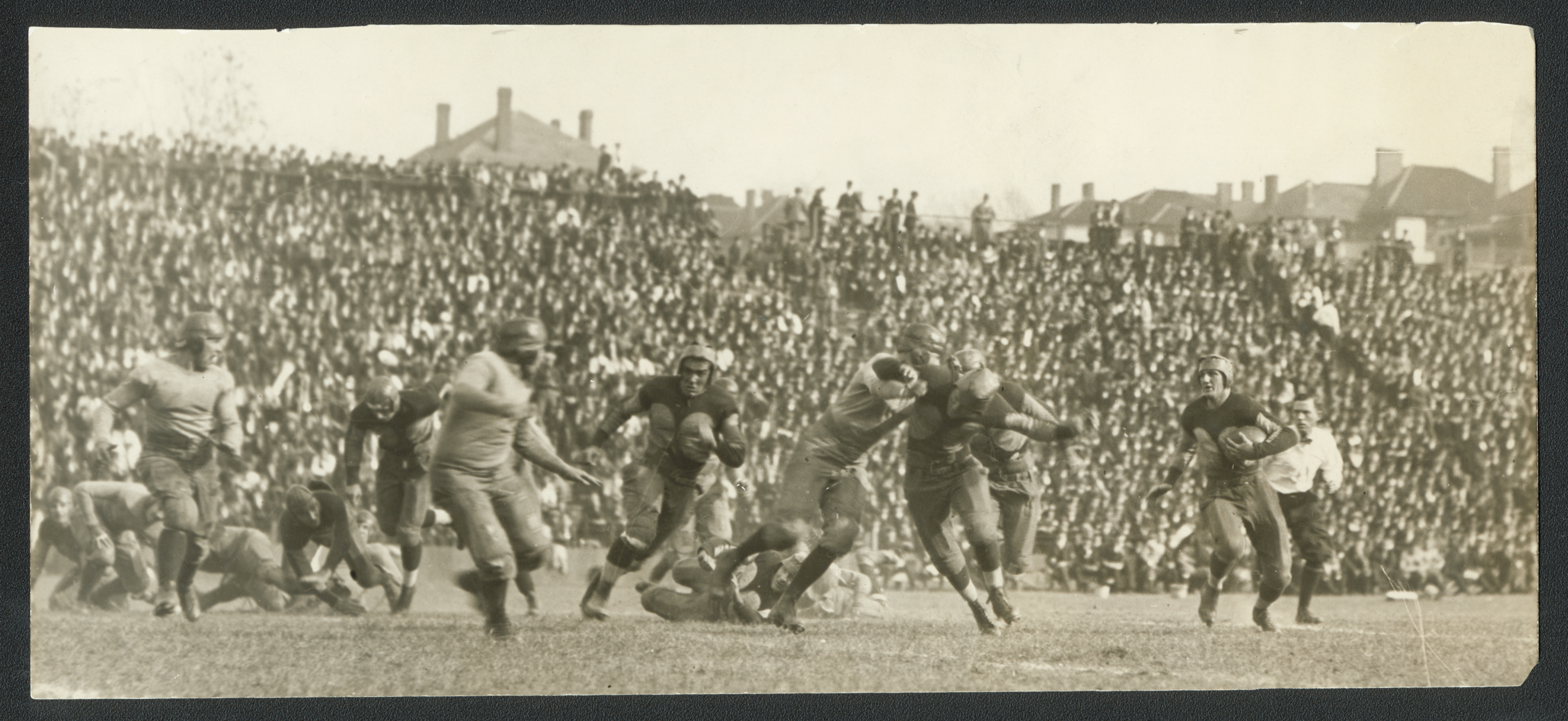
- Brewster in 1922.

Profile
- Position: Quarterback / Running back

Personal information
- Born: January 9, 1902; Newnan, Georgia, U.S.
- Died: August 20, 1998 (aged 96); Newnan, Georgia, U.S.
- Listed height: 5 ft 7 in (1.70 m)
- Listed weight: 155 lb (70 kg)

Career information
- College: Georgia Tech (1919–1923)

Awards and highlights
- Billy Evans's All-Southern (1922)

James David Brewster Jr. (January 9, 1902 – August 20, 1998) was an American gridiron football player.

== Biography ==
Brewster was born in Newnan, Georgia, in 1902. His father was the sheriff of Coweta County, and his mother, Margaret, was a homemaker. He graduated from Newnan High School, then attended the Georgia School of Technology (Georgia Tech).

Brewster played college football during 1919–1923 for the Georgia Tech football team. His fancy footwork earned him the nickname "the Side-Stepping Wonder." He was selected to the 1922 College Football All-Southern Team by Billy Evans. A member of Alpha Tau Omega, he graduated from Georgia Tech with a degree in textile engineering.

Brewster went on to play professionally in the 1926 American Football League for the Newark Bears, along with several other former Georgia Tech players including Vaughan Connelly, Ike Williams, and Doug Wycoff.

Brewster served in the United States Army during World War II. He later worked in farm and pulpwood management. He died in his hometown in 1998, aged 96.
