= Ty Griffin =

American baseball player (born 1967)

- Second baseman
- Born: September 5, 1967 (age 58); Fort Campbell, Kentucky, U.S.
- Bats: Switch Throws: Right
- Stats at Baseball Reference
Medals
Men's baseball
Representing United States
Olympic Games
Gold medal – first place	1988 Seoul	Team
Baseball World Cup
Silver medal – second place	1988 Rome	Team
Pan American Games
Silver medal – second place	1987 Indianapolis	Team

Tyrome Vontrace Griffin (born September 5, 1967) is an American former professional baseball second baseman. He played in minor league baseball and in international competition for the United States national team.

== Career ==
Griffin attended C. Leon King High School and the Georgia Institute of Technology, where he played for the Georgia Tech Yellow Jackets baseball team in the Atlantic Coast Conference (ACC). At Georgia Tech, Griffin was named an All-ACC second baseman and the Most Valuable Player of the 1988 ACC baseball tournament.

Griffin was part of the United States national team competing in the 1987 Pan American Games and 1988 Summer Olympics.

The Chicago Cubs drafted Griffin in the first round (ninth overall) of the 1988 Major League Baseball draft. He made his professional debut with the Peoria Chiefs of the Class-A Midwest League in 1989, and was promoted to the Charlotte Knights of the Class-AA Southern League that year. Baseball America rated Griffin the 22nd best prospect in baseball prior to the 1990 season. He split the 1990 and 1991 seasons between the Winston-Salem Spirits of the Class-A Advanced Carolina League and Charlotte.

The Cubs traded Griffin to the Cincinnati Reds for Scott Bryant after the 1991 season. The Reds assigned Griffin to their Southern League affiliate, the Chattanooga Lookouts. The Reds released him after the season, and Griffin joined the independent Northern League, where he played for the Thunder Bay Whiskey Jacks in 1993 and the Sioux City Explorers in 1993. He signed with the St. Louis Cardinals and played for the Arkansas Travelers in the Double-A Texas League in 1995, serving as a replacement player during spring training. He returned to independent baseball in 1996 and 1997, playing for the Grand Forks Varmints of the Prairie League.
