= Ray Blemker =

American baseball player (1937–1994)

Ray 'Bud' Blemker
- Pitcher
- Born: August 9, 1937; Huntingburg, Indiana, U.S.
- Died: February 15, 1994 (aged 56); Evansville, Indiana, U.S.
- Batted: Right Threw: Left

MLB debut
- July 3, 1960, for the Kansas City Athletics

Last MLB appearance
- July 3, 1960, for the Kansas City Athletics

MLB statistics
- Games pitched: 1
- Earned run average: 27.00
- Strikeouts: 0
- Innings pitched: 12/3
- Stats at Baseball Reference

Teams
- Kansas City Athletics (1960)

Ray Blemker (August 9, 1937 – February 15, 1994) was an American professional baseball player. The left-handed pitcher appeared in a single Major League game as a member of the Kansas City Athletics during the 1960 season.

Born in Huntingburg, Indiana, Blemker attended Georgia Tech, where he was a two-sport star. He was a second team All-America as a pitcher and first baseman for the "Ramblin' Wreck", as well as a two-time All-Southeastern Conference basketball player. As of 2013, he ranked #25 in career scoring in Yellow Jackets' history. While at Tech he was a member of Phi Sigma Kappa fraternity.

Blemker was listed as 5 feet 11 inches (1.80 m) tall and 190 pounds (86 kg) during his pro baseball career. He signed with the Athletics in 1959 and spent his entire four-season career in the Kansas City organization.

He won a combined 13 games (losing nine) during a 1960 minor league season split between the Double-A and Triple-A levels. In midyear, he was recalled by the Athletics for his lone MLB appearance. On Sunday, July 3, against the Boston Red Sox at Fenway Park, he came into the game in the seventh inning in relief of Don Larsen with a runner on base and Boston leading 7–2, Blemker allowed the inherited runner to score, then proceeded to allow four additional runs on a grand slam home run by Willie Tasby. He also pitched the eighth inning and allowed a final tally, as the Red Sox won, 13–2.

In 12/3 big-league innings pitched, Blemker surrendered five earned runs on three hits, two bases on balls, one hit by pitch and one wild pitch. He did not record a strikeout. During his minor league career, he won 28 of 44 decisions (.636).

Blemker died at St. Mary's Medical Center in Evansville, Indiana, on February 15, 1994, at the age of 56.
