= 1944 Pittsburgh Panthers football team =

American college football season

1944 Pittsburgh Panthers football
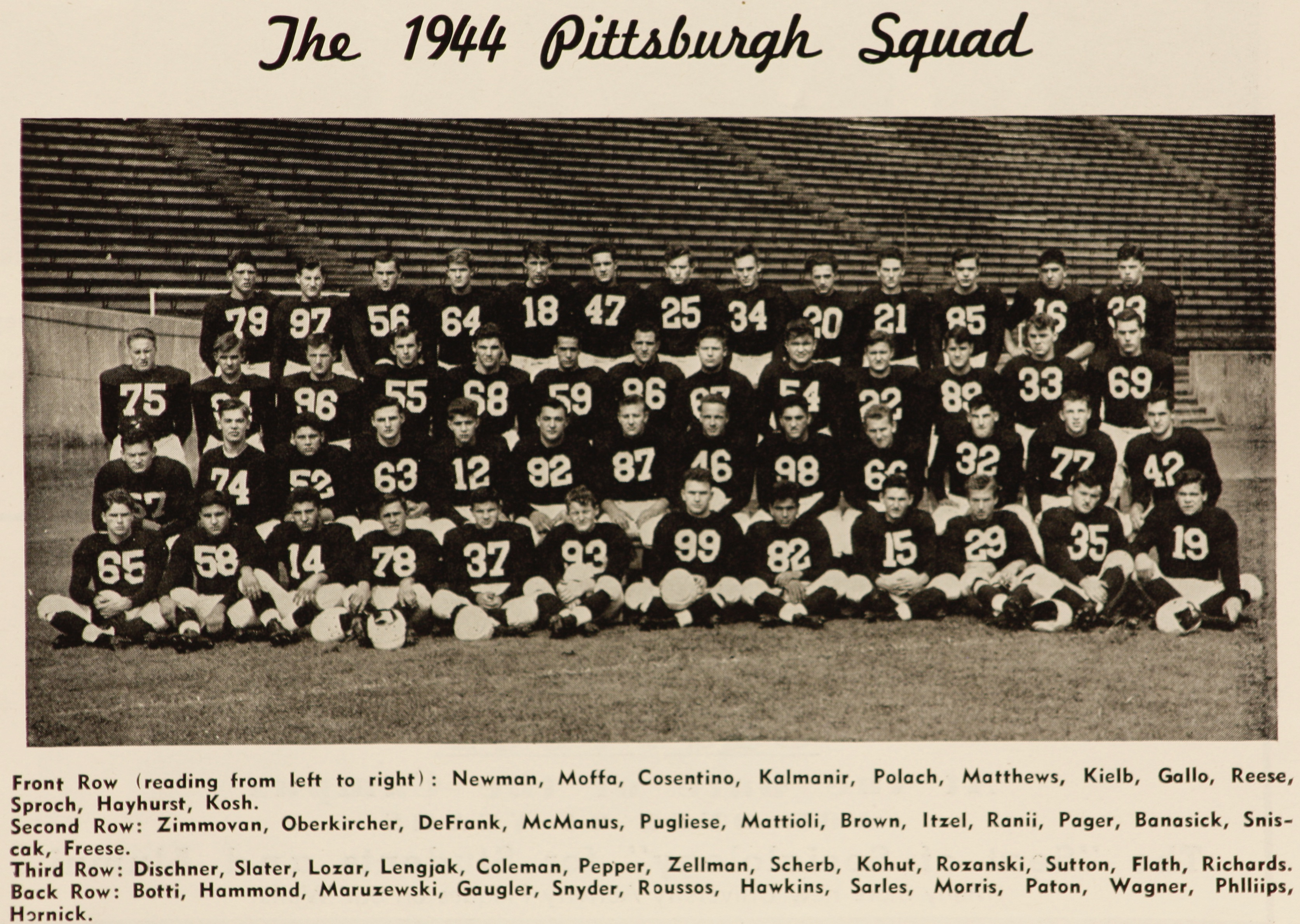
- Conference: Independent
- Record: 4–5
- Head coach: Clark Shaughnessy (2nd season)
- Home stadium: Pitt Stadium

1944 Eastern college football independents records
	Conf.			Overall
Team	W	L	T	W		L		T
No. 1 Army		–		9	–	0	–	0
Yale		–		7	–	0	–	1
Harvard		–		5	–	1	–	0
Bucknell		–		7	–	2	–	1
Penn State		–		6	–	3	–	0
Penn		–		5	–	3	–	0
Boston College		–		4	–	3	–	0
Cornell		–		5	–	4	–	0
Villanova		–		4	–	4	–	0
Drexel		–		2	–	2	–	0
Pittsburgh		–		4	–	5	–	0
Brown		–		3	–	4	–	1
Temple		–		2	–	4	–	2
Syracuse		–		2	–	4	–	1
Princeton		–		1	–	2	–	0
Dartmouth		–		2	–	5	–	1
Colgate		–		2	–	5	–	0
NYU		–		2	–	5	–	0
Columbia		–		2	–	6	–	0
Tufts		–		1	–	4	–	1
Franklin & Marshall		–		1	–	8	–	0
CCNY		–		0	–	7	–	0
Rankings from AP Poll

The 1944 Pittsburgh Panthers football team represented the University of Pittsburgh as an independent during the 1944 college football season. The team compiled a 4–5 record under head coach Clark Shaughnessy.

== Schedule ==
Date	Opponent	Site	Result	Attendance	Source
September 23	West Virginia	Pitt Stadium; Pittsburgh, PA (rivalry)	W 26–13	10,000	
September 30	Notre Dame	Pitt Stadium; Pittsburgh, PA (rivalry)	L 0–58	46,069	
October 7	Bethany (WV)	Pitt Stadium; Pittsburgh, PA	W 50–13	1,500	
October 14	at No. 3 Army	Michie Stadium; West Point, NY	L 7–69	10,000	
October 21	Illinois	Pitt Stadium; Pittsburgh, PA	L 5–39	10,000–15,000	
October 28	Chatham Field	Pitt Stadium; Pittsburgh, PA	W 26–0	8,000	
November 11	at No. 2 Ohio State	Ohio Stadium; Columbus, OH	L 19–54	26,566	
November 18	at Indiana	Memorial Stadium; Bloomington, IN	L 0–47	5,000	
November 25	Penn State	Pitt Stadium; Pittsburgh, PA (rivalry)	W 14–0	8,840	
Rankings from AP Poll released prior to the game

== Preseason ==
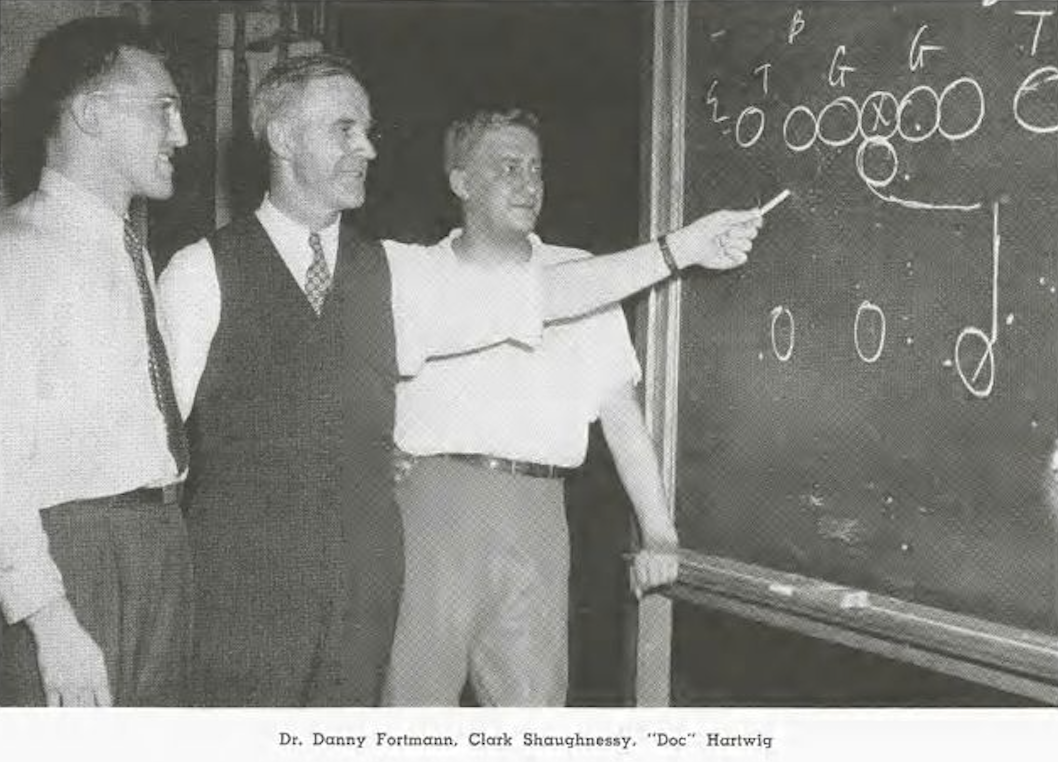
Coaches Clark Shaughnessy, Danny Fortmann and Doc Hartwig

The war effort continued to play havoc with college football rosters. Coach Shaughnessy held spring practice after summer registration so there would be more men to work with than the fifteen holdovers from the previous season. Fifty-four prospects reported for the team on June 15. On July 5, the practice site was moved to the old Shady Side Academy gridiron. Coach Shaughnessy was pleased: "We have had between 50 and 60 boys out at every drill. What's more they seem to enjoy it more as the practice gets tougher and we get beyond the preliminary work into the more exacting drills." On July 30, the Whites defeated the Blues 34–0 in the final summer intrasquad game. Shaughnessy was upbeat: "I am very much satisfied with the squad right now. We are potentially much stronger than at this time last year."

On September 1, 78 candidates reported for the first fall practice. Two-a-day sessions were held until the Wednesday prior to the opening game of the season. Seventeen holdovers from the previous season and plenty of freshmen filled out the roster. Two veterans of the 1942 squad, Angelo Carlaccini and Loren Braner were discharged from the ASTP Dental School and were able to play.

Former Pitt tackle and assistant coach, Bob Hoel, was rehired as an assistant line coach.

To generate ticket sales for the Notre Dame game, the Sports War Finance Committee offered 50-yard line seats to purchasers of war bonds ($18.75 and up). If one purchased a $10,000 bond (or higher), the fan could choose a seat on the Pitt bench, or a visit to the Notre Dame dressing room after the game.

== Coaching staff ==
1944 Pittsburgh Panthers football staff
Coaching staff: Clark Shaughnessy – head coach; Dr. Danny Fortmann – assistant coach; Charles Hartwig – assistant coach; Robert Hoel – assistant coach; Stan Olenn – assistant coach	Support staff: James Hagan - director of athletics; Frank Carver – publicity director; Jim Hellman – varsity student manager; Harold Whitson – property manager

== Roster ==
1944 Pittsburgh Panthers football roster
Player	Position	Games	Weight	Height	Class	Prep School	Hometown
John Anthony	halfback	0	162	6 ft	freshman	Jamestown H. S.	Jamestown, NY
James Barnicle	center	0	180	5 ft 9 in	freshman	Franklin H. S.	Franklin, PA
Michael Banasick*	halfback	6	178	5 ft 11in	freshman	Scottdale H. S.	Scottdale, PA
Frederic Botti	fullback	0	185	6 ft 2 in	freshman	North Union H. S.	Uniontown, PA
Walter Brajdich	tackle	0	164	6 ft	freshman	South Huntingdon Twp. H. S.	Yukon, PA
Loran Braner*	center	7	200	6 ft 2 in	Dental Sch.	Lancaster H. S.	Lancaster, PA
Jay Brown*	end	5	190	6 ft	junior	Schenley H. S.	Pittsburgh, PA
Richard Bruce	quarterback	1	170	5 ft 10 in	freshman	Massanutten M. A.	Harrisonburg, VA
Angelo Carlaccini*	halfback	6	165	5 ft 10 in	Dental Sch.	Tarentum H. S.	Tarentum, PA
Ralph Coleman*	center	9	206	6 ft	freshman	Ambridge H. S.	Baden, PA
Samuel Cosentino	freshman	0	180	5 ft 10 in	freshman	Avalon H. S.	Avalon, PA
Joseph DeFrank*	tackle	9	209	5 ft 11 in	sophomore	German Twp. H. S.	Footedale, PA
Edward Deichman	end	0	180	6 ft 1 in	freshman	Westinghouse H. S.	Pittsburgh, PA
Robert Dickey	end	0	168	6 ft	freshman	Rayen H. S.	Youngstown, OH
Matthew Dischner	guard	0	198	6 ft	freshman	Shaler Twp. H. S.	Etna, PA
John Douthitt	halfback	0	150	5 ft 7 in	freshman	South Hills H. S.	Pittsburgh, PA
Louis Falcone	halfback	0	160	5 ft 7 in	freshman	Brentwood H. S.	Brentwood, PA
Robert Flath*	tackle	5	190	5 ft 11 in	freshman	Greensburg H. S.	Greensburg, PA
George Freese*	fullback	7	176	5 ft 11 in	freshman	Wheeling H. S.	Wheeling, WV
Frank Gallo	quarterback	0	165	5 ft 8 in	junior	Vandergrift H. S.	Vandergrift, PA
Eugene Gaugler*	fullback	6	198	6 ft 2 in	freshman	Beaver Falls H. S.	Beaver Falls, PA
Ralph Hammond*	center	8	201	6 ft	senior	Allderdice H. S.	Fulton, MO
Robert Hawkins*	tackle	7	198	6 ft 3 in	freshman	Beaver H. S.	Beaver, PA
Robert Hayhurst*	guard	8	195	5 ft 11 in	freshman	Fairmont H. S.	Fairmont, WV
James Hornick	tackle	0	205	6 ft	sophomore	Peabody H. S.	Pittsburgh, PA
John Itzel*	fullback	5	190	6 ft	senior	Central Catholic H. S.	Pittsburgh, PA
Richard Johns	halfback	0	160	5 ft 9 in	freshman	PButler H. S.	Butler, PA
Charles Judd	fullback	1	190	5 ft 9 in	senior	Everett H. S.	Everett, MA
Thomas Kalmanir	halfback	3	165	5 ft 9 in	sophomore	Conemaugh Twp. H. S.	Jerome, PA
Joe Kielb*	quarterback	5	190	5 ft 9 in	senior	Schenley H. S.	Pittsburgh, PA
Edgar Kimmel	quarterback	0	160	6 ft	freshman	Penn H. S.	North Bessemer, PA
Leo King	halfback	0	169	5 ft 10 in	freshman	Peabody H. S.	Pittsburgh, PA
John J. Klein	tackle	0	180	5 ft 11 1/2 in	freshman	Homestead H. S.	West Homestead, PA
George Kohut*	guard	6	200	6 ft	freshman	Bethel Twp. H. S.	Coverdale, PA
John Kosh*	fullback	7	180	6 ft	freshman	Donora H. S.	Donora, PA
Frank Lengjak	center	0	167	5 ft 11 in	freshman	North Union H. S.	Uniontown, PA
John L. Lewis, Jr.	end	0	190	6 ft	sophomore	R. J. Reynolds H. S.	Winston-Salem, NC
George Linelli*	halfback	5	167	5 ft 9 in	sophomore	Peabody H. S.	Pittsburgh, PA
Paul Long	center	0	230	6 ft 1 in	freshman	Youngwood H. S.	Youngwood, PA
John Lozar*	fullback	7	180	5 ft 10 in	freshman	German Twp. H. S.	Adah, PA
Andrew Lovich	guard	0	150	5 ft 10 in	freshman	Monesson H. S.	Donora, PA
Owen McManus	center	4	195	6 ft 1 in	sophomore	St. Vincent H. S.	Pittsburgh, PA
Ernest Mandros	end	0	158	5 ft 10 1/2 in	freshman	South Hills H. S.	Pittsburgh, PA
Edward Maruzewski	end	2	185	6 ft 2 in	freshman	Bridgeville H. S.	Bridgeville, PA
Don Matthews*	halfback	9	165	5 ft 9 in	junior	Coatesville H. S.	Coatesville, PA
Francis Mattioli	guard	3	205	5 ft 10 in	Dental School	Har-Brack H. S.	Brackenridge, PA
Remo Moffa*	guard	5	188	5 ft 9 in	freshman	Altoona H. S.	Altoona, PA
Frank Morris	tackle	0	177	6 ft	freshman	Avalon H. S.	Avalon, PA
George Morrison	fullback	0	227	6 ft	freshman	Peabody H. S.	Pittsburgh, PA
Harry Munson	guard	1	175	5 ft 10 in	freshman	Millvale H. S.	Millvale, PA
Denver Newman*	end	9	174	5 ft 11 in	freshman	New Castle H. S.	New Castle, PA
Paul Oberkircher	guard	2	182	6 ft	sophomore	Strong Vincent H. S.	Erie, PA
John Pager	quarterback	0	176	5 ft 9 in	sophomore	St Veronica H. S.	Aliquippa, PA
Jack Paton*	end	8	176	6 ft	freshman	Sewickley H. S.	Sewickley, PA
Victor Pepper	halfback	1	175	5 ft 11 in	freshman	Central Catholic H. S.	Pittsburgh, PA
Harry Peterson	quarterback	0	170	5 ft 10 1/2 in	freshman	Ellsworth H. S.	Cokeburg, PA
Albert Phillips*	tackle	9	219	6 ft	freshman	Vandergrift H. S.	Vandegrift, PA
Steve Polach*	guard	6	165	5 ft 7 in	sophomore	North Union H. S.	Uniontown, PA
Richardo Pugliese	guard	1	173	5 ft 10 in	freshman	Vandergrift H. S.	Vandergrift, PA
George Ranii*	guard	9	210	5 ft 10 in	sophomore	Aspinwall H.S.	Blawnox, PA
Edward Reese	halfback	0	159	5 ft 8 in	junior	Peabody H. S.	Pittsburgh, PA
Paul Rickards*	quarterback	9	185	6 ft	freshman	Wheeling H. S.	Wheeling, WV
Michael Roussos*	tackle	9	213	6 ft 2 in	freshman	New Castle H. S.	New Castle, PA
John Rozanski*	tackle	7	215	5 ft 9 in	freshman	Plymouth H. S.	Plymouth, PA
Harvey Sarles*	end	9	178	6 ft 2 in	freshman	Butler H. S.	Butler, PA
Max Scherb	tackle	1	205	5 ft 11 in	sophomore	Allderdice H. S.	Pittsburgh, PA
Clem Schneider	end	4	195	6 ft 3 in	freshman	Central Catholic H. S.	Pittsburgh, PA
Charles Schultze	tackle	0	204	5 ft 10 1/2 in	freshman	Warwood H. S.	Wheeling, WV
Alfred Sisca	guard	0	155	5 ft 6 in	freshman	Shaler Twp. H. S.	Pittsburgh, PA
Edmund Slater	end	1	165	5 ft 11 in	freshman	North Union H. S.	Uniontown, PA
William Slosky	end	0	185	6 ft	freshman	E. Pike Run H. S.	California, PA
Bernard Sniscak*	halfback	7	160	5 ft 8 in	freshman	Lansford H. S.	Lansford PA
Michael Sprock*	halfback	8	160	5 ft 10 in	freshman	Ambridge H. S.	Ambridge, PA
James Suehr	quarterback	0	150	5 ft 7 in	freshman	Crafton H. S.	Crafton, PA
William Sutton	end	4	185	5 ft 10 in	freshman	Brownsville H. S.	Brownsville, PA
Charles Tomedolsky	end	0	165	6 ft	freshman	Glassport H. S.	Glassport, PA
Edward Velencic	halfback	0	165	5 ft 10 in	freshman	Glassport H. S.	Glassport, PA
Edward Wagner	end	0	174	6 ft 1 in	freshman	Penn H. S.	North Bessemer, PA
Robert Watkins	guard	1	160	5 ft 9 in	freshman	California H. S.	California, PA
Fred Wilson	center	0	190	6 ft	freshman	E. Pike Run H. S.	California, PA
E. Wojciechowski	tackle	0	200	6 ft 1 in	freshman	Vandergrift H. S.	Vandergrift, PA
Louis Yakopec*	halfback	6	155	5 ft 7 in	freshman	Aspinwall H. S.	Harmonville, PA
Albert Zellman*	end	6	175	6 ft	freshman	South Hills H. S.	Pittsburgh, PA
Edward Zimmovan*	end	9	184	6 ft 1 in	freshman	North Union H. S.	Uniontown, PA
* Letterman

== Game summaries ==
=== West Virginia ===
Week 1: West Virginia at Pitt

Team	1	2	3	4	Total
West Virginia	0	0	7	6	13
• Pitt	6	0	13	7	26

- Date: September 23, 1944
- Location: Pitt Stadium
  Pittsburgh, PA
- Game start: 2:00 p.m.
- Game attendance: 10,000
- Game weather: sunny
- Referee: Hol Slatz (DePauw)

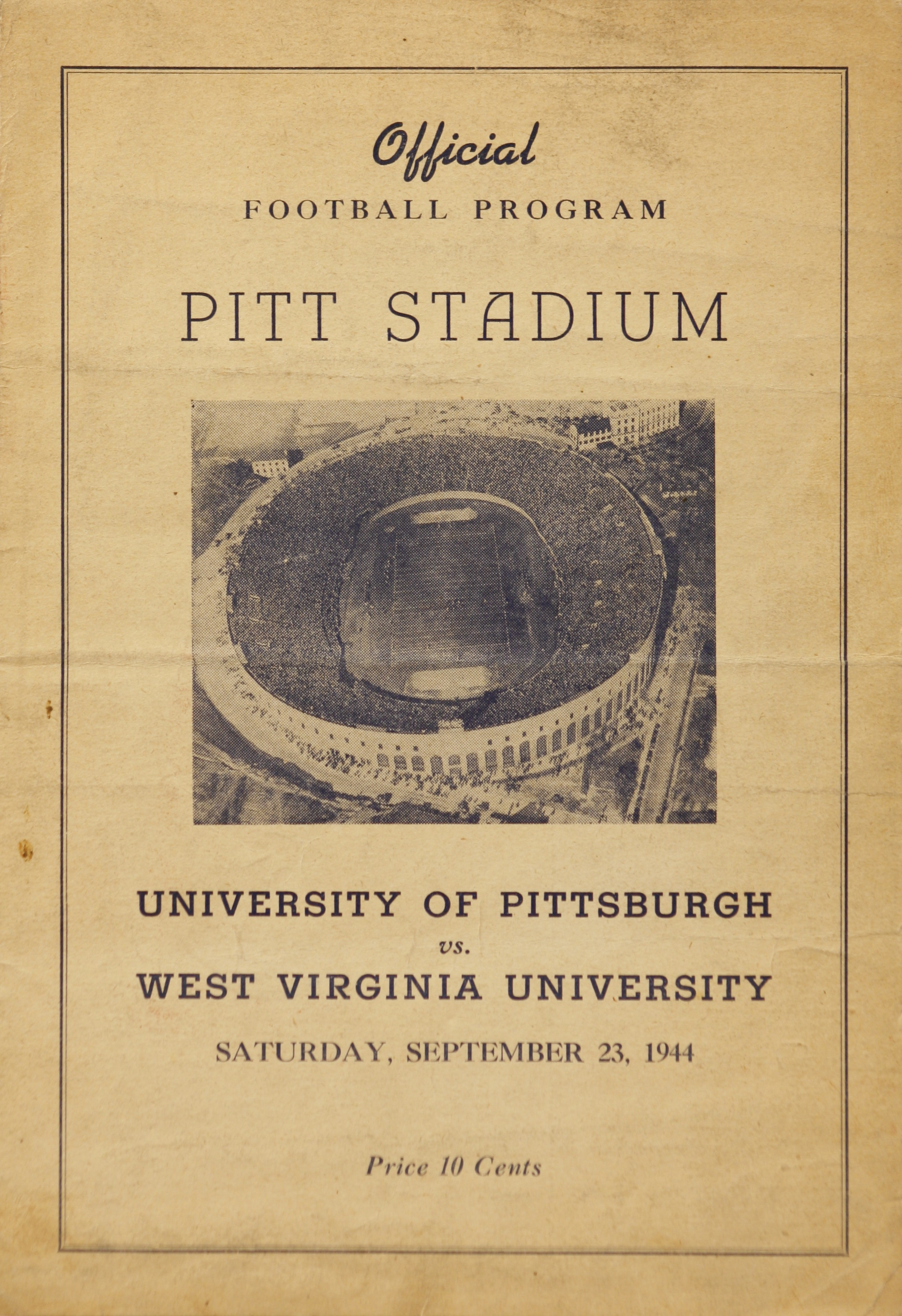
Roster sheet for September 23 game versus West Virginia

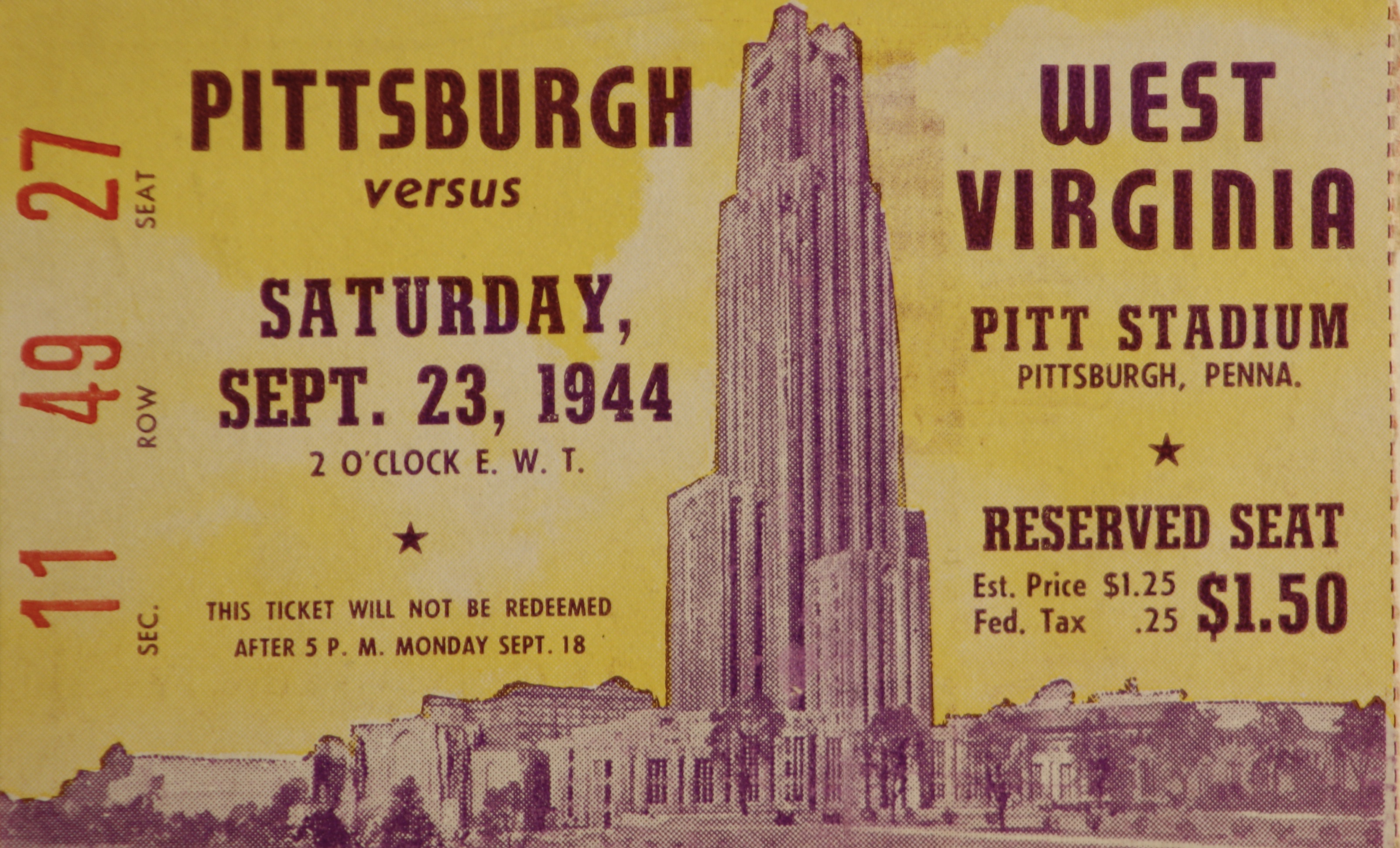
Ticket stub for September 23 game against West Virginia

On September 23, the Pitt Panthers opened the 1944 football season against Ira Rogers' West Virginia Mountaineers. The teams had met 37 times previously, with Pitt leading the series 27–8–1. West Virginia had not beaten the Panthers since 1928. The Mountaineers, like the Panthers, were made up mostly of freshmen and 4-Fs. The only holdovers in the West Virginia lineup were end, Bill Anderson; tackle, Charles Smith; quarterback, John Lucente and center, Russ Lopez.

Shaughnessy's Panther line-up had six freshmen and five holdovers. The returnees were Francis Mattioli and George Ranii at guard; Joseph DeFrank at tackle; Tom Kalmanir at halfback, and John Itzel at fullback. Tom Kalmanir was designated captain for the game.

The Panthers gained their first opening day victory since 1939 by defeating the Mountaineers 26–13. Tom Kalmanir scored his first touchdown in the opening quarter but Mike Sprock missed the extra point. The second quarter was scoreless, and Pitt led 6–0 at halftime. Early in the third period, the Panther offense drove 58 yards in 7 plays. Mike Sprock scored on a 2-yard run. Sprock missed the point after and Pitt led 12–0. After being shutout the five previous years, the Mountaineers managed to score twice. In the third quarter, Gus Rader scored from the 2-yard line to end a 7-play, 50-yard drive. Jim Walthall drop-kicked the extra point to cut the lead to 12–7. The Pitt offense answered with two long drives, both ending with 1-yard touchdown runs. After an 11-play, 62-yard drive, Tom Kalmanir scored his second touchdown, and John Kosh added the extra point. George Freese scored the last touchdown for the Panthers to end a 16-play, 78-yard drive, and he converted the placement. The Mountaineers added a late score on a 62-yard touchdown pass from Bob Haman to Leo Kesling. Tony Leone missed the placement.

The Pitt starting lineup for the game against West Virginia was Edward Zimmovan (left end), Joe DeFrank (left tackle), Francis Mattioli (left guard), Ralph Hammond (center), George Ranii (right guard), Michael Roussos (right tackle), Jack Paton (right end), George Freese (quarterback), Ted Kalmanir (left halfback), Michael Sprock (right halfback) and John Itzel (fullback). Substitutes appearing in the game for Pitt were Harvey Sarles, Edward Maruzewski, Denver Newman, Albert Zellman, Jay Brown, William Sutton, Edmund Slater, Albert Phillips, John Rozanski, Robert Flath, George Kohut, Richardo Pugliese, Robert Hayhurst, Steve Polach, Remo Moffa, Paul Oberkircher, Ralph Coleman, Owen McManus, Michael Banasick, Eugene Gaugler, Paul Rickards, Bernard Sniscak, George Linelli and Donald Matthews.

Scoring summary

Quarter	Time	Drive			Team	Scoring information	Score	
Quarter	Time	Plays	Yards	TOP	Team	Scoring information	West Virginia	Pittsburgh
1		4	26		Pittsburgh	Tom Kalmanir 1-yard touchdown run, Michael Sprock kick no good	0	6
3		7	50		Pittsburgh	Michael Sprock 2-yard touchdown run, Michael Sprock kick no good	0	12
3		7	58		West Virginia	Gus Rader 2-yard touchdown run, JIm Walthall kick good (drop-kick)	7	12
3		11	62		Pittsburgh	Tom Kalmanir 1-yard touchdown run, John Kosh kick good	7	19
4		16	78		Pittsburgh	George Freese 1-yard touchdown run, George Freese kick good	7	26
4		2	62		West Virginia	Leo Kesling 62-yard touchdown reception from Bob Haman, Tony Leone kick no good	13	26
"TOP" = time of possession. For other American football terms, see Glossary of American football.							13	26

=== Notre Dame ===
Week 2: Notre Dame at Pitt

Team	1	2	3	4	Total
• Notre Dame	6	13	26	13	58
Pitt	0	0	0	0	0

- Date: September 30, 1944
- Location: Pitt Stadium
  Pittsburgh, PA
- Game start: 2:00 p.m.
- Game attendance: 46,069
- Game weather: cloudy
- Referee: Rollie Barnum (Wisconsin)

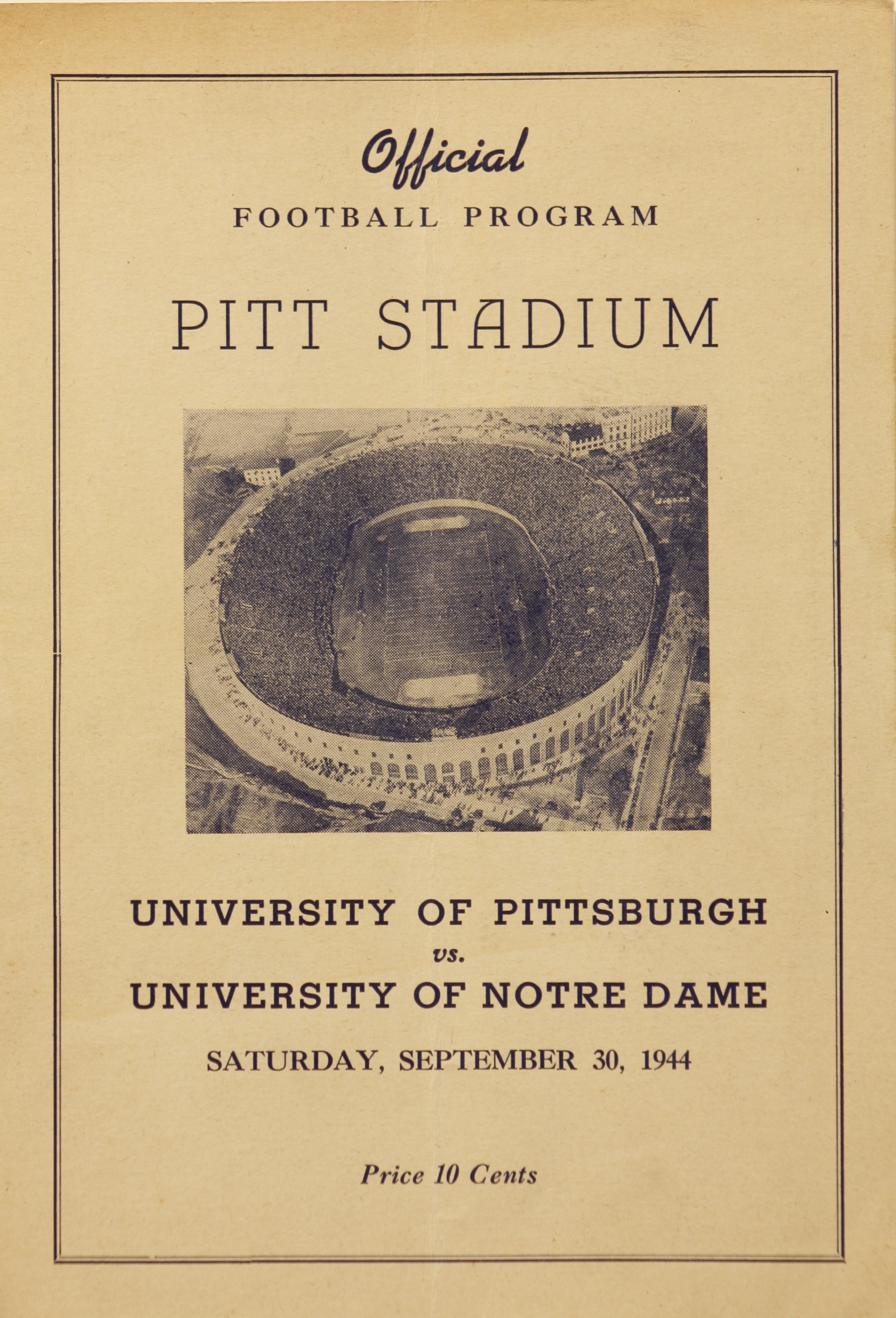
September 30 roster sheet for Notre Dame game

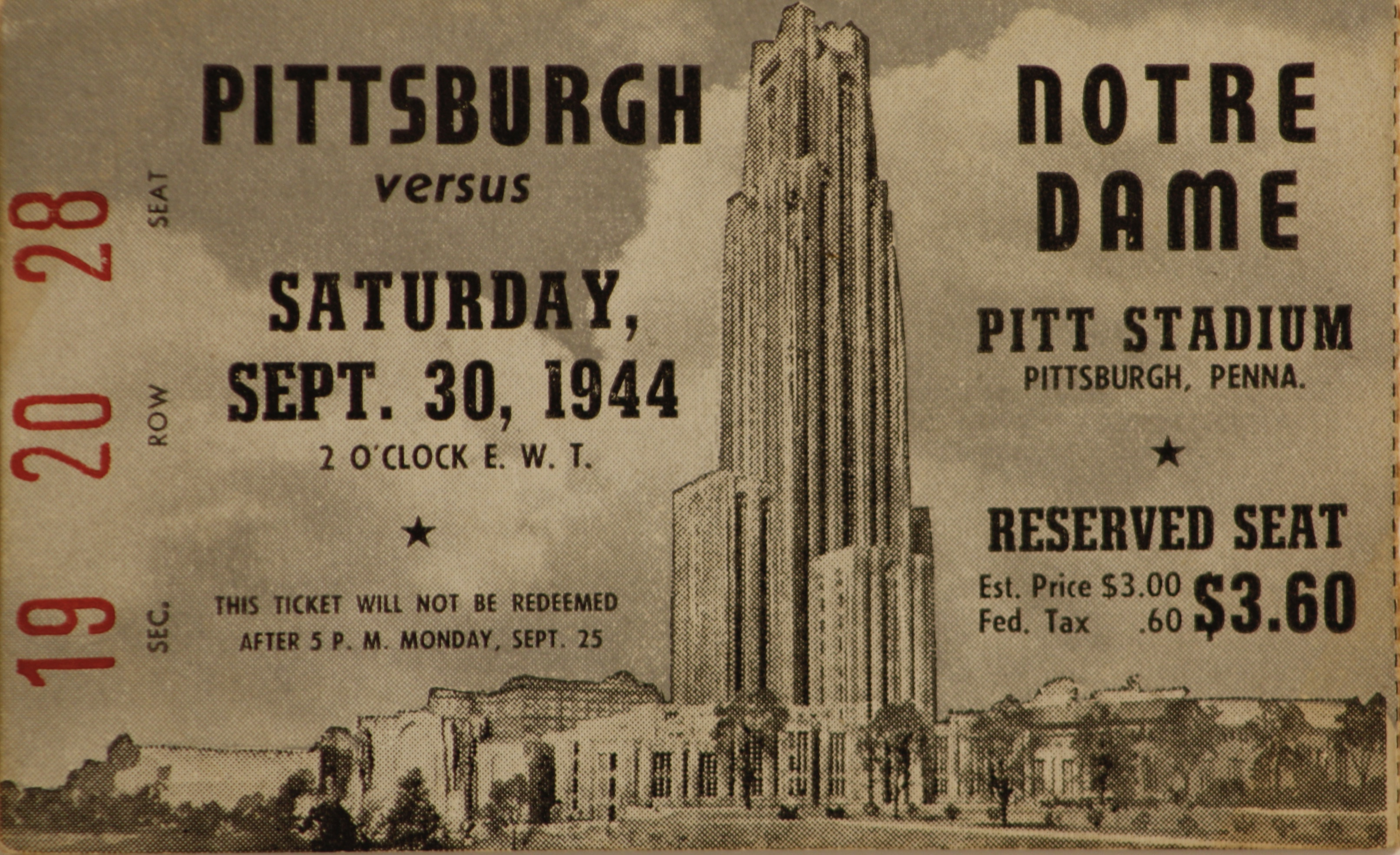
Ticket stub for September 30 game versus Notre Dame

After leading Notre Dame to the national title in 1943, head coach Frank Leahy entered the Navy and Edward McKeever replaced him for the 1944 football season. The Notre Dame lineup had three All-Americans: tackle George Sullivan; guard Pat Filley; and halfback Bob Kelly.

Pitt coach Shaughnessy was optimistic. "In fact," he said after last night's practice, "we'll be in there giving Notre Dame a tough battle all the way. We're definitely a much better team than we were at this time last year." Three changes were made in the Pitt lineup - Angelo Carlaccinini replaced Mike Sprock at right halfback; Ralph Coleman replaced George Ranni at right guard; and George Kohut replaced Joe DeFrank at left tackle.

The defending National Champion Irish squad humiliated the Panthers 58 to 0. All-America halfback Bob Kelly scored the first 4 touchdowns. His first two were touchdown receptions from quarterback Frank Dancewicz. The third was a 4-yard scamper that came late in the second quarter. Kelly missed the first two extra points, but he converted the third and Notre Dame led 19–0 at halftime. Kelly ended his banner day with an 84-yard run to start the second half. His conversion was good to make the score Kelly 26 to Pitt 0. Kelly gained 232 yards – 138 on 11 carries, 52 on two pass receptions and a 42-yard punt return. The Irish substitutes scored 3 more touchdowns in the third stanza and 2 in the final period.

Statistics-wise the Panthers were inept. The Pitt offense fumbled 9 times and Notre Dame recovered 6 of them. The Irish defense intercepted 6 Panther passes. Notre Dame gained 499 yards on offense and held the Panthers to 146 yards.

Jane Flaccus, a Sewickley socialite, purchased a $10,000 war bond and designated Yeoman Rita Hanson of the Coast Guard Women's Reserve (SPARS) to sit on the Panther bench for the game. Possibly the first woman to have that honor. Thanks to another donor, Louis Matsic of St. Paul's Orphanage visited the Notre Dame locker room after the game.

The Pitt starting lineup for the game against Notre Dame was Jack Paton (left end), Michael Roussos (left tackle), Francis Mattioli (left guard), Ralph Hammond (center), Ralph Coleman (right guard), George Kohut (right ackle), Edward Zimmovan (right end), George Freese (quarterback), Ted Kalmanir (left halfback), Angelo Carlaccini (right halfback) and John Itzel (fullback). Substitutes appearing in the game for Pitt were Harvey Sarles, Denver Newman, Albert Zellman, Jay Brown, Edward Maruzewski, William Sutton, Maxwell Scherb, Albert Phillips, Joe DeFrank, Harry Munson, Robert Watkins, Steve Polach, Remo Moffa, George Ranii, Paul Oberkircher, Loren Braner, Eugene Gaugler, Donald Matthews, John Kosh, Paul Rickards, Bernard Sniscak, Joe Kielb, George Linelli and Michael Banasick.

Scoring summary

Quarter	Time	Drive			Team	Scoring information	Score	
Quarter	Time	Plays	Yards	TOP	Team	Scoring information	Notre Dame	Pittsburgh
1		10	80		Notre Dame	Robert Kelly 38-yard touchdown reception from Frank Dancewicz, Robert Kelly kick no good	6	0
2		4	13		Notre Dame	Robert Kelly 15-yard touchdown reception from Frank Dancewicz, Robert Kelly kick no good	12	0
2		12	81		Notre Dame	Robert Kelly 4-yard touchdown run, Robert Kelly kick good	19	0
3		3	70		Notre Dame	Robert Kelly 84-yard touchdown run, Robert Kelly kick good	26	0
3		4	25		Notre Dame	Bill O'Connor 8-yard touchdown reception from Frank Dancewicz, George Terlep kick good	33	0
3		2	57		Notre Dame	George Terlep 64-yard touchdown reception from Joseph Gasparella, Robert Kelly kick no good	39	0
3		6	17		Notre Dame	Joseph Gasparella 1-yard touchdown run, George Terlep kick no good	45	0
4		6	56		Notre Dame	Steve Nemeth 1-yard touchdown run, Steve Nemeth kick no good	51	0
4		2	24		Notre Dame	Mark Limont 22-yard touchdown reception from Joseph Gasparella, Steve Nemeth kick good	58	0
"TOP" = time of possession. For other American football terms, see Glossary of American football.							58	0

=== Bethany ===
Week 3: Bethany at Pitt

Team	1	2	3	4	Total
Bethany	0	0	6	7	13
• Pitt	6	19	7	18	50

- Date: October 7, 1944
- Location: Pitt Stadium
  Pittsburgh, PA
- Game start: 2:00 p.m.
- Game attendance: 1500
- Referee: A. L. Walsh (Springfield)

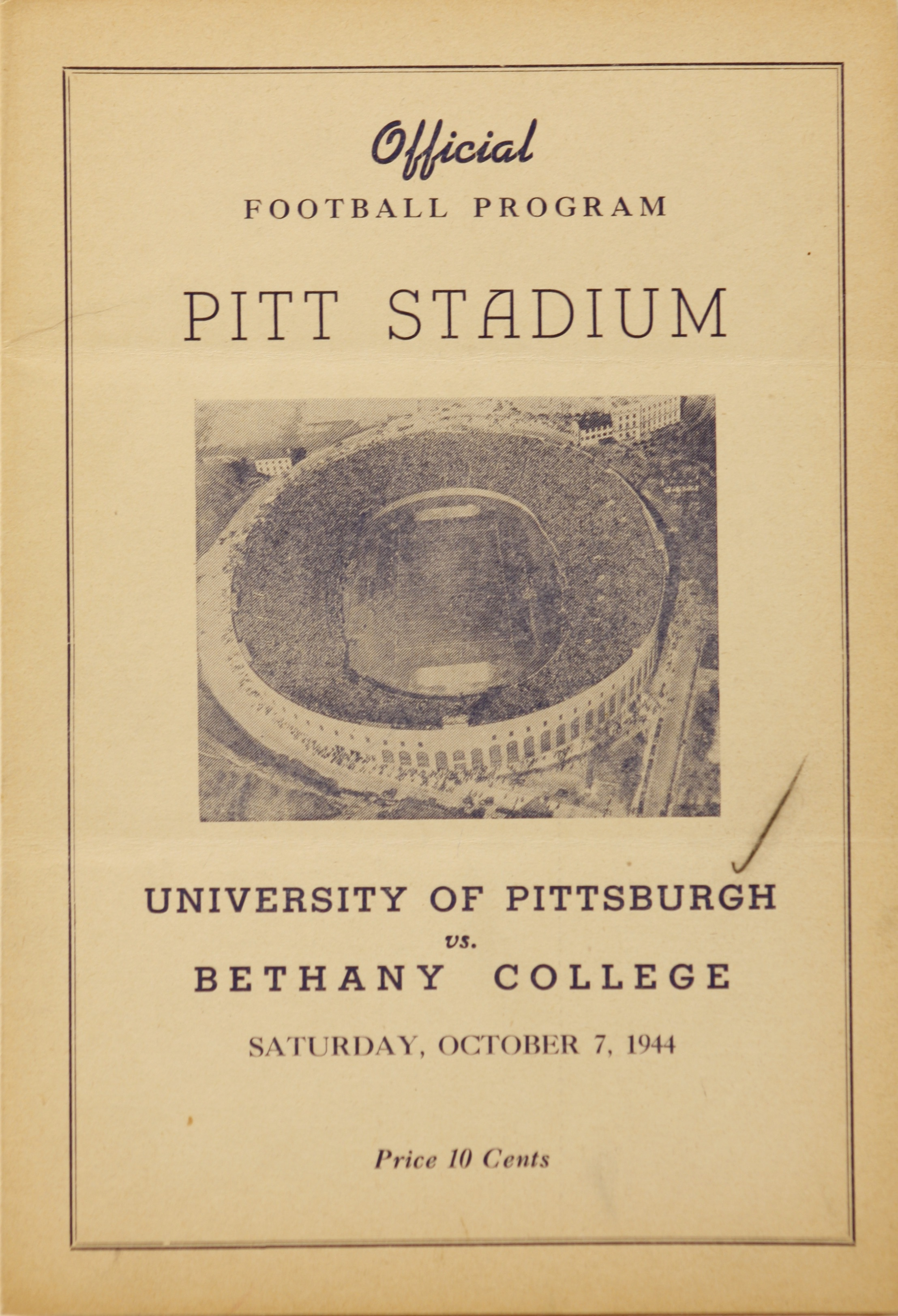
Roster sheet for October 7 game versus Bethany College

On October 7, the Bethany Bisons led by Coach John Knight met the Pitt Panthers for the final time on the gridiron. Pitt led the series 7–0 and the Bisons had yet to score on the Panthers. Three Bisons played for Pitt during the 1943 season: quarterback Joe Mocha, quarterback Cy Plazak and halfback Dan Owen. Bethany lost their opening game to Denison 40–12. Starting tackle Jack Jenkins and halfback Bob Doolittle were injured and unable to play against the Panthers.

Coach Shaughnessy appointed quarterback Joe Kielb captain and starter for the game.

In front of one of the smallest crowds in Pitt Stadium history (1500), Pitt beat Bethany 50–13. The Panthers took advantage of a weak Bethany defense and scored 8 touchdowns and two extra points. Bethany gained a moral victory by scoring 13 points. Tom Kalmanir led the Pitt scoring spree with 3 touchdowns. In the first half, he caught two touchdown passes from Paul Rickards, and then scampered 10 yards around right end to open the second half scoring. Harvey Sarles George Freese, Eugene Gaugler, Loren Braner and Mike Sprock tallied the remaining touchdowns. George Ranii and George Kohut converted the extra points. In the third quarter, Bethany's first score in the 8-year series came on an 11-yard pass from former Pitt quarterback Joe Mocha to Leo Short, which cut the lead to 32–6. Late in the game, Bison substitute halfback, Bobby White completed a 61-yard touchdown pass to former Panther Don Owen, and Bill Dreesen converted the placement to make the final 50 to 13.

The Pitt starting lineup for the game against Bethany was Harvey Sarles (left end), Joe DeFrank (left tackle), Francis Mattioli (left guard), Ralph Hammond (center), George Ranii (right guard), Michael Roussos (right tackle), Jack Paton (right end), Joe Kielb (quarterback), Ted Kalmanir (left halfback), Michael Sprock (right halfback) and John Kosh (fullback). Substitutes appearing in the game for Pitt were Clem Schneider, Robert Hawkins, Edward Zimmovan, Denver Newman, Albert Zellman, Jay Brown, William Sutton, Albert Phillips, John Rozanski, Flath, George Kohut, Robert Hayhurst, Steve Polach, Remo Moffa, Paul Oberkircher, Owen McManus, Loren Braner, Ralph Coleman, George Freese, John Kosh, Michael Banasick, Paul Rickards, Angelo Carlaccini, Bernard Sniscak, George Linelli, Louis Yakopec, Donald Matthews, John Lozar and Eugene Gaugler.

Scoring summary

Quarter	Time	Drive			Team	Scoring information	Score	
Quarter	Time	Plays	Yards	TOP	Team	Scoring information	Bethany	Pittsburgh
1		8			Pittsburgh	Harvey Sarles 11-yard touchdown reception from Joe Kielb, Mike Sprock kick no good	0	6
2					Pittsburgh	Tom Kalmanir 15-yard touchdown reception from Paul Rickards, Mike Sprock kick no good	0	12
2		8	33		Pittsburgh	George Freese 4-yard touchdown run, George Kohut kick good	0	19
2			51		Pittsburgh	Tom Kalmanir 7-yard touchdown reception from Paul Rickards, Angelo Carlaccini kick no good	0	25
3		9	69		Pittsburgh	Tom Kalmanir 10-yard touchdown run, George Ranii kick good	0	32
3			57		Bethany	Leo Short 11-yard touchdown reception from Joe Mocha, Bill Dreesen kick no good	6	32
3					Pittsburgh	Eugene Gaugler 21-yard touchdown run, George Ranii kick no good	6	38
4		1	23		Pittsburgh	Interception returned 23 yards for touchdown by Loren Braner, George Ranii kick no good	6	44
4		1	55		Pittsburgh	Interception returned 55 yards for touchdown by Miken Sprock, Michael Roussos kick no good	6	50
4		1	62		Bethany	Don Owen 11-yard touchdown reception from Bobby White, Bill Dreesen kick good	13	50
"TOP" = time of possession. For other American football terms, see Glossary of American football.							13	50

=== at Army ===
Week 4: Pitt at Army

Team	1	2	3	4	Total
Pitt	0	0	0	7	7
• Army	7	21	27	14	69

- Date: October 14, 1944
- Location: Michie Stadium
  West Point, NY
- Game start: 2:45 p.m.
- Game attendance: 10,000
- Game weather: fair
- Referee: Harry Dayoff (Bucknell)

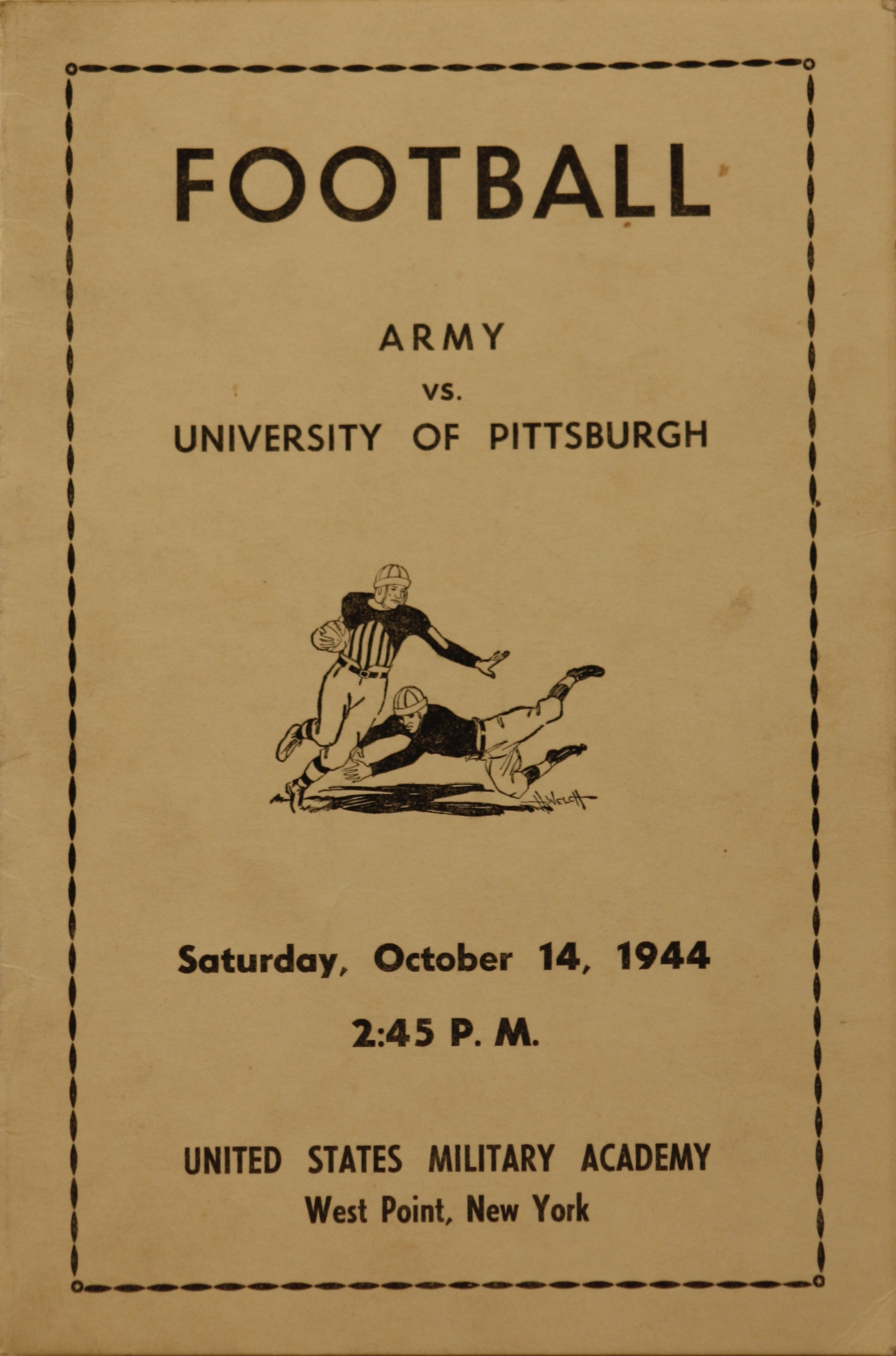
Roster sheet for October 14 game versus Army

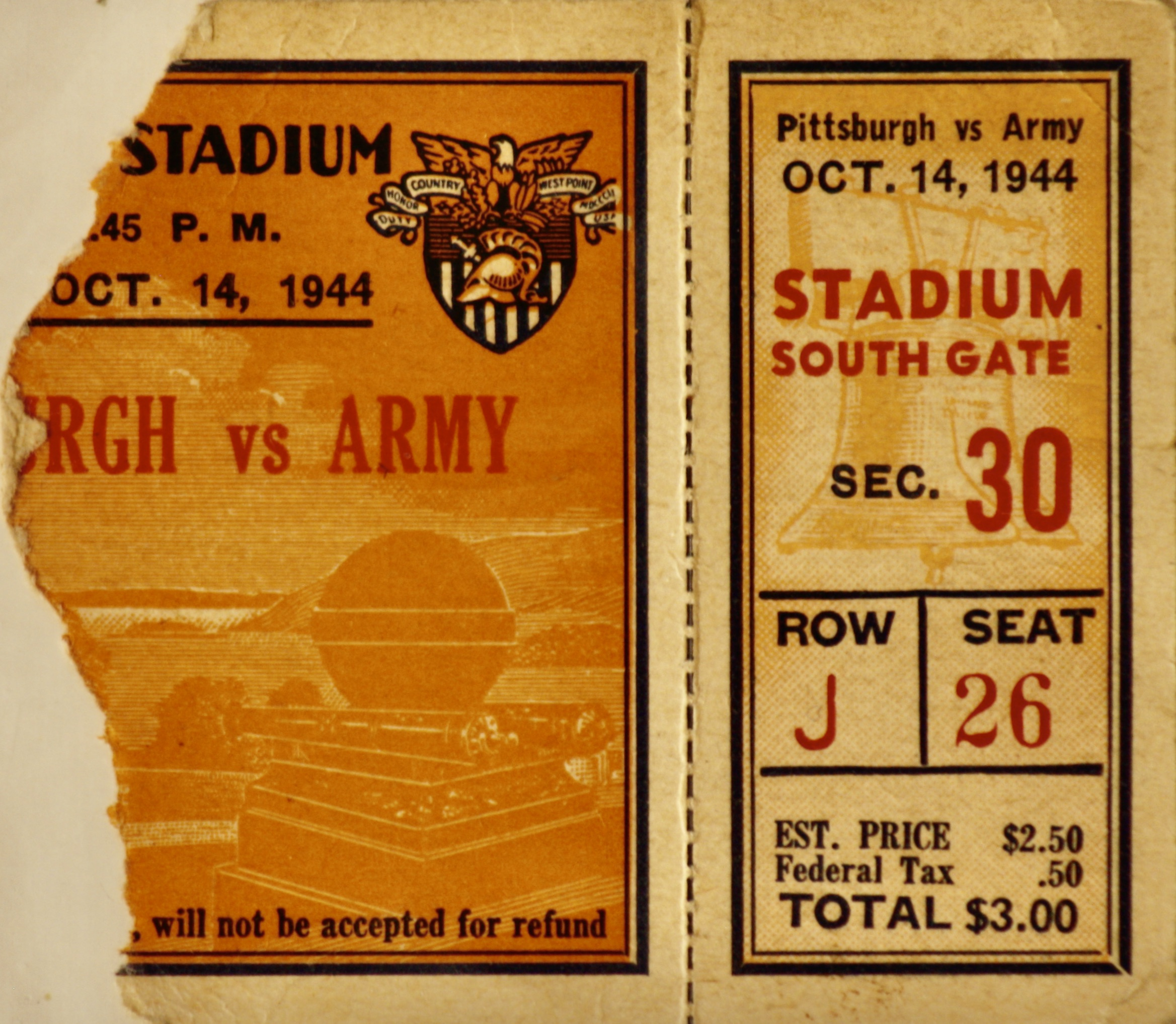
Ticket stub for October 14 game versus Army

On October 14, the Panthers played the Army Black Knights at West Point. The Panthers led the series 3–0, but the teams had not played since 1935. Fourth-year coach Earl "Red" Blaik had a lineup of All-Americans. Halfback Glenn Davis and fullback Doc Blanchard were consensus picks. End Barney Poole, guard Joe Stanowicz, guard John Green (guard) and quarterback Doug Kenna were named first team by at least one of the various selecting agencies. The Black Knights were 2–0, having beaten North Carolina 46–0 and Brown 59–7.

The Panthers lost starting guard Francis Mattioli for the season with a back injury and starting halfback Tom Kalmanir who joined the Army Air Corps. Coach Shaughnessy named guard George Ranii captain and started 3 freshmen linemen (end Robert Hawkins, tackle Albert Phillips and guard Ralph Coleman). Angelo Carlaccini replaced Kalmanir at halfback.

The 1944 National Champion Army Cadets ran roughshod over the Pitt Panthers 69–7. In the opening quarter, the Pitt defense held Army to one 13-play, 64-yard touchdown drive. The next nine Army scoring drives took 6 plays or less. Felix "Doc" Blanchard and Robert Dobbs each scored two touchdowns. Dean Sensanbaugher, John Minor, Glenn Davis, Barney Poole, Thomas Hayes and William West scored the others. Richard Waterhouse converted 9 of 10 extra points. Pitt managed a 15-play, 82-yard scoring drive in the last two minutes of the game. Eugene Gaugler went through center from the 1-yard line for the score and he added the placement to complete the scoring. Army finished the season #1 in the AP poll with a 9–0 record.

The Pitt starting lineup for the game against Army was Robert Hawkins (left end), Albert Phillips (left tackle), Ralph Coleman (left guard), Loren Braner (center), George Ranii (right guard), Michael Roussos (right tackle), Edward Zimmovan (right end), Rickards (quarterback), George Freese (left halfback), Angelo Carlaccini (right halfback) and John Kosh (fullback). Substitutes appearing in the game for Pitt were Denver Newman, William Sutton, Jack Paton, Harvey Sarles, Albert Zellman, Jay Brown, Robert Flath, Joe DeFrank, George Kohut, John Rozanski, Robert Hayhurst, Steve Polach, Remo Moffa, Ralph Hammond, Owen McManus, Michael Sprock, Michael Banasick, John Itzel, Eugene Gaugler, Donald Matthews, Joe Kielb, John Lozar and Louis Yakopec.

A color photograph of the game, taken by Theos Jardin Thompson, shows the Panthers in red jerseys at Michie Stadium. Pitt wore red and white from 1943 through 1945 instead of its traditional blue and gold.

Scoring summary

Quarter	Time	Drive			Team	Scoring information	Score	
Quarter	Time	Plays	Yards	TOP	Team	Scoring information	Pittsburgh	Army
1		13	64		Army	Robert Dodds 4-yard touchdown run, Richard Waterhouse kick good	0	7
2		2	57		Army	Dean Sensanbaugher 46-yard touchdown run, Richard Waterhouse kick good	0	14
2		1	20		Army	Interception returned 20 yards for touchdown by Felix “Doc” Blanchard, Richard Waterhouse kick good	0	21
2		4	82		Army	John Minor 1-yard touchdown run, Richard Waterhouse kick good	0	28
2		3	77		Army	Felix “Doc” Blanchard 17-yard touchdown reception from Thomas Lombardo, Richard Waterhouse kick good	0	35
3		3	43		Army	Robert Dobbs 5-yard touchdown run, Richard Waterhouse kick good	0	42
3		3	69		Army	Glenn Davis 64-yard touchdown run, Richard Waterhouse kick good	0	49
3		1	49		Army	Barney Poole 49-yard touchdown reception from Glenn Davis, Richard Waterhouse kick no good (wide)	0	55
4		6	77		Army	Thomas Hayes 22-yard touchdown reception from Arnold Tucker, Richard Waterhouse kick good	0	62
4		3	74		Army	William West 29-yard touchdown run, Richard Waterhouse kick good	0	69
4		15	82		Pittsburgh	Eugene Gaugler 1-yard touchdown run, Eugene Gaugler kick good	7	69
"TOP" = time of possession. For other American football terms, see Glossary of American football.							7	69

=== Illinois ===
Week 5: Illinois at Pitt

Team	1	2	3	4	Total
• Illinois	12	7	13	7	39
Pitt	3	0	2	0	5

- Date: October 21, 1944
- Location: Pitt Stadium
  Pittsburgh, PA
- Game start: 2:00 p.m.
- Game attendance: 10,000–15,000
- Game weather: perfect
- Referee: William A. Blake (Loras)

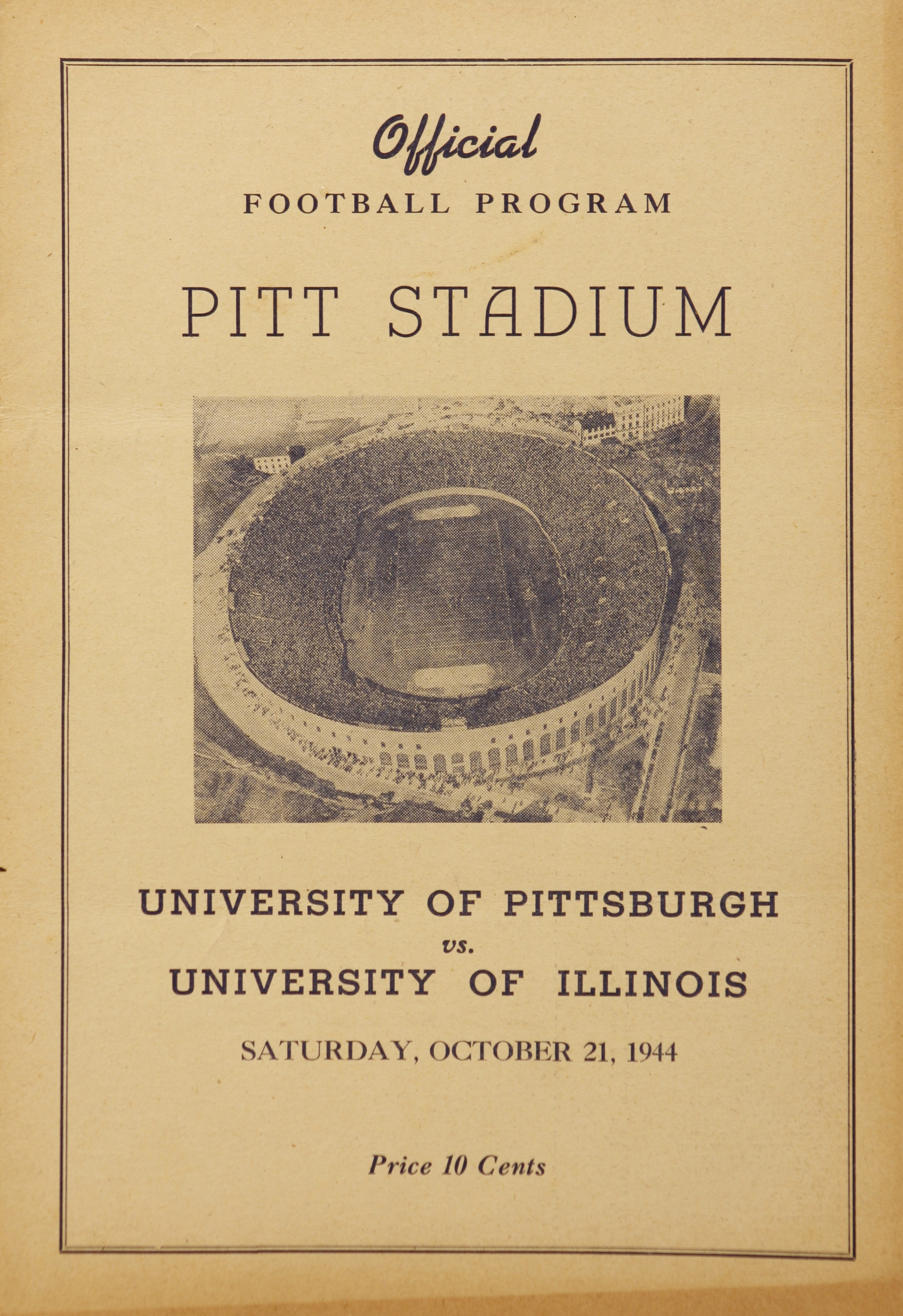
Roster sheet for the October 21 game versus Illinois

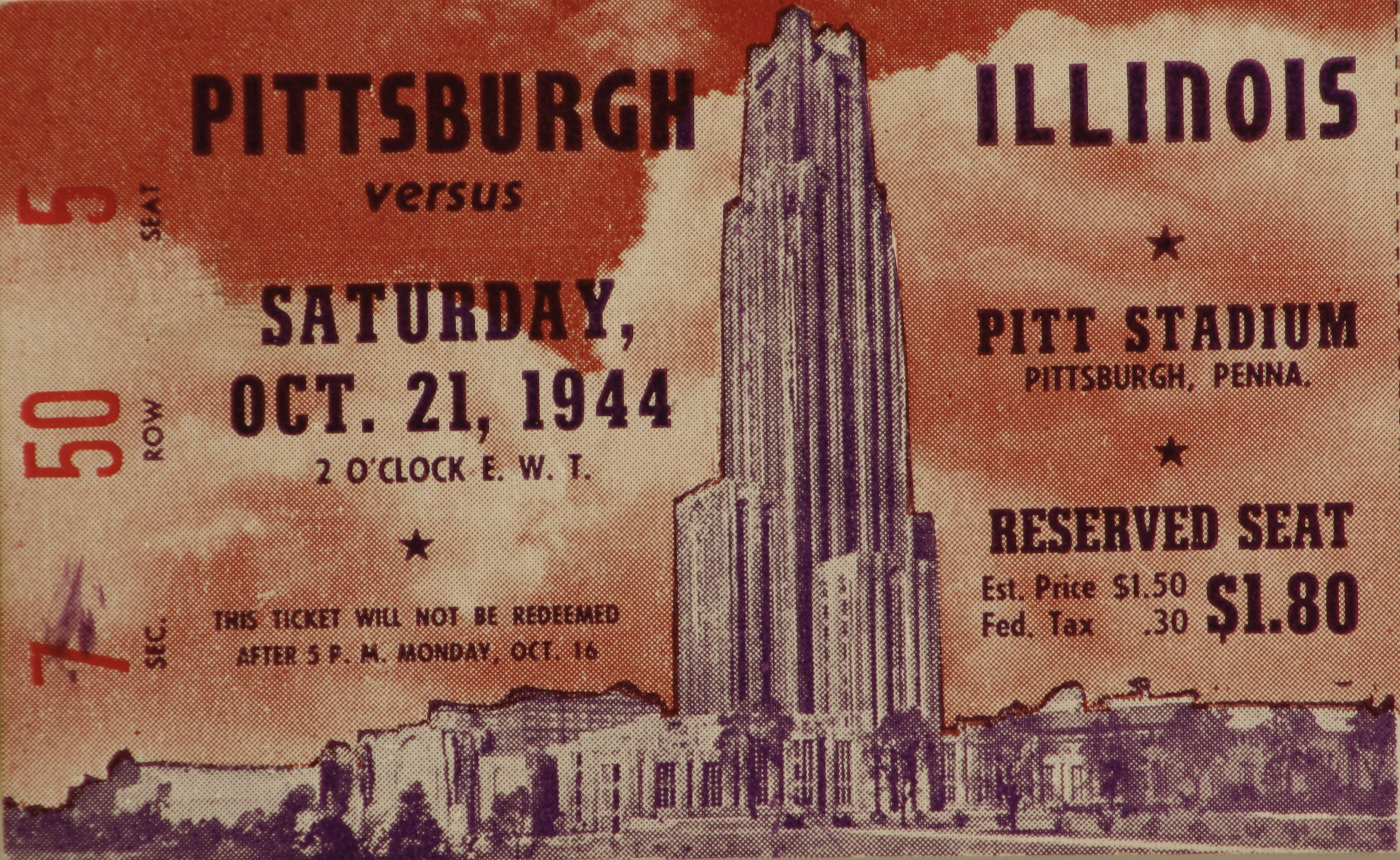
Ticket stub for October 21 game versus Illinois

On October 21, third-year coach Ray Eliot brought his Fighting Illini to Pitt Stadium. Illinois was 3–1–1 on the season. A loss to Purdue and tie with Great Lakes Naval Station were the only blemishes on their record. Offensively the Illini were led by future College Football Hall-of-Famer, halfback Claude "Buddy" Young and fullback Paul Patterson. Their line was anchored by one of the biggest men in college football, Lester Bingaman, who was 6 feet 2 inches tall and weighed 280 lbs.

The Illini game was the first of three Western Conference foes that the Panthers had on their schedule. Pitt was 0–10 against the Western Conference since the football program was de-emphasized. Last season the Illini hosted the Panthers and won 33–25. Coach Shaughnessey started Don Matthews at right halfback and Louis Yakopec at fullback. Loren Braner was designated game captain.

In front of 10,000–15,000 fans, the Panthers' futility against the Western Conference continued as the Illini scored 6 touchdowns to beat the Panthers 39–5. Pitt took the opening kick-off and advanced 54-yards, but had to settle for a 22-yard field goal by Mike Roussos. Illinois quarterback, Don Greenwood, returned the ensuing kick-off 80 yards for their first touchdown. The Panthers punted on their next possession and Illinois went 79-yards on 10 plays for their second touchdown. Don Greenwood missed both extra points and Illinois led 12–3 at the end of the first quarter. After an exchange of punts, the Illini had possession on their 6-yard line. On second down, Claude "Buddy" Young ran around right end 92-yards and Greenwood was good on the placement to increase the lead to 19–3 at halftime. The Illini added three touchdowns and two extra points in the second half. The highlight was a 62-yard scamper by Paul Patterson. The Panthers added a safety when tackle Al Phillips sacked Don Greenwood in the end zone. The Illini finished the season with a 5–4–1 record.

The Pitt starting lineup for the game against Illinois was Denver Newman (left end), Albert Phillips (left tackle), Ralph Coleman (left guard), Loren Braner (center), George Ranii (right guard), Michael Roussos (right tackle), Robert Hawkins (right end), Paul Rickards (quarterback), George Freese (left halfback), Donald Matthews (right halfback) and Louis Yakopec (fullback). Substitutes appearing in the game for Pitt were Edward Zimmovan, Jack Paton, Harvey Sarles, Albert Zellman, Jay Brown, Joseph DeFrank, Robert Hayhurst, Steve Polach, Ralph Hammond, John Lozar, Bernard Sniscak, Angelo Carlaccini, George Linelli, Michael Banasick, Michael Sprock, Joe Kielb, John Itzel and Eugene Gaugler.

Scoring summary

Quarter	Time	Drive			Team	Scoring information	Score	
Quarter	Time	Plays	Yards	TOP	Team	Scoring information	Illinois	Pittsburgh
1		7	54		Pittsburgh	22-yard field goal by Mike Roussos	0	3
1		1	80		Illinois	Kickoff returned 80 yards for touchdown by Don Greenwood, Don Greenwood kick no good	6	3
1		10	79		Illinois	Don Greenwood 5-yard touchdown run, Don Greenwood kick no good (wide left)	12	3
2		2	94		Illinois	Claude “Buddy” Young 92-yard touchdown run, Don Greenwood kick good	19	3
3		2	67		Illinois	Paul Patterson 62-yard touchdown run, Don Greenwood kick no good (blocked)	25	3
3					Pittsburgh	Don Greenwood tackled in end zone for a safety by Al Phillips	25	5
3		4	37		Illinois	Claude “Buddy” Young 4-yard touchdown run, Don Greenwood kick good	32	5
4		1	5		Illinois	Don Johnson 5-yard touchdown run, William Butkovich kick good	39	5
"TOP" = time of possession. For other American football terms, see Glossary of American football.							39	5

=== Chatham Field ===
Week 6: Chatham Field at Pitt

Team	1	2	3	4	Total
Chatham Field	0	0	0	0	0
• Pitt	0	0	0	26	26

- Date: October 28, 1944
- Location: Pitt Stadium
  Pittsburgh, PA
- Game start: 2:00 p.m.
- Game attendance: 8,000
- Game weather: sunny
- Referee: Thomas Timlin (Niagara)

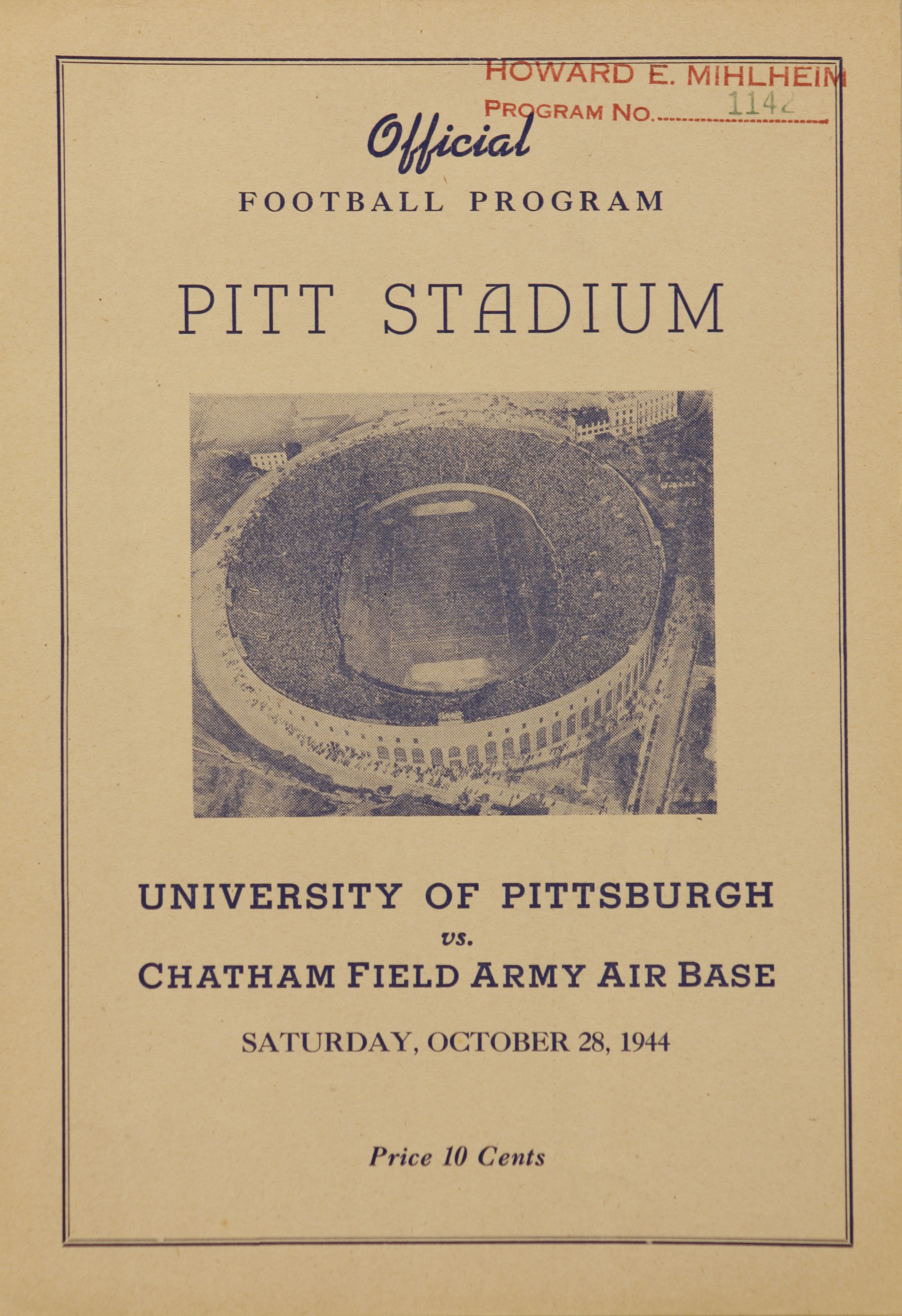
Roster sheet for October 28 game versus Chatham Field

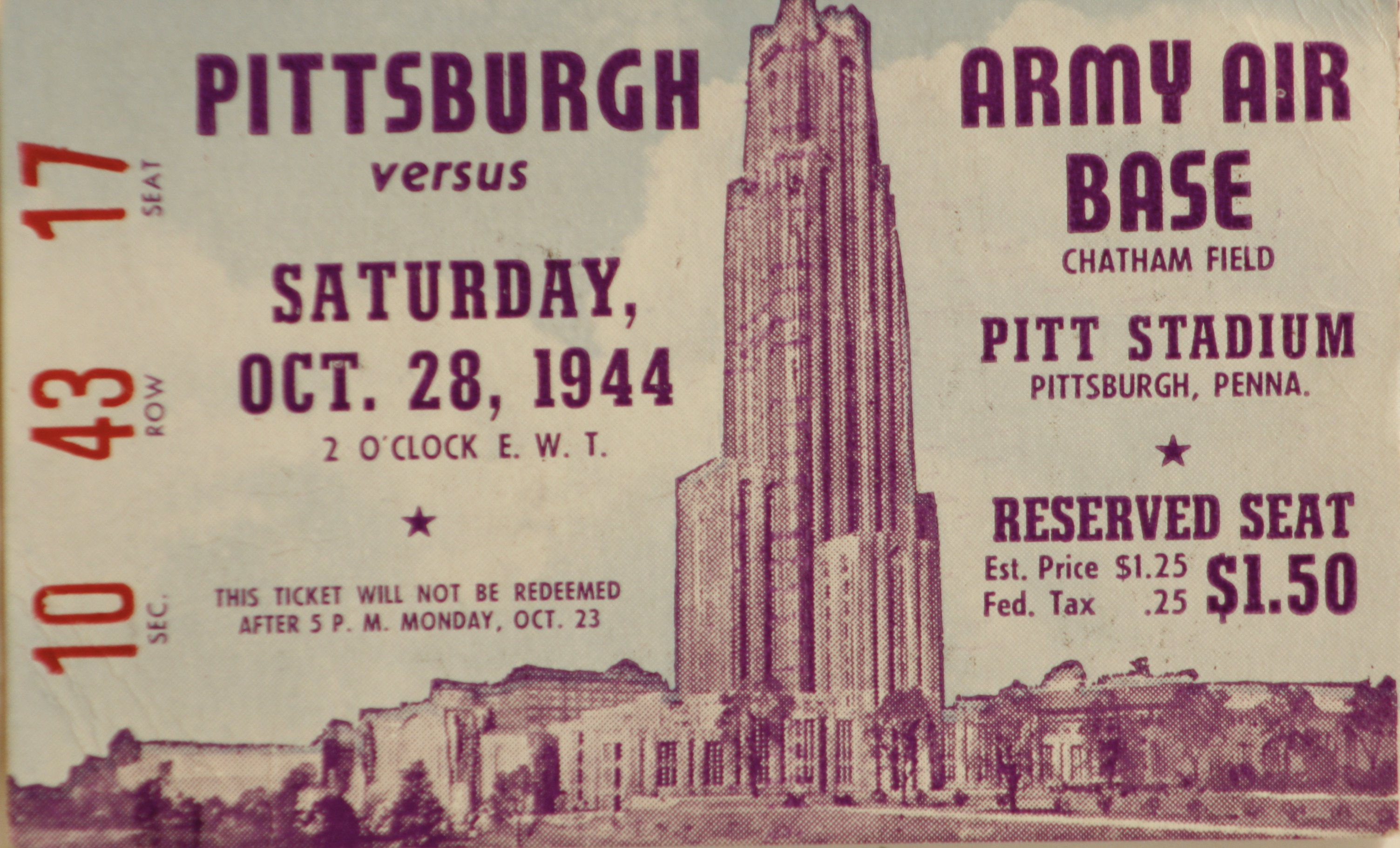
Ticket stub for October 28 game versus Chatham Field

After Carnegie Tech cancelled their football season, Pitt Athletic Director, James Hagan convinced the Chatham Field Army Air Base team to fill the spot in the Panther schedule. The Blockbusters were led by player/coach Art White and had a 1–4–1 record against mostly other service teams. Carl Hughes of The Pittsburgh Press described the make-up of the Chatham squad: "Unlike many service teams, Chatham Field relies only on men stationed at the base and does not 'import' name stars to augment the available manpower. Nine members of the squad have seen action overseas and are now instructors at the field. The remainder of the invaders who arrived at the airport last night by B-24 Liberators are pilots, bombardiers, navigators, aerial engineers, and other crew members who are not specializing in football, but find it a pleasant interlude between training classes."

Coach Shaughnessey bemoaned the injury situation: "I do not have a single back who is not crippled in one way or another." Louis Yakopec, George Freese, Eugene Gaugler and Loren Braner were injured in the Illinois game. Ralph Hammond was designated captain and replaced Braner a center. George Linelli replaced Freese at halfback and freshman Clem Schneider started at left end.

For three quarters the Panthers and the Blockbusters played scoreless football. Late in the third period, Pitt halfback Don Matthews intercepted a Chatham pass on the Blockbuster 38-yard line. On the fifth play, John Lozar went through center from 1-yard out and Pitt led 6–0. The extra point was blocked. On the first play after the kick-off, Eugene Gaugler recovered a Chatham fumble on the Blockbuster 32-yard line. Don Matthews ran the final 3 yards for the touchdown, but he was wide on the placement. Angelo Carlaccini capped a 10-play, 70-yard drive with a 2 yard plunge through center. George Ranii converted the point after and Pitt led 19–0. Pitt tackle, Al Phillips blocked a Chatham punt that rolled into the end zone and Pitt end Robert Hawkins recovered for the score. Ranii converted and Pitt won 26–0.

The Pitt starting lineup for the game against Chatham Field was Clem Schneider (left end), Albert Phillips (left tackle), Ralph Coleman (left guard), Ralph Hammond (center), George Ranii (right guard), Michael Roussos (right tackle), Robert Hawkins (right end), Paul Rickards (quarterback), George Linelli (left halfback), Donald Matthews (right halfback) and Louis Yakopec (fullback). Substitutes appearing in the game for Pitt were Harvey Sarles, Denver Newman, Edward Zimmovan, John Rozanski, Robert Flath, Joseph DeFrank, Robert Hayhurst, Steve Polach, Owen McManus, Jack Paton, Charles Judd, John Kosh, Michael Sprock, Michael Banasick, Richard Bruce, Angelo Carlaccini and John Lozar.

Scoring summary

Quarter	Time	Drive			Team	Scoring information	Score	
Quarter	Time	Plays	Yards	TOP	Team	Scoring information	Chatham Field	Pittsburgh
4		5	38		Pittsburgh	John Lozar 1-yard touchdown run, Mike Roussos kick no good	0	6
4		7	32		Pittsburgh	Don Matthews 3-yard touchdown run, Don Matthews kick no good (wide)	0	12
4		10	70		Pittsburgh	Angelo Carlaccini 2-yard touchdown run, George Ranii kick good	0	19
4					Pittsburgh	Blocked punt by Al Phillips rolled into the end zone and recovered by Robert Hawkins	0	26
"TOP" = time of possession. For other American football terms, see Glossary of American football.							0	26

=== at Ohio State ===
Week 7: Pitt at Ohio State

Team	1	2	3	4	Total
Pitt	0	0	13	6	19
• Ohio State	20	21	13	0	54

- Date: November 11, 1944
- Location: Ohio Stadium
  Columbus, OH
- Game start: 2:00 p.m.
- Game attendance: 26,566
- Game weather: cloudy
- Referee: Lloyd Larson (Wisconsin)

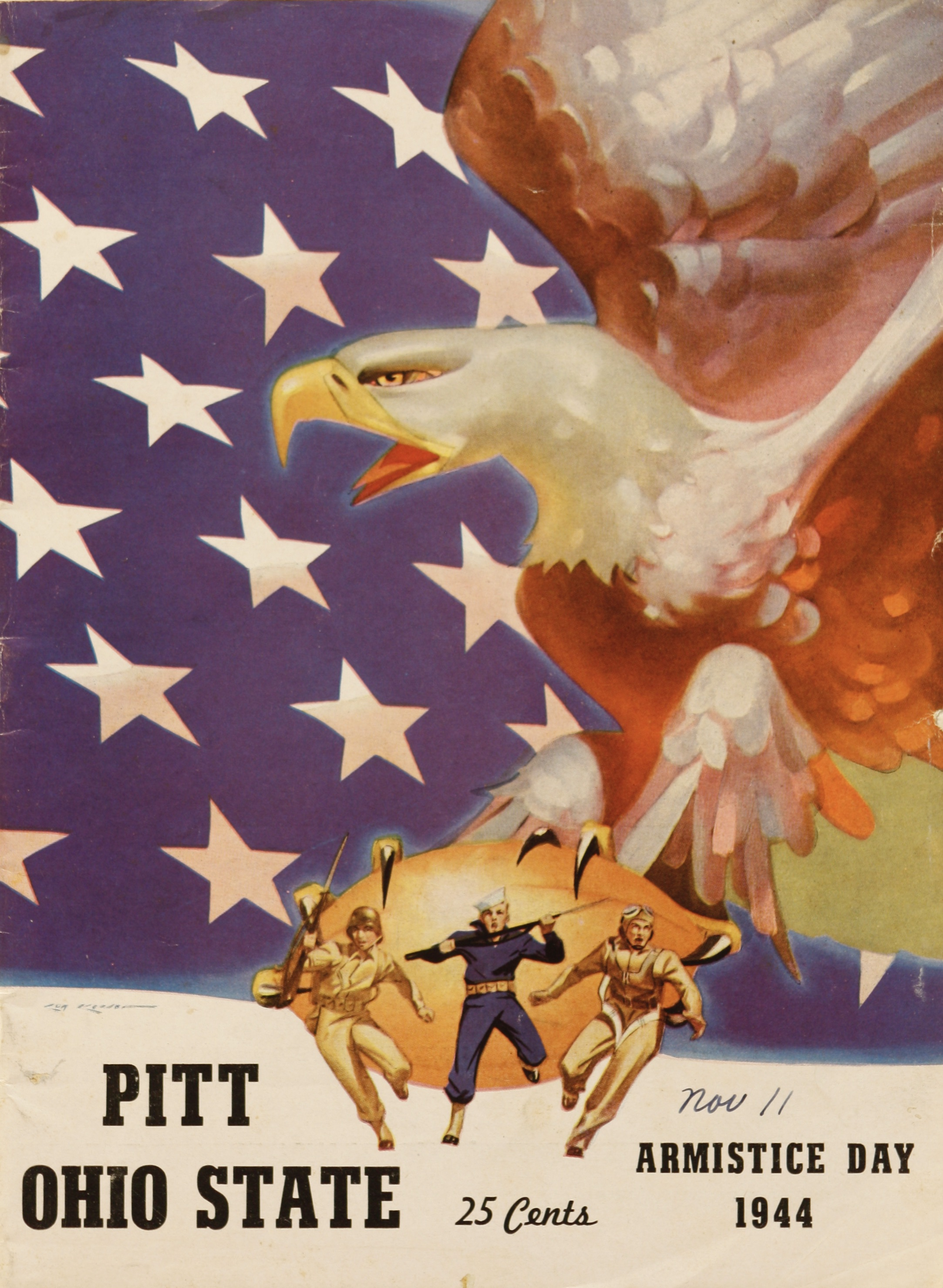
Program for November 11 game versus Ohio State

On November 11, the Panthers travelled to Columbus, Ohio to play first-year coach Carroll Widdoes' #2 ranked Ohio State Buckeyes. Ohio State was 6–0, and their lineup had four All-Americans (quarterback Les Horvath, center Bill Hackett, tackle Bill Willis and end Jack Dugger). Oho State led the all-time series 5–2–1. Since Jock Sutherland resigned as Pitt coach, the Buckeyes were 4–0 (outscoring the Panthers 156–46).

In front of 26,566 fans, the Buckeyes continued the Western Conference mastery over the Panthers with a 54–19 victory. Eight different Buckeyes scored a touchdown, Mardo Hamilton tackled Pitt quarterback Joe Kielb for a safety, and Jack Duggar and Tom Keane each added two placements. With the Buckeye substitutes playing the second half, the Panthers managed to outscore Ohio State 19–13. The Panthers went 68-yards on 3 plays for their first score. A 55-yard touchdown pass from Paul Rickards to end Edward Zimmovan put Pitt on the scoreboard. Their second score came after a 66-yard, 6-play drive with George Freese going over left guard from the 2-yard line. With less than two minutes remaining in the game, Paul Rickards threw a 28-yard pass to Harvey Sarles for their third score. After Pitt botched the first placement with a fumbled snap, George Ranii was good on the second, but missed wide on the third.

The Pitt starting lineup for the game against Ohio State was Edward Zimmovan (left end), Albert Phillips (left tackle), Ralph Coleman (left guard), Ralph Hammond (center), George Ranii (right guard), Michael Roussos (right tackle), Robert Hawkins (right end), Paul Rickards (quarterback), Bernard Sniscak(left halfback), Donald Matthews (right halfback) and John Lozar (fullback). Substitutes appearing in the game for Pitt were Harvey Sarles, Clem Schneider, Denver Newman, Joseph DeFrank, John Rozanski, George Kohut, Robert Hayhurst, Loren Braner, George Freese, John Kosh, Joseph Kielb, Angelo Carlaccini, Louis Yakopec, Michael Sprock, Jack Paton and John Itzel.

Scoring summary

Quarter	Time	Drive			Team	Scoring information	Score	
Quarter	Time	Plays	Yards	TOP	Team	Scoring information	Pittsburgh	Ohio State
1		5	45		Ohio State	Bob Brugge 32-yard touchdown reception from Les Horvath, Jack Duggar kick no good	0	6
1		1	2		Ohio State	Dick Flanagan 2-yard touchdown run, Jack Duggar kick good	0	13
1		1	15		Ohio State	Les Horvath 15-yard touchdown run, Jack Duggar kick good	0	20
2		1	43		Ohio State	Interception returned 43 yards for touchdown by Mardo Hamilton, Tom Keane kick good	0	27
2					Ohio State	Mardo Hamilton tackled Joe Kielb in end zone	0	29
2		5	34		Ohio State	Tom Keane 2-yard touchdown run, Tom Keane kick no good	0	35
2		7	65		Ohio State	John Motejzik 33-yard touchdown reception from George Gordon, Tony Stranges kick no good (blocked)	0	41
3		4			Ohio State	Gene Janecko 62-yard touchdown reception from Robert Dove, Ollie Cline kick no good	0	47
3		3	68		Pittsburgh	Edward Zimmovan 55-yard touchdown reception from Paul Rickards, George Ranii kick no good (fumbled snap)	6	47
3		7	58		Ohio State	Tony Stranges 23-yard touchdown reception from Tom Keane, Tom Keane kick good	6	54
3		6	66		Pittsburgh	George Freese 2-yard touchdown run, George Ranii kick good	13	54
4		1	28		Pittsburgh	Harvey Sarles 28-yard touchdown reception from Paul Rickards, George Ranii kick good	19	54
"TOP" = time of possession. For other American football terms, see Glossary of American football.							19	54

=== at Indiana ===
Week 8: Pitt at Indiana

Team	1	2	3	4	Total
Pitt	0	0	0	0	0
• Indiana	13	13	14	7	47

- Date: November 18, 1944
- Location: Memorial Stadium
  Bloomington, IN
- Game start: 1:30 (CWT) p.m.
- Game attendance: 5,000
- Game weather: cold
- Referee: Lloyd Larson (Wisconsin)

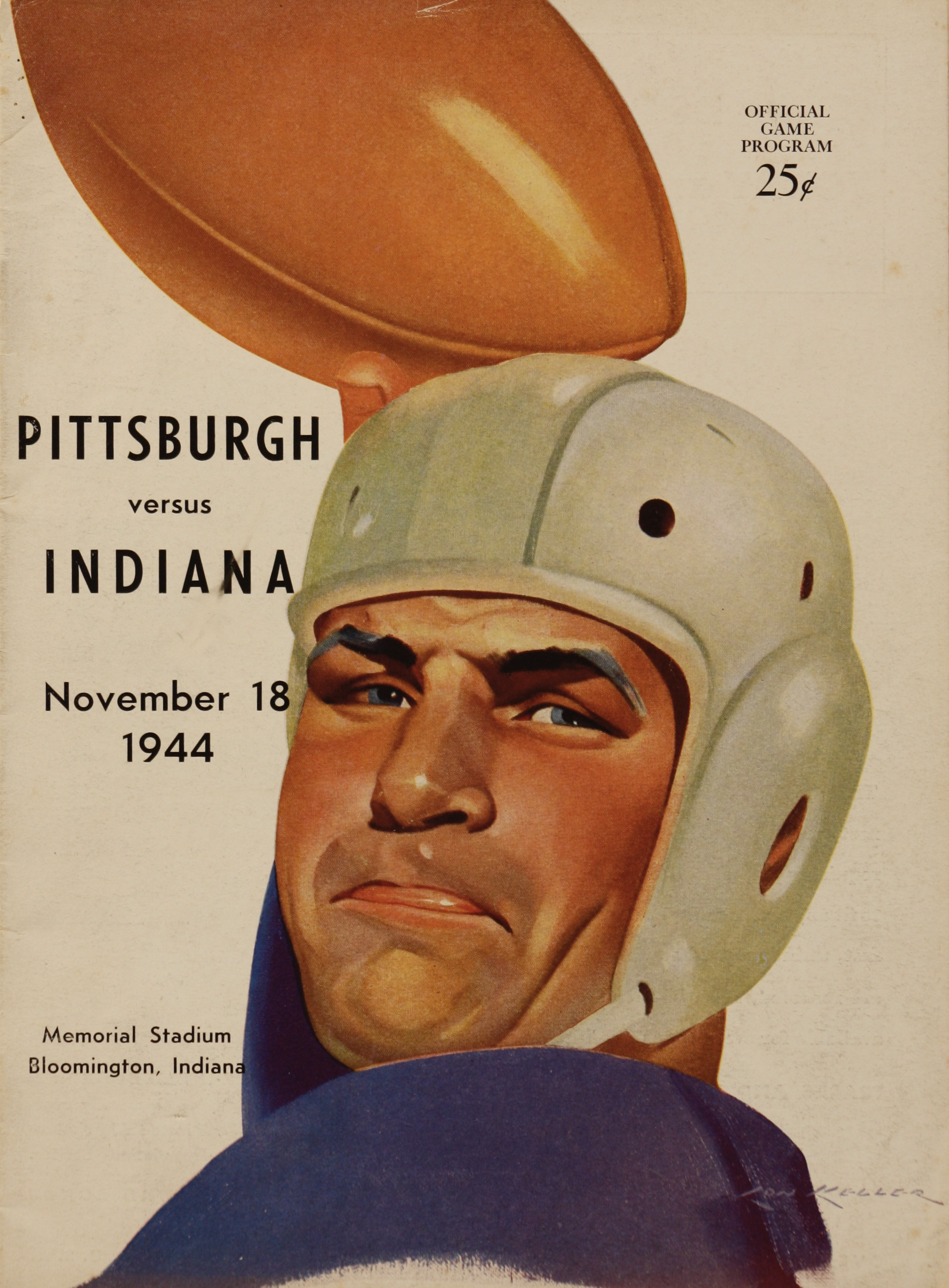
Program for November 18 game versus Indiana

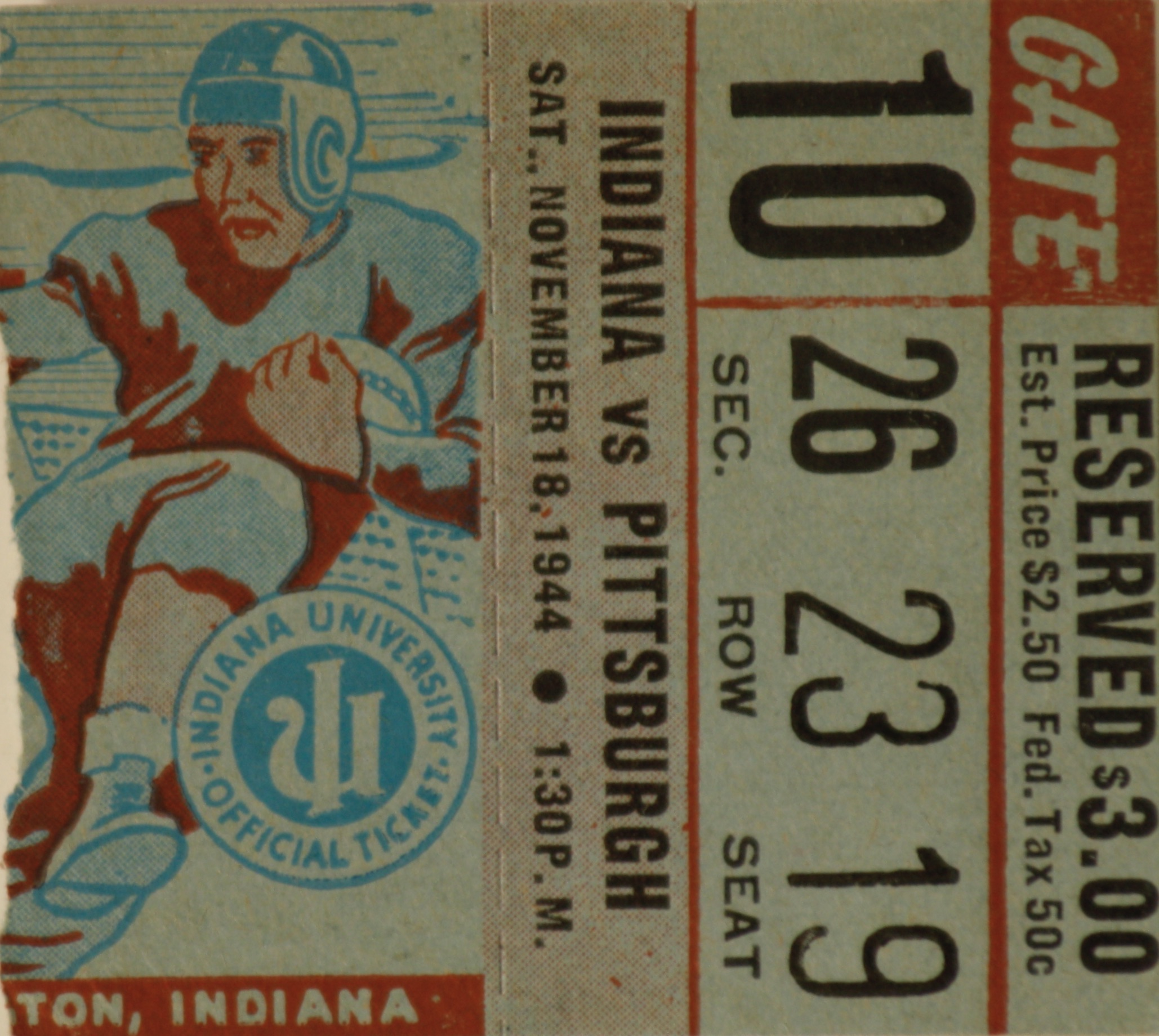
Ticket stub for November game versus Indiana

On November 18, the Panthers and the Indiana Hoosiers met for the first time in Bloomington, IN. Eleventh-year coach Bo McMillin's squad was 5–3 for the season, and had shut out their previous three home game opponents (Fort Knox 72–0, Nebraska 54–0, Iowa 32–0). Center and placekicker John Tavener was named consensus All-American. Future major league baseball star, Ted Kluszewski, started at right end.

The Hoosiers were the final Western Conference team on the Panthers schedule. In 1942, the Hoosiers defeated the Panthers in their first meeting 19–7. Coach Shaughnessey made no changes to the starting lineup and named John Lozar captain.

In front of a sparse crowd of 5,000, Indiana kept Pitt winless against the Western Conference since Sutherland's departure, and did not give up a point on their home field, as they beat the Panthers 47–0. In the first two quarters, Bob Hoernschemeyer threw three touchdown passes (two to Abe Addams and one to Richard Deranek) and scored himself on a 5-yard run around end. John Taverner converted 2 of 4 extra points and Indiana led 26–0 at halftime. The Hoosiers added two more rushing touchdowns in the third stanza. Deranek took a double pass and went 46 yards, and Mike Modak scored on a 12-yard run. In the fourth quarter, Ben Raimondi passed 16 yards to John Congdon for the final touchdown. Taverner was good on all 3 placements.

The Pitt starting lineup for the game against Indiana was Edward Zimmovan (left end), Albert Phillips (left tackle), Ralph Coleman (left guard), Loren Braner (center), George Ranii (right guard), Michael Roussos (right tackle), Robert Hawkins (right end), Paul Rickards (quarterback), George Freese (left halfback), Louis Yakopec (right halfback) and John Lozar (fullback). Substitutes appearing in the game for Pitt were Harvey Sarles, Denver Newman, John Rozanski, Joseph DeFrank, Robert Hayhurst, George Kohut, John Kosh, Donald Matthews, Bernard Sniscak and Michael Sprock.

Scoring summary

Quarter	Time	Drive			Team	Scoring information	Score	
Quarter	Time	Plays	Yards	TOP	Team	Scoring information	Pittsburgh	Indiana
1		3	8		Indiana	Richard Deranek 32-yard touchdown reception from Robert Hoernschemeyer, John Taverner kick no good	0	6
1			36		Indiana	Robert Hoernschemeyer 5-yard touchdown run, John Taverner kick good	0	13
2			75		Indiana	Abe Addams 10-yard touchdown reception from Robert Hoernschemeyer, John Taverner kick no good	0	19
2		7	63		Indiana	Abe Addams 23-yard touchdown reception from Robert Hoernschemeyer, John Taverner kick good	0	26
3					Indiana	Richard Deranek 46-yard touchdown run, John Taverner kick good	0	33
3					Indiana	Mike Moldak 12-yard touchdown run, John Taverner kick good	0	40
4					Indiana	John Congdon 16-yard touchdown reception from Ben Raimondi, John Taverner kick good	0	47
"TOP" = time of possession. For other American football terms, see Glossary of American football.							0	47

=== Penn State ===
Week 9: Penn State at Pitt

Team	1	2	3	4	Total
Penn State	0	0	0	0	0
• Pitt	0	0	14	0	14

- Date: November 25, 1944
- Location: Pitt Stadium
  Pittsburgh, PA
- Game start: 2:00 p.m.
- Game attendance: 8,840
- Game weather: chilly and wet
- Referee: Capt. F. X. Keating

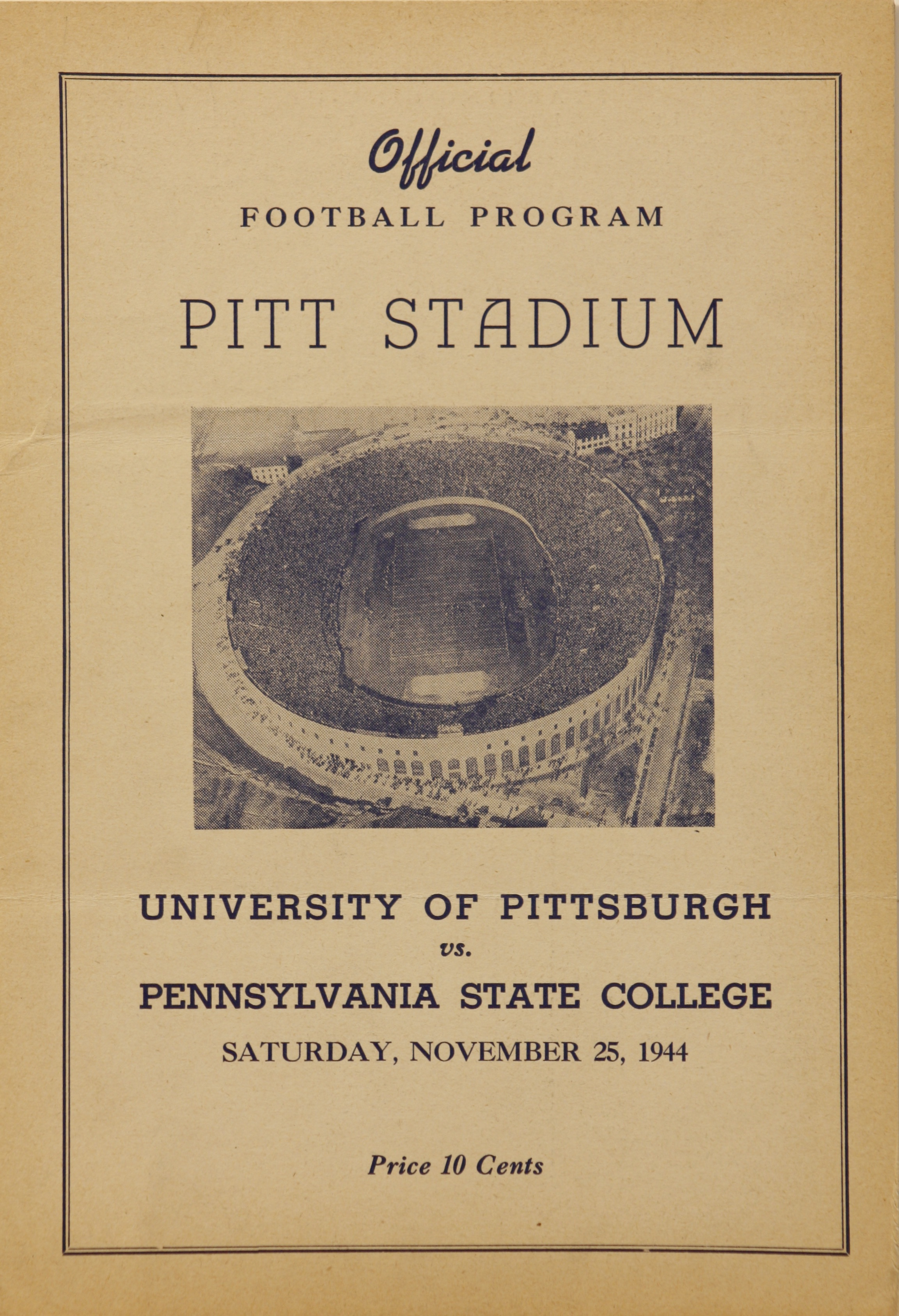
Roster sheet for November 25 game versus Penn State

On November 25, the Panthers and Nittany Lions met for the forty-fourth time. Pitt led the series 24–17–2, but Penn State had won 4 of the previous 5 games. Bob Higgins' Lions were 6–2 for the season. Their losses were to Navy (55–14) and West Virginia (28–27). Star halfback Johnny Chuckran was injured, and only saw limited action.

Coach Shaughnessey commented about his 2-year record to the Post-Gazette: "I would say that I'm a bit more puzzled than discouraged. Frankly, I thought a great university like Pitt would attract better material and maybe it will in normal times. I don't know the solution, but I'm certainly not going to walk out now just because we haven't rolled up a string of victories.....On Tuesday, despite that lacing at Indiana, the players had one of their most enthusiastic practices." Shaughnessey named center Loren Braner captain. The entire Panther squad was healthy except for halfback George Freese.

The Pitt students held a pep rally prior to the game and the Pitt Band performed for the first time all season.

The underdog Panthers ended their season on a positive note with a 14–0 upset victory over Penn State. The first half was scoreless. In the opening quarter, the Pitt offense penetrated into Lion territory twice. The first time to the 28-yard line, and then to the 21-yard line, but they turned the ball over both times on penalties. In the second period, the Pitt defense held State out of the end zone on three separate drives – twice on downs and once on an interception. Pitt substitute halfback Bernie Sniscak returned the second half kick-off 93 yards to break the scoring drought. Mike Roussos added the extra point and Pitt led 7–0. Late in the quarter, center Loren Braner intercepted Johnny Petchel's pass and returned it 30-plus yards to the State 15-yard line. On second down from the 9-yard line, Eugene Gaugler went through tackle for the Panthers second touchdown. Roussos added the placement and Pitt stunned the oddsmakers.

Pitt's Bernie Sniscak and State's John Chuckran were high school teammates on the 1943 State Champion Lansford, PA football team.

The Pitt starting lineup for the game against Penn State was Edward Zimmovan (left end), Albert Phillips (left tackle), Ralph Coleman (left guard), Loren Braner (center), George Ranii (right guard), John Rozanski (right tackle), Michael Roussos (right end), Jack Paton (quarterback), Louis Yakopec (left halfback), Donald Matthews (right halfback) and John Lozar (fullback). Substitutes appearing in the game for Pitt were Clem Schneider, Robert Hawkins, Harvey Sarles, Denver Newman, Albert Zellman, Robert Flath, Joseph DeFrank, Remo Moffa, Robert Hayhurst, Ralph Hammond, John Kosh, Eugene Gaugler, Paul Rickards, Bernard Sniscak and Michael Sprock.

Scoring summary

Quarter	Time	Drive			Team	Scoring information	Score	
Quarter	Time	Plays	Yards	TOP	Team	Scoring information	Penn State	Pittsburgh
3		1	93		Pittsburgh	Kickoff returned 93 yards for touchdown by Bernie Sniscak, Mike Roussos kick good	0	7
3		2	15		Pittsburgh	Eugene Gaugler 9-yard touchdown run, Mike Roussos kick good	0	14
"TOP" = time of possession. For other American football terms, see Glossary of American football.							0	14

== Individual scoring summary ==
1944 Pittsburgh Panthers scoring summary
Player	Touchdowns	Extra points	Field goals	Safety	Points
Tom Kalmanir	5	0	0	0	30
George Freese	3	1	0	0	19
Eugene Gaugler	3	1	0	0	19
Michael Sprock	2	0	0	0	12
Harvey Sarles	2	0	0	0	12
Don Matthews	1	0	0	0	6
Loran Braner	1	0	0	0	6
John Lozar	1	0	0	0	6
Robert Hawkins	1	0	0	0	6
Angelo Carlaccini	1	0	0	0	6
Ed Zimmovan	1	0	0	0	6
Bernard Sniscak	1	0	0	0	6
Michael Roussos	0	2	1	0	5
George Ranii	0	4	0	0	4
Albert Phillips	0	0	0	1	2
George Kohut	0	1	0	0	1
John Kosh	0	1	0	0	1
Totals	22	10	1	1	147

== Postseason ==
The Panthers finished the season with a 4–5 record. Their defense gave up 293 points, which was a record. The previous worst was 261 points given up by the 1903 team.

George Ranii was chosen to play for the East squad in the annual New Years Day Shriner's game in San Francisco.

== Team players drafted into the NFL ==
The following players were selected in the 1945 NFL draft.

Player	Position	Round	Pick	NFL club
Ralph Hammond	Center	11	109	Green Bay Packers
Frank Mattioli	Guard	14	139	Chicago Bears
Jack Itzel	Fullback	17	165	Pittsburgh Steelers
Angelo Carlaccini	Back	25	254	Pittsburgh Steelers
Loren Braner	Center	32	328	Philadelphia Eagles
