= 1944 South Carolina Gamecocks football team =

American college football season

1944 South Carolina Gamecocks football
- Conference: Southern Conference
- Record: 3–4–2 (1–3 SoCon)
- Head coach: Williams Newton (1st season)
- Captains: Jim Hunnicut; Jack Bradford
- Home stadium: Carolina Municipal Stadium

1944 Southern Conference football standings
	Conf.					Overall
Team	W		L		T	W		L		T
No. 11 Duke $	4	–	0	–	0	6	–	4	–	0
Wake Forest	6	–	1	–	0	8	–	1	–	0
Clemson	3	–	1	–	0	4	–	5	–	0
NC State	3	–	1	–	0	7	–	2	–	0
William & Mary	2	–	1	–	1	5	–	2	–	1
Maryland	1	–	1	–	0	1	–	7	–	1
South Carolina	1	–	3	–	0	3	–	4	–	2
VMI	1	–	5	–	0	1	–	8	–	0
North Carolina	0	–	3	–	1	1	–	7	–	1
Richmond	0	–	4	–	0	2	–	6	–	0
$ – Conference champion; Rankings from AP Poll

The 1944 South Carolina Gamecocks football team was an American football team that represented the University of South Carolina as a member of the Southern Conference (SoCon) during the 1944 college football season. In their first and only season under head coach Williams Newton, the Gamecocks compiled an overall record of 3–4–2 with a mark of 1–3 in conference play, placing seventh in the SoCon.

== Schedule ==
Date	Time	Opponent	Site	Result	Attendance	Source
September 23		Newberry*	Carolina Stadium; Columbia, SC	W 48–0	8,000	
September 30	3:30 p.m.	Georgia Pre-Flight*	Carolina Stadium; Columbia, SC	L 14–20		
October 7		at Miami (FL)*	Burdine Stadium; Miami, FL	T 0–0	20,000	
October 19		Clemson	State Fair Grounds; Columbia, SC (rivalry)	L 13–20	19,000	
October 27		vs. Charleston Coast Guard	County Fairgrounds; Orangeburg, SC	T 6–6	6,000	
November 4		at North Carolina	Kenan Memorial Stadium; Chapel Hill, NC (rivalry)	W 6–0		
November 11		Presbyterian*	Carolina Stadium; Columbia, SC	W 28–7		
November 18		No. 10 Duke	Carolina Stadium; Columbia, SC	L 7–34	12,000	
November 23		vs. Wake Forest	American Legion Memorial Stadium; Charlotte, NC	L 13–19	8,500	
*Non-conference game; Rankings from AP Poll released prior to the game; All times are in Eastern time
