= 1944 Sewanee Tigers football team =

American college football season

1944 Sewanee Tigers football
- Conference: Independent
- Record: 0–3–1
- Head coach: Harris Moore (1st season)
- Home stadium: Hardee Field

1944 Southern college football independents records
	Conf.			Overall
Team	W	L	T	W		L		T
Virginia		–		6	–	1	–	2
No. 4 Navy		–		6	–	3	–	0
West Virginia		–		5	–	3	–	1
Millsaps		–		3	–	6	–	0
Delaware State		–		2	–	3	–	0
Tennessee Tech		–		1	–	2	–	0
North Texas Aggies		–		2	–	6	–	0
Miami (FL)		–		1	–	7	–	1
Sewanee		–		0	–	3	–	1
Howard (AL)		–		0	–	5	–	0
Rankings from AP Poll

The 1944 Sewanee Tigers football team was an American football team that represented Sewanee: The University of the South as an independent during the 1944 college football season. For the first time since 1924 Sewanee did not lose to Vanderbilt when they tied them in the first matchup of the season.

== Schedule ==
Date	Opponent	Site	Result	Attendance	Source
October 7	Vanderbilt	Hardee Field; Sewanee, TN (rivalry)	T 0–0		
October 14	Georgia Tech "B" team	Hardee Field; Sewanee, TN	L 0–21		
November 11	at Vanderbilt	Dudley Field; Nashville, TN	L 7–28	5,000	
November 23	at Georgia Tech "B" team	Grant Field; Atlanta, GA	L 7–12		
