= 1944 Richmond Spiders football team =

American college football season

1944 Richmond Spiders football
- Conference: Southern Conference
- Record: 2–6 (0–4 SoCon)
- Head coach: Malcolm Pitt (2nd season)
- Captains: John Greer Wood; Orvis Milner
- Home stadium: City Stadium

1944 Southern Conference football standings
	Conf.					Overall
Team	W		L		T	W		L		T
No. 11 Duke $	4	–	0	–	0	6	–	4	–	0
Wake Forest	6	–	1	–	0	8	–	1	–	0
Clemson	3	–	1	–	0	4	–	5	–	0
NC State	3	–	1	–	0	7	–	2	–	0
William & Mary	2	–	1	–	1	5	–	2	–	1
Maryland	1	–	1	–	0	1	–	7	–	1
South Carolina	1	–	3	–	0	3	–	4	–	2
VMI	1	–	5	–	0	1	–	8	–	0
North Carolina	0	–	3	–	1	1	–	7	–	1
Richmond	0	–	4	–	0	2	–	6	–	0
$ – Conference champion; Rankings from AP Poll

The 1944 Richmond Spiders football team was an American football team that represented the University of Richmond as a member of the Southern Conference (SoCon) during the 1944 college football season. In their second season under head coach Malcolm Pitt, Richmond compiled a 2–6 record, with a mark of 0–4 in conference play, finishing in tenth place in the SoCon.

== Schedule ==
Date	Time	Opponent	Site	Result	Attendance	Source
September 23		at Duke	Duke Stadium; Durham, NC	L 7–61	8,250	
September 30	8:15 p.m.	Richmond AAB*	City Stadium; Richmond, VA	W 34–0		
October 7		VMI	City Stadium; Richmond, VA (rivalry)	L 20–26	4,500	
October 14		Hampden–Sydney*	City Stadium; Richmond, VA	W 18–0		
November 4		Norfolk Fleet*	City Stadium; Richmond, VA	L 0–19		
November 11		Virginia*	City Stadium; Richmond, VA	L 0–39	4,000	
November 18		at NC State	Riddick Stadium; Raleigh, NC	L 0–39		
November 30		William & Mary	City Stadium; Richmond, VA (rivalry)	L 0–40	5,000	
*Non-conference game; All times are in Eastern time
