= 1944 Clemson Tigers football team =

American college football season

1944 Clemson Tigers football
- Conference: Southern Conference
- Record: 4–5 (3–1 SoCon)
- Head coach: Frank Howard (5th season)
- Captain: Ralph Jenkins
- Home stadium: Memorial Stadium

1944 Southern Conference football standings
	Conf.					Overall
Team	W		L		T	W		L		T
No. 11 Duke $	4	–	0	–	0	6	–	4	–	0
Wake Forest	6	–	1	–	0	8	–	1	–	0
Clemson	3	–	1	–	0	4	–	5	–	0
NC State	3	–	1	–	0	7	–	2	–	0
William & Mary	2	–	1	–	1	5	–	2	–	1
Maryland	1	–	1	–	0	1	–	7	–	1
South Carolina	1	–	3	–	0	3	–	4	–	2
VMI	1	–	5	–	0	1	–	8	–	0
North Carolina	0	–	3	–	1	1	–	7	–	1
Richmond	0	–	4	–	0	2	–	6	–	0
$ – Conference champion; Rankings from AP Poll

The 1944 Clemson Tigers football team was an American football that represented Clemson College as a member of the Southern Conference during the 1944 college football season. In their fifth season under head coach Frank Howard, the Tigers compiled a 4–5 record (3–1 against conference opponents), finished seventh in the conference, and were outscored by a total of 179 to 165. The team played its home games at Memorial Stadium in Clemson, South Carolina.

Center Ralph Jenkins was the team captain for the second consecutive year. He was also selected as a first-team player on the 1944 All-Southern Conference football team. The team's statistical leaders included tailback Sid Tinsley with 248 passing yards and 479 rushing yards and fullback Billy G. Rogers with 37 points scored (6 touchdowns and 1 extra point).

Six Clemson players were selected on the 1944 All-South Carolina football team: tackles Harley Phillips and Phil Prince; guard Tom Salisbury; center Ralph Jenkins; and backs Sid Tinsley and Billy G. Rogers.

== Schedule ==
Date	Opponent	Site	Result	Attendance	Source
September 23	Presbyterian*	Memorial Stadium; Clemson, SC	W 34–0	5,000	
September 30	at Georgia Tech*	Grant Field; Atlanta, GA (rivalry)	L 0–51	15,000	
October 7	vs. NC State	American Legion Memorial Stadium; Charlotte, NC (rivalry)	W 13–7	5,000	
October 19	at South Carolina	State Fair Grounds; Columbia, SC (rivalry)	W 20–13	19,000	
October 28	at No. 20 Tennessee	Shields–Watkins Field; Knoxville, TN	L 7–26	11,000	
November 4	at No. 17 Wake Forest	Groves Stadium; Wake Forest, NC	L 7–13	4,000	
November 11	VMI	Memorial Stadium; Clemson, SC	W 57–12	7,500	
November 18	at Tulane*	Tulane Stadium; New Orleans, LA	L 20–36	10,000	
November 24	at Georgia*	Sanford Stadium; Athens, GA (rivalry)	L 7–21	3,500	
*Non-conference game; Rankings from AP Poll released prior to the game
