= 1944 Virginia Cavaliers football team =

American college football season

1944 Virginia Cavaliers football
- Conference: Independent
- Record: 6–1–2
- Head coach: Frank Murray (8th season)
- Captain: James Fahey
- Home stadium: Scott Stadium

1944 Southern college football independents records
	Conf.			Overall
Team	W	L	T	W		L		T
Virginia		–		6	–	1	–	2
No. 4 Navy		–		6	–	3	–	0
West Virginia		–		5	–	3	–	1
Millsaps		–		3	–	6	–	0
Delaware State		–		2	–	3	–	0
Tennessee Tech		–		1	–	2	–	0
North Texas Aggies		–		2	–	6	–	0
Miami (FL)		–		1	–	7	–	1
Sewanee		–		0	–	3	–	1
Howard (AL)		–		0	–	5	–	0
Rankings from AP Poll

The 1944 Virginia Cavaliers football team represented the University of Virginia during the 1944 college football season. The Cavaliers were led by eighth-year head coach Frank Murray and played their home games at Scott Stadium in Charlottesville, Virginia. They competed as independents, finishing with a record of 6–1–2.

== Schedule ==
Date	Opponent	Site	Result	Attendance	Source
September 23	Hampden–Sydney	Scott Stadium; Charlottesville, VA	W 37–0		
September 30	vs. NC State	Foreman Field; Norfolk, VA	L 0–13		
October 7	vs. West Virginia	Laidley Field; Charleston, WV	W 24–6		
October 14	North Carolina Pre-Flight	Scott Stadium; Charlottesville, VA	T 13–13	9,000	
October 28	vs. VMI	City Stadium; Lynchburg, VA	W 34–0		
November 4	vs. Maryland	Griffith Stadium; Washington, DC (rivalry)	W 18–7	8,000	
November 11	at Richmond	City Stadium; Richmond, VA	W 39–0	4,000	
November 25	at Yale	Yale Bowl; New Haven, CT	T 6–6	18,000	
December 2	vs. North Carolina	Foreman Field; Norfolk, VA (South's Oldest Rivalry)	W 26–7	8,000	
