= 1944 West Virginia Mountaineers football team =

American college football season

1944 West Virginia Mountaineers football
- Conference: Independent
- Record: 5–3–1
- Head coach: Ira Rodgers (8th season)
- Captain: Russell Lopez
- Home stadium: Mountaineer Field

1944 Southern college football independents records
	Conf.			Overall
Team	W	L	T	W		L		T
Virginia		–		6	–	1	–	2
No. 4 Navy		–		6	–	3	–	0
West Virginia		–		5	–	3	–	1
Millsaps		–		3	–	6	–	0
Delaware State		–		2	–	3	–	0
Tennessee Tech		–		1	–	2	–	0
North Texas Aggies		–		2	–	6	–	0
Miami (FL)		–		1	–	7	–	1
Sewanee		–		0	–	3	–	1
Howard (AL)		–		0	–	5	–	0
Rankings from AP Poll

The 1944 West Virginia Mountaineers football team was an American football team that represented West Virginia University as an independent during the 1944 college football season. In its eighth season under head coach Ira Rodgers, the team compiled a 5–3–1 record and outscored opponents by a total of 191 to 130. The team played its home games at Mountaineer Field in Morgantown, West Virginia. Russell Lopez was the team captain.

== Schedule ==
Date	Opponent	Site	Result	Attendance	Source
September 23	at Pittsburgh	Pitt Stadium; Pittsburgh, PA (rivalry)	L 13–26	10,000	
September 30	Case	Mountaineer Field; Morgantown, WV	W 32–7	5,000	
October 7	vs. Virginia	Laidley Field; Charleston, WV	L 6–24		
October 14	at Maryland	Byrd Stadium; College Park, MD (rivalry)	T 6–6	5,600	
October 21	Bethany (WV)	Mountaineer Field; Morgantown, WV	W 20–0	3,000	
October 28	at Penn State	New Beaver Field; State College, PA (rivalry)	W 28–27	5,534	
November 4	Temple^{†}	Mountaineer Field; Morgantown, WV	W 6–0	6,000	
November 11	Lehigh	Mountaineer Field; Morgantown, WV	W 71–0		
November 18	at Kentucky	McLean Stadium; Lexington, KY	L 9–40		
^{†}Homecoming
