= 1944 Maryland Terrapins football team =

American college football season

1944 Maryland Terrapins football
- Conference: Southern Conference
- Record: 1–7–1 (1–1 SoCon)
- Head coach: Clarence Spears (2nd season)
- Home stadium: Byrd Stadium (original)

1944 Southern Conference football standings
	Conf.					Overall
Team	W		L		T	W		L		T
No. 11 Duke $	4	–	0	–	0	6	–	4	–	0
Wake Forest	6	–	1	–	0	8	–	1	–	0
Clemson	3	–	1	–	0	4	–	5	–	0
NC State	3	–	1	–	0	7	–	2	–	0
William & Mary	2	–	1	–	1	5	–	2	–	1
Maryland	1	–	1	–	0	1	–	7	–	1
South Carolina	1	–	3	–	0	3	–	4	–	2
VMI	1	–	5	–	0	1	–	8	–	0
North Carolina	0	–	3	–	1	1	–	7	–	1
Richmond	0	–	4	–	0	2	–	6	–	0
$ – Conference champion; Rankings from AP Poll

The 1944 Maryland Terrapins football team represented the University of Maryland in the 1944 college football season. In their second season under head coach Clarence Spears, the Terrapins compiled a 1–7–1 record (1–1 in conference), finished in sixth place in the Southern Conference, and were outscored by their opponents 170 to 46.

== Schedule ==
Date	Opponent	Site	Result	Attendance	Source
September 29	Hampden–Sydney*	Byrd Stadium; College Park, MD	L 0–12	2,500	
October 7	at Wake Forest	Groves Stadium; Wake Forest, NC	L 0–39	2,000	
October 14	West Virginia*	Byrd Stadium; College Park, MD (rivalry)	T 6–6	5,600	
October 21	Michigan State*	Byrd Stadium; College Park, MD	L 0–8	500	
October 28	at Florida*	Florida Field; Gainesville, FL	L 6–14	7,000	
November 4	vs. Virginia*	Griffith Stadium; Washington, DC (rivalry)	L 7–18	8,000	
November 11	at Michigan State*	Macklin Field; East Lansing, MI	L 0–33	8,160	
November 18	at Penn State*	New Beaver Field; State College, PA (rivalry)	L 19–34		
November 30	vs. VMI	Victory Stadium; Roanoke, VA	W 8–6	4,000	
*Non-conference game
