= 1944 William & Mary Indians football team =

American college football season

1944 William & Mary Indians football
- Conference: Southern Conference
- Record: 5–2–1 (2–1–1 SoCon)
- Head coach: Rube McCray (1st season)
- Captain: Johnny Clowes
- Home stadium: Cary Field

1944 Southern Conference football standings
	Conf.					Overall
Team	W		L		T	W		L		T
No. 11 Duke $	4	–	0	–	0	6	–	4	–	0
Wake Forest	6	–	1	–	0	8	–	1	–	0
Clemson	3	–	1	–	0	4	–	5	–	0
NC State	3	–	1	–	0	7	–	2	–	0
William & Mary	2	–	1	–	1	5	–	2	–	1
Maryland	1	–	1	–	0	1	–	7	–	1
South Carolina	1	–	3	–	0	3	–	4	–	2
VMI	1	–	5	–	0	1	–	8	–	0
North Carolina	0	–	3	–	1	1	–	7	–	1
Richmond	0	–	4	–	0	2	–	6	–	0
$ – Conference champion; Rankings from AP Poll

The 1944 William & Mary Indians football team represented the College of William & Mary as a member of the Southern Conference (SoCon) during the 1944 college football season. Led by first-year head coach Rube McCray, the Indians compiled an overall record of 5–2–1 with a mark of 2–1–1 in conference play, placing fifth in the SoCon.

== Schedule ==
Date	Time	Opponent	Site	Result	Attendance	Source
September 30		Fort Monroe*	Cary Field; Williamsburg, VA	W 46–0	1,800	
October 6		vs. Hampden–Sydney*	City Stadium; Richmond, VA	W 38–0		
October 14		at No. 9 Penn*	Franklin Field; Philadelphia, PA	L 0–46	32,000	
October 21	2:30 p.m.	Richmond AAB*	Cary Field; Williamsburg, VA	W 39–0	3,000	
October 28	2:30 p.m.	vs. NC State	Foreman Field; Norfolk, VA	L 2–19	12,500	
November 11		at North Carolina	Kenan Memorial Stadium; Chapel Hill, NC	T 0–0	3,000	
November 18	2:30 p.m.	vs. VMI	Portsmouth Stadium; Portsmouth, VA (rivalry)	W 26–0	5,000	
November 30		at Richmond	City Stadium; Richmond, VA (rivalry)	W 40–0	5,000	
*Non-conference game; Rankings from AP Poll released prior to the game; All times are in Eastern time

== NFL draft selections ==
= Pro Football Hall of Fame	= Canadian Football Hall of Fame	= College Football Hall of Fame

NFL Draft Selections

#	Year	Round	Pick	Overall	Name	Team	Position
8	1945	25	4	256	Bill Iancelli	Boston Yanks	End
9	1945	29	8	304	Nick Forkovitch	Chicago Bears	Back
