= 1944 Duke Blue Devils football team =

American college football season

1944 Duke Blue Devils football

SoCon champion Sugar Bowl champion

Sugar Bowl, W 29–26 vs. Alabama
- Conference: Southern Conference

Ranking
- AP: No. 11
- Record: 6–4 (4–0 SoCon)
- Head coach: Eddie Cameron (3rd season)
- MVP: Tom Davis
- Captain: Gordon Carver
- Home stadium: Duke Stadium

1944 Southern Conference football standings
	Conf.					Overall
Team	W		L		T	W		L		T
No. 11 Duke $	4	–	0	–	0	6	–	4	–	0
Wake Forest	6	–	1	–	0	8	–	1	–	0
Clemson	3	–	1	–	0	4	–	5	–	0
NC State	3	–	1	–	0	7	–	2	–	0
William & Mary	2	–	1	–	1	5	–	2	–	1
Maryland	1	–	1	–	0	1	–	7	–	1
South Carolina	1	–	3	–	0	3	–	4	–	2
VMI	1	–	5	–	0	1	–	8	–	0
North Carolina	0	–	3	–	1	1	–	7	–	1
Richmond	0	–	4	–	0	2	–	6	–	0
$ – Conference champion; Rankings from AP Poll

The 1944 Duke Blue Devils football team was an American football team that represented Duke University as a member of the Southern Conference during the 1944 college football season. In its third season under head coach Eddie Cameron, the team compiled a 6–4 record (4–0 against conference opponents), won the conference championship, was ranked No. 11 in the final AP Poll, and defeated Alabama in the 1945 Sugar Bowl on New Year's Day. The Blue Devils outscored opponents by a total of 230 to 118.

== Schedule ==
Date	Opponent	Rank	Site	Result	Attendance	Source
September 23	Richmond		Duke Stadium; Durham, NC	W 61–7	8,250	
September 30	at Penn*		Franklin Field; Philadelphia, PA	L 7–18	40,000	
October 7	North Carolina Pre-Flight*		Duke Stadium; Durham, NC	L 6–13	19,000	
October 14	vs. No. 6 Navy*		Municipal Stadium; Baltimore, MD	L 0–7	25,000	
October 28	vs. No. 2 Army*		Polo Grounds; New York, NY	L 7–27	45,000	
November 4	No. 5 Georgia Tech*^{†}		Duke Stadium; Durham, NC	W 19–13	30,000	
November 11	No. 12 Wake Forest	No. 20	Duke Stadium; Durham, NC	W 34–0	35,000	
November 18	at South Carolina	No. 10	Carolina Stadium; Columbia, SC	W 34–7	12,000	
November 25	at North Carolina	No. 11	Kenan Memorial Stadium; Chapel Hill, NC (rivalry)	W 33–0	25,000	
January 1, 1945	vs. No. 16 Alabama*	No. 11	Tulane Stadium; New Orleans, LA (Sugar Bowl)	W 29–26	66,822	
*Non-conference game; ^{†}Homecoming; Rankings from AP Poll released prior to the game

== Rankings ==
Ranking movements Legend: ██ Increase in ranking ██ Decrease in ranking — = Not ranked ( ) = First-place votes
	Week								
Poll	1	2	3	4	5	6	7	8	Final
AP	—	—	—	—	20	10	11 (1)	11	11
