= 1944 VMI Keydets football team =

American college football season

1944 VMI Keydets football
- Conference: Southern Conference
- Record: 1–8 (1–5 SoCon)
- Head coach: Pooley Hubert (8th season)
- Home stadium: Alumni Field

1944 Southern Conference football standings
	Conf.					Overall
Team	W		L		T	W		L		T
No. 11 Duke $	4	–	0	–	0	6	–	4	–	0
Wake Forest	6	–	1	–	0	8	–	1	–	0
Clemson	3	–	1	–	0	4	–	5	–	0
NC State	3	–	1	–	0	7	–	2	–	0
William & Mary	2	–	1	–	1	5	–	2	–	1
Maryland	1	–	1	–	0	1	–	7	–	1
South Carolina	1	–	3	–	0	3	–	4	–	2
VMI	1	–	5	–	0	1	–	8	–	0
North Carolina	0	–	3	–	1	1	–	7	–	1
Richmond	0	–	4	–	0	2	–	6	–	0
$ – Conference champion; Rankings from AP Poll

The 1944 VMI Keydets football team was an American football team that represented the Virginia Military Institute (VMI) during the 1944 college football season as a member of the Southern Conference. In their eighth year under head coach Pooley Hubert, the team compiled an overall record of 1–8.

== Schedule ==
Date	Opponent	Site	Result	Attendance	Source
September 30	Catawba*	Alumni Field; Lexington, VA	L 6–7	2,000	
October 7	at Richmond	City Stadium; Richmond, VA (rivalry)	W 26–20	4,500	
October 14	vs. No. 17 Wake Forest	World War Memorial Stadium; Greensboro, NC	L 7–38	9,000	
October 20	at Kentucky*	McLean Stadium; Lexington, KY	L 2–26	8,000	
October 28	vs. Virginia*	City Stadium; Lynchburg, VA	L 0–34		
November 4	NC State	Alumni Field; Lexington, VA	L 6–21		
November 11	at Clemson	Memorial Stadium; Clemson, SC	L 12–57	7,500	
November 18	vs. William & Mary	Portsmouth Stadium; Portsmouth, VA (rivalry)	L 0–26	5,000	
November 30	vs. Maryland	Victory Stadium; Roanoke, VA	L 6–8	4,000	
*Non-conference game; Rankings from AP Poll released prior to the game
