= 1944 Wake Forest Demon Deacons football team =

American college football season

1944 Wake Forest Demon Deacons football
- Conference: Southern Conference
- Record: 8–1 (6–1 SoCon)
- Head coach: Peahead Walker (8th season)
- Captain: Elmer Barbour
- Home stadium: Groves Stadium

1944 Southern Conference football standings
	Conf.					Overall
Team	W		L		T	W		L		T
No. 11 Duke $	4	–	0	–	0	6	–	4	–	0
Wake Forest	6	–	1	–	0	8	–	1	–	0
Clemson	3	–	1	–	0	4	–	5	–	0
NC State	3	–	1	–	0	7	–	2	–	0
William & Mary	2	–	1	–	1	5	–	2	–	1
Maryland	1	–	1	–	0	1	–	7	–	1
South Carolina	1	–	3	–	0	3	–	4	–	2
VMI	1	–	5	–	0	1	–	8	–	0
North Carolina	0	–	3	–	1	1	–	7	–	1
Richmond	0	–	4	–	0	2	–	6	–	0
$ – Conference champion; Rankings from AP Poll

The 1944 Wake Forest Demon Deacons football team was an American football team that represented Wake Forest University during the 1944 college football season. In its eighth season under head coach Peahead Walker, the team compiled an 8–1 record and finished in second place in the Southern Conference.

== Schedule ==
Date	Opponent	Rank	Site	Result	Attendance	Source
September 23	at North Carolina		Kenan Memorial Stadium; Chapel Hill, NC (rivalry)	W 7–0	13,000	
September 29	at Georgia*		Sanford Stadium; Athens, GA	W 14–7	8,500	
October 7	Maryland		Groves Stadium; Wake Forest, NC	W 39–0	2,000	
October 14	vs. VMI	No. 17	World War Memorial Stadium; Greensboro, NC	W 38–7	9,000	
October 21	at NC State		Riddick Stadium; Raleigh, NC (rivalry)	W 21–7	8,000–11,000	
October 27	at Miami (FL)*	No. 18	Burdine Stadium; Miami, FL	W 27–0	18,232	
November 4	Clemson^{†}	No. 17	Groves Stadium; Wake Forest, NC	W 13–7	4,000	
November 11	at No. 20 Duke	No. 12	Duke Stadium; Durham, NC (rivalry)	L 0–34	35,000	
November 23	vs. South Carolina		American Legion Memorial Stadium; Charlotte, NC	W 19–13	8,500	
*Non-conference game; ^{†}Homecoming; Rankings from AP Poll released prior to the game

== Rankings ==
Ranking movements Legend: ██ Increase in ranking ██ Decrease in ranking — = Not ranked ( ) = First-place votes
	Week								
Poll	1	2	3	4	5	6	7	8	Final
AP	17	—	18	17	12 (1)	—	—	—	—
