= 1944 Miami Hurricanes football team =

American college football season

1944 Miami Hurricanes football
- Conference: Independent
- Record: 1–7–1
- Head coach: Eddie Dunn (2nd season)
- Home stadium: Burdine Stadium

1944 Southern college football independents records
	Conf.			Overall
Team	W	L	T	W		L		T
Virginia		–		6	–	1	–	2
No. 4 Navy		–		6	–	3	–	0
West Virginia		–		5	–	3	–	1
Millsaps		–		3	–	6	–	0
Delaware State		–		2	–	3	–	0
Tennessee Tech		–		1	–	2	–	0
North Texas Aggies		–		2	–	6	–	0
Miami (FL)		–		1	–	7	–	1
Sewanee		–		0	–	3	–	1
Howard (AL)		–		0	–	5	–	0
Rankings from AP Poll

The 1944 Miami Hurricanes football team represented the University of Miami as an independent during the 1944 college football season. The Hurricanes played their home games at Burdine Stadium in Miami, Florida. The team was coached by Eddie Dunn, in his second and final year as interim head coach, while active head coach Jack Harding served in World War II.

== Schedule ==
Date	Opponent	Site	Result	Attendance	Source
October 7	South Carolina	Burdine Stadium; Miami, FL	T 0–0	20,000	
October 20	Fort Pierce	Burdine Stadium; Miami, FL	L 0–38	13,959	
October 27	No. 18 Wake Forest	Burdine Stadium; Miami, FL	L 0–27	18,232	
November 3	Florida	Burdine Stadium; Miami, FL (rivalry)	L 0–13	16,415	
November 10	NC State	Burdine Stadium; Miami, FL	L 7–28	12,412	
November 17	Presbyterian	Burdine Stadium; Miami, FL	W 33–13		
November 24	Auburn	Burdine Stadium; Miami, FL	L 19–38	13,000	
December 1	Tulsa	Burdine Stadium; Miami, FL	L 2–48	11,234	
December 8	Texas A&M	Burdine Stadium; Miami, FL	L 14–70	10,000	
Rankings from AP Poll released prior to the game
