= 1944 NC State Wolfpack football team =

American college football season

1944 NC State Wolfpack football
- Conference: Southern Conference
- Record: 7–2 (3–2 SoCon)
- Head coach: Beattie Feathers (1st season)
- Home stadium: Riddick Stadium

1944 Southern Conference football standings
	Conf.					Overall
Team	W		L		T	W		L		T
No. 11 Duke $	4	–	0	–	0	6	–	4	–	0
Wake Forest	6	–	1	–	0	8	–	1	–	0
Clemson	3	–	1	–	0	4	–	5	–	0
NC State	3	–	1	–	0	7	–	2	–	0
William & Mary	2	–	1	–	1	5	–	2	–	1
Maryland	1	–	1	–	0	1	–	7	–	1
South Carolina	1	–	3	–	0	3	–	4	–	2
VMI	1	–	5	–	0	1	–	8	–	0
North Carolina	0	–	3	–	1	1	–	7	–	1
Richmond	0	–	4	–	0	2	–	6	–	0
$ – Conference champion; Rankings from AP Poll

The 1944 NC State Wolfpack football team was an American football team that represented North Carolina State University as a member of the Southern Conference (SoCon) during the 1944 college football season. In its first season under head coach Beattie Feathers, the team compiled a 7–2 record (3–2 against SoCon opponents) and outscored opponents by a total of 173 to 63.

== Schedule ==
Date	Opponent	Site	Result	Attendance	Source
September 23	Milligan*	Riddick Stadium; Raleigh, NC	W 27–7	4,500	
September 30	vs. Virginia*	Foreman Field; Norfolk, VA	W 13–0		
October 7	vs. Clemson	American Legion Memorial Stadium; Charlotte, NC (rivalry)	L 7–13	5,000	
October 14	Catawba*	Riddick Stadium; Raleigh, NC	W 12–7		
October 21	Wake Forest	Riddick Stadium; Raleigh, NC (rivalry)	L 7–21	8,000–11,000	
October 28	vs. William & Mary	Foreman Field; Norfolk, VA	W 19–2	12,500	
November 4	at VMI	Alumni Field; Lexington, VA	W 21–6		
November 10	at Miami (FL)*	Burdine Stadium; Miami, FL	W 28–7	12,412	
November 18	Richmond^{†}	Riddick Stadium; Raleigh, NC	W 39–0		
*Non-conference game; ^{†}Homecoming
