= 1944 Navy Midshipmen football team =

American college football season

1944 Navy Midshipmen football
- Conference: Independent

Ranking
- AP: No. 4
- Record: 6–3
- Head coach: Oscar Hagberg (1st season)
- Captain: Ben Chase
- Home stadium: Thompson Stadium

1944 Southern college football independents records
	Conf.			Overall
Team	W	L	T	W		L		T
Virginia		–		6	–	1	–	2
No. 4 Navy		–		6	–	3	–	0
West Virginia		–		5	–	3	–	1
Millsaps		–		3	–	6	–	0
Delaware State		–		2	–	3	–	0
Tennessee Tech		–		1	–	2	–	0
North Texas Aggies		–		2	–	6	–	0
Miami (FL)		–		1	–	7	–	1
Sewanee		–		0	–	3	–	1
Howard (AL)		–		0	–	5	–	0
Rankings from AP Poll

The 1944 Navy Midshipmen football team represented the United States Naval Academy during the 1944 college football season. In their first season under head coach Oscar Hagberg, the Midshipmen compiled a 6–3 record, shut out three opponents and outscored all opponents by a combined score of 236 to 88. Navy was ranked No. 4 in the final AP poll.

== Schedule ==
Date	Time	Opponent	Rank	Site	Result	Attendance	Source
September 30	2:30 p.m.	North Carolina Pre-Flight		Thompson Stadium; Annapolis, MD	L 14–21		
October 7		Penn State		Thompson Stadium; Annapolis, MD	W 55–14		
October 14		Duke	No. 6	Municipal Stadium; Baltimore, MD	W 7–0	25,000	
October 21		at No. 8 Georgia Tech	No. 9	Grant Field; Atlanta, GA	L 15–17	35,000	
October 28		at No. 7 Penn	No. 12	Franklin Field; Philadelphia, PA	W 26–0	73,000	
November 4		No. 2 Notre Dame	No. 6	Municipal Stadium; Baltimore, MD (rivalry)	W 32–13	60,938	
November 11		Cornell	No. 3	Municipal Stadium; Baltimore, MD	W 48–0	25,000	
November 18		No. 14 Purdue	No. 3	Municipal Stadium; Baltimore, MD	W 32–0	35,000	
December 2		vs. No. 1 Army	No. 2	Municipal Stadium; Baltimore, MD (Army–Navy Game)	L 7–23	70,000	
Rankings from AP Poll released prior to the game; All times are in Eastern time

== Rankings ==
Ranking movements Legend: ██ Increase in ranking ██ Decrease in ranking ( ) = First-place votes
	Week								
Poll	1	2	3	4	5	6	7	8	Final
AP	6	9	12	6 (1)	3 (1)	3 (5)	2 (5)	2 (1)	4
