= 1944 North Carolina Tar Heels football team =

American college football season

1944 North Carolina Tar Heels football
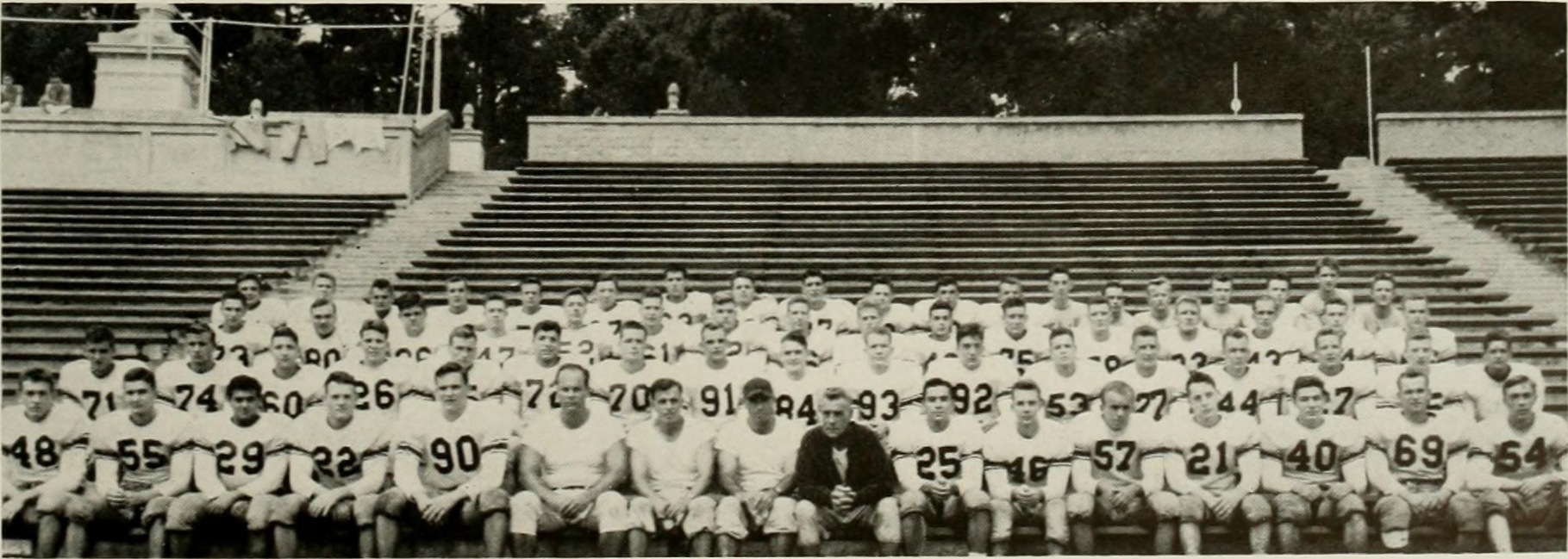
- Conference: Southern Conference
- Record: 1–7–1 (0–3–1 SoCon)
- Head coach: Gene McEver
- Captain: Bobby Weant
- Home stadium: Kenan Memorial Stadium

1944 Southern Conference football standings
	Conf.					Overall
Team	W		L		T	W		L		T
No. 11 Duke $	4	–	0	–	0	6	–	4	–	0
Wake Forest	6	–	1	–	0	8	–	1	–	0
Clemson	3	–	1	–	0	4	–	5	–	0
NC State	3	–	1	–	0	7	–	2	–	0
William & Mary	2	–	1	–	1	5	–	2	–	1
Maryland	1	–	1	–	0	1	–	7	–	1
South Carolina	1	–	3	–	0	3	–	4	–	2
VMI	1	–	5	–	0	1	–	8	–	0
North Carolina	0	–	3	–	1	1	–	7	–	1
Richmond	0	–	4	–	0	2	–	6	–	0
$ – Conference champion; Rankings from AP Poll

The 1944 North Carolina Tar Heels football team represented the University of North Carolina at Chapel Hill during the 1944 college football season. The Tar Heels were led by first-year head coach Gene McEver and played their home games at Kenan Memorial Stadium. They competed as a member of the Southern Conference.

== Schedule ==
Date	Time	Opponent	Site	Result	Attendance	Source
September 23	3:00 p.m.	Wake Forest	Kenan Memorial Stadium; Chapel Hill, NC (rivalry)	L 0–7	13,000	
September 30	2:45 p.m.	at Army*	Michie Stadium; West Point, NY	L 0–46	7,000	
October 7	3:00 p.m.	at Georgia Tech*	Grant Field; Atlanta, GA	L 0–28	15,000	
October 14	3:00 p.m.	Cherry Point Marines*	Kenan Memorial Stadium; Chapel Hill, NC	W 20–14	7,500	
November 4	2:30 p.m.	South Carolina	Kenan Memorial Stadium; Chapel Hill, NC (rivalry)	L 0–6		
November 11	2:30 p.m.	William & Mary	Kenan Memorial Stadium; Chapel Hill, NC	T 0–0	3,000	
November 18	2:30 p.m.	at No. 20 Yale*	Yale Bowl; New Haven, CT	L 6–13	10,000	
November 25	2:00 p.m.	No. 11 Duke	Kenan Memorial Stadium; Chapel Hill, NC (rivalry)	L 0–33	25,000	
December 2	2:30 p.m.	vs. Virginia*	Foreman Field; Norfolk, VA (South's Oldest Rivalry)	L 7–26	8,000	
*Non-conference game; Rankings from AP Poll released prior to the game; All times are in Eastern time
