= List of Marquette University alumni =

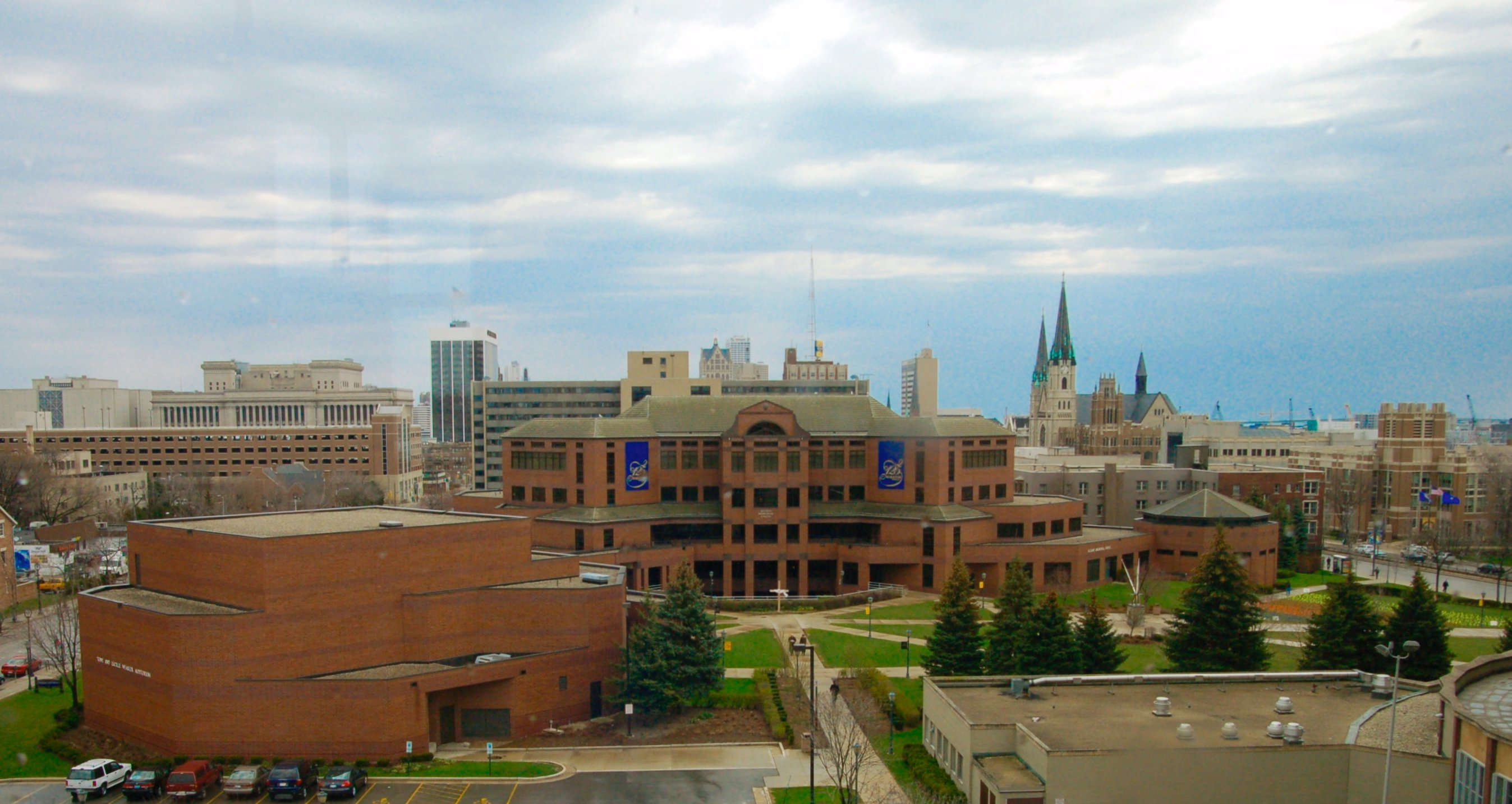
Marquette University alumni include graduates, non-graduate former students, and current students.

The list of Marquette University alumni includes graduates, non-graduate former students, and current students of Marquette University (MU) and Marquette University Law School (MULS), both located in Milwaukee, Wisconsin.

== Arts and media ==
Name	Class year	Notability	References
Marc Alaimo		Actor (Star Trek: Deep Space Nine)	
Don Ameche	1929	Academy Award-winning actor	
Tab Baker		Actor	
Shauna Singh Baldwin	1983	Author	
Jack Berry	attended 1949 to 1951	Sports journalist with The Detroit News, the Detroit Free Press, United Press International, and the Golf Writers' Association of America	
Kamla Bhatt		Indian podcaster	
Joan Biskupic	1978	USA Today correspondent, U.S. Supreme Court biographer	
Peter Bonerz	1960	TV and film actor and director, best known for The Bob Newhart Show	
Ann Brill	1985	Dean of the School of Journalism at the University of Kansas	
Margaret Coel	1960	Author of Father John/Wind River mystery series	
Gail Collins	1976	Author and New York Times columnist	
Babs Costello		Social media influencer	
Anthony Crivello	1978	Tony Award-winning actor and screenwriter	
Mark Curtis	1981	TV journalist, author and political analyst	
Nicholas D'Agosto	2002	Actor	
Pat Donohue		Acoustic guitarist, mainstay of Garrison Keillor's A Prairie Home Companion radio program with house band	
Alexander C. Eschweiler	N/A	Architect	
Chris Farley	1986	Actor, comedian and Saturday Night Live cast member; wore his Marquette Rugby jacket during a college scene in Tommy Boy	
Kevin Farley	1998	Actor and comedian; brother of Chris Farley	
Pat Finn	1987	Actor	
Michael F. Flynn	1971	Science-fiction writer, author of In the Country of the Blind	
James Foley	1996	Freelance journalist who was decapitated by ISIS (ISIL) in Syria in 2014	
Jeff German		Las Vegas journalist who was murdered in 2022	
Charles Harbutt	1956	Photographer	
Dan Harmon		Creator of Community	
Astead Herndon		Journalist	
John M. Higgins	1984	Reporter	
Hildegarde (Hildegarde Sell)	N/A	Vocalist popular in the early 20th century; trained at Marquette's College of Music in the 1920s	
Margo Huston	1965	Reporter	
Bill Johnson		Alto saxophonist, clarinetist, and arranger	
Len Kasper	1993	Chicago Cubs broadcaster for WGN-TV	
Tom Keegan	1981	Author, journalist, radio personality	
Martin Kilcoyne	1990	Sports director, FOX 2 St. Louis	
Kate Klise	1985	Author, known for her children's books	
Greg Kot	1978	Pop music critic for the Chicago Tribune; co-host of NPR's Sound Opinions	
Jim Krueger	1989	Comic book writer	
Trenni Kusnierek		On-air personality, WTMJ (AM)	
Jen Lada	2002	Sportscaster	
Matthew Lesko	1965	Television commercial and infomercial personality	
James Lowder	1985	Author, editor, and game designer	
Amy Madigan	1972	Actress	
Joseph McCarthy	1930	Politician who served as a Republican U.S. senator from the state of Wisconsin from 1947 until his death at age 48 in 1957	
Don McNeill	1929	Radio personality known for being the creator and host of The Breakfast Club	
Jim Mitchell		Illustrator and underground comix writer/artist	
Preacher Moss	1988	Comedian and writer	
William F. Mullen III		Brigadier general, United States Marine Corps	
Peter Mulvey	1991	Folk singer-songwriter	
Kevin O'Brien		Author	
Pat O'Brien	N/A	Actor	
Bob Odenkirk	attended but did not graduate	Actor, Breaking Bad and its spin-off Better Call Saul	
Arthur Olszyk	1944	Prominent Milwaukee newsman at WTMJ-AM; later professor of broadcast journalism for seven years at Marquette	
Michele Palermo	1992	Playwright, actress, producer, and director	
Cheryl Pawelski	1989	Record producer (Omnivore Recordings)	
Jim Peck	1962	Local television personality and former game show host	
Charles P. Pierce	1975	Journalist and author of Moving the Chains: Tom Brady and the Pursuit of Everything	
Jessica Powers	N/A	Poet and Carmelite nun	
Danny Pudi	2001	Actor, Community	
John D. Rateliff		Game designer, author, J.R.R. Tolkien scholar	
Jim Romenesko		Journalist, media columnist	
Steve Rushin	1988	Former columnist, Sports Illustrated magazine	
John W. Schaum	1931	Piano teacher; writer of many books of sheet music	
Michael Schultz	1963	Filmmaker and television actor	
Rondell Sheridan	1980	Actor, known for That's So Raven	
Tom Snyder	attended but did not graduate	Former host, NBC's The Tomorrow Show	
Mark Suppelsa	1984	Anchor, WGN News Chicago	
Clifford Thompson	1944	One of the world's tallest men; remains the tallest man to appear in a Hollywood film	
Ben Tracy	1998 (BA), 2004 (MA)	Emmy Award-winning CBS News correspondent	
Don Wadewitz	2000	Sports broadcaster for the Alverno College, Racine Raiders, University of Wisconsin–Whitewater, and Milwaukee Area Technical College	
Paul W. Whear	1946	Composer, wrote the anthem of the Naval R.O.T.C.	

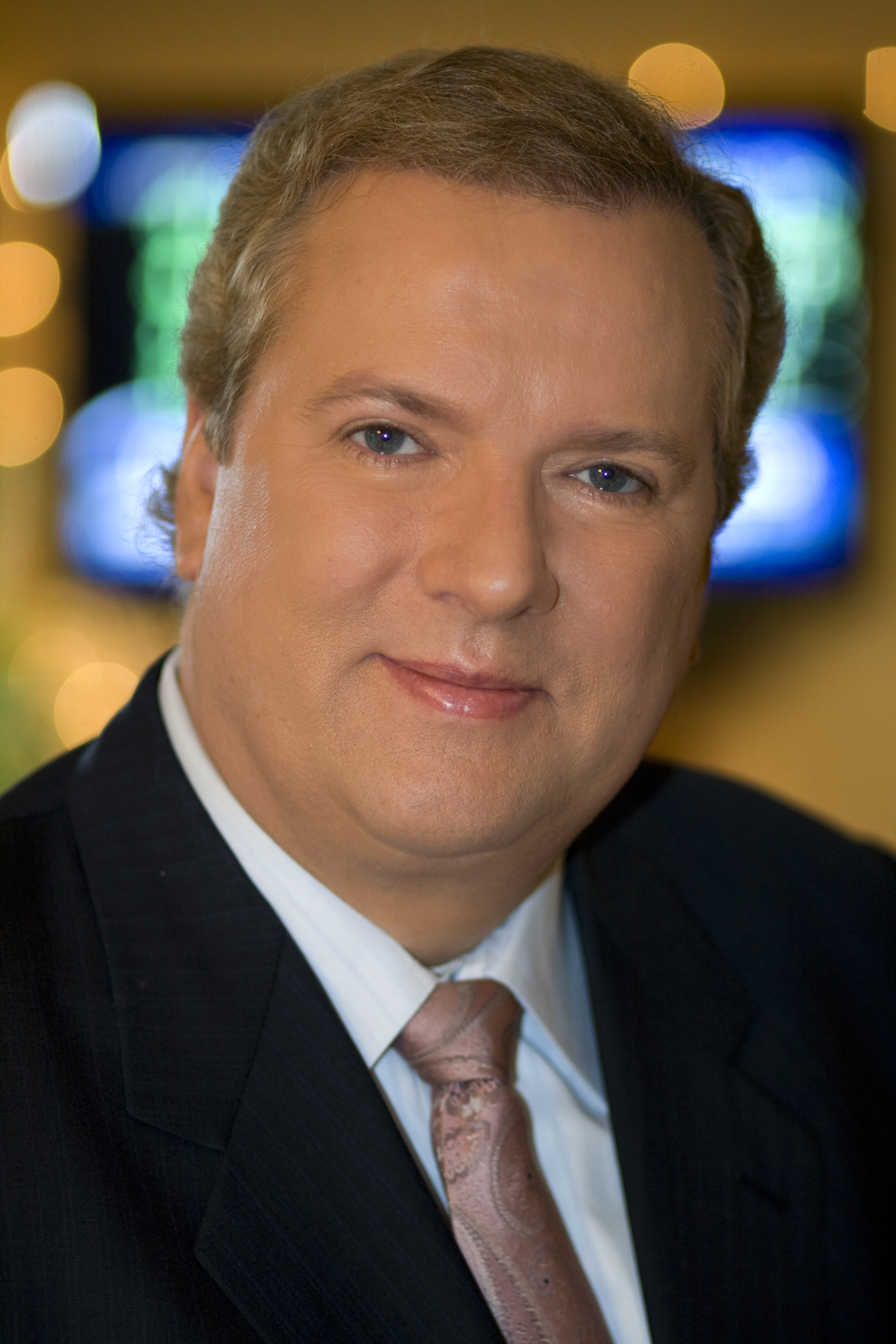
Mark Curtis

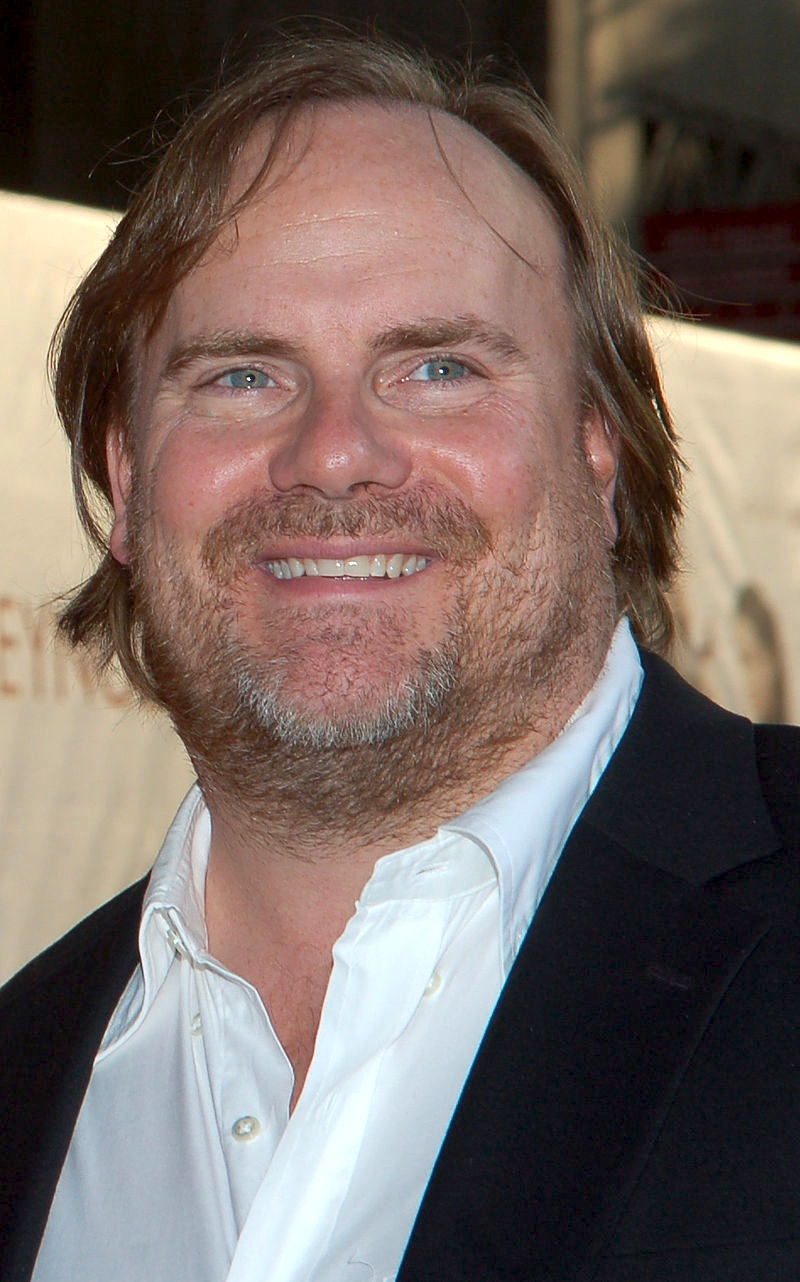
Kevin Farley

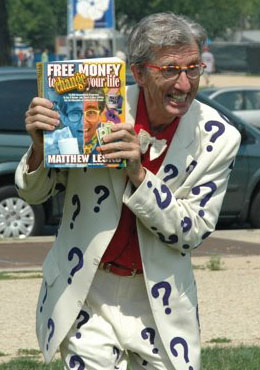
Matthew Lesko

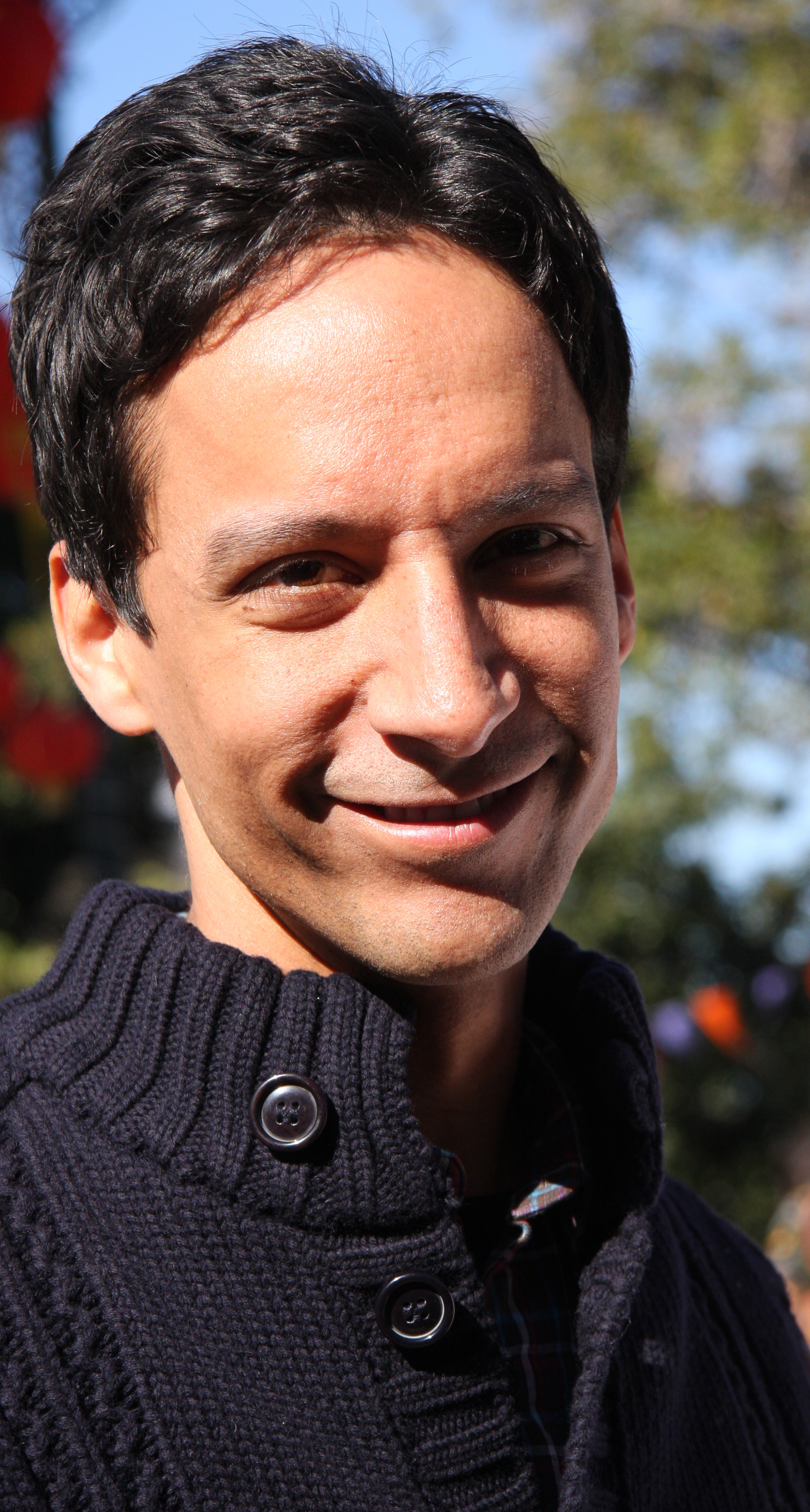
Danny Pudi

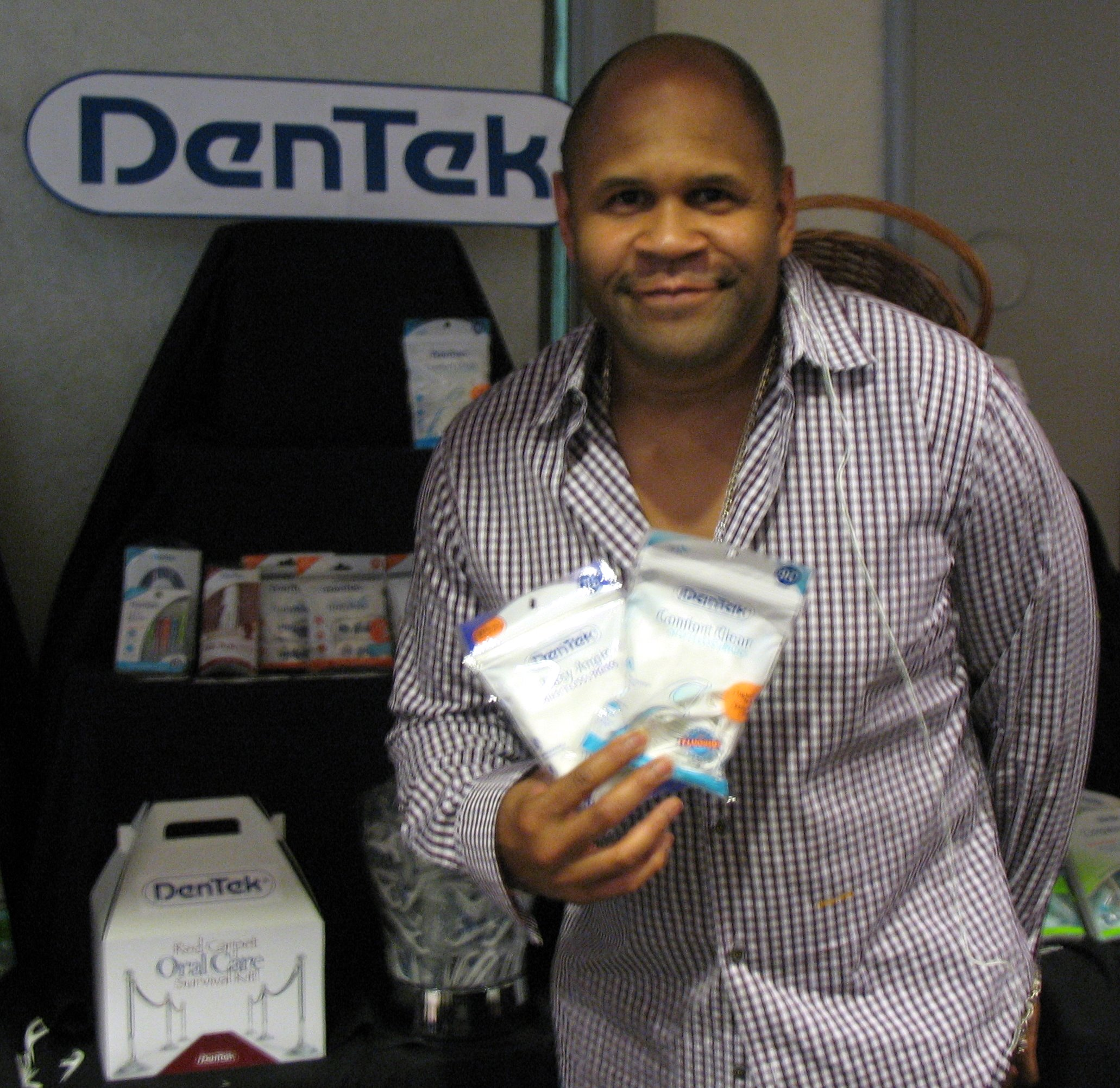
Rondell Sheridan

== Public figures ==
=== Business ===
Name	Class year	Notability	References
Susan Bird		Founder and CEO of Wf360	
Edward Brennan	1956	Former chairman of Sears, Roebuck and Company	
John Ferraro	1977	Global Chief Operating Officer, Ernst and Young, LLP	
Luther W. Graef		Founder of Graef, Anhalt, Schloemer and Associates Inc., former president of American Society of Civil Engineers	
Patrick E. Haggerty	1936	Co-founder of Texas Instruments	
Mary Houghton		Co-founder of ShoreBank	
Konstance Knox	1977	Virologist and entrepreneur known for founding Viracor, the Wisconsin Viral Research Group, and Viracor's Institute for Viral Pathogenesis	
John Rakolta	1970	CEO of Walbridge; one of the National Finance Chairs for Mitt Romney's 2008 presidential campaign	
James A. Runde	1969	Former vice chairman of Morgan Stanley	
William C. Stone	1977	Chairman and CEO of SS&C Technologies	

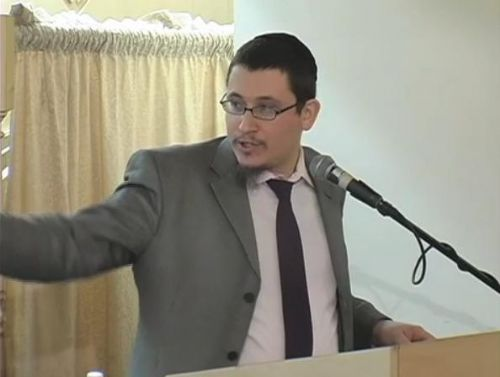
Eliyahu Federman

=== Politics and government ===
Name	Class year	Notability	References
Kathleen Abernathy	1983	Partner, Wilkinson Barker Knauer, LLP, former FCC Commissioner	
J. Waldo Ackerman	1947 (BS), 1949 (JD)	U.S. District Court judge in Illinois	
Douglas J. Adams	1998 (MS)	U.S. Navy admiral	
Tom Ament	1959 (BS), 1962 (JD)	County executive of Milwaukee County, Wisconsin, 1992–2002	
Kristina Arriaga		Vice chair, U.S. Commission on International Religious Freedom, 2016–2019	
Dolores Balderamos-García		Minister of Human Development, Women and Civil Society of Belize	
Gary J. Barczak	1961	Wisconsin legislator	
Jason E. Bartolomei	1997	U.S. Air Force general	
Gerald R. Beaman		U.S. Navy admiral	
Dismas Becker		Wisconsin legislator and civil rights activist	
Steven M. Biskupic	1983 (BA), 1987 (JD)	Prominent U.S. attorney	
Gerald J. Boileau		U.S. representative	
Warren Braun	1956 (BS), 1971 (JD)	Former Wisconsin state senator	
Cecil B. Brown, Jr.		Wisconsin legislator and civil rights activist	
F. Taylor Brown		U.S. Navy admiral	
Edward R. Brunner	1970	Former judge of the Wisconsin Court of Appeals	
Brian Burke	1978	Wisconsin attorney and legislator	
Ed Callahan		Former chairman of the National Credit Union Administration	
Carlos Camacho		Governor of Guam	
Felix Perez Camacho		Former governor of Guam	
Raymond Joseph Cannon		U.S. representative	
Louis J. Ceci		Wisconsin Supreme Court	
John T. Chisholm		District attorney of Milwaukee County, Wisconsin	
Vincent Cianci		Also known as "Buddy", former mayor of Providence, Rhode Island	
John Louis Coffey		Judge of the U.S. Court of Appeals	
Pedro Colón	1991	First elected Latino representative of the Wisconsin State Assembly	
David Cullen	1984	Member of Wisconsin State Assembly	
James P. Daley		U.S. National Guard general	
Sara Lynn Darrow	1992	District judge on the United States District Court for the Central District of Illinois	
Kerry J. Donley		Member of the Alexandria, Virginia City Council; former mayor of Alexandria, 1996–2003	
John Doyne	1934	First county executive of Milwaukee County, Wisconsin	
Diane Drufenbrock		Nun and Socialist candidate for vice president in 1980	
Terence T. Evans		Judge, United States Court of Appeals for the Seventh Circuit (appointed by President Bill Clinton, 1995); former judge and chief judge for the Eastern District of Wisconsin (appointed by President Jimmy Carter, 1979)	
Scott Evertz		First openly gay director of the Office of National AIDS Policy	
Ray Evrard	1916	Former Brown County, Wisconsin district attorney and 2nd president of the Green Bay Packers	
Margaret Farrow	1956	Former lieutenant governor of Wisconsin	
James Fleissner	1979	Attorney and a professor of Law at Mercer University School of Law	
Gerald T. Flynn		U.S. representative	
James Flynn		Lieutenant governor of Wisconsin	
Kurt Frank	1971	Former member of the Wisconsin State Senate	
Jessica Gavora	1986	Conservative writer on politics and culture, speechwriter, and former policy adviser at the U.S. Department of Justice	
Janine P. Geske		Justice of the Wisconsin Supreme Court	
John Gower		Member of Wisconsin State Assembly	
William C. Griesbach	1976 (BA), 1979 (JS)	U.S. federal judge	
E. Harold Hallows		Chief justice of the Wisconsin Supreme Court	
Ned R. Healy		U.S. representative from California	
Mark Honadel		Member of Wisconsin State Assembly	
Henry P. Hughes		Justice of Wisconsin Supreme Court	
Kathleen Hall Jamieson	1967	Dean, Annenberg School for Communication, University of Pennsylvania	
Wade Kapszukiewicz		Mayor, City of Toledo, Ohio	
William K. Kelley		Deputy counsel to George W. Bush	
Kristina Keneally		New South Wales politician	
Charles J. Kersten	1925	U.S. representative	
John C. Kleczka		U.S. representative	
Dale P. Kooyenga	2007	Member of Wisconsin State Assembly	
Dick Leinenkugel	1980	Current Wisconsin Secretary of Commerce	
Jerris Leonard	1952 (BS), 1955 (LLB)	Member of the Wisconsin Senate	
Peter F. Leuch		Former member of the Wisconsin State Assembly	
Gerald Lorge		Wisconsin politician	
Steven D. Loucks	1983	Former member of the Wisconsin State Assembly	
Brian E. Luther	1984	U.S. Navy admiral	
Donald A. Manzullo		U.S. representative from Illinois, Republican	
William A. Matheny		U.S. Air Force general	
Mary Beth Maxwell		Senior advisor in the United States Department of Labor	
Joseph McCarthy		U.S. senator, Republican	
Earl F. McEssy	1939	Former member of the Wisconsin State Assembly	
Ralph Metcalfe		US Olympian, U.S. representative	
Gerald L. Miller	1964	U.S. Marine Corps general	
Louis Molepske	2001	Member of the Wisconsin State Assembly	
Gwendolynne S. Moore	1978	U.S. representative	
Stephen Murphy III	1984	Federal judge on the United States District Court for the Eastern District of Michigan	
Edouard Nomo-Ongolo		Former government minister for Commerce and Industry (Cameroon); former general manager of Chase Bank, Cameroon; retired diplomat	
Richard C. Nowakowski	N/A	Former member of the Wisconsin State Assembly	
Leo P. O'Brien		Former member of the Wisconsin State Senate	
Jim Ott	2000	Member of the Wisconsin State Assembly	
Tony Palomo	B.S. Journalism, 1954	Journalist; historian of Guam; senator in the 12th, 14th, and 15th Guam Legislatures	
Rudolf "Rudy" Perpich		Former governor of Minnesota	
Douglas G. Perry		U.S. Navy Vice Admiral	
Milton Rice Polland		Progressive Republican leader, ambassador-at-large for the Republic of the Marshall Islands	
Don Pridemore	1977	Member of the Wisconsin State Assembly	
Kenneth M. Quinn		President of the World Food Prize Foundation, former U.S. Ambassador to Cambodia	
David Rabinovitz	1927	U.S. District Court judge	
Michele Radosevich	1969	U.S. politician and lawyer	
Toby Roth		U.S. representative	
Loret Miller Ruppe		U.S. diplomat	
Ben L. Salomon		Medal of Honor recipient	
Paul J. Schlise	1989 (BS)	U.S. Navy admiral	
John Schmitz		U.S. representative, 1972 American Independent Party presidential candidate	
Martin J. Schreiber		Former governor of Wisconsin	
Wilfred Schuele		Former member of the Wisconsin State Assembly and Wisconsin State Senate	
Kevin R. Slates	1982	U.S. Navy admiral	
Francis Slay		Mayor of St. Louis, Missouri	
Douglas W. Small	1988 (BS)	U.S. Navy admiral	
Lawrence H. Smith		U.S. representative	
Greg Stanton	1992 (BA)	U.S. representative	
Dave Sullivan		State senator of Illinois, 1998–2006; on Crane's Chicago Business "Top 40 Under 40"	
Diane S. Sykes		Judge, United States Court of Appeals for the Seventh Circuit; former justice of the Wisconsin Supreme Court; appointed by President George W. Bush, 2002	
John H. Szymarek	1895	Former member of the Wisconsin State Assembly	
John F. Tefft		Deputy chief of mission at the United States Embassy in Moscow, 1996–1999; United States ambassador to Lithuania, 2000–2003; ambassador of the United States to Georgia, 2005–present	
Robert Emmet Tehan	1927 (AB), 1929 (LL.B.)	Former United States federal judge	
Froilan Tenorio	1967	Former governor of the United States Commonwealth of the Northern Mariana Islands	
Lewis D. Thill		U.S. representative	
Barbara Toles	1997	Member of the Wisconsin State Assembly	
Stephen A. Turcotte		U.S. Navy admiral	
Luis R. Visot		U.S. Army major general	
Leah Vukmir	1980	Member of Wisconsin Senate	
Scott Walker	N/A	Former governor of Wisconsin; did not actually graduate from Marquette University	
Thaddeus Wasielewski		U.S. representative	
Don S. Wenger		U.S. Air Force major general	
Patrick Willis	1972	Circuit court judge in Manitowoc County, Wisconsin	
Tadashi Yamamoto	MBA 1962	Founder of the Japan Center for International Exchange, the Shimoda Conference, and the U.S.-Japan Parliamentary Exchange Program	
Francis A. Yindra		Former member of the Wisconsin State Assembly and the Wisconsin State Senate	
Clement J. Zablocki		U.S. representative	
Richard J. Zaborski	1953	Former member of the Wisconsin State Senate	
Carl Zeidler		Former mayor of Milwaukee	
Annette Ziegler	1989	Justice on the Wisconsin Supreme Court	

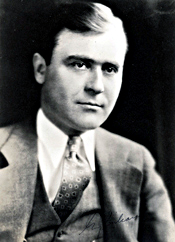
Gerald J. Boileau

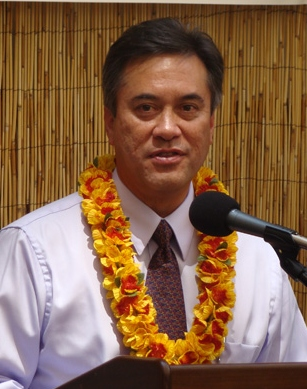
Felix Perez Camacho

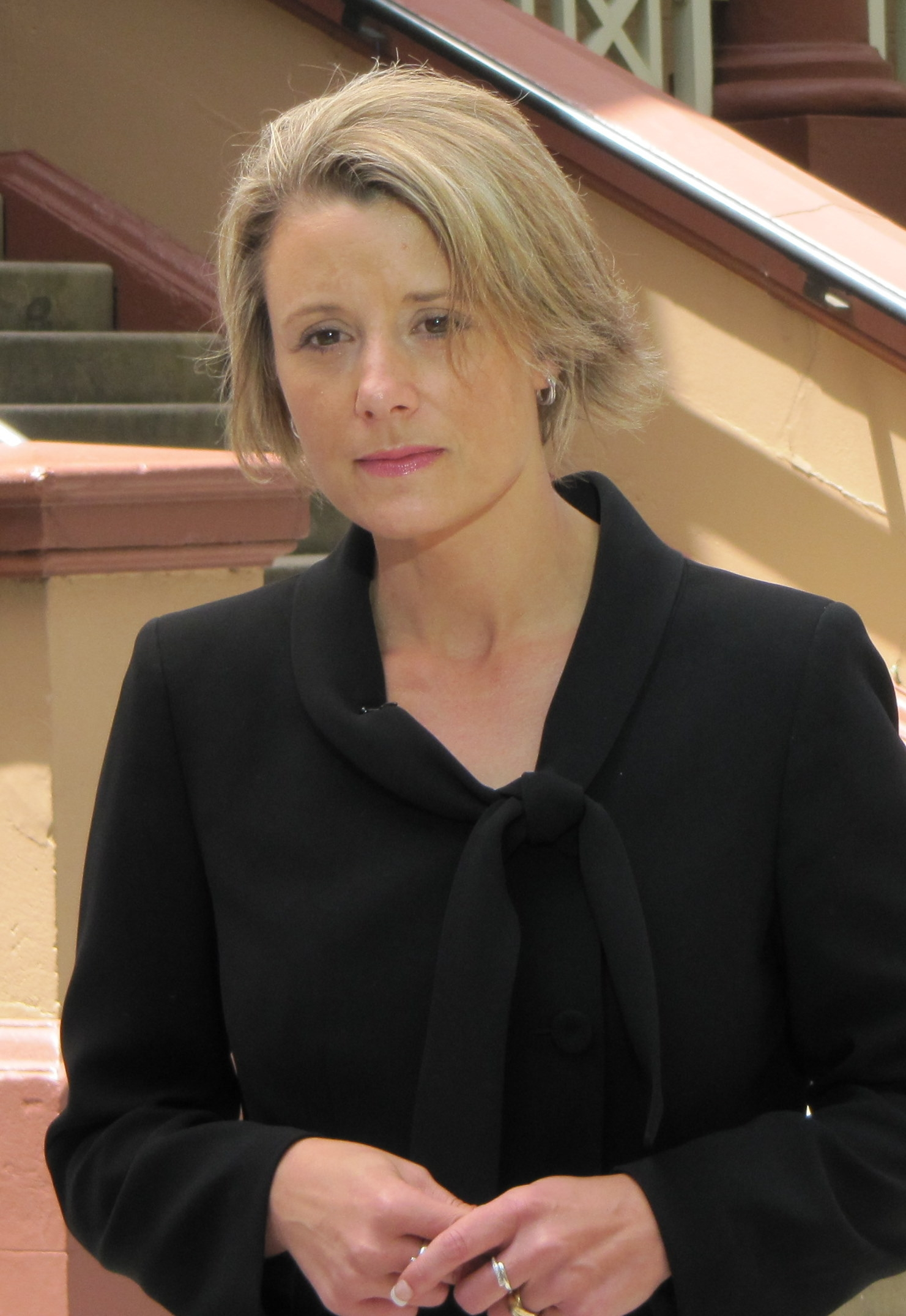
Kristina Keneally

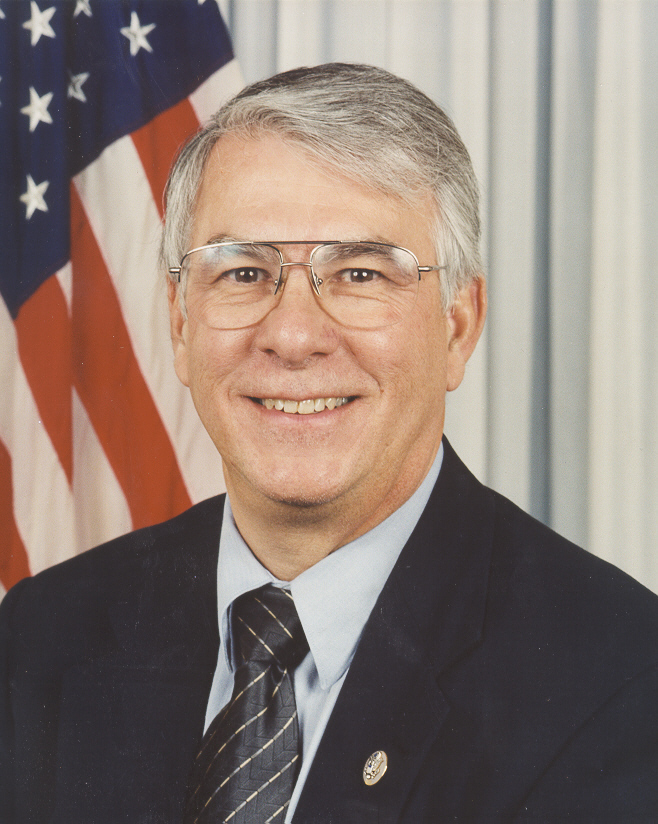
Don Manzullo

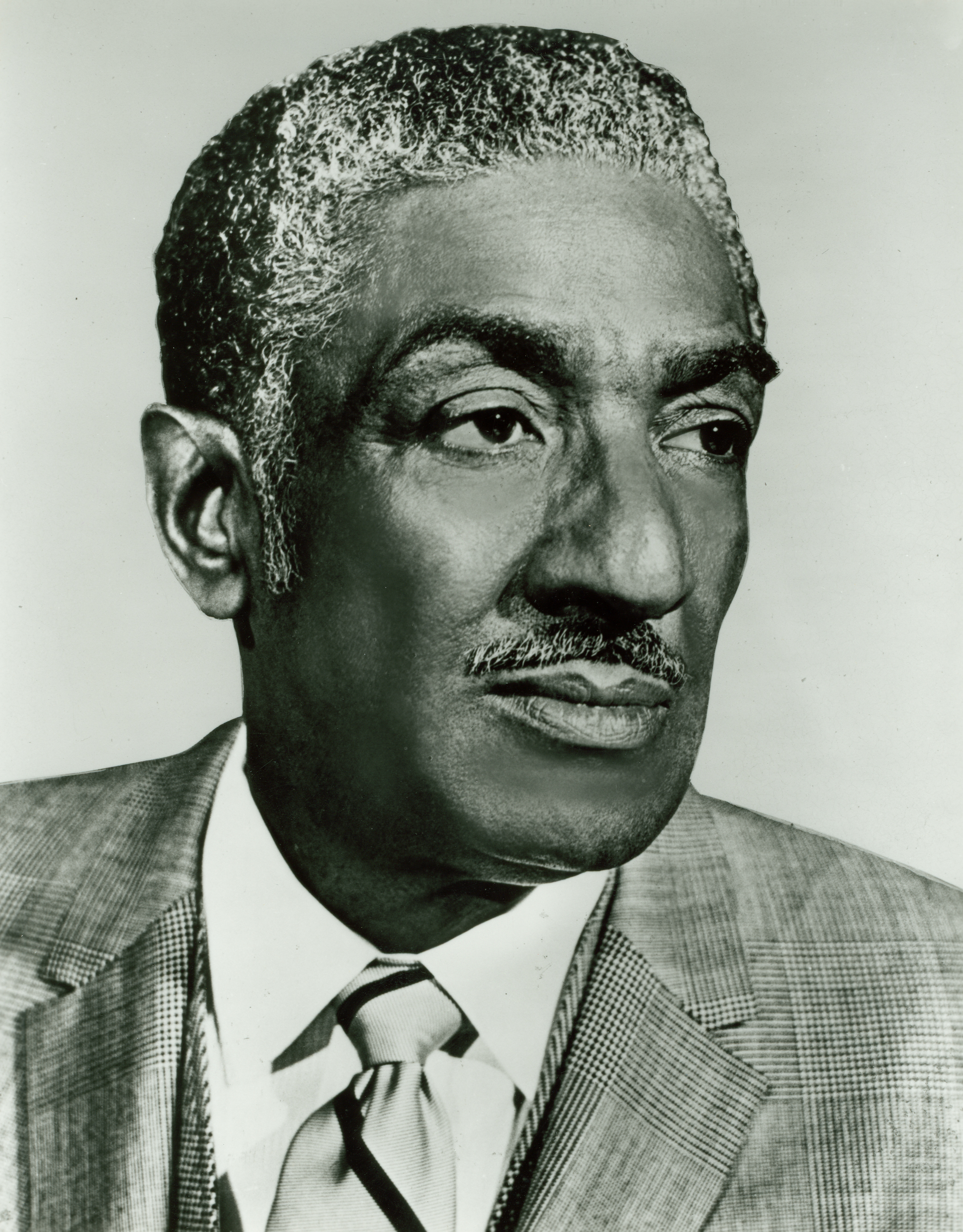
Ralph Metcalfe

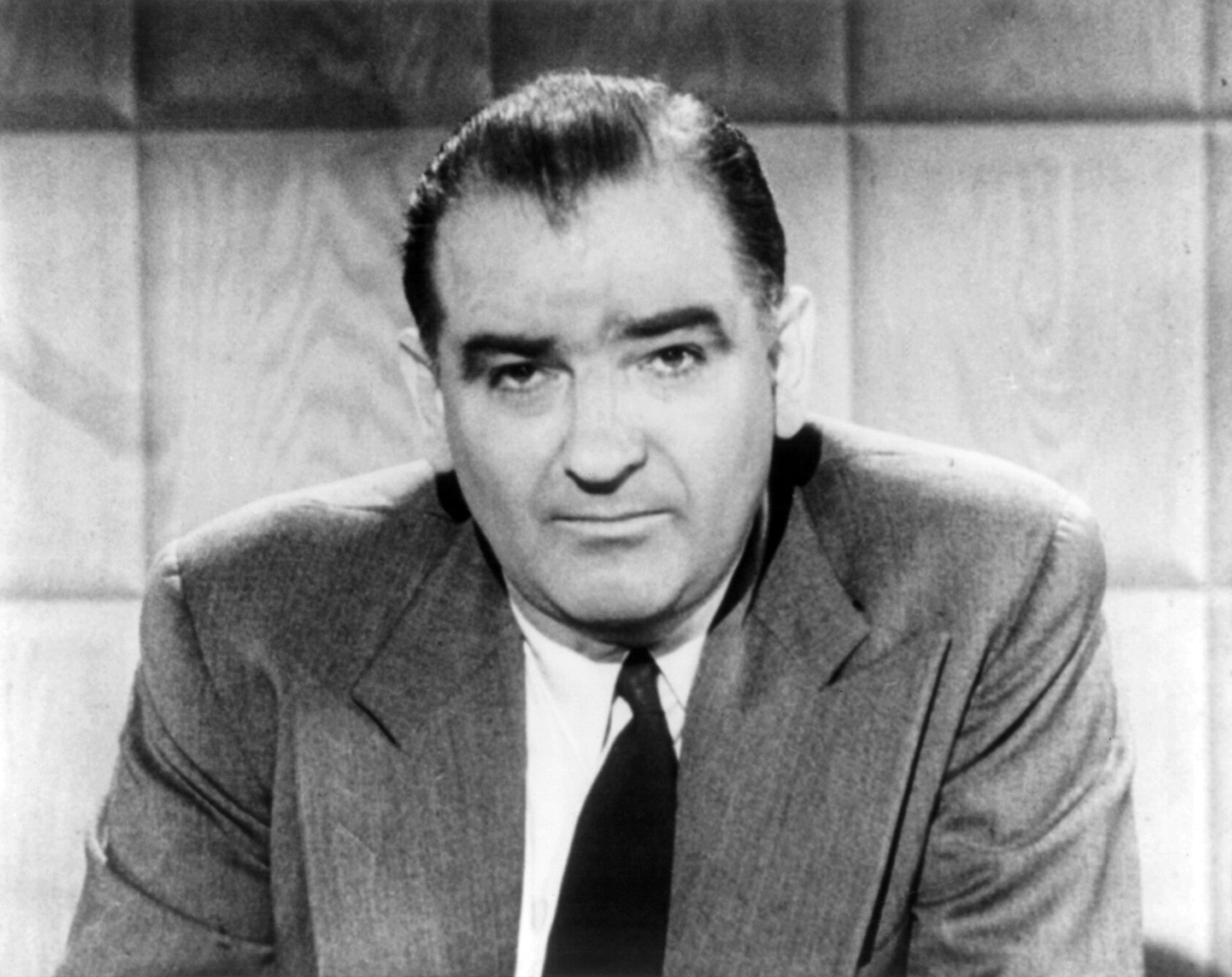
Joseph McCarthy

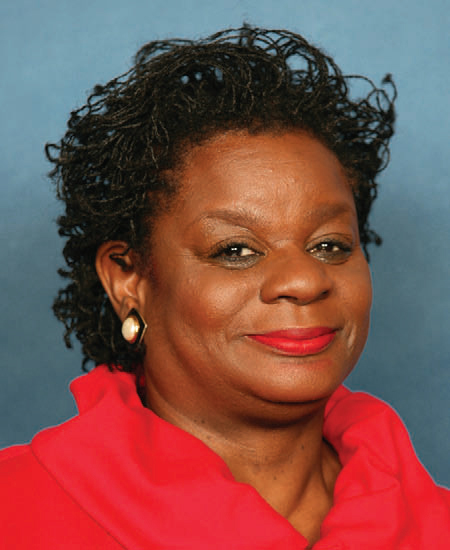
Gwen Moore

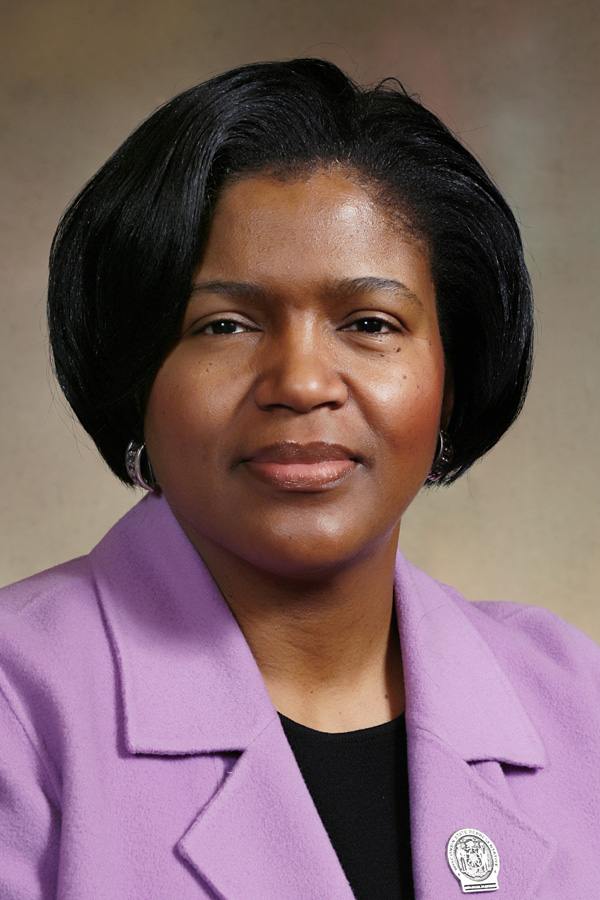
Barbara Toles

== Humanities and social sciences ==
Name	Class year	Notability	References
Semhar Araia	1999	Social activist and international lawyer	
Robert J. Beck		Scholar of international law and international relations	
Paul Chamberlain		Theologian, philosopher	
Mary Collins		Theologian, Benedictine nun	
Paul Copan		Professor of Philosophy and Ethics at Palm Beach Atlantic University	
Walter A. Davis	1964 (BA), 1966 (MA)	Philosopher, critic, playwright, and author of books on psychoanalysis, Marxism, existentialism, Hegelian dialectics and postmodernism	
Shari Dunn		Lawyer, non-profit executive, author	
Marc H. Ellis		Theologian, philosopher	
Roberto S. Goizueta	1984	Theologian	
Scott Hahn		Theologian	
John Maxwell Hamilton	1969	Executive vice chancellor and provost of Louisiana State University	
Elizabeth Hirschboeck		Humanitarian	
Donald J. Hying		Roman Catholic bishop	
Mel Lawrenz		Author, speaker, and senior pastor of Elmbrook Church, the largest church in Wisconsin	
William D. Lutz		Linguist	
William Marr	1963	Poet and translator; author of books of Chinese poetry	
Janice McLaughlin	1969	nun, missionary, and human rights activist	
William Patrick O'Connor		Fifth bishop of Superior (1942-46); first bishop of Madison (1946–67)	
John Joseph Paul	1956	Bishop emeritus of the Roman Catholic Diocese of La Crosse	
John Peter Pelissero	1975	Provost and professor of Political Science Loyola University Chicago	
Michael R. Strain	2004	Senior fellow and Arthur F. Burns Chair in Political Economy at the American Enterprise Institute	
Alexa Suelzer		Author, educator and theologian known for her Old Testament criticism	
Paul Francis Tanner		Bishop of the Roman Catholic Diocese of St. Augustine	
Kerry S. Walters	1980	Professor of Philosophy at Gettysburg College and award-winning author of numerous books on philosophy and religion	
William J. Whalen		Nonfiction writer, expert on comparative religion	
Winifred O. Whelan	1969	Member of the School Sisters of St. Francis, academic, writer, and Wikipedian	

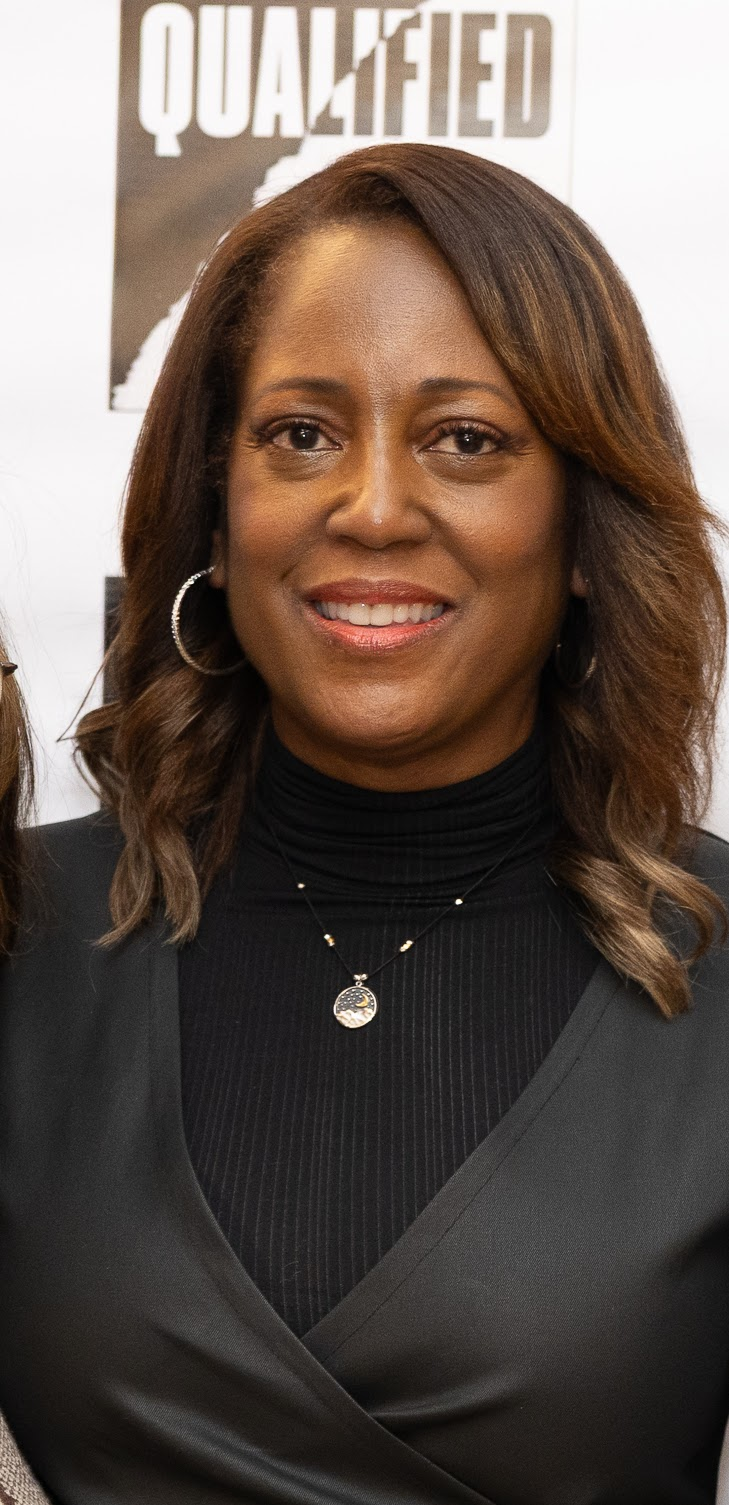
Shari Dunn

== Engineering and sciences ==
Name	Class year	Notability	References
Lionel Dahmer	1962	Research chemist and author; father of serial killer Jeffrey Dahmer	
George Delahunty	1979	Physiologist, endocrinologist, and Lilian Welsh Professor of Biology at Goucher College	
Joanna Isabel Mayer	1931	Prominent mathematician; first PhD graduate in mathematics	
Donald Laub	1960	Prominent plastic surgeon; chief of Plastic Surgery at Stanford University School of Medicine 1968–1980	
Robert B. Pinter	1957	Biomedical engineer and authority on signal processing in the insect visual system	

Robert B. Pinter

== Sports ==
Name	Class year	Notability	References
George Allen		NFL head coach, member of the Pro Football Hall of Fame	
George Andrie		Dallas Cowboys player	
Ray Apolskis		NFL player	
Frank Aschenbrenner		Professional football player	
Ed Aspatore		NFL player	
Wayland Becker		NFL player	
Al Bentzin		NFL player	
Gene Berce		NBA player	
Dick Bilda		NFL player	
Frank Bohlmann		NFL player	
Jim Boylan		NBA assistant coach, currently with the Milwaukee Bucks	
Tom Braatz		NFL player and general manager	
David Braden		NFL player	
Brian Brunkhorst		Professional basketball player	
Ray Buivid		NFL player	
Art Bultman		NFL player for the Brooklyn Dodgers and Green Bay Packers	
Ray Busler		NFL player	
Jimmy Butler	2011	NBA player for the Miami Heat	
Dick Campbell		NFL player	
Jim Capuzzi		NFL player	
Jim Chones		Former ABA and NBA player	
Tom Copa		NBA player	
Chris Crawford		Played seven years with the NBA's Atlanta Hawks	
Tommy Cronin		NFL player	
Jae Crowder		NBA player for the Utah Jazz	
Ward Cuff		Former New York Giants player	
Don Curtin		NFL player	
Pahl Davis		NFL player	
Travis Diener		Point guard with the NBA's Portland Trail Blazers	
Lavern Dilweg		NFL player; U.S. representative	
Danny Downes		Retired professional mixed martial artist formerly with the WEC and the UFC	
Bill Downey		Professional basketball player	
Ron Drzewiecki		NFL player	
Wilfred Duford		NFL player	
Red Dunn		NFL player	
Maurice "Bo" Ellis	1977	Former NBA player and college basketball coach	
Steve Enich		NFL player	
John Fahay		NFL player	
Dick Flaherty		NFL player	
Lawrence Frank		Former NBA head coach and current president of Basketball Operations for Los Angeles Clippers	
William Gates		A protagonist in the movie Hoop Dreams	
Ed Glick		NFL player	
John Goodyear		NFL player	
George Groves		Professional football player	
Arthur Guepe		Commissioner of the Ohio Valley Conference	
Pete Hall		NFL player	
Bo Hanley		NFL player and head coach	
Bob Harlan		Former president and chief executive officer, Green Bay Packers	
John Harrington		Professional football player	
Norbert Hayes		NFL player	
Lazar Hayward		NBA player currently signed by the Minnesota Timberwolves	
Lester Hearden		NFL player	
Johnny Heimsch		NFL player	
Darius Johnson-Odom	2012	NBA player for the Los Angeles Lakers	
Swede Johnston		NFL player	
Mike Jurewicz		MLB player	
Dorothy Kamenshek		AAGPBL player	
Karl Kassulke		NFL player	
Al Klug		Professional football player	
Don Kojis		Two-time NBA All-Star	
Frank Kosikowski		Professional football player	
Jack Kramer		Professional football player	
Ray Kuffel		Professional football player	
Bob Lackey		Professional basketball player	
Joe LaFleur		NFL player	
Oxie Lane		NFL player	
Irv Langhoff		NFL player	
Erica Larson		Five-time winner of the Pikes Peak Marathon	
Alfred "Butch" Lee		MVP of the 1977 Final Four; former NBA player	
Emery Lehman		Olympic speed skater	
Frank Linnan		NFL player	
Maurice Lucas		Won 1977 NBA Championship with Portland Trail Blazers	
Jerry Lunz		NFL player	
Mel Maceau		Professional football player	
Pudge MacKenzie		NHL player	
Rick Majerus		Head basketball coach of St. Louis University; former commentator for ESPN, head basketball coach at Marquette University, Ball State University and the University of Utah	
Wesley Matthews		NBA player	
Amal McCaskill		NBA player	
Francis J. McCormick		NFL player	
Larry McGinnis		NFL player	
Allie McGuire	1973	NBA player	
Jim McIlvaine		Played seven years in the NBA with the Washington Bullets, Seattle SuperSonics and New Jersey Nets	
Larry McNeill		NBA player	
Dean Meminger		NBA player	
Frank Mestnik		NFL player	
Ralph Metcalfe		World-record holding sprinter and Olympic gold medalist	
Steve Novak		NBA player, most recently of the New York Knicks	
Ken Radick		NFL player for the Green Bay Packers and Brooklyn Dodgers	
Glenn "Doc" Rivers	1985	NBA star; head coach of Philadelphia 76ers	
Herb Roedel		Professional football player	
Fritz Roeseler		NFL player	
Gene Ronzani		NFL player and head coach	
Leroy Schoemann		NFL player	
Carl Schuette		NFL player	
Vincent Shekleton		NFL player	
Ralph Shinners		Center fielder for New York Giants and St. Louis Cardinals; remains the only Major League player to come out of Marquette	
John Sisk, Jr.		NFL player	
Tony Smith		Former NBA player drafted by the Los Angeles Lakers in 1990	
Johnny Strzykalski		NFL player	
Claude Taugher		NFL player	
Joe Thomas		NBA player	
Milt Trost		NFL player	
Don Vosberg		NFL player	
Dwyane Wade	2003	retired NBA player for the Miami Heat	
Lloyd Walton		NBA player	
Brian Wardle		Head coach of Bradley Braves men's basketball	
Ken Wendt		NFL player	
Jerome Whitehead		NBA player	
Mike Wilson		NBA player	
Whitey Woodin		NFL player	
Sam Worthen		NBA player	
Joe Young		Professional football player	

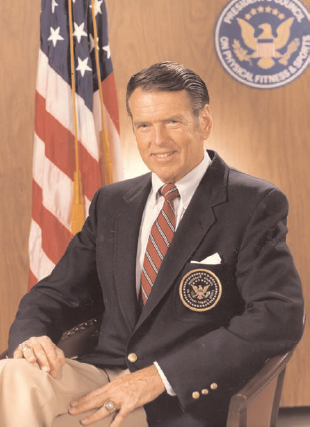
George Allen

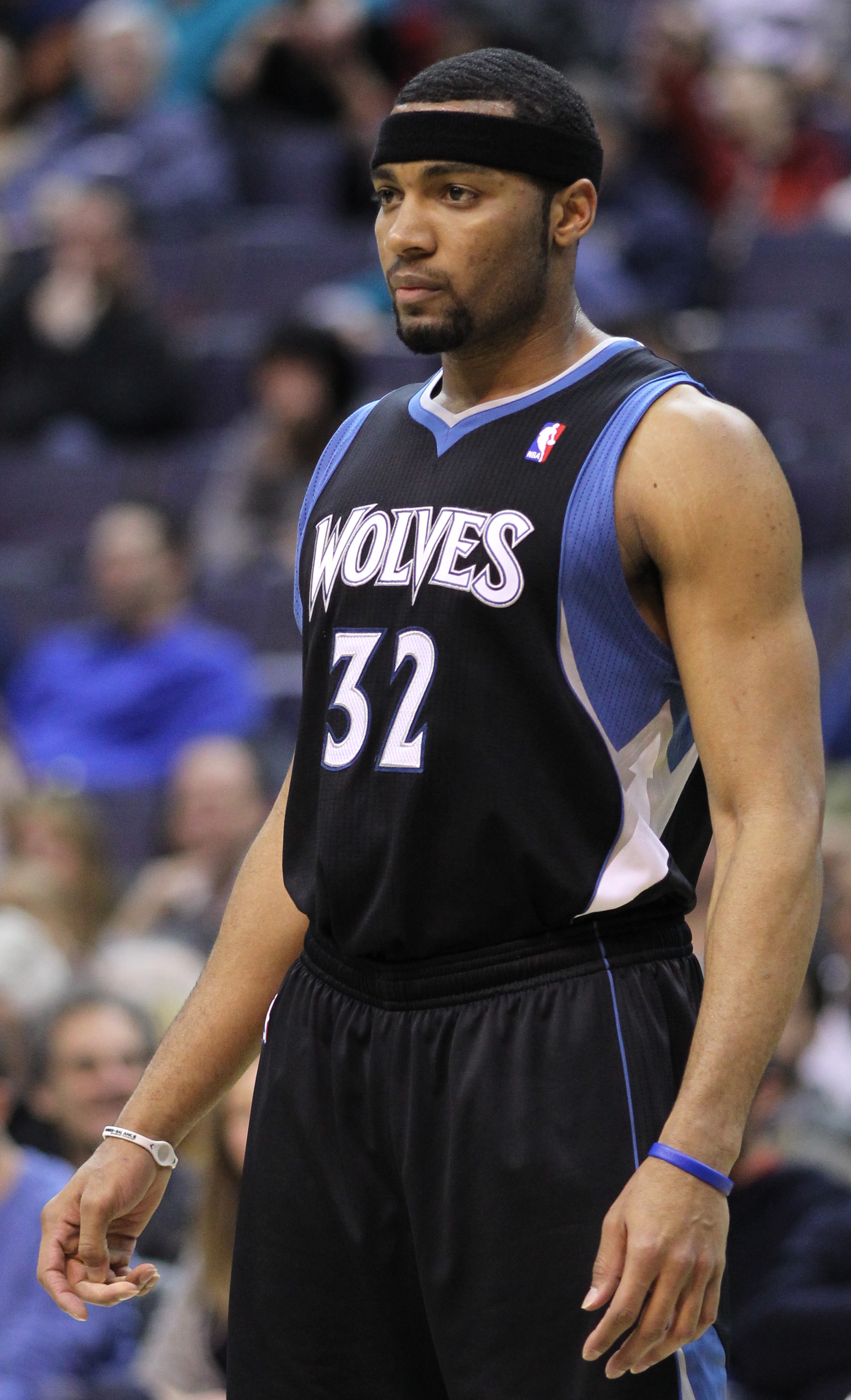
Lazar Hayward

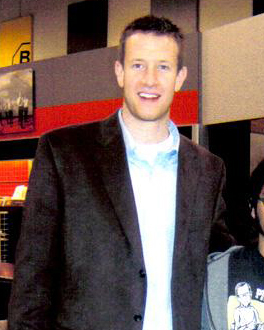
Steve Novak

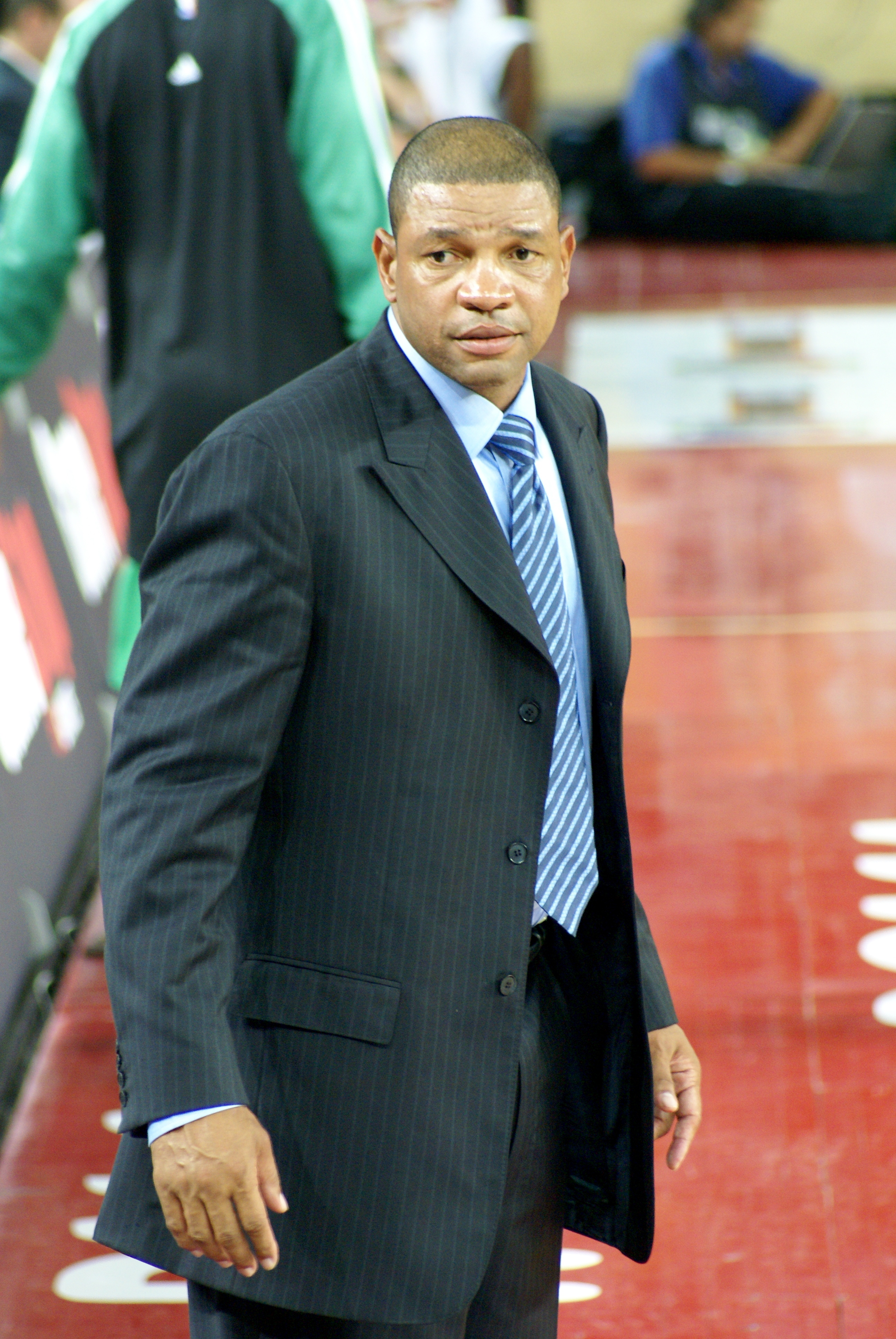
Glenn "Doc" Rivers

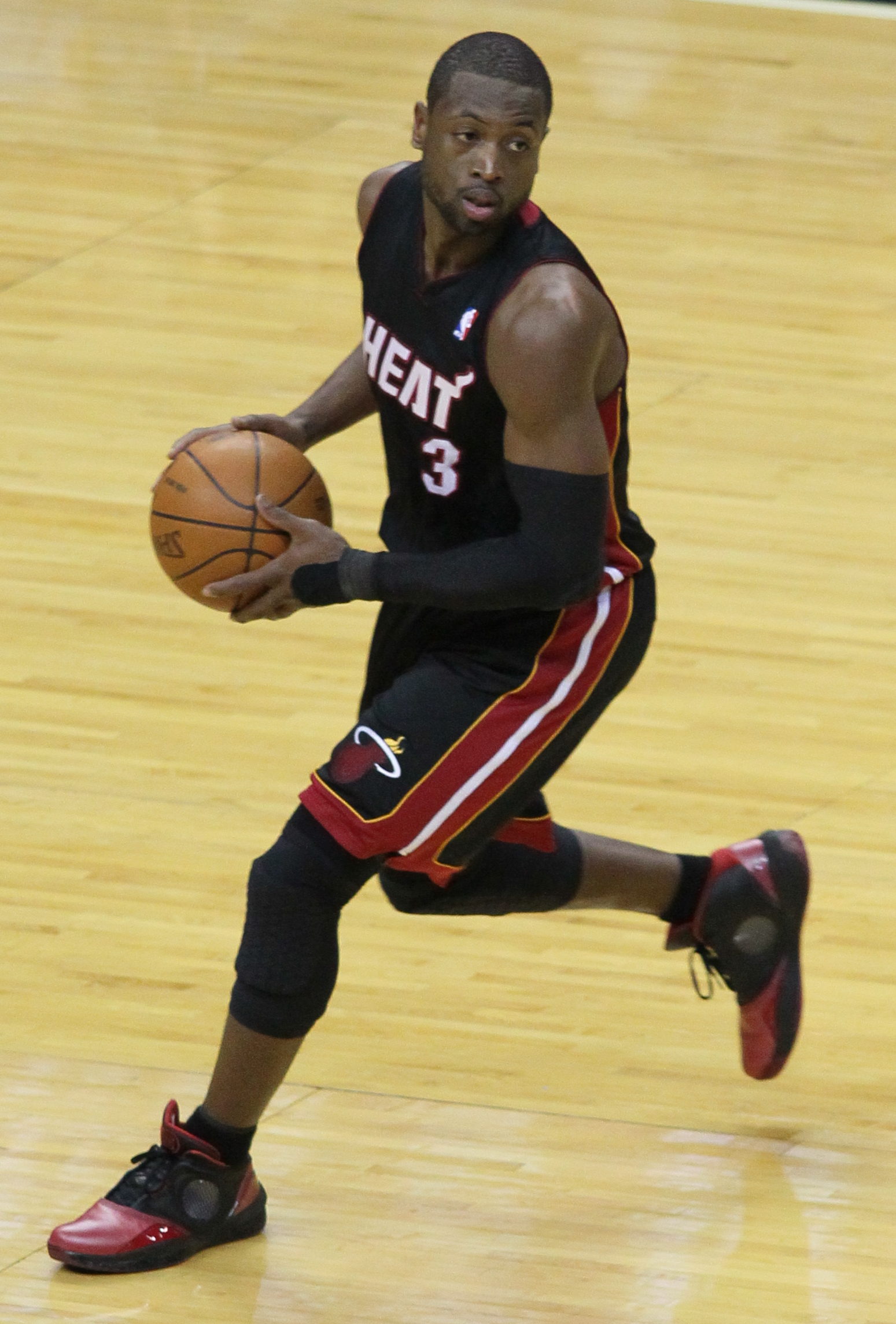
Dwyane Wade

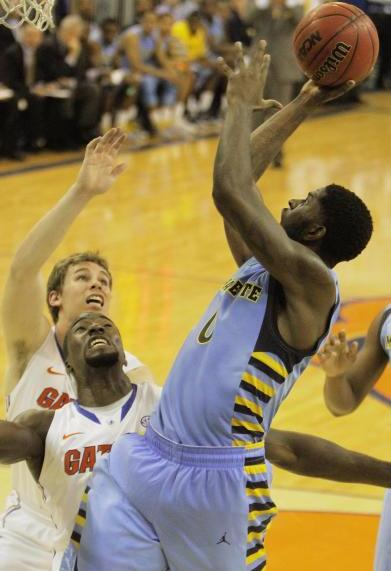
Jamil Wilson

- Niv Berkowitz (born 1986), Israeli basketball player in the Israeli Basketball Premier League
- Sandy Cohen (born 1995), American-Israeli professional basketball player for Maccabi Tel Aviv of the Israeli Basketball Premier League and the EuroLeague
- Natisha Hiedeman (born 1997), basketball player for the Israeli team Maccabi Bnot Ashdod and the Connecticut Sun of the Women's National Basketball Association (WNBA)
- Gabe Levin (born 1994), American-Israeli basketball player in the Israeli Basketball Premier League
- Jamil Wilson (born 1990), basketball player for Hapoel Jerusalem in the Israeli Basketball Premier League
