= List of Carroll University alumni =

Carroll University is a private liberal arts college in Waukesha, Wisconsin. Following are some of its notable alumni.

== Business ==
Name	Class	Major	Notability	References
Steven Burd	1971	Economics	Chairman and president and CEO of Safeway Inc.	
Donald Goerke	1949	Mathematics	Inventor of SpaghettiOs	
Michael Jaharis	1950	Business administration	Founder of Kos Pharmaceuticals and Vatera Healthcare Partners LLC, and co-founder of Arisaph Pharmaceuticals	
Gregg Steinhafel	1977	Business administration	President and chairman of the board of Target Corporation	

== Clergy ==
Name	Class	Major	Notability	References
Mel Lawrenz	1977	English and religion	Author, speaker, and former senior pastor of Elmbrook church	
William C. R. Sheridan	1939	Liberal arts	Episcopal bishop of Northern Indiana	
Edward M. Turner		BA	Episcopal prelate and bishop of the Virgin Islands	
Robert Varley	1945	BA	Bishop of The Episcopal Church	
Arthur A. Vogel		Non-degreed	Bishop of the Episcopal Diocese of West Missouri	

== Education ==
Name	Class	Major	Notability	References
Stephen Blumenfeld	1979	Sociology	Senior lecturer and director of the Centre for Labour Employment and Work at Victoria University of Wellington	
James Bonk	1953	Chemistry	Chemistry professor at Duke University	
Howard Fuller	1962	Sociology and history	Civil rights activist and co-founder of the Malcolm X Liberation University	
Ray David Owen	1937	Biology	Chairman of the Caltech Division of Biology	
Michael Persinger		Non-degreed	Professor of psychology at Laurentian University	
Grant Showerman		Non-degreed	Classical scholar at the University of Wisconsin–Madison	
David A. Strand	1958		President of Illinois State University	

== Art and entertainment ==
Name	Class	Major	Notability	References
Matt Christman			Co-host of Chapo Trap House	
James Daly		Non-degreed	Theater, film, and Emmy Award-winning television actor	
Alfred Lunt	1914	Non-degreed	Actor and director	
Fred MacMurray		Non-degreed	Film and television actor	
Dennis Morgan	1930		Actor	
Olaf Odegaard	1961		Artist and playwright	
Janet Parshall			Syndicated radio talk show host	
Harper Starling		Kinesiology	Recording artist, songwriter, and dancer	
Eric Szmanda	1997		Actor known for the television show CSI	
William A. Wojnar	1974		Classical organist and professor of music	

== Government and civil service ==
Name	Class	Major	Notability	References
Laura Gutiérrez	1995	Spanish and biology	Secretary of the Wisconsin Department of Safety and Professional Services	
Justin Jacobs	2003	Mathematics and computer science	Applied research mathematician at the National Security Agency, independent sports analytics researcher, and 2014 PECASE winner	
Maybelle Maud Park	1891		Physician and director of the Wisconsin Child Welfare Department of the State Board of Control	
Antonio R. Riley	1987	Political science and history	Midwest Regional administrator of the United States Department of Housing and Urban Development	

== Law ==
Name	Class	Major	Notability	References
David L. Dancey	1938		Wisconsin Circuit Court judge and Wisconsin State Assembly	
Fred Foreman	1970		United States attorney for the Northern District of Illinois	
Daniel Kelly	1986	Spanish and political science	Attorney and former justice of the Wisconsin Supreme Court	

== Literature and journalism ==
Name	Class	Major	Notability	References
John Ball	1934		Novelist, music critic, and Emmy Award recipient from the Mystery Writers of America	
Doug Larson		English	Columnist and editor for the Door County Advocate	
Lucius W. Nieman			Founder of the Milwaukee Journal	

== Military ==
Name	Class	Major	Notability	References
James P. Daley	1977	Political science and history	U.S. National Guard general	
Michael J. Schwerin	1988	Psychology	U.S. Navy rear admiral	
John Patten Story	1857		Major general in the United States Army	
David W. Winn		Non-degreed	U.S. Air Force general	

== Politics ==
Name	Class	Major	Notability	References
Sheryl Albers		Non-degreed	Wisconsin State Assembly	
John M. Alberts	1957	B.S.	Wisconsin State Assembly	
John F. Buckley			Wisconsin State Assembly	
Cushman K. Davis		Non-degreeed	Governor of Minnesota and U.S. senator	
David L. Dancey	1938		Wisconsin State Assembly and Wisconsin Circuit Court judge	
Cushman Kellogg Davis		Non-degreed	United States Senate and governor of Minnesota	
Lyle E. Douglass			Wisconsin State Assembly	
William Edwards			Wisconsin Senate and Wisconsin State Assembly	
Lucius Fairchild		Non-degreed	Governor of Wisconsin and U.S. minister to Spain	
Paul Farrow	1991		Wisconsin Senate	
William Henry Hardy			Wisconsin State Assembly	
Manville S. Hodgson			Wisconsin State Assembly	
Oswald H. Johnson		PhD	Wisconsin State Assembly	
Phil H. Jones	1894		Wisconsin State Assembly	
Theodore S. Jones		Non-degreed	Wisconsin State Assembly	
Einer P. Lund		PhD	Wisconsin State Assembly	
Vincent R. Mathews	1934	Business	Wisconsin State Assembly	
James A. McKenzie			Wisconsin State Assembly	
Paul Melotik	1979	Accounting and business management	Wisconsin State Assembly	
Earl D. Morton	1949	A.B.	Wisconsin State Assembly	
Adam Neylon	2008	B.A.	Wisconsin State Assembly	
David W. Opitz	1968	BS	Wisconsin Senate	
Watkins Overton		A.B.	Mayor of Memphis, Tennessee	
Henry C. Schadeberg	1938	B.A.	United States House of Representatives	
Douglas C. Steltz			Wisconsin State Assembly	
Vernon W. Thomson		Non-degreed	Former Wisconsin governor and United States House of Representatives	

== Sports ==
Name	Class	Major	Notability	References
Walt Ambrose	1930		Professional football player	
Herb Bizer	1930		Professional football player	
John W. Breen	1935		Professional football player and NFL personnel manager	
Pat Cerroni	1992		Head football coach at the University of Wisconsin–Oshkosh	
Moxie Dalton			Professional football player	
John Edmund Fries	1910		College football coach	
Karl George			Professional football player	
Rudy Gollomb			Professional football player with the Philadelphia Eagles	
Bill Hempel			Professional football player	
Kirk Hershey			Professional football player	
Frank Hertz			Professional football player with the Milwaukee Badgers	
Bill Irwin	1962		Professional wrestler	
Buzz Knoblauch	1936		Professional basketball player	
Mark Krzykowski			College athletics administrator and former college football coach	
Wally Lemm	1942		NFL head coach and college football coach	
Ivan Quinn			Professional football player	
Ed Sparr			Professional football player	
Gil Sterr			Professional football player	
Claude Taugher		Non-degreed	Professional football player for the Green Bay Packers	
Augie Vander Meulen	1932		Professional basketball player	
Buff Wagner			Professional football player for the Green Bay Packers	
