= No Regrets Conference =

Annual American Christian conference

Men praying at the No Regrets Conference

The No Regrets Conference is a yearly, Wisconsin-based Christian men's conference hosted at Elmbrook Church starting in 1994. As of 2017, the conference is live-streamed to satellite sites throughout the world.

As stated on the conference website: "No Regrets Men's Ministries is a worldwide men’s ministry committed to equipping local church leaders to disciple men who disciple men – empowering the next generation to multiply themselves by becoming servant leaders at home, in church, on the job and out in the world."

== History ==
The yearly conference is generally held on the first Saturday of February. Upwards of 5,000 men come from around the state to pray, hear keynote sessions, attend seminars, meet with other men or get information about volunteer opportunities (both locally and globally). There is a special teen track of seminars. There is also a men's ministry track of seminars that develops church staff into better leaders.

The main conference location is Elmbrook Church in Brookfield, Wisconsin. In 2009, the conference was concurrently held at Westbrook Church in Delafield, Wisconsin and New Testament church in Milwaukee, Wisconsin. The conference is almost entirely run by over 200 volunteers.

== Seminars ==
Seminar topics range throughout a variety of topics including:

- Engaging With Your Community
- Finances - A Heavenly Perspective
- Living in Your Step-Family and Leading with Love (Blended Families)
- Meeting Jesus For the First Time
- Prayer: After God's Own Heart
- Understanding the Technology in Your Kid's Life

== Keynote speakers ==
Keynote Session at the No Regrets Conference.

Year	Theme	Keynote Speaker	Speaker Info
2014	All In	N/A	
2013	Transformed	James MacDonald	Co-founded Harvest Bible Chapel
2012	?	Tony Evans	Senior pastor Oak Cliff Bible Fellowship
2011	Rock Solid	Stu Weber	Lead pastor at Good Shepherd Community Church near Gresham, Oregon for 32 years.
2010	?	Voddie Baucham	Referred to as an “Evangelist to intellectuals”
2009	Stand Firm	Tom Mullins	Founder and senior pastor of Christ Fellowship, travels on behalf of EQUIP, Campus Crusade for Christ and Athletes in Action
2008	A Life of Significance	Kenny Luck	President and founder of Every Man Ministries, men's pastor at Saddleback Church
2007	Finish Strong	Gordon MacDonald	Pastor of Centerpoint Church in Concord, New Hampshire
2006	Knowing God	Chip Ingram	President and teaching pastor for Living on the Edge, an international teaching and discipleship ministry.
2005	Following Christ	Stuart Briscoe	Evangelical Christian speaker and author, former senior pastor of Elmbrook Church
2004	Men of Integrity	Steve Farrar	Founder and chairman of Men's Leadership Ministries
2003	Men of Influence	Gilbert Lennox	
2002	Men of Compassion	Clive Calver	President of World Relief
2001	Men of Purpose	Crawford Loritts, Jr.	Associate director, U.S. Ministries, for Campus Crusade for Christ
2000	Men of Truth	Steve Sonderman/Dick Staub	Associate pastor of men's ministry at Elmbrook Church/Pastoral staff of Orcas Island Community Church
1999	Men of Character	Marc Erickson	Senior pastor at Eastbrook Church
1998	Men of Conviction	Walter Harvey	Senior pastor at Parklawn Assembly of God
1997	Men of Courage	Patrick Morley	Chairman and CEO of Man in the Mirror Ministries
1996	Men of Action	Jeffery Johnson	
1995	No Regrets	Joe Stowell	President of Cornerstone University
1994	Kenosha		
