= Nomo =

Nomo may refer to:

== Places ==
- Nomo Peninsula, Japan

== People ==
- Hideo Nomo (born 1968), Japanese baseball pitcher
- Edouard Nomo-Ongolo, Cameroonian politician
- Bernard N'Nomo (born 1980), Cameroonian rugby union player
- Ulrich N'Nomo (born 1996), French footballer

== Other ==
- Nomo (band)
- NOMO1, protein in humans
- NoMo ("No-modern") as used in the postmodern culture jamming lexicon (See: Postinternet; Adbusters)
- No Missing Out (NOMO) british dairy free confectionery brand

== See also ==
- Nomos (disambiguation)
