= Bethesda, Wisconsin =

Unincorporated community in Wisconsin, United States

- Unincorporated community
- Location within Wisconsin Location within the United States
- Coordinates: 42°59′16″N 88°19′06″W
- Country: United States
- State: Wisconsin
- County: Waukesha
- Elevation: 843 ft (257 m)
- Time zone: UTC−6 (Central (CST))
  - Summer (DST): UTC−5 (CDT)
- Postal code: 53189
- Area code: 262
- GNIS feature ID: 1577515

Bethesda is an unincorporated community in the town of Genesee, Waukesha County, Wisconsin, United States, locaded near County Roads DE, and DT. The community was named for Bethesda Park, a spa and tourist resort built around a medicinal spring developed by Richard Dunbar in the late 1860s.
