= Jill Briscoe =

British-American author, editor, and speaker

- Born: Jill Pauline Ryder; 29 June 1935 (age 91); Liverpool, England
- Education: Homerton College, Cambridge
- Occupations: Author; editor; speaker
- Employer: Just Between Us
- Title: Executive Editor
- Board member of: World Relief; Christianity Today
- Spouse: Stuart Briscoe (m. 1958; died 2022)
- Children: 3
- Website: tellingthetruth.org

Jill Pauline Briscoe (née Ryder; born 29 June 1935) is a British–American author, editor, and speaker. She has written or co-written over 40 books and is the founder and executive Editor of Just Between Us magazine. She is a former member of the board of directors of World Relief and Christianity Today.

== Early life ==
Jill Pauline (née Ryder) Briscoe was born on 29 June 1935 in Liverpool, Lancashire, England, the daughter of William "Bill" and Margaret "Peggy" Ryder. She attended Homerton College, Cambridge, graduating with a diploma to teach in the public school system. Ryder married her husband and future writing and ministry partner, D. Stuart Briscoe, in 1958 in Liverpool.

== Career and ministry ==
=== Early career ===
Briscoe taught for three years, then served for ten years as the director of Capernwray Hall, a nursery school and Christian youth centre.

=== Christian ministries ===
==== Elmbrook Church ====
Briscoe came to the United States in 1970, when her husband became the senior pastor of Elmbrook Church, in Brookfield, Wisconsin. There she served as a member of the laity and established a youth ministry called the God Squad, while also taking the lead in the development of Elmbrook's women's ministry. She began to speak extensively all over North America.

==== Speaking and writing ====
In 2000, after her husband stepped down from his pastorate, she and her husband began working as ministers-at-large of Elmbrook Church, allowing them to travel around the world teaching pastors, missionaries, and church leaders. Briscoe has written or co-written over 40 books, ranging in genre and subject matter from scriptural studies and devotionals to poetry and children's books. She serves as a member of the teaching staff of Telling the Truth Ministries, a worldwide media ministry founded by her husband. She is the founder and executive editor of Just Between Us, a Christian women's lifestyle magazine that serves women involved in church ministry. She is a former member of the boards of directors of World Relief and Christianity Today, having served in that capacity for over 20 years.

== Personal life ==
Jill married Stuart in 1958 in Liverpool. Stuart died in 2022. The couple had three children and 13 grandchildren.

== Literature cited ==
- Briscoe, D. Stuart; Briscoe, Jill (2006). Married for Life: Growing Together Through the Differences and Surprises of Life. Downers Grove, IL: InterVarsity Press. ISBN 978-0-8308-5700-5.
