= Genesee, Wisconsin =

- Town
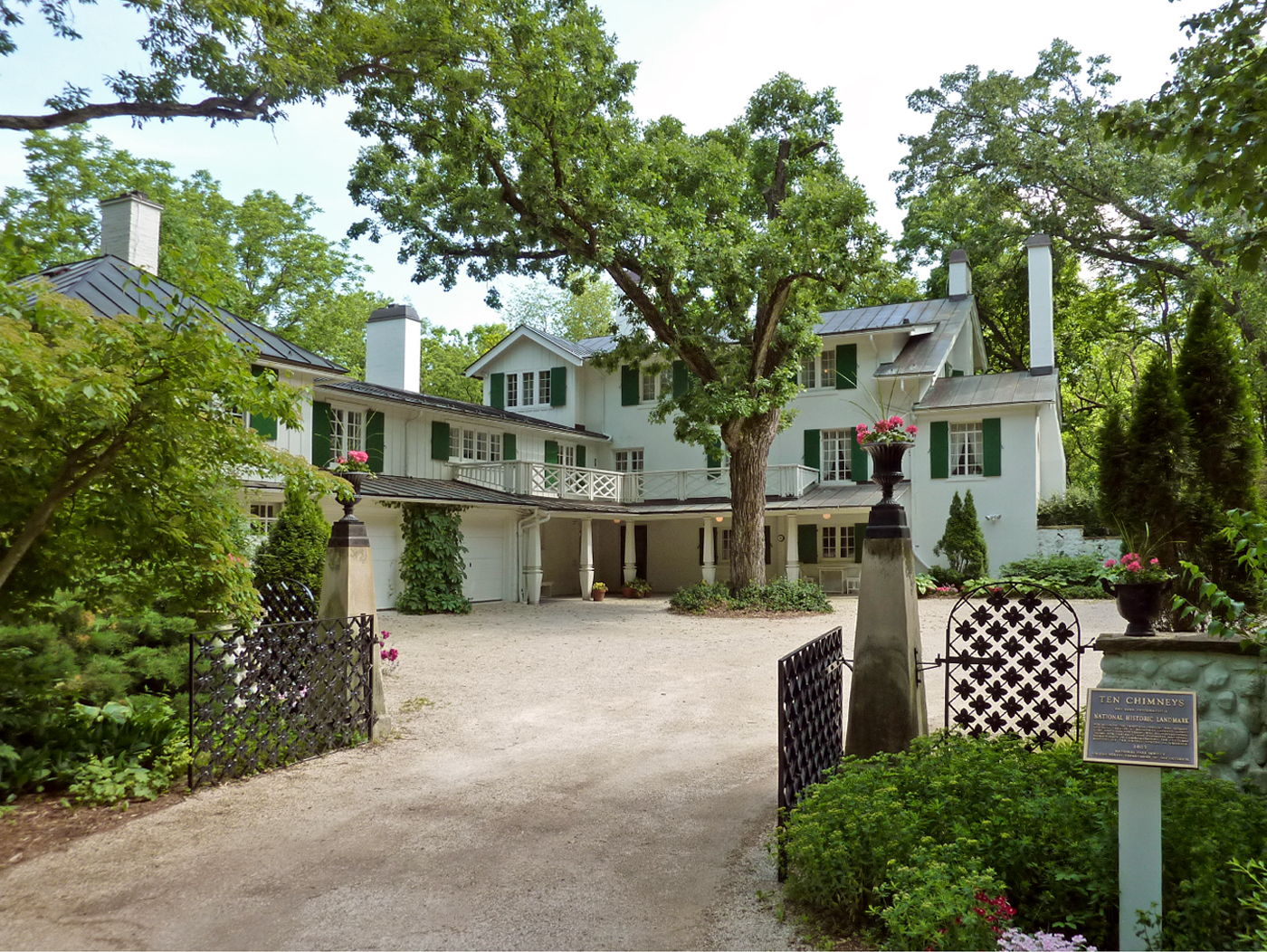
- Ten Chimneys

- Location in Waukesha County and the state of Wisconsin.
- Coordinates: 42°58′22″N 88°22′0″W
- Country: United States
- State: Wisconsin
- County: Waukesha

Area
  - Total: 32.0 sq mi (82.9 km^{2})
  - Land: 31.9 sq mi (82.6 km^{2})
  - Water: 0.12 sq mi (0.3 km^{2})
- Elevation: 896 ft (273 m)

Population (2020)
  - Total: 7,171
  - Density: 228/sq mi (88.2/km^{2})
- Time zone: UTC-6 (Central (CST))
  - Summer (DST): UTC-5 (CDT)
- Area code: 262
- FIPS code: 55-28487
- GNIS feature ID: 1583260
- Website: https://towngenesee.wi.gov/

Genesee is a town in Waukesha County, Wisconsin, United States. The population was 7,171 at the 2020 census. The unincorporated communities of Bethesda, Genesee, Genesee Depot, and Saylesville are in the town.

== Geography ==
According to the United States Census Bureau, the town has an area of 32.0 square miles (82.9 km^{2}), of which 31.9 square miles (82.6 km^{2}) is land and 0.1 square mile (0.3 km^{2}) (0.31%) is water.

== Demographics ==
Historical population
Census	Pop.	Note	%±
1980	5,126		—
1990	5,986		16.8%
2000	7,284		21.7%
2010	7,340		0.8%
2020	7,171		−2.3%

As of the census of 2000, there were 7,284 people, 2,431 households, and 2,095 families living in the town. The population density was 228.3 people per square mile (88.2/km^{2}). There were 2,481 housing units at an average density of 77.8 per square mile (30.0/km^{2}). The racial makeup of the town was 98.31% White, 0.19% African American, 0.27% Native American, 0.29% Asian, 0.04% Pacific Islander, 0.43% from other races, and 0.47% from two or more races. Hispanic or Latino of any race were 1.78% of the population.

There were 2,431 households, out of which 42.9% had children under the age of 18 living with them, 79.4% were married couples living together, 4.6% had a female householder with no husband present, and 13.8% were non-families. 10.0% of all households were made up of individuals, and 2.8% had someone living alone who was 65 years of age or older. The average household size was 3.00 and the average family size was 3.24.

In the town, the population was spread out, with 29.5% under the age of 18, 6.0% from 18 to 24, 28.8% from 25 to 44, 29.1% from 45 to 64, and 6.5% who were 65 years of age or older. The median age was 39 years. For every 100 females, there were 102.8 males. For every 100 females age 18 and over, there were 102.0 males.

The median income for a household in the town was $78,740, and the median income for a family was $83,842. Males had a median income of $51,084 versus $32,582 for females. The per capita income for the town was $31,028. About 0.7% of families and 0.8% of the population were below the poverty line, including 0.4% of those under age 18 and none of those age 65 or over.

== Landmarks ==
Ten Chimneys, the home of Alfred Lunt and Lynn Fontanne, is located in Genesee.

== Notable people ==
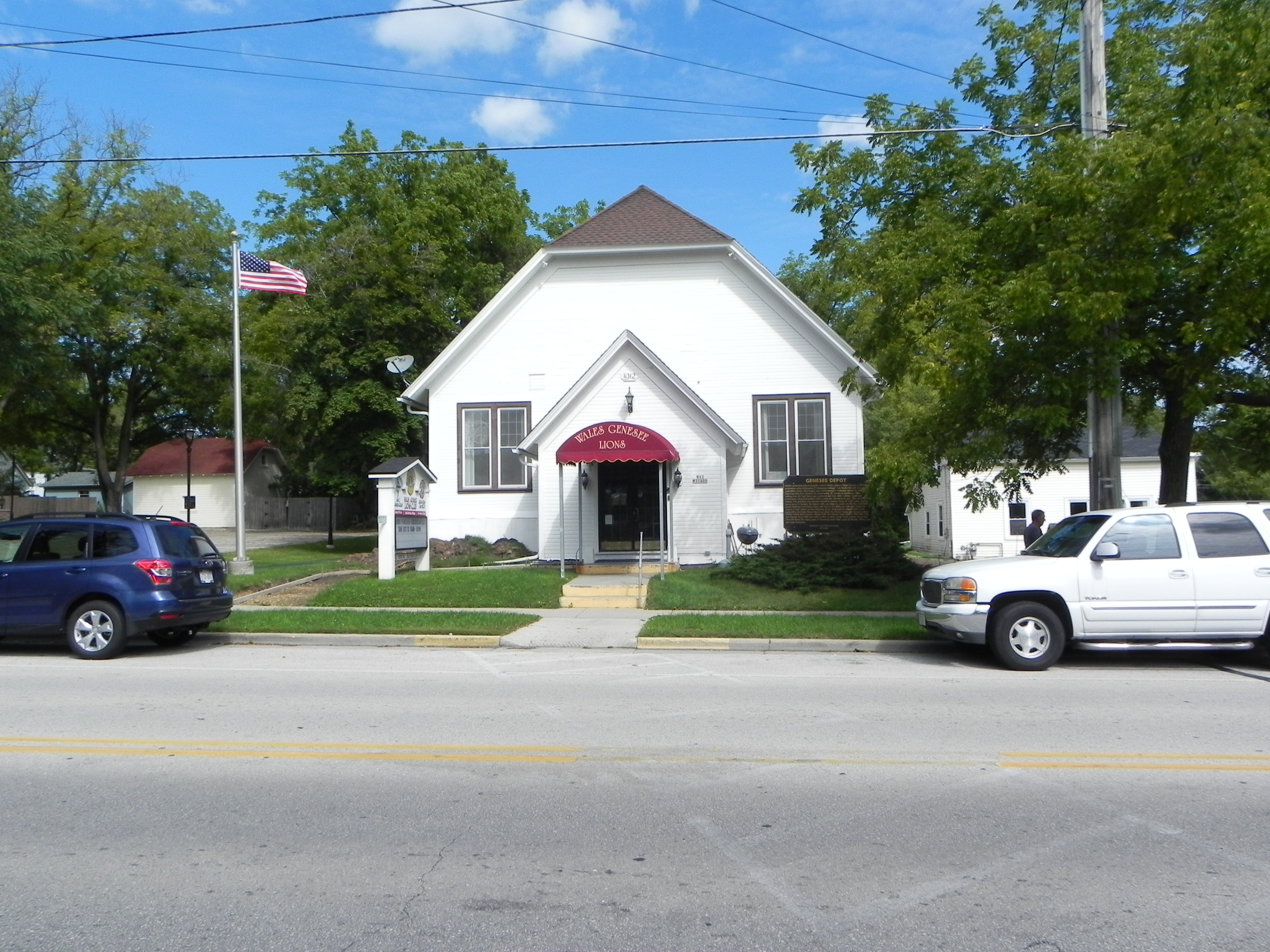
Genesee Town Hall, September 2014

- Evan G. Davies, Wisconsin legislator, was born in the town
- Pitts Ellis, Wisconsin legislator, lived in the town
- William Henry Hardy, Wisconsin legislator, lived in the town
- Phil H. Jones, Wisconsin legislator, was born in the town
- Ray David Owen, scientist and educator, was born in the town

== See also ==
- List of towns in Wisconsin
