= Genesee (community), Wisconsin =

Genesee, Wisconsin
- Unincorporated community
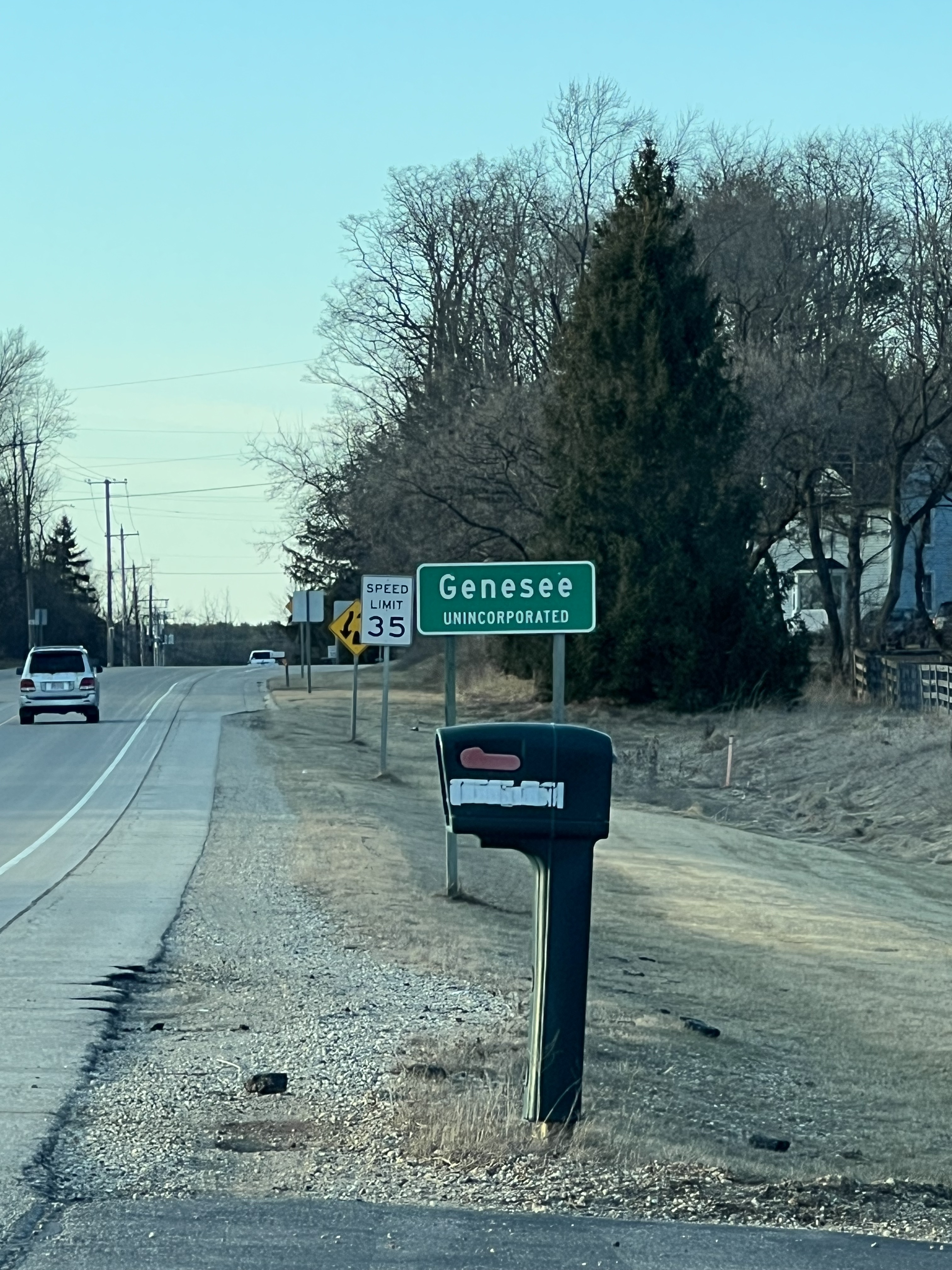

- Location within Wisconsin Location within the United States
- Coordinates: 42°57′10″N 88°21′32″W
- Country: United States
- State: Wisconsin
- County: Waukesha
- Elevation: 892 ft (272 m)
- Time zone: UTC-6 (Central (CST))
  - Summer (DST): UTC-5 (CDT)
- Area code: 262
- GNIS feature ID: 1565456

Genesee (also Jenkinsville) is an unincorporated community located in the town of Genesee, Waukesha County, Wisconsin, United States. Wisconsin State Highways 59 and 83 intersect in Genesee.
