= David L. Dancey =

American judge

David Lloyd Dancey (July 2, 1917 – March 8, 2008) was an American politician and jurist.

Born in Waukesha, Wisconsin, Dancey graduated from Waukesha High School. He then received his bachelor's degree from Carroll University in 1938 and his law degree from University of Wisconsin Law School in 1941. During World War II, Dancey served in the United States Navy where he had repaired radios and was an instructor of radio mechanics for the United States Army Air Forces. In 1947, Dancey served in the Wisconsin State Assembly as a Republican. From 1948 to 1952, Dancey served as district attorney of Waukesha County, Wisconsin. Then from 1958 until 1990, Dancey served as Wisconsin Circuit Court judge for Waukesha County and then as reserved court judge until 1997. Dancey died in Waukesha, Wisconsin.
