= William Henry Hardy =

American politician

William Henry Hardy (15/16 October 1831 – 20 December 1909) was a member of the Wisconsin State Assembly.

== Biography ==
Hardy was born on October 15, 1831. He attended what was then Carroll College.

== Career ==
Hardy was a member of the Assembly during the 1874 and 1876 sessions. Additionally, he chaired the town board (similar to city council) and was Town Clerk, Town Treasurer and Town Superintendent of Schools of Genesee, Wisconsin. He was a Democrat.
