= Shari Dunn =

American executive, journalist, and writer

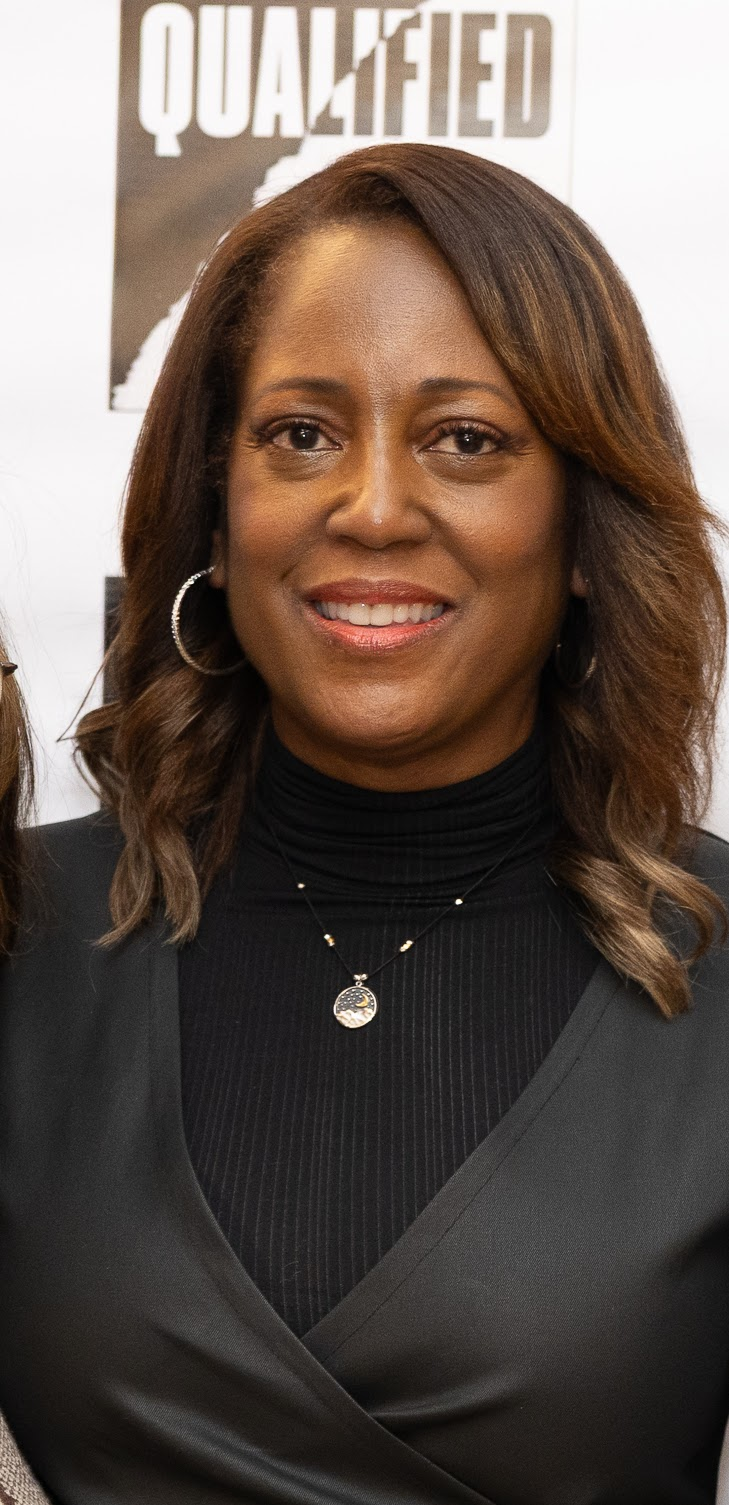
- Dunn in 2025
- Born: Shari Dunn; 1968 (age 57–58); Milwaukee, Wisconsin, U.S.
- Education: Marquette University (BA); Northwestern University Pritzker School of Law (JD)
- Occupations: Non-profit executive; Journalist; Writer
- Years active: 1990s–present
- Employers: ITBOM, LLC (principal & CEO); Dress For Success Oregon (former); WDJT-TV (former)
- Known for: Workplace equity, media, and public policy advocacy
- Notable work: Qualified: How Competency Checking and Race Collide at Work (2025, HarperCollins)
- Title: Principal and CEO, ITBOM, LLC
- Awards: Associated Press Award – Spot News; Wisconsin Broadcasters Association Award – Best Morning News Show; Portland Business Journal Executive of the Year (2018); Portland Business Journal Women of Influence (2019)
- Website: thesharidunn.com

Shari Dunn (born 1968) is an American non-profit executive, journalist, and writer. She is the author of Qualified: How Competency Checking and Race Collide at Work (2025), and is known for her work in workplace equity, media, and public policy.

== Early life and education ==
Dunn was born in Milwaukee, Wisconsin, to Harry Dunn Jr. and Leola (Staples) Dunn. Her mother, Leola, was a descendant of Mound Bayou, Mississippi, one of the country's first all-Black towns, founded by formerly enslaved people. Leola was also the first cousin once removed of Pops Staples of the Staples singers.

Shari grew up in a working-class African American neighborhood of Milwaukee and attended Nicolet High School in Glendale, Wisconsin as part of the Chapter 220 program, a racial integration plan that saw primarily Black children bussed to suburban schools. Later, she attended Marquette University, where she earned a Bachelor of Arts degree in philosophy. She went on to receive her Juris Doctor from the Northwestern University's Pritzker School of Law.

== Career ==
After completing law school, Dunn began her career as an attorney, primarily representing victims of domestic violence for approximately ten years. She later worked in Washington, D.C., as the Senior Attorney in the Civil Division, developing training and program services for the National Legal Aid and Defender Association. During this time, she engaged in policy and advocacy activities, including educating legislators and their staff on funding for the Legal Services Corporation (LSC) and other issues related to access to funding for Legal Aid Law Firms. Dunn worked on the reauthorization of the Violence Against Women Act (VAWA) to ensure that legal services providers would continue to receive funding to provide vital services. Dunn went on to become the vice president of Power of Attorney, Inc., a subsidiary foundation of Atlantic Philanthropies, managing a multi-million-dollar grant to strengthen civil legal services for nonprofits.

In the mid-2000s, Dunn's career shifted direction after she appeared as a guest on The Oprah Winfrey Show and won $125,000 on the game show Who Wants to Be a Millionaire, experiences that prompted her to transition into a media-focused career.

Dunn began working in broadcast journalism, initially freelancing for Court TV and then reporting for an NBC affiliate in Tyler, Texas. She went on to spend a decade as a television news reporter working freelance in Los Angeles and as an anchor and reporter in Texas, and her hometown of Milwaukee. In 2009, Dunn became the morning news anchor at WDJT-TV (CBS 58) in Milwaukee. She received multiple awards for her journalism work, including the Associated Press Award for Spot News and the Wisconsin Broadcasters Association Award for Best Morning News Show.

In 2013, while working for Channel 58, Dunn interviewed activist, singer, and actor Harry Belafonte, who was the featured guest at the YWCA's 9th Annual Promoting Racial Justice Program.

In 2015, Dunn transitioned to the nonprofit sector as the executive director of Dress for Success Oregon, an organization focused on women's employment and empowerment. During her tenure, Dress for Success Oregon expanded its workforce development programs, initiated a coding training program for women, secured the first large-scale government reimbursement contract to support job seekers on public assistance, and expanded with new satellite offices in the region.

In 2018, the Portland Business Journal named Dunn Executive of the Year for her contributions to Dress for Success. The following year, she was recognized as one of the publication's Women of Influence. Concurrently, Dunn served as an adjunct instructor in nonprofit management within the University of Portland's MBA program.

In 2020, Dunn founded ITBOM, LLC, a consulting and training firm, where she currently serves as Principal and CEO.

Dunn has been involved in community and philanthropic initiatives. She served on the board of the Women's Foundation of Oregon, Friends of the Columbia Gorge, Period, and was appointed by Governor Kate Brown to the Oregon Workforce Investment Board, contributing to state workforce policy. She is also a fellow of the American Leadership Forum.

Dunn has also been interviewed or appeared on Matter of Fact with Soledad O'Brien, NBC News Daily, and the Whitney Reynolds Show on PBS.

== Writing ==
Dunn is the author of Qualified: How Competency Checking and Race Collide at Work, published by HarperCollins in 2025. The book examines biases faced by Black and other people of color in the workplace regarding perceptions of their qualifications. Dunn introduces the term "competency checking," describing the persistent, often subconscious scrutiny that people of color experience to continually prove their competence in professional settings. The book has been reviewed by Book Riot and Publishers Weekly.

Dunn has written for and been cited by Fortune, Salon, The Hill, The Wall Street Journal, Ad Age, Bloomberg News, and TIME on workplace equity.
