= Konstance Knox =

American virologist and entrepreneur (born 1955)

Konstance K. Knox
- Born: October 14, 1955 (age 70); Wisconsin, US
- Education: Marquette (BS; Medical Laboratory Sciences 1977), Cardinal Stritch (MA; Business Management 1990), Medical College of Wisconsin(PhD; Experimental Pathology 1994), St. Luke's Medical Center Milwaukee(Post Doctoral Fellowship)
- Known for: Co-founder Viracor., Early work on multiple sclerosis.
- Scientific career
- Fields: Virology, Laboratory Economics, Biotechnology Entrepreneur

Konstance K. Knox (born October 14, 1955) is an American virologist and entrepreneur who founded Coppe Laboratories, Viracor, the Wisconsin Viral Research Group (WVRG) and Viracor's Institute for Viral Pathogenesis (IVP). In 2000, Viracor became the first biotechnology company in the United States to correlate multiple sclerosis with human herpesvirus 6 (HHV-6).

== Contributions to HHV-6 Understanding ==
Knox was first to identify human herpesvirus-6 (HHV-6) as a cause of acute and subacute encephalitis in immunocompromised individuals.

Knox was first to identify human herpesvirus-6 (HHV-6) as a cause of pneumonitis in immunocompromised individuals.

Knox was first to identify human herpesvirus-6 (HHV-6) as a serious pathogen in immunocompromised individuals causing or contributing to immune suppression and immune dysregulation.

== Biography ==
Born and raised in Wisconsin, Knox received her bachelor's degree in medical laboratory sciences from Marquette University and was board certified by the American Society for Clinical Pathology in 1977. After receiving a master's degree in business management in 1990, Knox entered the Medical College of Wisconsin's graduate pathology program as a doctoral student in 1992, where she investigated the pathogenetic interactions between HIV and HHV-6 as her doctoral dissertation research project under Donald Carrigan with whom she collaborated on various publications during the period. She received her PhD in 1994.

== Founding Viracor ==
In 1996 Knox and Carrigan founded the Wisconsin Viral Research Group (WVRG), located in the Milwaukee County Research Park. In 2000 they incorporated Viracor as a spinoff of WVRG and hired Phillip Short as the founding CEO to manage business aspect of Viracor in exchange of a minority stake, according to Milwaukee County records. Viracor grew revenues to more than $25 million per year by 2008 with more than 100 employees. In summer of 2009 Viracor was acquired by IBT Labs for US$44 Million in cash and a further unspecified amount of stock. By 2014, Viracor-IBT Laboratories was valued at US$255 Million, when it was acquired by Eurofins Scientific Group. As Viracor expanded Knox focused on WVRG and expanded research outside United States. Through WVRG, Knox collaborates with various research and philanthropic organizations to offer free research grants and develop research institutes. Knox also runs the not-for-profit Institute for Viral Pathogenesis (IVP), which has successfully obtained research grants from major funding organizations for virological studies in patients with multiple sclerosis and chronic fatigue syndrome.

== Recognition ==
Knox was named fifth of the 50 most innovative AIDS researchers in the United States in 1996 by POZ magazine in its "Survey of the American Scientific Landscape". In their recognition, survey authors Bob Lederer and Patrick Pacheco said Knox calls HHV-6 variant A "a big, dumb brute destroyer of tissue," which she and Carrigan had in their crosshairs. The National CFIDS Foundation (NCF) awarded its largest research grant to Knox, for “The Potential Role of New Infectious Agents in Chronic Fatigue Syndrome”. NCF medical director Alan Cocchetto said that Knox and her partner had assisted the NCF with previous projects that included research into the roles of HHV-6A/B and HTLV-II in CFS/ME. Knox's work on the role of human herpesvirus six (HHV-6) in chronic diseases also led her to be named the 1995 Distinguished Alumna of the Program in Medical Laboratory Sciences at Marquette University. Her work was named as the Outstanding Doctoral Dissertation in 1995 by the Medical College of Wisconsin. Knox has served as a special reviewer for the National Prion Research Program of the National Institutes of Health and has served as a peer reviewer for several journals and funding agencies. She is a member of the American Society for Microbiology, the Infectious Diseases Society of America, American Association for the Advancement of Science (AAAS), and the Pan American Society for Clinical Virology. She has served on the scientific advisory board of the International Association for Chronic Fatigue Syndrome and also serves as a member of the scientific advisory board of the Wisconsin ME/CSF Foundation.
