= Elmbrook Church - Lake Country =

Coordinates: 43°03′47.7″N 88°21′57.8″W

Elmbrook Church
- Elmbrook Church
- Location: 1100 HWY 83 Hartland, WI 53029
- Country: United States
- Denomination: Non-Denominational, Evangelical Christian
- Website: Elmbrook Church

History
- Founded: 1983

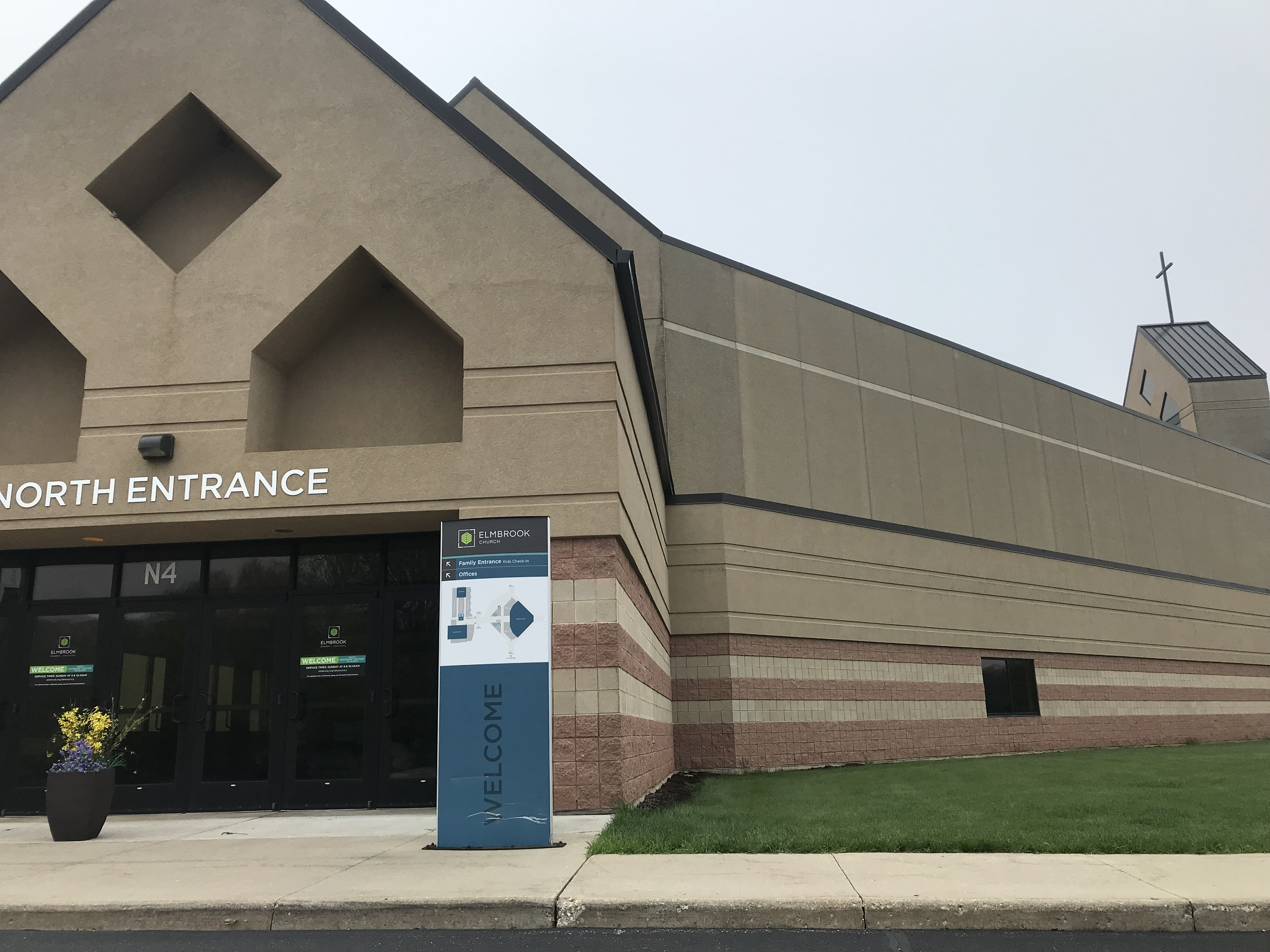

Elmbrook Church - Lake Country is a non-denominational, Evangelical Christian church located in Hartland, Wisconsin, a suburb of Milwaukee. The church is autonomous and independent of any denominational control.

== History ==
Elmbrook Lake Country began in 1981 as a church plant called Westbrook Church. Several small neighborhood groups of people who attended Elmbrook Church in Brookfield began holding worship services on Sunday evenings at Cushing School in Delafield with average attendance between 25 and 30 people. In 1982 slow growth had leaders set to hold Westbrook's final service due to low attendance. However, seventy-five people who wanted to know when the church would be started showed up, saving the church. In 1983 Westbrook was officially born as a church plant of Elmbrook, and worship services were held at Delafield Town Hall. Also that year, International Ministries was founded with the mission “to know Christ and to make Him known”. In 1985 Westbrook started meeting at the Walmart Center strip mall in Delafield and began supporting their first four missionary families. In 1986 the church supported eight missionary families.

In 1988 the church purchased the 25-acre (100,000 m^{2}) cornfield in Hartland where the church is currently located and added an associate pastor. In 1989 growth led to a second worship service being added, services moved once again to Wales Elementary School, and Westbrook hired its first youth pastor. In 1993 Westbrook broke ground on Phase I of its new campus and temporarily moved yet again to Kettle Moraine High School. In 1994 Phase I was completed and the church moved into its first permanent building, with worship services held in the gym. By 1996 the congregation had doubled in size since moving into the new facility. In 1999 plans began for adding a worship center and additional classrooms. In 2002 the debt on Phase I was retired allowing construction to be planned for Phase II. In 2005 Phase II was completed, consisting of a new 1,000 seat worship center. In 2008, Scott Grabendike became the new lead pastor of Westbrook.

In May 2016, the congregations of Elmbrook Church and Westbrook Church voted to merge into a single, multi-site congregation. The Westbrook Church site was renamed “Elmbrook Church-Lake Country”.
