= Michele Palermo =

American dramatist

Michele Palermo is an American playwright, actress, producer, and director.

== Education ==
Palermo graduated with a degree in Theater Arts from Marquette University, attended the Drama Studio London, and received her MA in International Communications for American University.

== Career ==
Palermo has been actively writing, producing, and acting in her own works for the entirety of her career. She also spent four years as Chief of Staff and Head Speechwriter for First Lady of Virginia Lisa Collis Warner, wife of Democratic Senator Mark R. Warner. While she has credits as a staff writer from a variety of television shows, including head writer on Martha Stewart Living, she has penned a number of pilots described as "The Greatest TV Pilots Never Made". She currently teaches screenwriting at Columbia University.

=== Plays ===
- A New York Minute
- Ladies in Waiting
- Labor Pains
- The Other Half
- Legacy: The Story of a Family
- The Sisters Three

== Filmography ==
=== Television ===
- Boy Meets World (1 Episode, "Turnaround")
- Martha Stewart Living (Head Writer)
- Blind Faith (One-Hour Pilot)
- Lions (One-Hour Pilot, UK)
- The Mansion – One-Hour Pilot for LIFETIME, developed with Nancy Cotton and Larry Gilbert for Icon Productions.
- Capitol Steps (One-Hour Pilot developed by Peter Horton)

=== Film ===
- Ladies in Waiting - Madeleine
- Unreel: The True Hollywood Story (Short Film)

=== Web Content ===
Chapin Circle (Web Series, 5 Episodes)
