= Kate Klise =

American writer (born 1963)

- Born: April 13, 1963 (age 63); Peoria, Illinois
- Education: Marquette University
- Occupation: Writer
- Writing career
- Period: 1998–present
- Genre: Children's literature
- Notable works: Regarding the Fountain (1998 debut novel); 43 Old Cemetery Road series (from 2009)
- Website: kateklise.com

Catherine "Kate" Klise (born April 13, 1963) is an American writer known for children's fiction. Many of her books are illustrated by her sister, M. Sarah Klise. Their popular Regarding series is presented in a scrapbook format, with letters, journal entries, and related ephemera telling the story. She is also known for her picture books as well as the bestselling 43 Old Cemetery Road series. Klise's first adult novel, In the Bag, was released in 2012. She is a contributor to The Huffington Post.

== Life and career ==
Klise was the fourth of six children born to educational film producer Thomas and Marjorie Klise. Raised in Peoria, Illinois, she attended Marquette University and spent fifteen years working as a correspondent for People magazine. She lives near Norwood, Missouri (from no later than 2007 apparently) – on "a 40-acre farm in the Missouri Ozarks", she says in 2016. Her Huffington Post blog is subtitled "Writer and hiker".

Klise has identified E. B. White as one influence.

== Books ==
=== Children's books ===
==== Regarding series ====
- Regarding the Fountain, 1998
- Regarding the Sink, 2004
- Regarding the Trees, 2005
- Regarding the Bathrooms, 2006
- Regarding the Bees, 2007

==== 43 Old Cemetery Road series ====
- Dying to Meet You, 2009
- Over My Dead Body, 2009
- Till Death Do Us Bark, 2011
- The Phantom of the Post Office, 2012
- Hollywood, Dead Ahead, 2013
- Greetings from the Graveyard, 2014
- The Loch Ness Punster, 2015

==== Three-Ring Rascals series ====
- The Show Must Go On!, 2013
- The Greatest Star on Earth, 2014
- The Circus Goes to Sea, 2014
- Pop Goes the Circus!, 2015
- Secrets of the Circus, 2016

==== Standalone Books ====
- Letters from Camp, 1999
- Trial by Journal, 2001
- Shall I Knit You a Hat?, 2004
- Why Do You Cry?, 2006
- Imagine Harry, 2007, with M. Sarah Klise
- Little Rabbit and the Night Mare, 2008, with M. Sarah Klise
- Little Rabbit and the Meanest Mother on Earth, 2010, with M. Sarah Klise
- Stand Straight, Ella Kate: The True Story of a Real Giant, 2010
- Grammy Lamby and the Secret Handshake, 2012
- Stay: A Girl, a Dog, a Bucket List, 2017
- Don't Check Out This Book!, 2020
- Mystery on Magnolia Circle, 2021

=== Novels ===
- Deliver Us from Normal, 2005
- Far From Normal, 2006
- Grounded, 2010
- In the Bag, 2012
- Homesick, 2012
