= Tommy Cronin =

American football player (1896–1964)

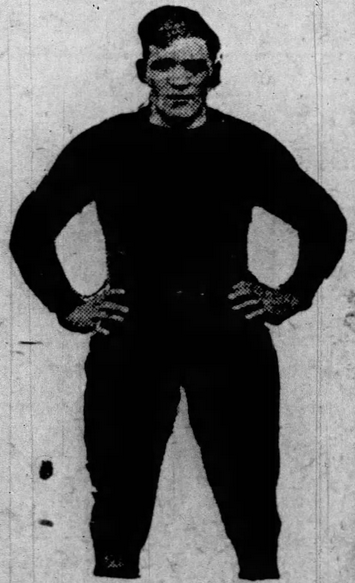
- Cronin, c. 1922

No. 3
- Position: Halfback

Personal information
- Born: April 29, 1896; Janesville, Wisconsin, U.S.
- Died: April 24, 1964 (aged 67); Janesville, Wisconsin, U.S.
- Listed height: 5 ft 9 in (1.75 m)
- Listed weight: 170 lb (77 kg)

Career information
- High school: Janesville
- College: Dubuque (1916); Marquette (1919–1921)

Career history
- Green Bay Packers (1922); Ironwood Legion (1923)

Career statistics
- Games played: 4 or 5
- Games started: 1
- Touchdowns: 1
- Stats at Pro Football Reference

Thomas Vincent Cronin (April 29, 1896 – April 24, 1964) was an American professional football player who was a halfback in the National Football League (NFL). He played college football for the Dubuque Duhawks and Marquette Golden Avalanche and later played one season in the NFL with the Green Bay Packers in 1922. After his playing career, he served as a high school football coach, a dairy businessman and a civic leader in Janesville, Wisconsin.

== Early life ==
Cronin, who was of Irish descent, was born on April 29, 1896, in Janesville, Wisconsin. He attended Janesville High School where he played both football and basketball; he and Moxie Dalton, who also played professionally in 1922, remained the only alumni of Janesville to ever play in the NFL until Keeanu Benton in 2023. The Janesville Weekly Gazette described him as one "of the classiest basketball players who ever donned a high school uniform."

== College career ==
After high school, Cronin began attending Dubuque College (now Loras College). He played college football for the Dubuque football team in 1916 and was described as their "wonderful little [halfback]," while he "won applause with his long end runs and open field footwork," according to the Gazette. He helped Dubuque win the conference championship and was named second-team all-conference at right halfback.

After the 1916 season, Cronin was drafted to serve in World War I; while serving in the military, he played for the 1917 Camp Grant football team. He served overseas and had returned to the U.S. by March 1919. He enrolled at Marquette University in Milwaukee, Wisconsin, later that year, and became a starter for the Marquette Golden Avalanche football team. In addition to football, Cronin also played basketball for Marquette.

Cronin was the "star halfback" for Marquette from 1919 to 1921. The Journal Times noted that he was "considered one of the fastest men in middle west collegiate football" during his stint with the Golden Avalanche. He played his final game for Marquette against Wabash in 1921 and was the star player of the game, despite having been advised to stay out due to injuries, with the Gazette noting "he put everything he had into it." After the 1921 season, he played a game for the Marquette All-Stars, composed of top former players for the Golden Avalanche, against the professional Beloit Fairies.

== Professional career ==
In December 1921, after Cronin graduated from college, he signed a contract to play basketball for the Lakota Cardinals as a guard. In 1922, he signed to play professional football for the Green Bay Packers of the NFL. He made the team and played as a backup halfback during the 1922 season. A November report in The Journal Times noted that "This is Cronin's first year in a Green Bay uniform but he already has made a name for himself ... Cronin fights every minute he is in the game and he doesn't know what 'quit' means." He caught a touchdown pass from Curly Lambeau in the team's game against the Rock Island Independents and finished the season having appeared in four or five (Note: Sources conflict.) games, one as a starter. The 1922 Packers compiled a record of 4–3–3 and placed seventh in the NFL.

In October 1923, Cronin signed to play for the independent Ironwood Legion, where he spent the remainder of the 1923 season. According to the Green Bay Press-Gazette, he distinguished himself at Ironwood with his "brilliant play."

== Later life and death ==
In 1924, Cronin was named the head football coach at Ironwood High School in Michigan. He also later served as a high school coach in Milwaukee. He then returned to his hometown of Janesville where he worked for his family's dairy business, Cronin Dairy Company, which was later Pure Milk Company. He served as owner of his family's business before retiring in 1952. Cronin was also a civic leader, chairing the Rock County Board and serving as a member of the board from 1932 to 1952 and then from 1960 to 1963. He was a member of the Knights of Columbus, serving as grand knight for the Carroll Council 596, and was a member of the Elks Lodge in Janesville.

With his wife, Marion, Cronin had two daughters. He died in Janesville on April 24, 1964, at the age of 67, after a short illness.
