= Mel Lawrenz =

Mel Lawrenz is the former senior pastor and current Minister-at-Large of Elmbrook Church in Brookfield, Wisconsin. He began serving at Elmbrook in 1980 and the church currently averages 6,000 people in attendance per week, making it one of the 100-largest churches in the United States Lawrenz became the senior pastor of Elmbrook in 2000 after serving under former senior pastor Stuart Briscoe's leadership for twenty years and resigned in 2010.

He received his B.A. in English from Carroll University, his Master of Divinity from Trinity Evangelical Divinity School, and his Ph.D. in historical theology from Marquette University. He is the author of thirteen books.

On April 18, 2009, Lawrenz announced that he would be stepping down as senior pastor in 2010, to serve as Elmbrook's third Minister-at-Large. He transitioned into the Minister-at-Large role in early 2010, developing resources and networks for leaders through The Brook Network.
