= Phil H. Jones =

American politician

Phil H. Jones (February 9, 1874 – ) was a member of the Wisconsin State Assembly.

== Biography ==
Jones was born on February 9, 1874, in Genesee, Wisconsin. Later, he would reside on a farm in Delafield (town), Wisconsin. In 1894, Jones graduated from what was then Carroll College. During the Spanish–American War, he served with the United States Army.

== Political career ==
Jones was elected to the Assembly in 1910. Other positions he held include member of the board of supervisors of Delafield. He was a Republican.
