= Susan Bird =

Founder and CEO of Wf360

- Education: Stanford Law School
- Occupation(s): CEO of Wf360; Attorney; Author

Susan Willett Bird is the founder and CEO of Wf360. She is also an attorney, author, and specialist in executive level marketing and business networks. Wf360 using its trademarked process Brandversation, was launched in 1999 and works with major corporations to sustain relationships with senior decision makers and customers.

Bird received her law degree from Stanford Law School, where she was member of Stanford Law Review.

Bird is a Founding Member and former Chair of the Committee of 200; a member of the Women’s Leadership Board at Harvard Kennedy School; a member of the International Women's Forum and a member of the International Council for the Kilby International Awards.

Bird is the author of Smart Talk: the ABC's of Authentic Conversation and a co-author of The Age of Conversation.
