= Arthur Olszyk =

American journalist

Arthur L. Olszyk (1923–1996) was a pioneer in Milwaukee television news.

Olszyk was born in Milwaukee in 1923. He graduated from Pulaski High School and afterward studied journalism at Marquette University. Immediately after graduation from Marquette in 1944, Olszyk began his career in broadcast journalism at WTMJ-AM. He remained with WTMJ, working in both radio and in television at WTMJ-TV, until his retirement in 1980. Olszyk received the By-Line Award from Marquette's School of Journalism in 1978, and in 1987 was inducted into the Milwaukee Press Club Hall of Fame. After retirement from WTMJ Olszyk taught broadcast journalism at Marquette University for seven years until his second retirement in 1987. Arthur Olszyk died on November 29, 1996, at age 73.

Olszyk began his career in television news before many people even knew about the medium. Some the earliest TV shows he produced were the weekly program Around Town, which was launched in 1948; Milwaukee Newsreel, in the 1950s; and the later daily documentaries, Special Assignment.

While at WTMJ Olszyk served as assistant news editor under Jack Krueger from 1953 to 1963. Promoted to news editor for WTMJ-TV in 1963, he remained at that position until his retirement. In 1993 he published the book, Live At the Scene: Local TV News in Milwaukee, 1944–1980.
