= Elmbrook Church =

Coordinates: 43.022757°N 88.169368°W

- Elmbrook Church
- Country: United States
- Denomination: Non-denominational
- Website: elmbrook.org

Elmbrook Church is a non-denominational, evangelical Christian megachurch located in the Milwaukee suburb of Brookfield, Wisconsin, in Waukesha County. Since the church's founding in 1958, it has become one of the largest churches in the United States. Weekly church attendance averages 7,000, making it the largest church in Wisconsin and one of the 100-largest churches in the United States.

== History ==
The church was founded in 1958 as the First Baptist Church of Brookfield, when 30 Christians met at Leland Elementary School in Elm Grove. The next year, Elmbrook called its first salaried pastor, Ted Anderson. In 1963, Pastor Bob Hobson was called to lead the church and the name was changed to Elmbrook Baptist Church. The following year, the church moved into its first building on Calhoun Road, in Brookfield. In 1966 the church built a 450-seat sanctuary and attendance increased from 300 to 700 by 1970. In 1968, the pastoral staff grew to two persons, a second morning service and evening service were added, and the church dropped the Baptist affiliation and officially became Elmbrook Church.

In 1970, Evangelist Stuart Briscoe was called by the church leadership to be its new senior pastor, upon the resignation of Bob Hobson. Briscoe had been serving with Capernwray Missionary Fellowship of Torchbearers, in Carnforth, England and had originally come to Elmbrook to preach at a series of meetings. In 1972, rapid growth led to Elmbrook using the Ruby Isle Theater for its second service. In 1973, Elmbrook purchased 39 acres (160,000 m^{2}) for $100,000 at 777 South Barker Road, in Brookfield, and began construction on a new facility. In 1975, the first service was held in a new 1,380-seat sanctuary, the pastoral staff grew to six, and a second Sunday morning service was added with a Saturday evening service beginning in 1977. A third Sunday service was added in 1979.

In 1982, the south wing classrooms and staff offices were added and the sanctuary was expanded. In 1984, Briscoe's messages began to be telecast on Sundays on WISN-TV in Milwaukee. In 1988, the West Wing Activity Center, which included a gymnasium and classrooms, was added. With weekly church attendance exceeding 5,000, in 1992, construction began on a 3,400-seat Worship Center (completed in 1994) and educational wing. At the time, Elmbrook had 18 pastors, 3,200 members, and supported 150 missionaries. Several construction projects were completed in 1996: the 3rd floor education addition, Amphitheater and remodelled Chapel (the old sanctuary), Resource Library, Garden of Readin’ bookstore, Fellowship Hall and Kitchen, with 7,000 adults attending each week, 20 pastors on staff, and 3,600 members.

In 1998, Elmbrook celebrated its 40th anniversary. The next year, a live, 10:45 am Sunday morning radio broadcast of worship services was added. In 2000, the church Plaza was completed, Stuart Briscoe retired as senior pastor, and his protégé, Mel Lawrenz, was installed as his successor. Stuart and Jill Briscoe were commissioned international ministers-at-large. In 2004, the International Center was established, a third Sunday service was added, and an 8:00 am live Sunday radio broadcast was added. In 2008, a grass activities area and the Mission Cafe coffee shop opened.

In addition, the church has planted nine churches in the Milwaukee area: Eastbrook Church (1979), Hmong Alliance Church (1982), Lao Christian Church (1982), Westbrook Church (1983), Northbrook Church (1985), Meadowbrook Church (1989), Southbrook Church (1997), Centrobrook Church (1998), and Metrobrook Church (2005). Elmbrook also has global church partnerships with: Glennabey Church (Northern Ireland), Iglesia de LaPuerta Abierta (Buenos Aires, Argentina), Nairobi Chapel (Nairobi, Kenya), Covenant Evangelical Free Church (Singapore) and Jerusalem Alliance Church (Jerusalem, Israel).

The church celebrated its 50th anniversary in 2008. In early 2010, Lawrenz resigned to become Elmbrook's third Minister-at-Large and then associate pastor, Scott Arbeiter, was appointed lead pastor while a search was underway for Lawrenz's successor.

Following Lawrenz stepping down from the role of senior pastor, Elmbrook began looking internally and externally for senior pastor candidates. On October 10, 2010, the church announced that Philip Griffin had been selected as Elmbrook's fifth senior pastor until 2013. Scott Arbeiter acted as senior pastor as the search for a new senior pastor was conducted. Jason Webb was commissioned as the new senior pastor in October 2014. Pastor Jason was a member of Elmbrook's pastoral staff years earlier, then left to lead the launch of Brooklife Church in Mukwonago, Wisconsin. After successfully launching and leading Brooklife, he accepted the commission to become Elmbrook Church's senior pastor. Pastor Jason resigned in 2018, citing "multiple marital infidelities” and an unspecified but “serious addiction.”

In May 2016, the congregations of Elmbrook Church and Westbrook Church voted to merge into a single, multi-site congregation. The Westbrook Church site was renamed "Elmbrook Church-Lake Country".

Currently, Elmbrook has 15 pastors on staff, more than 100 employees and supports over 100 missionaries all over the world, while averaging 6,000 people in attendance per week.

Locally, Elmbrook Church has partnerships with James Place, a community outreach in Waukesha and Milwaukee, Wisconsin; BASICS; Community Warehouse; Feed My Sheep food and hospitality ministry; Fellowship of Christian Athletes (FCA); Hope Street; and Strong Links. Elmbrook also currently supports dozens of missionaries and mission organizations around the world and its yearly Harvestfest allows the congregation a chance to engage with its mission initiatives.

Globally, Elmbrook has partnerships with House of Hope in Nicaragua, Potter's House in Guatemala, The Harbor in Russia, Hope School in South Sudan, Friends for Health, World Relief-Haiti, and The Congo Initiative.

In Nov. 2018, the Council of Elders called Lee Heyward to begin serving as the Lead Pastor.

== Stuart Briscoe ==
Former pastor Stuart Briscoe was called as senior pastor of Elmbrook in 1970 after a banking career in England and an international preaching ministry under the auspices of the Torchbearers. During his pastorate Elmbrook grew tremendously and planted a number of churches in the local area while Briscoe continued his international teaching ministry. He has written more than 40 books and the media ministry, Telling the Truth, which he founded in 1971, continues to reach out daily around the world.

In 2000, after serving for 30 years as Elmbrook's senior pastor, Stuart and his wife, Jill, embarked on new ministries as Elmbrook's Ministers-at-Large, concentrating on reaching out to pastors, missionaries and church leaders all over the world, while maintaining close ties with Elmbrook, their home church. Briscoe is credited with transforming Elmbrook from a church of a few hundred people to one of the largest in the country.

== Mel Lawrenz ==
Briscoe's protégé, Mel Lawrenz, was the senior pastor of Elmbrook from 2000 to 2010, after serving under Briscoe's leadership for 20 years. He began serving at the church in 1980. Lawrenz received a B.A. in English from Carroll University (Carroll College then), a M.Div. from Trinity Evangelical Divinity School and a Ph.D. in historical theology from Marquette University. He is the author of eight books.

On March 18, 2009, Lawrenz announced that he would be stepping down as senior pastor. He resigned in early 2010 and was commissioned a minister-at-large.

== "No Regrets" Conference ==
Elmbrook is one of the hosting churches for the, "No Regrets Conference," a Wisconsin-statewide Christian men's conference with dozens of live host sites around the country. The conference is spearheaded by Elmbrook associate pastor Steve Sonderman.
