= Stuart Briscoe =

British evangelist (1930–2022)

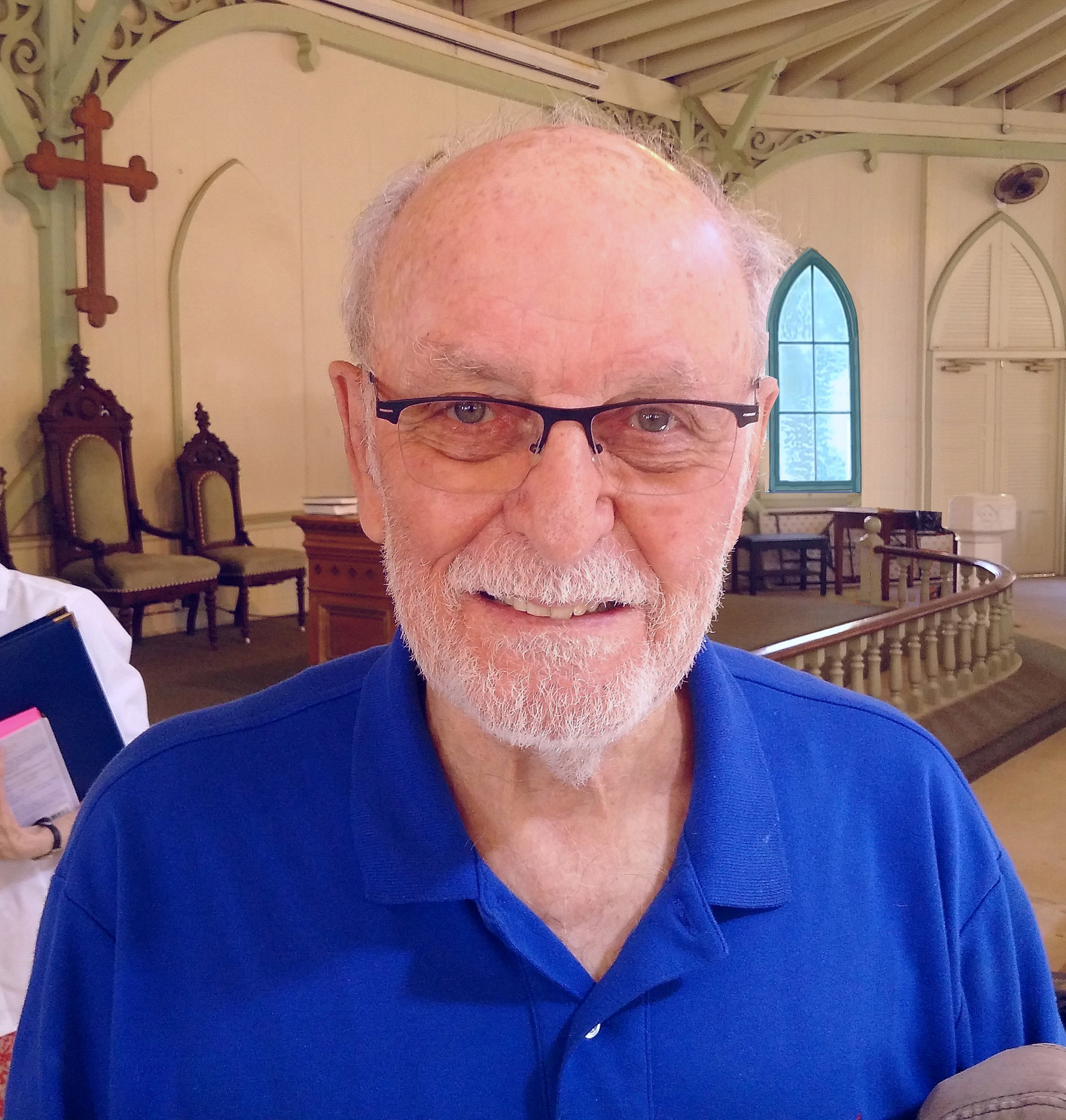
- Briscoe in 2018
- Born: D. Stuart Briscoe; 11 November 1930; Millom, Cumbria, England
- Died: 3 August 2022 (aged 91)
- Education: Capernwray Hall Bible School
- Occupation(s): Author, speaker
- Spouse: Jill Ryder (m. 1958)
- Children: 3
- Website: www.tellingthetruth.org/home

D. Stuart Briscoe (9 November 1930 – 3 August 2022) was an evangelical Christian author, speaker and senior pastor of Elmbrook Church, in Brookfield, Wisconsin, US. Elmbrook is the largest church in Wisconsin, averaging 7,000 in attendance per week. Briscoe is credited with transforming Elmbrook from a church of 300 members to one of the largest churches in America.

Briscoe was born in Millom, Cumbria, England, and had a career in banking followed by an international ministry under the auspices of Capernwray Missionary Fellowship of Torchbearers. In the 1960s, he became a conference speaker in the U.S., ministering to youth. Briscoe became senior pastor of Elmbrook Church in 1970. During his pastorate, Elmbrook grew enough to plant a number of "daughter" churches in the Greater Milwaukee area, while Briscoe also continued his international teaching ministry. He wrote more than 80 books. His media ministry, Telling the Truth, which he founded in 1971, continues to broadcast online as well as on SiriusXM.

In 2000, after working for 30 years as Elmbrook's senior pastor, Briscoe and his wife, Jill, embarked on new ministries as Elmbrook's Ministers-at-Large, concentrating on reaching out to pastors, missionaries and church leaders around the world, while still maintaining close ties with Elmbrook, their home church.

Briscoe and his wife had three children and they resided in Oconomowoc, Wisconsin.
