= Edouard Nomo-Ongolo =

Cameroonian politician and diplomat

Edouard Nomo-Ongolo is a Cameroonian political figure and diplomat who was appointed as Cameroon's Minister of Commerce and Industry in 1984. He previously worked as general manager of Chase Bank Cameroon, and he also served as a diplomat for Cameroon.

He remained in office during the August 1985 government changes, and was still in that office in 1988.
