= 1944 Southeastern Conference football season =

- Sport: Football
- Duration: September 23, 1944 – January 1, 1945
- Teams: 12
- Champion: Georgia Tech

SEC seasons
- ← 1943 1945 →

1944 Southeastern Conference football standings
	Conf.					Overall
Team		W		L			W		L
No. T–13 Georgia Tech $	4	–	0	–	0	8	–	3	–	0
No. 12 Tennessee	5	–	0	–	1	7	–	1	–	1
Georgia	4	–	2	–	0	7	–	3	–	0
Alabama	3	–	1	–	2	5	–	2	–	2
Mississippi State	3	–	2	–	0	6	–	2	–	0
LSU	2	–	3	–	1	2	–	5	–	1
Ole Miss	2	–	3	–	0	2	–	6	–	0
Tulane	1	–	2	–	0	4	–	3	–	0
Kentucky	1	–	5	–	0	3	–	6	–	0
Florida	0	–	3	–	0	4	–	3	–	0
Auburn	0	–	4	–	0	4	–	4	–	0
Vanderbilt	0	–	0	–	0	3	–	0	–	1
$ – Conference champion; Rankings from AP Poll

The 1944 Southeastern Conference football season was the twelfth season of college football played by the member schools of the Southeastern Conference (SEC) and was a part of the 1944 college football season. Georgia Tech compiled an 8–3 overall record, with a conference record of 4–0, and was SEC champion.

== Results and team statistics ==
Conf. rank	Team	Head coach	Overall record	Conf. record	AP final	PPG	PAG
1	Georgia Tech	William Alexander	8–3–0 (.727)	4–0–0 (1.000)	No. T–13	23.0	9.2
2	Tennessee	John Barnhill	7–1–1 (.833)	5–0–1 (.917)	No. 12	19.2	8.1
3	Georgia	Wally Butts	7–3–0 (.700)	4–2–0 (.667)		27.3	13.0
4	Alabama	Frank Thomas	5–2–2 (.667)	3–1–2 (.667)		30.2	9.2
5	Mississippi State	Allyn McKeen	6–2–0 (.750)	3–2–0 (.600)		27.4	9.9
6	LSU	Bernie Moore	2–5–1 (.313)	2–3–1 (.417)		11.5	12.6
7	Ole Miss	Harry Mehre	2–6–0 (.250)	2–3–0 (.400)		9.6	22.3
8	Tulane	Claude Simons Jr.	4–3–0 (.571)	1–2–0 (.333)		16.1	17.9
9	Kentucky	Albert D. Kirwan	3–6–0 (.333)	1–5–0 (.167)		13.9	16.3
10	Florida	Tom Lieb	4–3–0 (.571)	0–3–0 (.000)		15.4	19.4
11	Auburn	Carl M. Voyles	4–4–0 (.500)	0–4–0 (.000)		22.6	17.1
12	Vanderbilt	Doby Bartling	3–0–1 (.875)	0–0–0 (–)		16.8	5.8

Key
AP final = Rankings from AP sports writers. See 1944 college football rankings
PPG = Average of points scored per game
PAG = Average of points allowed per game

== Schedule ==
Index to colors and formatting
SEC member won
SEC member lost
SEC member tie
SEC teams in **bold**

=== Week Zero ===
Date	Visiting team	Home team	Site	Result	Attendance	Ref.
September 23	Mayport NAS	**Florida**	Florida Field • Gainesville, FL	**W** 36–6	6,000	
September 23	**Ole Miss**	**Kentucky**	McLean Stadium • Lexington, KY	**KEN** 7–27	11,000	

=== Week One ===
Date	Visiting team	Home team	Site	Result	Attendance	Ref.
September 29	Howard (AL)	Auburn	Cramton Bowl • Montgomery AL	**W** 32–0	10,000	
September 29	Wake Forest	Georgia	Sanford Stadium • Athens, GA	**L** 7–14	8,500	
September 30	Clemson	Georgia Tech	Grant Field • Atlanta, GA (rivalry)	**W** 51–0	15,000	
September 30	Jackson Field	Mississippi State	Scott Field • Starkville, MS	**W** 41–0	2,500	
September 30	**Kentucky**	Tennessee	Shields–Watkins Field • Knoxville, TN (rivalry)	**TEN** 26–13	15,000	
September 30	**Ole Miss**	Florida	Fairfield Stadium • Jacksonville, FL	**OM** 26–26	10,000	
September 30	**Alabama**	LSU	Tiger Stadium • Baton Rouge, LA (rivalry)	**T** 27–27	32,000	

=== Week Two ===
Date	Visiting team	Home team	Site	Result	Attendance	Ref.
October 6	Presbyterian	**Georgia**	Sanford Stadium • Athens, GA	**W** 67–0		
October 7	North Carolina	**Georgia Tech**	Grant Field • Atlanta, GA	**W** 28–0	15,000	
October 7	Howard (AL)	**Alabama**	Legion Field • Birmingham, AL	**W** 63–7	5,000	
October 7	Millsaps	**Mississippi State**	Scott Field • Starkville, MS	**W** 56–0		
October 7	Jacksonville NAS	**Florida**	Florida Field • Gainesville, FL	**W** 27–20	4,500	
October 7	Fourth Infantry	**Auburn**	Auburn Stadium • Auburn, AL	**W** 7–0	5,000	
October 7	Sewanee V-12	**Vanderbilt**	Hardee Field • Sewanee, TN (rivalry)	**T** 0–0		
October 7	**LSU**	Rice	Rice Field • Houston, TX	**L** 13–14	10,000	
October 7	**Tulane**	Notre Dame	Notre Dame Stadium • Notre Dame, IN	**L** 0–26	45,000	
October 7	Michigan State	**Kentucky**	McLean Stadium • Lexington, KY	**L** 0–2	10,000	
October 7	**Tennessee**	**Ole Miss**	Crump Stadium • Memphis, TN	**TEN** 20–7	15,000	

=== Week Three ===
Date	Visiting team	Home team	Site	Result	Attendance	Ref.
October 13	**Kentucky**	**Georgia**	Sanford Stadium • Athens, GA	**UGA** 13–12	9,000	
October 14	Millsaps	**Alabama**	Denny Stadium • Tuscaloosa, AL	**W** 55–0		
October 14	Arkansas A&M	**Mississippi State**	Scott Field • Starkville, MS	**W** 49–20		
October 14	Rice	**Tulane**	Tulane Stadium • New Orleans, LA	**W** 21–0	28,000	
October 14	Texas A&M	**LSU**	Tiger Stadium • Baton Rouge, LA (rivalry)	**L** 0–7	25,000	
October 14	**Auburn**	No. 10 **Georgia Tech**	Grant Field • Atlanta, GA (rivalry)	**GT** 27–7	20,000	
October 14	**Florida**	No. 15 **Tennessee**	Shields–Watkins Field • Knoxville, TN (rivalry)	**TEN** 40–0	8,000	
^{#}Rankings from AP Poll released prior to game.

=== Week Four ===
Date	Visiting team	Home team	Site	Result	Attendance	Ref.
October 20	Daniel Field	**Georgia**	Sanford Stadium • Athens, GA	**W** 53–6	3,000	
October 20	VMI	**Kentucky**	McLean Stadium • Lexington, KY	**W** 26–2	8,000	
October 21	No. 9 Navy	No. 8 **Georgia Tech**	Grant Field • Atlanta, GA	**W** **GT** 17–15	35,000	
October 21	No. 13 Tulsa	**Ole Miss**	Crump Stadium • Memphis, TN	**L** 0–47	8,000	
October 21	**Florida**	No. 15 **Tennessee**	Shields–Watkins Field • Knoxville, TN (rivalry)	**TEN** 40–0	8,000	
October 21	**Mississippi State**	**LSU**	Tiger Stadium • Baton Rouge, LA (rivalry)	**MSS** 6–13	25,000	
October 21	**Auburn**	**Tulane**	Tulane Stadium • New Orleans, LA (rivalry)	**TUL** 16–13	30,000	
^{#}Rankings from AP Poll released prior to game.

=== Week Five ===
Date	Visiting team	Home team	Site	Result	Attendance	Ref.
October 27	Georgia Pre-Flight	No. 5 **Georgia Tech**	Grant Field • Atlanta, GA	**W** 13–7	15,000	
October 27	**Kentucky**	**Alabama**	Cramton Bowl • Montgomery, AL	**ALA** 41–0	16,000	
October 28	SMU	**Tulane**	Tulane Stadium • New Orleans, LA	**W** 27–7	22,000	
October 28	Maryland	**Florida**	Florida Field • Gainesville, FL	**W** 14–6	7,000	
October 28	Tennessee Tech	**Vanderbilt**	Dudley Field • Nashville, TN	**W** 19–7	5,000	
October 28	Arkansas	**Ole Miss**	Crump Stadium • Memphis, TN (rivalry)	**W** 18–26	10,000	
October 28	Clemson	No. 19 **Tennessee**	Shields–Watkins Field • Knoxville, TN	**W** 26–7	11,000	
October 28	**LSU**	**Georgia**	Grant Field • Atlanta, GA	**LSU** 15–7		
^{#}Rankings from AP Poll released prior to game.

=== Week Six ===
Date	Visiting team	Home team	Site	Result	Attendance	Ref.
November 3	**Florida**	Miami (FL)	Burdine Stadium • Miami, FL (rivalry)	**W** 13–0	16,415	
November 4	Presbyterian	**Auburn**	Auburn Stadium • Auburn, AL	**W** 57–0	7,000	
November 4	**Vanderbilt**	Tennessee Tech	Overhill Field • Cookeville, TN	**W** 20–9		
November 4	No. 5 **Georgia Tech**	Duke	Duke Stadium • Durham, NC	**L** 13–19	30,000	
November 4	Jackson Field	**Ole Miss**	Hemingway Stadium • Oxford, MS	**L** 0–10	2,000	
November 4	No. 16 **Tennessee**	**LSU**	Tiger Stadium • Baton Rouge, LA	**TEN** 13–0	22,000	
November 4	**Georgia**	No. 19 **Alabama**	Legion Field • Birmingham, AL (rivalry)	**UGA** 14–7	22,000	
November 4	**Kentucky**	No. 18 **Mississippi State**	Crump Stadium • Memphis, TN	**MSS** 26–0	8,000	
^{#}Rankings from AP Poll released prior to game.

=== Week Seven ===
Date	Visiting team	Home team	Site	Result	Attendance	Ref.
November 11	Sewanee V-12	**Vanderbilt**	Dudley Field • Nashville, TN	**W** 28–7	5,000	
November 11	**Tulane**	No. 13 **Georgia Tech**	Grant Field • Atlanta, GA	**GT** 34–7	20,000	
November 11	**Georgia**	**Florida**	Fairfield Stadium • Jacksonville, FL (rivalry)	**UGA** 38–12	18,000	
November 11	**Ole Miss**	**Alabama**	Murphy High School Stadium • Mobile, AL (rivalry)	**ALA** 34–6	8,000	
November 11	No. 19 **Mississippi State**	**Auburn**	Legion Field • Birmingham, AL	**MSS** 26–21	14,000	
^{#}Rankings from AP Poll released prior to game.

=== Week Eight ===
Date	Visiting team	Home team	Site	Result	Attendance	Ref.
November 18	Temple	No. 17 **Tennessee**	Shields–Watkins Field • Knoxville, TN	**W** 27–14	15,000	
November 18	Clemson	**Tulane**	Tulane Stadium • New Orleans, LA	**W** 36–20	10,000	
November 18	West Virginia	**Kentucky**	McLean Stadium • Lexington, KY	**W** 40–9		
November 18	No. 9 **Georgia Tech**	**LSU**	Tiger Stadium • Baton Rouge, LA	**GT** 14–6	10,000	
November 18	**Georgia**	**Auburn**	Memorial Stadium • Columbus, GA (rivaley)	**UGA** 49–13	20,000	
November 18	No. 16 **Mississippi State**	**Alabama**	Denny Stadium • Tuscaloosa, AL (rivalry)	**ALA** 19–0	23,000	
^{#}Rankings from AP Poll released prior to game.

=== Week Nine ===
Date	Visiting team	Home team	Site	Result	Attendance	Ref.
November 24	Miami (FL)	**Auburn**	Burdine Stadium • Miami, FL	**W** 38–19	13,000	
November 24	Clemson	**Georgia**	Sanford Stadium • Athens, GA (rivalry)	**W** 21–7	3,500	
November 25	No. 18 Notre Dame	No. 10 **Georgia Tech**	Grant Field • Atlanta, GA	**L** 0–21	28,662	
November 25	No. 15 **Tennessee**	**Kentucky**	McLean Stadium • Lexington, KY	**TEN** 21–7		
November 25	**Mississippi State**	**Ole Miss**	Hemingway Stadium • Oxford, MS (rivalry)	**OM** 8–13	8,000	
^{#}Rankings from AP Poll released prior to game.

=== Week Ten ===
Date	Visiting team	Home team	Site	Result	Attendance	Ref.
December 2	**Georgia Tech**	**Georgia**	Sanford Stadium • Athens, GA (rivalry)	**GT** 44–0	26,000	
December 2	**Tulane**	**LSU**	Tiger Stadium • Baton Rouge, LA (rivalry)	**LSU** 25–6	30,000	
^{#}Rankings from AP Poll released prior to game.

=== Postseason ===
Date	Visiting team	Home team	Site	Result	Attendance	Ref.
January 1, 1945	Tulsa	No. 13 **Georgia Tech**	Burdine Stadium • Miami, FL (Orange Bowl)	**L** 12–26	29,426	
January 1, 1945	No. 12 **Tennessee**	No. 7 USC	Rose Bowl • Pasadena, CA (Rose Bowl)	**L** 0–25	91,000	
January 1, 1945	**Alabama**	No. 11 Duke	Tulane Stadium • New Orleans, LA (Sugar Bowl)	**L** 26–29	66,822	
^{#}Rankings from AP Poll released prior to game.

== All-conference players ==
The following players were recognized as consensus first-team honors from the Associated Press (AP) and United Press (UP) on the 1944 All-SEC football team:

- Phil Tinsley, End, Georgia Tech (AP-1, UP-1)
- Wash Serini, Tackle, Kentucky (AP-1, UP-1)
- Bob Dobelstein, Guard, Tennessee (AP-1, UP-1)
- Tex Warrington, Center, Auburn (AP-1, UP-1)
- Shorty McWilliams, Quarterback, Mississippi State (AP-1, UP-1)
- Dub Jones, Halfback, Tulane (AP-1, UP-1)
- Frank Broyles, Fullback, Georgia Tech (AP-1, UP-1 [as hb])

== All-Americans ==
One SEC player was a consensus first-team pick on the 1944 College Football All-America Team:

- Phil Tinsley, End, Georgia Tech (AAB, AP, COL, FN, INS, LK, NEA, SN)

Other SEC players receiving All-American honors from at least one selector were:

- Bob Dobelstein, Guard, Tennessee (AP-3)
- Caleb Warrington, Center, Auburn (AAB; AP-1; COL; FWAA-2; INS-2; NEA; SN; UP-3; WC)
- Frank Broyles, Quarterback, Georgia Tech (FWAA-2)
- Shorty McWilliams, Halfback, Mississippi State (AP-2; UP-2)

== Head coaches ==
Records through the completion of the 1944 season

Team	Head coach	Years at school	Overall record	Record at school	SEC record
Alabama	Frank Thomas	14	124–29–8 (.795)	98–20–7 (.812)	49–13–6 (.765)
Auburn	Carl M. Voyles	1	47–22–3 (.674)	4–4–0 (.500)	0–4–0 (.000)
Florida	Tom Lieb	4	63–54–4 (.537)	16–21–0 (.432)	4–12–0 (.250)
Georgia	Wally Butts	6	43–19–2 (.688)	43–19–2 (.688)	15–10–2 (.593)
Georgia Tech	William Alexander	25	134–95–15 (.580)	134–95–15 (.580)	33–31–5 (.514)
Kentucky	Albert D. Kirwan	6	24–28–4 (.464)	24–28–4 (.464)	4–22–3 (.190)
LSU	Bernie Moore	10	74–45–7 (.615)	62–33–4 (.646)	31–22–3 (.580)
Mississippi State	Allyn McKeen	5	53–13–2 (.794)	40–7–2 (.837)	19–6–2 (.741)
Ole Miss	Harry Mehre	6	94–55–7 (.625)	35–21–1 (.623)	24–26–3 (.481)
Tennessee	John Barnhill	3	24–4–2 (.833)	24–4–2 (.833)	12–2–1 (.833)
Tulane	Claude Simons Jr.	3	22–23–1 (.489)	11–11–0 (.500)	3–7–0 (.300)
Vanderbilt	Doby Bartling	1	3–0–1 (.875)	3–0–1 (.875)	0–0–0 (–)

== 1945 NFL draft ==
The following SEC players were selected in the 1945 NFL draft:

Round	Overall pick	Player name	School	Position	NFL team
1	1	Charley Trippi	Georgia	Halfback	Chicago Cardinals
1	2	Paul Duhart	Florida	Halfback	Pittsburgh Steelers
1	3	Joe Renfroe	Tulane	Back	Brooklyn Tigers
1	4	Eddie Prokop	Georgia Tech	Back	Boston Yanks
3	25	Alvin Dark	LSU	Back	Philadelphia Eagles
4	28	Bob Dobelstein	Tennessee	Guard	Chicago Cardinals
4	29	Roger Adams	Florida	Center	Pittsburgh Steelers
5	43	Joe Graham	Florida	End	Green Bay Packers
6	51	Johnny North	Vanderbilt	End	Washington Redskins
6	53	Barney Poole	Ole Miss	End	New York Giants
6	54	Don Wells	Georgia	Tackle	Green Bay Packers
7	61	John Steber	Georgia Tech	Guard	Washington Redskins
7	65	Casey Stephenson	Tennessee	Back	Green Bay Packers
8	70	Johnny August	Alabama	Back	Cleveland Rams
8	71	Art Porter	Tulane	End	Washington Redskins
9	78	Gene Meeks	Kentucky	Back	Chicago Cardinals
9	81	Dick Huffman	Tennessee	Tackle	Cleveland Rams
9	84	Curt Kuykendall	Auburn	Back	Washington Redskins
10	89	Art Brandau	Tennessee	Center	Pittsburgh Steelers
10	90	Roy Cross	Tennessee	End	Brooklyn Tigers
10	98	Hal Helscher	LSU	Back	Green Bay Packers
11	101	Halley Heard	LSU	Tackle	Chicago Cardinals
12	119	Billy Bevis	Tennessee	Back	New York Giants
13	125	Jack Aland	Alabama	Tackle	Cleveland Rams
13	127	Charlie Conerly	Ole Miss	Quarterback	Washington Redskins
14	133	Hal Self	Alabama	Back	Brooklyn Tigers
14	141	Stan Rhoades	Mississippi State	Back	New York Giants
15	151	Bill Montgomery	LSU	Back	Philadelphia Eagles
16	163	Jim Little	Kentucky	Tackle	New York Giants
17	170	Bob Jenkins	Alabama	Back	Washington Redskins
17	171	O. J. Key	Tulane	Back	Detroit Lions
18	181	Jim McWhorter	Alabama	Back	Detroit Lions
19	191	Eagle Matulich	Mississippi State	Back	Cleveland Rams
19	193	Jim Bradshaw	Auburn	Center	Washington Redskins
20	202	Bill Griffin	Kentucky	Tackle	Cleveland Rams
20	204	Mike Castronis	Florida	Guard	Detroit Lions
20	205	Broughton Williams	Florida	End	Chicago Bears
22	220	Fred Grant	Alabama	Back	Chicago Cardinals
23	231	Everett Hartwell	Auburn	End	Pittsburgh Steelers
23	233	Johnny Cook	Georgia	Back	Chicago Cardinals
23	237	Ray Olsen	Tulane	Back	Detroit Lions
23	239	Monk Mosley	Alabama	Back	Philadelphia Eagles
23	240	Jim Chadwell	Tennessee	Tackle	New York Giants
24	243	Ardie McClure	Georgia	Tackle	Chicago Cardinals
24	247	Russ Morrow	Tennessee	Center	Detroit Lions
25	258	Jack Green	Alabama	Guard	Chicago Bears
26	265	Felix Trapani	LSU	Guard	Brooklyn Tigers
26	266	Red Knight	LSU	Back	Chicago Cardinals
30	312	Charley Compton	Alabama	Tackle	Cleveland Rams
31	320	Bob Cummings	Vanderbilt	Center	Washington Redskins
31	322	Ken Reese	Alabama	Back	Philadelphia Eagles
32	329	John Staples	Alabama	Guard	New York Giants
