= 1946 Green Bay Packers season =

NFL team season

- Head coach: Curly Lambeau
- Home stadium: City Stadium; Wisconsin State Fair Park

Results
- Record: 6–5
- Division place: 3rd (tied) NFL Western
- Playoffs: Did not qualify

The 1946 Green Bay Packers season was their 28th season overall and their 26th season in the National Football League. The team finished with a 6–5 record under coach Curly Lambeau, earning them a third-place finish in the Western Conference.

== Offseason ==
=== NFL draft ===
Round	Pick	Player	Position	School/Club Team
1	6	Johnny Strzykalski	Back	Marquette
3	21	Bob Nussbaumer	Halfback	Michigan
5	36	Ed Cody	Back	Purdue
6	46	John Ferraro	Tackle	USC
7	56	Art Renner	End	Michigan
8	66	Bert Cole	Tackle	Oklahoma State
9	76	Grant Darnell	Guard	Texas A&M
10	86	Joe McAfee	Back	Holy Cross
11	96	Steve Conroy	Back	Holy Cross
12	106	Billy Hildebrand	End	Mississippi State
13	116	Tom Hand	Center	Iowa
14	126	George Hill	Guard	Georgia Tech
15	136	Jim Hough	Back	Clemson
16	146	Dean Gaines	Tackle	Georgia Tech
17	156	J. P. Miller	Guard	Georgia
18	166	Boyd Morse	End	Arizona
19	176	Joe Bradford	Center	USC
20	186	Bill DeRosa	Back	Boston College
21	196	Ralph Grant	Back	Bucknell
22	206	Howie Brown	Guard	Indiana
23	216	Andy Kosmac	Center	LSU
24	226	Maurice Stacy	Back	Washington
25	236	Chick Davidson	Tackle	Cornell
26	246	John Norton	Back	Washington
27	256	Ed Holtsinger	Back	Georgia Tech
28	266	Joe Campbell	End	Holy Cross
29	276	Francis Saunders	Tackle	Clemson
30	286	Al Sparlis	Guard	UCLA
31	291	Ralph Clymer	Guard	Purdue
32	296	Joervin Henderson	Center	Missouri

- Yellow indicates a future Pro Bowl selection

== Regular season ==
=== Schedule ===
Week	Date	Opponent	Result	Record
1	September 29	Chicago Bears	L 7–30	0–1
2	October 6	Los Angeles Rams	L 17–21	0–2
3	October 13	at Philadelphia Eagles	W 19–7	1–2
4	October 20	Pittsburgh Steelers	W 17–7	2–2
5	October 27	Detroit Lions	W 10–7	3–2
6	November 3	at Chicago Bears	L 7–10	3–3
7	November 10	at Chicago Cardinals	W 19–7	4–3
8	November 17	at Detroit Lions	W 9–0	5–3
9	November 24	Chicago Cardinals	L 6–24	5–4
10	December 1	at Washington Redskins	W 20–7	6-4
11	December 8	at Los Angeles Rams	L 17–38	6-5

== Standings ==
NFL Western Division
	W	L	T	PCT	DIV	PF	PA	STK
Chicago Bears	8	2	1	.800	6–1–1	289	193	W1
Los Angeles Rams	6	4	1	.600	5–2–1	277	257	W2
Chicago Cardinals	6	5	0	.545	5–3	260	198	W2
Green Bay Packers	6	5	0	.545	3–5	148	158	L1
Detroit Lions	1	10	0	.091	0–8	142	310	L4

Note: Tie games were not officially counted in the standings until 1972.

== Roster ==
1946 Green Bay Packers final roster
Backs: 78 Cliff Aberson DB/RB; 3 Tony Canadeo RB/DB; 51 Irv Comp DB/RB; 8 Bob Forte DB/RB; 64 Ted Fritsch LB/FB/K; 18 Ken Keuper DB/RB; 22 Roy McKay FB/DB/P; 16 Charlie Mitchell DB; 48 Bob Nussbaumer DB/RB; 80 Herm Rohrig RB/DB; 7 Walt Schlinkman FB; 42 Bruce Smith RB; 25 Al Zupek FB/LB	Linemen/Linebackers: 29 Charley Brock C/LB; 75 Tiny Croft DT/T; 35 Bob Flowers C/LB; 33 Lester Gatewood C/LB; 52 Bill Kuusisto G; 40 Bill Lee T/DT; 46 Russ Letlow G; 47 Paul Lipscomb T/G/DG; 58 Ed Neal DT/G/T; 63 Urban Odson DT/T; 17 Merv Pregulman G/LB; 44 Baby Ray DG/T/G; 21 Al Sparlis G; 45 Dick Wildung G/DG	Ends/Receivers: 54 Larry Craig FB; 23 Clyde Goodnight; 38 Nolan Luhn; 76 Tom Miller; 43 Don Wells; Rookies in italics
