= 1945 Green Bay Packers season =

NFL team season

- Head coach: Curly Lambeau
- Home stadium: City Stadium; Wisconsin State Fair Park

Results
- Record: 6–4
- Division place: 3rd NFL Western
- Playoffs: Did not qualify

The 1945 Green Bay Packers season was their 27th season overall and their 25th season in the National Football League. The team finished with a 6–4 record under coach Curly Lambeau, earning them a third-place finish in the Western Conference.

== Offseason ==
=== NFL draft ===
Round	Pick	Player	Position	School/Club Team
1	11	Walt Schlinkman	Fullback	Texas Tech
3	27	Clyde Goodnight	End	Tulsa
5	43	Joe Graham	End	Florida
6	54	Don Wells	Tackle	Georgia
7	65	Casey Stephenson	Back	Tennessee
8	76	Toby Collins	Tackle	Tulsa
9	87	Lamar Dingler	End	Arkansas
10	98	Hal Helscher	Back	LSU
11	109	Ralph Hammond	Center	Pittsburgh
12	120	Ed Podgorski	Tackle	Lafayette
13	131	Bill Hackett	Guard	Ohio State
14	142	Marv Lindsey	Back	Arkansas
15	153	Bob McClure	Tackle	Nevada
16	164	Harry Pieper	Center	California
17	175	Bob Kula	Back	Minnesota
18	186	Frank Hazard	Guard	Nebraska
19	197	Ed Jeffers	Tackle	Oklahoma State
20	208	Bill Prentice	Back	Santa Clara
21	219	Warren Fuller	End	Fordham
22	230	Fred Neilsen	Tackle	St. Mary's (CA)
23	241	Bob Gilmore	Back	Washington
24	252	Lloyd Baxter	Center	SMU
25	263	Nolan Luhn	End	Tulsa
26	274	Nestor Blanco	Guard	Colorado Mines
27	285	Bill Chestnut	Back	Kansas
28	296	Jim Thompson	Back	Washington State
29	307	Jim Evans	End	Idaho
30	318	Hamilton Nichols	Guard	Rice
31	324	John Priday	Back	Ohio State
32	330	Bill Joe Aldridge	Back	Oklahoma State

== Regular season ==
=== Schedule ===
Game	Date	Opponent	Result	Record	Venue	Attendance	Recap	Sources
1	September 30	**Chicago Bears**	**W** 31–21	1–0	City Stadium	24,525	Recap	
2	October 7	**Detroit Lions**	**W** 57–21	2–0	Wisconsin State Fair Park	20,463	Recap	
3	October 14	**Cleveland Rams**	**L** 14–27	2–1	City Stadium	24,607	Recap	
4	October 21	Boston Yanks	**W** 38–14	3–1	Wisconsin State Fair Park	20,846	Recap	
5	October 28	**Chicago Cardinals**	**W** 33–14	4–1	City Stadium	19,221	Recap	
6	November 4	at **Chicago Bears**	**L** 24–28	4–2	Wrigley Field	45,527	Recap	
7	November 11	at **Cleveland Rams**	**L** 7–20	4–3	League Park	28,686	Recap	
8	November 18	at Boston Yanks	**W** 28–0	5–3	Fenway Park	31,923	Recap	
9	November 25	at New York Giants	**W** 23–14	6–3	Polo Grounds	52,681	Recap	
10	December 2	at **Detroit Lions**	**L** 3–14	6–4	Briggs Stadium	23,468	Recap	
Note: Intra-division opponents are in **bold** text.

== Standings ==
NFL Western Division
	W	L	T	PCT	DIV	PF	PA	STK
Cleveland Rams	9	1	0	.900	7–0	244	136	W5
Detroit Lions	7	3	0	.700	5–2	195	194	W1
Green Bay Packers	6	4	0	.600	3–4	258	173	L1
Chicago Bears	3	7	0	.300	2–6	192	235	W2
Chicago Cardinals	1	9	0	.100	1–6	98	228	L6

Note: Tie games were not officially counted in the standings until 1972.

== Roster ==
1945 Green Bay Packers final roster
Backs: 79 Bob Adkins RB/S; 16 Lou Brock RB/CB; 51 Irv Comp RB/CB; 54 Larry Craig RB/S; 64 Ted Fritsch FB/LB/K; 18 Ken Keuper RB/S; 24 Joe Laws RB/CB; 3 Roy McKay RB/CB/P; 8 Russ Mosley RB/CB; 15 Chuck Sample FB/LB; 42 Bruce Smith RB/CB; 63 Ben Starret RB/S	Linemen/Linebackers: 27 Solon Barnett T/DT; 29 Charley Brock C/LB; 76 Bernie Crimmins G/DG; 75 Tiny Croft T/DT; 35 Bob Flowers C/LB; 45 Bill Kuusisto G/DG; 47 Paul Lipscomb T/DT; 58 Ed Neal T/DT; 22 Ernie Pannell T/DT; 44 Baby Ray T/DT; 33 Glen Sorenson G/DG/K; 21 Pete Tinsley G/DG; 46 Chuck Tollefson G/DG	Ends/Receivers: 23 Clyde Goodnight; 14 Don Hutson CB/K; 38 Nolan Luhn; 7 Joel Mason; 19 Carl Mulleneaux; Rookies in italics
