= 1946 Chicago Cardinals season =

American football team season

- Head coach: Jimmy Conzelman
- Home stadium: Comiskey Park

Results
- Record: 6–5
- Division place: 3rd (tied) NFL Western
- Playoffs: Did not qualify

The 1946 Chicago Cardinals season was the 27th season the team was in the league. The team improved on their previous output of 1–9, winning six games. They failed to qualify for the playoffs for the 21st consecutive season.

== Schedule ==
Week	Date	Opponent	Result	Record	Venue
1	September 20	at Pittsburgh Steelers	**L** 7–14	0–1	Forbes Field
2	September 30	Detroit Lions	**W** 34–14	1–1	Comiskey Park
3	October 6	**Chicago Bears**	**L** 17–34	1–2	Comiskey Park
4	October 13	at **Detroit Lions**	**W** 36–14	2–2	Briggs Stadium
5	October 20	at New York Giants	**L** 24–28	2–3	Polo Grounds
6	October 27	**Los Angeles Rams**	**W** 34–10	3–3	Comiskey Park
7	November 3	at Boston Yanks	**W** 28–14	4–3	Fenway Park
8	November 10	**Green Bay Packers**	**L** 7–19	4–4	Comiskey Park
9	November 17	at **Los Angeles Rams**	**L** 14–17	4–5	Los Angeles Memorial Coliseum
10	November 24	at **Green Bay Packers**	**W** 24–6	5–5	City Stadium
11	December 1	at **Chicago Bears**	**W** 35–28	6–5	Wrigley Field
12	Bye				
Note: Intra-division opponents are in **bold** text.

== Standings ==
NFL Western Division
	W	L	T	PCT	DIV	PF	PA	STK
Chicago Bears	8	2	1	.800	6–1–1	289	193	W1
Los Angeles Rams	6	4	1	.600	5–2–1	277	257	W2
Chicago Cardinals	6	5	0	.545	5–3	260	198	W2
Green Bay Packers	6	5	0	.545	3–5	148	158	L1
Detroit Lions	1	10	0	.091	0–8	142	310	L4

Note: Tie games were not officially counted in the standings until 1972.

== Roster ==
1946 Chicago Cardinals final roster
**Quarterbacks**: 44 Paul Christman; 22 Ray Mallouf P/DB; **Ends/Receivers**: 41 Billy Dewell; 24 Al Hust; 51 Pop Ivy; 80 Malcolm Kutner DB; 47 Joe Parker; 19 Eddie Rucinski	**Linemen/Linebackers**: 75 Ray Apolskis G/MG; 76 Lloyd Arms G/MG; 32 Vince Banonis LB/C; 57 Bill Blackburn LB/C/P; 11 Chet Bulger T/DT; 53 Bill Campbell T/DT; 55 Jake Colhouer MG/G; 63 Zuehl Conoly G/MG; 64 Ralph Foster DT/T; 70 Tom Kearns T/DT; 49 Bob Maddock G; 77 Stan Mauldin DT/T; 16 Dick Plasman T/DT; 20 Buster Ramsey G/MG; 42 Walt Rankin LB/FB; 36 Walt Szot T/DT; 15 Bob Zimny DT/T	**Backs**: 7 Elmer Angsman RB; 14 Ward Cuff RB/DB; 43 Al Drulis RB; 99 Marshall Goldberg DB/RB; 34 Pat Harder FB/K; 31 Jimmy Johnston DB/RB; 54 Frank Seno DB/RB; 48 Jimmy Strausbaugh RB; rookies in italics
