= 1944 Tennessee Volunteers football team =

American college football season

1944 Tennessee Volunteers football
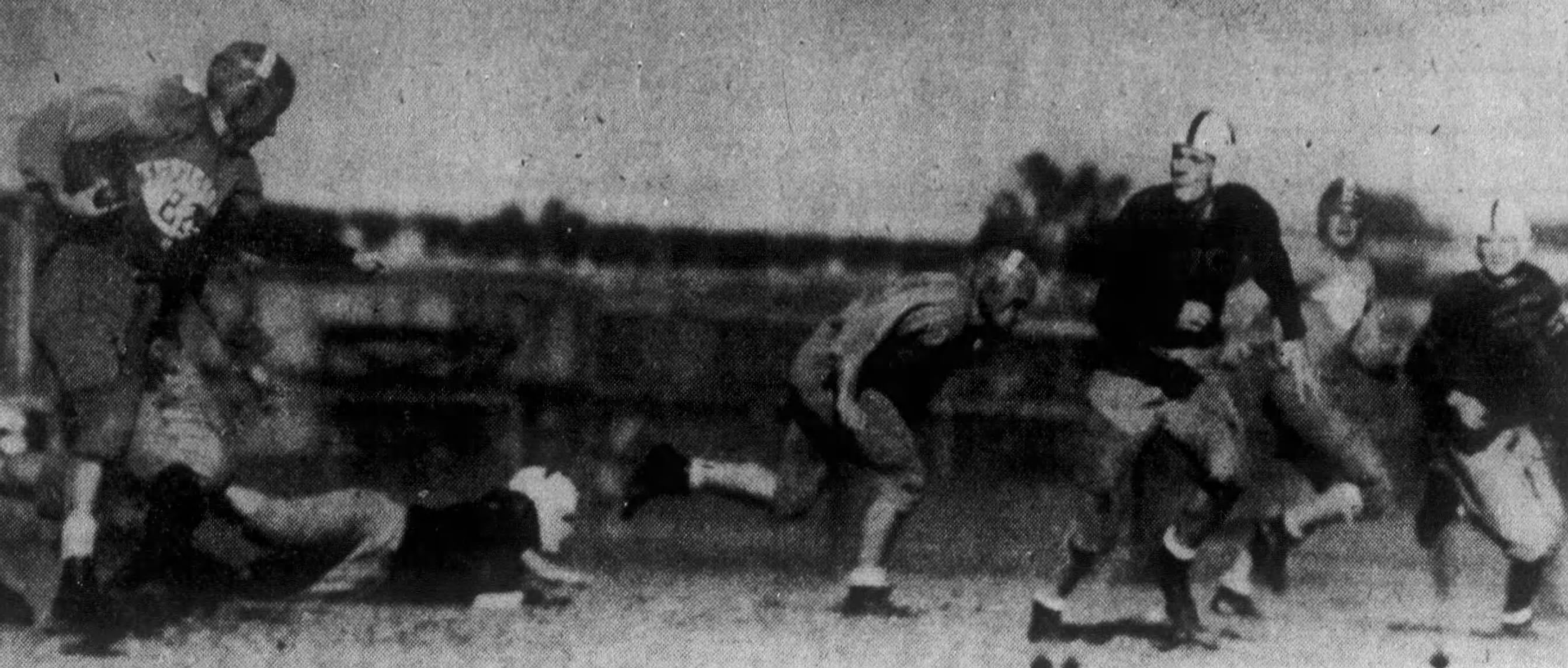
- In a photo published by the Knoxville Journal in 1944, the Volunteers' Buster Stephens (left) makes a 30-yard touchdown run in an informal game against Carson–Newman University.

Rose Bowl, L 0–25 vs. USC
- Conference: Southeastern Conference

Ranking
- AP: No. 12
- Record: 7–1–1 (5–0–1 SEC)
- Head coach: John Barnhill (3rd season)
- Home stadium: Shields–Watkins Field

1944 Southeastern Conference football standings
	Conf.					Overall
Team		W		L			W		L
No. T–13 Georgia Tech $	4	–	0	–	0	8	–	3	–	0
No. 12 Tennessee	5	–	0	–	1	7	–	1	–	1
Georgia	4	–	2	–	0	7	–	3	–	0
Alabama	3	–	1	–	2	5	–	2	–	2
Mississippi State	3	–	2	–	0	6	–	2	–	0
LSU	2	–	3	–	1	2	–	5	–	1
Ole Miss	2	–	3	–	0	2	–	6	–	0
Tulane	1	–	2	–	0	4	–	3	–	0
Kentucky	1	–	5	–	0	3	–	6	–	0
Florida	0	–	3	–	0	4	–	3	–	0
Auburn	0	–	4	–	0	4	–	4	–	0
Vanderbilt	0	–	0	–	0	3	–	0	–	1
$ – Conference champion; Rankings from AP Poll

The 1944 Tennessee Volunteers (variously Tennessee, UT, or the Vols) represented the University of Tennessee in the 1944 college football season. Playing as a member of the Southeastern Conference (SEC), the team was led by head coach John Barnhill, in his third year, and played their home games at Shields–Watkins Field in Knoxville, Tennessee. They finished the season with a record of seven wins, one loss and one tie (7–1–1 overall, 5–0–1 in the SEC), and concluded the season with a loss against USC in the 1945 Rose Bowl.

== Schedule ==
Date	Opponent	Rank	Site	Result	Attendance	Source
September 30	Kentucky		Shields–Watkins Field; Knoxville, TN (rivalry)	W 26–13	15,000	
October 7	vs. Ole Miss		Crump Stadium; Memphis, TN (rivalry)	W 20–7	15,000	
October 14	Florida	No. 15	Shields–Watkins Field; Knoxville, TN (rivalry)	W 40–0	8,000	
October 21	Alabama^{†}	No. 17	Shields–Watkins Field; Knoxville, TN (Third Saturday in October)	T 0–0	32,000	
October 28	Clemson*	No. 19	Shields–Watkins Field; Knoxville, TN	W 26–7	11,000	
November 4	at LSU	No. 16	Tiger Stadium; Baton Rouge, LA	W 13–0	22,000	
November 18	Temple*^{†}	No. 17	Shields–Watkins Field; Knoxville, TN	W 27–14	15,000	
November 25	at Kentucky	No. 15	McLean Stadium; Lexington, KY	W 21–7		
January 1	vs. No. 7 USC	No. 12	Rose Bowl; Pasadena, CA (Rose Bowl)	L 0–25	91,000	
*Non-conference game; ^{†}Homecoming; Rankings from AP Poll released prior to the game

== Rankings ==
Ranking movements Legend: ██ Increase in ranking ██ Decrease in ranking т = Tied with team above or below ( ) = First-place votes
	Week								
Poll	1	2	3	4	5	6	7	8	Final
AP	15т (1)	17	19т	16	18	17	15	10	12

== Team players drafted into the NFL ==
Player	Position	Round	Pick	NFL club
Bob Dobelstein	Guard	4	28	Chicago Cardinals
Casey Stephenson	Back	7	65	Green Bay Packers
Dick Huffman	Tackle	9	81	Cleveland Rams
Art Brandau	Center	10	89	Pittsburgh Steelers
Roy Cross	End	10	90	Brooklyn Tigers
Billy Bevis	Back	12	119	New York Giants
Jim Chadwell	Tackle	23	240	New York Giants
Russ Morrow	Center	24	247	Detroit Lions
