= 1944 Alabama Crimson Tide football team =

American college football season

1944 Alabama Crimson Tide football

Sugar Bowl, L 26–29 vs. Duke
- Conference: Southeastern Conference
- Record: 5–2–2 (3–1–2 SEC)
- Head coach: Frank Thomas (13th season)
- Captain: Joe Domnanovich
- Home stadium: Denny Stadium; Legion Field; Cramton Bowl

1944 Southeastern Conference football standings
| | Conf. | | | | | Overall |
| Team | | W | | L | | | W | | L |
|---|---|---|---|---|---|---|---|---|---|---|
| No. T–13 Georgia Tech $ | 4 | – | 0 | – | 0 | 8 | – | 3 | – | 0 |
| No. 12 Tennessee | 5 | – | 0 | – | 1 | 7 | – | 1 | – | 1 |
| Georgia | 4 | – | 2 | – | 0 | 7 | – | 3 | – | 0 |
| Alabama | 3 | – | 1 | – | 2 | 5 | – | 2 | – | 2 |
| Mississippi State | 3 | – | 2 | – | 0 | 6 | – | 2 | – | 0 |
| LSU | 2 | – | 3 | – | 1 | 2 | – | 5 | – | 1 |
| Ole Miss | 2 | – | 3 | – | 0 | 2 | – | 6 | – | 0 |
| Tulane | 1 | – | 2 | – | 0 | 4 | – | 3 | – | 0 |
| Kentucky | 1 | – | 5 | – | 0 | 3 | – | 6 | – | 0 |
| Florida | 0 | – | 3 | – | 0 | 4 | – | 3 | – | 0 |
| Auburn | 0 | – | 4 | – | 0 | 4 | – | 4 | – | 0 |
| Vanderbilt | 0 | – | 0 | – | 0 | 3 | – | 0 | – | 1 |
$ – Conference champion; Rankings from AP Poll

The 1944 Alabama Crimson Tide football team (variously "Alabama", "UA" or "Bama") represented the University of Alabama in the 1944 college football season. It was the Crimson Tide's 50th overall and 11th season as a member of the Southeastern Conference (SEC). The team was led by head coach Frank Thomas, in his 13th year, and played their home games at Denny Stadium in Tuscaloosa, Legion Field in Birmingham and at the Cramton Bowl in Montgomery. They finished the season with a record of five wins, two losses and two ties (5–2–2 overall, 3–1–2 in the SEC) and with a loss in the Sugar Bowl against Duke.

After a tie against LSU to open the season, Alabama then defeated both Howard and Millsaps before they dueled Tennessee to a scoreless tie in the fourth week. The Crimson Tide then defeated Kentucky before they suffered their only regular season loss against Georgia. Alabama then closed the season with wins over both Ole Miss and Mississippi State and secured a position in the Sugar Bowl where they lost to Duke.

The 1944 squad marked the return of football at Alabama after a one-year hiatus for the 1943 season due to the effects of World War II. However, as the war effort was ongoing at that time, the 1944 team was composed of players who were either too young and/or physically unable to enlist in the military. As the squad was generally smaller than both previous Alabama squads and than many they competed against, coach Thomas called this and the 1945 team the "War Babies."

== Schedule ==
| Date | Opponent | Rank | Site | Result | Attendance |
|---|---|---|---|---|---|
| September 30 | at LSU | | Tiger Stadium; Baton Rouge, LA (rivalry) | T 27–27 | 32,000 |
| October 7 | Howard (AL)* | | Legion Field; Birmingham, AL | W 63–7 | 5,000 |
| October 14 | Millsaps* | | Denny Stadium; Tuscaloosa, AL | W 55–0 | |
| October 21 | at No. 17 Tennessee | | Shields-Watkins Field; Knoxville, TN (Third Saturday in October) | T 0–0 | 32,000 |
| October 27 | Kentucky | | Cramton Bowl; Montgomery, AL | W 41–0 | 16,000 |
| November 4 | Georgia | No. 19 | Legion Field; Birmingham, AL (rivalry) | L 7–14 | 22,000 |
| November 11 | Ole Miss | | Murphy High School Stadium; Mobile, AL (rivalry) | W 34–6 | 8,000 |
| November 18 | No. 16 Mississippi State^{†} | | Denny Stadium; Tuscaloosa, AL (rivalry) | W 19–0 | 23,000 |
| January 1, 1945 | vs. No. 11 Duke* | | Tulane Stadium; New Orleans, LA (Sugar Bowl) | L 26–29 | 66,822 |
*Non-conference game; ^{†}Homecoming; Rankings from AP Poll released prior to the game

== Rankings ==
Ranking movements Legend: ██ Increase in ranking ██ Decrease in ranking — = Not ranked т = Tied with team above or below
| | Week | | | | | | | | |
| Poll | 1 | 2 | 3 | 4 | 5 | 6 | 7 | 8 | Final |
|---|---|---|---|---|---|---|---|---|---|
| AP | — | — | — | 19т | — | — | 13 | 16 | — |

== Game summaries ==
=== LSU ===
| Team | 1 | 2 | 3 | 4 | Total |
|---|---|---|---|---|---|
| Alabama | 7 | 14 | 6 | 0 | 27 |
| LSU | 7 | 7 | 7 | 6 | 27 |

- Date: September 30
- Location: Tiger Stadium
  Baton Rouge, LA
- Game attendance: 32,000

In what marked the return of Alabama football for the first time since the 1942 season, the Crimson Tide met LSU for the first time since 1930 and left Baton Rouge with a 27–27 tie to open the season. LSU scored first on a 76-yard, Elwyn Rowan touchdown run in the first minute of play for a 7–0 Tigers' lead. Alabama tied the game at 7–7 by the end of the quarter when Lowell Tew scored on a two-yard run to cap a drive that started from the LSU ten-yard line after a Ray Coates fumble was recovered by James Pearl. The Tigers retook a 14–7 lead early in the second quarter when Y. A. Tittle threw a 34-yard touchdown pass to Dan Sandifer. However, the Crimson Tide responded with touchdown runs of 16-yards by Tew and 24-yards by Harry Gilmer for a 21–14 halftime lead.

The Tigers again tied the game in the third when Felix Trapani blocked a John Wade punt and returned it 26-yards for a touchdown. On the kickoff that ensued, Gilmer returned it 95-yards for a touchdown, for a 27–21 lead after a missed extra point by Hugh Morrow. Clyde Lindsey tied the game at 27 for LSU in the fourth after he both blocked and returned an Alabama kick, but Andrew Lay missed the extra point to make the final score 27–27.

=== Howard (AL) ===
| Team | 1 | 2 | 3 | 4 | Total |
|---|---|---|---|---|---|
| Howard | 0 | 0 | 0 | 7 | 7 |
| • Alabama | 0 | 14 | 28 | 21 | 63 |

- Date: October 7
- Location: Legion Field
  Birmingham, AL
- Game attendance: 5,000

In the first Legion Field game of the season, Alabama defeated Howard (now Samford University) 63–7 in a game that featured 49, second half points. After a scoreless first quarter, Lowell Tew scored both of the Alabama touchdowns in the second quarter on a 35-yard interception return and on a 21-yard touchdown run for a 14–0 halftime lead. The Crimson Tide then closed the game with four touchdowns in the third and three touchdowns in the fourth quarter. Third-quarter touchdowns were scored by Norwood Hodges and John Hite twice on runs and by Jim Rupich on a blocked punt recovery. Fourth-quarter touchdowns were scored on touchdown passes from George Albright to Lacey West (34 and 55-yards) and to Carlos Izaguirre (49-yards).

=== Millsaps ===
| Team | 1 | 2 | 3 | 4 | Total |
|---|---|---|---|---|---|
| Millsaps | 0 | 0 | 0 | 0 | 0 |
| • Alabama | 7 | 6 | 21 | 21 | 55 |

- Date: October 14
- Location: Denny Stadium
  Tuscaloosa, AL

In the first Denny Stadium game of the season, Alabama shutout the Millsaps Majors 55–0 in a game that featured 42, second half points. The Crimson Tide took a 13–0 halftime lead after touchdown runs of one-yard by Norwood Hodges in the first and four-yards by James "Shorty" Robertson in the second. They extended their lead to 34–0 at the end of the third with touchdowns scored on a one-yard Hal Self run, a six-yard Harry Gilmer run and on an 11-yard Hodges run. Alabama then concluded with three fourth-quarter touchdowns on a 12-yard Ed Podbielniak run, a short Self run and on a 19-yard John Hite run.

=== Tennessee ===
Third Saturday in October

| Team | 1 | 2 | 3 | 4 | Total |
|---|---|---|---|---|---|
| Alabama | 0 | 0 | 0 | 0 | 0 |
| #17 Tennessee | 0 | 0 | 0 | 0 | 0 |

- Date: October 21
- Location: Shields-Watkins Field
  Knoxville, TN
- Game attendance: 32,000

Against the Volunteers, Alabama settled for a 0–0 tie before 32,000 fans at Shields-Watkins Field. In a game dominated by both defenses, Tennessee stopped Alabama drives three times from within their own 30-yard line in the fourth quarter to preserve the tie score.

=== Kentucky ===
| Team | 1 | 2 | 3 | 4 | Total |
|---|---|---|---|---|---|
| Kentucky | 0 | 0 | 0 | 0 | 0 |
| • Alabama | 7 | 20 | 14 | 0 | 41 |

- Date: October 27
- Location: Cramton Bowl
  Montgomery, AL
- Game attendance: 16,000

At the Cramton Bowl, the Crimson Tide shutout the Wildcats 41–0 for their first conference victory of the season. Harry Gilmer scored the first touchdown for Alabama on a 41-yard run for a 7–0 lead after the first. In the second, Gilmer scored again on a short run and threw touchdown passes to George Albright and Hugh Morrow for a 27–0 halftime lead. John Hite was then responsible for the final two touchdowns of the game with his six-yard pass to Ralph Jones and his 41-yard interception return.

=== Georgia ===
| Team | 1 | 2 | 3 | 4 | Total |
|---|---|---|---|---|---|
| • Georgia | 0 | 0 | 7 | 7 | 14 |
| #19 Alabama | 0 | 7 | 0 | 0 | 7 |

- Date: November 4
- Location: Legion Field
  Birmingham, AL
- Game attendance: 22,000

After their victory over Kentucky, Alabama entered the weekly AP Poll for the first time during the season at the No. 19 position. Although the Crimson Tide led 7–0 at halftime, a pair of second half touchdowns gave the Bulldogs the 17–7 victory at Legion Field. Fred Grant scored the only Alabama points of the game with his five-yard touchdown run in the second quarter. Down by a touchdown, Charles Smith tied the game with his three-yard run in the third and Stan Nestorak scored the game-winning touchdown in the fourth with his three-yard run.

=== Ole Miss ===
| Team | 1 | 2 | 3 | 4 | Total |
|---|---|---|---|---|---|
| Ole Miss | 0 | 6 | 0 | 0 | 6 |
| • Alabama | 21 | 0 | 0 | 13 | 34 |

- Date: November 11
- Location: Murphy H.S. Stadium
  Mobile, AL
- Game attendance: 8,000

In what was the first game played against Ole Miss since the 1933 season, Alabama defeated the Rebels 34–6 tie in Mobile. The Crimson Tide took control early with a three touchdown first quarter on a Fred Grant run, 48-yard Lowell Tew run and a short George Albright run. The Rebels' responded with their only points of the game in the second on a 29-yard Johnnie Bruce touchdown pass to Clyde Hooker to make the halftime score 21–6. After a scoreless third, a pair of fourth-quarter touchdowns were scored on runs by John Hite and Grant to make the final score 34–6.

=== Mississippi State ===
| Team | 1 | 2 | 3 | 4 | Total |
|---|---|---|---|---|---|
| #16 Mississippi State | 0 | 0 | 0 | 0 | 0 |
| • Alabama | 7 | 6 | 6 | 0 | 19 |

- Date: November 18
- Location: Denny Stadium
  Tuscaloosa, AL
- Game attendance: 23,000

On what was homecoming before the largest crowd to date at Denny Stadium, Alabama upset an undefeated Mississippi State Maroons squad 19–0 in Tuscaloosa. After Harry Gilmer fumbled the opening kickoff to give the Maroons excellent field position, Fred Grant returned an interception 87-yards for a 7–0 lead. The other two Alabama touchdowns were scored on runs by Lowell Tew and Grant.

=== Duke ===
Sugar Bowl

| Team | 1 | 2 | 3 | 4 | Total |
|---|---|---|---|---|---|
| Alabama | 12 | 7 | 0 | 7 | 26 |
| • #11 Duke | 7 | 6 | 7 | 9 | 29 |

- Date: January 1
- Location: Tulane Stadium
  New Orleans, LA
- Game attendance: 32,000

On November 25, university officials announced that Alabama had accepted a bid to play in the 1945 Sugar Bowl against the Duke Blue Devils. In the game, the Crimson Tide were defeated 29–26 before 66,822 fans at Tulane Stadium after Duke score a late, game-winning touchdown. The Blue Devils took an early 7–0 on a 14-yard George Clark run before a pair of one-yard, Norwood Hodges touchdown runs gave the Crimson Tide a 12–7 lead at the end of the first. Alabama extended their lead further to 19–7 after Harry Gilmer threw a 12-yard touchdown pass to Ralph Jones. Duke responded with a pair of short, Tom Davis touchdown runs to take a 10–19 lead into the fourth quarter. In the fourth, Hugh Morrow had a touchdown on a 78-yard interception return; however, the Crimson Tide lost the game after Gilmer took a safety and George Clark scored the game-winning points on a 20-yard run.

== Personnel ==
=== Varsity letter winners ===
| Player | Hometown | Position |
|---|---|---|
| Francis Cassidy | Neff, Ohio | Tackle |
| William Conway | Birmingham, Alabama | Guard |
| Marion Edwards | Attalla, Alabama | Tackle |
| William Fields | Nashville, Tennessee | End |
| Bruno Filippini | Powhatan Point, Ohio | Guard |
| Harry Gilmer | Birmingham, Alabama | Halfback |
| Fred Grant | Christiansburg, Virginia | Fullback |
| John Hite | Nashville, Tennessee | Halfback |
| Norwood Hodges | Hueytown, Alabama | Fullback |
| Ralph Jones | Florence, Alabama | End |
| Vaughn Mancha | Birmingham, Alabama | Center |
| Frank McAlpine | Boligee, Alabama | Fullback |
| John McConville | Wheeling, West Virginia | End |
| Hugh Morrow | Birmingham, Alabama | Quarterback |
| James Pearl | Connellsville, Pennsylvania | End |
| James Robertson | Scottsboro, Alabama | Halfback |
| Hal Self | Decatur, Alabama | Quarterback |
| Lowell Tew | Waynesboro, Mississippi | Fullback |
| Wayne Walker | Martha, Tennessee | Tackle |
| Tom Whitley | Birmingham, Alabama | Tackle |
| John Wozniak | Fairhope, Pennsylvania | Guard |

=== Coaching staff ===
| Name | Position | Seasons at Alabama | Alma mater |
|---|---|---|---|
| Frank Thomas | Head coach | 13 | Notre Dame (1923) |
| Lew Bostick | Assistant coach | 2 | Alabama (1939) |
| Ellis "Red" Houston | Assistant coach | 1 | Alabama (1933) |
| Malcolm Laney | Assistant coach | 1 | Alabama (1932) |

== NFL draft ==
On April 8, 1945, the National Football League held its ninth draft. In the draft, Johnny August was selected as the fifth pick in the eighth round (70th overall) by the Cleveland Rams, Jack Aland was selected as the fifth pick in the 13th round (125th overall) by the Cleveland Rams, Hal Self was selected as the second pick in the 14th round (133rd overall) by the Brooklyn Tigers, Bobby Tom Jenkins was selected as the sixth pick in the 17th round (170th overall) by the Washington Redskins, Jim McWhorter was selected as the sixth pick in the 18th round (181st overall) by the Detroit Lions, Norm Mosley was selected as the ninth pick in the 23rd round (239th overall) by the Philadelphia Eagles, Jack Green was selected as the sixth pick in the 25th round (258th overall) by the Chicago Bears, Charles Compton was selected as the fifth pick in the 30th round (312th overall) by the Cleveland Rams, Ken Reese was selected as the fourth pick in the 31st round (322nd overall) by the Philadelphia Eagles and John Staples was selected as the fifth pick in the 32nd round (329th overall) by the New York Giants.

== See also ==
- 1943 Alabama Informals football team the team that unofficially represented the University of Alabama in 1943.
