= 1945 Sugar Bowl =

American college football game

- 11th Sugar Bowl
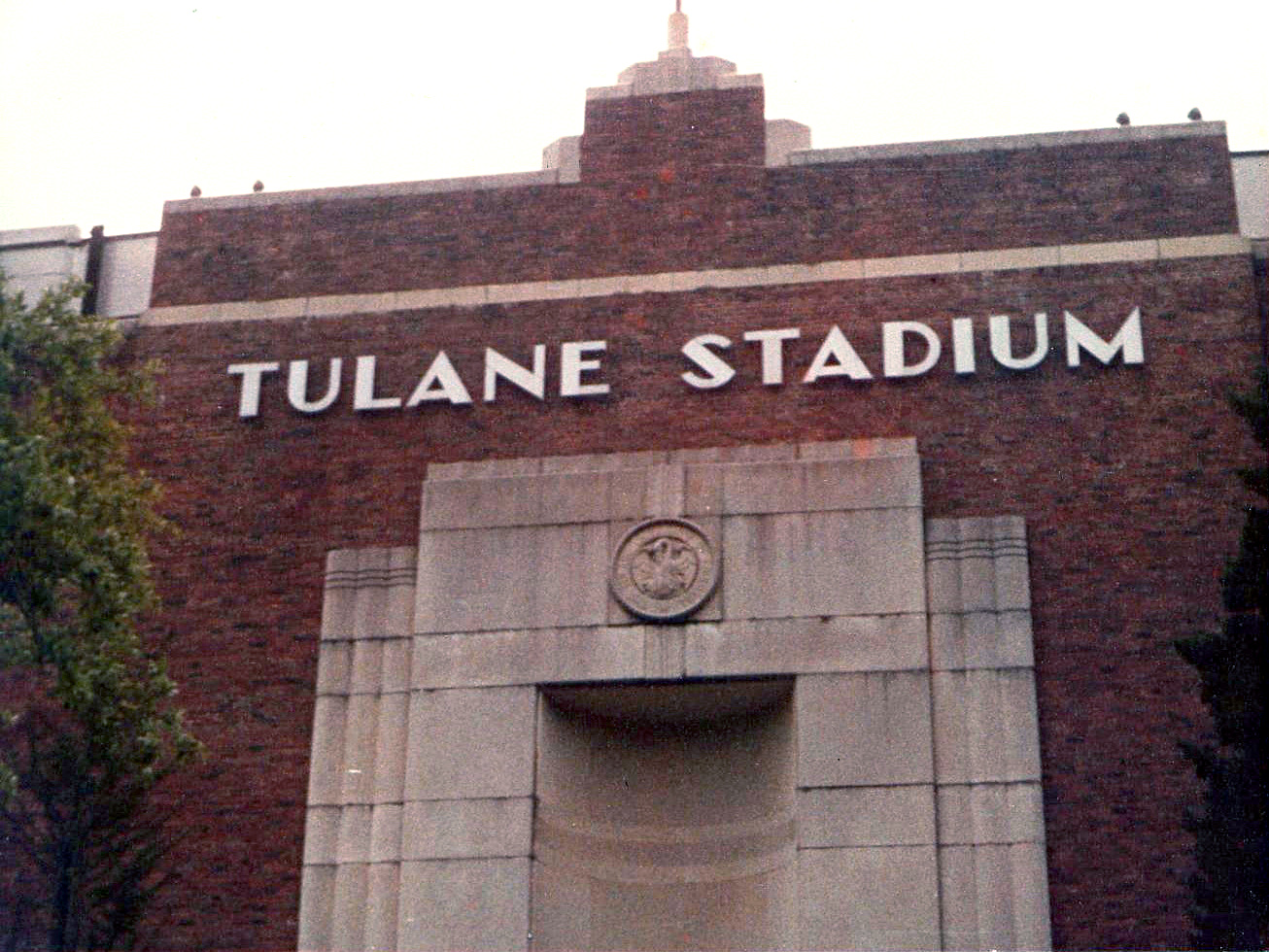
- Tulane Stadium in New Orleans, Louisiana, hosted the Sugar Bowl.
Alabama Crimson Tide	Duke Blue Devils
(5–1–2)	(5–4)
SEC	SoCon
26	29
Head coach: Frank Thomas	Head coach: Eddie Cameron
	AP 11
	1	2	3	4	Total
Alabama	12	7	0	7	26
Duke	7	6	7	9	29
- Date: January 1, 1945
- Season: 1944
- Stadium: Tulane Stadium
- Location: New Orleans, Louisiana
- Referee: J.D. Thomason (SEC; split crew: SEC, Southern)
- Attendance: 72,000

The 1945 Sugar Bowl, part of the 1944 bowl game season, took place on January 1, 1945, at Tulane Stadium in New Orleans, Louisiana. The competing teams were the Alabama Crimson Tide, representing the Southeastern Conference (SEC) and the Duke Blue Devils, representing the Southern Conference (SoCon). Duke won the game 29–26.

== Teams ==
=== Alabama ===
The 1942 Alabama squad finished the regular season 5–1–2 with its loss coming to the Georgia Bulldogs and the two ties coming against the LSU Tigers and the Tennessee Volunteers. With most of America's youth still serving in the armed forces, Frank Thomas scrambled to assemble a team in 1944. Finally he was able to fill out a roster, mostly composed of 17-year-old freshmen and students who had been rejected as unsuitable for military service. This team went down in Tide history as the "War Babies". On November 25, the Crimson Tide was invited to compete in the Sugar Bowl, marking the first time that a school had competed in the four major bowls at that time (Rose, Cotton, Orange and Sugar Bowls). The appearance marked the first for Alabama in the Sugar Bowl, and their eighth overall bowl appearance.

== Game summary ==
Scoring summary

Quarter	Time	Drive			Team	Scoring information	Score	
Quarter	Time	Plays	Yards	TOP	Team	Scoring information	Alabama	Duke
1	12:35		67 yards, 5 plays		Duke	George Clark 14-yard touchdown run, Harold Raether kick good	0	7
1			64 yards, 6 plays		Alabama	Norwood Hodges 1-yard touchdown run, Hugh Morrow kick no good	6	7
1			97 yards, 7 plays		Alabama	Norwood Hodges 1-yard touchdown run, Hugh Morrow kick blocked	12	7
2			80 yards, 6 plays		Alabama	Ralph Jones 12-yard touchdown reception from Harry Gilmer, Hugh Morrow kick good	19	7
2			63 yards, 4 plays		Duke	Tom Davis 2-yard touchdown run, Harold Raether kick no good	19	13
3			64 yards, 12 plays		Duke	Tom Davis 1-yard touchdown run, Harold Raether kick good	19	20
4					Alabama	Interception returned 78 yards for touchdown by Hugh Morrow, Hugh Morrow kick good	26	20
4					Duke	Harry Gilmer intentionally grounded the ball in endzone for a safety	26	22
4			40 yards, 2 plays		Duke	George Clark 20-yard touchdown run, Harold Raether kick good	26	29
"TOP" = time of possession. For other American football terms, see Glossary of American football.							26	29
