= 1944 Georgia Tech Yellow Jackets football team =

American college football season

1944 Georgia Tech Yellow Jackets football

SEC champion

Orange Bowl, L 12–26 vs. Tulsa
- Conference: Southeastern Conference

Ranking
- AP: No. T–13
- Record: 8–3 (4–0 SEC)
- Head coach: William Alexander (25th season)
- Captain: Phil Tinsley
- Home stadium: Grant Field

1944 Southeastern Conference football standings
	Conf.					Overall
Team		W		L			W		L
No. T–13 Georgia Tech $	4	–	0	–	0	8	–	3	–	0
No. 12 Tennessee	5	–	0	–	1	7	–	1	–	1
Georgia	4	–	2	–	0	7	–	3	–	0
Alabama	3	–	1	–	2	5	–	2	–	2
Mississippi State	3	–	2	–	0	6	–	2	–	0
LSU	2	–	3	–	1	2	–	5	–	1
Ole Miss	2	–	3	–	0	2	–	6	–	0
Tulane	1	–	2	–	0	4	–	3	–	0
Kentucky	1	–	5	–	0	3	–	6	–	0
Florida	0	–	3	–	0	4	–	3	–	0
Auburn	0	–	4	–	0	4	–	4	–	0
Vanderbilt	0	–	0	–	0	3	–	0	–	1
$ – Conference champion; Rankings from AP Poll

The 1944 Georgia Tech Yellow Jackets football team was an American football team that represented Georgia Tech as a member of the Southeastern Conference (SEC) during the 1944 college football season. In their 25th year under head coach William Alexander, the Yellow Jackets compiled an overall record of 8–3, with a conference record of 4–0, and finished as SEC champion.

== Schedule ==
Date	Opponent	Rank	Site	Result	Attendance	Source
September 30	Clemson*		Grant Field; Atlanta, GA (rivalry)	W 51–0	15,000	
October 7	North Carolina*		Grant Field; Atlanta, GA	W 28–0	15,000	
October 14	Auburn	No. 10	Grant Field; Atlanta, GA (rivalry)	W 27–0	20,000	
October 21	No. 9 Navy*	No. 8	Grant Field; Atlanta, GA	W 17–15	35,000	
October 27	Georgia Pre-Flight*	No. 5	Grant Field; Atlanta, GA	W 13–7	15,000	
November 4	at Duke*	No. 5	Duke Stadium; Durham, NC	L 13–19	30,000	
November 11	Tulane	No. 13	Grant Field; Atlanta, GA	W 34–7	20,000	
November 18	at LSU	No. 9	Tiger Stadium; Baton Rouge, LA	W 14–6	10,000	
November 25	No. 18 Notre Dame*	No. 10	Grant Field; Atlanta, GA (rivalry)	L 0–21	28,662	
December 2	at Georgia		Sanford Stadium; Athens, GA (rivalry)	W 44–0	26,000	
January 1	vs. Tulsa*	No. 13	Burdine Stadium; Miami, FL (Orange Bowl)	L 12–26	29,426	
*Non-conference game; Rankings from AP Poll released prior to the game

== Rankings ==
Ranking movements Legend: ██ Increase in ranking ██ Decrease in ranking — = Not ranked т = Tied with team above or below ( ) = First-place votes
	Week								
Poll	1	2	3	4	5	6	7	8	Final
AP	10	8	5	5 (1)	13	9	10	—	13т

== Roster ==
- Frank Broyles
