= 1944 Tulane Green Wave football team =

American college football season

1944 Tulane Green Wave football
- Conference: Southeastern Conference
- Record: 4–3 (1–2 SEC)
- Head coach: Claude Simons Jr. (3rd season)
- Captain: Game captains
- Home stadium: Tulane Stadium

1944 Southeastern Conference football standings
| | Conf. | | | | | Overall |
| Team | | W | | L | | | W | | L |
|---|---|---|---|---|---|---|---|---|---|---|
| No. T–13 Georgia Tech $ | 4 | – | 0 | – | 0 | 8 | – | 3 | – | 0 |
| No. 12 Tennessee | 5 | – | 0 | – | 1 | 7 | – | 1 | – | 1 |
| Georgia | 4 | – | 2 | – | 0 | 7 | – | 3 | – | 0 |
| Alabama | 3 | – | 1 | – | 2 | 5 | – | 2 | – | 2 |
| Mississippi State | 3 | – | 2 | – | 0 | 6 | – | 2 | – | 0 |
| LSU | 2 | – | 3 | – | 1 | 2 | – | 5 | – | 1 |
| Ole Miss | 2 | – | 3 | – | 0 | 2 | – | 6 | – | 0 |
| Tulane | 1 | – | 2 | – | 0 | 4 | – | 3 | – | 0 |
| Kentucky | 1 | – | 5 | – | 0 | 3 | – | 6 | – | 0 |
| Florida | 0 | – | 3 | – | 0 | 4 | – | 3 | – | 0 |
| Auburn | 0 | – | 4 | – | 0 | 4 | – | 4 | – | 0 |
| Vanderbilt | 0 | – | 0 | – | 0 | 3 | – | 0 | – | 1 |
$ – Conference champion; Rankings from AP Poll

The 1944 Tulane Green Wave football team was an American football team that represented Tulane University as a member of the Southeastern Conference (SEC) during the 1944 college football season. In its third year under head coach Claude Simons Jr., Tulane compiled a 4–3 record (1–2 in conference games), finished eighth in the SEC, and was outscored by a total of 125 to 113.

The Green Wave played its home games at Tulane Stadium in New Orleans.

== Schedule ==
| Date | Opponent | Site | Result | Attendance | Source |
|---|---|---|---|---|---|
| October 7 | at Notre Dame* | Notre Dame Stadium; Notre Dame, IN | L 0–26 | 45,000 | |
| October 14 | Rice* | Tulane Stadium; New Orleans, LA | W 21–0 | 28,000 | |
| October 21 | Auburn | Tulane Stadium; New Orleans, LA (rivalry) | W 16–13 | 30,000 | |
| October 28 | SMU* | Tulane Stadium; New Orleans, LA | W 27–7 | 22,000 | |
| November 11 | at No. 13 Georgia Tech | Tulane Stadium; New Orleans, LA | L 7–34 | 20,000 | |
| November 18 | Clemson* | Tulane Stadium; New Orleans, LA | W 36–20 | 10,000 | |
| December 2 | at LSU | Tiger Stadium; Baton Rouge, LA (Battle for the Rag) | L 6–25 | 30,000 | |
*Non-conference game; Rankings from AP Poll released prior to the game
