= 1944 Florida Gators football team =

American college football season

1944 Florida Gators football
- Conference: Southeastern Conference
- Record: 4–3 (0–3 SEC)
- Head coach: Tom Lieb (4th season)
- Captain: Joe Graham
- Home stadium: Florida Field

1944 Southeastern Conference football standings
	Conf.					Overall
Team		W		L			W		L
No. T–13 Georgia Tech $	4	–	0	–	0	8	–	3	–	0
No. 12 Tennessee	5	–	0	–	1	7	–	1	–	1
Georgia	4	–	2	–	0	7	–	3	–	0
Alabama	3	–	1	–	2	5	–	2	–	2
Mississippi State	3	–	2	–	0	6	–	2	–	0
LSU	2	–	3	–	1	2	–	5	–	1
Ole Miss	2	–	3	–	0	2	–	6	–	0
Tulane	1	–	2	–	0	4	–	3	–	0
Kentucky	1	–	5	–	0	3	–	6	–	0
Florida	0	–	3	–	0	4	–	3	–	0
Auburn	0	–	4	–	0	4	–	4	–	0
Vanderbilt	0	–	0	–	0	3	–	0	–	1
$ – Conference champion; Rankings from AP Poll

The 1944 Florida Gators football team represented the University of Florida during the 1944 college football season. The season was the fourth for Tom Lieb as the head coach of the Florida Gators football team. The highlights of the season included the Gators' 13–6 homecoming victory over the Maryland Terrapins and their 13–0 shutout of the in-state rival Miami Hurricanes on the Hurricanes' home field. The Gators also scored solid victories over teams from two U.S. Naval Air Stations in nearby Jacksonville. Lieb's 1944 Florida Gators finished with a 4–3 overall record and a 0–3 record in the Southeastern Conference (SEC), placing tenth among twelve SEC teams.`

== Schedule ==
Date	Time	Opponent	Site	Result	Attendance	Source
September 23	8:00 p.m.	Mayport NAS*	Florida Field; Gainesville, FL	W 36–6	6,000	
September 30		vs. Ole Miss	Fairfield Stadium; Jacksonville, FL	L 6–26	10,000	
October 7	8:00 p.m.	Jacksonville NAS*	Florida Field; Gainesville, FL	W 27–20	4,500	
October 14		at No. 15 Tennessee	Shields–Watkins Field; Knoxville, TN (rivalry)	L 0–40	8,000	
October 28		Maryland*^{†}	Florida Field; Gainesville, FL	W 14–6	7,000	
November 3		at Miami (FL)*	Burdine Stadium; Miami, FL (rivalry)	W 13–0	16,415	
November 11		vs. Georgia	Fairfield Stadium; Jacksonville, FL (rivalry)	L 12–38	18,000	
*Non-conference game; ^{†}Homecoming; Rankings from AP Poll released prior to the game
