= 1944 Vanderbilt Commodores football team =

American college football season

1944 Vanderbilt Commodores football
- Conference: Southeastern Conference
- Record: 3–0–1 (0–0 SEC)
- Head coach: Doby Bartling (1st season)
- Captains: Lee Austin; Dick Bostick
- Home stadium: Dudley Field

1944 Southeastern Conference football standings
| | Conf. | | | | | Overall |
| Team | | W | | L | | | W | | L |
|---|---|---|---|---|---|---|---|---|---|---|
| No. T–13 Georgia Tech $ | 4 | – | 0 | – | 0 | 8 | – | 3 | – | 0 |
| No. 12 Tennessee | 5 | – | 0 | – | 1 | 7 | – | 1 | – | 1 |
| Georgia | 4 | – | 2 | – | 0 | 7 | – | 3 | – | 0 |
| Alabama | 3 | – | 1 | – | 2 | 5 | – | 2 | – | 2 |
| Mississippi State | 3 | – | 2 | – | 0 | 6 | – | 2 | – | 0 |
| LSU | 2 | – | 3 | – | 1 | 2 | – | 5 | – | 1 |
| Ole Miss | 2 | – | 3 | – | 0 | 2 | – | 6 | – | 0 |
| Tulane | 1 | – | 2 | – | 0 | 4 | – | 3 | – | 0 |
| Kentucky | 1 | – | 5 | – | 0 | 3 | – | 6 | – | 0 |
| Florida | 0 | – | 3 | – | 0 | 4 | – | 3 | – | 0 |
| Auburn | 0 | – | 4 | – | 0 | 4 | – | 4 | – | 0 |
| Vanderbilt | 0 | – | 0 | – | 0 | 3 | – | 0 | – | 1 |
$ – Conference champion; Rankings from AP Poll

The 1944 Vanderbilt Commodores football team was an American football team that represented Vanderbilt University as a member of the Southeastern Conference (SEC) during the 1944 college football season. In their first year under head coach Doby Bartling, the Commodores compiled an overall record of 3–0–1, with a conference record of 0–0, and finished 12th in the SEC.

== Schedule ==
| Date | Opponent | Site | Result | Attendance | Source |
|---|---|---|---|---|---|
| October 7 | at Sewanee V-12* | Hardee Field; Sewanee, TN (rivalry) | T 0–0 | | |
| October 28 | Tennessee Tech* | Dudley Field; Nashville, TN | W 19–7 | 5,000 | |
| November 4 | at Tennessee Tech* | Overhill Field; Cookeville, TN | W 20–9 | | |
| November 11 | Sewanee V-12* | Dudley Field; Nashville, TN | W 28–7 | 5,000 | |
*Non-conference game
