= 1944 Ole Miss Rebels football team =

American college football season

1944 Ole Miss Rebels football
- Conference: Southeastern Conference
- Record: 2–6 (2–3 SEC)
- Head coach: Harry Mehre (6th season)
- Home stadium: Hemingway Stadium

1944 Southeastern Conference football standings
	Conf.					Overall
Team		W		L			W		L
No. T–13 Georgia Tech $	4	–	0	–	0	8	–	3	–	0
No. 12 Tennessee	5	–	0	–	1	7	–	1	–	1
Georgia	4	–	2	–	0	7	–	3	–	0
Alabama	3	–	1	–	2	5	–	2	–	2
Mississippi State	3	–	2	–	0	6	–	2	–	0
LSU	2	–	3	–	1	2	–	5	–	1
Ole Miss	2	–	3	–	0	2	–	6	–	0
Tulane	1	–	2	–	0	4	–	3	–	0
Kentucky	1	–	5	–	0	3	–	6	–	0
Florida	0	–	3	–	0	4	–	3	–	0
Auburn	0	–	4	–	0	4	–	4	–	0
Vanderbilt	0	–	0	–	0	3	–	0	–	1
$ – Conference champion; Rankings from AP Poll

The 1944 Ole Miss Rebels football team was an American football team that represented the University of Mississippi (Ole Miss) as a member of the Southeastern Conference (SEC) during the 1944 college football season. In their sixth year under head coach Harry Mehre, the Rebels compiled an overall record of 2–6, with a conference record of 2–3, and finished seventh in the SEC.

== Schedule ==
Date	Opponent	Site	Result	Attendance	Source
September 23	at Kentucky	McLean Stadium; Lexington, KY	L 7–27	11,000	
September 30	at Florida	Fairfield Stadium; Jacksonville, FL	W 26–6	10,000	
October 7	vs. Tennessee	Crump Stadium; Memphis, TN (rivalry)	L 7–20	15,000	
October 21	vs. No. 13 Tulsa*	Crump Stadium; Memphis, TN	L 0–47	8,000	
October 28	vs. Arkansas*	Crump Stadium; Memphis, TN (rivalry)	L 18–26	10,000	
November 4	Jackson Field*	Hemingway Stadium; Oxford, MS	L 0–10	2,000	
November 11	at Alabama	Murphy High School Stadium; Mobile, AL (rivalry)	L 6–34	8,000	
November 25	Mississippi State	Hemingway Stadium; Oxford, MS (Egg Bowl)	W 13–8	8,000	
*Non-conference game; Rankings from AP Poll released prior to the game
