= 1944 Kentucky Wildcats football team =

American college football season

1944 Kentucky Wildcats football
- Conference: Southeastern Conference
- Record: 3–6 (1–5 SEC)
- Head coach: Albert D. Kirwan (6th season)
- Captain: Jim Little
- Home stadium: McLean Stadium

1944 Southeastern Conference football standings
	Conf.					Overall
Team		W		L			W		L
No. T–13 Georgia Tech $	4	–	0	–	0	8	–	3	–	0
No. 12 Tennessee	5	–	0	–	1	7	–	1	–	1
Georgia	4	–	2	–	0	7	–	3	–	0
Alabama	3	–	1	–	2	5	–	2	–	2
Mississippi State	3	–	2	–	0	6	–	2	–	0
LSU	2	–	3	–	1	2	–	5	–	1
Ole Miss	2	–	3	–	0	2	–	6	–	0
Tulane	1	–	2	–	0	4	–	3	–	0
Kentucky	1	–	5	–	0	3	–	6	–	0
Florida	0	–	3	–	0	4	–	3	–	0
Auburn	0	–	4	–	0	4	–	4	–	0
Vanderbilt	0	–	0	–	0	3	–	0	–	1
$ – Conference champion; Rankings from AP Poll

The 1944 Kentucky Wildcats football team represented the University of Kentucky in the 1944 college football season.

== Schedule ==
Date	Opponent	Site	Result	Attendance	Source
September 23	Ole Miss	McLean Stadium; Lexington, KY	W 27–7		
September 30	at Tennessee	Shields–Watkins Field; Knoxville, TN (rivalry)	L 13–26	15,000	
October 7	Michigan State*	McLean Stadium; Lexington, KY	L 0–2	10,000	
October 13	at Georgia	Sanford Stadium; Athens, GA	L 12–13		
October 20	VMI*	McLean Stadium; Lexington, KY	W 26–2	8,000	
October 27	at Alabama	Cramton Bowl; Montgomery, AL	L 0–41	16,000	
November 4	at No. 18 Mississippi State	Crump Stadium; Memphis, TN	L 0–26		
November 18	West Virginia*	McLean Stadium; Lexington, KY	W 40–9		
November 25	No. 15 Tennessee	McLean Stadium; Lexington, KY	L 7–21		
*Non-conference game; Rankings from AP Poll released prior to the game
