= 1945 Chicago Cardinals season =

American football team season

- Head coach: Phil Handler
- Home stadium: Comiskey Park

Results
- Record: 1–9
- Division place: 5th NFL Western
- Playoffs: Did not qualify

The 1945 Chicago Cardinals season was the 25th season the team was in the league; this does not count the 1944 season, in which the Cardinals merged with the Pittsburgh Steelers (the NFL considers "Card-Pitt" as a separate franchise).

== 1945 season ==
The newly liberated Cards had little chance of success in the 1945 season; not only were they riding a sixteen-game losing streak dating back to 1942, but the schedule-makers did them no favours, either. Under pressure from their Comiskey Park landlords, the White Sox, the Cardinals played only two of their games at Comiskey: their last two, in November and December, after the baseball season was over. Their season opener, against the Detroit Lions, was officially a home game, but it was moved to Wisconsin State Fair Park in suburban Milwaukee (sometimes home of the Green Bay Packers). The Lions decked the Cards, 10–0, the first of four shutouts the club would endure in 1945.

The Cardinals were then compelled to play their next seven games on the road, which remains the longest "road trip" in NFL history. After losses in Cleveland and Philadelphia, the Cardinals actually returned to Chicago to take on their cross-city rivals, the Bears -- and got their only win of the season, a 16–7 triumph in Wrigley Field, as Leo Cantor scored twice. This would snap the Cardinals 19-game losing streak, and prove to be the highlight of the season, as they proceeded to lose games in earnest -- not to mention in Detroit, Green Bay, Washington and Pittsburgh. Finally getting to play in Comiskey on November 18, the Cards lost to the Rams, 35–21; two weeks later, the Bears (with coach George Halas back from the war) would get their revenge on the Cardinals with a 28–20 win, ending the last-place Cards' season at 1–9.

The 1945 Chicago Cardinals were inept on both sides of the ball, finishing ninth of ten NFL teams in both points scored (98, ahead of Pittsburgh) and points allowed (228, fewer than only the Bears). At the quarterback position, Paul Christman completed 89 of 219 passes for 1,147 yards, with five touchdowns and twelve interceptions. Frank Seno was the team's top rusher with 355 yards, while Leo Cantor scored five of the club's fifteen touchdowns. (The Cards' kicking game wasn't much, either: they attempted only four field goals in 1945, and missed them all.) They failed to qualify for the playoffs for the 13th consecutive season, since the creation of divisions and the NFL Championship game in 1933. Things looked bleak for the lowly Cardinals and their fans -- but just two years later, Chicago would race to an NFL title, only the second in their history -- and as of 2023, their last one to date,

== Schedule ==
Week	Date	Opponent	Result	Record	Venue
1	September 23	**Detroit Lions**	**L** 0–10	0–1	Wisconsin State Fair Park
2	September 30	at **Cleveland Rams**	**L** 0–21	0–2	League Park
3	October 7	at Philadelphia Eagles	**L** 6–21	0–3	Shibe Park
4	October 14	at **Chicago Bears**	**W** 16–7	1–3	Wrigley Field
5	October 21	at **Detroit Lions**	**L** 0–26	1–4	Briggs Stadium
6	October 28	at **Green Bay Packers**	**L** 14–33	1–5	City Stadium
7	November 4	at Washington Redskins	**L** 21–24	1–6	Griffith Stadium
8	November 11	at Pittsburgh Steelers	**L** 0–23	1–7	Forbes Field
9	November 18	**Cleveland Rams**	**L** 21–35	1–8	Comiskey Park
10	Bye				
11	December 2	**Chicago Bears**	**L** 20–28	1–9	Comiskey Park
12	Bye				
Note: Intra-division opponents are in **bold** text.

== Standings ==
NFL Western Division
	W	L	T	PCT	DIV	PF	PA	STK
Cleveland Rams	9	1	0	.900	7–0	244	136	W5
Detroit Lions	7	3	0	.700	5–2	195	194	W1
Green Bay Packers	6	4	0	.600	3–4	258	173	L1
Chicago Bears	3	7	0	.300	2–6	192	235	W2
Chicago Cardinals	1	9	0	.100	1–6	98	228	L6

Note: Tie games were not officially counted in the standings until 1972.

== Roster ==
1945 Chicago Cardinals final roster
**Quarterbacks**: 15 Paul Christman S; 55 Vince Oliver S; **Ends/Receivers**: 29 Joe Carter; 41 Billy Dewell; 42 Pop Ivy; 19 Eddie Rucinski	**Linemen/Linebackers**: 26 Ray Apolskis G/DG; 66 Libby Bertagnolli G/DG; 73 Chet Bulger T/DT; 43 Ray Busler G/DG; 21 Bill Campbell C/LB; 64 Gil Duggan T/DT; 25 Bob Eckl T/DT; 31 Ralph Fife G/DG; 9 Ralph Foster DT/T; 17 Joe Kuharich G/DG/K; 75 Vic Obeck G/DG; 23 Cliff Speegle C/LB; 63 Bob Zimny T/DT	**Backs**: 28 Ernie Bonelli RB/CB; 50 Leo Cantor RB/CB; 39 Al Drulis FB/LB; 33 Johnny Knolla RB/CB; 51 Bus Mertes RB/CB; 40 Walt Rankin FB/LB; 54 Frank Seno RB/CB; 58 Mario Tonelli FB/LB; 20 Joe Vodicka RB/CB; **Reserve**: 43 Marshall Robnett C/LB (IR); rookies in italics
