= 1944 Mississippi State Maroons football team =

American college football season

1944 Mississippi State Maroons football
- Conference: Southeastern Conference
- Record: 6–2 (3–2 SEC)
- Head coach: Allyn McKeen (5th season)
- Home stadium: Scott Field

1944 Southeastern Conference football standings
	Conf.					Overall
Team		W		L			W		L
No. T–13 Georgia Tech $	4	–	0	–	0	8	–	3	–	0
No. 12 Tennessee	5	–	0	–	1	7	–	1	–	1
Georgia	4	–	2	–	0	7	–	3	–	0
Alabama	3	–	1	–	2	5	–	2	–	2
Mississippi State	3	–	2	–	0	6	–	2	–	0
LSU	2	–	3	–	1	2	–	5	–	1
Ole Miss	2	–	3	–	0	2	–	6	–	0
Tulane	1	–	2	–	0	4	–	3	–	0
Kentucky	1	–	5	–	0	3	–	6	–	0
Florida	0	–	3	–	0	4	–	3	–	0
Auburn	0	–	4	–	0	4	–	4	–	0
Vanderbilt	0	–	0	–	0	3	–	0	–	1
$ – Conference champion; Rankings from AP Poll

The 1944 Mississippi State Maroons football team was an American football team that represented Mississippi State College (now known as Mississippi State University) as a member of the Southeastern Conference (SEC) during the 1944 college football season. In their fifth year under head coach Allyn McKeen, the Maroons compiled an overall record of 6–2, with a conference record of 3–2, and finished fifth in the SEC.

The Maroons returned to action after not playing in 1943 due to World War II. Halfback Shorty McWilliams was named the SEC Player of the Year by the Nashville Banner.

== Schedule ==
Date	Opponent	Rank	Site	Result	Attendance	Source
September 30	Jackson Field*		Scott Field; Starkville, MS	W 41–0	2,500	
October 7	Millsaps*		Scott Field; Starkville, MS	W 56–0		
October 14	Arkansas A&M*		Scott Field; Starkville, MS	W 49–20		
October 21	at LSU		Tiger Stadium; Baton Rouge, LA (rivalry)	W 13–6	25,000	
November 4	Kentucky	No. 18	Crump Stadium; Memphis, TN	W 26–0	8,000	
November 11	at Auburn	No. 19	Legion Field; Birmingham, AL	W 26–21	14,000	
November 18	at Alabama	No. 16	Denny Stadium; Tuscaloosa, AL (rivalry)	L 0–19	23,000	
November 25	at Ole Miss		Hemingway Stadium; Oxford, MS (Egg Bowl)	L 8–13	8,000	
*Non-conference game; Rankings from AP Poll released prior to the game

== Rankings ==
Ranking movements Legend: ██ Increase in ranking ██ Decrease in ranking — = Not ranked т = Tied with team above or below
	Week								
Poll	1	2	3	4	5	6	7	8	Final
AP	—	—	19т	18	19	16	—	—	—
