= 1944 Auburn Tigers football team =

American college football season

1944 Auburn Tigers football
- Conference: Southeastern Conference
- Record: 4–4 (0–4 SEC)
- Head coach: Carl M. Voyles (1st season)
- Home stadium: Auburn Stadium; Legion Field; Cramton Bowl

1944 Southeastern Conference football standings
	Conf.					Overall
Team		W		L			W		L
No. T–13 Georgia Tech $	4	–	0	–	0	8	–	3	–	0
No. 12 Tennessee	5	–	0	–	1	7	–	1	–	1
Georgia	4	–	2	–	0	7	–	3	–	0
Alabama	3	–	1	–	2	5	–	2	–	2
Mississippi State	3	–	2	–	0	6	–	2	–	0
LSU	2	–	3	–	1	2	–	5	–	1
Ole Miss	2	–	3	–	0	2	–	6	–	0
Tulane	1	–	2	–	0	4	–	3	–	0
Kentucky	1	–	5	–	0	3	–	6	–	0
Florida	0	–	3	–	0	4	–	3	–	0
Auburn	0	–	4	–	0	4	–	4	–	0
Vanderbilt	0	–	0	–	0	3	–	0	–	1
$ – Conference champion; Rankings from AP Poll

The 1944 Auburn Tigers football team represented Auburn University in the 1944 college football season. It was the Tigers' 53rd overall and 12th season as a member of the Southeastern Conference (SEC). The team was led by head coach Carl M. Voyles, in his first year, and played their home games at Auburn Stadium in Auburn, the Cramton Bowl in Montgomery and Legion Field in Birmingham, Alabama. They finished the season with a record of three wins and four losses (3–4 overall, 0–4 in the SEC).

== Schedule ==
Date	Time	Opponent	Site	Result	Attendance	Source
September 29		Howard (AL)*	Cramton Bowl; Montgomery AL	W 32–0	10,000	
October 7	3:00 p.m.	Fourth Infantry*	Auburn Stadium; Auburn, AL	W 7–0	5,000	
October 14		at No. 10 Georgia Tech	Grant Field; Atlanta, GA (rivalry)	L 0–27	20,000	
October 21		at Tulane	Tulane Stadium; New Orleans, LA (rivalry)	L 13–16	30,000	
November 4		Presbyterian*^{†}	Auburn Stadium; Auburn, AL	W 57–0	7,000	
November 11		Mississippi State	Legion Field; Birmingham, AL	L 21–26	14,000	
November 18		vs. Georgia	Memorial Stadium; Columbus, GA (rivalry)	L 13–49	20,000	
November 24		at Miami (FL)*	Burdine Stadium; Miami, FL	W 38–19	13,000	
*Non-conference game; ^{†}Homecoming; Rankings from AP Poll released prior to the game; All times are in Central time
