= 1944 LSU Tigers football team =

American college football season

1944 LSU Tigers football
- Conference: Southeastern Conference
- Record: 2–5–1 (2–3–1 SEC)
- Head coach: Bernie Moore (10th season)
- Offensive scheme: Single wing
- Home stadium: Tiger Stadium

1944 Southeastern Conference football standings
	Conf.					Overall
Team		W		L			W		L
No. T–13 Georgia Tech $	4	–	0	–	0	8	–	3	–	0
No. 12 Tennessee	5	–	0	–	1	7	–	1	–	1
Georgia	4	–	2	–	0	7	–	3	–	0
Alabama	3	–	1	–	2	5	–	2	–	2
Mississippi State	3	–	2	–	0	6	–	2	–	0
LSU	2	–	3	–	1	2	–	5	–	1
Ole Miss	2	–	3	–	0	2	–	6	–	0
Tulane	1	–	2	–	0	4	–	3	–	0
Kentucky	1	–	5	–	0	3	–	6	–	0
Florida	0	–	3	–	0	4	–	3	–	0
Auburn	0	–	4	–	0	4	–	4	–	0
Vanderbilt	0	–	0	–	0	3	–	0	–	1
$ – Conference champion; Rankings from AP Poll

The 1944 LSU Tigers football team was an American football team that represented Louisiana State University (LSU) as a member of the Southeastern Conference (SEC) during the 1944 college football season. In their tenth year under head coach Bernie Moore, the Tigers compiled an overall record of 2–5–1, with a conference record of 2–3–1, and finished sixth in the SEC.

== Schedule ==
Date	Opponent	Site	Result	Attendance	Source
September 30	Alabama	Tiger Stadium; Baton Rouge, LA (rivalry)	T 27–27	32,000	
October 7	at Rice*	Rice Field; Houston, TX	L 13–14	10,000	
October 14	Texas A&M*	Tiger Stadium; Baton Rouge, LA (rivalry)	L 0–7	25,000	
October 21	Mississippi State	Tiger Stadium; Baton Rouge, LA (rivalry)	L 6–13	25,000	
October 28	vs. Georgia	Grant Field; Atlanta, GA	W 15–7	15,000	
November 4	No. 16 Tennessee^{†}	Tiger Stadium; Baton Rouge, LA	L 0–13	22,000	
November 18	No. 9 Georgia Tech	Tiger Stadium; Baton Rouge, LA	L 6–14	10,000	
December 2	Tulane	Tiger Stadium; Baton Rouge, LA (Battle for the Rag)	W 25–6	30,000	
*Non-conference game; ^{†}Homecoming; Rankings from AP Poll released prior to the game
