= Ernie Bonelli =

American football player (1919–2009)

No. 28, 74
- Position: Fullback / Defensive back / Return specialist

Personal information
- Born: July 27, 1919; Russellton, Pennsylvania, U.S.
- Died: October 12, 2009 (aged 90); Upper St. Clair Township, Pennsylvania, U.S.
- Listed height: 5 ft 11 in (1.80 m)
- Listed weight: 194 lb (88 kg)

Career information
- High school: Aspinwall Area (PA)
- College: Pittsburgh

Career history
- Chicago Cardinals (1945); Pittsburgh Steelers (1946)

Awards and highlights
- College All-Star Game (1945); Italian-American Sports Hall of Fame; Western Pennsylvania Sports Hall of Fame; Fox Chapel Area Hall of Fame
- Stats at Pro Football Reference

Ernie Bonelli
- Military career
- Allegiance: United States of America
- Branch: United States Army Air Corps
- Service years: 1941–1945
- Unit: Third Air Force
- Conflicts: Operation Torch

Ernest Bernard Bonelli (July 27, 1919 – October 12, 2009) was an American football player for the Chicago Cardinals and Pittsburgh Steelers of the National Football League.

== Early life ==
He won a football scholarship to the University of Pittsburgh, where he played fullback and defensive back for coach Jock Sutherland.

In 1941, he enlisted in the United States Army Air Corps and served as a radar operator on B-17 bombers. In 1942, he was part of the invasion of North Africa at Casablanca. He also played football for the Third Air Force Gremlins, sharing the backfield with Charley Trippi. After World War II ended, he returned to Pittsburgh and played in the 1945 College All-Star Game.

== Football career ==
He was signed by the Cardinals for the 1945 season, appearing in seven games as a running back, kick returner, and defensive back. He was traded to the Steelers for 1946, where he appeared in three games as a running back. He retired after the 1946 season and later worked in medical sales in Pittsburgh.

Bonelli was selected to the Italian-American Sports Hall of Fame, the Fox Chapel Area Hall of Fame and the Western Pennsylvania Sports Hall of Fame. He died on October 12, 2009, at age 90.
