= Ray Busler =

American football player (1914–1969)

No. 43
- Position: Tackle

Personal information
- Born: January 16, 1914; Watertown, Wisconsin, U.S.
- Died: October 9, 1969 (aged 55); Granite City, Illinois, U.S.
- Listed height: 6 ft 1 in (1.85 m)
- Listed weight: 222 lb (101 kg)

Career information
- High school: Watertown (WI)
- College: Marquette

Career history
- Chicago Cardinals (1940–1941, 1945)

Career statistics
- Games played: 20
- Stats at Pro Football Reference

Raymond Albert Busler (January 16, 1914 – October 9, 1969) was a player in the National Football League. He first played two seasons with the Chicago Cardinals. After three years away from the NFL, he was a member of the team during the 1945 NFL season.
