= Doby Bartling =

Biographical details
- Born: June 1, 1913
- Died: October 9, 1992 (aged 79); Jackson, Mississippi, U.S.

Playing career
- 1934–1935: Ole Miss
- Position: Quarterback

Coaching career (HC unless noted)

Football
- 1936–1938: Canton HS (MS)
- 1939–1941: Meridian HS (MS) (assistant)
- 1942: Meridian HS (MS)
- 1943: Vanderbilt (assistant)
- 1944–1945: Vanderbilt
- 1946–1950: Millsaps

Basketball
- 1939–1942: Meridian HS (MS)
- 1946–1951: Millsaps

Baseball
- 1947–1949: Millsaps

Head coaching record
- Overall: 24–18–2 (college football); 25–63 (college basketball); 15–31 (college baseball)

McNeil "Doby" Bartling Jr. (June 1, 1913 – October 9, 1992) was an American football player and coach of football, basketball, and baseball. He served as head football coach at Vanderbilt University from 1944 to 1945 and at Millsaps College from 1946 to 1950, compiling a career college football record of 24–18–2. Bartling was also the head basketball coach at Millsaps from 1946 to 1951, tallying a mark of 25–63, and the head baseball coach at the school from 1947 to 1949, amassing a record of 15–31. He played football as a quarterback at the University of Mississippi. Bartling came to Vanderbilt in 1943 as an assistant coach after coaching at Meridian High School in Meridian, Mississippi.

Bartling was inducted into the Mississippi Sports Hall of Fame in 1977. He died of heart failure, on October 9, 1992, at Mississippi Baptist Medical Center in Jackson, Mississippi.

== Head coaching record ==
=== College football ===
Year	Team	Overall	Conference	Standing	Bowl/playoffs
Vanderbilt Commodores (Southeastern Conference) (1944–1945)
1944	Vanderbilt	3–0–1	0–0		
1945	Vanderbilt	3–6	2–4	9th	
Vanderbilt:		6–6–1	2–4		
Millsaps Majors (Independent) (1946–1947)
1946	Millsaps	5–1			
1947	Millsaps	4–2			
Millsaps Majors (Dixie Conference) (1948–1950)
1948	Millsaps	2–3–1	0–3	5th	
1949	Millsaps	2–5	0–4	6th	
1950	Millsaps	5–1			
Millsaps:		18–12–1			
Total:		24–18–2			
