= Paul Lipscomb =

American football player (1923–1964)

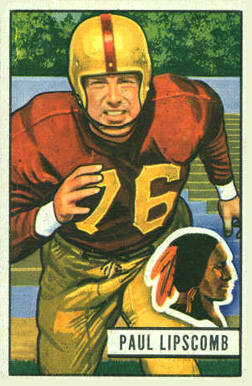
- Lipscomb on a 1951 Bowman football card

No. 47, 76, 74
- Position: Defensive tackle

Personal information
- Born: January 13, 1923; Benton, Illinois, U.S.
- Died: August 20, 1964 (aged 41); Elm Grove, Wisconsin, U.S.

Career information
- High school: Benton
- College: Tennessee
- NFL draft: 1945: undrafted

Career history
- Green Bay Packers (1945–1949); Washington Redskins (1950–1954); Chicago Bears (1954)

Awards and highlights
- 4× Pro Bowl selection (1950-53)

Career NFL statistics
- Games played: 117
- Fumble recoveries: 18
- Interceptions: 2
- Stats at Pro Football Reference

Paul F. "Lippy" Lipscomb (January 13, 1923 – August 20, 1964) was an American professional football player who was a lineman for 10 seasons in the National Football League (NFL), principally at the tackle position and also at guard and end. He played college football for the Tennessee Volunteers.

== Early life ==
Lipscomb was born in 1923 in Benton, Illinois, and attended Benton High School. He enrolled at the University of Tennessee and played college football at the tackle position on the 1942 Volunteers team that compiled a 9–1–1 record, defeated Tulsa in the 1943 Sugar Bowl, and was ranked No. 7 in the final AP poll. He then served in the United States Army during World War II.

== Professional football ==
After three years in the Army, Lipscomb signed with the Green Bay Packers. Lipscomb played five seasons for the Packers from 1945 to 1949. Lipscomb was accused by some of "dirty" football, though Lipscomb insisted, "I play the game as hard and as well as possible but not dirty."

In August 1950, the Packers traded Lipscomb to the Washington Redskins. He played five seasons for the Redskins from 1950 to 1954.

Lipscomb concluded his playing career with Chicago Bears during the 1954 season. He appeared in a total of 129 NFL games, 107 as a starter, was selected to play in four Pro Bowls (1950, 1951, 1952, and 1953) and was selected as a second-team All-Pro in 1951.

== Later life ==
Lipscomb later worked as sales manager for a financial firm. He died from a heart attack in 1964 at age 41 at his home in Elm Grove, Wisconsin.
