= John Barnhill (American football) =

American football player, coach, and college athletics administrator (1903–1973)

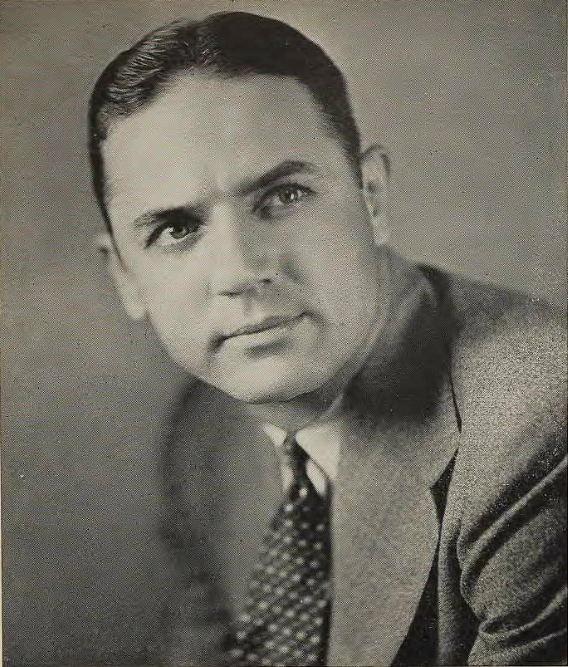
- Barnhill from The 1942 Volunteer

Biographical details
- Born: February 23, 1903; Savannah, Tennessee, U.S.
- Died: October 21, 1973 (aged 70); Fayetteville, Arkansas, U.S.

Playing career
- 1925–1927: Tennessee
- Position: Guard

Coaching career (HC unless noted)
- 1931–1934: Tennessee (freshmen)
- 1935–1940: Tennessee (line)
- 1941–1945: Tennessee
- 1946–1949: Arkansas

Administrative career (AD unless noted)
- 1941–1945: Tennessee
- 1946–1971: Arkansas

Head coaching record
- Overall: 54–22–5
- Bowls: 2–1–1

Accomplishments and honors

Championships
- 1 SWC (1946)

Awards
- Second-team All-American (1927); 2× All-Southern (1926, 1927); SEC Coach of the Year (1944)

John Henry "Barnie" Barnhill (February 23, 1903 – October 21, 1973) was an American football player, coach, and college athletics administrator. He served as the head coach at the University of Tennessee (1941–1945) and the University of Arkansas (1946–1949), compiling a record of 54–22–5.

== Tennessee ==
Barnhill was an All-Southern lineman under coach Robert Neyland at the University of Tennessee, including the SoCon champion 1927 team.

== Coaching and administrative career ==
Barnhill was the head coach for the University of Tennessee for four seasons from 1941 to 1945. He coached the team during World War II, managing the squad during the absence of General Robert Neyland, who left for the war. During that period he led Tennessee to a record of 32–5–2.

In 1946, after Neyland's return to Tennessee, Barnhill was hired by the University of Arkansas as both head football coach and athletic director. Barnhill gave up the head coaching position in 1949 after being diagnosed with multiple sclerosis. He continued as athletic director at Arkansas until 1971 and was responsible for hiring head coach Frank Broyles, who ultimately replaced Barnhill as athletic director.

== Death and honors ==
Barnhill died of heart failure on October 21, 1973, at a hospital in Fayetteville, Arkansas.

Barnhill Arena, the former men's basketball and current women's athletic facility at the University of Arkansas, was named for him. Barnhill is a member of both the Arkansas Sports Hall of Fame and the Tennessee Sports Hall of Fame.

== Head coaching record ==
Year	Team	Overall	Conference	Standing	Bowl/playoffs	AP^{#}
Tennessee Volunteers (Southeastern Conference) (1941–1945)
1941	Tennessee	8–2	3–1	2nd		18
1942	Tennessee	9–1–1	4–1	T–2nd	W Sugar	7
1943	No team—World War II					
1944	Tennessee	7–1–1	5–0–1	2nd	L Rose	12
1945	Tennessee	8–1	3–1	2nd		14
Tennessee:		32–5–2	15–3–1			
Arkansas Razorbacks (Southwest Conference) (1946–1949)
1946	Arkansas	6–3–2	5–1	T–1st	T Cotton	16
1947	Arkansas	6–4–1	1–4–1	T–5th	W Dixie	
1948	Arkansas	5–5	2–4	5th		
1949	Arkansas	5–5	2–4	6th		
Arkansas:		22–17–3	10–13–1			
Total:		54–22–5				
National championship Conference title Conference division title or championship game berth
^{#}Rankings from final AP Poll.
