= 1945 Rose Bowl =

American college football game

- 31st Rose Bowl Game
Tennessee Volunteers	USC Trojans
(7–0–1)	(7–0–2)
SEC	PCC
0	25
Head coach: John Barnhill	Head coach: Jeff Cravath
AP 12	AP 7
	1	2	3	4	Total
Tennessee	0	0	0	0	0
USC	6	6	0	13	25
- Date: January 1, 1945
- Season: 1944
- Stadium: Rose Bowl
- Location: Pasadena, California
- Favorite: USC by 17 points
- Referee: J.J. Lynch (SEC; split crew: SEC, Pacific Coast)
- Attendance: 91,000

The 1945 Rose Bowl was the 31st edition of the college football bowl game, played at the Rose Bowl in Pasadena, California, on Monday, January 1. The USC Trojans of the Pacific Coast Conference (PCC) defeated the Tennessee Volunteers of the Southeastern Conference (SEC), 25–0.

== Game summary ==
The game was highlighted by a John Ferraro blocked punt, which was carried by Jim Callanan for a touchdown in the opening minutes of the game. Ferraro went on to become the president of the Los Angeles City Council.

== Scoring ==
=== First quarter ===
- USC – Jim Callanan, 30-yard run (West kick missed)

=== Second quarter ===
- USC – Paul Salata, 22-yard pass from Hardy (West kick missed)

=== Third quarter ===
No scoring

=== Fourth quarter ===
- USC – Jim Hardy, 9-yard run (West kick good)
- USC – Doug MacLachlan, 49-yard pass from Hardy (West kick missed)
