= Chuck Sample =

American football player (1920–2001)

No. 38, 15
- Position: Fullback

Personal information
- Born: January 5, 1920; Green Bay, Wisconsin, U.S.
- Died: May 15, 2001 (aged 81); Appleton, Wisconsin, U.S.
- Listed height: 5 ft 9 in (1.75 m)
- Listed weight: 205 lb (93 kg)

Career information
- High school: Appleton West (Wisconsin)
- College: Toledo

Career history
- Green Bay Packers (1942, 1945)

Career statistics
- Rushes: 59
- Rushing yards: 257
- Touchdowns: 4
- Stats at Pro Football Reference

Charles E. Sample (January 5, 1920 – May 15, 2001) was a player in the National Football League for the Green Bay Packers in 1942 and 1945 as a fullback. He played at the collegiate level at the University of Toledo.

== Biography ==
Sample was born Charles Sample on January 5, 1920, in Green Bay, Wisconsin.
