= 1945 Chicago Bears season =

NFL team season

- Head coach: Hunk Anderson; Luke Johnsos
- Home stadium: Wrigley Field

Results
- Record: 3–7
- Division place: 4th NFL Western
- Playoffs: Did not qualify

The 1945 season was the Chicago Bears' 26th in the National Football League. The team failed to improve on their 6–3–1 record from 1944 and finished at 1–7, under temporary co-coaches Hunk Anderson and Luke Johnsos. With the end of World War II, Halas would make his return to the coaching ranks--winning the bears final 2 games and improving their record to 3–7 so this was the end of the only co-coaching tenure in franchise history.

This was also their first losing season in 16 years, with their last being back in 1929 (they were above .500 every season between 1920 and 1928). And they would not have another, with Halas at the helm, until 1960. Meaning that between 1920 and 1963, Halas had only 2 losing seasons.

== Schedule ==
Week	Date	Opponent	Result	Record	Venue
1	Bye				
2	September 30	at **Green Bay Packers**	**L** 21–31	0–1	City Stadium
3	October 7	at **Cleveland Rams**	**L** 0–17	0–2	League Park
4	October 14	**Chicago Cardinals**	**L** 7–16	0–3	Wrigley Field
5	October 21	**Cleveland Rams**	**L** 21–41	0–4	Wrigley Field
6	October 28	at **Detroit Lions**	**L** 10–16	0–5	Briggs Stadium
7	November 4	**Green Bay Packers**	**W** 28–24	1–5	Wrigley Field
8	November 11	**Detroit Lions**	**L** 28–35	1–6	Wrigley Field
9	November 18	at Washington Redskins	**L** 21–28	1–7	Griffith Stadium
10	November 25	Pittsburgh Steelers	**W** 28–7	2–7	Wrigley Field
11	December 2	at **Chicago Cardinals**	**W** 28–20	3–7	Comiskey Park
12	Bye				
Note: Intra-division opponents are in **bold** text.

== Roster ==
1945 Chicago Bears final roster
**Quarterbacks**: 42 Sid Luckman P/S; 6 Gene Ronzani S; **Backs**: 2 Gary Famiglietti FB/LB; 3 Jim Fordham FB/LB; 8 Hugh Gallarneau RB/CB; 32 Al Grygo RB/CB; 25 Jackie Hunt FB/LB; 44 Bob Margarita RB/CB; 5 George McAfee RB/CB; 4 Tipp Mooney RB/CB; 37 Charlie Mitchell RB/CB; 19 Don Perkins FB/LB	**Linemen/Linebackers**: 1 Lee Artoe T/DT; 46 Al Babartsky T/G/DT; 99 Jim Daniell T/DT; 27 Chuck Drulis G/DG; 17 Pete Gudauskas G/DG/K; 26 Al Hoptowit G/T/DT; 15 Forrest Masterson G/DG; 16 Rudy Mucha C/LB; 20 Fred Mundee C/LB; 13 Frank Ramsey T/DT; 82 Tom Roberts G/T/DT; 66 John Schiechl C/LB; 7 Ed Sprinkle G/DG; 18 Joe Stydahar T/DT; 14 George Zorich G/DG	**Ends/Receivers**: 23 Connie Mack Berry; 51 Ken Kavanaugh; 36 Jack Morton; 51 Rudy Smeja; 30 George Wilson; **Reserve**: 12 Abe Croft E; 57 Ray McLean RB/CB; 29 Bulldog Turner C/LB; Rookies in italics

== Standings ==
NFL Western Division
	W	L	T	PCT	DIV	PF	PA	STK
Cleveland Rams	9	1	0	.900	7–0	244	136	W5
Detroit Lions	7	3	0	.700	5–2	195	194	W1
Green Bay Packers	6	4	0	.600	3–4	258	173	L1
Chicago Bears	3	7	0	.300	2–6	192	235	W2
Chicago Cardinals	1	9	0	.100	1–6	98	228	L6

Note: Tie games were not officially counted in the standings until 1972.
