= Carl M. Voyles =

American football coach, college athletics administrator, and sports executive

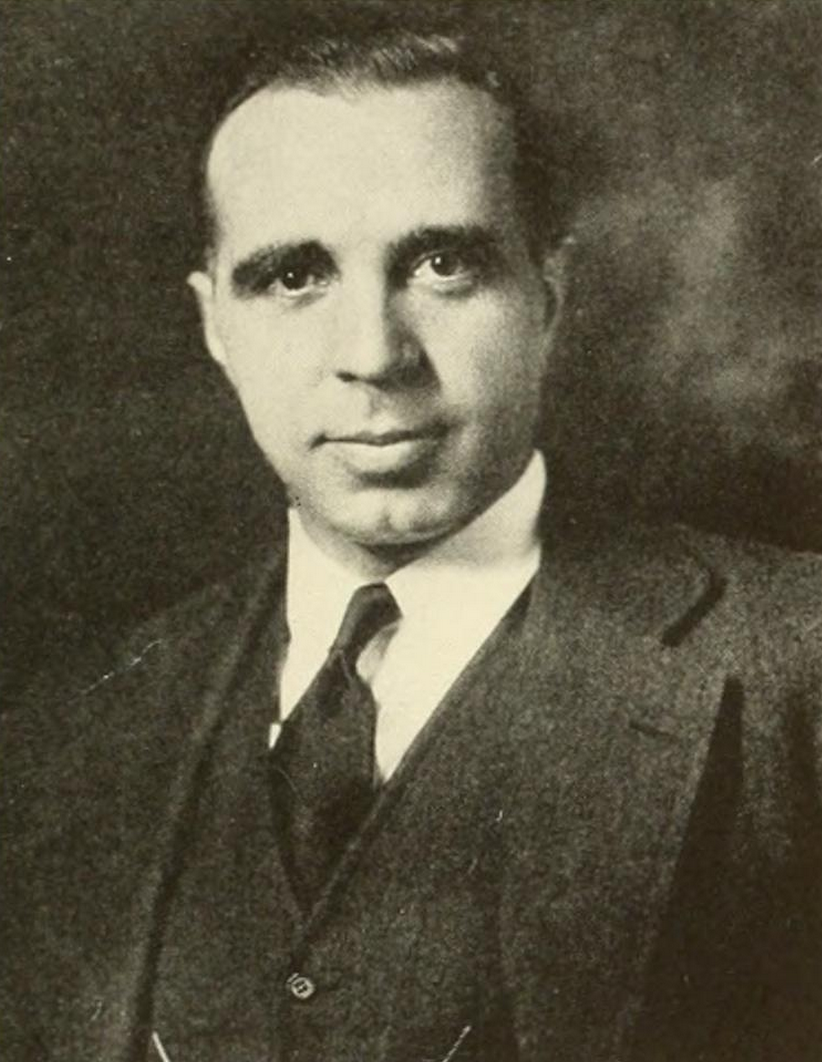
- Voyles pictured in Colonial Echo 1940, William & Mary yearbook

Biographical details
- Born: August 11, 1898; McLoud, Oklahoma, U.S.
- Died: January 11, 1982 (aged 83); Fort Myers, Florida, U.S.

Playing career

Football
- 1917: Oklahoma A&M
- 1919–1920: Oklahoma A&M

Basketball
- 1919–1921: Oklahoma A&M
- Position: End

Coaching career (HC unless noted)

Football
- 1922–1924: Southwestern State (OK)
- 1925–1930: Illinois (assistant)
- 1931–1938: Duke (ends)
- 1939–1943: William & Mary
- 1944–1947: Auburn
- 1948: Brooklyn Dodgers
- 1950–1955: Hamilton Tiger-Cats

Administrative career (AD unless noted)
- 1939–1943: William & Mary
- 1944–1947: Auburn
- 1950–1955: Hamilton Tiger-Cats (GM)

Head coaching record
- Overall: 58–40–3 (college); 2–12 (AAFC); 48–27–1 (CFL)

Accomplishments and honors

Championships
- 1 SoCon (1942); 41st Grey Cup (1953)

Carl Marvin "Dutch" Voyles (August 11, 1898 – January 11, 1982) was an American gridiron football coach, college athletics administrator, and sports executive. He served as the head football coach at Southwestern State Teachers College—now known as Southwestern Oklahoma State University—from 1922 to 1924, at the College of William & Mary from 1939 to 1943, and at Auburn University from 1944 to 1947, compiling a career college football record of 58–40–3. Voyles was the head of the Brooklyn Dodgers of the All-America Football Conference (AAFC) in 1948 and the Hamilton Tiger-Cats of the Canadian Football League (CFL) from 1950 to 1955.

== Coaching career ==
=== William & Mary ===
From 1939 to 1943, Voyles served as the athletic director and head football coach at the College of William & Mary, where he compiled a 29–7–3 record. The William & Mary football team did not play during the 1943 season due to a lack of players. In 1978, he was named to the William & Mary Athletic Hall of Fame along with all the members of his 1942 football team.

=== Auburn ===
From 1944 to 1947, Voyles coached at Auburn University (officially the Alabama Polytechnic Institute), where he compiled a 15–22 record.

=== Brooklyn Dodgers ===
In 1948, Voyles coached the professional football Brooklyn Dodgers of the All-America Football Conference (AAFC) for Branch Rickey. When the team folded in 1949, he was given a position with the Dodgers baseball team.

=== Hamilton Tiger-Cats ===
Voyles was the first head coach and general manager of the Hamilton Tiger-Cats. In his six seasons in Hamilton, he had a 48–27–1 record and won the 1953 Grey Cup. Voyles retired from football after the 1955 season to work as a sales supervisor for a Florida real estate company owned by Toronto stock broker and former Montreal Alouettes owner, Eric Cradock.

== Death ==
Voyles died on January 11, 1982, in Fort Myers, Florida, after a long period of illness.

== Head coaching record ==
=== College ===
Year	Team	Overall	Conference	Standing	Bowl/playoffs	AP^{#}
Southwestern State Bulldogs (Oklahoma Intercollegiate Conference) (1922–1924)
1922	Southwestern State	5–4	4–3	6th		
1923	Southwestern State	4–4	3–3	4th		
1924	Southwestern State	5–3	3–2	4th		
Southwestern State:		14–11	10–8			
William & Mary Indians (Southern Conference) (1939–1942)
1939	William & Mary	6–2–1	2–0–1	T–3rd		
1940	William & Mary	6–2–1	2–1–1	4th		
1941	William & Mary	8–2	4–1	4th		
1942	William & Mary	9–1–1	4–0	1st		14
William & Mary:		29–7–3	12–2–2			
Auburn Tigers (Southeastern Conference) (1944–1947)
1944	Auburn	4–4	0–4	11th		
1945	Auburn	5–5	2–3	T–7th		
1946	Auburn	4–6	1–5	10th		
1947	Auburn	2–7	1–5	11th		
Auburn:		15–22	4–17			
Total:		58–40–3				
National championship Conference title Conference division title or championship game berth
^{#}Rankings from final AP Poll.
