= 1945 Orange Bowl =

American college football game

- 11th Orange Bowl
- Burdine Stadium in Miami, Florida, hosted the Orange Bowl.
Tulsa Golden Hurricane	Georgia Tech Yellow Jackets
(7–2)	(8–2)
MVC	SEC
26	12
Head coach: Henry Frnka	Head coach: William Alexander
	AP T–13
	1	2	3	4	Total
Tulsa	14	0	12	0	26
Georgia Tech	0	0	6	6	12
- Date: January 1, 1945
- Season: 1944
- Stadium: Burdine Stadium
- Location: Miami, Florida
- Referee: K.C. Gerard
- Attendance: 23,279

The 1945 Orange Bowl was a college football postseason bowl game between the Tulsa Golden Hurricane and the Georgia Tech Yellow Jackets.

== Background ==
Tulsa finished 2nd in the Missouri Valley Conference after three consecutive conference championships the previous three seasons. As for the Yellow Jackets, they were Southeastern Conference champions for the second straight year in Alexander's final season as coach, and this was their first Orange bowl appearance since 1940.

== Game summary ==
- Tulsa - Shedlosky 14-yard touchdown pass from Moss (Moss kick)
- Tulsa - Shedlosky 3-yard reverse touchdown run (Moss kick)
- Tulsa - White 65-yard touchdown pass from Moss to Shedlosky, lateral to White (kick failed)
- Georgia Tech - McIntosh 51-yard touchdown pass from Broyles (kick failed)
- Tulsa - Wilson 90-yard kickoff return for touchdown (kick failed)
- Georgia Tech - Taylor 2-yard touchdown run (kick failed)

Frank Broyles threw for 304 yards in a losing effort.

== Aftermath ==
Bobby Dodd took over as the new Yellow Jacket coach, coaching until 1966 while appearing in three Orange Bowls, the first being in 1947 and the last in 1967. As for the Golden Hurricane, they have not reached the Orange Bowl since this game.

One of the notable players in the Orange Bowl is Yellow Jacket Frank Broyles, who later went on to become one of the winningest coaches in Arkansas Razorbacks football history, taking over from 1957 to 1976.

== Statistics ==
Statistics	Tulsa	Georgia Tech
First downs	26	12
Rushing yards	188	40
Passing yards	131	309
Total yards	319	349
Interceptions	0	2
Punts–average	6–38.8	4–25.7
Fumbles–lost	2–1	6–3
Penalties–yards	4–41	1–15
