= 1944 Millsaps Majors football team =

American college football season

1944 Millsaps Majors football
- Conference: Independent
- Record: 3–6
- Head coach: Benjamin O. Van Hook (1st season)
- Home stadium: Tiger Stadium

1944 Southern college football independents records
	Conf.			Overall
Team	W	L	T	W		L		T
Virginia		–		6	–	1	–	2
No. 4 Navy		–		6	–	3	–	0
West Virginia		–		5	–	3	–	1
Millsaps		–		3	–	6	–	0
Delaware State		–		2	–	3	–	0
Tennessee Tech		–		1	–	2	–	0
North Texas Aggies		–		2	–	6	–	0
Miami (FL)		–		1	–	7	–	1
Sewanee		–		0	–	3	–	1
Howard (AL)		–		0	–	5	–	0
Rankings from AP Poll

The 1944 Millsaps Majors football team was an American football team that represented Millsaps College as an independent during the 1944 college football season. In their 1st year under head coach Benjamin O. Van Hook, the team compiled a 3–6 record.

== Schedule ==
Date	Opponent	Site	Result	Attendance	Source
September 23	Howard (AL)	Tiger Stadium; Jackson, MS	W 20–14	5,000	
September 30	Arkansas A&M	Tiger Stadium; Jackson, MS	L 0–43		
October 7	at Mississippi State	Scott Field; Starkville, MS	L 56–0		
October 14	at Alabama	Denny Stadium; Tuscaloosa, AL	L 0–55		
October 21	at Howard (AL)	Legion Field; Birmingham, AL	W 19–7		
November 4	at Southwestern Louisiana	McNaspy Stadium; Lafayette, LA	W 19–0		
November 11	Murray State	Jackson, MS	L 0–20		
November 18	Jackson Army Air Base	Tiger Stadium; Jackson, MS	L 0–13		
November 25	at Murray State	Cutchin Stadium; Murray, KY	L 0–58		
