= Nolan Luhn =

American football player (1921–2011)

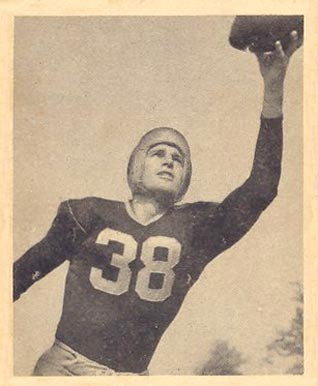
- Luhn on a 1948 Bowman football card

No. 38
- Position: End

Personal information
- Born: July 27, 1921; Kenney, Texas, U.S.
- Died: November 27, 2011 (aged 90); Coffeyville, Kansas, U.S.
- Listed height: 6 ft 3 in (1.91 m)
- Listed weight: 200 lb (91 kg)

Career information
- High school: Bellville (Bellville, Texas)
- College: Tulsa
- NFL draft: 1945: 25th round, 263rd overall pick

Career history

Playing
- Green Bay Packers (1945–1949)

Coaching
- Coffeyville (1968–2003) Volunteer coach

Career NFL statistics
- Receptions: 100
- Receiving yards: 1,525
- Touchdowns: 13
- Stats at Pro Football Reference

Nolan Harry Luhn (July 27, 1921 – November 27, 2011) was an American professional football player who played wide receiver for five seasons for the Green Bay Packers. He was born in Kenney, Texas. Luhn died on November 27, 2011, in Coffeyville, Kansas.

== NFL career statistics ==
Legend
| **Bold** | Career high |

| Year | Team | Games | | Receiving | | | | |
| Year | Team | GP | GS | Rec | Yds | Avg | Lng | TD |
|---|---|---|---|---|---|---|---|---|
| 1945 | GNB | 9 | 4 | 10 | 151 | 15.1 | **44** | 1 |
| 1946 | GNB | 11 | 8 | 16 | 224 | 14.0 | 36 | 2 |
| 1947 | GNB | 12 | 9 | **42** | **696** | 16.6 | **44** | **7** |
| 1948 | GNB | 12 | 8 | 17 | 285 | **16.8** | 40 | 2 |
| 1949 | GNB | 12 | 9 | 15 | 169 | 11.3 | 30 | 1 |
| Career | | 56 | 38 | 100 | 1,525 | 15.3 | 44 | 13 |
