= Clyde Goodnight =

American football player (1924–2002)

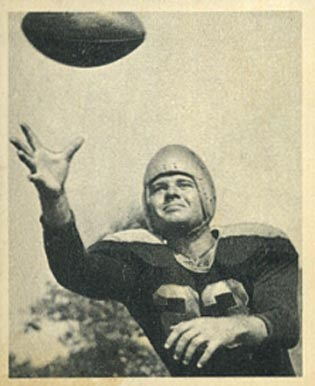
- Goodnight on a 1948 Bowman football card

No. 23, 38, 87
- Position: End

Personal information
- Born: March 3, 1924; Holland, Texas, U.S.
- Died: December 28, 2002 (aged 78); Little River-Academy, Texas, U.S.
- Listed height: 6 ft 1 in (1.85 m)
- Listed weight: 196 lb (89 kg)

Career information
- High school: Holland
- College: Tulsa (1941-1944)
- NFL draft: 1945: 3rd round, 27th overall pick

Career history
- Green Bay Packers (1945–1949); Washington Redskins (1949-1950)

Career NFL statistics
- Receptions: 112
- Receiving yards: 1,967
- Touchdowns: 15
- Stats at Pro Football Reference

Clyde Davis Goodnight (March 3, 1924 – December 28, 2002) was an American professional football end in the National Football League (NFL) for the Green Bay Packers and the Washington Redskins. He played college football at the University of Tulsa and was drafted 27th overall in the third round of the 1945 NFL draft.

Goodnight played the 1945 season alongside Packer great and Pro Football Hall of Famer Don Hutson, and led the team in receiving in 1946 and 1948 after Hutson retired. He was released after the 1949 season opener, and played the rest of the 1949 and 1950 seasons with Washington. Throughout his career, both in Green Bay and Washington, he was often paired with fellow Tulsa alumnus Nolan Luhn, as part of the "Tulsa Twins".
