= Ben Starret =

American football player (1917–1982)

Profile
- Position: Back

Personal information
- Born: November 19, 1917; Santa Rosa, California, U.S.
- Died: January 10, 1982 (aged 64); Burnt Ranch, California, U.S.

Career information
- College: Saint Mary's (CA)

Career history
- Pittsburgh Steelers (1941); Green Bay Packers (1942–1945)

Awards and highlights
- NFL champion (1944)

Career statistics
- Rushing att-yards: 23-57
- Receptions-yards: 1-6
- Touchdowns: 2
- Stats at Pro Football Reference

Benjamin L. Starret (November 19, 1917 – January 10, 1982) was an American football back in the National Football League (NFL) who played for the Pittsburgh Steelers and the Green Bay Packers. Starret played collegiate ball for Saint Mary's College of California and played professionally in the NFL for 5 seasons. He retired in 1945.
