= Tiny Croft =

American football player (1920–1977)

No. 75
- Position: Tackle

Personal information
- Born: November 7, 1920; Chicago, Illinois, U.S.
- Died: January 22, 1977 (aged 56); Woodruff, Wisconsin, U.S.
- Listed height: 6 ft 3 in (1.91 m)
- Listed weight: 287 lb (130 kg)

Career information
- High school: Steinmetz (Chicago)
- College: Alabama; Ripon (1938–1941)
- NFL draft: 1942: 20th round, 186th overall pick

Career history
- Green Bay Packers (1942–1947)

Awards and highlights
- NFL champion (1944)

Career NFL statistics
- Games played: 51
- Games started: 11
- Fumble recoveries: 4
- Stats at Pro Football Reference

Milburn Russell "Tiny" Croft (November 7, 1920 – January 22, 1977) was an American professional football offensive tackle in the National Football League (NFL) for the Green Bay Packers from 1942 to 1947. He played college football at Ripon College and the University of Alabama. Croft was selected by the Washington Redskins in the 20th round of the 1942 NFL draft. He won the 1944 NFL Championship with the Packers.

== Early life and education ==
Croft was born on November 7, 1920 in Chicago, Illinois, and graduated from Steinmetz High School. While there, he was selected to an all-star team of high school players from Chicago to travel to Arizona for a game against an all-star team of Phoenix area players. Croft then began attending Ripon College. Despite his size, Croft was known to be gentle on the football field. Trying to stop this, the Ripon coaches set up a boxing match with a semi-professional boxer who punched Croft in the nose, angering him. This experience was seen as a turning point in his athletic career as he became more aggressive. Croft went on to become a three-year starter as a lineman for the Ripon Red Hawks, earning first-team All-Midwest Conference in three consecutive years. He played placekicker for the team. He also played college football for the Alabama Crimson Tide.

== Professional career ==
After finishing his college career, Croft was drafted as the 186th overall pick in the 20th round of the 1942 NFL draft by the Washington Redskins. He was the heaviest rookie in the NFL, until Ed Neal was signed by the Green Bay Packers. Croft was acquired by the Packers during his first training camp before he had a chance to play a league game for Washington. He won the 1944 NFL Championship with the Packers. Croft would go on to play for the Packers until 1947. While with the Packers, he played as a right or left tackle in 51 games, 11 of which he started. During his career, he was 6 feet 3 inches tall and weighed 287 pounds.

== Personal life ==
While not playing football, Croft worked in Sturgeon Bay, Wisconsin. In his freshman year, he wrote to actress Ann Sheridan to invite her to his college's prom. Sheridan wrote back to him, declining the invitation. However, she did send a signed picture inscribed with "To Milburn from Ann". Four other college "Glamor Boys" also invited actresses, with Croft being the only one to get a personal response. He married Myra Ann Wasserburger, a fellow Ripon graduate and an English teacher in 1943. He was a district manager for American Motors. He died of a heart attack on January 22, 1977, at age 56 in Woodruff, Wisconsin.
