= Leo Cantor =

American football player (1919–1995)

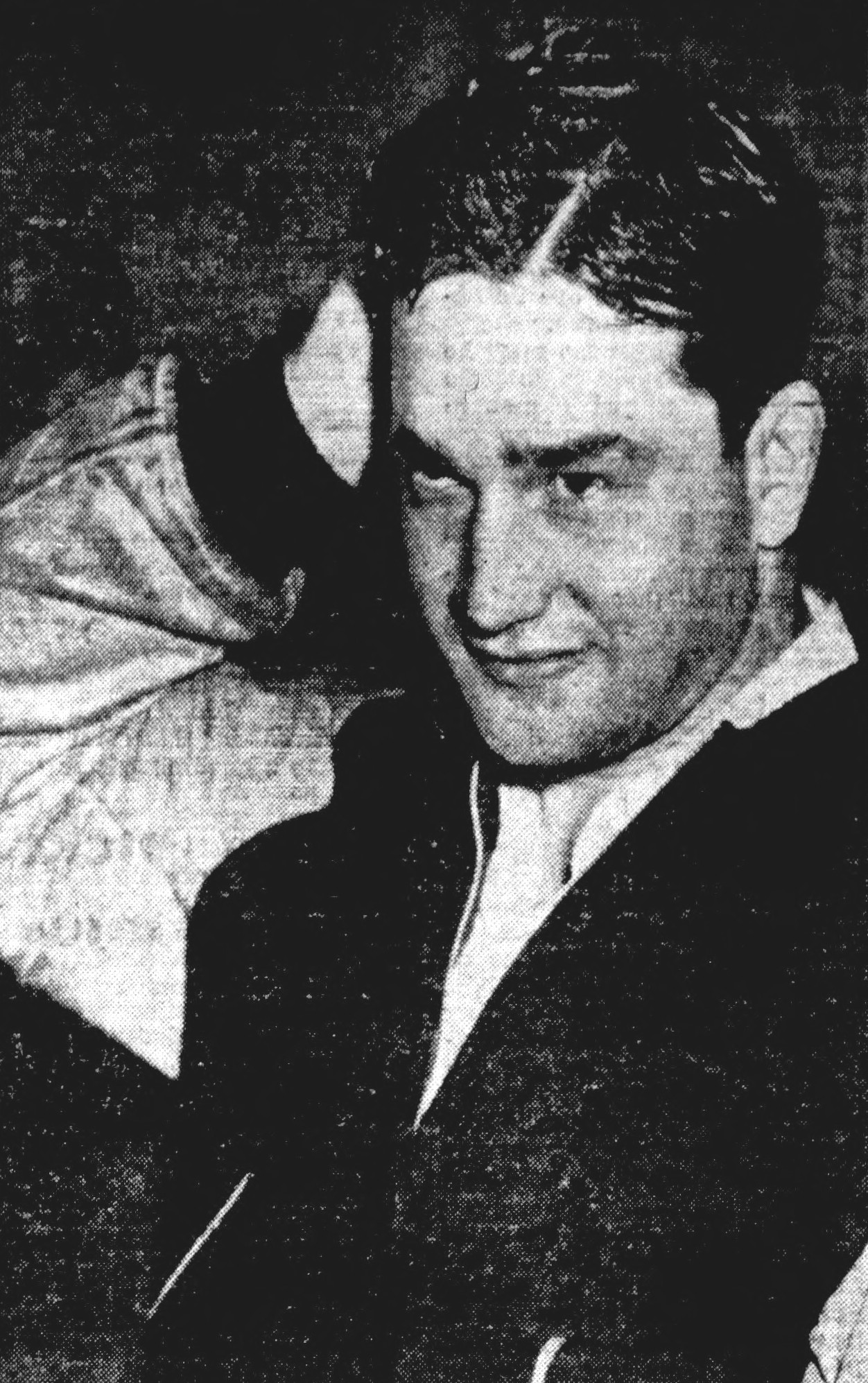
- Cantor, circa 1945

Profile
- Position: Running back

Personal information
- Born: February 28, 1919; Chicago, Illinois, U.S.
- Died: June 4, 1995 (aged 76); Los Angeles, California, U.S.
- Listed height: 6 ft 0 in (1.83 m)
- Listed weight: 195 lb (88 kg)

Career information
- High school: Los Angeles (CA) Theodore Roosevelt
- College: UCLA

Career history
- New York Giants (1942); Chicago Cardinals (1945)
- Stats at Pro Football Reference

Leo "the Lion" Cantor (February 28, 1919 – June 4, 1995) was a Jewish American football player. He was the 1937 Los Angeles All-City quarterback recipient, played college football for the UCLA Bruins, and played in the National Football League for the New York Giants in 1942 and the Chicago Cardinals in 1945.

== Biography ==
Cantor was born on the West Side of Chicago, Illinois, and grew up in the Boyle Heights neighborhood of Los Angeles, California. His older brother was UCLA football player Izzy Cantor and his younger brother was USC football player Albert Canter. He attended Theodore Roosevelt High School in Los Angeles, where he was the 1937 Los Angeles All-City quarterback recipient and leading scorer, playing in the Northern League.

USC Trojans football coach Howard Jones recruited Cantor to attend USC and after briefly attending Spring practice at Troy, Cantor transferred to UCLA. He was the only prep football player coach Howard Jones ever personally recruited. It was at UCLA that Cantor played in the same famed backfield as Kenny Washington, Jackie Robinson, and Woody Strode. Cantor would go on to be a three-year letter winner at UCLA and played for the UCLA Bruins from 1938 to 1941.

Cantor played for the New York Giants in 1942 and, after serving in the US Army Air Corps during World War II, for the Chicago Cardinals in 1945. In 1945 he led the Cardinals in interceptions (5 for 70 yards) and rushing touchdowns (5) and yards/passing attempt (6.44), was second in rushing (83 times for 291 yards) and kick returns (6 for 123 yards), and was third in receptions (15 for 159 yards). Cantor also was player of the game in helping snap the Chicago Cardinals 29-game losing streak by upsetting Sid Luckman and the Chicago Bears at Wrigley Field on October 14, 1945.

In 1945 and 1946, Cantor played for the Hollywood Bears of the Pacific Coast Professional Football League (PCFL), and in 1948 he played for the Los Angeles Bulldogs of the PCFL.

In 1996 Cantor was inducted into the Southern California Jewish Sports Hall of Fame.
