= Ray Apolskis =

American football player (1919–1960)

- Apolskis in 1942

No. 26, 69, 75
- Positions: Center, Guard, Linebacker

Personal information
- Born: October 19, 1919; Cicero, Illinois, U.S.
- Died: June 30, 1960 (aged 40); San Mateo, California, U.S.
- Listed height: 5 ft 10 in (1.78 m)
- Listed weight: 206 lb (93 kg)

Career information
- High school: Fenger Academy (Chicago, Illinois)
- College: Marquette (1937–1940)
- NFL draft: 1941: 5th round, 32nd overall pick

Career history
- Chicago Cardinals (1941–1942, 1945–1950)

Awards and highlights
- NFL champion (1947); Pro Bowl (1941); Second-team All-American (1940)

Career NFL statistics
- Games played: 75
- Starts: 35
- Interceptions: 6
- Fumble recoveries: 4
- Stats at Pro Football Reference

Raymond Edward Apolskis (October 19, 1919 – June 30, 1960) was an American professional football player who was an offensive lineman in the National Football League (NFL). He played eight seasons for the Chicago Cardinals and served in the U.S. Marine Corps during World War II.

== Early life ==
Apolskis was born in Cicero, Illinois, and grew up in Chicago. He graduated from Fenger High School, where he earned eleven varsity letters in football, basketball, baseball, and swimming.

== College career ==
He played college football for the Marquette Golden Avalanche where he was elected team captain as a sophomore.

Apolskis entered his senior season in 1940 heralded as one of the top centers in the nation. His coach, Paddy Driscoll, said of the solid son of Lithuanian immigrants: "Tell me everything that a center should do well and I'll tell you just what Apolskis can do. He's best on defense, roaming around against running plays and intercepting passes, but he is as good as they come in other departments, too."

Apolskis was selected in the fifth round of the 1941 NFL draft by the Cardinals, who made him the 32nd overall pick of the draft.

== Professional career ==
Apolskis began his NFL career in the 1941 NFL season, when the league used the one-platoon system, with players playing on both the offensive and defensive side of the ball. He was a starter as a rookie for the 1941 Cardinals.

He missed the 1943 and 1944 seasons due to World War II and service in the United States Marine Corps. Apolskis returned to play in the 1945 season and was a member of the 1947 team that won the last NFL Championship for the franchise. Although by this time the NFL had liberalized its substitution rules, making way for the two-platoon system, Apolskis continued to play both as a center on offensive and a middle guard on defense.

On June 15, 1950, Apolskis suffered acute appendicitis and underwent an emergency appendectomy in Chicago, which was successful. This surgery proved to be only a temporary setback, however, and in September Apolskis signed a contract with the Cardinals for what would be an eighth season in the NFL.

He retired after the 1950 season.

== Life after football ==
In February 1951, Apolskis was selected for promotion to the rank of captain in the Marine Corps Reserve.

After football, Apolskis worked for a steel company in San Mateo, California.

== Death and legacy ==
He died of a heart attack at the age of 40 in 1960.
