= 1944 Georgia Bulldogs football team =

American college football season

1944 Georgia Bulldogs football
- Conference: Southeastern Conference
- Record: 7–3 (4–2 SEC)
- Head coach: Wally Butts (6th season)
- Home stadium: Sanford Stadium

1944 Southeastern Conference football standings
| | Conf. | | | | | Overall |
| Team | | W | | L | | | W | | L |
|---|---|---|---|---|---|---|---|---|---|---|
| No. T–13 Georgia Tech $ | 4 | – | 0 | – | 0 | 8 | – | 3 | – | 0 |
| No. 12 Tennessee | 5 | – | 0 | – | 1 | 7 | – | 1 | – | 1 |
| Georgia | 4 | – | 2 | – | 0 | 7 | – | 3 | – | 0 |
| Alabama | 3 | – | 1 | – | 2 | 5 | – | 2 | – | 2 |
| Mississippi State | 3 | – | 2 | – | 0 | 6 | – | 2 | – | 0 |
| LSU | 2 | – | 3 | – | 1 | 2 | – | 5 | – | 1 |
| Ole Miss | 2 | – | 3 | – | 0 | 2 | – | 6 | – | 0 |
| Tulane | 1 | – | 2 | – | 0 | 4 | – | 3 | – | 0 |
| Kentucky | 1 | – | 5 | – | 0 | 3 | – | 6 | – | 0 |
| Florida | 0 | – | 3 | – | 0 | 4 | – | 3 | – | 0 |
| Auburn | 0 | – | 4 | – | 0 | 4 | – | 4 | – | 0 |
| Vanderbilt | 0 | – | 0 | – | 0 | 3 | – | 0 | – | 1 |
$ – Conference champion; Rankings from AP Poll

The 1944 Georgia Bulldogs football team was an American football team that represented the University of Georgia as a member of the Southeastern Conference (SEC) during the 1944 college football season. In their sixth year under head coach Wally Butts, the Bulldogs compiled an overall record of 7–3, with a conference record of 4–2, and finished third in the SEC.

== Schedule ==
| Date | Opponent | Site | Result | Attendance | Source |
|---|---|---|---|---|---|
| September 29 | Wake Forest* | Sanford Stadium; Athens, GA | L 7–14 | 8,500 | |
| October 6 | Presbyterian* | Sanford Stadium; Athens, GA | W 67–0 | | |
| October 13 | Kentucky | Sanford Stadium; Athens, GA | W 13–12 | 9,000 | |
| October 20 | Daniel Field* | Sanford Stadium; Athens, GA | W 53–6 | 3,000 | |
| October 28 | vs. LSU | Grant Field; Atlanta, GA | L 7–15 | | |
| November 4 | at No. 19 Alabama | Legion Field; Birmingham, AL (rivalry) | W 14–7 | 22,000 | |
| November 11 | vs. Florida | Fairfield Stadium; Jacksonville, FL (rivalry) | W 38–12 | 18,000 | |
| November 18 | vs. Auburn | Memorial Stadium; Columbus, GA (rivaley) | W 49–13 | 20,000 | |
| November 24 | Clemson* | Sanford Stadium; Athens, GA (rivalry) | W 21–7 | 3,500 | |
| December 2 | Georgia Tech^{†} | Sanford Stadium; Athens, GA (rivalry) | L 0–44 | 26,000 | |
*Non-conference game; ^{†}Homecoming; Rankings from AP Poll released prior to the game
