= Frank Seno =

American football player (1921–1974)

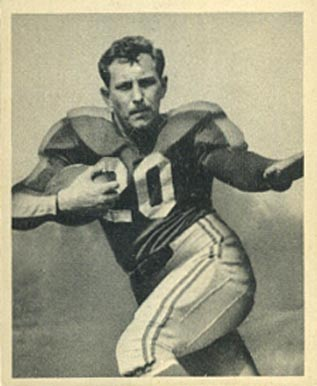
- Seno on a 1948 Bowman football card

No. 25
- Positions: Running back, defensive back

Personal information
- Born: February 15, 1921; Mendota, Illinois, U.S.
- Died: March 31, 1974 (aged 53); Bellwood, Illinois, U.S.

Career information
- College: George Washington

Career history
- 1943–1944: Washington Redskins
- 1945–1946: Chicago Cardinals
- 1947–1948: Boston Yanks
- 1949: Washington Redskins
- Stats at Pro Football Reference

Frank Seno (February 15, 1921 – March 31, 1974) was an American professional football running back and defensive back in the National Football League (NFL) for the Washington Redskins, Chicago Cardinals, and Boston Yanks. He attended George Washington University.
