= Bob Flowers =

American football player (1917–1962)

Profile
- Position: Center

Personal information
- Born: August 6, 1917; Big Spring, Texas, U.S.
- Died: December 8, 1962 (aged 45); Big Spring, Texas, U.S.
- Listed height: 6 ft 1 in (1.85 m)
- Listed weight: 210 lb (95 kg)

Career information
- College: Texas, Texas Tech, Tulane

Career history
- Green Bay Packers (1942–1949)

Awards and highlights
- NFL champion (1944)
- Stats at Pro Football Reference

Robert O. C. Flowers (August 7, 1917 – December 8, 1962) was an American football center who won an NFL Championship during eight seasons with the Green Bay Packers. Prior to that he played college football at Texas Tech and was a captain of his high school football team in Big Spring, Texas.

Born in Big Spring, Texas, on August 17, 1917, he emerged as a standout defensive player in high school. He first played freshman football at the University of Texas in 1935, but then enrolled at Texas Tech in 1936. He played linebacker and blocking back for a short time at Texas Tech and also made a stab at Tulane, but he never earned a varsity letter at any school. In 1937 he played for the Big Spring Spartans, the town's independent team, but a year later he was working in the oil business. His 1940 draft card listed him as a student at Texas Tech, but the school's enrollment records do not verify this. When he was hired by the Packers in 1942, to fill holes left by World War II, they said he had been working in California, but there are no records of him living anywhere but Big Spring.

He made his pro debut in game 3 of the 1942 season (5 years after his last recorded football game) and, despite his unlikely background, went on to play for the Packers for 8 seasons under coach Curly Lambeau who converted him to a center. He was known for his aggressive play.

During his time in Green Bay, he played in 63 games, started 17 and had 66 interceptions for 33 yards total.

Flowers was one of four brothers to serve as captain of the Big Spring football team. Of them Bill Flowers went on to be a backfield player for Tulane

After retiring from football he sold cars and then worked in the farming and ranching business with his sister.

He died on December 8, 1962, the result of an accidental self-shooting.
