= Don Wells =

American football player (1922–1984)

No. 43
- Positions: Defensive end, end

Personal information
- Born: July 12, 1922; Waycross, Georgia, U.S.
- Died: February 14, 1984 (aged 61); Stuart, Florida, U.S.
- Listed height: 6 ft 2 in (1.88 m)
- Listed weight: 200 lb (91 kg)

Career information
- High school: Fort Pierce (Fort Pierce, Florida)
- College: Wake Forest; North Carolina; Georgia
- NFL draft: 1945: 6th round, 54th overall pick

Career history
- Green Bay Packers (1946–1949)

Career NFL statistics
- Receptions: 2
- Receiving yards: 74
- Fumble recoveries: 5
- Stats at Pro Football Reference

Donald Wells (July 12, 1922 – February 14, 1984) was an American professional football player for the Green Bay Packers of the National Football League (NFL). Wells was born on July 12, 1922, in Waycross, Georgia. He graduated from Fort Pierce Westwood Academy in Florida before attending the University of Georgia where he played for their football team. In addition to his position as an end, Wells was also the team's placekicker.

Wells was drafted by Green Bay in the sixth round of the 1945 NFL draft. He played in all 11 games that season, starting in 3 of them and playing on offense as an end and on defense as a defensive end. Wells injured his knee prior to the 1947 NFL season, however he was still able to participate in every game that year. After the season, his injury required surgery. Right before the start of the 1948 NFL season, Wells was involved in an altercation at bar. He was arrested and pleaded guilty to drunk and disorderly conduct resulting in a fine of $16.82. Before this altercation, the Packers had fined Wells $250 for insubordination. After signing Wells for the 1949 NFL season, coach Curly Lambeau stated that "Wells is one of the better defensive ends in the circuit" and went on to highlight that "he never stops fighting on that field".

The Packers placed Wells on waivers partway through the 1949 season after he decided to retire due to injury. In total, he played 38 games over 4 seasons with the Packers, recording 2 receptions for 74 yards on offense and 5 fumbles recovered on defense. After his career with the Packers, Wells coached a semi-pro football team called the Fort Pierce Raiders. Near the end of 1949, Wells was injured after he crashed his car into a concrete bridge structure.
