= Ed Neal =

American football player (1918–1984)

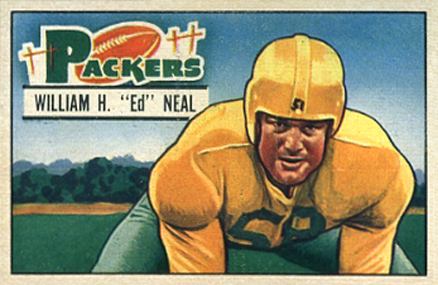
- Neal on a 1951 Bowman football card

No. 58
- Position: Defensive tackle

Personal information
- Born: December 31, 1918; Wichita Falls, Texas, U.S.
- Died: December 27, 1984 (aged 65); Wichita Falls, Texas, U.S.
- Listed height: 6 ft 4 in (1.93 m)
- Listed weight: 285 lb (129 kg)

Career information
- High school: Wichita Falls
- College: Ouachita Baptist, Tulane, LSU

Career history
- Green Bay Packers (1945–1951); Chicago Bears (1951)

Awards and highlights
- Pro Bowl (1950)

Career NFL statistics
- Games played: 72
- Touchdowns: 1
- Fumbles recovered: 5
- Stats at Pro Football Reference

William Henry Edward Neal (December 31, 1918 – December 27, 1984) was an American professional football player who was a defensive tackle in the National Football League (NFL). He played seven seasons for both the Green Bay Packers and the Chicago Bears in the NFL.
