= List of NFL players (K) =

This is a list of players who have appeared in at least one regular season or postseason game in the National Football League (NFL), American Football League (AFL), or All-America Football Conference (AAFC) and have a last name that starts with "K". This list is accurate through the end of the 2025 NFL season.

== Ka ==
- Vyto Kab
- Mike Kabealo
- John Kacherski
- Jeff Kacmarek
- Isaiah Kacyvenski
- Michael Kaczmarek
- Nick Kaczur
- Josh Kaddu
- Dave Kadela
- Max Kadesky
- Mike Kadish
- Ron Kadziel
- Nate Kaeding
- Colin Kaepernick
- Mort Kaer
- Kevin Kaesviharn
- Kurt Kafentzis
- Mark Kafentzis
- Mike Kafka
- Cy Kahl
- Bob Kahler
- Royal Kahler
- Ed Kahn
- Ale Kaho
- Karl Kaimer
- Joshua Kaindoh
- Jason Kaiser
- John Kaiser
- George Kakasic
- Ike Kakela
- Jim Kalafat
- Peter Kalambayi
- Matt Kalil
- Ryan Kalil
- Dave Kalina
- Nikola Kalinic
- Kyle Kalis
- Todd Kalis
- Nick Kallerup
- Ed Kallina
- Tommy Kalmanir
- Bob Kalsu
- Joshua Kalu
- N. D. Kalu
- Ufomba Kamalu
- John Kamana
- Lew Kamanu
- Alvin Kamara
- Azur Kamara
- Mohamed Kamara
- Sam Kamara
- Larry Kaminski
- Carl Kammerer
- Jim Kamp
- Bob Kampa
- Aaron Kampman
- Hunter Kampmoyer
- Calijah Kancey
- Carl Kane
- George Kane
- Herb Kane
- Jim Kane
- Rick Kane
- Sanoussi Kane
- Tommy Kane
- Danny Kanell
- Jim Kanicki
- Joe Kantor
- Al Kanya
- John Kapele
- Jeremy Kapinos
- Bernie Kapitansky
- Ave Kaplan
- Bernie Kaplan
- Ken Kaplan
- Sam Kaplan
- Carl Kaplanoff
- Al Kaporch
- Joe Kapp
- Alex Kapter
- George Karamatic
- Emil Karas
- Bob Karch
- Jim Karcher
- Ken Karcher
- John Karcis
- Khalid Kareem
- Carl Karilivacz
- Deji Karim
- George Karlaftis III
- Rich Karlis
- Mike Karmazin
- Mike Karney
- Abe Karnofsky
- Keith Karpinski
- Ed Karpowich
- Bill Karr
- Alex Karras
- Johnny Karras
- Lou Karras
- Ted Karras (born 1934)
- Ted Karras Jr. (born 1964)
- Ted Karras (born 1993)
- John Karrs
- George Karstens
- Joshua Karty
- Keith Kartz
- Jack Karwales
- Nick Kasa
- Mike Kasap
- John Kasay
- Drew Kaser
- Alain Kashama
- Tony Kaska
- Matt Kaskey
- Ed Kasky
- Cy Kasper
- Kevin Kasper
- Dick Kasperek
- Chuck Kassel
- Brad Kassell
- Karl Kassulke
- Leo Katalinas
- Jim Katcavage
- Joe Katchik
- Norm Katnik
- Mike Katolin
- Mike Katrishen
- Eric Kattus
- Matt Katula
- Andy Katzenmoyer
- Kani Kauahi
- John Kauffman
- Jake Kaufman
- Mel Kaufman
- Napoleon Kaufman
- Bronson Kaufusi
- Steve Kaufusi
- Thom Kaumeyer
- Jerry Kauric
- Ken Kavanaugh
- George Kavel
- Eddie Kaw
- Ed Kawal
- Bill Kay
- Clarence Kay
- Rick Kay
- Muadianvita Kazadi
- Damontae Kazee

== Ke ==
- Duce Keahey
- Jim Keane
- Tom Keane
- Jim Kearney
- Tim Kearney
- Tom Kearns
- Frank Kearse
- Jayron Kearse
- Jermaine Kearse
- Jevon Kearse
- Tim Kearse
- Zak Keasey
- Michael Keathley
- Bill Keating
- Chris Keating
- Tom Keating
- Curtis Keaton
- Stan Keck
- Val Keckin
- Dan Kecman
- Jerry Keeble
- Joe Keeble
- Emmett Keefe
- Jackson Keefer
- Jerry Keefe
- Trevor Keegan
- Mark Keel
- Ray Keeling
- Rex Keeling
- Rabbit Keen
- Ed Keenan
- Jack Keenan
- Bob Keene
- Dalton Keene
- Brad Keeney
- Jakobie Keeney-James
- Case Keenum
- Bryson Keeton
- Durwood Keeton
- Carl Keever
- Stanford Keglar
- Bryan Kehl
- Scott Kehoe
- Rick Kehr
- Freddy Keiaho
- Mike Keim
- Brett Keisel
- Thomas Keiser
- Brandon Keith
- Craig Keith
- John Keith
- Kenton Keith
- Gary Keithley
- Nick Keizer
- Kingsley Keke
- Jim Kekeris
- Jason Kelce
- Travis Kelce
- Louie Kelcher
- Senio Kelemete
- Paul Kell
- Bill Kellagher
- Bill Kellar
- Mark Kellar
- Scott Kellar
- Dustin Keller
- Ken Keller
- Larry Keller
- Mike Keller
- Ernie Kellermann
- Doug Kellermeyer
- Bill Kelley
- Bob Kelly (born 1925)
- Bob Kelley (born 1930)
- Brian Kelley
- Chris Kelley
- Doc Kelley
- Ed Kelley
- Edward Kelley
- Ethan Kelley
- Frank Kelley
- Gorden Kelley
- Ike Kelley
- Joshua Kelley
- Leslie Kelley
- Mike Kelley (born 1959)
- Mike Kelley (born 1962)
- Robert Kelley
- Lyons Kelliher
- Kevin Kellin
- John Kellison
- Kellogg
- Bill Kellogg
- Bob Kellogg
- Clarence Kellogg
- Mike Kellogg
- Marv Kellum
- Ben Kelly
- Bill Kelly
- Bob Kelly
- Brian Kelly
- Chad Kelly
- Dennis Kelly
- Derrick Kelly II
- Ellison Kelly
- Elmo Kelly
- Eric Kelly
- Jeff Kelly
- Jim Kelly (born 1942)
- Jim Kelly (born 1951)
- Jim Kelly (born 1960)
- Jimmy Kelly
- Joe Kelly
- John Kelly (born 1944)
- John Kelly (born 1996)
- Kameron Kelly
- Kyu Blu Kelly
- Leroy Kelly
- Lewis Kelly
- Malcolm Kelly
- Maurice Kelly
- Mike Kelly
- Pat Kelly
- Reggie Kelly
- Rob Kelly
- Ryan Kelly
- Shipwreck Kelly
- Tex Kelly
- Todd Kelly
- Tommy Kelly
- Larry Kelm
- Chad Kelsay
- Chris Kelsay
- Mose Kelsch
- Matt Kelsh
- Mark Kelso
- Chris Kemoeatu
- Ma'ake Kemoeatu
- Bobby Kemp
- Jack Kemp
- Jeff Kemp
- Marcus Kemp
- Perry Kemp
- Ray Kemp
- Florian Kempf
- Charlie Kempinska
- Herb Kempton
- Anthony Kendall
- Charlie Kendall
- Drew Kendall
- Pete Kendall
- Derion Kendrick
- Jim Kendrick
- Vince Kendrick
- Eric Kendricks
- Lance Kendricks
- Mychal Kendricks
- Matt Keneley
- John Kenerson
- Mike Kenn
- Derek Kennard
- Devon Kennard
- George Kennard
- Ken Kennard
- Kyle Kennard
- George Kenneally
- Allan Kennedy
- Bill Kennedy
- Bob Kennedy
- Bob Kennedy (born 1928)
- Cortez Kennedy
- Jimmie Kennedy
- Jimmy Kennedy (born 1900)
- Jimmy Kennedy (born 1979)
- Kenoy Kennedy
- Lincoln Kennedy
- Mike Kennedy
- Sam Kennedy
- Tom Kennedy (born 1920)
- Tom Kennedy (born 1938)
- Tom Kennedy (born 1996)
- Bill Kenney
- Steve Kenney
- Eddie Kennison
- Greg Kent
- Joey Kent
- Jordan Kent
- Rashod Kent
- William C. Kenyon
- Shiloh Keo
- Crawford Ker
- Nick Kerasiotis
- Randy Kerbow
- Bob Kercher
- Dick Kercher
- Ralph Kercheval
- Zac Kerin
- Gary Kerkorian
- Jeremy Kerley
- Bill Kern
- Brett Kern
- Chris Kern
- Don Kern
- Rex Kern
- Marlon Kerner
- Patrick Kerney
- John Kerns
- Graham Kernwein
- Bill Kerr
- George Kerr
- Jim Kerr
- Zach Kerr
- Joe Kerridge
- Mike Kerrigan
- Ryan Kerrigan
- Tom Kerrigan
- Merritt Kersey
- George Kershaw
- William Kershaw
- Wally Kersten
- Bob Keseday
- Cody Kessler
- Alex Kessman
- Alex Ketzko
- Ken Keuper
- Arden Key
- David Key
- Devon Key
- Wade Key
- Bob Keyes
- Jimmy Keyes
- Josh Keyes
- Leroy Keyes
- Marcus Keyes
- Thakarius Keyes
- Austin Keys
- Brady Keys
- Howard Keys
- Isaac Keys
- Tyrone Keys
- Ramel Keyton
- Jon Keyworth

== Kh–Ki ==
- Bob Khayat
- Ed Khayat
- Bill Kibler
- Jacob Kibodi
- Walt Kichefski
- Billy Kidd
- Carl Kidd
- John Kidd
- Keith Kidd
- Lewis Kidd
- Darvin Kidsy
- Ko Kieft
- Blair Kiel
- Terrence Kiel
- Max Kielbasa
- Howard Kieley
- Walt Kiesling
- Jeff Kiewel
- Amari Kight
- Danny Kight
- Kelvin Kight
- George Kiick
- Jim Kiick
- Hau'oli Kikaha
- Warren Kilbourne
- Bob Kilcullen
- Roger Joseph Kiley
- Darius Kilgo
- Daniel Kilgore
- Jon Kilgore
- Miles Killebrew
- Terry Killens
- Charlie Killett
- Gene Killian
- Glenn Killinger
- Cedric Killings
- Adrian Killins
- Pat Killorin
- Billy Kilmer
- Ethan Kilmer
- Bucko Kilroy
- David Kilson
- Bobby Kimball
- Bruce Kimball
- Bill Kimber
- Frank Kimble
- Garry Kimble
- Elbert Kimbrough
- John Kimbrough (born 1918)
- John Kimbrough (born 1954)
- Tony Kimbrough
- J. D. Kimmel
- Jamie Kimmel
- Jerry Kimmel
- Jon Kimmel
- Ola Kimrin
- Billy Kinard
- Bruiser Kinard
- George Kinard
- Terry Kinard
- Keylon Kincade
- Dalton Kincaid
- Jim Kincaid
- Brian Kinchen
- Todd Kinchen
- Kamren Kinchens
- Randy Kinder
- George Kinderdine
- Shine Kinderdine
- Walt Kinderdine
- Keith Kinderman
- Howard Kindig
- Greg Kindle
- Sergio Kindle
- Solomon Kindley
- Derrick Kindred
- Bill Kindricks
- Don Kindt
- Don Kindt, Jr.
- George Kinek
- Michael Kinek
- Corey Kiner
- Steve Kiner
- King
- Akeem King
- Andre King
- Andy King
- Angelo King
- Austin King
- Brandon King (born 1987)
- Brandon King (born 1993)
- Bruce King
- Carlos King
- Charlie King
- Claude King
- David King (born 1963)
- David King (born 1989)
- Deon King
- Desmond King
- Dick King
- Don King (born 1929)
- Don King (born 1964)
- Ed King (born 1925)
- Ed King (born 1969)
- Emanuel King
- Emmett King
- Eric King
- Fay King
- Fred King
- Gordon King
- Gus King
- Henry King
- Horace King
- Jarriel King
- Jeff King
- Jerome King
- Joe King
- Justin King
- Kalen King
- Kenny King (born 1957)
- Kenny King (born 1981)
- Kevin King
- Kobe King
- Lamar King
- Linden King
- Marquette King
- Mitch King
- Phil King
- Ralph King
- Rip King
- Shaun King
- Shawn King
- Steve King
- Tavarres King
- Tim King
- Tony King
- Vick King
- Ellsworth Kingery
- Wayne Kingery
- Rick Kingrea
- Kliff Kingsbury
- Doug Kingsriter
- Jarrett Kingston
- Javon Kinlaw
- Reggie Kinlaw
- Darian Kinnard
- Larry Kinnebrew
- Erron Kinney
- George Kinney
- Jeff Kinney
- Kelvin Kinney
- Steve Kinney
- Vince Kinney
- Carl Kinscherf
- Mason Kinsey
- Matt Kinzer
- Charles Kirby
- Jack Kirby
- John Kirby
- Terry Kirby
- Kelly Kirchbaum
- Bill Kirchiro
- Mark Kirchner
- David Kircus
- Christian Kirk
- Ernest Kirk
- George Kirk
- Ken Kirk
- Luther Kirk
- Randy Kirk
- Heinie Kirkgard
- B'Ho Kirkland
- Denver Kirkland
- Jaxson Kirkland
- Levon Kirkland
- Mike Kirkland
- Frank Kirkleski
- Red Kirkman
- Dre Kirkpatrick
- Christian Kirksey
- Jon Kirksey
- Roy Kirksey
- William Kirksey
- Keith Kirkwood
- Jammie Kirlew
- Gary Kirner
- Lou Kirouac
- Travis Kirschke
- David Kirtman
- Mike Kiselak
- Jack Kiser
- Micah Kiser
- Paul Kiser
- Ben Kish
- George Kisiday
- Adolph Kissell
- Ed Kissell
- John Kissell
- Veto Kissell
- Ishmaa'ily Kitchen
- Jon Kitna
- Syd Kitson
- Paul Kitteredge
- George Kittle
- Kurt Kittner
- Jim Kitts
- Dutch Kitzmiller
- Mathias Kiwanuka
- DeShone Kizer
- Lee Kizzire

== Kl–Kn ==
- Earl Klapstein
- John Klasnic
- Fee Klaus
- Dick Klawitter
- Dan Klecko
- Joe Klecko
- A. J. Klein
- Bob Klein
- Dick Klein
- Elijah Klein
- Perry Klein
- Jim Kleinsasser
- Adrian Klemm
- Quentin Klenk
- Rocky Klever
- Ed Klewicki
- Adolph Kliebhan
- Tony Klimek
- Alan Kline
- Jiggs Kline
- Josh Kline
- Chuck Klingbeil
- John Klingel
- David Klingler
- Joe Klopfenstein
- Harry Kloppenberg
- Bruce Klosterman
- Don Klosterman
- Mike Klotovich
- Jack Klotz
- Al Klug
- Dave Klug
- Karl Klug
- John Klumb
- Nick Klutka
- Chris Kluwe
- Cole Kmet
- Pete Kmetovic
- Shiner Knab
- Glenn Knack
- Gary Knafelc
- Greg Knafelc
- Ken Knapczyk
- Lindsay Knapp
- Jack Knapper
- Jeff Knapple
- Bill Knecht
- Marshawn Kneeland
- Gayle Knief
- Brandon Knight
- Bryan Knight
- Charlie Knight
- Curt Knight
- David Knight
- Demetrius Knight
- George Knight
- Leander Knight
- Marcus Knight
- Pat Knight
- Qwuantrezz Knight
- Roger Knight
- Sammy Knight
- Shawn Knight
- Steve Knight
- Suge Knight
- Tom Knight
- Tyrice Knight
- Zonovan Knight
- Terrance Knighton
- Kurt Knoff
- Johnny Knolla
- Oscar Knop
- Larry Knorr
- Micah Knorr
- Jake Knott
- Kevin Knowles
- Bill Knox
- Charlie Knox
- Daryl Knox
- Dawson Knox
- Johnny Knox
- Kevin Knox
- Kyle Knox
- Mike Knox
- Ronnie Knox
- Sam Knox
- Gene Knutson
- Steve Knutson

== Ko–Kp ==
- Matt Koart
- Steve Kobolinski
- Mickey Kobrosky
- Aaron Koch
- George Koch
- Greg Koch
- Markus Koch
- Pete Koch
- Polly Koch
- Sam Koch
- Mike Kochel
- Roger Kochman
- Dave Kocourek
- Kris Kocurek
- Joe Kodba
- Vic Koegel
- Warren Koegel
- Bob Koehler
- Marshall Koehn
- Michael Koenen
- Art Koeninger
- Richard Koeper
- Karl Koepfer
- Adam Koets
- Matt Kofler
- Dutch Kohl
- Joe Kohlbrand
- Kader Kohou
- Bob Kohrs
- Mike Koken
- Charlie Kolar
- Jon Kolb
- Kevin Kolb
- Elmer Kolberg
- Mike Kolen
- Robert Kolesar
- Larry Kolic
- Bill Kollar
- Louis Kolls
- Ed Kolman
- Ross Kolodziej
- Chris Kolodziejski
- Jeremiah Kolone
- Bill Koman
- Max Komar
- Jeff Komlo
- John Kompara
- Mark Koncar
- John Kondrla
- Mark Konecny
- Floyd Konetsky
- Jonathan Kongbo
- John Koniszewski
- Ed Konopasek
- Bob Konovsky
- Rob Konrad
- Jameson Konz
- Ken Konz
- Peter Konz
- Younghoe Koo
- Scott Kooistra
- George Koonce
- Malcolm Koonce
- Joe Koons
- Ed Koontz
- Joe Koontz
- David Kopay
- Joe Kopcha
- Lou Koplow
- Jeff Kopp
- Dan Koppen
- Walter Koppisch
- Mark Korff
- Ed Korisky
- R.J. Kors
- Ken Kortas
- Steve Korte
- Kelvin Korver
- Bernie Kosar
- Stan Kosel
- Terry Kosens
- Julie Koshlap
- Kyle Kosier
- Frank Kosikowski
- Gary Kosins
- J.J. Koski
- Stein Koss
- Ron Kostelnik
- Michael Kostiuk
- Stan Kostka
- Marty Kostos
- Tony Kostos
- Eddie Kotal
- Doug Kotar
- Rich Kotite
- Martin Kottler
- Arie Kouandjio
- Cyrus Kouandjio
- Niko Koutouvides
- Ed Kovac
- Jim Kovach
- Jordan Kovacs
- Bill Kovacsy
- Mike Kovaleski
- John Kovatch
- Johnny Kovatch
- Walt Kowalczyk
- Joe Kowalewski
- Bob Kowalkowski
- Scott Kowalkowski
- Al Kowalski
- Andy Kowalski
- Gary Kowalski
- Kevin Kowalski
- Nick Kowgios
- Ted Koy
- Ernie Koy, Jr.
- Ben Koyack
- Scott Kozak
- Chet Kozel
- Bruce Kozerski
- Mike Koziak
- Brian Kozlowski
- Glen Kozlowski
- Mike Kozlowski
- Stan Kozlowski
- Joe Kozlowsky
- Tanoh Kpassagnon

== Kr–Ky ==
- Dave Kraayeveld
- Mike Kracalik
- George Kracum
- Ollie Kraehe
- Eldred Kraemer
- Tommy Kraemer
- Reynold Kraft
- Rudy Kraft
- Tucker Kraft
- Greg Kragen
- Jim Krahl
- Merv Krakau
- Joe Kraker
- Joe Krakoski (born 1937)
- Joe Krakoski (born 1962)
- Jerry Krall
- Doug Kramer
- Erik Kramer
- Fritz Kramer
- George Kramer
- Jack Kramer
- Jerry Kramer
- Jordan Kramer
- Kent Kramer
- Kyle Kramer
- Ron Kramer
- Tommy Kramer
- Matt Kranchick
- Ken Kranz
- Bob Kratch
- Dan Kratzer
- Babe Kraus
- Bill Krause
- Henry Krause
- Jonathan Krause
- Larry Krause
- Max Krause
- Paul Krause
- Ryan Krause
- Barry Krauss
- Rich Kraynak
- John Kreamcheck
- Dan Kreider
- Steve Kreider
- Walt Kreinheder
- Casey Kreiter
- Rich Kreitling
- Joe Krejci
- Ken Kremer
- Karl Kremser
- Mitch Krenk
- Ty Krentler
- Craig Krenzel
- Keith Krepfle
- Mark Krerowicz
- Joe Kresky
- Eric Kresser
- Olin Kreutz
- Al Krevis
- Dave Krieg
- Jim Krieg
- Bob Krieger
- Earl Krieger
- Henry Krieger-Coble
- Emmett Kriel
- Doug Kriewald
- Clint Kriewaldt
- John Krimm
- Frank Kring
- Bill Krisher
- Howie Kriss
- Keaton Kristick
- Frank Kristufek
- Joe Krivonak
- Kai Kroeger
- Tyler Kroft
- Joe Krol
- Alex Kroll
- Bob Kroll
- Gary Kroner
- Troy Kropog
- Matt Kroul
- Ray Krouse
- Mike Kruczek
- Al Krueger (born 1902)
- Al Krueger (born 1919)
- Charlie Krueger
- Rolf Krueger
- Paul Kruger
- Lucas Krull
- Todd Krumm
- Tim Krumrie
- Joe Krupa
- Bob Kruse
- Larry Krutko
- Jerry Krysl
- John Ksionzyk
- Ray Kubala
- Jake Kubas
- Bob Kuberski
- Gary Kubiak
- Larry Kubin
- Ted Kucharski
- Frank Kuchta
- Paul Kuczo
- Bert Kuczynski
- Bob Kuechenberg
- Rudy Kuechenberg
- Luke Kuechly
- Ryan Kuehl
- Waddy Kuehl
- Art Kuehn
- Ray Kuffel
- Pete Kugler
- Joe Kuharich
- John Kuhn
- Markus Kuhn
- Oscar Kuhner
- George Kuhrt
- Stan Kuick
- Joe Kulbacki
- Vic Kulbitski
- Mike Kullman
- Eric Kumerow
- Jake Kumerow
- Jordan Kunaszyk
- Christian Kuntz
- Zack Kuntz
- George Kunz
- Lee Kunz
- Terry Kunz
- Irv Kupcinet
- Chris Kuper
- Cooper Kupp
- Craig Kupp
- Jake Kupp
- Ralph Kurek
- Jamie Kurisko
- Howard Kurnick
- Justin Kurpeikis
- Roy Kurrasch
- Joe Kurth
- Eric Kush
- Rod Kush
- John Kusko
- Lou Kusserow
- Rudy Kutler
- Malcolm Kutner
- Bill Kuusisto
- Fulton Kuykendall
- Bob Kuziel
- John Kuzman
- Zvonimir Kvaternik
- John Kvist
- Ted Kwalick
- William Kwenkeu
- Nick Kwiatkoski
- Aaron Kyle
- Jason Kyle
- Johnny Kyle
- Rip Kyle
- Troy Kyles
- Jeff Kysar
