= List of Marquette Golden Avalanche in the NFL draft =

This is a list of Marquette Golden Avalanche football players in the NFL draft.

== Key ==
B	Back	K	Kicker	NT	Nose tackle
C	Center	LB	Linebacker	FB	Fullback
DB	Defensive back	P	Punter	HB	Halfback
DE	Defensive end	QB	Quarterback	WR	Wide receiver
DT	Defensive tackle	RB	Running back	G	Guard
E	End	T	Offensive tackle	TE	Tight end

== Selections ==
Year	Round	Pick	Player	Team	Position
1936	7	63	Bob Peeples	New York Giants	T
1937	1	3	Ray Buivid	Chicago Cardinals	B
1937	3	23	Arthur Guepe	Chicago Cardinals	B
1937	4	34	Ward Cuff	New York Giants	B
1937	9	88	Al Guepe	Chicago Bears	B
1941	5	32	Ray Apolskis	Chicago Cardinals	C
1941	7	56	Don Vosberg	New York Giants	E
1942	8	64	Doug Renzel	Chicago Cardinals	B
1942	10	86	Johnny Goodyear	Washington Redskins	B
1942	12	104	Dick Brye	Chicago Cardinals	T
1942	12	109	Jimmy Richardson	Green Bay Packers	B
1943	6	44	Al Klug	Chicago Cardinals	T
1944	14	141	Mel Maceau	Cleveland Rams	C
1944	20	198	Ray Kuffel	Chicago Cardinals	E
1944	25	258	Len Liss	Green Bay Packers	T
1945	4	30	Steve Enich	Brooklyn Dodgers	G
1945	5	36	Johnny Strzykalski	Boston Yanks	B
1945	7	58	Marty Silovich	Boston Yanks	C
1945	8	68	John Harrington	Chicago Cardinals	E
1945	9	86	John Rudan	New York Giants	B
1945	20	200	John Kramer	Chicago Cardinals	T
1945	31	319	Wayne Johnston	Chicago Bears	B
1945	32	327	George Groves	Chicago Bears	C
1946	1	6	Johnny Strzykalski	Green Bay Packers	B
1946	13	118	Paul Copoulos	Detroit Lions	B
1946	20	190	Bob Albrecht	Los Angeles Rams	B
1946	22	210	Bob Richardson	Los Angeles Rams	T
1946	31	293	Orlando Palesse	Detroit Lions	E
1947	22	196	Carl Schuette	Detroit Lions	B
1951	14	170	Pat Flanagan	New York Giants	T
1951	16	192	Frank Volm	Chicago Bears	E
1951	22	258	Art Felker	Green Bay Packers	E
1952	12	136	Joe Masnaghetti	Chicago Cardinals	T
1954	27	315	Hosea Sims	Green Bay Packers	E
1954	30	358	Frank Metzke	Los Angeles Rams	T
1955	1	11	Ron Drzewiecki	Chicago Bears	RB
1955	10	110	Frank Scafidi	Chicago Cardinals	T
1955	14	159	Tom Braatz	Washington Redskins	E
1955	24	287	Joe Young	Chicago Bears	E
1955	27	322	Dick Shockey	San Francisco 49ers	B
1955	30	353	Jim Caruzzi	Pittsburgh Steelers	B
1956	19	221	Ray Zagar	Chicago Cardinals	B
1957	19	228	Lee Hermsen	Chicago Bears	B
1957	30	350	Larry Hubbard	Philadelphia Eagles	E
1958	10	116	Dick Campbell	Pittsburgh Steelers	C
1960	4	38	Silas Woods	St. Louis Cardinals	E
1960	12	144	Pete Hall	New York Giants	QB
1960	15	170	Frank Mestnik	St. Louis Cardinals	RB
1960	19	228	James Webster	New York Giants	B
1962	6	82	George Andrie	Dallas Cowboys	E
1962	17	237	Ken Schaffer	New York Giants	T
1969	15	389	George Thompson	Baltimore Colts	DB
