= Kafentzis =

Kafentzis (Greek: Καφεντζής) is a Greek surname. Notable people with the surname include:

- Austin Kafentzis (born 1996), American football player
- Kurt Kafentzis (born 1962), American football player, brother of Mark
- Mark Kafentzis (born 1958), American football player
