= Ted Karras =

Ted Karras can refer to:

- Ted Karras Sr. (1934–2016), American football player from 1958-1966
- Ted Karras Jr. (born 1964), American football coach and former player; son of Ted Karras Sr.
- Ted Karras (offensive lineman) (born 1993), American football player; son of Ted Karras Jr.
