= List of defunct NFL franchises' first-round draft picks =

The National Football League has held a player draft since 1936. Since 1936 there have been several franchises that have folded. This is a list of those franchises' first-round draft picks.

== Baltimore Colts (1950) ==
Year	Overall	Player	Position	College
1950	2	Adrian Burk	QB	Baylor

== Boston Yanks / New York Bulldogs/Yanks / Dallas Texans ==
Year	Overall	Player	Position	College	Incarnation
1944	1	Angelo Bertelli	Back	Notre Dame	Boston Yanks
1945	4	Eddie Prokop	Back	Georgia Tech	Boston Yanks
1946	1	Frank Dancewicz	Back	Notre Dame	Boston Yanks
1947	3	Fritz Barzilauskas	G	Yale	Boston Yanks
1948	5	Vaughn Mancha	C	Alabama	Boston Yanks
1949	3	Doak Walker	Back	SMU	New York Bulldogs
1950	NA	None	NA	NA	New York Yanks
1951	NA	None	NA	NA	New York Yanks
1952	2	Les Richter	G	California	Dallas Texans

- 1950 and 1951 picks were traded to the Chicago Bears in exchange for Bobby Layne.
- 1952 pick was made by New York Yanks. Yanks picks given to Dallas.

== Brooklyn Dodgers/Tigers ==
Year	Overall	Player	Position	College	Incarnation
1936	4	Dick Crayne	Back	Iowa	Brooklyn Dodgers
1937	2	Ed Goddard	Back	Washington State	Brooklyn Dodgers
1938	3	Boyd Brumbaugh	Back	Duquesne	Brooklyn Dodgers
1939	5	Bob MacLeod	Back	Dartmouth	Brooklyn Dodgers
1940	4	Banks McFadden	Back	Clemson	Brooklyn Dodgers
1941	8	Dean McAdams	Back	Washington	Brooklyn Dodgers
1942	7	Bobby Robertson	Back	Southern California	Brooklyn Dodgers
1943	4	Paul Governali	Back	Columbia	Brooklyn Dodgers
1944	3	Creighton Miller	Back	Notre Dame	Brooklyn Tigers
1945	3	Joe Renfroe	Back	Tulane	Brooklyn Tigers
