= List of Denver Pioneers in the NFL draft =

This is a list of Denver Pioneers football players in the NFL draft.

== Key ==
B	Back	K	Kicker	NT	Nose tackle
C	Center	LB	Linebacker	FB	Fullback
DB	Defensive back	P	Punter	HB	Halfback
DE	Defensive end	QB	Quarterback	WR	Wide receiver
DT	Defensive tackle	RB	Running back	G	Guard
E	End	T	Offensive tackle	TE	Tight end

== Selections ==
Year	Round	Pick	Player	Team	Position
1937	5	41	Alex Drobnitch	Philadelphia Eagles	B
1937	9	90	Ray Johnson	Cleveland Rams	T
1938	12	110	Fred Dreher	Chicago Bears	E
1940	6	47	John Woudenberg	Chicago Bears	T
1940	19	176	Herb McCarthy	Detroit Lions	B
1941	15	138	Mike Jurich	Brooklyn Dodgers	T
1942	9	77	Bob Gifford	Brooklyn Dodgers	B
1943	15	138	Don Carlson	Green Bay Packers	T
1945	6	46	Gregg Browning	Pittsburgh Steelers	E
1945	16	161	Wayne Flanigan	Detroit Lions	E
1945	29	298	Nick Studen	Brooklyn Tigers	B
1945	30	315	Leon Diner	Washington Redskins	E
1946	14	125	Bob Hazelhurst	New York Giants	B
1946	20	184	Johnny Adams	Chicago Bears	B
1946	25	232	Chet Latcham	Boston Yanks	G
1946	25	235	George Miller	New York Giants	T
1947	10	77	Bob Hazelhurst	Boston Yanks	B
1947	32	296	John Karamigios	Chicago Cardinals	B
1949	9	84	Bernie Craig	New York Bulldogs	T
1950	12	147	Andy Pavich	Green Bay Packers	E
1950	18	226	Don Stansauk	Detroit Lions	T
1951	25	292	Mike Peterson	San Francisco 49ers	E
1952	6	69	Gordon Cooper	Detroit Lions	E
1954	15	172	Jim Swan	New York Giants	G
1955	20	240	Fred K. Mahaffey	Detroit Lions	B
1956	3	34	Larry Ross	Cleveland Rams	E
1957	8	92	Ernie Pitts	San Francisco 49ers	E
1958	20	235	George Colbert	Los Angeles Rams	B
1959	23	269	Sal Cesario	Detroit Lions	T
1959	30	354	Bob Carter	San Francisco 49ers	T
