= Tom Kerrigan =

Tom Kerrigan may refer to:

- Tom Kerrigan (Coronation Street), a character on the TV soap opera Coronation Street
- Tom Kerrigan (golfer) (1895–1964), American golfer
- Tom Kerrigan (American football) (1906–1979), American football player
