= Klingel =

Klingel is a surname. Notable people with the surname include:

- Gilbert Klingel (1908–1983), naturalist, boatbuilder, adventurer, photographer, author, inventor, and contributor to the Baltimore Sun
- Johannes Klingel, known for the Klingel's formula
- John Klingel (born 1963), American football player
