= Kelsh =

Kelsh is a surname. Notable people with the surname include:

- Jerry Kelsh (born 1940), American politician
- Matt Kelsh (1904–1991), American football player
- Scot Kelsh (born 1962), American politician
