= Mel Maceau =

American football player (1921–1981)

- Maceau in 1946

No. 24
- Position: Center

Personal information
- Born: December 25, 1921; Milwaukee, Wisconsin, U.S.
- Died: February 16, 1981 (aged 59); Bowling Green, Ohio, U.S.
- Listed height: 6 ft 0 in (1.83 m)
- Listed weight: 203 lb (92 kg)

Career information
- High school: Rufus King (Milwaukee)
- College: Marquette (1940-1942, 1945)
- NFL draft: 1944: 14th round, 141st overall pick

Career history
- Cleveland Browns (1946–1948)

Awards and highlights
- 3× AAFC champion (1946, 1947, 1948)

Career AAFC statistics
- Games played: 37
- Stats at Pro Football Reference

Melvin Anthony Maceau (December 25, 1921 – February 16, 1981) was an American football center in the All-America Football Conference (AAFC) for the Cleveland Browns from 1946 to 1948.

Maceau grew up in Wisconsin and played football at the collegiate level at Marquette University. He served for two years in World War II between 1943 and 1944 before returning to Marquette at the end of the 1945 season. Maceau then signed with the Browns, where he played as a backup center for three years. Paul Brown, Cleveland's head coach, waived him before the 1949 season, and he retired from professional football. The Browns won the AAFC championship in each of the years Maceau played for the team.

== Early life ==
Maceau grew up in Milwaukee, Wisconsin and attended Rufus King High School.

== College and professional career ==
After high school, Maceau went to Marquette University in Milwaukee and played on the school's football team in 1941 and 1942 as a center. The following year, he joined the Army Air Corps during World War II and trained as a cryptographer. He served for two years in the China Burma India Theater, returning to Maruqette in 1945 to complete his studies. Maceau also played on Marquette's football team for part of the 1945 season. He was selected in the 14th round by the Cleveland Rams in the 1944 NFL draft, but did not sign with the team because of his military service.

In early 1946, Maceau played for the Omar Bakers in the Classic Basketball League. Later that year, he joined the Cleveland Browns, a team under formation in the new All-America Football Conference (AAFC), along with three former Marquette teammates, John Harrington, George Groves and Wilfred Kramer. Maceau and Harrington made the team.

Maceau played with the Browns for three seasons between 1946 and 1948; the team won the league championship in each of those years. Maceau was a third-stringer behind Mike Scarry and Frank Gatski at center, but he got playing time in late 1947 when Scarry was injured, substituting as a defensive lineman. Before the beginning of the 1949 season, Cleveland coach Paul Brown released Maceau on waivers, allowing other teams to pick him up. Maceau then retired from professional football.
