= Jackie Lowther =

American football player (1922–1952)

No. 42, 33
- Position: Halfback

Personal information
- Born: December 27, 1922; Detroit, Michigan, U.S.
- Died: September 29, 1952 (aged 29); Livonia, Michigan, U.S.
- Listed height: 5 ft 8 in (1.73 m)
- Listed weight: 164 lb (74 kg)

Career information
- High school: East Detroit
- College: Detroit Mercy (1942)
- NFL draft: 1945: 8th round, 72nd overall pick

Career history
- Detroit Lions (1944); Pittsburgh Steelers (1945)

Career NFL statistics
- Rushing yards: 72
- Rushing average: 3
- Passing yards: 54
- TD–INT: 0–3
- Passer rating: 20.2
- Stats at Pro Football Reference

Russell Jack Lowther Jr. (December 27, 1922 – September 29, 1952), sometimes known as "Little Jackie" Lowther, was an American professional football player. He played college football for Michigan State in 1941 and Detroit in 1942 and professional football for the Detroit Lions in 1944 and the Pittsburgh Steelers in 1945.

== Early life ==
Lowther was born in 1922 in Detroit. He attended Eastern High School in Detroit. At Easterh, he won all-city honors in football, played hlafback, and was rated as one of the best punters in Michigan.

== Football career ==
Lowther played college football for the Michigan State Spartans in 1941 and the Detroit Titans in 1942.

Lowther played professional football in the National Football League (NFL) as a halfback for the Detroit Lions in 1944 and for the Pittsburgh Steelers in 1945. He appeared in 10 NFL games, two as a starter, and totaled 72 rushing yards on 24 carries and 54 passing yards on 7 of 14 passes. A triple-threat man, he was described by the Detroit Evening Times as "a fine passer, a good kicker, and an elusive runner." He also played for the Paterson Panthers of the American Football League in 1947.

== Later life ==
After his playing career ended, he was the co-owner and sales manager of the Detroit Paint and Glass Co. He died in 1952 at age 29 in a small plane crash on takeoff from the Triangle Airport in Livonia, Michigan.
