= Clyde LeForce =

American football player (1923–2006)

- LeForce on a 1948 Leaf Gum Co. trading card

No. 11, 22
- Position: Quarterback

Personal information
- Born: June 4, 1923; Pawnee, Oklahoma, U.S.
- Died: June 9, 2006 (aged 83); Bristow, Oklahoma, U.S.
- Listed height: 5 ft 11 in (1.80 m)
- Listed weight: 176 lb (80 kg)

Career information
- High school: Bristow
- College: Tulsa (1942-1943, 1946)
- NFL draft: 1945: 19th round, 194th overall pick

Career history
- Detroit Lions (1947–1949)

Awards and highlights
- 1946 All-Missouri Valley Conference

Career NFL statistics
- TD–INT: 25–37
- Passing yards: 2,961
- Passer rating: 58.1
- Stats at Pro Football Reference

Clyde J. LeForce, Jr. (June 4, 1923 – June 9, 2006) was an American professional football player who was a quarterback in the National Football League (NFL). He played college football for the Tulsa Golden Hurricane.

== College career ==
LeForce attended the University of Tulsa, where he played football as a quarterback in 1942, 1943 and, after a hiatus to serve in the United States Navy during World War II, 1946. In 1943, he led the team in scoring (59 points), rushing (290 yards), passing (557 yards), punting (908 yards), and punt returns (154 yards). In 1946, he was named an All-Missouri Valley Conference player. LeForce was inducted into the Tulsa Hurricane Hall of Fame in 1986.

== Professional football career ==
LeForce was selected by the Detroit Lions in the 19th round of the 1945 NFL draft (194th overall). However, he returned to Tulsa for his final year of college eligibility before he entered the NFL. In 1947, he went to play for the Lions where he remained for all three years of his professional playing career.

In 1947, he played nine games including two starts. He completed 94 passes on 175 attempts for 1,384 yards and 13 touchdowns and 20 interceptions. LeForce also compiled 143 rushing yards and three defensive interceptions.

In 1948, LeForce played in twelve games including two starts, where he recorded 50 completions on 101 attempts for 912 yards, nine touchdowns, and eight interceptions. He rushed for 86 yards and one rushing touchdown and compiled 122 receiving yards and three receiving touchdowns. He also recorded one defensive interception.

In 1949, he played in eleven games including one start. He completed 53 of 112 attempts for 665 yards, three touchdowns, and nine interceptions. He rushed for 58 yards and one touchdown.

LeForce died on June 9, 2006.
