= Paul McKee (American football) =

American football player (1923–1999)

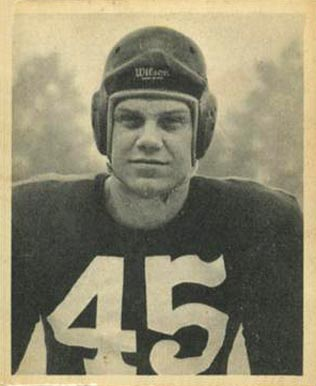
- McKee on a 1948 Bowman football card

No. 45
- Position: End

Personal information
- Born: April 26, 1923; Beaver Falls, Pennsylvania, U.S.
- Died: January 23, 1999 (aged 75)
- Listed height: 6 ft 3 in (1.91 m)
- Listed weight: 217 lb (98 kg)

Career information
- High school: Beaver Falls
- College: Rochester; Syracuse (1942, 1946)
- NFL draft: 1945: 12th round, 117th overall pick

Career history
- Washington Redskins (1947–1948)

Career NFL statistics
- Receptions: 30
- Receiving yards: 413
- Total touchdowns: 2
- Stats at Pro Football Reference

Paul Melvin McKee (April 26, 1923 – January 23, 1999) was an American professional football end in the National Football League (NFL) for the Washington Redskins. He played college football at Syracuse University and was selected in the twelfth round of the 1945 NFL draft. He played for the Redskins for two years.

Like Joe Namath after him, McKee starred in football, basketball, and baseball at Beaver Falls High School in Beaver Falls, PA (1938–1940). In addition to playing football at Syracuse, McKee was a wartime reserve on the Orange basketball team, scoring three points in the one game in which he played (1942–1943).

McKee's best game with the Redskins happened to be Sammy Baugh Day, November 23, 1947, when future NFL Hall of Famer Baugh was honored and presented with a new station wagon. Playing against the champion Chicago Cardinals that day, Baugh threw for 355 yards and had six touchdown passes, with McKee catching two of them and the 'Skins defeating the Cardinals 45–21.

On November 28, 1948, McKee was ejected from a game for decking with a hard right another future Hall of Famer, the Chicago Bears' Clyde "Bulldog" Turner. This was after Turner had stunned him with a forearm and elbow to the face (in the era before facemasks) while McKee was running a decoy route left and Baugh throwing incomplete right. The Washington Times-Herald's sports editor, Ev Gardner, wrote a column about the incident the following week, pleading, according to the column's title, "No Fine for Paul, Please; Rather Curb the Bulldog." Just two summary paragraphs from Gardner's column: First, "The hulking Turner was standing with some of the other Bears waiting for the Skins to line up again, when McKee got his bearings. Paul walked over and planted a beautiful right square on Turner’s jaw. It carried plenty of voltage for the massive Bulldog was laid flat on his back. His features resembled strawberry jam." Second, "When a player is tossed out of an N[F]L game for fighting he automatically is fined $50. No notice of any fine has been forthcoming as yet from Commissioner Bert Bell’s office."

After retiring from the NFL, McKee embarked on a career of college and high school coaching, teaching, and athletics administration. He started as an assistant coach at the University of Rochester, doing baseball, basketball, and football. He went on to coach high school football at Rome Free Academy, Vernon-Verona-Sherrill, and Rush-Henrietta, all in upstate New York. Between his years at V-V-S and R-H, he was an assistant football coach under John Yovicsin at Harvard (1960–1963 football seasons).

McKee's first season as head coach at Rome, 1955, was RFA's most successful in thirteen years. RFA's seven wins included an 18–6 victory over Rochester's Aquinas Institute; their lone loss was by just two points, 20–18, to Auburn. Highlights of McKee's second season at the helm, when RFA won five, lost two, and tied one, included holding on to tie Aquinas, 13–13, snapping Auburn's nineteen-game winning streak 19–8, and outlasting Syracuse's Christian Brothers Academy 13–7.

McKee started the R-H football program with an undefeated freshman team (1964) that continued undefeated the following season as JVs. From the fall when that team became seniors until McKee retired from coaching, his five full varsity teams (1968–1972) had a record of 37–3 and either won or tied for five conference championships.

One of McKee's sons, Thom, became known nationwide in 1980 for winning $312,700 on the television game show Tic Tac Dough. Another son, Jeff, in 1981, was a first-team All-American defenseman in lacrosse at Syracuse.

McKee was inducted into the Beaver County Sports Hall of Fame in 1981, into the University of Rochester's Athletic Hall of Fame in 1998 (for football and basketball), and into New York State Section V's Football Hall of Fame posthumously in 2003 (for coaching).
