= Bob Ivory =

American football player (1924–1989)

- Ivory, c. 1946

No. 42
- Position: Guard

Personal information
- Born: January 29, 1924; Detroit, Michigan, U.S.
- Died: February 25, 1989 (aged 65); Detroit, Michigan, U.S.
- Listed height: 6 ft 2 in (1.88 m)
- Listed weight: 212 lb (96 kg)

Career information
- High school: Detroit Catholic Central
- College: Detroit (1942)
- NFL draft: 1945: 26th round, 270th overall pick

Career history
- Detroit Lions (1947)

Career NFL statistics
- Games played: 3
- Stats at Pro Football Reference

Robert James Ivory (January 29, 1924 – February 25, 1989) was an American professional football guard.

A native of Detroit, Ivory attended Detroit Catholic Central High School where he was a star lineman on the football team. He played college football for the Detroit Titans in 1942.

In 1943, he entered the United States Army Air Forces. While in the service, he played for the undefeated 1943 Greensboro Tech-Hawks football team and the 1944 and 1945 Third Air Force football teams. He was also chosen to participate in the 1945 Chicago College All-Star Game. He returned to the University of Detroit after the war and was co-captain of the 1946 football team. He was also named to the Catholic All-America first-team.

He was selected by the Detroit Lions in the 26th round (270th overall pick) of the 1945 NFL draft and signed with the Lions in March 1947. He appeared in three games for the Lions during the 1947 season. Injuries hampered his professional career.

In July 1948, he was hired as the line coach at the University of Detroit.

After retiring from football, Ivory joined the Ivory Moving & Storage Co., a company founded by his father in 1916. In 1977, he joined Corrigan Moving Systems. He and his wife, Mary Jane, had five children: Midge, Robert, Benjamin, Timothy, Patrick, and Brian. He died in 1989 following surgery at Harper Hospital in Detroit.
