= Johnny Cook (Canadian football) =

American gridiron football player (1925–1986)

No. 5
- Position: Quarterback

Personal information
- Born: December 19, 1925; Lenox, Georgia, U.S.
- Died: September 17, 1986 (aged 60); Rome, Georgia, U.S.
- Listed height: 5 ft 8 in (1.73 m)
- Listed weight: 152 lb (69 kg)

Career information
- College: Georgia

Career history
- 1948: Regina Roughriders

Awards and highlights
- First-team All-SEC (1943)

John Homer Cook Jr. (December 19, 1925 – September 17, 1986) was an American professional football quarterback who played one season with the Regina Roughriders of the Western Interprovincial Football Union (WIFU). He played college football at the University of Georgia.

== Early life and college ==
John Homer Cook Jr. was born on December 19, 1925, in Lenox, Georgia.

Cook lettered for the Georgia Bulldogs of the University of Georgia in 1943, earning Associated Press first-team All-SEC honors at halfback. After the 1943 season, head coach Wally Butts moved Cook to quarterback. However, Cook then served in the United States Army Air Forces during World War II from June 1944 until spring 1946. He returned to the Bulldogs in 1946 and earned a letter for that season. Due to an injury to John Rauch, Cook was Georgia's starting quarterback for the 70–7 victory over Furman on October 26, 1946. Overall in 1946, Cook completed 18 of 27 passes (66.7%) for 223 yards and two touchdowns while also rushing 13 times for 55 yards and one touchdown.

== Professional career ==
Cook was selected by the Chicago Cardinals in the 23rd round, with the 233rd overall pick, of the 1945 NFL draft. However, his selection by the Cardinals was later declared ineligible. He was also selected by the Chicago Bears in the 29th round, with the 274th overall pick, of the 1946 NFL draft.

Cook played in 11 games, all starts, for the Regina Roughriders of the Western Interprovincial Football Union in 1948 and scored three passing touchdowns. The Roughriders finished the season with a 3–9 record.

== Personal life ==
Cook was an SEC football official for 30 years until retiring in 1984. He was also the vice president of the Citizens Federal Savings and Loan Association in Atlanta.

He died of leukemia on September 17, 1986, in Rome, Georgia at the age of 60.
