= Walter Watt =

American football player (1922–1994)

No. 50
- Position: Halfback

Personal information
- Born: June 16, 1922; Dennison, Ohio, U.S.
- Died: December 29, 1994 (aged 72); West Palm Beach, Florida, U.S.
- Listed height: 6 ft 0 in (1.83 m)
- Listed weight: 187 lb (85 kg)

Career information
- High school: Lash (Zanesville, Ohio)
- College: Miami (1940–1944)
- NFL draft: 1945: 3rd round, 18th overall pick

Career history
- Chicago Cardinals (1945)
- Stats at Pro Football Reference

Walter Wilson Watt (June 16, 1922 – December 29, 1994) was an American professional football halfback who played for the Chicago Cardinals of the National Football League (NFL). He played college football for the Miami Hurricanes, and was selected by the Cardinals in the third round of the 1945 NFL draft.

== Early life ==
Walter Wilson Watt was born on June 16, 1922, in Dennison, Ohio. He attended Lash High School in Zanesville, Ohio.

== College career ==
Watt enrolled at the University of Miami to play college football for the Hurricanes. He was on the freshman team in 1940, and was a four-year varsity letterman from 1941 to 1944. In 1941, he was reported as being the fastest player on the team. Watt graduated from Miami in 1945. As of 1986, he still held the team record for longest punt return with an 87-yarder.

== Professional career ==
Watt was selected by the Chicago Cardinals in the third round, with the 18th overall pick, of the 1945 NFL draft. He played in four games for the Cardinals during the 1945 season, rushing six times for nine yards, catching one pass for 22 yards, and returning one kick for 18 yards. He also played defense.

== Personal life ==
After his football career, he worked for Florida Power & Light for 42 years until retiring in 1987. He was a noted "Gator Hater". He died on December 29, 1994, in hospice care in West Palm Beach, Florida.
