= Joe Renfroe =

American athlete

Profile
- Positions: Halfback, quarterback

Personal information
- Born: August 14, 1921
- Died: December 9, 1987 (aged 66); Hinds County, Mississippi, U.S.
- Listed height: 6 ft 1 in (1.85 m)
- Listed weight: 203 lb (92 kg)

Career information
- High school: Fort Myers (FL)
- College: Tulane (1942–1944)

Joseph Renfroe (August 14, 1921 – December 9, 1987) was an American football player and coach. He played college football at the halfback and quarterback positions for Tulane from 1942 to 1944. He was selected with the No. 3 pick in the 1945 NFL draft but opted instead for a coaching career. From 1947 to 1987, he held coaching and administrative positions at Hinds Junior College.

== Early life ==
Renfroe was born in 1921. He was raised in Wauchula, Florida, and later in Fort Myers, Florida. He attended Fort Myers High School where he was a star football player.

== Athletic career ==
Renfroe played college football as a halfback and quarterback for Tulane Green Wave football teams from 1942 to 1944. He was selected by the Associated Press as the first-team quarterback on the 1943 All-SEC football team. He also competed in the discus for the Tulane track team, winning an SEC championship in the event in 1944.

Renfroe was mustered into the Army Air Corps during World War II, but he was classified 4-F due to a double hernia.

Renfroe was selected by the Brooklyn Tigers in the first round with the third overall pick in the 1945 NFL draft. Rather than play in the NFL, he announced that he would accept an assistant coaching job at Gulf Coast Military Academy. In July 1945, he was selected to play for the college all-stars in the Chicago College All-Star Game on August 30, 1945. He sustained a career-ending shoulder injury playing in that game against the Green Bay Packers.

== Coaching career ==
Renfroe was hired in 1947 as an assistant football coach at Hinds Junior College in Utica, Mississippi. He became head coach in from 1953 and held that position until 1969, compiling a record of 132-76-5. He was also the athletic director at Hinds from 1969 to 1987. He led Hinds to a victory in the 1954 Junior Rose Bowl.

== Later life ==
Renfroe was inducted into the Mississippi Sports Hall of Fame. He died in 1987.
