= Alex Wizbicki =

American football player (1921–2018)

No. 82, 85, 25
- Positions: Defensive back, halfback

Personal information
- Born: October 6, 1921; Brooklyn, New York, U.S.
- Died: December 3, 2018 (aged 97); Superior, Wisconsin, U.S.
- Listed height: 5 ft 11 in (1.80 m)
- Listed weight: 188 lb (85 kg)

Career information
- High school: Boys (Brooklyn)
- College: Holy Cross (1941-1942, 1946); Dartmouth (1943)
- NFL draft: 1945: 18th round, 178th overall pick

Career history
- Buffalo Bills (1947–1948); Baltimore Colts (1948)*; Buffalo Bills (1949); Cleveland Browns (1950)*; Green Bay Packers (1950)
- * Offseason or practice squad member only

Career NFL/AAFC statistics
- Rushing yards: 34
- Rushing average: 2.4
- Interceptions: 6
- Fumble recoveries: 2
- Stats at Pro Football Reference

Alexander John Wizbicki (October 6, 1921 – December 3, 2018) was an American professional football defensive back and halfback in the All-America Football Conference (AAFC) and the National Football League (NFL). Born in Brooklyn, New York, he played for the AAFC's Buffalo Bills (1946–1949) and the NFL's Green Bay Packers (1950). Wizbicki played collegiately for Holy Cross College and Dartmouth College before being drafted by the Pittsburgh Steelers in the 18th round of the 1945 NFL draft. He played for 4 seasons professionally in the NFL and retired in 1950.

He was also a World War II veteran, having served in the US Marine Corps. During his freshman year in college the Second World War broke out and Wizbicki joined the Marine Corps. He had basic training in South Carolina then went on to have more training at Camp Lejeune, North Carolina. After this he was sent to Guam to train for further operations. He was assigned to a reconnaissance company with the mission of gathering information behind enemy lines on Japanese troop placement. He and his reconnaissance company were awarded the Bronze Star several years later for gallantry in action during a patrol mission. Wizbicki saw most of his combat during the invasion of Okinawa. This was the last combat he saw, as the plans to invade Japan were scrapped after nuclear bombs were dropped on Hiroshima and Nagasaki and Japan surrendered. After the war, Wizbicki received the Asiatic–Pacific Campaign Medal and Bronze Star Medal; however, he lost them while moving. In 2013, he was given replacement medals. He died in Superior, Wisconsin on 3 December 2018 at the age of 97.

When asked how his service affected his life he said, "I appreciate things more than I ever did. Up to the point prior to going into induction, I had everything but I took it for granted, I didn't realize how lucky a person can be. It gave me more incentive to follow up some thoughts of doing better, and I did that and I enjoyed a good life, I wouldn't change it."
