= Mario Giannelli =

American football player (1920–2003)

No. 64
- Position: Guard

Personal information
- Born: December 24, 1920; Everett, Massachusetts, U.S.
- Died: July 2, 2003 (aged 82); Chelsea, Massachusetts, U.S.
- Listed height: 6 ft 0 in (1.83 m)
- Listed weight: 265 lb (120 kg)

Career information
- High school: Everett
- College: Boston College
- NFL draft: 1945: 20th round, 201st overall pick

Career history
- Philadelphia Eagles (1948–1951)

Awards and highlights
- 2× NFL champion (1948, 1949); College All-Star Game (1948); Boston College Varsity Club Athletic Hall of Fame (1991)

Career NFL statistics
- Games played: 44
- Games started: 12
- Fumble recoveries: 2
- Stats at Pro Football Reference

Mario M. Giannelli (December 24, 1920 – July 2, 2003), nicknamed "Yo-Yo", was an American professional football player who was a guard in the National Football League (NFL). He played for the Philadelphia Eagles for four seasons from 1948–1951. He was selected by the Boston Yanks in the twentieth round of the 1945 NFL draft, but did not play for them. He played college football for the Boston College Eagles.

== College career ==
Giannelli played college football for the Boston College Eagles in 1942, 1946 and 1947. In 1942, he played on the team that made it to the 1943 Orange Bowl. Giannelli's college career was broken up by World War II, and he fought in the Battle of Okinawa in 1945. While in the Army, he was a champion boxer. He returned to football in 1946, and in 1948 he was selected to the College All-Star Game.

Gianelli was inducted into the Boston College Varsity Club Athletic Hall of Fame in 1991.

== Professional career ==
Giannelli was drafted by the Boston Yanks in the twentieth round (201st overall) of the 1945 NFL draft, but did not play for them. He signed with the Philadelphia Eagles in 1948, and played in the 1948 and 1949 NFL Championship Games. He was re-signed on June 30, 1951, but was traded to the Green Bay Packers on April 25, 1952, in exchange for guard Buddy Burris. He retired from football on July 29, 1952, and returned to his hometown of Everett, Massachusetts.

== Death ==
Giannelli died on July 2, 2003, in Chelsea, Massachusetts, at the age of 82.
