= John Steber =

American football player (1923–1975)

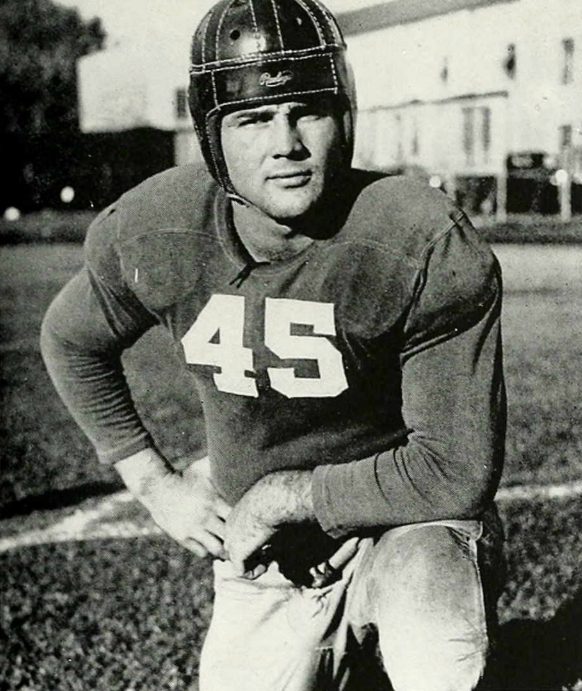
- Steber from the 1944 Blue Print

No. 16
- Position: Guard

Personal information
- Born: September 12, 1923; Mobile, Alabama, U.S.
- Died: October 1, 1975 (aged 52); Mobile, Alabama, U.S.
- Listed height: 6 ft 0 in (1.83 m)
- Listed weight: 225 lb (102 kg)

Career information
- High school: Murphy (Mobile)
- College: Vanderbilt (1942); Georgia Tech (1943)
- NFL draft: 1945: 7th round, 61st overall pick

Career history

Playing
- Washington Redskins (1946–1950)

Coaching
- New York Titans (1960-1961) Offensive line/assistant coach; Houston Oilers (1964) Offensive line coach

Awards and highlights
- First-team All-American (1943); Jacobs Blocking Trophy (1943); First-team All-SEC (1943)

Career NFL statistics
- Games played: 55
- Games started: 38
- Fumble recoveries: 5
- Stats at Pro Football Reference

John Warren Steber III (September 12, 1923 – October 1, 1975) was an American professional football guard in the National Football League (NFL) for the Washington Redskins. He played college football for the Vanderbilt Commodores and the Georgia Tech Yellow Jackets. He was selected in the seventh round of the 1945 NFL draft.

== Biography ==
Steber was born in Mobile, Alabama. In 1942, he played as a sophomore guard for the Vanderbilt Commodores. The following year, he was part of the V-12 Navy College Training Program at Georgia Tech and played with their Yellow Jackets team. He left the United States Navy in 1946.

In 1955, he began working as a line coach at Hardin-Simmons University.
