= Frank Mattioli =

American football player (1923–1998)

No. 92
- Position: Guard

Personal information
- Born: February 14, 1923; Brackenridge, Pennsylvania, U.S.
- Died: November 27, 1998 (aged 75); Natrona Heights, Pennsylvania, U.S.
- Listed height: 6 ft 0 in (1.83 m)
- Listed weight: 210 lb (95 kg)

Career information
- College: Pittsburgh (1941–1945)
- NFL draft: 1945: 14th round, 139th overall pick

Career history
- Pittsburgh Steelers (1946)

Career NFL statistics
- Games played: 11
- Games started: 2
- Fumble recoveries: 1
- Stats at Pro Football Reference

Francis A. Mattioli (February 14, 1923 – November 27, 1998) was an American professional football player who was a guard for the Pittsburgh Steelers of the National Football League (NFL). He played college football for the Pittsburgh Panthers.

== College career ==
Mattioli played college football for the Pittsburgh Panthers from 1941 to 1945.

== Professional career ==
=== Chicago Bears ===
Mattioli was selected by the Chicago Bears in the 14th round with the 139th pick of the 1945 NFL draft.

=== Pittsburgh Steelers ===
Mattioli signed with the Pittsburgh Steelers on May 12, 1946. He played in all 11 games of the 1946 season at guard, starting in two of them. Mattioli had one fumble recovery in his career, returning it for 15 yards. On August 1, 1947, he was released by the Steelers.
