= Tex Kelly =

American football player (1898–1978)

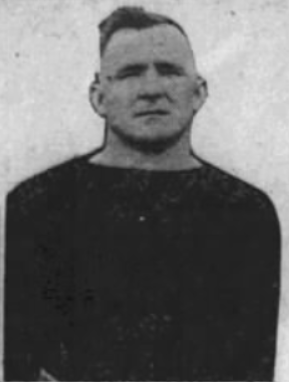
- Kelly, c. 1923

No. 16, 12
- Position: Lineman

Personal information
- Born: October 29, 1898; Duncan, Oklahoma, U.S.
- Died: February 4, 1978 (aged 79); Shawnee, Oklahoma, U.S.
- Listed height: 6 ft 3 in (1.91 m)
- Listed weight: 220 lb (100 kg)

Career information
- College: None

Career history
- Toledo Maroons (1922); Buffalo All-Americans (1923); Rochester Jeffersons (1925); Buffalo Rangers (1926); Orange Tornadoes (1929)

Career statistics
- Games played: 17
- Games started: 10
- Stats at Pro Football Reference

Clarence Ashley "Tex" Kelly (October 29, 1898 – February 4, 1978), also known as Clancy Kelly, was an American football lineman who played five seasons in the National Football League (NFL) for the Toledo Maroons, Buffalo All-Americans, Rochester Jeffersons, Buffalo Rangers and Orange Tornadoes from 1922 to 1929.

== Early life and education ==
Kelly was born on October 28, 1898, in Duncan, Oklahoma. His high school is unknown and he did not attend college, according to Pro-Football-Reference.com. (Note: A 1923 article from The Buffalo Times mentioned him as one of three "collegiate celebrities" who had been signed by the Buffalo All-Americans, but it did not mention what college he attended. Pro-Football-Reference.com lists "none" as college attended.)

== Professional career ==
In 1922, Kelly was signed by the Toledo Maroons of the National Football League (NFL), despite not playing college football. The Maroons had just entered the league and began the season on October 1, against the Evansville Crimson Giants. They won the match, 15–0, in their first game of NFL play. The following game was against the Milwaukee Badgers, who included Fritz Pollard on their roster. After going down 0–12 by Pollard touchdowns, the Maroons "showed unexpected strength" and were able to force a tie, 12–12. The Maroons then went on to win three straight games, against the Hammond Pros 14–0, Racine Legion 7–0, and the Louisville Brecks 39–0. The Brecks game was among two matches during the season in which Kelly did not appear. (Note: Kelly played in seven of the Maroons' nine games, per Pro-Football-Reference.com. He was not mentioned in The Gazette Times (of Pittsburgh) box score for the Brecks game.) Afterwards, the Maroons traveled to Canton, Ohio, where they played to a 0–0 tie against the eventual champion Canton Bulldogs on November 5. Kelly was mentioned as a substitute for Cy Myers at the right end position in game recaps. The Maroons did not play another NFL game until November 26, when they won 7–6 over the Columbus Panhandles with Kelly at starting right tackle. Clarence "Steamer" Horning came in as a substitute for Kelly in the match. Toledo closed out the NFL season with a 0–19 loss to the Chicago Bears on December 10, and a 0–19 loss to Canton the next week, finishing with a 5–2–2 record in NFL play, 4th in the league. Kelly, wearing number 16, appeared in seven games and started four, playing both right end and left end, right guard and left guard, and right tackle and left tackle.

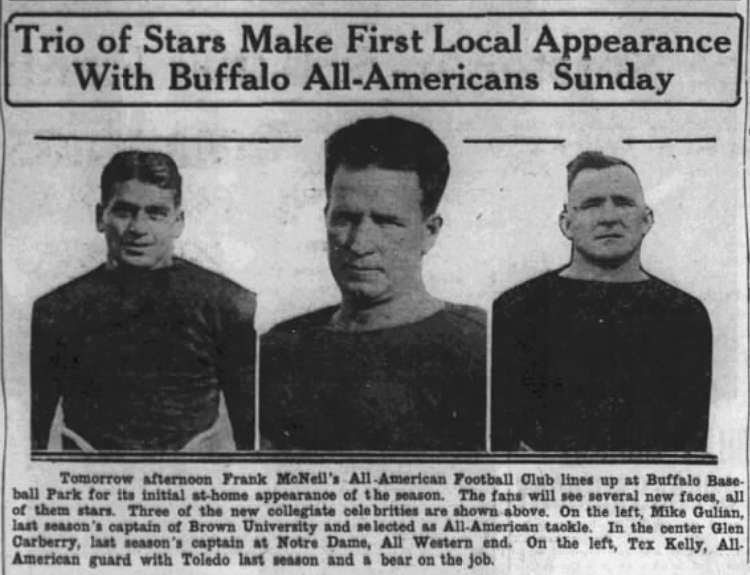
News article about the signing of Kelly (pictured on the right)

In October 1923, Kelly was signed by the Buffalo All-Americans. The Buffalo Times reported that "the fans will see several new faces, all of them stars," including "Tex Kelly, All-American guard with Toledo last season and a bear on the job." He appeared in two games, both as a starter, against the Akron Pros (a 9–0 win), and the Columbus Tigers (a 3–0 win), before being released in favor of Frank Morrissey, because he "didn't seem to know what the word charge, on a football field, meant," according to The Buffalo Times. He wore number 12 with Buffalo. Kelly did not play for any National Football League team during the 1924 season.

In 1925, Kelly returned to the NFL, being signed by the Rochester Jeffersons. They started the season with a 7–14 loss to the Canton Bulldogs on September 27. One week later, they tied 0–0 the Buffalo Bisons; this was the only game of the season where Kelly did not play. (Note: The Jeffersons played in seven NFL games during the 1925 season. Kelly's page on Pro-Football-Reference.com states that he appeared in six of them. The box score of the Jeffersons-Bisons game does not list Kelly, meaning that this was the one game where he did not play.) In their next game of NFL play, Rochester lost 13–33 against the Green Bay Packers, after which they traveled to Providence, Rhode Island, and lost 0–17 to the Providence Steam Roller. On November 8, the Jeffersons played an exhibition match against the Hartford Blues. A report in the Hartford Courant prior to the game said, "Heading the bulwark of stalwarts on the Jefferson frontier is Tex Kelly, a midget tackler of some 240 pounds displacement." The Blues won, 8–6, but Kelly received a special mention in the game recap as having "played best" for Rochester; he started at center and played throughout the entire match. Rochester played three more NFL games, losing all three, as they finished 16th in the league with a record of 0–6–1. Kelly appeared in a total of six games, starting four, playing at center, middle guard, left tackle, and right tackle.

The following season, Kelly played for the Buffalo Rangers, as the Jeffersons folded from the league. He appeared in between one and two games as a backup guard, as Buffalo finished ninth in the NFL with a 4–4–2 record. He was out of the NFL from 1927 to 1928, but made a final return in 1929, appearing in one match for the Orange Tornadoes as a substitute right tackle. He retired after the season, at the age of 31.

Throughout his career, Kelly (whose real name was Clarence) was known by the nicknames "Tex" and "Clancy." He stood at six feet, three inches tall during his playing career and usually weighed around 220 pounds. He could appear anywhere on the line, playing at different times the following positions: right guard, right tackle, right end, center, left tackle, left guard, and left end.

== Death ==
Kelly died on February 4, 1978, in Shawnee, Oklahoma, at the age of 79.
