= Quentin Klenk =

American football player (1919–1979)

- Klenk in 1940, the "Bruin Hunter"

No. 21, 19, 58, 48, 47, 31
- Positions: Tackle, placekicker

Personal information
- Born: February 13, 1919; Long Beach, California, U.S.
- Died: January 4, 1979 (aged 59); San Mateo, California, U.S.
- Listed height: 6 ft 2 in (1.88 m)
- Listed weight: 225 lb (102 kg)

Career information
- High school: Long Beach Polytechnic
- College: USC (1937-1940)
- NFL draft: 1945: 18th round, 184th overall pick

Career history
- Los Angeles Bulldogs (1941-1942); Los Angeles Mustangs (1943); Buffalo Bisons (1946); Chicago Rockets (1946); Los Angeles Bulldogs (1947); Long Beach Bulldogs (1948)

Career AAFC statistics
- Games played: 10
- Games started: 3
- Stats at Pro Football Reference

Quentin Earl Klenk (February 13, 1919 – January 4, 1979) was an American football tackle and placekicker.

Klenk was born in LaMoure, North Dakota, in 1919. He attended Long Beach Polytechnic High School where he was selected as the captain of the 1936 football team. He played college football for USC, earning varsity letters in 1939 and 1940.

Klenk began playing professional football Los Angeles Bulldogs of the Pacific Coast Professional Football League during the 1941 and 1942 seasons and for the Los Angeles Mustangs of the same league in 1943.

He was drafted by the Philadelphia Eagles in the 18th round (184th overall pick) of the 1945 NFL draft, but did not play for the Eagles. He instead played professional football in the All-America Football Conference (AAFC) for the Buffalo Bisons at the start of the 1946 season. He was released by Buffalo on September 23 and signed by the Chicago Rockets on October 1, largely due to his talent for "jet-propelled" kickoffs. He appeared in a total of 10 games for the Bisons and Rockets during the 1946 season, three of them as a starter.

Klenk returned to the west coast, again playing for the Los Angeles Bulldogs during the 1947 season. In 1948, he played for the Long Beach Bulldogs.

Klenk died in 1979 in San Mateo, California.
