= 1943 All-SEC football team =

American college football all-star team

The 1943 All-SEC football team consists of American football players selected to the All-Southeastern Conference (SEC) chosen by various selectors for the 1943 college football season. Georgia Tech won the conference.

== All-SEC selections ==
=== Ends ===
- Phil Tinsley, Georgia Tech (AP-1)
- Ray Olson, Tulane (AP-1)
- Charles Webb, LSU (AP-2)
- Walter Kilzer, Georgia Tech (AP-2)

=== Tackles ===
- Joe Hartley, LSU (AP-1)
- Bill Chambers, Georgia Tech (AP-1)
- Fred Roseman, Tulane (AP-2)
- George Jones, Tulane (AP-2)

=== Guards ===
- John Steber, Georgia Tech (AP-1)
- Gaston Bourgeois, Tulane (AP-1)
- Carl Janneck, LSU (AP-2)
- Buster Beall, Georgia Tech (AP-2)

=== Centers ===
- Buddy Gatewood, Tulane (AP-1)
- George Manning, Georgia Tech (AP-2)

=== Quarterbacks ===
- Joe Renfroe, Tulane (AP-1)
- Leonard Finley, Tulane (AP-2)

=== Halfbacks ===
- Eddie Prokop, Georgia Tech (AP-1)
- Johnny Cook, Georgia (AP-1)
- Harry Robinson, Vanderbilt (AP-2)
- Charles Smith, Georgia (AP-2)

=== Fullbacks ===
- Steve Van Buren, LSU (AP-1)
- Mickey Logan, Georgia Tech(AP-2)

== Key ==
AP = Associated Press.

== See also ==
- 1943 College Football All-America Team
