= Frank Brogger =

American athlete and coach (1923–1988)

Biographical details
- Born: June 11, 1923; Saginaw, Michigan, U.S.
- Died: July 23, 1988 (aged 65); Saginaw, Michigan, U.S.

Playing career

Football
- 1944: Michigan State

Baseball
- 1944: York White Roses
- Positions: End (football) pitcher (baseball)

Coaching career (HC unless noted)

Football
- 1947–1949: Saginaw St. Andrews HS (MI)
- 1951–1954: St. Ambrose

Head coaching record
- Overall: 19–17 (college)

Accomplishments and honors

Championships
- 1 Iowa Conference (1951); 1 Iowa Conference Southern Division (1951)

Frank E. Brogger (June 11, 1923 – July 23, 1988) was a minor league baseball player and an American football player and coach. He served as the head football coach at St. Ambrose University in Davenport, Iowa from 1951 to 1954 after having been a high school coach in the Saginaw, Michigan area.

Brogger spent one season with the York White Roses of the Class B Interstate League in 1944.

== Head coaching record ==
=== College ===
Year	Team	Overall	Conference	Standing	Bowl/playoffs
St. Ambrose Fighting Bees (Iowa Conference / Midlands Conference) (1951)
1951	St. Ambrose	9–2	5–0 / 2–1	1st (Southern) / 2nd	
St. Ambrose Fighting Bees (Midlands Conference) (1952)
1952	St. Ambrose	4–5	2–2	3rd	
St. Ambrose Fighting Bees (Independent) (1953–1954)
1953	St. Ambrose	2–6			
1954	St. Ambrose	4–4			
St. Ambrose:		19–17	9–3		
Total:		19–17			
National championship Conference title Conference division title or championship game berth
