= Gregg Browning =

American football player (1922–2007)

No. 80
- Position: End

Personal information
- Born: January 12, 1922; Trinidad, Colorado, U.S.
- Died: February 1, 2007 (aged 85); Denver, Colorado, U.S.
- Listed height: 6 ft 0 in (1.83 m)
- Listed weight: 190 lb (86 kg)

Career information
- High school: Trinidad
- College: Denver
- NFL draft: 1945: 6th round, 46th overall pick

Career history
- New York Giants (1947)

Career NFL statistics
- Receptions: 1
- Receiving yards: 12
- Stats at Pro Football Reference

Gregg Browning Jr. (January 12, 1922 – February 1, 2007) was an American professional football end who played one season in the National Football League (NFL) with the New York Giants. He played college football at the University of Denver for the Denver Pioneers football team. He was drafted by the Pittsburgh Steelers in the sixth round of the 1945 NFL draft with the 46th overall pick.
