= Steve Enich =

American football player (1923–2004)

No. 66
- Position: Guard

Personal information
- Born: April 21, 1923; Hibbing, Minnesota, U.S.
- Died: November 10, 2004 (aged 81); Elm Grove, Wisconsin, U.S.
- Listed height: 5 ft 10 in (1.78 m)
- Listed weight: 212 lb (96 kg)

Career information
- High school: Hibbing
- College: Marquette (1942-1943)
- NFL draft: 1945: 4th round, 30th overall pick

Career history
- Chicago Cardinals (1945)

Career NFL statistics
- Games played: 5
- Games started: 1
- Fumble recoveries: 1
- Stats at Pro Football Reference

Steve Enich (1923–2004) was an American sportsman who played guard in the National Football League. He was drafted in the fourth round of the 1945 NFL draft by the Boston Yanks and played that season with the Chicago Cardinals.
