= Jim Keane (American football) =

American football player (1924–2011)

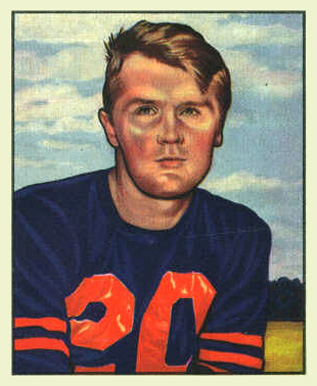

No. 20, 81
- Positions: End, defensive end

Personal information
- Born: January 11, 1924; Bellaire, Ohio, U.S.
- Died: March 8, 2011 (aged 87); Lake Forest, Illinois, U.S.
- Listed height: 6 ft 4 in (1.93 m)
- Listed weight: 217 lb (98 kg)

Career information
- High school: Linsly Military Institute (Wheeling, West Virginia)
- College: Northwestern; Iowa (1941-1942)
- NFL draft: 1945: 18th round, 182nd overall pick

Career history
- Chicago Bears (1946–1951); Saskatchewan Roughriders (1952); Green Bay Packers (1952)

Awards and highlights
- NFL champion (1946)

Career NFL statistics
- Receptions: 224
- Receiving yards: 3,222
- Receiving touchdowns: 24
- Stats at Pro Football Reference

James Patrick Keane (January 11, 1924 – March 8, 2011) was a professional American football end in the National Football League (NFL). He played seven seasons for the Chicago Bears (1946–1951) and the Green Bay Packers (1952).

== NFL career statistics ==
Legend
	Won the NFL championship
	Led the league
**Bold**	Career high

=== Regular season ===
Year	Team	Games		Receiving				
Year	Team	GP	GS	Rec	Yds	Avg	Lng	TD
1946	CHI	11	0	14	331	**23.6**	42	3
1947	CHI	12	3	**64**	**910**	14.2	50	**10**
1948	CHI	11	4	30	414	13.8	53	3
1949	CHI	12	6	47	696	14.8	39	6
1950	CHI	12	4	36	433	12.0	**70**	0
1951	CHI	12	2	15	247	16.5	37	1
1952	GNB	11	4	18	191	10.6	29	1
Career		81	23	224	3,222	14.4	70	24

=== Playoffs ===
Year	Team	Games		Receiving				
Year	Team	GP	GS	Rec	Yds	Avg	Lng	TD
1946	CHI	1	0	2	25	12.5	-	0
1950	CHI	1	1	**3**	**50**	**16.7**	**19**	0
Career		2	1	5	75	15.0	19	0
