= John Kondrla =

American football player (1921–2005)

- Kondrla, circa 1942

No. 62
- Position: Tackle

Personal information
- Born: February 23, 1921; Republic, Pennsylvania, U.S.
- Died: May 27, 2005 (aged 84)
- Listed height: 6 ft 2 in (1.88 m)
- Listed weight: 195 lb (88 kg)

Career information
- High school: Georges Township
- College: Saint Vincent
- NFL draft: 1945: 30th round, 310th overall pick

Career history
- Pittsburgh Steelers (1945)
- Stats at Pro Football Reference

John Joseph Kondrla (February 23, 1921 – May 27, 2005) was an American professional football tackle who played for the Pittsburgh Steelers of the National Football League (NFL). He played college football for the Saint Vincent Bearcats and was selected by the Steelers in the 30th round of the 1945 NFL draft.

== Early life ==
John Joseph Kondrla was born on February 23, 1921, in Republic, Pennsylvania. He attended Georges Township High School in Pennsylvania.

== College career ==
Kondrla played college football, baseball, and basketball for the Bearcats of Saint Vincent College. His final season was in 1942. He was a tackle in football. Kondrla graduated from Saint Vincent in January 1943. He was part of the first-ever Saint Vincent basketball team during the 1942–43 season. He reported to the Army Air Corps on February 22, 1943.

== Professional career ==
Kondrla was selected by the Pittsburgh Steelers in the 30th round, with the 310th overall pick, of the 1945 NFL draft. He played in one game for the Steelers during the 1945 season as a reserve tackle.

== Personal life ==
Kondrla died on May 27, 2005.
