= Ken Keuper =

American football player (1918–1997)

No. 18, 20
- Position: Back

Personal information
- Born: November 14, 1918; Waukesha, Wisconsin, U.S.
- Died: May 23, 1997 (aged 78); Warner Robins, Georgia, U.S.
- Listed height: 6 ft 0 in (1.83 m)
- Listed weight: 207 lb (94 kg)

Career information
- High school: Waukesha
- College: Georgia (1939-1942)
- NFL draft: 1945: undrafted

Career history
- Green Bay Packers (1945–1947); New York Giants (1948)

Career NFL statistics
- Rushing yards: 14
- Rushing average: 2.3
- Receptions: 2
- Receiving yards: 37
- Stats at Pro Football Reference

Kenneth Erwin "Red" Keuper (November 14, 1918 – May 23, 1997) was a player in the National Football League for the Green Bay Packers and New York Giants from 1945 to 1948. He played at the college football at the University of Georgia.

== Biography ==
Keuper was born on November 14, 1918, in Waukesha, Wisconsin.
