= Mike Kasap =

American football player (1922–1994)

- Mike Kasap, 1943

No. 46
- Position: Tackle

Personal information
- Born: November 20, 1922; Oglesby, Illinois, U.S.
- Died: October 20, 1994 (aged 71); LaSalle, Illinois, U.S.
- Listed height: 6 ft 2 in (1.88 m)
- Listed weight: 255 lb (116 kg)

Career information
- High school: LaSalle-Peru (IL)
- College: Illinois; Purdue
- NFL draft: 1945: 12th round, 115th overall pick

Career history
- Baltimore Colts (1947)

Career AAFC statistics
- Games played: 12
- Games started: 3
- Stats at Pro Football Reference

Mike E. "Battleship" Kasap (November 20, 1922 – October 20, 1994) was an American football player who played at the tackle position.

A native of Oglesby, Illinois, he played college football at Illinois and Purdue. He was drafted by the Detroit Lions in the 12th round (115th overall pick) of the 1945 NFL draft but did not play for the Lions. He played professional football in the All-America Football Conference (AAFC) for the Baltimore Colts during the 1947 season. He appeared in a total of 12 AAFC games, three as a starter.

He coached the hockey and football teams at the University of Vermont from 1948 to 1951.

Kasap died in 1994 at LaSalle, Illinois.
