= 1945 NFL draft =

National Football League draft

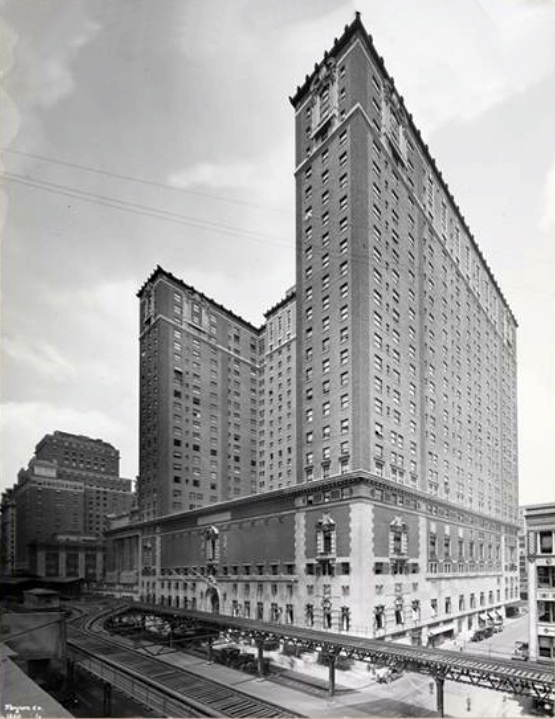
- Commodore Hotel (location of the draft)

General information
- Date: April 8, 1945
- Location: Commodore Hotel in New York City, NY

Overview
- 330 total selections in 32 rounds
- League: NFL
- First selection: Charley Trippi, HB; Chicago Cardinals
- Most selections (30): each team made 30 picks
- Fewest selections (30): each team made 30 picks
- Hall of Famers: 5: RB Charley Trippi; WR Elroy Hirsch; E Pete Pihos; WR Tom Fears; DT Arnie Weinmeister

The 1945 NFL draft was held on April 8, 1945, at the Commodore Hotel in New York City, New York. Perhaps as a tip of the hat to wartime sensibilities, the 1945 draft was officially called the "1944 Preferred Negotiations List" by the league.

With the first overall pick of the draft, the Chicago Cardinals selected halfback Charley Trippi.

Although there were formally 32 rounds of the draft, each of the 11 teams made a total of 30 selections, with a total of 330 players chosen. A total of 22 players were selected before they became eligible for the draft under league rules. These draft choices were forfeited by the team and are noted below. The actual number of drafted-and-eligible players chosen in the 1945 draft was thus 308.

== Player selections ==
= Pro Bowler	= Hall of Famer

=== Round 1 ===
Pick #	NFL team	Player	Position	College
1	Chicago Cardinals	Charley Trippi	Halfback	Georgia
2	Pittsburgh Steelers	Paul Duhart	Halfback	Florida
3	Brooklyn Tigers	Joe Renfroe	Back	Tulane
4	Boston Yanks	Eddie Prokop	Back	Georgia Tech
5	Cleveland Rams	Elroy Hirsch	Flanker	Michigan
6	Detroit Lions	Frank Szymanski	Center	Notre Dame
7	Chicago Bears	Don Lund	Back	Michigan
8	Washington Redskins	Jim Hardy	Quarterback	USC
9	Philadelphia Eagles	John Yonakor	Defensive end	Notre Dame
10	New York Giants	Elmer Barbour	Quarterback	Wake Forest
11	Green Bay Packers	Walt Schlinkman	Fullback	Texas Tech

=== Round 2 ===
Pick #	NFL team	Player	Position	College
12	Pittsburgh Steelers	Jack Dugger	End	Ohio State
13	Brooklyn Tigers	Wayne Williams	Back	Minnesota
14	Chicago Cardinals	Paul Collins	Back	Missouri
15	Boston Yanks	Tom Dean	Tackle	SMU
16	Cleveland Rams	Milan Lazetich	Tackle	Michigan

=== Round 3 ===
Pick #	NFL team	Player	Position	College
17	Brooklyn Tigers	Cecil Gray	Center	Oregon
18	Chicago Cardinals	Walter Watt	Back	Miami (FL)
19	Pittsburgh Steelers (Not yet eligible for selection, pick forfeited).	Bill Dellastatious	Back	Missouri
20	Boston Yanks	Damon Tassos	Guard	Texas A&M
21	Cleveland Rams	Dub Wooten	End	Oklahoma
22	Chicago Bears	Charley Allen	Back	SMU
23	Washington Redskins	Tree Adams	Tackle	Notre Dame
24	Detroit Lions	Stan Mohrbacher	Guard	Iowa
25	Philadelphia Eagles	Alvin Dark	Back	LSU
26	New York Giants	Gordon Appleby	Center	Ohio State
27	Green Bay Packers	Clyde Goodnight	End	Tulsa

=== Round 4 ===
Pick #	NFL team	Player	Position	College
28	Chicago Cardinals	Bob Dobelstein	Guard	Tennessee
29	Pittsburgh Steelers (Not yet eligible for selection, pick forfeited).	Roger Adams	Center	Florida
30	Brooklyn Tigers	Steve Enich	Guard	Marquette
31	Boston Yanks	Don Deeks	Tackle	Washington
32	Cleveland Rams	Jack Zilly	End	Notre Dame

=== Round 5 ===
Pick #	NFL team	Player	Position	College
33	Pittsburgh Steelers	Chuck Mehelich	End	Duquesne
34	Brooklyn Tigers	Al Kowalski	Quarterback	Tulsa
35	Chicago Cardinals	Zeke Chronister	End	TCU
36	Boston Yanks (Not yet eligible for selection, pick forfeited).	Johnny Strzykalski	Back	Marquette
37	Cleveland Rams	Roger Harding	Center	California
38	Washington Redskins	George Bujan	Center	Oregon
39	Detroit Lions	Bob Wiese	Back	Michigan
40	Chicago Bears	Forest Masterson	Center	Iowa
41	Philadelphia Eagles	Pete Pihos	End	Indiana
42	New York Giants	Ed Castleberry	Back	West Texas State
43	Green Bay Packers	Joe Graham	End	Florida

=== Round 6 ===
Pick #	NFL team	Player	Position	College
44	Brooklyn Tigers	Dick Barwegan	Guard	Purdue
45	Chicago Cardinals	Corwin Clatt	Back	Notre Dame
46	Pittsburgh Steelers	Gregg Browning	End	Denver
47	Boston Yanks	Jim Mello	Back	Notre Dame
48	Cleveland Rams	Jerry Cowhig	Back	Notre Dame
49	Detroit Lions	Gene Fekete	Back	Ohio State
50	Chicago Bears	Wayne Shaw	Back	SMU
51	Washington Redskins	Johnny North	End	Vanderbilt
52	Philadelphia Eagles	Chuck Dellago	Guard	Minnesota
53	New York Giants	Barney Poole	End	Ole Miss
54	Green Bay Packers	Don Wells	Tackle	Georgia

=== Round 7 ===
Pick #	NFL team	Player	Position	College
55	Chicago Cardinals	Ziggy Czarobski	Tackle	Notre Dame
56	Pittsburgh Steelers	Mike Wolak	Back	Duquesne
57	Brooklyn Tigers	Louie Futrell	Back	Fresno State
58	Boston Yanks	Marty Silovich	Center	Marquette
59	Cleveland Rams	Fred Negus	Center	Wisconsin
60	Chicago Bears	Glen Burgeis	Tackle	Tulsa
61	Washington Redskins	John Steber	Guard	Georgia Tech
62	Detroit Lions	Mike Jarmoluk	Tackle	Temple
63	Philadelphia Eagles	Gonzalo Morales	Back	St. Mary's (CA)
64	New York Giants	Jack Mead	End	Wisconsin
65	Green Bay Packers	Casey Stephenson	Back	Tennessee

=== Round 8 ===
Pick #	NFL team	Player	Position	College
66	Pittsburgh Steelers	Tom Hughes	Tackle	Missouri
67	Brooklyn Tigers	John Dodds	Guard	California
68	Chicago Cardinals	John Harrington	End	Marquette
69	Boston Yanks	Ellis Jones	Guard	Tulsa
70	Cleveland Rams	Johnny August	Back	Alabama
71	Washington Redskins	Art Porter	End	Tulane
72	Detroit Lions	Jack Lowther	Back	Detroit
73	Chicago Bears	Pat O'Brien	Tackle	Purdue
74	Philadelphia Eagles	Sam Robinson	Back	Washington
75	New York Giants	Nick Vodick	Back	Northwestern
76	Green Bay Packers	Toby Collins	Tackle	Tulsa

=== Round 9 ===
Pick #	NFL team	Player	Position	College
77	Brooklyn Tigers	Elting Johnson	Back	Bucknell
78	Chicago Cardinals	Gene Meeks	Back	Kentucky
79	Pittsburgh Steelers	Leon Pense	Back	Arkansas
80	Boston Yanks	Earl Lambert	Back	Manhattan
81	Cleveland Rams	Dick Huffman	Tackle	Tennessee
82	Detroit Lions	Les Joop	Tackle	Illinois
83	Chicago Bears	Bill Mayther	Center	Oregon
84	Washington Redskins	Curt Kuykendall	Back	Auburn
85	Philadelphia Eagles	Forrest Hall	Back	San Francisco
86	New York Giants	John Rudan	Back	Marquette
87	Green Bay Packers	Lamar Dingler	End	Arkansas

=== Round 10 ===
Pick #	NFL team	Player	Position	College
88	Chicago Cardinals	Bill Huber	End	Notre Dame
89	Pittsburgh Steelers	Art Brandau	Center	Tennessee
90	Brooklyn Tigers	Roy Cross	End	Tennessee
91	Boston Yanks	Don Kasprzak	Back	Dartmouth
92	Cleveland Rams	Vern Walters	Back	Alma
93	Chicago Bears	Bill Poe	Back	Clemson
94	Washington Redskins	Frank Brogger	End	Michigan State
95	Detroit Lions	Paul Walker	End	Yale
96	Philadelphia Eagles	Joe Sadonis	Tackle	Fordham
97	New York Giants	Vic Smith	Back	UCLA
98	Green Bay Packers	Hal Helscher	Back	LSU

=== Round 11 ===
Pick #	NFL team	Player	Position	College
99	Pittsburgh Steelers	Ray Ball	Back	Holy Cross
100	Brooklyn Tigers	Earl Haury	Tackle	Kansas State
101	Chicago Cardinals	Halley Heard	Tackle	LSU
102	Boston Yanks	Ben Jones	End	Arkansas
103	Cleveland Rams	Tom Fears	End	UCLA
104	Washington Redskins	Mack Creger	Back	Northwestern
105	Detroit Lions	Howie Hansen	Tackle	Utah State
106	Chicago Bears	Chuck Avery	Back	Minnesota
107	Philadelphia Eagles	Rudy Mobley	Back	Hardin–Simmons
108	New York Giants	Jim Young	Tackle	Arkansas
109	Green Bay Packers	Ralph Hammond	Center	Pittsburgh

=== Round 12 ===
Pick #	NFL team	Player	Position	College
110	Brooklyn Tigers	John Martin	Back	East Tennessee State
111	Chicago Cardinals	Bob Cowan	Back	Indiana
112	Pittsburgh Steelers (Not yet eligible for selection, pick forfeited).	Frank Basilone	Back	Duquesne
113	Boston Yanks	Herb Coleman	Center	Notre Dame
114	Cleveland Rams	Joe Winkler	Center	Purdue
115	Detroit Lions	Mike Kasap	Tackle	Illinois
116	Chicago Bears	Jack Boyd	Back	UCLA
117	Washington Redskins	Paul McKee	End	Syracuse
118	Philadelphia Eagles	Jim Newmeyer	Tackle	St. Vincent
119	New York Giants	Billy Bevis	Back	Tennessee
120	Green Bay Packers	Ed Podgorski	Tackle	Lafayette

=== Round 13 ===
Pick #	NFL team	Player	Position	College
121	Chicago Cardinals	Buddy Luper	Back	Duke
122	Pittsburgh Steelers	John Monahan	End	Dartmouth
123	Brooklyn Tigers	George McDonald	Tackle	South Carolina
124	Boston Yanks	Joe Pezelski	Back	Villanova
125	Cleveland Rams	Jack Aland	Tackle	Alabama
126	Chicago Bears	Ralph Ellsworth	Back	Texas
127	Washington Redskins	Charlie Conerly	Quarterback	Ole Miss
128	Detroit Lions	Wally Hopp	Back	Nebraska
129	Philadelphia Eagles	Bill Chambers	Tackle	UCLA
130	New York Giants	Bob Boozer	Tackle	Arkansas
131	Green Bay Packers	Bill Hackett	Guard	Ohio State

=== Round 14 ===
Pick #	NFL team	Player	Position	College
132	Pittsburgh Steelers	Mel Odelli	Back	Duquesne
133	Brooklyn Tigers	Hal Self	Back	Alabama
134	Chicago Cardinals	Solon Barnett	Guard	Baylor
135	Boston Yanks	John DiGangi	Tackle	Holy Cross
136	Cleveland Rams	Chuck Uknes	Back	Iowa
137	Washington Redskins	John Putnik	End	Utah State
138	Detroit Lions	Ben Trickey	Back	Iowa
139	Chicago Bears	Frank Mattioli	Guard	Pittsburgh
140	Philadelphia Eagles	John Duda	Back	Virginia
141	New York Giants	Stan Rhoades	Back	Mississippi State
142	Green Bay Packers	Marv Lindsey	Back	Arkansas

=== Round 15 ===
Pick #	NFL team	Player	Position	College
143	Brooklyn Tigers	Tom Reilly	Guard	Fordham
144	Chicago Cardinals	Gordon Carver	Back	Duke
145	Pittsburgh Steelers (Not yet eligible for selection, pick forfeited).	George Connor	Tackle	Notre Dame
146	Boston Yanks	Chan Highsmith	Center	North Carolina
147	Cleveland Rams (Not yet eligible for selection, pick forfeited).	Bill Lund	Back	Case Western Reserve
148	Detroit Lions	Windell Williams	End	Rice
149	Chicago Bears	Merle Gibson	End	TCU
150	Washington Redskins	Eddie Saenz	Back	USC
151	Philadelphia Eagles	Bill Montgomery	Back	LSU
152	New York Giants	Jack Wink	Back	Wisconsin
153	Green Bay Packers	Buster McClure	Tackle	Nevada

=== Round 16 ===
Pick #	NFL team	Player	Position	College
154	Chicago Cardinals (Not yet eligible for selection, pick forfeited).	John Cannady	Back	Indiana
155	Pittsburgh Steelers	Jim Ungles	Back	Kansas State
156	Brooklyn Tigers	Skimp Harrison	End	South Carolina
157	Boston Yanks	Mike Costello	End	Georgetown
158	Cleveland Rams	Bob Barton	End	Holy Cross
159	Chicago Bears	John Creevey	Back	Notre Dame
160	Washington Redskins	Dom Fusci	Tackle	South Carolina
161	Detroit Lions	Wayne Flanigan	End	Denver
162	Philadelphia Eagles	Howard Werner	End	Syracuse
163	New York Giants	Jim Little	Tackle	Kentucky
164	Green Bay Packers	Harry Pieper	Center	California

=== Round 17 ===
Pick #	NFL team	Player	Position	College
165	Pittsburgh Steelers	John Itzel	Back	Pittsburgh
166	Brooklyn Tigers	Arnie Weinmeister	Defensive Tackle	Washington
167	Chicago Cardinals	Ben Cittadino	End	Duke
168	Boston Yanks	Paul Dromgoole	End	Manhattan
169	Cleveland Rams	Dick Hoerner	Back	Iowa
170	Washington Redskins	Bobby Tom Jenkins	Back	Alabama
171	Detroit Lions	O.J. Key	Back	Tulane
172	Chicago Bears	Nick Sacrinty	Back	Wake Forest
173	Philadelphia Eagles	Jim Austin	Back	Missouri
174	New York Giants	Bob Jabbusch	Guard	Ohio State
175	Green Bay Packers	Bob Kula	Back	Minnesota

=== Round 18 ===
Pick #	NFL team	Player	Position	College
176	Brooklyn Tigers	Virgil Eikenberg	Back	Rice
177	Chicago Cardinals	Ralph Strayhorn	Guard	North Carolina
178	Pittsburgh Steelers	Alex Wizbicki	Back	Holy Cross
179	Boston Yanks	Dolph Czekala	Tackle	Syracuse
180	Cleveland Rams	Lee Kennon	Tackle	Oklahoma
181	Detroit Lions	Jim McWhorter	Back	Alabama
182	Chicago Bears	Jim Keane	End	Iowa
183	Washington Redskins (Not yet eligible for selection, pick forfeited).	Ed Stacco	Tackle	Colgate
184	Philadelphia Eagles	Quentin Klenk	Tackle	USC
185	New York Giants	Bill Byrd	Center	Maryland
186	Green Bay Packers	Frank Hazard	Guard	Nebraska

=== Round 19 ===
Pick #	NFL team	Player	Position	College
187	Chicago Cardinals	John Andretich	Back	Purdue
188	Pittsburgh Steelers	Jim Landrigan	Tackle	Dartmouth
189	Brooklyn Tigers	Al Kasulin	Back	Villanova
190	Boston Yanks	Joe Drumm	Tackle	Georgetown
191	Cleveland Rams	Eagle Matulich	Back	Mississippi State
192	Chicago Bears	Bruno Niedziela	Tackle	Iowa
193	Washington Redskins	Jim Bradshaw	Center	Auburn
194	Detroit Lions	Clyde LeForce	Back	Tulsa
195	Philadelphia Eagles	Joe Spencer	Tackle	Oklahoma A&M
196	New York Giants	Glenn Morries	Tackle	Texas
197	Green Bay Packers	Ed Jeffers	Tackle	Oklahoma A&M

=== Round 20 ===
Pick #	NFL team	Player	Position	College
198	Pittsburgh Steelers	Bill Lilienthal	Tackle	Villanova
199	Brooklyn Tigers	Charley Lively	Tackle	Arkansas
200	Chicago Cardinals	Jack Kramer	Tackle	Marquette
201	Boston Yanks	Mario Giannelli	Tackle	Boston College
202	Cleveland Rams	Bill Griffin	Tackle	Kentucky
203	Washington Redskins	Bill Shipkey	Back	Stanford
204	Detroit Lions	Mike Castronis	Guard	Georgia
205	Chicago Bears	Broughton Williams	End	Florida
206	Philadelphia Eagles	Leo Pratt	Tackle	Oklahoma A&M
207	New York Giants	Pete Davis	Back	Santa Clara
208	Green Bay Packers	Bill Prentice	Back	Santa Clara

=== Round 21 ===
Pick #	NFL team	Player	Position	College
209	Brooklyn Tigers	Ted Curran	Back	Iowa
210	Chicago Cardinals	Red Cheek	Guard	Baylor
211	Pittsburgh Steelers	Art Price	Back	Rutgers
212	Boston Yanks	Eric Jamison	Tackle	San Francisco
213	Cleveland Rams	Leroy Erickson	Back	Oregon
214	Detroit Lions	Ken Currier	Guard	Wisconsin
215	Chicago Bears	Walt Stickel	Tackle	Penn
216	Washington Redskins	Sid Halliday	Tackle	SMU
217	Philadelphia Eagles	Phil Teschner	Tackle	Brown
218	New York Giants	Sam Vacanti	Back	Iowa
219	Green Bay Packers	Warren Fuller	End	Fordham

=== Round 22 ===
Pick #	NFL team	Player	Position	College
220	Chicago Cardinals	Fred Grant	Back	Alabama
221	Pittsburgh Steelers	Don Malmberg	Back	UCLA
222	Brooklyn Tigers (Not yet eligible for selection, pick forfeited).	Don Fabling	Back	Colorado
223	Boston Yanks	Walt Kretz	Back	Cornell
224	Cleveland Rams (Not yet eligible for selection, pick forfeited).	Ray Evans	Tackle	Texas Western
225	Chicago Bears	Bob Livingstone	Back	Notre Dame
226	Washington Redskins (Not yet eligible for selection, pick forfeited).	Chick Davidson	Tackle	Cornell
227	Detroit Lions	Jack Verutti	Back	St. Mary's (CA)
228	Philadelphia Eagles	John Magee	Guard	Rice
229	New York Giants	Vern Oliver	Center	Washington State
230	Green Bay Packers	Fred Neilsen	Tackle	St. Mary's (CA)

=== Round 23 ===
Pick #	NFL team	Player	Position	College
231	Pittsburgh Steelers	Everett Hartwell	End	Auburn
232	Brooklyn Tigers	Wally Crittenden	Back	USC
233	Chicago Cardinals (Not yet eligible for selection, pick forfeited).	Johnny Cook	Back	Georgia
234	Boston Yanks (Not yet eligible for selection, pick forfeited).	Marty Grbovaz	End	San Francisco
235	Cleveland Rams	Luke Higgins	Tackle	Notre Dame
236	Washington Redskins	Gabby Martin	End	SMU
237	Detroit Lions	Ray Olsen	Back	Tulane
238	Chicago Bears	Mike Vargon	End	Kansas State
239	Philadelphia Eagles	Monk Mosley	Back	Alabama
240	New York Giants	Jim Chadwell	Tackle	Tennessee
241	Green Bay Packers	Bob Gilmore	Back	Washington

=== Round 24 ===
Pick #	NFL team	Player	Position	College
242	Brooklyn Tigers	Jules Taddie	Center	Rochester
243	Chicago Cardinals	Ardie McClure	Tackle	Georgia
244	Pittsburgh Steelers	Ed Cain	Back	Rice
245	Boston Yanks	Ziggy Gory	Center	Villanova
246	Cleveland Rams	Stan Nowak	End	South Carolina
247	Detroit Lions	Russ Morrow	Center	Tennessee
248	Chicago Bears	Charley Wright	Guard	Iowa State
249	Washington Redskins	James McCurdy	Center	Washington
250	Philadelphia Eagles	Blair Brown	Guard	Oklahoma A&M
251	New York Giants	Vince Mroz	End	Michigan State
252	Green Bay Packers	Lloyd Baxter	Center	SMU

=== Round 25 ===
Pick #	NFL team	Player	Position	College
253	Chicago Cardinals	Hugo Norige	Back	Wooster
254	Pittsburgh Steelers	Angelo Carlaccini	Back	Pittsburgh
255	Brooklyn Tigers	Jerry Whitney	Back	USC
256	Boston Yanks (Not yet eligible for selection, pick forfeited).	Bill Iancelli	End	William & Mary
257	Cleveland Rams	Gene Konopka	Guard	Villanova
258	Chicago Bears	Jack Green	Guard	Alabama
259	Washington Redskins	Cecil Souders	End	Ohio State
260	Detroit Lions	Stan Green	Tackle	Oklahoma
261	Philadelphia Eagles	Bob Hall	End	Stanford
262	New York Giants	George Kita	Back	Drake
263	Green Bay Packers	Nolan Luhn	End	Tulsa

=== Round 26 ===
Pick #	NFL team	Player	Position	College
264	Pittsburgh Steelers	Ed Burns	Back	Boston College
265	Brooklyn Tigers (Not yet eligible for selection, pick forfeited).	Felix Trapani	Guard	LSU
266	Chicago Cardinals (Not yet eligible for selection, pick forfeited).	Red Knight	Back	LSU
267	Boston Yanks	Al Kull	Tackle	Fordham
268	Cleveland Rams	Ray Florek	Back	Illinois
269	Washington Redskins (Not yet eligible for selection, pick forfeited).	Ben Wall	Back	Western Michigan
270	Detroit Lions	Bob Ivory	Guard	Detroit
271	Chicago Bears	Lu Gambino	Back	Maryland
272	Philadelphia Eagles	Dan Talcott	Tackle	Nevada
273	New York Giants	Doug Graham	Tackle	Stanford
274	Green Bay Packers	Nestor Blanco	Guard	Colorado Mines

=== Round 27 ===
Pick #	NFL team	Player	Position	College
275	Brooklyn Tigers	Hal Finney	Back	USC
276	Chicago Cardinals	Don Fambrough	Back	Texas
277	Pittsburgh Steelers	Glen Stough	Tackle	Duke
278	Boston Yanks	Bob Mangene	Back	Boston College
279	Cleveland Rams	Russ Perry	Back	Wake Forest
280	Detroit Lions	Dell Taylor	Back	Tulsa
281	Chicago Bears	Ray Jones	Back	Texas
282	Washington Redskins	George Hillery	End	Texas Western
283	Philadelphia Eagles	Bill Thompson	Tackle	New Mexico
284	New York Giants	Jack Dillon	End	Texas Tech
285	Green Bay Packers	Bill Chestnut	Back	Kansas

=== Round 28 ===
Pick #	NFL team	Player	Position	College
286	Chicago Cardinals	Bulldog Williams	Tackle	Duke
287	Pittsburgh Steelers	Jim Marsh	Tackle	Oklahoma State
288	Brooklyn Tigers	Don Fauble	Back	Oklahoma
289	Boston Yanks	John Morelli	Guard	Georgetown
290	Cleveland Rams	Pat West	Back	USC
291	Chicago Bears	Bob Hary	Back	Minnesota
292	Washington Redskins	Milford Dreblow	Back	USC
293	Detroit Lions	Len Ciesla	Back	Creighton
294	Philadelphia Eagles	Al Fleming	Center	Wichita
295	New York Giants	Charley J'Anthony	Back	Brown
296	Green Bay Packers	Jim Thompson	Back	Washington State

=== Round 29 ===
Pick #	NFL team	Player	Position	College
297	Pittsburgh Steelers (Not yet eligible for selection, pick forfeited).	Ralph Grant	Back	Bucknell
298	Brooklyn Tigers	Nick Studen	Back	Denver
299	Chicago Cardinals	Ed Dusek	Back	Texas A&M
300	Boston Yanks	John Fisher	Center	Harvard
301	Cleveland Rams	Bill Davis	Back	Oregon
302	Washington Redskins (Not yet eligible for selection, pick forfeited).	Frank Irwin	Tackle	Duke
303	Detroit Lions	Frank Lopp	Tackle	Wisconsin
304	Chicago Bears	Nick Forkovitch	Back	William & Mary
305	Philadelphia Eagles	Leo Benjamin	Center	West Virginia
306	New York Giants	Ray Pipkin	Back	Arkansas
307	Green Bay Packers	Jim Evans	End	Idaho

=== Round 30 ===
Pick #	NFL team	Player	Position	College
308	Brooklyn Tigers (Not yet eligible for selection, pick forfeited).	LeMar Dykstra	Back	Colorado
309	Chicago Cardinals	Otto Payne	Back	Texas A&M
310	Pittsburgh Steelers	John Kondrla	Tackle	St. Vincent
311	Boston Yanks	Elmer Oberto	Guard	Georgetown
312	Cleveland Rams	Charley Compton	Tackle	Alabama
313	Detroit Lions	Paul Limont	End	Notre Dame
314	Chicago Bears	Don Robinson	Back	Michigan
315	Washington Redskins	Leon Diner	End	Denver
316	Philadelphia Eagles	Jim Dougherty	Back	Miami (OH)
317	New York Giants	Joe Wolf	Center	USC
318	Green Bay Packers (Not yet eligible for selection, pick forfeited).	Hamilton Nichols	Guard	Rice

=== Round 31 ===
Pick #	NFL team	Player	Position	College
319	Chicago Bears	Rusty Johnston	Back	Marquette
320	Washington Redskins	Bob Cummings	Center	Vanderbilt
321	Detroit Lions (Not yet eligible for selection, pick forfeited).	Ben Schadler	Back	Northwestern
322	Philadelphia Eagles	Ken Reese	Back	Alabama
323	New York Giants	Bill Broderick	Tackle	Utah
324	Green Bay Packers	John Priday	Back	Ohio State

=== Round 32 ===
Pick #	NFL team	Player	Position	College
325	Washington Redskins	Don Nolander	Tackle	Minnesota
326	Detroit Lions	Tom Dorais	Back	Detroit
327	Chicago Bears	George Groves	Center	Marquette
328	Philadelphia Eagles	Loren Braner	Center	Pittsburgh
329	New York Giants	John Staples	Guard	Alabama
330	Green Bay Packers	Billy Lee Aldridge	Back	Oklahoma A&M

= Hall of Famer

== Hall of Famers ==
- Charley Trippi, halfback from Georgia taken 1st round 1st overall by the Chicago Cardinals.

Inducted: Professional Football Hall of Fame class of 1968.

- Elroy “Crazylegs” Hirsch, wide receiver from Michigan taken 1st round 5th overall by the Cleveland Rams.

Inducted: Professional Football Hall of Fame class of 1968.

- Pete Pihos, defensive end from Indiana University (Bloomington) taken 5th round 41st overall by the Philadelphia Eagles.

Inducted: Professional Football Hall of Fame class of 1970.

- Tom Fears, end from the University of California, Los Angeles taken 11th round 103rd overall by the Cleveland Rams.

Inducted: Professional Football Hall of Fame class of 1970.

- Arnie Weinmeister, defensive tackle from Washington taken 17th round 166th overall by the Brooklyn Tigers.

Inducted: Professional Football Hall of Fame class of 1984.

== Notable undrafted players ==
^{†}	= Pro Bowler

Original NFL team	Player	Pos.	College	Notes
Cleveland Rams	Don Greenwood	B	Missouri	
Green Bay Packers	Ken Keuper	B	Georgia	
Philadelphia Eagles	Ben Agajanian	K	New Mexico	
Washington Redskins	Steve Bagarus	HB	Notre Dame	
Washington Redskins	Al Lolotai	G	Weber	
