= John Harrington (American football) =

American football player (1921–1992)

- Harrington in 1946

No. 55, 57
- Positions: End, defensive end

Personal information
- Born: April 15, 1921; Reedsburg, Wisconsin, U.S.
- Died: January 8, 1992 (aged 70); Green Bay, Wisconsin, U.S.
- Listed height: 6 ft 3 in (1.91 m)
- Listed weight: 198 lb (90 kg)

Career information
- High school: Reedsburg
- College: Marquette (1941-1942)
- NFL draft: 1945: 8th round, 68th overall pick

Career history
- Cleveland Browns (1946); Chicago Rockets (1947)

Awards and highlights
- AAFC champion (1946)

Career AAFC statistics
- Receptions: 25
- Receiving Yards: 369
- Touchdowns: 3
- Stats at Pro Football Reference

John Patrick Harrington (April 15, 1921 – January 8, 1992) was an American professional football end and defensive end who played two seasons for the Cleveland Browns and Chicago Rockets in the All-America Football Conference (AAFC). Harrington attended Marquette University and became the football team's captain in 1942. He joined the military in 1944 and played for Air Force teams in 1944 and 1945. He was drafted by the Chicago Cardinals in 1945 but instead signed with the Browns before the team's inaugural season in 1946. Harrington played in one season for the Browns before he was traded to the Rockets in 1947.

== Early life and college ==
Harrington was born and grew up in Reedsburg, Wisconsin; he also attended high school there. After graduating, he went to Marquette University in Milwaukee, Wisconsin, and played his first football game for the college team in 1941, when he was a sophomore. Harrington, who played as an end, had two touchdown catches in one of his first games against Kansas. In 1942, he was named the Marquette football team's captain.

Harrington then entered the Second Air Force during World War II and was the captain of the unit's Superbombers football team, who played in the Treasury Bond Bowl in 1944. In 1945, Harrington played with the Fourth Air Force's football team, the Flyers.

== Professional career ==
Harrington was drafted in the eighth round of the 1945 NFL draft by the Chicago Cardinals, but did not play for the team. In March 1946, the Cleveland Browns of the new All-America Football Conference (AAFC) announced that they had signed Harrington. He reported to the team's training camp several days late to finish summer school studies at Marquette, to which he had returned after his discharge from the Army. Competition in training camp was intense, and Harrington was thought to have little chance of making the Browns' roster. His number was not listed in the program for the Browns' first game against the Miami Seahawks, but Harrington put in a solid defensive performance in the 44–0 victory, tackling Miami's backs for losses several times. The Browns won the AAFC championship that year.

Before the 1947 season began, the Browns traded Harrington and Jim Daniell to the AAFC's Chicago Rockets for halfback Bill Boedeker.
