= Mark Kafentzis =

American football player (born 1958)

No. 23, 29
- Position: Defensive back

Personal information
- Born: June 30, 1958 (age 68); Richland, Washington, U.S.
- Listed height: 5 ft 10 in (1.78 m)
- Listed weight: 190 lb (86 kg)

Career information
- High school: Richland (WA) Columbia
- College: Hawaii
- NFL draft: 1982: 8th round, 199th overall pick

Career history
- Cleveland Browns (1982); Baltimore/Indianapolis Colts (1983–1984)

Career NFL statistics
- Interceptions: 1
- Touchdowns: 1
- Stats at Pro Football Reference

Mark Kevin Kafentzis (born June 30, 1958) is an American former professional football player who was a defensive back for three seasons in the National Football League (NFL) with the Cleveland Browns and Baltimore/Indianapolis Colts. He was selected by the Browns in the eighth round of the 1982 NFL draft. He played college football at Columbia Basin College and the University of Hawaiʻi at Mānoa.

== Early life ==
Kafentzis participated in high school football, wrestling and track for the Columbia High School Bombers of Richland, Washington. He earned All Big-Nine Conference and All-Area honors on offense and defense his senior year.

== College career ==
Kafentzis first played college football for the Columbia Basin College Hawks. He garnered All-Conference defensive back and All-American recognition as a kick return specialist. The Hawks won the National Junior College Football Championship in 1978. He was inducted into the Columbia Basin College Athletics Wall of Fame in 2012. Kafentzis transferred to play for the Hawaii Rainbow Warriors from 1980 to 1981. He was redshirted in 1979. He was named to the "All-Rainbow Team" of the 1980s. Kafentzis was named the 58th best player in the school's history by the Honolulu Star-Bulletin in 2009.

== Professional career ==
Kafentzis was selected by the Cleveland Browns with the 199th pick in the 1982 NFL draft and played in nine games for the team during the 1982 season. He played in 31 games, starting fifteen, for the Baltimore/Indianapolis Colts from 1983 to 1984. He was released by the Colts on August 20, 1985.

== Personal life ==
Kafentzis is the oldest of five brothers who played for the Hawaii Rainbow Warriors. His brothers Kurt, Kent and Kyle all signed with NFL teams. Mark was inducted into the Central Washington Sports Hall of Fame in 2004, the Northwest Athletic Conference Hall of Fame in 2012 and the Tri-Cities Sports Council Hall of Fame in 2003.
