= Matt Kelsh =

American football player (1904–1991)

Profile
- Position: End

Personal information
- Born: October 4, 1904; Dougherty, Iowa
- Died: August 8, 1991 (aged 86); Owatonna, Minnesota
- Listed height: 5 ft 11 in (1.80 m)
- Listed weight: 190 lb (86 kg)

Career information
- High school: Columbian Academy (IA)
- College: Iowa

Career history
- Brooklyn Dodgers (1930)

Matthew Leroy Kelsh (October 4, 1904 – August 8, 1991) was an American football player.

Kelsh was born in 1904 in Dougherty, Iowa, and Dougherty High School. He played college football as a halfback for the University of Iowa from 1927 to 1929. He was declared ineligible in October 1929 for having participated in a professional game.

Kelsh then played professional football in the National Football League (NFL) as an end for the Brooklyn Dodgers in 1930. He appeared in two NFL games.

Kelsh died in 1991 in Owatonna, Minnesota.
