= Ted Karras Sr. =

American football player (1934–2016)

Ted Karras
No. 61, 67, 62
- Positions: Guard, tackle, linebacker

Personal information
- Born: January 31, 1934; Gary, Indiana, U.S.
- Died: January 26, 2016 (aged 81); Crown Point, Indiana, U.S.
- Listed height: 6 ft 1 in (1.85 m)
- Listed weight: 245 lb (111 kg)

Career information
- High school: Emerson (IN)
- College: Indiana
- NFL draft: 1958: undrafted

Career history
- Pittsburgh Steelers (1958–1959); Chicago Bears (1960–1964); Detroit Lions (1965); Los Angeles Rams (1966)

Awards and highlights
- NFL champion (1963)

Career NFL statistics
- Games played: 108
- Games started: 88
- Fumble recoveries: 2
- Stats at Pro Football Reference

Theodore George Karras Sr. (January 31, 1934 – January 26, 2016) was a National Football League (NFL) player. He played for nine seasons with four teams, winning a championship with the Chicago Bears in 1963 as a guard. Karras played college football for Indiana University. His son, Ted Karras Jr., played college football for Northwestern University and in the NFL for the Washington Redskins in 1987 and is currently the head football coach at Marian University. His brothers, Lou Karras and Alex Karras, also played in the NFL. His grandson, Ted Karras III, played college football at the University of Illinois Urbana–Champaign, played for the New England Patriots winning two Super Bowls and now plays for the Cincinnati Bengals.
