= Ted Karras (offensive lineman) =

American football player (born 1993)

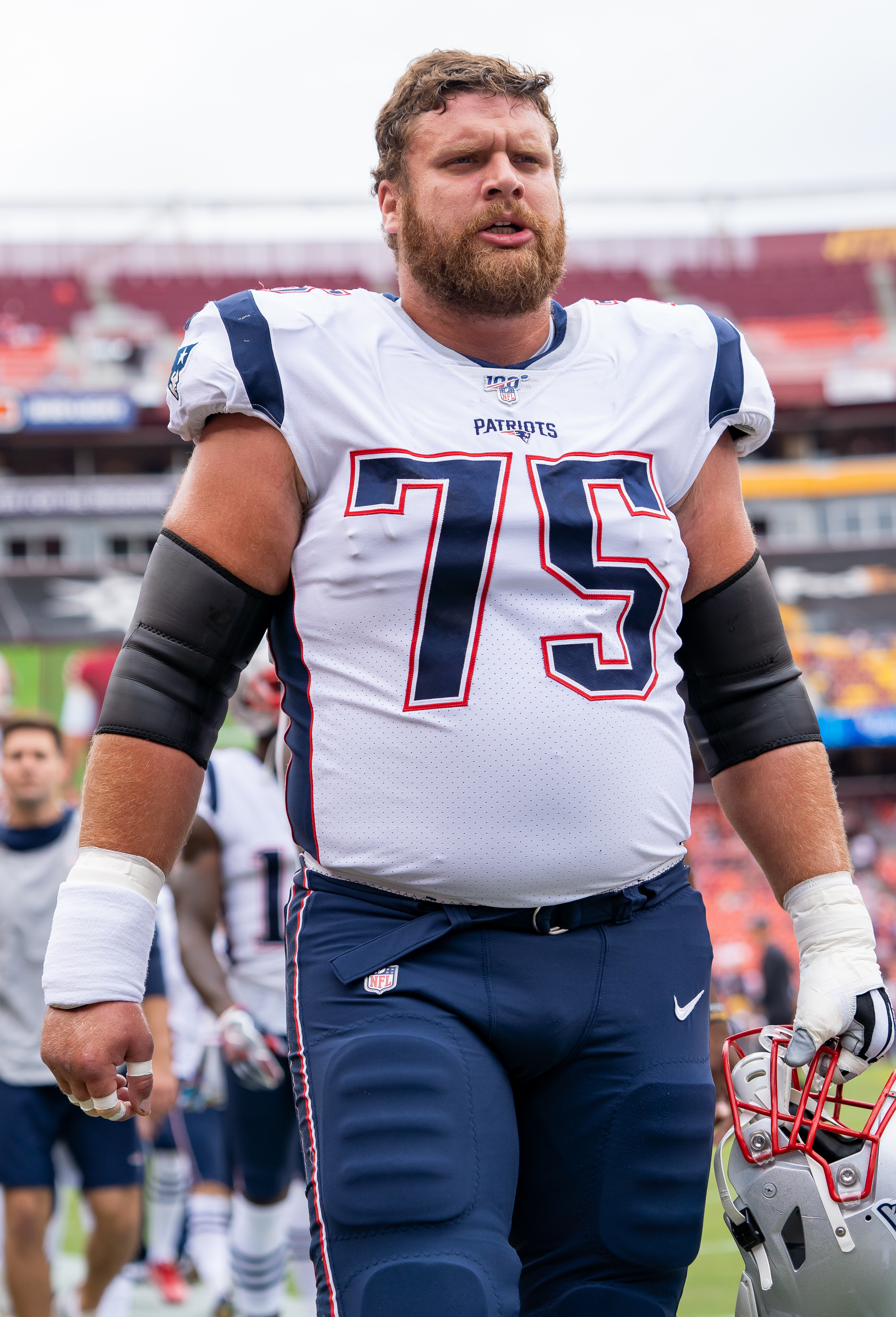
- Karras with the New England Patriots in 2019

No. 64 – Cincinnati Bengals
- Position: Center
- Roster status: Active

Personal information
- Born: March 15, 1993 (age 33); Chicago, Illinois, U.S.
- Listed height: 6 ft 4 in (1.93 m)
- Listed weight: 310 lb (141 kg)

Career information
- High school: Cathedral (Indianapolis, Indiana)
- College: Illinois (2011–2015)
- NFL draft: 2016: 6th round, 221st overall pick

Career history
- New England Patriots (2016–2019); Miami Dolphins (2020); New England Patriots (2021); Cincinnati Bengals (2022–present)

Awards and highlights
- 2× Super Bowl champion (LI, LIII)

Career NFL statistics as of Week 4, 2026
- Games played: 164
- Games started: 120
- Stats at Pro Football Reference

Theodore John Karras III (born March 15, 1993) is an American professional football center for the Cincinnati Bengals of the National Football League (NFL). He played college football for the Illinois Fighting Illini, and was selected in the sixth round of the 2016 NFL draft by the New England Patriots, with whom he won two Super Bowl championships. He spent the 2020 season with the Miami Dolphins before returning to New England the next season.

== Early life ==
Karras was born on March 15, 1993, to Jennifer and Ted Karras Jr. Raised in Indianapolis, Indiana, Karras attended Cathedral High School where he played football as an offensive lineman with the Fighting Irish Leprechauns. The 6 ft 4 in (1.93 m), 295 pounds (134 kg) Illinois native helped the Fighting Irish to win state championships in the 2008 and 2010 seasons. Karras earned All-State honors during the 2009 and 2010 seasons. Indiana Digest named Karras on its Top 15 selection. Rated a three-star recruiting prospect by Rivals.com and ESPN.com, Karras was also ranked among ESPN's Top 25 offensive guard prospects. Karras graduated in 2011 and received four collegiate football offers: Illinois, Indiana, Iowa State and UCLA.

== College career ==
Karras committed to Illinois over 15 other offers including his top four choices. After redshirting the 2011 season, Karras entered his first active season in 2012, starting as a right guard. His first start was made in the opening game defeating Western Michigan. Karras also proved instrumental in the Fighting Illini's 44–0 victory over Charleston Southern. He started in all 12 games of his first active season.

During his sophomore season in 2013, Karras suffered an ankle injury while at practice. This caused him to miss the opening season game against Southern Illinois. He returned to play as a starting right guard in 10 games during the season. His sophomore season performance earned him an offensive lineman accolade as he was part of the greatly improved offensive line of that year. Returning for his junior season in 2014, Karras started again as a right guard for the first nine games before sitting out the last four games due to a knee injury, sustained in the game against Ohio State. In his senior season in 2015, Karras played starting right guard during which he served also as team captain. He started in all 12 games of the season, totaling 43 starts during his collegiate career. Karras was named three times to the Academic All-Big Ten including in the 2012, 2014 and 2015 seasons. Karras earned a bachelor's degree in communications in 2014 with a plan to complete a master's program in the fields of recreation, sport and tourism.

== Professional career ==
Pre-draft measurables
Height	Weight	Arm length	Hand span	Wingspan	40-yard dash	10-yard split	20-yard split	20-yard shuttle	Three-cone drill	Vertical jump	Broad jump	Bench press
6 ft 3 3/4 in (1.92 m)	307 lb (139 kg)	32 1/2 in (0.83 m)	9 1/2 in (0.24 m)	6 ft 5 1/2 in (1.97 m)	5.34 s	1.88 s	3.07 s	4.70 s	8.15 s	26.5 in (0.67 m)	8 ft 10 in (2.69 m)	32 reps
All values from Pro Day

=== New England Patriots (first stint) ===
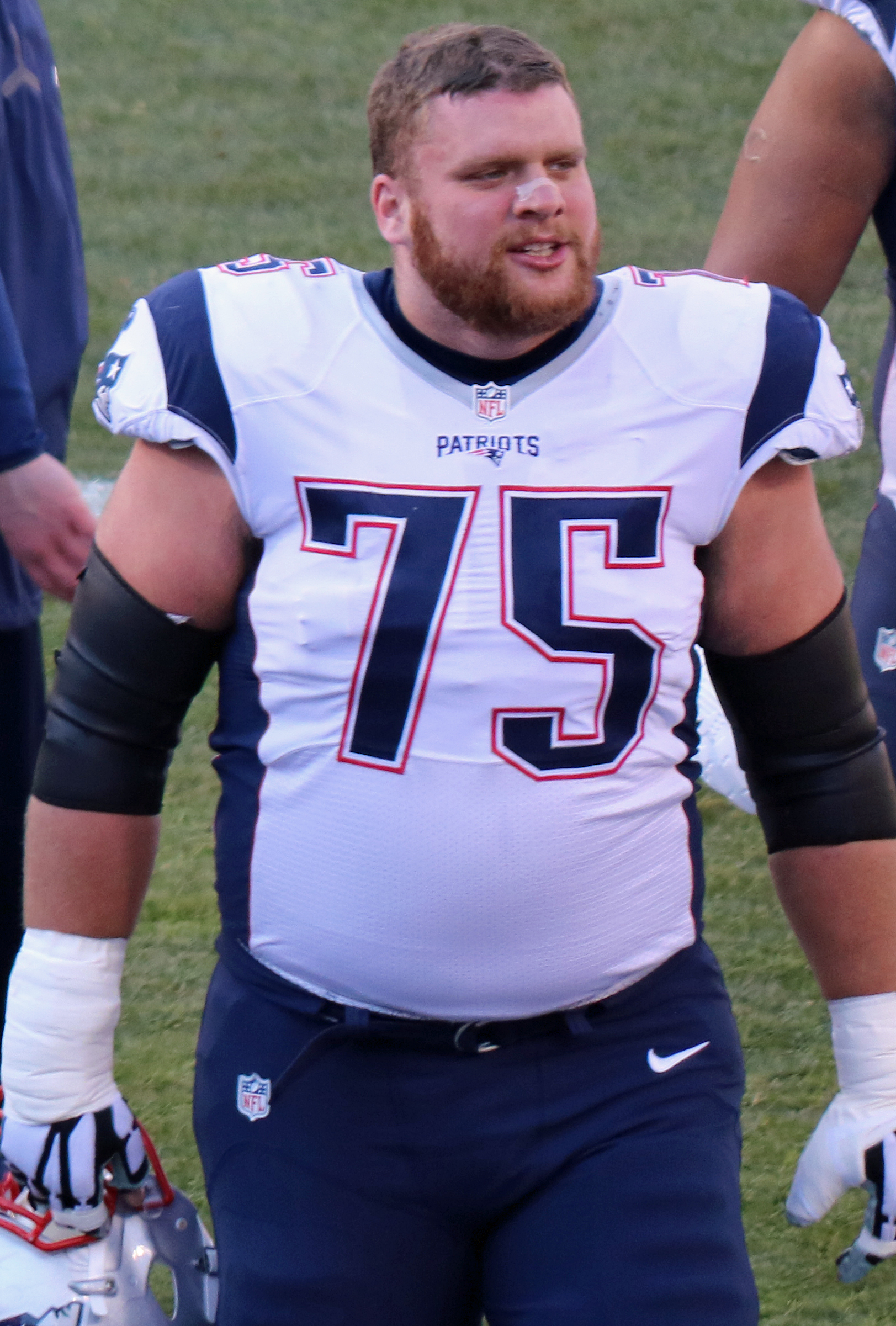
Karras with the Patriots in 2016

Karras was selected by the New England Patriots in the sixth round (221st overall) in the 2016 NFL draft. He made the Patriots 53-man roster and was the starting right guard in the season opener against the Cardinals due to the injuries of Shaq Mason and Jonathan Cooper. He split time with Mason in Week 2 but was reverted to a reserve role for the rest of the season after Mason resumed his starting role in Week 3. Karras contributed to the Patriots finishing with a 14–2 record and earning the top-seed for the AFC playoffs.

On February 5, 2017, Karras was part of the Patriots team that won Super Bowl LI. In the game, the Patriots defeated the Atlanta Falcons by a score of 34–28 in overtime.

On September 2, 2017, Karras was released by the Patriots and was signed to the practice squad the next day. He was promoted to the active roster on September 7, 2017. He made his first start of the season in Week 11 at center, filling in for starter David Andrews, who was out with an illness. Karras and the Patriots reached Super Bowl LII, but were defeated by the Philadelphia Eagles by a score of 41–33.

Karras entered 2018 as a backup guard and center. He started two games at right guard in place of an injured Shaq Mason. The Patriots reached Super Bowl LIII where they defeated the Los Angeles Rams 13–3. He played four special teams snaps in the win.

Karras began the 2019 season as the Patriots' starting center after David Andrews was placed on season-ending injured reserve. He appeared in and started 15 regular season games in the 2019 season.

=== Miami Dolphins ===
On March 20, 2020, Karras signed a one-year contract with the Miami Dolphins. He started all 16 games at center for the Dolphins in 2020.

=== New England Patriots (second stint) ===
On March 19, 2021, Karras signed a one-year contract with the Patriots. After being named a backup guard to begin the season, he was named the starting left guard in Week 7 following a poor performance from Michael Onwenu and started the remainder of the season.

=== Cincinnati Bengals ===
On March 18, 2022, Karras signed a three-year, $18 million contract with the Cincinnati Bengals. Karras was the starting center for the team during the 2022 season, and was named a captain. He started all of the Bengals' games in the 2022 season. He would reprise both roles for the 2023 season. He started in all 17 games in the 2023 season.

On June 13, 2024, Karras signed a one-year contract extension through the 2025 season.

On September 5, 2025, Karras signed a one-year contract extension through the 2026 season.

== Personal life ==
Karras is a third-generation NFL player. His grandfather, Ted Karras Sr., and granduncles, Lou Karras and Alex Karras, played in the NFL from the 1950s until Alex retired in 1970. His father, Ted Karras Jr., played during the 1987 season. He is also the seventh family member over three generations to play football in the Big Ten Conference. Ted attended the same school, Saint Matthew Catholic School in Indianapolis, Indiana, (K-8) as Nick Martin of the Houston Texans, Zack Martin of the Dallas Cowboys, and Cap Boso of the Chicago Bears. Karras is a self-proclaimed fan of and trivia expert on The Office TV series.
