= John Klingel =

American football player (born 1963)

No. 97
- Position: Defensive end

Personal information
- Born: December 21, 1963 (age 62); Marion, Ohio, U.S.
- Listed height: 6 ft 3 in (1.91 m)
- Listed weight: 267 lb (121 kg)

Career information
- High school: Cardington (OH) Lincoln
- College: Eastern Kentucky
- NFL draft: 1987: undrafted

Career history
- Philadelphia Eagles (1987–1988)

Career NFL statistics
- Fumble recoveries: 1
- Stats at Pro Football Reference

John P. Klingel (born December 21, 1963) is an American former professional football player who was a defensive end for the Philadelphia Eagles of the National Football League (NFL) from 1987 to 1988. He played college football for the Eastern Kentucky Colonels.

== Personal life ==
Klingel's daughter, Hillary Klingel, is an occupational therapist specializing in hand therapy.
