= Jack Kramer (American football) =

American football player (1922–2004)

No. 43
- Position: Tackle

Personal information
- Born: June 23, 1922; Milwaukee, Wisconsin, U.S.
- Died: August 14, 2004 (aged 82); Oswego, Illinois, U.S.
- Listed height: 6 ft 0 in (1.83 m)
- Listed weight: 220 lb (100 kg)

Career information
- High school: Solomon Juneau (Milwaukee)
- College: Marquette
- NFL draft: 1945: 20th round, 200th overall pick

Career history
- Buffalo Bisons (1946)

Career AAFC statistics
- Games played: 13
- Games started: 2
- Stats at Pro Football Reference

Jack Kramer (born John Francis Kramer; July 26, 1919 in Milwaukee, Wisconsin) was an American professional football player.

== Career ==
Kramer played with the Buffalo Bisons of the All-America Football Conference in 1946. Previously, he had been drafted in the 20th round of the 1945 NFL draft by the Chicago Cardinals.

He played at the college level at Marquette University.
