= George Groves (American football) =

American football player (1921–2011)

No. 36, 37
- Positions: Guard, linebacker

Personal information
- Born: June 10, 1921; Hammond, Indiana, U.S.
- Died: July 23, 2011 (aged 90); Mexico, Missouri, U.S.
- Listed height: 5 ft 11 in (1.80 m)
- Listed weight: 195 lb (88 kg)

Career information
- College: Marquette (1941-1942)
- NFL draft: 1945: 32nd round, 327th overall pick

Career history
- Buffalo Bills (1947); Baltimore Colts (1948)

Career AAFC statistics
- Games played: 9
- Stats at Pro Football Reference

George Groves (June 10, 1921 – July 23, 2011) was an American professional football player who was a guard in the All-America Football Conference (AAFC). He played college football for the Marquette Hilltoppers.

== Biography ==
Groves was born George Noah Groves June 10, 1921, in Hammond, Indiana. He died July 23, 2011, in Mexico, Missouri.

== Career ==
Groves played professionally with the Cleveland Browns, Buffalo Bills and the Baltimore Colts of the All-America Football Conference in 1946 1947 and 1948. Previously, he had been drafted in the 32nd round of the 1945 NFL draft by the Chicago Bears.

He played at the collegiate level at Marquette University.
