= Kurt Kafentzis =

American football player (born 1962)

No. 1
- Position: Defensive back

Personal information
- Born: December 31, 1962 (age 63); Richland, Washington, U.S.
- Listed height: 6 ft 2 in (1.88 m)
- Listed weight: 190 lb (86 kg)

Career information
- High school: Richland (WA) Columbia
- College: Hawaii
- NFL draft: 1985: undrafted

Career history
- Washington Redskins (1985); Houston Oilers (1986–1988)
- Stats at Pro Football Reference

Kurt Michael Kafentzis (born December 31, 1962) is an American former professional football defensive back who played one season with the Houston Oilers of the National Football League (NFL). He played college football at the University of Hawaiʻi at Mānoa. He was also a member of the Washington Redskins.

== Early life ==
Kafentzis attended Columbia High School in Richland, Washington.

== College career ==
Kafentzis played for the Hawaii Rainbow Warriors from 1981 to 1984.

== Professional career ==
Kafentzis was signed by the Washington Redskins in 1985. He was placed on injured reserve by the Redskins on August 20, 1985.

Kafentzis signed with the Houston Oilers on June 24, 1986, and was later released by the team. He was signed by the Oilers on October 7, 1987. He played in two games for the Houston Oilers during the 1987 season. Kafentzis was released by the Oilers on October 27, 1987. He later rejoined the Oilers and spent the 1988 off-season with the team before being released on August 8, 1988.

== Personal life ==
Kafentzis was one of five brothers who played for the Hawaii Rainbow Warriors. His brothers Mark, Kent and Kyle all signed with NFL teams.
