= Al Klug =

American football player (1920–1957)

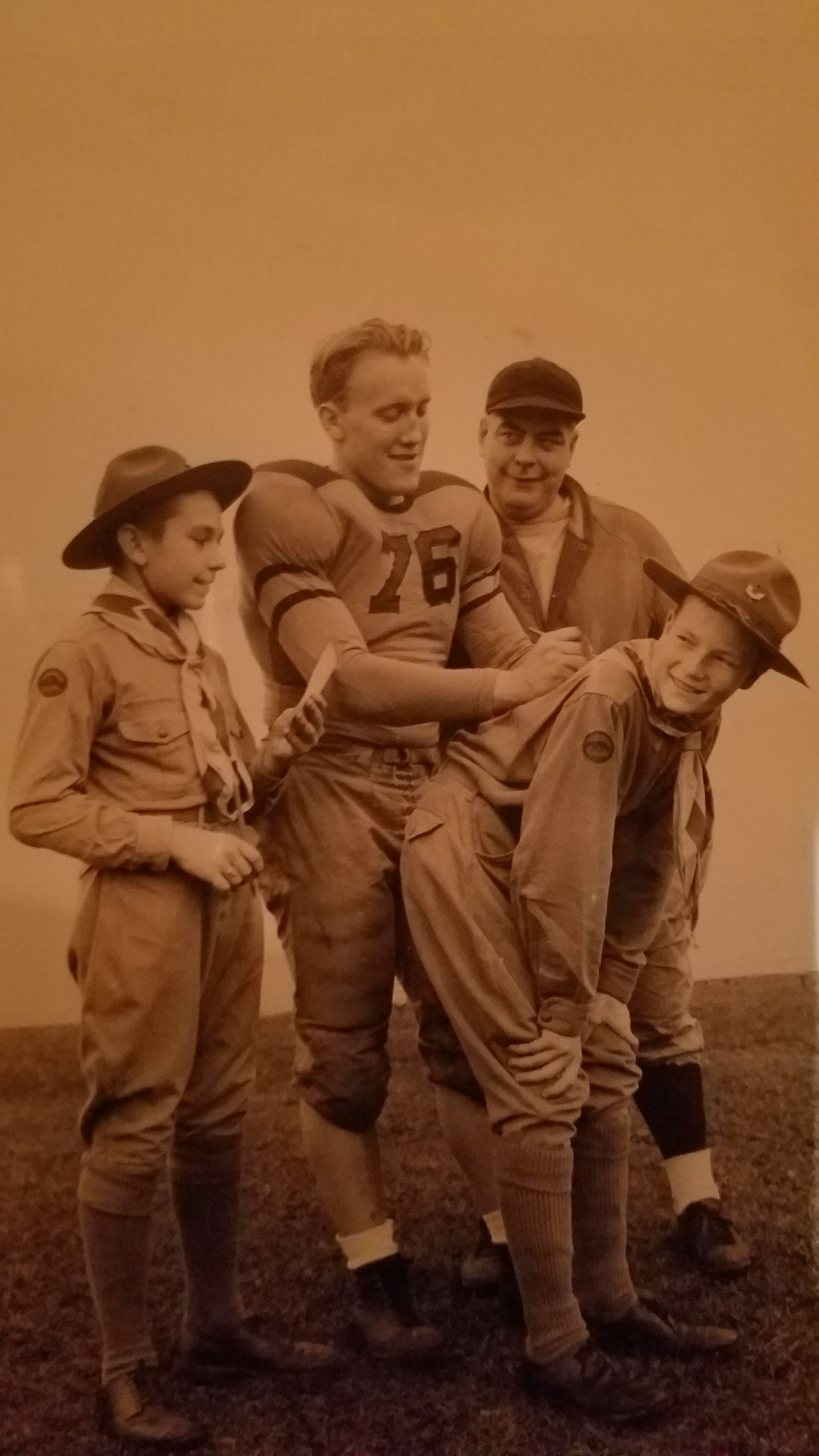
- Al signing autographs for young boy scouts.

No. 36, 41, 38
- Positions: Tackle, guard

Personal information
- Born: June 1, 1920; Milwaukee, Wisconsin, U.S.
- Died: June 14, 1957 (aged 37); Milwaukee, Wisconsin, U.S.
- Listed height: 6 ft 1 in (1.85 m)
- Listed weight: 215 lb (98 kg)

Career information
- High school: Bay View (Milwaukee)
- College: Marquette (1939–1942)
- NFL draft: 1943: 6th round, 44th overall pick

Career history
- Buffalo Bisons (1946); Baltimore Colts (1947–1948)

Career AAFC statistics
- Games played: 36
- Games started: 11
- Stats at Pro Football Reference

Alfred Klug (June 1, 1920 – June 14, 1957) was an American professional football tackle and guard in the All-America Football Conference (AAFC) for the Buffalo Bisons (1946) and the Baltimore Colts (1947–1948). He played college football for the Marquette Golden Eagles.
