= Tom Kerrigan (American football) =

American football player (1906–1979)

Profile
- Position: Guard

Personal information
- Born: July 7, 1906; New York City, U.S
- Died: July 29, 1979 (aged 73); Stamford, Connecticut, U.S.
- Listed height: 6 ft 2 in (1.88 m)
- Listed weight: 200 lb (91 kg)

Career information
- High school: Evander Childs (NY)
- College: Columbia

Career history
- Orange Tornadoes (1929); Newark Tornadoes (1930)

Career NFL statistics
- Games played: 5
- Stats at Pro Football Reference

Thomas Martin Kerrigan (July 7, 1906 – July 29, 1979) was an American professional football player who spent two seasons in the National Football League with the Orange Tornadoes in 1929 and the Newark Tornadoes in 1930, appearing in 5 career games, making two starts.
