= 1944 Big Ten Conference football season =

- Sport: Football
- Number of teams: 9
- Top draft pick: Elroy Hirsch
- Champion: Ohio State
- Season MVP: Les Horvath

Football seasons
- ← 1943 1945 →

1944 Big Ten Conference football standings
	Conf.					Overall
Team	W		L		T	W		L		T
No. 2 Ohio State $	6	–	0	–	0	9	–	0	–	0
No. 8 Michigan	5	–	2	–	0	8	–	2	–	0
Purdue	4	–	2	–	0	5	–	5	–	0
Minnesota	3	–	2	–	1	5	–	3	–	1
Indiana	4	–	3	–	0	7	–	3	–	0
No. 15 Illinois	3	–	3	–	0	5	–	4	–	1
Wisconsin	2	–	4	–	0	3	–	6	–	0
Northwestern	0	–	5	–	1	1	–	7	–	1
Iowa	0	–	6	–	0	1	–	7	–	0
+ – Conference co-champions; Rankings from AP Poll

The 1944 Big Ten Conference football season was the 49th season of college football played by the member schools of the Big Ten Conference (also known as the Western Conference) and was a part of the 1944 college football season.

The 1944 Ohio State Buckeyes football team, under head coach Carroll Widdoes, compiled a perfect 9–0 record, won the Big Ten championship, led the conference in scoring offense (31.9 points per game), and was ranked No. 2 in the final AP Poll. The team was retroactively selected as a national champion by the National Championship Foundation. Quarterback Les Horvath was a consensus first-team pick for the 1944 College Football All-America Team and received the Chicago Tribune Silver Football trophy as the most valuable player in the Big Ten and . End Jack Dugger and center John Tavener were also consensus first-team All-Americans.

Michigan, under head coach Fritz Crisler, compiled an 8–2 record, finished in second place in the conference, and was ranked No. 8 in the final AP Poll. Fullback Don Lund received the team's most valuable player award.

Indiana, under head coach Bo McMillin, compiled a 7–3 record and led the conference in scoring defense (7.9 points per game). Center John Tavener was a consensus first-team All-American and received Indiana's most valuable player award.

== Season overview ==
=== Results and team statistics ===
Conf. Rank	Team	Head coach	AP final	AP high	Overall record	Conf. record	PPG	PAG	MVP
1	Ohio State	Carroll Widdoes	#2	#2	9–0	6–0	31.9	8.8	Les Horvath
2	Michigan	Fritz Crisler	#8	#5	8–2	5–2	20.4	9.1	Don Lund
3	Purdue	Cecil Isbell	NR	#7	5–5	4–2	20.7	16.6	Babe Dimancheff
4	Minnesota	George Hauser	NR	NR	5–3–1	3–2–1	25.0	18.0	John Lundquist
5	Indiana	Bo McMillin	NR	#15	7–3	4–3	29.2	7.9	John Tavener
6	Illinois	Ray Eliot	#15	#9	5–4–1	3–3	27.3	14.9	Buddy Young
7	Wisconsin	Harry Stuhldreher	NR	#19	3–6	2–4	12.4	20.0	Clarence Esser
8	Northwestern	Pappy Waldorf	NR	NR	1–7–1	0–5–1	11.3	17.8	Max Morris
9	Iowa	Slip Madigan	NR	NR	1–7	0–6	6.6	30.0	Bob Snyder

Key
AP final = Team's rank in the final AP Poll of the 1945 season
AP high = Team's highest rank in the AP Poll throughout the 1945 season
PPG = Average of points scored per game
PAG = Average of points allowed per game
MVP = Most valuable player as voted by players on each team as part of the voting process to determine the winner of the Chicago Tribune Silver Football trophy

=== Bowl games ===
During the 1944 season, the Big Ten maintained its long-standing ban on postseason games. Accordingly, no Big Ten teams participated in any bowl games.

== All-Big Ten players ==
The following players were picked by the Associated Press (AP) and/or the United Press (UP) as first-team players on the 1944 All-Big Nine Conference football team.

- Jack Dugger, end, Ohio State (AP, UP)
- Frank Bauman, end, Purdue (AP, UP)
- Milan Lazetich, tackle, Michigan (AP, UP)
- Bill Willis, tackle, Ohio State (AP, UP)
- Bill Hackett, guard, Ohio State (AP, UP)
- Ralph Serpico, guard, Illinois (AP, UP)
- John Tavener, center, Indiana (AP, UP)
- Les Horvath, halfback/quarterback, Ohio State (AP, UP)
- Joe Ponsetto, quarterback, Michigan (AP)
- Buddy Young, halfback, Illinois (AP, UP)
- Babe Dimancheff, fullback/halfback, Purdue (AP, UP)
- Bob Wiese, fullback, Michigan (UP)

== All-Americans ==
At the end of the 1944 season, Big Ten players secured four of the consensus first-team picks for the 1944 College Football All-America Team. The Big Ten's consensus All-Americans were:

- Jack Dugger, end, Ohio State (FWAA, INS, SN, UP, WC)
- Bill Hackett, guard, Ohio State (AAB, AP, COL, FN, FWAA, CP, WC)
- John Tavener, center, Indiana (UP, FWAA, INS, LK, CP)
- Les Horvath, quarterback, Ohio State (AAB, AP, COL, FN, FWAA, INS, LK, NEA, SN, UP, CP, WC)

Other Big Ten players who were named first-team All-Americans by at least one selector were:

- Bill Willis, tackle, Ohio State (LK, SN, UP)
- Ralph Serpico, guard, Illinois (SN)
- Buddy Young, quarterback, Illinois (LK)
- Jug Girard, halfback, Wisconsin (LK)
- Babe Dimancheff, fullback, Purdue (INS, CP)

== 1945 NFL draft ==
The following Big Ten players were selected in the first 10 rounds of the 1945 NFL draft:

Name	Position	Team	Round	Overall pick
Elroy Hirsch	Wide receiver	Michigan	1	5
Don Lund	Back	Michigan	1	7
Jack Dugger	End	Ohio State	2	12
Wayne Williams	Back	Minnesota	2	13
Milan Lazetich	Tackle	Michigan	2	16
Stan Mohrbacher	Guard	Iowa	3	24
Gordon Appleby	Center	Ohio State	3	26
Bob Wiese	Back	Michigan	5	39
Forest Masterson	Center	Iowa	5	40
Pete Pihos	Wide receiver	Indiana	5	41
Dick Barwegen	Guard	Purdue	6	44
Gene Fekete	Back	Ohio State	6	49
Chuck Dellago	Guard	Minnesota	6	52
Fred Negus	Center	Wisconsin	7	59
Jack Mead	End	Wisconsin	7	64
Pat O'Brien	Tackle	Purdue	8	73
Nick Vodick	Back	Northwestern	8	75
Les Joop	Tackle	Illinois	9	82
