= 1944 Michigan Wolverines football team =

American college football season

1944 Michigan Wolverines football
- Conference: Big Ten Conference

Ranking
- AP: No. 8
- Record: 8–2 (5–2 Big Ten)
- Head coach: Fritz Crisler (7th season)
- Offensive scheme: Single-wing
- MVP: Don Lund
- Captains: Bob Wiese (until November 1); Don Lund (after November 1); Joseph Ponsetto (after November 1)
- Home stadium: Michigan Stadium

1944 Big Ten Conference football standings
	Conf.					Overall
Team	W		L		T	W		L		T
No. 2 Ohio State $	6	–	0	–	0	9	–	0	–	0
No. 8 Michigan	5	–	2	–	0	8	–	2	–	0
Purdue	4	–	2	–	0	5	–	5	–	0
Minnesota	3	–	2	–	1	5	–	3	–	1
Indiana	4	–	3	–	0	7	–	3	–	0
No. 15 Illinois	3	–	3	–	0	5	–	4	–	1
Wisconsin	2	–	4	–	0	3	–	6	–	0
Northwestern	0	–	5	–	1	1	–	7	–	1
Iowa	0	–	6	–	0	1	–	7	–	0
+ – Conference co-champions; Rankings from AP Poll

The 1944 Michigan Wolverines football team represented the University of Michigan in the 1944 Big Ten Conference football season. Under seventh-year head coach Fritz Crisler, Michigan compiled a record of 8–2 (5–2 Big Ten Conference), outscored opponents 204 to 91, finished in second place in the Big Ten Conference, and was ranked #8 in the final AP Poll. The team opened the season with a victory over an Iowa-Pre-Flight team that won all of its remaining games and ended the season ranked #6 in the final AP Poll. The Wolverines then shut out four opponents: Marquette (14-0); Northwestern (27-0); Illinois (14-0); and Wisconsin (14-0). The team's two losses came against Indiana and an undefeated Ohio State team that was ranked #2 in the final AP Poll.

Michigan's left tackle Milan Lazetich was selected by both the Associated Press (AP) and United Press (UP) as a first-team player on the All-Big Ten Conference team and was also selected by multiple selectors as a second-team player on the 1944 College Football All-America Team. Two other players on the 1944 Michigan team were selected as first-team All-Big Ten players: quarterback Joe Ponsetto (AP) and fullback Bob Wiese (UP). Wiese also served as the team's captain, and fullback Don Lund received the team's Most Valuable Player award.

== Schedule ==
Date	Opponent	Rank	Site	Result	Attendance	Source
September 16	Iowa Pre-Flight*		Michigan Stadium; Ann Arbor, MI	W 12–7	20,243	
September 23	at Marquette*		Marquette Stadium; Milwaukee, WI	W 14–0	18,000	
September 30	Indiana		Michigan Stadium; Ann Arbor, MI	L 0–20	18,477	
October 7	at Minnesota		Memorial Stadium; Minneapolis, MN (Little Brown Jug)	W 28–13	37,256	
October 14	Northwestern	No. 12	Michigan Stadium; Ann Arbor, MI (rivalry)	W 27–0	30,861	
October 28	No. 10 Purdue		Michigan Stadium; Ann Arbor, MI	W 40–14	44,276	
November 4	at Penn*	No. 10	Franklin Field; Philadelphia, PA	W 41–19	39,557	
November 11	No. 10 Illinois^{†}	No. 8	Michigan Stadium; Ann Arbor, MI (rivalry)	W 14–0	43,922	
November 18	Wisconsin	No. 5	Michigan Stadium; Ann Arbor, MI	W 14–0	20,885	
November 25	at No. 3 Ohio State	No. 6	Ohio Stadium; Columbus, OH (rivalry)	L 14–18	71,958	
*Non-conference game; ^{†}Homecoming; Rankings from AP Poll released prior to the game

== Rankings ==
Ranking movements Legend: ██ Increase in ranking ██ Decrease in ranking — = Not ranked т = Tied with team above or below
	Week								
Poll	1	2	3	4	5	6	7	8	Final
AP	12	15т	—	10	8	5	6	8	8

== Season summary ==
=== Pre-season ===
At the end of August 1944, Michigan opened its pre-season practice with 50 candidates in attendance. While Michigan's Big Ten co-championship team of 1943 had returned 24 veteran lettermen, only eight of the 50 candidates in 1944 were returning lettermen. The vast majority of the candidates (32 of 50) were part of the university's military training programs (including the V-12 Navy College Training Program).

On the line, Michigan lost All-American tackle Merv Pregulman to military service as well as All-Big Ten center Fred Negus. The team returned only three veteran linemen: Art Renner, a starter at right end in 1943; tackle Clem Bauman, a non-starter in 1943; and center Harold Watts, a non-starter in 1943. Michigan's line coach Biggie Munn's other candidates for the line in 1944 included: Milan Lazetich, a tackle from Montana; Quentin Sickels, a 17-year-old freshman guard from Benton Harbor, Michigan; George Burg, a guard from Illinois; Bruce Hilkene, an end from Indiana; George Lintol, a center from Detroit; and Dick Rifenburg, a freshman end from Saginaw, Michigan.

In the backfield, Michigan lost starters Elroy Hirsch, Bill Daley, and Paul White. The team returned five lettermen to the backfield, including fullback Bob Wiese, who started all nine games in 1943 and was chosen as captain of the 1944 team, fullback Don Lund, who started one game in 1943, and quarterback Joe Ponsetto, a non-starter in 1943. Michigan backfield coach Earl Martineau's other candidates for the back positions included: Gene Derricotte, a halfback from Ohio; and Bob Nussbaumer, a halfback from Illinois.

After a problem-filled practice drill on September 13, 1944, three days before the opening game, head coach Fritz Crisler noted that he did not harbor any illusions about his 1944 squad and added: "I'm hoping for the best, fearing the worst and expecting almost anything."

=== Week 1: Iowa Pre-Flight ===
Week 1: Iowa Pre-Flight at Michigan

Team	1	2	3	4	Total
Iowa-Pre-Flight	0	0	7	0	7
• Michigan	0	6	0	6	12

- Date: September 16, 1944
- Location: Michigan Stadium
  Ann Arbor, MI
- Game attendance: 23,400
- Referee: Mike Layden (Notre Dame)

On September 16, 1944, Michigan defeated Iowa-Pre-Flight by a 12 to 7 score. The Iowa Pre-Flight team won all of its remaining games and ended the season ranked #6 in the final AP Poll.

Michigan scored two touchdowns, both coming on passes from Bill Culligan to freshman end, Dick Rifenburg, one gaining 48 yards and the other gaining 58 yards. The United Press described Rifenburg as a "gangling freshman end" who "twice outreached and outran desperate Iowa Pre-Flight Seahawk defenders. Joe Ponsetto missed both kicks for points after touchdown. Fullback Bob Wiese was Michigan's leading rusher in the game with 24 carries for 86 yards. The Wolverines compiled 151 rushing yards and 135 passing yards in the game, exceeding the Seahawks' totals of 99 rushing yards and 22 passing yards. In a "surprise maneuver" that foreshadowed head coach Fritz Crisler's pioneering efforts at using certain players solely on defense or offense, Don Lund was substituted for Michigan's center when the team switched to defense; the Chicago Tribune praised Lund, who intercepted to passes, for his "defensive brilliance" in the game.

Michigan's starting lineup against Iowa Pre-Flight was Bruce Hilkene (left end), Arthur Leroux (left tackle), Quentin Sickels (left guard), Harold Watts (center), George Burg (right guard), Clem Bauman (right tackle), Art Renner (right end), Ponsetto (quarterback), Gene Derricotte (left halfback), Bob Nussbaumer (right halfback), and Wiese (fullback).

=== Week 2: at Marquette ===
Week 2: Marquette at Michigan

Team	1	2	3	4	Total
• Michigan	0	0	7	7	14
Marquette	0	0	0	0	0

- Date: September 23, 1944
- Location: Marquette Stadium, Milwaukee, WI
- Game attendance: 18,000
- Referee: Rollie Barnum (Wisconsin)

On September 23, 1944, Michigan defeated Marquette by a 14 to 0 score at Marquette Stadium in Milwaukee, Wisconsin. The game was the first meeting between Michigan and Marquette since 1909 and the first night game played in the history of the Michigan football program. Michigan scored two touchdowns, one on a six-yard run by halfback Gene Derricotte and the other on a pass from Bill Culligan to end Dick Rifenburg covering 30 yards. Joe Ponsetto kicked both points after touchdown for Michigan. The Wolverines fumbled eight times in the game and did not score in the first half, but they out-gained the Marquette Hilltoppers 230 rushing yards to 68.

After making three touchdown passes in the first two games of the season, freshman Dick Rifenburg withdrew from the football team, having enlisted in the merchant marine.

Michigan's starting lineup against Marquette was Art Renner (left end), Milan Lazetich (left tackle), George Burg (left guard), John Lintol (center), Quentin Sickels (right guard), Clem Bauman (right tackle), Rifenburg (right end), Ponsetto (quarterback), Derricotte (left halfback), Bob Nussbaumer (right halfback), and Bob Wiese (fullback).

=== Week 3: Indiana ===
Week 3: Indiana at Michigan

Team	1	2	3	4	Total
• Indiana	0	6	7	7	20
Michigan	0	0	0	0	0

- Date: September 30, 1944
- Location: Michigan Stadium
  Ann Arbor, MI
- Game attendance: 20,500
- Referee: Lyle Clarno (Bradley)

On September 30, 1944, Michigan lost to Indiana by a 20 to 0 score at Michigan Stadium. The outcome was the first loss by Michigan to a conference opponent since the 1942 season and only the third victory by Indiana over Michigan since 1900. Indiana halfbacks Robert Hoernschemeyer and Abe Addams and quarterback John Cannady led an attack that accounted for 197 rushing yards and 168 passing yards.

Michigan's starting lineup against Indiana was Bruce Hilkene (left end), Milan Lazetich (left tackle), George Burg (left guard), Harold Watts (center), Quentin Sickels (right guard), Clem Bauman (right tackle), Art Renner (right end), Joe Ponsetto (quarterback), Gene Derricotte (left halfback), Bob Nussbaumer (right halfback), and Bob Wiese (fullback).

=== Week 4: at Minnesota ===
Week 4: Michigan at Minnesota

Team	1	2	3	4	Total
• Michigan	0	7	7	14	28
Minnesota	0	0	6	7	13

- Date: October 7, 1944
- Location: Memorial Stadium, Minneapolis, MN
- Game attendance: 40,052
- Referee: William A. Blake (Loras)

On October 7, 1944, Michigan defeated Minnesota by a 28 to 13 score at Memorial Stadium in Minneapolis. The outcome was the first victory by a Michigan team playing on the road against Minnesota since 1932. Michigan fullback Bob Wiese scored three touchdowns. Bill Culligan scored Michigan's first touchdown, and Joe Ponsetto kicked all four points after touchdown. In the first quarter, Michigan stopped two Minnesota drives inside the Michigan 10-yard line. Michigan gained all of its yards from scrimmage on the ground, attempting only one pass, and finishing the game with 265 net rushing yards. Minnesota gained 119 yards rushing and 81 passing yards.

Michigan's starting lineup against Indiana was Bruce Hilkene (left end), Milan Lazetich (left tackle), George Burg (left guard), John Lintol (center), Quentin Sickels (right guard), Clem Bauman (right tackle), Art Renner (right end), Ponsetto (quarterback), Gene Derricotte (left halfback), Bob Nussbaumer (right halfback), and Wiese (fullback).

=== Week 5: Northwestern ===
Week 5: Northwestern at Michigan

Team	1	2	3	4	Total
Northwestern	0	0	0	0	0
• Michigan	13	7	0	7	27

- Date: October 14, 1944
- Location: Michigan Stadium
  Ann Arbor, MI
- Referee: Wm. A. Blake (Loras)

On October 14, 1944, Michigan defeated Northwestern by a 27 to 0 score at Michigan Stadium. Halfback Bob Nussbaumer scored two touchdowns (26-yard run on a lateral from Gene Derricotte in the first quarter and a 25-yard end run in the third quarter), and Michigan's other touchdowns were scored by Bob Wiese (six-yard run) and Derricotte (15-yard run in the first quarter). Joe Ponsetto kicked three of four points after touchdown. Michigan out-gained Northwestern in rushing by 450 yards to 24.

Michigan's starting lineup against Indiana was Bruce Hilkene (left end), Milan Lazetich (left tackle), George Burg (left guard), Harold Watts (center), Quentin Sickels (right guard), Clem Bauman (right tackle), Art Renner (right end), Ponsetto (quarterback), Derricotte (left halfback), Nussbaumer (right halfback), and Wiese (fullback).

=== Week 6: Purdue ===
Week 6: Purdue at Michigan

Team	1	2	3	4	Total
Purdue	0	7	7	0	14
• Michigan	6	14	6	14	40

- Date: October 28, 1944
- Location: Michigan Stadium
  Ann Arbor, MI
- Game attendance: 50,189
- Referee: E. C. Krieger (Ohio St.)

On October 28, 1944, Michigan defeated Purdue by a 40 to 14 score at Michigan Stadium. Fullback Bob Wiese scored three touchdowns, halfback Bob Nussbaumer scored two, and halfback Gene Derricotte scored one. Joe Ponsetto kicked four points after touchdown. Michigan out-gained Purdue on the ground by 354 rushing yards to 139.

After the Purdue game, Michigan lost its two leading scorers, Bob Wiese and Bob Nussbaumer, both of whom were military trainees, to wartime transfer orders. Both missed the remainder of Michigan's football season. Wiese selected Don Lund and Joe Ponsetto to take over his responsibilities as team captain, though coach Crisler stated that Wiese would continue to be recognized as captain despite his absence. Lund was also tasked with filling in for Wiese at the fullback position, while Ralph Chubb was tasked with filling in for Nussbaumer.

Michigan's starting lineup against Indiana was Bruce Hilkene (left end), Milan Lazetich (left tackle), George Burg (left guard), John Lintol (center), Quentin Sickels (right guard), Clem Bauman (right tackle), Art Renner (right end), Ponsetto (quarterback), Derricotte (left halfback), Nussbaumer (right halfback), and Wiese (fullback).

=== Week 7: at Penn ===
Week 7: Michigan at Penn

Team	1	2	3	4	Total
• Michigan	7	27	0	7	41
Penn	0	0	6	13	19

- Date: November 4, 1944
- Location: Franklin Field, Philadelphia, PA
- Game attendance: 48,000
- Referee: Wm. T. Halloran (Providence)

On November 4, 1944, Michigan defeated Penn by 41 to 19 score at Franklin Field in Philadelphia. Michigan's seven touchdowns were scored by halfback Ralph Chubb (2), Gene Derricotte, Art Renner, Bruce Hilkene, and Jack Weisenburger. Joe Ponsetto kicked five points after touchdown. The Wolverines gained 376 rushing yards and 89 passing yards, while holding Penn to 161 rushing yards and 136 passing yards.

Michigan's starting lineup against Indiana was Bruce Hilkene (left end), Milan Lazetich (left tackle), George Burg (left guard), Harold Watts (center), Quentin Sickels (right guard), Clem Bauman (right tackle), Art Renner (right end), Ponsetto (quarterback), Gene Derricotte (left halfback), Ralph Chubb (right halfback), and Don Lund (fullback).

=== Week 8: Illinois ===
Week 8: Illinois at Michigan

Team	1	2	3	4	Total
Illinois	0	0	0	0	0
• Michigan	7	0	0	7	14

- Date: November 11, 1944
- Location: Michigan Stadium
  Ann Arbor, MI
- Game attendance: 42,200
- Referee: Dr. R. W. Huegel (Marquette)

On November 11, 1944, Michigan defeated Illinois by a 14 to 0 score at Michigan Stadium. Michigan's touchdowns were scored by Don Lund (four-yard run in the first quarter) and Jack Weisenburger (two-yard run in the fourth quarter after Harold Watts recovered a fumbled punt at the Illinois 31-yard line), and Joe Ponsetto kicked both points after touchdown. Michigan held Illinois' back Claude "Buddy" Young, the NCAA sprint champion, to 81 yards. Illinois threatened in the first quarter but fumbled at Michigan's one-yard line. Michigan gained 231 yards to 159 for Illinois, with Michigan's yardage divided among multiple backs, including Gene Derricotte (67 yards), Lund (56 yards), Ralph Chubb (53 yards), and Weisenburger (37 yards). Neither team completed a pass.

Michigan's starting lineup against Indiana was Bruce Hilkene (left end), Milan Lazetich (left tackle), George Burg (left guard), Harold Watts (center), Quentin Sickels (right guard), Clem Bauman (right tackle), Art Renner (right end), Ponsetto (quarterback), Derricotte (left halfback), Chubb (right halfback), and Lund (fullback).

=== Week 9: Wisconsin ===
Week 9: Wisconsin at Michigan

Team	1	2	3	4	Total
Wisconsin	0	0	0	0	0
• Michigan	7	0	0	7	14

- Date: November 18, 1944
- Location: Michigan Stadium
  Ann Arbor, MI
- Referee: Lyle Clarno (Bradley)

On November 18, 1944, Michigan defeated Wisconsin by a 14 to 0 score at Michigan Stadium. Michigan's touchdowns were scored by Bill Culligan (84-yard run on a lateral pass from Joe Ponsetto on the first play from scrimmage) and Don Lund (56-yard run on a "spinner play" in the fourth quarter), and points after touchdown were kicked by Ponsetto and Ralph Chubb. Despite the 14 to score, the ground game was close with Michigan gaining 188 rushing yards to 184 for Wisconsin.

Michigan's starting lineup against Wisconsin was Bruce Hilkene (left end), Milan Lazetich (left tackle), George Burg (left guard), Harold Watts (center), Quentin Sickels (right guard), Clem Bauman (right tackle), Art Renner (right end), Ponsetto (quarterback), Bill Culligan (left halfback), Chubb (right halfback), and Lund (fullback).

=== Week 10: Ohio State ===
Week 10: Michigan at Ohio State

Team	1	2	3	4	Total
Michigan	0	7	0	7	14
• Ohio State	6	0	6	6	18

- Date: November 25, 1944
- Location: Ohio Stadium, Columbus, OH
- Game attendance: 71,958
- Referee: W. A. Blake (Loras)

On November 25, 1944, Michigan faced Ohio State at Ohio Stadium in Columbus, Ohio. Michigan came into the game ranked #6 in the AP Poll with undefeated Ohio State ranked #3, and with the Big Ten Conference championship at stake. Ohio State won the game, and with it the conference championship, by an 18 to 14 score. Both of Michigan's touchdowns were scored by Bill Culligan, with both points after touchdown kicked by Joe Ponsetto. Ohio State quarterback and 1944 Heisman Trophy winner Les Horvath scored two touchdowns for the Buckeyes. Michigan led 14-12 in the fourth quarter, but a short 12-yard kickoff by Ralph Chubb gave the ball to the Buckeyes at their 48-yard line. Ohio State drove 52 yards with Horvath running for the winning touchdown with three minutes and 16 seconds remaining. Michigan's performance in the second half was handicapped by the loss of halfback Gene Derricotte to injury and by "a stomach disorder" that struck several Wolverines the night before the game.

Michigan's starting lineup against Ohio State was Bruce Hilkene (left end), Clem Bauman (left tackle), George Burg (left guard), Harold Watts (center), Quentin Sickels (right guard), Milan Lazetich (right tackle), Art Renner (right end), Ponsetto (quarterback), Gene Derricotte (left halfback), Ralph Chubb (right halfback), and Don Lund (fullback).

=== Scoring summary ===
Player	Touchdowns	Extra points	Field goals	Points
Bob Wiese	7	0	0	42
Gene Derricotte	4	0	0	24
Bob Nussbaumer	4	0	0	24
Bill Culligan	4	0	0	24
Joe Ponsetto	0	23	0	23
Dick Rifenburg	3	0	0	18
Ralph Chubb	2	1	0	13
Don Lund	2	0	0	12
Jack Weisenburger	2	0	0	12
Bruce Hilkene	1	0	0	6
Art Renner	1	0	0	6
Totals	30	24	0	204

=== Post-season ===
The final AP Poll was released by the Associated Press (AP) in early December 1944. The undefeated Army Cadets team was selected as the national champion with 1,165 points and having been selected as the #1 team on 95 of the 121 ballots cast. The undefeated 1944 Ohio State Buckeyes football team, which narrowly defeated Michigan, was ranked #2 with 941 points. Iowa Pre-Flight, the team Michigan defeated in the season opener, was ranked #6 with 451 points, and Michigan was ranked #8 with 368 points.

No player on the 1944 Michigan team received first-team honors on the 1944 College Football All-America Team. However, Michigan tackle Milan Lazetich received second-team honors from the AP, Football Writers Association of America (FWAA), International News Service (INS), and Central Press Association (CP). Lazetich was also selected by both the AP and United Press (UP) as a first-team tackle on the 1944 All-Big Nine Conference football team. Lazetich was selected with the 16th overall pick in the 1945 NFL draft and went on to pay six years in the National Football League.

Two other players from the 1944 Michigan team were selected as first-team All-Big Ten players: quarterback Joe Ponsetto (AP) and fullback Bob Wiese (UP). Wiese was also the team's leading scorer with 42 points on seven touchdowns. Don Lund, who began the season as a defensive substitute and replaced Wiese at fullback in the final four games, was selected by his teammates as the team's Most Valuable Player. In the same post-season voting, members of the 1944 Michigan team selected Bruce Hilkene to serve as captain of the 1945 Michigan Wolverines football team.

== Players ==
=== Varsity letter winners ===
The following 30 players received varsity letters for their participation on the 1944 Michigan football team. For players who were starters, the list also includes the number of games started by position. Players who started at least half of the team's games are designated in bold.

- James J. Aliber, quarterback, Detroit, Michigan
- **Clement "Clem" L. Bauman**, tackle, Dayton, Ohio - started 10 games at right tackle
- Warren W. Bentz, halfback, Washington, D.C.
- Gerald E. Brielmaier, tackle, Detroit, Michigan
- **George Burg**, guard, Winnetka, Illinois - started 10 games at left guard
- George Chiaverini, guard, Detroit, Michigan
- Ralph L. Chubb, fullback, Ann Arbor, Michigan - started 3 games at right halfback
- William L. Culligan, halfback, Detroit, Michigan - started 1 game at left halfback
- **Gene Derricotte**, halfback, Defiance, Ohio - started 9 games at left halfback
- Cecil Freihofer, end, Indianapolis, Indiana
- Edward Greer, end, Wayzata, Minnesota
- **Bruce Hilkene**, end, Indianapolis, Indiana - started 9 games at left end
- **Milan Lazetich**, tackle, Anaconda, Montana - started 8 games at left tackle
- Arthur N. LeRoux, tackle, Muskegon Heights, Michigan - started 2 games at left tackle
- **John Lintol**, center, Detroit, Michigan - started 5 games at center
- Don Lund, fullback, Detroit, Michigan - started 3 games at fullback
- Howard Mehaffey, guard, Pittsburgh, Pennsylvania
- **Bob Nussbaumer**, running back, Oak Park, Illinois - started 7 games at right halfback
- Thomas R. Peterson, fullback, Racine, Wisconsin
- **Joe Ponsetto**, quarterback, Flint, Michigan - started 10 games at quarterback
- **Art Renner**, end, Sturgis, Michigan - started 9 games at right end, 1 game at left end
- Dick Rifenburg, end, Saginaw, Michigan - started 1 game at right end
- **Quentin Sickels**, guard, Benton Harbor, Michigan - started 10 games at right guard
- Thomas Swift, guard, Kansas City, Missouri
- Charles Wahl, center, Defiance, Ohio
- **Harold Watts**, center, Birmingham, Michigan - started 5 games at center
- Jack Weisenburger, halfback, Muskegon Heights, Michigan - halfback
- John Weyers, guard, Page, North Dakota
- **Bob Wiese**, fullback, Jamestown, North Dakota - started 7 games at fullback
- Howard Yerges, quarterback, Point Pleasant, West Virginia

=== Non-varsity letter winners ===
The following 36 players appeared on the roster of the 1944 Michigan football team but did not receive varsity letters.

- George Abbott, end, Lansing, Michigan
- Dave Adams, quarterback, Shawano, Michigan
- James M. Artley, quarterback, Savannah, Georgia
- George Babe, guard, Sharon Hill, Pennsylvania
- John Babyak, halfback, Campbell, Ohio
- Richard DeMark, halfback, Detroit, Michigan
- Donald Drake, center, Ypsilanti, Michigan
- Maurice Dunne, tackle, Winnetka, Illinois
- Roger Ely, halfback, Montpelier, Ohio
- Don Farrand, end, Los Angeles, California
- Donald Fate, tackle, Bellaire, Michigan
- Henry Fonde, halfback, Knoxville, Tennessee
- Jack Hackstadt, end, Saginaw, Michigan
- Claude Hessee, end, Bellward, Illinois
- Frank Honigsbaum, end, Troy, New York
- George Hutter, quarterback, Fond du Lac, Wisconsin
- Shelden M. Kavieff, end, Detroit, Michigan
- Max Kelly, end, Loda, Illinois
- William Kerr, guard, Melbourne, Florida
- John Lunenschloss, tackle, Madison, Wisconsin
- Robert Mann, guard, New Bern, North Carolina
- Henry L. Mantho, guard, Alliance, Ohio
- Fred Matthei, end, Ann Arbor, Michigan
- Henry Milczuk, tackle, Hamtramck, Michigan
- Frank Nakamura, guard, Ann Arbor, Michigan
- Joseph A. Oeming, guard, Saginaw, Michigan
- Robert Oren, tackle, Evart, Michigan
- Joseph Pullo, tackle, Cleveland, Ohio
- Charles Sampson, end, Wausau, Wisconsin
- Marvin Shebel, guard, Marshall, Michigan
- Richard Smith, guard, LaGrange, Illinois
- Edward Sohacki, guard, Detroit, Michigan
- Don Spink, defensive back, Rochester, New York
- William Wenzlau, halfback, Toledo, Ohio
- D.E. Williamson, tackle, Utica, New York
- Thomas Wright, tackle, Fairfield, Ohio

=== Awards and honors ===
- Captain: Bob Wiese
- All-Conference: Bob Wiese, Milan Lazetich, Joseph Ponsetto
- Most Valuable Player: Don Lund

=== NFL and AAFC drafts ===
The following 12 players from the 1944 Michigan football team were drafted to play in either the National Football League (NFL) or the All-America Football Conference (AAFC):

- Ralph Chubb: Chubb was selected by the Los Angeles Rams with the 143rd pick in the 1947 NFL draft.
- Gene Derricotte: Derricotte was selected by the Cleveland Browns with the eight pick of the AAFC's secret draft held in July 1948, but he was injured during training camp with the Browns at the end of July 1949 while standing along the sidelines playing catch with a teammate.
- Bruce Hilkene: Hilkene was selected by the Pittsburgh Steelers with the 283rd pick in the 1948 NFL draft.
- Milan Lazetich: Lazetich was selected by the Cleveland Rams with the 16th pick in the 1945 NFL draft and played six seasons in the National Football League (NFL) from 1945 to 1950.
- Don Lund: Lund was selected by the Chicago Bears with the seventh pick in the 1945 NFL Draft, but he opted instead to play in Major League Baseball. He played for the Brooklyn Dodgers, St. Louis Browns and Detroit Tigers between 1945 and 1954.
- Bob Nussbaumer: Nussbaumer was selected by the Green Bay Packers with the 21st pick in the 1946 NFL draft and played in the NFL from 1946 to 1951.
- Joe Ponsetto: Ponsetto was selected by the New York Giants with the 194th pick in the 1947 NFL Draft.
- Art Renner: Renner was selected by the Green Bay Packers with the 56th pick in the 1946 NFL Draft.
- Dick Rifenburg: Rifenburg was selected by the New York Yankees with the 24th pick in the 1949 AAFC Draft, and by Philadelphia Eagles with the 132nd pick in the 1948 NFL draft. He played for the Detroit Lions in 1950.
- Quentin Sickels: Sickels was selected by the Detroit Lions with the 147th pick in the 1948 NFL draft.
- Jack Weisenburger: Weisenburger was selected by the Washington Redskins with the 38th pick in the 1948 NFL draft. He was also selected by the New York Yankees with the 64th pick in the 1948 AAFC Draft.
- Bob Wiese: Wiese was selected by the San Francisco 49ers with the 14th pick in the 1947 AAFC Draft, and by the Detroit Lions with the 39th pick in the 1945 NFL Draft. He played for the Lions in 1947 and 1948.

== Coaching staff ==
- Head coach: Fritz Crisler
- Assistant coaches

Backfield coach: Earl Martineau
Line coach: Biggie Munn
Ends coach: Bennie Oosterbaan
Reserves coach: Arthur Valpey
Other assistant coaches: William C. Barclay (former Michigan back, 1936-1938), Ray Fisher (head baseball coach and asst. football coach), and Wally Weber (head wrestling coach and asst. football coach)

- Trainer: Ray Roberts
- Managers: William Hart and Rawland Sylvester
