= 1944 Illinois Fighting Illini football team =

American college football season

1944 Illinois Fighting Illini football
- Conference: Big Ten Conference

Ranking
- AP: No. 15
- Record: 5–4–1 (3–3 Big Ten)
- Head coach: Ray Eliot (3rd season)
- MVP: Buddy Young
- Captain: Game captains
- Home stadium: Memorial Stadium

1944 Big Ten Conference football standings
	Conf.					Overall
Team	W		L		T	W		L		T
No. 2 Ohio State $	6	–	0	–	0	9	–	0	–	0
No. 8 Michigan	5	–	2	–	0	8	–	2	–	0
Purdue	4	–	2	–	0	5	–	5	–	0
Minnesota	3	–	2	–	1	5	–	3	–	1
Indiana	4	–	3	–	0	7	–	3	–	0
No. 15 Illinois	3	–	3	–	0	5	–	4	–	1
Wisconsin	2	–	4	–	0	3	–	6	–	0
Northwestern	0	–	5	–	1	1	–	7	–	1
Iowa	0	–	6	–	0	1	–	7	–	0
+ – Conference co-champions; Rankings from AP Poll

The 1944 Illinois Fighting Illini football team was an American football team that represented the University of Illinois as a member of the Big Ten Conference during the 1944 Big Ten season. In their third year under head coach Ray Eliot, the Fighting Illini compiled a 5–3–1 record (3–3 in conference games), finished in sixth place in the Big Ten, and outscored opponents by a total of 273 to 149. They were ranked No. 15 in the final AP poll and lost three games to teams ranked in the top 10 in the AP poll: No. 9 Notre Dame (13–7); No. 8 Michigan (14–0); and No. 2 Ohio State (26–12).

Halfback Buddy Young was selected as the team's most valuable player. Young and guard Ralph "Babe" Serpico received first-team honors from both the Associated Press (AP) and United Press (UP) on the 1944 All-Big Ten Conference football team.

The team played its home games at Memorial Stadium in Champaign, Illinois.

== Schedule ==
Date	Opponent	Rank	Site	Result	Attendance	Source
September 16	Illinois State Normal*		Memorial Stadium; Champaign, IL	W 79–0	5,386	
September 23	Indiana		Memorial Stadium; Champaign, IL (rivalry)	W 26–18	7,986	
September 30	at Great Lakes Navy*		Ross Field; Great Lakes, IL	T 26–26	25,000	
October 7	Purdue		Memorial Stadium; Champaign, IL (rivalry)	L 19–35	15,210	
October 14	Iowa	No. 14	Memorial Stadium; Champaign, IL	W 40–6	11,498	
October 21	at Pittsburgh*		Pitt Stadium; Pittsburgh, PA	W 39–5	15,000	
October 28	No. 1 Notre Dame*	No. 14	Memorial Stadium; Champaign, IL	L 7–13	65,114	
November 11	at No. 8 Michigan	No. 10	Michigan Stadium; Ann Arbor, MI (rivalry)	L 0–14	43,922	
November 18	vs. No. 4 Ohio State		Cleveland Stadium; Cleveland, OH (Illibuck)	L 12–26	83,627	
November 25	at Northwestern		Dyche Stadium; Evanston, IL (rivalry)	W 25–6	38,000	
*Non-conference game; Rankings from AP Poll released prior to the game

Halfback Buddy Young was selected as the team's most valuable player.

== Rankings ==
Ranking movements Legend: ██ Increase in ranking ██ Decrease in ranking — = Not ranked
	Week								
Poll	1	2	3	4	5	6	7	8	Final
AP	14	—	14	9	10	—	—	—	15
