= 1944 Ohio State Buckeyes football team =

American college football season

1944 Ohio State Buckeyes football
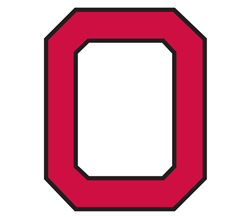

National champion (NCF, SR & Br) Big Ten champion
- Conference: Big Ten Conference

Ranking
- AP: No. 2
- Record: 9–0 (6–0 Big Ten)
- Head coach: Carroll Widdoes (1st season)
- MVP: Les Horvath
- Home stadium: Ohio Stadium

1944 Big Ten Conference football standings
	Conf.					Overall
Team	W		L		T	W		L		T
No. 2 Ohio State $	6	–	0	–	0	9	–	0	–	0
No. 8 Michigan	5	–	2	–	0	8	–	2	–	0
Purdue	4	–	2	–	0	5	–	5	–	0
Minnesota	3	–	2	–	1	5	–	3	–	1
Indiana	4	–	3	–	0	7	–	3	–	0
No. 15 Illinois	3	–	3	–	0	5	–	4	–	1
Wisconsin	2	–	4	–	0	3	–	6	–	0
Northwestern	0	–	5	–	1	1	–	7	–	1
Iowa	0	–	6	–	0	1	–	7	–	0
+ – Conference co-champions; Rankings from AP Poll

The 1944 Ohio State Buckeyes football team represented Ohio State University in the 1944 Big Ten Conference football season. The Buckeyes compiled a 9–0 record. The Buckeyes also outscored opponents 287–79 during the season. The team was named a national champion by the National Championship Foundation and the Sagarin Ratings, but this championship is not claimed by Ohio State.

== Schedule ==
Date	Opponent	Rank	Site	Result	Attendance	Source
September 30	Missouri*		Ohio Stadium; Columbus, OH	W 54–0	29,908	
October 7	Iowa		Ohio Stadium; Columbus, OH	W 34–0	35,358	
October 14	at No. 19 Wisconsin	No. 8	Camp Randall Stadium; Madison, WI	W 20–7	40,000	
October 21	No. 6 Great Lakes Navy*	No. 4	Ohio Stadium; Columbus, OH	W 26–6	73,477	
October 28	Minnesota	No. 4	Ohio Stadium; Columbus, OH	W 34–14	43,563	
November 4	Indiana	No. 3	Ohio Stadium; Columbus, OH	W 21–7	56,380	
November 11	Pittsburgh*	No. 2	Ohio Stadium; Columbus, OH	W 54–19	26,158–26,566	
November 18	vs. Illinois	No. 4	Cleveland Stadium; Cleveland, OH (Illibuck)	W 26–12	83,627	
November 25	No. 6 Michigan	No. 3	Ohio Stadium; Columbus, OH (rivalry)	W 18–14	71,958	
*Non-conference game; Rankings from AP Poll released prior to the game

== Rankings ==
Ranking movements Legend: ██ Increase in ranking ██ Decrease in ranking т = Tied with team above or below ( ) = First-place votes
	Week								
Poll	1	2	3	4	5	6	7	8	Final
AP	8 (2)	4 (4)	4 (14)	3 (17)	2 (18)	4 (3)	3 (5)	3т (18)	2 (5)

== Coaching staff ==
- Carroll Widdoes, head coach, first year

== Awards and honors ==
- Les Horvath, Heisman Trophy

=== First-team All Americans ===
- Jack Dugger, End (All-America Board, FWAA, INS, Sporting News, UP, Walter Camp)
- Bill Hackett, Guard (All-America Board, AP, Collier's, Football News, FWAA, CPA, Walter Camp)
- Les Horvath, Quarterback (All-America Board, AP, Collier's, Football News, FWAA, INS, Look, NEA, Sporting News, UP, CPA, Walter Camp)
- Bill Willis, Tackle (Look, Sporting News, UP)

== 1945 NFL draftees ==
Player	Round	Pick	Position	NFL club
Jack Dugger	2	12	Tackle	Pittsburgh Steelers
Gordon Appleby	3	26	Center	New York Giants
Gene Fekete	6	49	Fullback	Detroit Lions
Bill Hackett	13	131	Guard	Green Bay Packers
Bob Jabbusch	17	174	Guard	New York Giants
Cecil Souders	25	259	End	Washington Redskins
John Priday	31	324	Back	Green Bay Packers
