= Bob Wiese =

American football player (1923–1971)

No. 38, 75
- Positions: Fullback, quarterback

Personal information
- Born: January 25, 1923; Jamestown, North Dakota, U.S.
- Died: November 19, 1971 (aged 48); Lake County, Ohio, U.S.
- Listed height: 6 ft 3 in (1.91 m)
- Listed weight: 198 lb (90 kg)

Career information
- High school: Jamestown
- College: Michigan (1942–1944, 1946)
- NFL draft: 1945: 5th round, 39th overall pick

Career history
- Detroit Lions (1947–1948)

Awards and highlights
- Third-team All-American (1944); 2× First-team All-Big Ten (1943, 1944)

Career NFL statistics
- Rushing yards: 61
- Rushing average: 3.1
- Receptions: 5
- Receiving yards: 53
- Stats at Pro Football Reference

Robert Lee Wiese (January 25, 1923 – November 19, 1971) was an American professional football player. He played college football for Fritz Crisler's University of Michigan Wolverines football teams in 1942, 1943, 1944 and 1946—missing the 1945 season due to military service. He also played professional football for the Detroit Lions in 1947 and 1948.

== Biography ==
Wiese was born in Jamestown, North Dakota, in 1923. He enrolled at the University of Michigan where he joined the football team coached by Fritz Crisler in 1942. In his first year with the team, he started eight games at the fullback position. and was given Meyer Morton Award as the player who showed the greatest development and promise during spring practice.

In 1943, Crisler asked Wiese to assume the quarterback position, and Wiese started five games at the new position as well as three games at his customary fullback position. Wiese was a key player in a Michigan offense that scored 302 points—more points than a Michigan team had scored in 25 years (including the Tom Harmon years). The 1943 Michigan Wolverines football team finished the season with an 8–1 record, outscored its opponents 302 to 73, tied with Purdue for the Big Ten Conference championship, and was ranked No. 3 in the final Associated Press poll. On a team that included stars and Hall of Famers (including Elroy Hirsch and Bill Daley), Wiese was given the award as the team's Most Valuable Player. His teammates also chose him to serve as captain of the 1944 Michigan team.

As captain of the 1944 team, Wiese returned to the fullback position, with Joseph Ponsetto taking over as quarterback. Wiese led the team to a 6–1 record in the first seven games of the season, including victories over Big Ten foes Minnesota (28–13), Northwestern (27–0), and Purdue (40–14). However, Wiese was called into active military service on November 1, 1944, and missed the final three games of the season.

After being discharged from the military, Wiese was granted a fourth year of eligibility and returned to the Michigan football team in 1946. Wiese was the starting fullback in six of Michigan's games in the 1946 season. He completed bachelor's and master's degrees in engineering, was inducted into Tau Beta Pi, and went on to play for the Detroit Lions in the 1947 and 1948 football seasons.

In his later years, Wiese worked as a managing engineer for North American Rockwell Co. (Molded Fiberglass Division) in Ashtabula, Ohio. He married Barbara Ann Piper, a Michigan graduate whom he met for the first time in wartime Philippines, and they had four children. He died in a plane crash in November 1971. Wiese and two other Rockwell executives had chartered a twin-engine plane to take them to Detroit for a company meeting and attend the Michigan/Ohio football game. The plane crashed in a field in Lake County, Ohio, killing the three Rockwell executives and the pilot. The Robert L Wiese scholarship is established in his name in the Athletics Department at the University of Michigan.
