= Bruce Hilkene =

American football player (1925–1990)

Bruce L. Hilkene
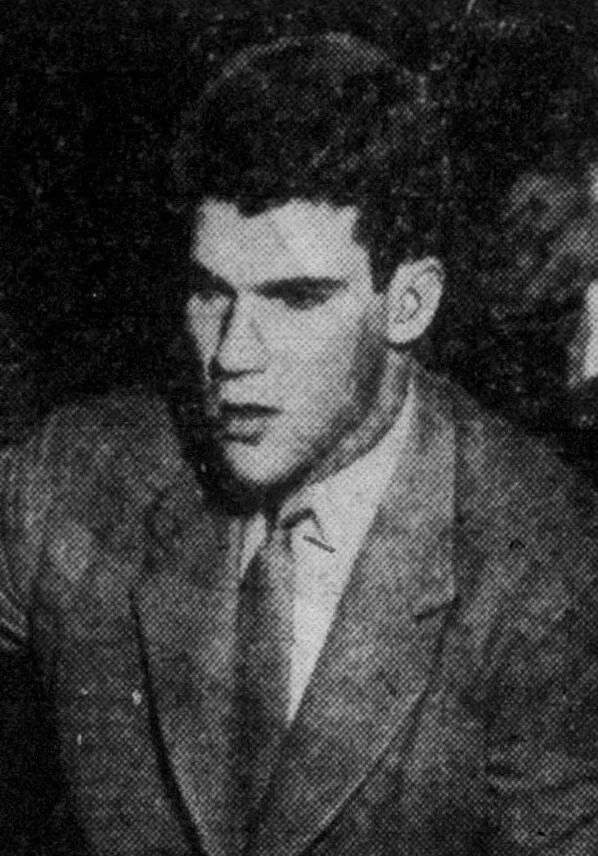
- Hilkene in December 1947
- Born: November 4, 1925
- Died: April 26, 1990 (aged 64)
- Education: University of Michigan

Bruce L. Hilkene (November 4, 1925 – April 26, 1990) was the captain and starting left tackle of the undefeated 1947 Michigan Wolverines football team. The team defeated the USC Trojans 49–0 in the 1948 Rose Bowl and has been selected as the greatest Michigan football team of all time. Hilkene was named captain of the 1945 team but missed the season due to wartime service in the U.S. Navy. In 1947 he returned as captain. Hilkene later served for many years as an executive at General Motors. He was posthumously inducted into the University of Michigan Athletic Hall of Honor in 1992.

== Youth ==
Hilkene was a native of Indianapolis, Indiana, where he attended Shortridge high school.

== College football ==
=== Early seasons ===
He joined the Michigan Wolverines football team as a 17-year-old freshman in September 1943 where he was a reserve player. Hilkene later joked that he was a "retired end" in 1943, "retired to the bench so long he didn't earn a letter."

At the start of the 1944 season, Hilkene competed for the starting lineup at the end position with Art Renner and Dick Rifenberg. Hilkene won the job and was the starting left end in nine of the team's ten games in 1944. The team was 8–2 that year, outscoring opponents 204–91. On his 19th birthday, Hilkene scored his first and only collegiate touchdown on a pass from Howard Yerges in a 41–19 win over the University of Pennsylvania. At the conclusion of the 1944 season, Hilkene was selected by the Big Ten coaches as an Honorable Mention player on the Associated Press All Western Conference Team. In December 1944, Hilkene was also voted by the Michigan players to be the captain of the 1945 football team.

Hilkene also played basketball as a backup center for Michigan in 1944 and 1945.

=== Military service ===
As a sophomore in 1944, Hilkene enlisted in the U.S. Navy and participated in the V-12 Navy College Training Program while continuing his studies in Ann Arbor. In mid-February 1945, Hilkene was transferred from the university for advance military training. At the time of his transfer to active duty, newspapers published a photograph of Coach Fritz Crisler saying farewell to Hilkene with the following caption:

"Losing football players and captains is getting to be an old wartime story for Michigan's grid coach, Fritz Crisler. Crisler here is saying 'so long and best of luck' to Bruce Hilkene, Indianapolis, Ind., football captain elect. Hilkene has been transferred from Michigan to an advanced Navy training base."

Hilkene missed the 1945 season due to his military service.

=== 1946 season ===
Hilkene returned to the Michigan football team for the 1946 season, but was moved to left tackle where Coach Fritz Crisler needed Hilkene's "fast-charging ability for an aggressive offensive line." Hilkene proved to be a "line standout." With the return of numerous players from military service, the 1946 team had five present and former team captains competing for a spot in the lineup: Art Renner, Joe Ponsetto, Bob Wiese, Paul White and Hilkene. Hilkene won a starting spot as left tackle in six of Michigan's nine games in 1946. At the end of the season, Hilkene was named an Honorable Mention at the tackle position on the Associated Press 1946 All-America Team. Having been unable to assume his position as captain of the 1945 team due to military service, Hilkene received the honor again when the Michigan players voted at the end of the 1946 season to name Hilkene, then a 193-pound tackle, as captain of the 1947 team.

=== 1947 season ===
==== Best team in Michigan history ====
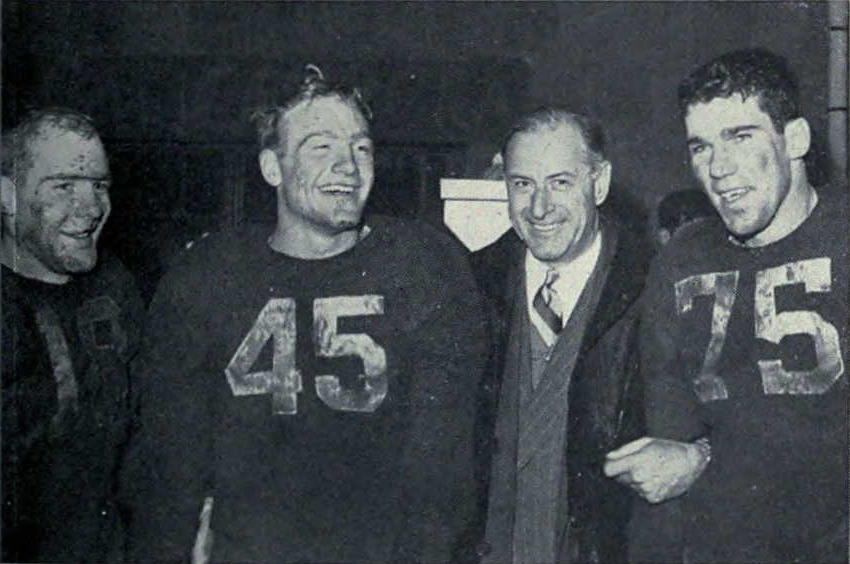
Bump Elliott, Pete Elliott (No. 45), Fritz Crisler and Hilkene (No. 75) celebrate 1947 Big 9 championship after defeating Wisconsin.

The 1947 Michigan football team captained by Hilkene went undefeated in the regular season and went on to defeat USC 49–0 in the 1948 Rose Bowl game. The 1947 team outscored its opponents 394–53 and was selected by the ESPN Big Ten College Football Encyclopedia as the best team in the history of Michigan football. The team had two first-team All-Americans, Bob Chappuis and Bump Elliott, and its performance in the 1948 Rose Bowl still stands as the most points scored, and the largest margin of victory, in Rose Bowl history. The 1947 team is also remembered as the first team fully to embrace the concept of defensive and offensive specialization. Previously, most players had played their positions on both offense and defense. But in 1947, Coach Fritz Crisler established separate offensive and defensive squads. Only Bump Elliott and Jack Weisenberger played on both squads. In November 1947, Time magazine ran a feature article about the 1947 Wolverines (with Bob Chappuis’ photograph on the cover) focused on the new era of specialization marked by Crisler’s decision to field separate offensive and defensive units.”

==== Offensive line play ====
Hilkene played on the offensive unit in Crisler's team of specialists, and seldom played on defense. Hilkene won praise both for his line play and for his leadership on the 1947 squad. He was one of the key blockers for the powerful offense of the 1947 team, and a November 1947 newspaper profile called him the "Michigan Pilot" and "one of the stars of Michigan's famed offensive line is Tackle Bruce Hilkene, a speedy 190-pounder. Bruce played end in 1943–44, winning a letter." An Associated Press cartoonist featured Hilkene in a pre-Rose Bowl cartoon, calling him "the lightest tackle in the Big Nine — and the scrappiest."

Ohio State scout, Esco Sarkkinen, pointed to Hilkene's speed at the tackle position as one of the strengths of the 1947 Michigan team. Sarkkinen noted, "To show the speed of the tackles, Capt. Bruce Hilkene, who operates on the left side, is a converted end."

==== Team leadership as captain ====
Hilkene also played a key leadership role on the 1947 team. After the undefeated regular season concluded, the Long Beach Press-Telegram published a three-column profile of Hilkene under the headline, "Hilkene Unsung Hero of Michigan Eleven." The article noted:

"Captain Bruce Hilkene doesn't consider himself a great tackle, nor does he pretend to be a forceful leader, yet he is the mucillage of the 1947 Michigan football team. Twice elected captain of the Wolverines, Hilkene kept the squad together throughout the season. His mild mannerisms off the field belied his inspirational actions which helped guide one of the greatest Michigan teams ..."

He regularly called unscheduled team meetings on his own initiative to iron out any problems with the team. Teammate Pete Elliott later recalled a team meeting called by Hilkene after the team had a terrible practice. He said, "Our captain that year, Bruce Hilkene, announced that right after our meal, we were going to have a team meeting and straighten things out. Nobody said a word during the meal. We got to the meeting and everybody had long faces on. Hilkene said that if anyone had a problem, now was the time to let it out in the open." Star receiver Dick Rifenburg, stood up, looked at Hilkene and said with a straight face, "I don't think I'm getting enough publicity." According to Elliott, "Everybody just died laughing."

Fritz Crisler called Hilkene "one of the finest captains that we've ever had since I've been here." In June 1948, Hilkene was one of ten Michigan players selected to play in the annual game between the College All-Stars and the Chicago Cardinals.

== Later years ==
Hilkene was the 283rd overall pick in the 1948 NFL draft, being selected by the Pittsburgh Steelers in the 30th round, but did not play professional football.

As of 1961, Hilkene was working as a labor relations executive with a Detroit automotive firm. Hilkene worked for many years as a General Motors Corp. executive.

His son, Mike Hilkene, played football (at the end position) for the Michigan Wolverines in the late 1960s.

In April 1990, Hilkene died of cancer at his home in La Quinta, California. In 1992, he was posthumously inducted into the University of Michigan Athletic Hall of Honor.

In 1997, his wife, Lee, and son Michael (one of Hilkene's three children) attended a 50-year reunion of the 1947 Michigan team. At the time, his wife noted, "Bruce felt that football taught him so much. In a way, it influenced the rest of his life. And it was the same way for the entire team."

== See also ==
- University of Michigan Athletic Hall of Honor
