= 1944 Iowa Hawkeyes football team =

American college football season

1944 Iowa Hawkeyes football
- Conference: Big Ten Conference
- Record: 1–7 (0–6 Big Ten)
- Head coach: Slip Madigan (2nd season)
- MVP: Bob Snyder
- Home stadium: Iowa Stadium

1944 Big Ten Conference football standings
	Conf.					Overall
Team	W		L		T	W		L		T
No. 2 Ohio State $	6	–	0	–	0	9	–	0	–	0
No. 8 Michigan	5	–	2	–	0	8	–	2	–	0
Purdue	4	–	2	–	0	5	–	5	–	0
Minnesota	3	–	2	–	1	5	–	3	–	1
Indiana	4	–	3	–	0	7	–	3	–	0
No. 15 Illinois	3	–	3	–	0	5	–	4	–	1
Wisconsin	2	–	4	–	0	3	–	6	–	0
Northwestern	0	–	5	–	1	1	–	7	–	1
Iowa	0	–	6	–	0	1	–	7	–	0
+ – Conference co-champions; Rankings from AP Poll

The 1944 Iowa Hawkeyes football team was an American football team that represented the University of Iowa as a member of the Big Ten Conference during the 1944 Big Ten football season. In their second and final year under head coach Slip Madigan, the Hawkeyes compiled a 1–7 record (0–6 in conference games), finished in last place in the Big Ten, and were outscored by a total of 240 to 53.

The team played its home games at Iowa Stadium (later renamed Kinnick Stadium) in Iowa City, Iowa.

== Schedule ==
Date	Opponent	Site	Result	Attendance	Source
October 7	at Ohio State	Ohio Stadium; Columbus, OH	L 0–34	35,358	
October 14	at No. 14 Illinois	Memorial Stadium; Champaign, IL	L 6–40		
October 21	No. 11 Purdue^{†}	Iowa Stadium; Iowa City, IA	L 7–26	17,000	
October 28	at No. 17 Indiana	Memorial Stadium; Bloomington, IN	L 0–32		
November 4	Nebraska*	Iowa Stadium; Iowa City, IA (rivalry)	W 27–6		
November 11	at Wisconsin	Camp Randall Stadium; Madison, WI (rivalry)	L 7–26		
November 18	Minnesota	Iowa Stadium; Iowa City, IA (rivalry)	L 0–46	11,200	
November 25	No. 7 Iowa Pre-Flight*	Iowa Stadium; Iowa City, IA	L 6–30	2,500	
*Non-conference game; ^{†}Homecoming; Rankings from AP Poll released prior to the game
