= 1944 Minnesota Golden Gophers football team =

American college football season

1944 Minnesota Golden Gophers football
- Conference: Big Ten Conference
- Record: 5–3–1 (3–2–1 Big Ten)
- Head coach: George Hauser (3rd season)
- MVP: John Lundquist
- Captain: Game captains
- Home stadium: Memorial Stadium

1944 Big Ten Conference football standings
	Conf.					Overall
Team	W		L		T	W		L		T
No. 2 Ohio State $	6	–	0	–	0	9	–	0	–	0
No. 8 Michigan	5	–	2	–	0	8	–	2	–	0
Purdue	4	–	2	–	0	5	–	5	–	0
Minnesota	3	–	2	–	1	5	–	3	–	1
Indiana	4	–	3	–	0	7	–	3	–	0
No. 15 Illinois	3	–	3	–	0	5	–	4	–	1
Wisconsin	2	–	4	–	0	3	–	6	–	0
Northwestern	0	–	5	–	1	1	–	7	–	1
Iowa	0	–	6	–	0	1	–	7	–	0
+ – Conference co-champions; Rankings from AP Poll

The 1944 Minnesota Golden Gophers football team represented the University of Minnesota in the 1944 Big Ten Conference football season. In their third year under head coach George Hauser, the Golden Gophers compiled a 5–3–1 record but were outscored by their opponents by a combined total of 225 to 162.

No players were awarded any major awards, All-American status or All-Big Ten status. Back John Lundquist was awarded the Team MVP Award.

Total attendance for the season was 179,979, which averaged to 29,997. The season high for attendance was against Northwestern.

== Schedule ==
Date	Opponent	Site	Result	Attendance	Source
September 23	Iowa Pre-Flight*	Memorial Stadium; Minneapolis, MN	L 13–19	31,687	
September 30	Nebraska*	Memorial Stadium; Minneapolis, MN (rivalry)	W 39–0	21,876	
October 7	Michigan	Memorial Stadium; Minneapolis, MN (Little Brown Jug)	L 13–28	37,256	
October 14	Missouri*	Memorial Stadium; Minneapolis, MN	W 39–27	24,207	
October 28	at No. 4 Ohio State	Ohio Stadium; Columbus, OH	L 14–34	43,563	
November 4	Northwestern^{†}	Memorial Stadium; Minneapolis, MN	T 14–14	46,482	
November 11	Indiana	Memorial Stadium; Minneapolis, MN	W 19–14	30,254	
November 18	at Iowa	Iowa Stadium; Iowa City, IA (rivalry)	W 46–0	11,200	
November 25	at Wisconsin	Camp Randall Stadium; Madison, WI (rivalry)	W 28–26	30,000	
*Non-conference game; ^{†}Homecoming; Rankings from AP Poll released prior to the game

== Game summaries ==
=== Michigan ===
Week 4: Michigan at Minnesota

Team	1	2	3	4	Total
• Michigan	0	7	7	14	28
Minnesota	0	0	6	7	13

- Date: October 7, 1944
- Location: Memorial Stadium, Minneapolis
- Game attendance: 40,052
- Referee: William A. Blake (Loras)

On October 7, 1944, Minnesota lost to Michigan by a 28 to 13 score at Memorial Stadium in Minneapolis. The outcome was the first victory by a Michigan team playing on the road against Minnesota since 1932. Michigan fullback Bob Wiese scored three touchdowns. Bill Culligan scored Michigan's first touchdown, and Joe Ponsetto kicked all four points after touchdown. In the first quarter, Michigan stopped two Minnesota drives inside the Michigan 10-yard line. Michigan gained all of its yards from scrimmage on the ground, attempting only one pass, and finishing the game with 265 net rushing yards. Minnesota gained 119 yards rushing and 81 passing yards.
