= Art Renner =

American football player (1923–1999)

No. 80
- Position: End

Personal information
- Born: February 14, 1924; Sturgis, Michigan, U.S.
- Died: September 14, 1999 (aged 76); Sturgis, Michigan, U.S.

Career information
- College: Michigan
- NFL draft: 1946: 7th round, 56th overall pick

Awards and highlights
- Second-team All-Big Ten (1944)

Arthur W. Renner (February 14, 1923 – September 14, 1999) was an American football player. He played college football for the University of Michigan from 1942 to 1946. He played on four Michigan teams that were ranked in the top ten in the United States and was the captain of the 1946 Michigan Wolverines football team that was ranked #6 in the United States in the final AP Poll. His college football career was interrupted by service in the United States Marine Corps during World War II.

== Early life ==
Renner was born in southwestern Michigan in 1923. His father, Raymond J. Renner, was a Pennsylvania native who worked for a tea company. His mother, Mina A. Renner, was a Michigan native. At the time of the 1930 United States census, he lived at Three Rivers, Michigan, with his parents and a younger brother, Warren H. Renner.

== University of Michigan ==
Renner enrolled at the University of Michigan in 1942 and played four years of varsity football for the Michigan Wolverines football team under head coach Fritz Crisler. He played at the end position for Michigan's freshman team in 1942 and for the varsity from 1943 to 1946. After the 1943 season, the Michiganensian wrote that Renner stood out like a klieg light at the end position. He started all nine games for the 1944 Michigan team that was ranked #8 in the final AP Poll. After the 1944 season, Renner was inducted into the United States Marine Corps, but he was discharged in the fall of 1945 following the end of World War II. He was again a starter for the 1945 team that was ranked No. 6 in the final AP poll. Playing against the legendary 1945 Army Cadets football team (a team that shut out five opponents, won the national championship, and allowed only four touchdowns during the entire year), Renner scored Michigan's only touchdown on a pass from Walt Teninga. At the end of the 1945 season, Renner was elected by his teammates as the captain of the 1946 Michigan Wolverines football team. The 1946 team captained by Renner finished the season ranked No. 6 in the country in the final AP poll. While attending Michigan, he was also a member of Lambda Chi Alpha fraternity, the Triangles and the Vulcans. He graduated from Michigan in 1947 with a Bachelor of Science degree in mechanical engineering.

== Later life ==
Renner was selected by the Green Bay Packers as the 56th overall pick in the 1946 NFL draft, but he chose a career in engineering over professional football. In his later years, Renner lived in Sturgis, Michigan. He died there in 1999 at age 76.
