= 1944 Indiana Hoosiers football team =

American college football season

1944 Indiana Hoosiers football
- Conference: Big Ten Conference
- Record: 7–3 (4–3 Big Ten)
- Head coach: Bo McMillin (11th season)
- MVP: John Tavener
- Captain: John Tavener
- Home stadium: Memorial Stadium

1944 Big Ten Conference football standings
	Conf.					Overall
Team	W		L		T	W		L		T
No. 2 Ohio State $	6	–	0	–	0	9	–	0	–	0
No. 8 Michigan	5	–	2	–	0	8	–	2	–	0
Purdue	4	–	2	–	0	5	–	5	–	0
Minnesota	3	–	2	–	1	5	–	3	–	1
Indiana	4	–	3	–	0	7	–	3	–	0
No. 15 Illinois	3	–	3	–	0	5	–	4	–	1
Wisconsin	2	–	4	–	0	3	–	6	–	0
Northwestern	0	–	5	–	1	1	–	7	–	1
Iowa	0	–	6	–	0	1	–	7	–	0
+ – Conference co-champions; Rankings from AP Poll

The 1944 Indiana Hoosiers football team represented the Indiana Hoosiers in the 1944 Big Ten Conference football season. The Hoosiers played their home games at Memorial Stadium in Bloomington, Indiana. The team was coached by Bo McMillin, in his 11th year as head coach of the Hoosiers.

== Schedule ==
Date	Opponent	Rank	Site	Result	Attendance
September 16	Fort Knox*		Memorial Stadium; Bloomington, IN	W 72–0	
September 23	at Illinois		Memorial Stadium; Champaign, IL (rivalry)	L 18–26	7,986
September 30	at Michigan		Michigan Stadium; Ann Arbor, MI	W 20–0	20,500
October 14	Nebraska	No. 19	Memorial Stadium; Bloomington, IN	W 54–0	
October 21	at Northwestern	No. 20	Dyche Stadium; Evanston, IL	W 14–7	
October 28	Iowa	No. 17	Memorial Stadium; Bloomington, IN	W 32–0	
November 4	at No. 3 Ohio State	No. 15	Ohio Stadium; Columbus, OH	L 7–21	56,380
November 11	at Minnesota		Memorial Stadium; Minneapolis, MN	L 14–19	30,254
November 18	Pittsburgh*		Memorial Stadium; Bloomington, IN	W 47–0	
November 25	at Purdue		Ross–Ade Stadium; West Lafayette, IN (Old Oaken Bucket)	W 14–6	27,500
*Non-conference game; Rankings from AP Poll released prior to the game

== Rankings ==
Ranking movements Legend: ██ Increase in ranking ██ Decrease in ranking — = Not ranked т = Tied with team above or below
	Week								
Poll	1	2	3	4	5	6	7	8	Final
AP	19т	20	17	15	—	—	—	—	—

== 1945 NFL draftees ==
Player	Position	Round	Pick	NFL club
Pete Pihos	Wide receiver	5	41	Philadelphia Eagles
Bob Cowan	Back	12	111	Chicago Cardinals
John Cannady	Back	16	154	Chicago Cardinals
