= 1944 Wisconsin Badgers football team =

American college football season

1944 Wisconsin Badgers football
- Conference: Big Ten Conference
- Record: 3–6 (2–4 Big Ten)
- Head coach: Harry Stuhldreher (9th season)
- MVP: Clarence Esser
- Captain: Allan Shafer
- Home stadium: Camp Randall Stadium

1944 Big Ten Conference football standings
	Conf.					Overall
Team	W		L		T	W		L		T
No. 2 Ohio State $	6	–	0	–	0	9	–	0	–	0
No. 8 Michigan	5	–	2	–	0	8	–	2	–	0
Purdue	4	–	2	–	0	5	–	5	–	0
Minnesota	3	–	2	–	1	5	–	3	–	1
Indiana	4	–	3	–	0	7	–	3	–	0
No. 15 Illinois	3	–	3	–	0	5	–	4	–	1
Wisconsin	2	–	4	–	0	3	–	6	–	0
Northwestern	0	–	5	–	1	1	–	7	–	1
Iowa	0	–	6	–	0	1	–	7	–	0
+ – Conference co-champions; Rankings from AP Poll

The 1944 Wisconsin Badgers football team was an American football team that represented the University of Wisconsin in the 1944 Big Ten Conference football season. The team compiled a 3–6 record (2–4 against conference opponents) and finished in seventh place in the Big Ten Conference. Harry Stuhldreher was in his ninth year as Wisconsin's head coach. This was the first season since 1905 that the Badgers started the season away from home.

On November 11, 1944, Allan Shafer, a 17-year-old freshman quarterback, died at Wisconsin General Hospital from a hemorrhage to the lung after a hit sustained in the second half of Wisconsin's 26-7 victory over Iowa. His jersey number (No. 83) was retired, and his name appears on the Camp Randall Stadium facade.

Tackle Clarence Esser received the team's most valuable player award. Shafer was the team captain. Jug Girard, a 17-year-old freshman, was selected by Look magazine as a first-team halfback on the 1944 College Football All-America Team.

The team played its home games at Camp Randall Stadium. During the 1944 season, the average attendance at home games was 22,010.

== Schedule ==
Date	Opponent	Rank	Site	Result	Attendance	Source
September 30	at Northwestern		Dyche Stadium; Evanston, IL	W 7–6		
October 7	Marquette*		Camp Randall Stadium; Madison, WI	W 21–2	27,000	
October 14	No. 8 Ohio State^{†}	No. 19	Camp Randall Stadium; Madison, WI	L 7–20	40,000	
October 21	at No. 1 Notre Dame*		Notre Dame Stadium; Notre Dame, IN	L 13–28	36,086	
October 28	No. 16 Great Lakes Navy*		Camp Randall Stadium; Madison, WI	L 12–40	24,000	
November 4	at Purdue		Ross–Ade Stadium; West Lafayette, IN	L 0–35	16,000	
November 11	Iowa		Camp Randall Stadium; Madison, WI (rivalry)	W 26–7		
November 18	at No. 5 Michigan		Michigan Stadium; Ann Arbor, MI	L 0–14	20,885	
November 25	Minnesota		Camp Randall Stadium; Madison, WI (rivalry)	L 26–28	30,000	
*Non-conference game; ^{†}Homecoming; Rankings from AP Poll released prior to the game

== Rankings ==
Ranking movements Legend: ██ Increase in ranking ██ Decrease in ranking — = Not ranked т = Tied with team above or below
	Week								
Poll	1	2	3	4	5	6	7	8	Final
AP	19т	—	—	—	—	—	—	—	—

== See also ==
- List of American football players who died during their career § College
