= Howard Yerges =

American football player (1925–2000)

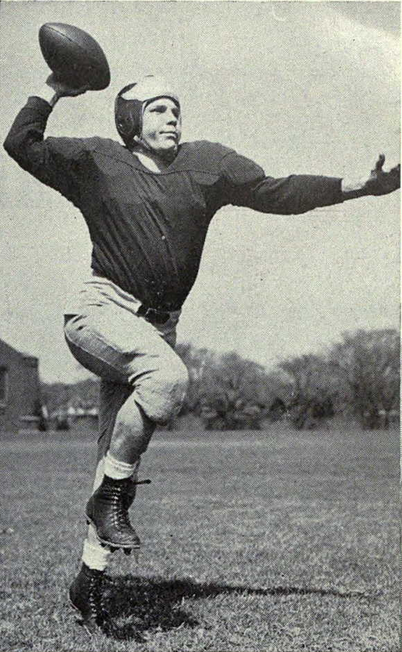
- Yerges from 1948 Michiganensian

Profile
- Position: Quarterback

Personal information
- Born: April 5, 1924; Columbus, Ohio, U.S.
- Died: December 24, 2000 (aged 76); Princess Anne, Maryland, U.S.

Career information
- College: Ohio State (1943); Michigan (1944–1947)

Awards and highlights
- First-team All-Big Nine (1947)

Howard Frederick Yerges Jr. (April 5, 1924 – December 24, 2000) was an American college football player who played quarterback for the Ohio State Buckeyes football team in 1943 and the University of Michigan Wolverines football teams from 1944 to 1947. He was the starting quarterback of the 1947 Michigan Wolverines football team that went undefeated, beat USC 49–0 in the Rose Bowl and is considered by some to be the greatest Michigan football team of all time. As of 2009, Yerges was one of three players (along with Justin Boren and J. T. White) to play on both sides of the Michigan–Ohio State football rivalry.

== Playing career ==
Yerges was a native of Point Pleasant, West Virginia. He played quarterback for Grandview Heights High School in the Grandview Heights section of Columbus, Ohio. His father, Howard Yerges Sr., played for the Ohio State Buckeyes in the 1910s and later played professional football for the Columbus Panhandles in 1920.

Yerges began his collegiate football career at Ohio State University, where he received a varsity letter in football in 1943. As a U.S. Navy trainee, Yerges was transferred to the University of Michigan prior to the 1944 academic year. The 20-year-old sophomore, who had played for the Buckeyes in 1943, joined Fritz Crisler's Michigan Wolverines football team in 1944 as a backup quarterback behind Joseph Ponsetto. Yerges earned a varsity letter in football from Michigan in 1944. Yerges again began the 1945 season as a backup for Joe Ponsetto. He scored a touchdown for Michigan in September 1945 against Great Lakes Navy.

Yerges took over as Michigan's quarterback in November 1945, replacing Ponsetto, after his leg was injured in a game against Illinois. In his first game as Michigan's starting quarterback, Yerges led the Wolverines to a 26–0 win over Minnesota on November 3, 1945. He scored Michigan's first touchdown of the game on a quarterback sneak in the first quarter. He also led the Wolverines to a 7–3 win over Ohio State in 1945.

Yerges was Michigan's starting quarterback in five games of the 1946 season, sharing the quarterback position with Jack Wiesenburger and Pete Elliott.

In March 1947, the Western Conference faculty representatives approved Yerges for a fifth season of competition, excusing his playing time for the Ohio State Buckeyes in 1943. The ruling proved fortunate for Michigan, as Yerges started nine of ten games for the 1947 Michigan Wolverines football team that went 10–0, outscored opponents 394 to 53, and won a national championship. Yerges was part of a backfield in 1947 that included Bob Chappuis, Bump Elliott and Jack Wiesenberger. The undefeated 1947 team became known as the "Mad Magicians" due to Coach Fritz Crisler's complex shifts, stunts, and schemes. As the field general of the "Mad Magicians" team, Yerges became known as "Crisler's 'second brain.'"

At the close of the regular season in late November 1947, Yerges was selected as the first-team All-Big Ten quarterback by five selectors, including the Associated Press and United Press, and as a second-team All-Big Ten player by one selector. The AP called Yerges the "unheralded field general and ball-handler of Michigan's magical attack." After the close of the 1947 season, Crisler said, "Pete Elliott was just as good a quarterback as Howard Yerges was the past season, but we used Yerges because the players had so much confidence in him ..."

Yerges played his final game in a Michigan uniform in the 1948 Rose Bowl, a 49 to 0 win over USC. Yerges both threw and caught touchdown passes in the 1948 Rose Bowl; he received an 18-yard pass from Bob Chappuis and threw a 29-yard touchdown pass to Dick Rifenberg.

== Later life and death ==
After graduating from Michigan, Yerges took a job in the fall of 1948 with the mechanical engineering department of a Flint, Michigan, automotive company.

When the 1947 Wolverines staged a ten-year reunion of their Rose Bowl championship in 1958, Yerges was the subject of a "whatever became of" feature story by the United Press International. The UPI wrote at the time: "Like all single wing signalcallers, Yerges was the unsung hero of that Wolverine powerhouse that swept to the 1947 Big Ten title and a subsequent 49-0 victory over Southern California in the Rose Bowl. But he blocked, faked and quarterbacked to perfection."

Yerges married Gale Huntington in 1951 and moved to St. Louis, where the couple lived for 30 years. He worked for Banquet Foods as vice president of engineering and labor relations. During his time in St. Louis, Yerges was also a part-time assistant coach and scout for the football team at John Burroughs School in Ladue, Missouri. In 1981, Yerges moved to Princess Anne, Maryland, where he led the engineering department for Perdue Farms. He died on December 24, 2000, at his home in Princess Anne.
