= 1944 Purdue Boilermakers football team =

American college football season

1944 Purdue Boilermakers football
- Conference: Big Ten Conference
- Record: 5–5 (4–2 Big Ten)
- Head coach: Cecil Isbell (1st season)
- MVP: Babe Dimancheff
- Captain: Babe Dimancheff
- Home stadium: Ross–Ade Stadium

1944 Big Ten Conference football standings
	Conf.					Overall
Team	W		L		T	W		L		T
No. 2 Ohio State $	6	–	0	–	0	9	–	0	–	0
No. 8 Michigan	5	–	2	–	0	8	–	2	–	0
Purdue	4	–	2	–	0	5	–	5	–	0
Minnesota	3	–	2	–	1	5	–	3	–	1
Indiana	4	–	3	–	0	7	–	3	–	0
No. 15 Illinois	3	–	3	–	0	5	–	4	–	1
Wisconsin	2	–	4	–	0	3	–	6	–	0
Northwestern	0	–	5	–	1	1	–	7	–	1
Iowa	0	–	6	–	0	1	–	7	–	0
+ – Conference co-champions; Rankings from AP Poll

The 1944 Purdue Boilermakers football team was an American football team that represented Purdue University during the 1944 Big Ten Conference football season. In their first season under head coach Cecil Isbell, the Boilermakers compiled a 5–5 record, finished in third place in the Big Ten Conference with a 4–2 record against conference opponents, and outscored opponents by a total of 207 to 166.

Notable players from the 1944 Purdue team included fullback Babe Dimancheff, end Frank Bauman, and tackle Pat O'Brien.

== Schedule ==
Date	Opponent	Rank	Site	Result	Attendance	Source
September 23	at Great Lakes Navy*		Ross Field; Great Lakes, IL	L 18–27	25,000	
September 30	Marquette*		Ross–Ade Stadium; Lafayette, IN	W 40–7	11,000	
October 7	at Illinois		Memorial Stadium; Champaign, IL (rivalry)	W 35–19	15,210	
October 14	No. 11 Iowa Pre-Flight*	No. 7	Ross–Ade Stadium; West Lafayette, IN	L 6–13	18,000	
October 21	at Iowa	No. 11	Iowa Stadium; Iowa City, IA	W 26–7	17,000	
October 28	at Michigan	No. 10	Michigan Stadium; Ann Arbor, MI	L 14–40	44,276	
November 4	Wisconsin^{†}		Ross–Ade Stadium; West Lafayette, IN	W 35–0	16,000	
November 11	at Northwestern		Dyche Stadium; Evanston, IL	W 27–7	25,000	
November 18	at No. 3 Navy*	No. 14	Municipal Stadium; Baltimore, MD	L 0–32	35,000	
November 25	Indiana		Ross–Ade Stadium; West Lafayette, IN (Old Oaken Bucket)	L 6–14	27,500	
*Non-conference game; ^{†}Homecoming; Rankings from AP Poll released prior to the game

== Rankings ==
Ranking movements Legend: ██ Increase in ranking ██ Decrease in ranking — = Not ranked ( ) = First-place votes
	Week								
Poll	1	2	3	4	5	6	7	8	Final
AP	7 (2)	11	10	—	—	14	—	—	—

== Games summaries ==
=== Marquette ===
- Bump Elliott 7 rushes, 121 yards

=== Indiana ===
- Babe Dimancheff 16 rushes, 140 yards

== Roster ==
- Pete Barbolak, T
- Frank Bauman, E
- Bill Canfield, QB-HB
- Angelo Carnaghi, HB-C
- Ed Chrobot, G
- Ed Cody, FB
- Joe Collings, E
- Babe Dimancheff, HB
- Stan Dubicki, HB
- Bump Elliott, HB
- Ken Glaesner, LG
- Arthur Haverstock, G
- Ted Held, HB
- Tom Hughes, T
- Tom Janes, G
- Morris Kaastad, G
- Nate Laskin, E
- Jim Lockwood, C
- Wally Lynch, G
- Jim McMillen, G
- George Mihal, FB
- Jack Morton, E
- Pat O'Brien, T
- Phil O'Reilly, T
- Bob Pfohl, HB
- Carl Piscopink, C
- Walt Poremba, C
- Harley Reagh, E
- Raymond Schultz, QB
- K. W. Sloan, G
- Jim Walley, QB
- Joe Winkler, C
