= Quentin Sickels =

American football player (1926–2018)

No. 62
- Position: Guard

Personal information
- Born: December 21, 1926; Benton Harbor, Michigan, U.S.
- Died: April 24, 2018 (aged 91); Palm Desert, California, U.S.

Career information
- College: Michigan
- NFL draft: 1948: 17th round, 147th overall pick

Career history
- 1944, 1946–1948: Michigan Wolverines

Awards and highlights
- National champion (1948)

Quentin Brian "Quent" Sickels (December 21, 1926 – April 24, 2018) was an American football player. He played college football for the University of Michigan in 1944 and from 1946 to 1948. He played on Michigan's undefeated 1947 and 1948 national championship teams. His college football career was interrupted by service in the United States Coast Guard during the 1945 football season.

== Early life ==
Sickels was the son of Fred Roy Sickels, the athletic director and coach at Benton Harbor Junior High School in Benton Harbor, Michigan and Lois Barker. He played three years of varsity football for Benton Harbor High School and led his team to the state championship as senior in 1943. At the end of the 1943 season, he was picked as a first-team all-conference player and was also "picked for a line spot on several All-State teams." He was also an honor student, a member of the National Honor Society, the National Thespians, vice-president of the Hi-Y Club, and a chief petty officer of the Sea Scouts.

== University of Michigan ==
Sickels enrolled at the University of Michigan in June 1944 with plans to major in marine architecture. He played four years of varsity football for the Michigan Wolverines football team under head coaches Fritz Crisler and Bennie Oosterbaan. Sickels was a member of Phi Kappa Psi fraternity at Michigan. He graduated in 1949 with a Bachelor of Business Administration.

=== 1944 season ===
Sickels played at the guard position as a 17-year-old freshman in 1944. He started all ten games for the 1944 Michigan team that was ranked #8 in the final AP Poll. After the 1944 season, Sickels was selected as a second-team All-Big Ten Conference player.

=== Military service ===
On December 21, 1944, the day before his eighteenth birthday, Sickels joined the United States Coast Guard. On leaving Ann Arbor, Sickels told reporters he hoped to return to the university after the war: "Michigan is a great school. Crisler, [Biggie] Munn and the other coaches were a great bunch of fellows, and I hope to come back and help beat the tar out of those guys at Ohio State." In February 1945, Sickels was assigned for training to the Coast Guard School in Groton, Connecticut. He served in the Coast Guard for a year-and-a-half and missed the 1945 season. He was discharged in the spring of 1946 after tours in Europe and the far east.

=== 1946 season ===
Sickels returned to the University of Michigan in time for summer football training in August 1946. He played for the 1946 Michigan Wolverines football team that finished the season ranked #6 in the final Associated Press poll.

=== 1947 season ===
In February 1947, Sickels underwent knee surgery at the University of Michigan Hospital. The surgery revealed that a bone chip suffered several years earlier had torn ligaments. Despite missing spring practice following the knee surgery, Sickels was able to play at the defensive guard position for the undefeated 1947 Michigan Wolverines football team. In November 1947, Sickels was selected by the Associated Press as "the outstanding guard of the nation" for two consecutive weeks. He was also recognized as an "honorable mention" on the United Press All-American team for 1947.

Sickels led the Michigan defense in its 49–0 victory over USC in the 1948 Rose Bowl. He played every minute on defense until he was knocked unconscious by a kick to the head late in the second quarter. The kick reportedly left "a dent in his headgear as large as a man's fist." Despite the injury, he returned to the game and played the second half. After the game, a newspaper account noted:

"Everyone agreed following the Jan. 1 game that Quentin was the outstanding defensive lineman on the field and that seldom had such an excellent performance been given by a guard in the bowl encounter. That well did Quentin perform. ... Sickels played like a 'mad man,' and indeed he was, for he remembers nothing of the fray from his injury until midway through the last quarter. Quentin was rushing passers unmercifully, making innumerable tackles in the Southern California backfield ..."

=== 1948 season ===
As a senior, Sickels helped lead the 1948 Michigan Wolverines football team to its second consecutive undefeated, untied season and an undisputed national championship. After a 35–0 victory over Navy in November 1948, The Michigan Daily selected Sickels as the lineman of the week. The paper noted: "Navy's game was just another contest for Sickels. He carried out his assignments with the same adeptness and fervor as in previous games. The Middies couldn't even trickle through his side of the line." After concluding his football career at Michigan, Sickels was honored at a banquet in his hometown attended by several of his Michigan teammates. Coach Oosterbaan wrote of Sickels, "No coach could ever ask for a finer gentleman or a better player."

== Later years and family ==
Sickels was selected in the 17th round by the Detroit Lions as the 147th pick in the 1948 NFL draft, but he chose a career in business. As of 1950, he was employed in Detroit by the Minnesota Mining and Manufacturing Company. That same year, he was engaged to Gloria Mary Morrison of Detroit. They were married in February 1951 at the North Woodward Congregational Church in Detroit. They had three children, Quentin Brian, Jr., Lauren Brook and Heather Ann.

From 1953 to 1958, Sickels was employed in Florida (two years in Orlando and three years in Miami) by Corporate Groups Service, Inc., an insurance company, as a vice president and general manager in charge of special workers' compensation plans.

In 1958, Sickels returned to Detroit and became employed as a registered representative of Manley, Bennett & Company, a member of the New York Stock Exchange. He remained with that company as they were acquired by Thomson McKinnon Securities in 1984. In 1989 he joined another investment firm, Roney & Co. in Auburn Hills, MI.

In 1963, Sickels was elected as the president of the University of Michigan's "M" Club.

After the death of his second wife Jeree in 2004, Quentin reconnected with Joanne Dart, whom he had met during the 1948 Rose Bowl. The two resided together until his death in 2018.
