= Gordon Appleby =

American football player (1923–2011)

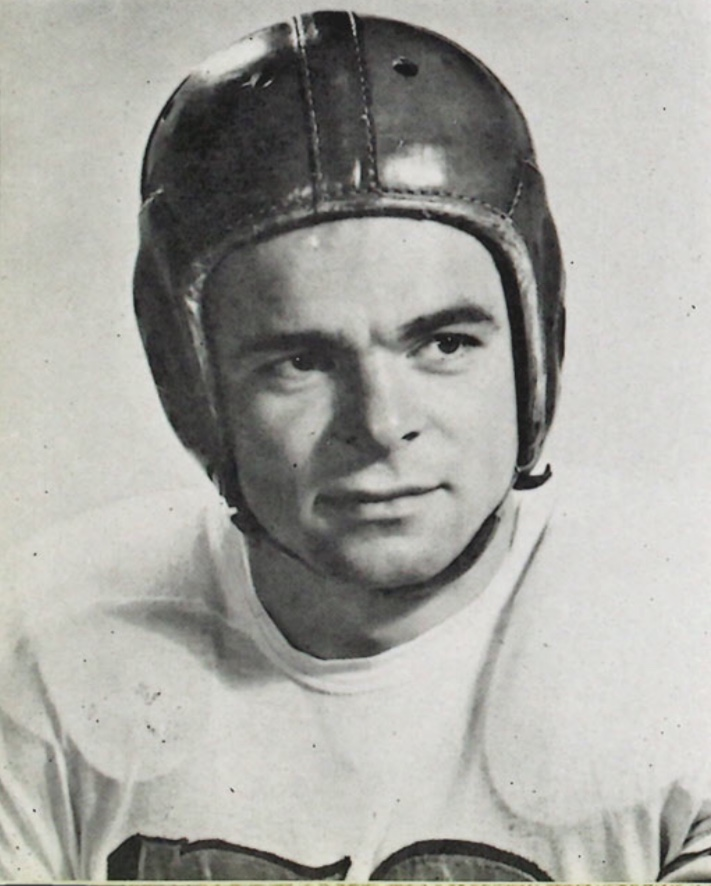
- Appleby from the 1945 Makio

Ohio State Buckeyes
- Position: Center

Personal information
- Born: June 4, 1923; Massillon, Ohio, U.S.
- Died: January 28, 2011; Flagstaff, Arizona, U.S.

Career information
- College: Ohio State (1943–1944)

Awards and highlights
- Second-team All-Big Ten (1944)

Gordon Earl Appleby (June 4, 1923 – January 28, 2011) was an American football center. A native of Massillon, Ohio, he played for the Ohio State Buckeyes. He was named the Buckeyes team MVP in 1943, and was a fourth-team selection by the United Press for its 1944 College Football All-America Team. He helped the Buckeyes to an undefeated season in 1944.

Appleby was drafted 26th overall in the third round by the New York Giants in the 1945 NFL draft but never played in the National Football League.
