= John Tavener (American football) =

American football player (1921–1993)

No. 27
- Positions: Center, linebacker

Personal information
- Born: January 10, 1921; Newark, Ohio, U.S.
- Died: September 19, 1993 (aged 72); Johnstown, Ohio, U.S.
- Listed height: 6 ft 0 in (1.83 m)
- Listed weight: 225 lb (102 kg)

Career information
- High school: Johnstown
- College: Indiana (1941-1944)
- NFL draft: 1944: 4th round, 28th overall pick

Career history
- Miami Seahawks (1946)

Awards and highlights
- Consensus All-American (1944); First-team All-Big Ten (1944); Second-team All-Big Ten (1943)

Career AAFC statistics
- Games played: 3
- Games started: 1
- Stats at Pro Football Reference
- College Football Hall of Fame

John Harold Tavener (January 10, 1921 – September 19, 1993) was an American gridiron football player, best known for his collegiate career with the Indiana Hoosiers. He was inducted to the College Football Hall of Fame in December 1990.

== Biography ==
Tavener was born in January 1921 in Newark, Ohio. He was a spring 1940 graduate of Granville High School in nearby Granville, Ohio, where he played baseball, basketball, and football. He then attended Indiana University, where he played freshman football during the fall 1940 season. He was a member of the varsity Hoosiers football team beginning in 1941, playing as a center, calling the team's offensive signals and kicking extra points. On defense, he played as a tackle.

In April 1944, Tavener was selected by the Chicago Cardinals in the fourth round of the 1944 NFL draft, with the 28th overall pick. However, after first accepting a role as line coach for the Denison University football team in Granville, he decided early in September 1944 to return to Indiana for an additional college season, rather that coaching at Denison or playing professionally in the National Football League (NFL). By playing an extra season, he became the first Indiana player to be awarded four varsity letters in a single sport.

Tavener served as team captain of the 1943 and 1944 Hoosier squads, and was a consensus selection to the 1944 College Football All-America Team. He was not accepted to military service during World War II, due to a concussion he suffered during the 1942 season.

Tavener played in several all-star games of the era. Following the 1943 season, he played in the 1944 edition of the East–West Shrine Game, held on January 1 in San Francisco, kicking an extra point for the East. In August 1944, he played in the Chicago College All-Star Game, on a college team that lost by three point to the Chicago Bears—he scored a touchdown when his quarterback fumbled at the goal line and Tavener recovered the ball in the end zone. He was also selected to play in the 1945 edition of the game, but had to withdraw after breaking his hand in practice. He did participate in the 1946 edition of the game as a substitute, on loan from his professional team at the time. Tavener played in the Blue–Gray Football Classic following the 1944 season, contested in December in Montgomery, Alabama, kicking an extra point for the North. He was also selected to play in the 1945 Blue–Gray game, but was dropped upon signing a professional contract.

In 1945, Tavener returned to his high school as the head football coach. Late in December 1945, Tavener signed a contract with the Miami Seahawks of the All-America Football Conference. Due to injury, he was limited to three games with the 1946 Miami Seahawks. In December 1946, he was part of a multi-player trade with the league's Brooklyn Dodgers, but there is no indication that he played for them.

Tavener went on to work for Banc Ohio Corporation for 38 years, retiring as a vice president. He was honored as an inductee to the athletic hall of fame at his high school in 1987–88, was inducted to the athletic hall of fame at Indiana University in 1990, and was inducted to the College Football Hall of Fame in 1990.

Tavener died in September 1993 at Grant Medical Center in Columbus, Ohio. He was survived by his wife, Lucy Tavener née Ashbrook, and by three sons and a daughter.
