= 1944 Northwestern Wildcats football team =

American college football season

1944 Northwestern Wildcats football
- Conference: Big Ten Conference
- Record: 1–7–1 (0–5–1 Big Ten)
- Head coach: Pappy Waldorf (10th season)
- MVP: Max Morris
- Captain: Ray Justak
- Home stadium: Dyche Stadium

1944 Big Ten Conference football standings
	Conf.					Overall
Team	W		L		T	W		L		T
No. 2 Ohio State $	6	–	0	–	0	9	–	0	–	0
No. 8 Michigan	5	–	2	–	0	8	–	2	–	0
Purdue	4	–	2	–	0	5	–	5	–	0
Minnesota	3	–	2	–	1	5	–	3	–	1
Indiana	4	–	3	–	0	7	–	3	–	0
No. 15 Illinois	3	–	3	–	0	5	–	4	–	1
Wisconsin	2	–	4	–	0	3	–	6	–	0
Northwestern	0	–	5	–	1	1	–	7	–	1
Iowa	0	–	6	–	0	1	–	7	–	0
+ – Conference co-champions; Rankings from AP Poll

The 1944 Northwestern Wildcats team represented Northwestern University during the 1944 Big Ten Conference football season. In their tenth year under head coach Pappy Waldorf, the Wildcats compiled a 1–7–1 record (0–5–1 against Big Ten Conference opponents) and finished in eighth place in the Big Ten Conference.

== Schedule ==
Date	Opponent	Site	Result	Attendance	Source
September 23	DePauw*	Dyche Stadium; Evanston, IL	W 62–0		
September 30	Wisconsin	Dyche Stadium; Evanston, IL	L 6–7		
October 7	Great Lakes Navy*	Dyche Stadium; Evanston, IL	L 0–25	35,000	
October 14	at No. 12 Michigan	Michigan Stadium; Ann Arbor, MI (rivalry)	L 0–27	30,861	
October 21	No. 20 Indiana	Dyche Stadium; Evanston, IL	L 7–14		
November 4	at Minnesota	Memorial Stadium; Minneapolis, MN	T 14–14	46,482	
November 11	Purdue	Dyche Stadium; Evanston, IL	L 7–27	25,000	
November 18	at No. 11 Notre Dame*	Notre Dame Stadium; Notre Dame, IN (rivalry)	L 0–21	39,701	
November 25	Illinois	Dyche Stadium; Evanston, IL (rivalry)	L 6–25	38,000	
*Non-conference game; Rankings from AP Poll released prior to the game
