= Milan Lazetich =

American football player (1921–1969)

- Lazetich, circa 1947

No. 27
- Positions: Tackle, guard, linebacker

Personal information
- Born: August 27, 1921; Anaconda, Montana, U.S.
- Died: July 9, 1969 (aged 47); Butte, Montana, U.S.
- Listed height: 6 ft 1 in (1.85 m)
- Listed weight: 211 lb (96 kg)

Career information
- High school: Anaconda
- College: Montana (1941); Michigan (1944)
- NFL draft: 1945: 2nd round, 16th overall pick

Career history
- Cleveland / Los Angeles Rams (1945–1950)

Awards and highlights
- NFL champion (1945); 2× First-team, All-NFL (1948, 1949); Second-team All-American (1944); First-team All-Big Ten (1944)

Career NFL statistics
- Games played: 59
- Games started: 23
- Fumble recoveries: 9
- Stats at Pro Football Reference

Milan "Sheriff" Lazetich (August 27, 1921 – July 9, 1969) was an American professional football player in the 1940s. He played college football for the University of Montana and University of Michigan. He was a first-team All-Big Ten tackle and second-team All-American in 1944 for the Michigan Wolverines. He later played professional football for the Cleveland / Los Angeles Rams. He played on the 1945 NFL Championship team as a rookie and was an All-Pro guard/linebacker for the Rams in 1948 and 1949.

== Early life ==
Lazetich was born in 1921 in Anaconda, Montana. He was the son of Peter Lazetich, a pioneer Serbian rancher. He grew up on his father's cattle ranch a few miles from Anaconda. Lazetich attended Anaconda High School where he played football and was selected as an all-state tackle three straight years in 1938, 1939 and 1940. He also played basketball and was a member of the track team. Two of his brothers were also all-state football players at Anaconda High School.

Lazetich played one year of college football at the University of Montana. In a spring game in April 1942, Lazetich returned a kickoff 90 yards. He joined the U.S. Navy during World War II but received a medical discharge. After being discharged from the Navy, Lazetich served as a deputy sheriff in Deer Lodge County, Montana. He also worked as a cowpuncher and rodeo rider.

=== University of Michigan ===
He enrolled at the University of Michigan where he played for Fritz Crisler's Wolverines football team in 1944. Because of his prior work in law enforcement, Lazetich was given the nickname the "Sheriff" by his Michigan teammates, a nickname that stuck throughout his football career. Lazetich was the star of the 1944 Wolverines team that went 8–2 and finished the season ranked #8 in the AP Poll. After being introduced to Big Ten football in 1944, Lazetich told reporters that "no end or back ever threw a block like a pony that has been running wild for a couple of years, especially when he feels the first touch of a saddle." An NEA wire service story reported: "To him the Big Nine schedule can't be as tough as the battering bucking broncs handed out."

In a pre-game story about the 1944 Michigan – Ohio State game, the Associated Press focused on Lazetich:

"The Michigan line is built around Milan Lazetich, a big tackle from Anaconda, Mont., who once was sheriff in his home community. He's the No. 1 All-America candidate from the Wolverine camp, so the reports say, but he's only one of a stalwart line which held Illinois speedsters without a score."

At the end of the 1944 season, Lazetich, in his sophomore season, was selected for the Associated Press All Big Ten Team as a first-team tackle. He was also picked as a second-team All-American by the Associated Press, Football Writers Association of America, International News Service, and Central Press Association.

=== Cleveland and Los Angeles Rams ===
In August 1945, the 23-year-old Michigan sophomore signed to play professional football for the Cleveland Rams. With the Rams, Lazetich was converted from a tackle to a guard on offense and linebacker on defense. Lazetich played in ten games at right guard for the Rams in 1945, and he helped the Rams to win the NFL championship in his first year as a professional player.

In 1946, the Rams moved to Los Angeles, giving California and the Pacific Coast its first major league sports team. Lazetich played for the Rams in their first five seasons in Los Angeles. When the Rams moved west, the Los Angeles Times ran an article introducing the city to the team's top players. In its feature on Lazetich, the Times noted that, in "Sheriff" Lazetich, the Rams had one of the country's greatest law enforcement officers in its line.

"Lazetich is a copper from Anaconda ... Lazetich was a deputy sheriff of Deer Lodge County but he has made most of his arrests on the football field ... Lazetich played freshman football at the University of Montana after which he moved up to Big Ten football ... While Lazetich was an All-Big Ten tackle for the Wolverines, he is the regular right guard of the Rams."

In the late 1940s, he was regarded as "one of the finest defensive right guards in pro football," and "50% of one of the best guard combinations in the National Football League." The Los Angeles Times gave Lazetich substantial credit for the success of the 1949 Rams. He was selected as a first-team NFL All-Pro by the Chicago-Herald American in 1948 and as a second-team NFL All-Pro by Pro Football Illustrated. In 1949, he was selected as a first-team All-NFL/AAFC player by the International News Service, the Hearst newspapers wire service.

Lazetich made a key play in the 1950 NFL Championship Game. With the Rams ahead, 28–27, and only five minutes left to play in the game, the Cleveland Browns were driving toward a score. After Browns quarterback Otto Graham carried the ball on a quarterback draw, "linebacker Milan Lazetich hit him from behind, forcing a fumble recovered by the Rams at their own 22-yard line with just 3:16 to play." Lazeitch also recovered the fumble and appeared to have sealed a victory for the Rams. However, the Rams were unable to run out the clock, and the Browns kicked a field goal in the game's last minute to win, 30–28.

In addition to his ability as a player, Lazetich developed a reputation as "a wild character if there ever was one." Decades later, Los Angeles Times sportswriter Frank Finch wrote that, although modern players were bigger and faster, he preferred the characters of the early NFL over the "faceless robots" of the modern game. He focused in particular on Lazetich: "A character's character was Ram middle guard Milan (Sheriff) Lazetich. He was a blithe spirit from Montana who'd played college football at Michigan before joining the Rams in '46 for a five-year stint. That he lasted that long with the club is remarkable in light of what he pulled at Dan Reeves' Christmas party for the team at the end of the '46 season." Reeves, the Rams' owner, invited the team to a party at his home; the centerpiece was a large cake in the design of a football field topped with a full-size football covered in chocolate. Teammate and Pro Football Hall of Famer Tom Fears later recalled the incident this way:

"During the course of predinner libations, someone asked Lazetich to demonstrate his punting prowess. I don't think he'd ever kicked a football before in his life. They dared him to boot the chocolate football, which was a big mistake because Laz wasn't the kind of guy to take a dare lightly. He ambled out to the kitchen, plucked the football off the top of the fancy cake, brought it out in the front room and drove his toe into it with beautiful form and a perfect follow through. Cake, frosting and everything else that was loose was well distributed over the ceiling, walls, windows and drapes. ... It also was the last party Reeves ever held in his house for the Rams."

By 1948, health problems began to affect Lazetich. Prior to the 1948 season, the Los Angeles Times reported on an unspecified medical condition that may prevent him from playing for the team. In November 1949, Lazetich was hospitalized in Pennsylvania during the football season for treatment of a stomach ulcer. He was given several blood transfusions, his condition was reported to be serious, and he was unable to play for the rest of the month.

In July 1951, Lazetich announced his retirement from football. At the time, the Los Angeles Times wrote: "Sorry to see the gruff rough Sheriff on the shelf. His departure leaves the Rams with only two members of the original cast of the 1945 world's championship team."

=== Later life ===
After retiring from football, Lazetich returned to Montana, where he worked for the Deer Lodge County, Montana road department, as a court bailiff and as a surveyor with the Montana Highway Department. He was a member of the Serbian Orthodox Church in Butte, Montana, the Bokelian Brotherhood Lodge in Butte, and the Serbian Fraternity of Anaconda.

Lazetich died in a hospital in Butte, Montana at age 47 in July 1969. He was buried with military honors at the Mount Olivet Cemetery after a funeral in Butte's Holy Trinity Serbian Orthodox Church. Lazetich was survived by his wife, the former Mary Laughlin, and his daughter Milana.

Lazetich's nephew, Pete Lazetich, helped the Stanford football team to a victory over his uncle's alma mater, Michigan, in the 1972 Rose Bowl. Pete Lazetich was part of Stanford's front four known as the "Thunder Chickens." The younger Lazetich made 11 tackles in the 1972 Rose Bowl.

== See also ==
- Michigan Wolverines Football All-Americans
- 1944 College Football All-America Team
