= Bill Hackett =

American football player (1923–1995)

Profile
- Position: Guard

Personal information
- Born: December 9, 1923
- Died: June 2, 1995 (aged 71)
- Listed height: 5 ft 9 in (1.75 m)
- Listed weight: 191 lb (87 kg)

Career information
- College: Ohio State
- NFL draft: 1945: 13th round, 131st overall pick

Career history
- 1942–1945: Ohio State

Awards and highlights
- Consensus All-American (1944); First-team All-Big Ten (1944)

William Charles Hackett (December 9, 1923 – June 2, 1995) was an American football guard at Ohio State University. He was a consensus All-American in 1944. After college, he became a doctor of veterinary medicine and played a part in the founding of the Cincinnati Bengals.

== Playing career ==
Hackett attended Ohio State University, where he played for the Ohio State Buckeyes football team from 1942 to 1944 under coach Paul Brown and in 1945 under coach Carroll Widdoes. He was a member of the Buckeyes' 1942 national championship team. In 1944, as a 5'9", 191-pound guard, he was recognized as a consensus first-team All-American, having received first-team honors from the Associated Press (AP), Football Writers Association of America (FWAA), and Collier's Weekly (Grantland Rice).

== After college football ==
After his undergraduate career at Ohio State, Hackett studied to become a veterinarian earning a D.V.M. in 1947 from Ohio State. Hackett moved to London, Ohio, and practiced general veterinary medicine for 10 years. In 1957, he took a job at Orleton Farms, Inc. as the livestock director. In 1963, he became the first veterinarian to serve on the Ohio State Racing Commission. While on the commission, he helped crack down on prohibited use of stimulants and depressants in race horses by establishing Ohio's race testing laboratory. In 1967, as founder and president of Ohio Feed Lot in South Charleston, Ohio, he focused on environmental cattle feeding operation. In conjunction with Searle Agriculture, Inc., he helped design and operate the first 150,000-ton capacity cattle waste fermenter for processing animal waste.

Hackett died On June 2, 1995. For his many accomplishments, he was honored several times including being named to the Ohio State University Athletic Hall of Fame and named Distinguished Alumnus by The Ohio State University College of Veterinary Medicine.

== Founding of the Cincinnati Bengals ==
Hackett played a part in the founding of the Cincinnati Bengals. While visiting his former coach Paul Brown in La Jolla, California, Hackett urged Brown to try to become the NFL commissioner the next time the job became vacant. Brown told Hackett that what he really wanted was to own a pro franchise. Brown explained that, his son, Mike Brown, thought Cincinnati would be a good place for a franchise. Hackett forwarded the idea to Ohio Governor, Jim Rhodes, and John Sawyer, president of Orelton Farms in London, Ohio, to gain political and financial support for the franchise. He served on the team's board of directors for many years.
