= 1944 All-Big Ten Conference football team =

American college football all-star team

The 1944 All-Big Ten Conference football team consists of American football players selected to the All-Big Ten Conference teams selected by the Associated Press (AP) and United Press (UP) for the 1944 Big Ten Conference football season.

== All Big-Ten selections ==
=== Ends ===
- Jack Dugger, Ohio State (AP-1; UP-1)
- Frank Bauman, Purdue (AP-1; UP-1)
- Duane F. Sickels, Northwestern (UP-2)
- Art Renner, Michigan (UP-2)

=== Tackles ===
- Milan Lazetich, Michigan (AP-1; UP-1)
- Bill Willis, Ohio State (AP-1; UP-1)
- Clement Bauman, Michigan (UP-2)
- Pat O'Brien, Purdue (UP-2)

=== Guards ===
- Bill Hackett, Ohio State (AP-1; UP-1)
- Ralph Serpico, Illinois (AP-1; UP-1)
- Ray Justak, Northwestern (UP-2)
- John Davey, Wisconsin (UP-2)

=== Centers ===
- John Tavener, Indiana (AP-1; UP-1)
- Gordon Appleby, Ohio State (UP-2)

=== Quarterbacks ===
- Les Horvath, Ohio State (AP-1 [halfback]; UP-1)
- Joe Ponsetto, Michigan (AP-1; UP-2)

=== Halfbacks ===
- Buddy Young, Illinois (AP-1; UP-1)
- Wayne Williams, Minnesota (UP-2)
- Bob Hoernschemeyer, Indiana (UP-2)

=== Fullbacks ===
- Babe Dimancheff, Purdue (AP-1 [fullback]; UP-1)
- Bob Wiese, Michigan (AP-2; UP-1)
- George M. Sundheim, Indiana (UP-2)

== Key ==
AP = Associated Press, chosen by conference coaches

UP = United Press

Bold = Consensus first-team selection of both the AP and UP

== See also ==
- 1944 College Football All-America Team
