= Les Horvath =

American football player (1921–1995)

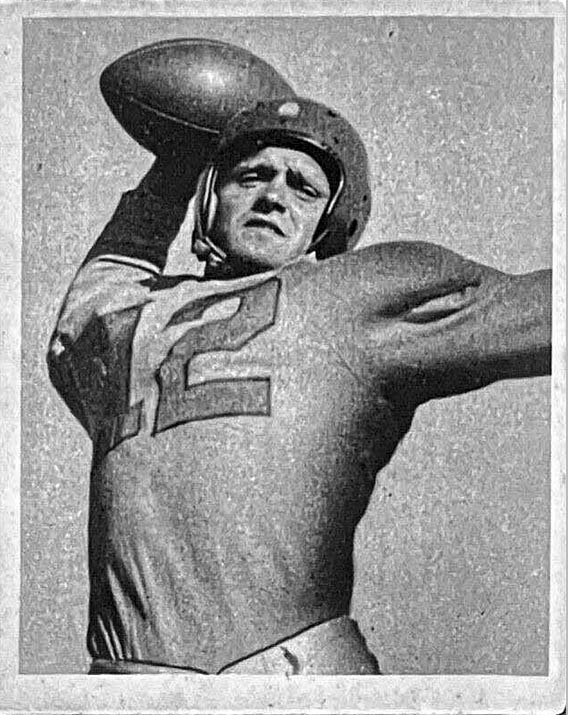
- Horvath depicted on a Bowman card of 1948

No. 12, 22, 92
- Position: Halfback

Personal information
- Born: October 12, 1921; South Bend, Indiana, U.S.
- Died: November 14, 1995 (aged 74); Glendale, California, U.S.
- Listed height: 5 ft 10 in (1.78 m)
- Listed weight: 173 lb (78 kg)

Career information
- High school: James Ford Rhodes (Cleveland, Ohio)
- College: Ohio State (1940–1942; 1944)
- NFL draft: 1943: 6th round, 45th overall pick

Career history
- Los Angeles Rams (1947–1948); Cleveland Browns (1949)

Awards and highlights
- AAFC champion (1949); 2× National champion (1942, 1944); Heisman Trophy (1944); SN Player of the Year (1944); Unanimous All-American (1944); Chicago Tribune Silver Football (1944); First-team All-Big Ten (1944); Ohio State Buckeyes No. 22 retired

Career NFL/AAFC statistics
- Rushing yards: 221
- Rushing average: 3.8
- Rushing touchdowns: 1
- Receptions: 9
- Receiving yards: 142
- Receiving touchdowns: 1
- Military career
- Allegiance: United States
- Branch: United States Navy
- Service years: 1945–1947
- Rank: Lieutenant junior
- Unit: Dental officer
- Conflicts: World War II
- Stats at Pro Football Reference
- College Football Hall of Fame

Leslie Horvath (October 12, 1921 – November 14, 1995) was an American football player. A quarterback, he won the Heisman Trophy while playing for the Ohio State Buckeyes in 1944. Horvath was the first Ohio State player to win the Heisman, an award given to the best college football player in the United States. The school retired his jersey number 22 in October 2000.

Horvath grew up in Parma, Ohio, a suburb of Cleveland and became a standout high school athlete despite his small stature. He entered Ohio State in 1939 on a work scholarship, but tried out for and made the football team the following year. He played as a reserve halfback on the 1942 team coached by Paul Brown that won Ohio State's first-ever national championship. Horvath graduated that year and moved to Ohio State's dental school. In 1944, however, acting Ohio State football coach Carroll Widdoes asked Horvath to rejoin the team, taking advantage of a World War II-era rule allowing graduate students with remaining eligibility to play. Horvath agreed, and helped lead the Buckeyes to a 9–0 record and a second-place showing in the AP poll. He won the Heisman and was named an All-American at the end of the season.

Horvath graduated from dental school in 1945 and served as a dental officer in the U.S. Navy for two years. Following his discharge, he played in the National Football League (NFL) for the Los Angeles Rams in 1947 and 1948 before being released and signing with the Cleveland Browns in |1949. The Browns won the All-America Football Conference (AAFC) championship that year. Horvath retired from playing in 1950 and moved to Los Angeles to practice dentistry, and lived there for the rest of his life. Horvath was inducted into the College Football Hall of Fame in 1966 and the Ohio State Athletics Hall of Fame in 1977.

== Early life ==
Horvath was born to immigrant parents from Hungary in 1921, in South Bend, Indiana; his family soon moved to Parma, Ohio, a suburb of Cleveland. He attended Parma Senior High School starting in 1936 and played on the track, basketball and football teams until the 11th grade. He decided to switch schools because he felt his basketball teammates were not taking the sport seriously. Horvath's family relocated, and in 1938 he enrolled at James Ford Rhodes High School in Cleveland, one of Parma's rivals. Playing as a quarterback for the Rhodes Rams, Horvath guided the team to seven straight wins in 1938, but the team lost to West Technical High School for a chance to be the Cleveland Senate League's Western Conference representative in the city championship. He graduated in 1939.

== College career ==
After graduating, Horvath attended Ohio State University on a work scholarship, but managed to make the school's football team in 1940. Horvath was small for a football player – he weighed just 160 pounds (73 kg) – but was a quick runner and had a strong arm. Ohio State's football team was a disappointment in 1940, however, finishing the season with a 4–4 win–loss record under head coach Francis Schmidt. Schmidt was fired after the season and replaced by Paul Brown, an Ohio high school coach who had guided Massillon Washington to a series of undefeated records and state championships. Brown simplified Ohio State's offense, but imposed a level of discipline and organization that had been absent under Schmidt. Horvath was a reserve halfback in the Buckeyes' single-wing offense in 1941, when the team posted a 6–1–1 win–loss–tie record and finished second in the Big Ten Conference standings. He played in many games, but senior fullback Jack Graf and senior halfback Tom Kinkade got most of the carries for Ohio State.

Despite his small frame, Brown recognized Horvath's potential as a senior in 1942 and made him a regular starter at halfback beside Paul Sarringhaus and fullback Gene Fekete. While Sarringhaus and Fekete were Ohio State's main offensive weapons, Horvath averaged eight yards per carry in a victory over Pittsburgh and scored two touchdowns and passed for 109 yards in a win over Illinois in Cleveland. Ohio State was ranked first in the country in the AP poll early in the season, but fell in the rankings after a loss to Wisconsin in October. The team won the rest of its games, however, including a 21–7 victory over arch-rival Michigan at the end of the season. Horvath passed to Sarringhaus for a 35-yard touchdown and caught another 32-yard touchdown pass from Sarringhaus in the Michigan game. Ohio State's 9–1 record put it on top of the Big Ten standings and in the final AP poll, giving the school its first-ever national championship.

Horvath expected his college football career to be over in 1942. He finished his undergraduate degree that year and enrolled in a graduate program at the Ohio State University College of Dentistry. Ohio State's football program, meanwhile, struggled in 1943 after Brown and many of its best players entered the military during World War II. Carroll Widdoes, an assistant under Brown, was appointed the acting head coach and led the team to a 3–6 record.

The following year, Widdoes asked Horvath to return to the team, taking advantage of a wartime rule that allowed college programs to use graduate students if they had not exhausted their four years of college eligibility. Widdoes promised Horvath a leading role as the team's left halfback, a level of prominence he had been denied under Brown. Horvath agreed to come back and be a veteran leader for a team that was composed mostly of freshmen because of older players' service in the war. Horvath had a breakout season in 1944, gaining 669 rushing yards and 1,200 all-purpose yards as the Buckeyes turned in a 9–0 record and finished second in the national polls. The highlights of Horvath's season included scoring the winning touchdown in Ohio State's annual matchup against Michigan. Calling all of Ohio State's offensive plays, he was nicknamed the "playing coach".

Horvath was named a first-team All-American by sportswriters and the Most Valuable Player in the Big Ten after the season. He was voted by his teammates as Ohio State's Most Valuable Player. He also won the Heisman Trophy, an award given each year to the best college football player in the country. Horvath was the first Ohio State player to win the Heisman, and he remains the only Heisman winner not to have played football the previous season. In early 1945, Horvath played in the annual East–West Shrine Game, a college all-star game. While at Ohio State, he was a member of Delta Tau Delta fraternity.

== Military and professional career ==
After graduating from Ohio State's dental school in 1945, Horvath signed to play for the Cleveland Rams of the National Football League. Horvath, however, applied for a commission to join the U.S. Navy and was sworn in as a lieutenant j.g. that August. He was sent at first to Naval Station Great Lakes in Illinois for training, where he practiced dentistry and acted as an assistant to Brown, who had entered the Navy and was coaching the base's football team. Horvath served in Hawaii and coached a football team there that won a service national championship. He later traveled on assignment as far as China as a naval dental officer.

Before his discharge from the Navy in 1947, there was speculation that Horvath might join the Cleveland Browns, a new team coached by Brown in the All-America Football Conference (AAFC). Horvath was still under contract with the Rams, however, and joined the team, which had moved from Cleveland to Los Angeles in 1946. Led by quarterback Bob Waterfield, Los Angeles finished the season with a 6–6 record in 1947. Horvath rushed for 68 yards and had three receptions. Horvath had 118 yards of rushing the next season, when the Rams finished with a 6–5–1 record and took third place in the NFL West division.

Horvath, who worked as a dentist in the offseason in Los Angeles, was released by the Rams in 1949. He signed with the Browns a week later, closing his dental office and moving to Cleveland to reunite with Brown. Horvath, who was used primarily on defense early in the season, had an 84-yard fumble return for a touchdown in a game against the New York Yankees, and ran for two touchdowns in a November game against the Chicago Hornets. Cleveland finished the season with a 9–1–2 record and won a fourth straight AAFC championship. The AAFC disbanded after the season and the Browns were absorbed by the NFL, but Horvath decided to quit football to practice dentistry back in California.

== Later life and death ==
Horvath married Shirley Phillips, an airline hostess after the 1949 season, and moved back to Los Angeles. He coached little league football and practiced dentistry in Glendale, California, a major Los Angeles suburb, for the rest of his life. His wife died in 1973, he remarried two years later to Ruby Aylor, whom he met in Hawaii while on vacation in 1974. They were married for 20 years, until Horvath's death in 1995 of heart failure.

Horvath was inducted into the College Football Hall of Fame in 1966 and became a member of Ohio State's athletics hall of fame in 1977. Ohio State retired his number 22 uniform in 2001, six years after his death. He was inducted into the Parma Senior High School athletics hall of fame in 2007.

== Awards and honors ==
- 1944 Heisman Trophy winner
- 1944 First-team All-American
- College Football Hall of Fame inductee (class of 1966)
- Ohio State "Block O" Varsity Hall of Fame inductee (class of 1977)
- Parma Senior High School Hall of Fame inductee (class of 2007)
- Number retired by Ohio State (#22)
