= Babe Dimancheff =

American football player (1922–2008)

No. 23, 18, 87, 41
- Position: Halfback

Personal information
- Born: September 6, 1922; Indianapolis, Indiana, U.S.
- Died: October 17, 2008 (aged 86)
- Listed height: 5 ft 11 in (1.80 m)
- Listed weight: 178 lb (81 kg)

Career information
- High school: George Washington Community (Indianapolis)
- College: Butler (1941-1942); Purdue (1943-1944)
- NFL draft: 1944: 3rd round, 27th overall pick

Career history

Playing
- Boston Yanks (1945–1946); Chicago Cardinals (1947–1950); Chicago Bears (1952)

Coaching
- Hamtramck HS (MI) (1954–1956); Pittsburgh Steelers (1957–1959) Running back/wide receiver; Dallas Cowboys (1960–1961) Offensive coordinator; Wake Forest (1962–1963) Offensive coordinator; Philadelphia Bulldogs (1964–1965); Chicago Bears (1966–1972) Wide receiver; Southern California Sun (1974-1975) Offensive coordinator

Awards and highlights
- NFL champion (1947); UFL Championship (1964); First-team All-American (1944); First-team All-Big Ten (1944); Purdue Athletics Hall of Fame (2009)

Career NFL statistics
- Rushing yards: 802
- Rushing average: 3.9
- Receptions: 61
- Receiving yards: 1,086
- Total touchdowns: 15
- Stats at Pro Football Reference

Boris Stephan "Babe" Dimancheff (September 6, 1922 – October 17, 2008) was an American professional football player who was a halfback in the National Football League (NFL) for the Boston Yanks (1945–1946), the Chicago Cardinals (1947–1950), and the Chicago Bears (1952). He played college football for the Purdue Boilermakers.

== Early life ==
Dimancheff attended George Washington Community High School, where he lettered in football, basketball and track. He was a captain of both the football and basketball teams. In 1940, he received the Dyer Medal Award for Best Character and Athlete in the City of Indianapolis. As a senior, he was named All-state and All-city in both football and basketball.

He moved on to play football at Butler University, where he played left halfback and was named the freshman team captain. In his second year he received All-Conference honors, before military service in World War II interrupted his college career.

He returned to play at Purdue University, starting at fullback during the 1943 and 1944 seasons. He starred in a powerful backfield, alongside Tony Butkovich. In 1943, he led the Boilermakers to a perfect season, the Big Ten Conference title and a #3 AP ranking. His senior season (1944) was his best year as he was selected as the team captain, named to the International News Service's All-American team, named All-Big Ten (1st team) and was selected as the Most Valuable Player in the Big 9 Conference. He played in the East–West Shrine Game in 1944.

In 2007, he was inducted into the Indiana Football Hall of Fame. In 2009, he was inducted into the Purdue Athletics Hall of Fame.

== Professional career ==
Dimancheff was selected by the Boston Yanks in the third round (27th overall) of the 1944 NFL draft. He began his playing career in 1945 as a halfback.

In 1947, he played for the Chicago Cardinals and led them to win the NFL championship. The next year, he helped the team reach the NFL championship game again, where they lost to the Philadelphia Eagles. At one time he held the franchise records for Most Yardage Gained on Kickoff returns and Longest Kickoff return. He finished his career with the Chicago Bears in 1952.

== NFL career statistics ==
Legend
	Won the NFL championship
**Bold**	Career high

Year	Team	Games		Rushing					Receiving				
Year	Team	GP	GS	Att	Yds	Avg	Lng	TD	Rec	Yds	Avg	Lng	TD
1945	BOS	5	2	30	69	2.3	15	0	1	15	15.0	15	0
1946	BOS	8	6	**57**	**238**	4.2	24	0	5	121	**24.2**	45	1
1947	CRD	12	2	30	116	3.9	14	0	**22**	**438**	19.9	**80**	**4**
1948	CRD	12	0	27	117	4.3	26	1	13	260	20.0	52	3
1949	CRD	10	1	38	151	4.0	22	**3**	10	130	13.0	50	1
1950	CRD	7	0	8	5	0.6	5	0	5	53	10.6	17	0
1952	CHI	9	2	17	106	**6.2**	**77**	1	5	69	13.8	41	1
		63	13	207	802	3.9	77	5	61	1,086	17.8	80	10

== Coaching career ==
Following his NFL career he moved into the coaching ranks, In 1951, he became the backfield coach at Butler University. In 1953 he coached at Purdue University.

From 1954 to 1956 he coached at Hamtramck High School, in Hamtramck, Michigan. There he led the Maroons to two state titles. His star player was Willie Fleming.

After winning his second state title, Dimancheff returned to the NFL, where he spent 12 seasons as a coach and director of player personnel. In 1957, he began as the backfield and receivers coach for the Pittsburgh Steelers and was also the team's director of player personnel. He spent the 1957 through 1959 seasons with the Steelers.

In 1960, he joined the Dallas Cowboys for their inaugural season, becoming the first backfield coach in franchise history. After two years in Dallas, he accepted the offensive coordinator position at Wake Forest University. By 1964, he was the head coach and general manager of the Canton Bulldogs of the United Football League. In 1965, he moved with the franchise to Philadelphia and coached the Bulldogs for one season in the Continental Football League.

By 1966, Dimancheff was back in the NFL as the receivers coach and director of player personnel for George Halas and the Chicago Bears. Dimancheff spent seven seasons in Chicago before moving on to the World Football League (WFL) and a job as the offensive coordinator for the Southern California Sun. When the league folded after the 1975 season, he remained in Southern California.
