= Jack Dugger =

American football player (1923–1988)

No. 50, 74, 13
- Positions: Tackle, defensive end

Personal information
- Born: January 13, 1923; Pittsburgh, Pennsylvania, U.S.
- Died: February 23, 1988 (aged 65); Charlotte, North Carolina, U.S.
- Listed height: 6 ft 3 in (1.91 m)
- Listed weight: 230 lb (104 kg)

Career information
- High school: Canton McKinley (Canton, Ohio)
- College: Ohio State
- NFL draft: 1945: 2nd round, 12th overall pick

Career history
- Buffalo Bisons (1946); Detroit Lions (1947–1948); Chicago Bears (1949)

Awards and highlights
- Consensus All-American (1944); First-team All-Big Ten (1944)

Career NFL/AAFC statistics
- Games played: 37
- Games started: 12
- Fumble recoveries: 2
- Stats at Pro Football Reference

John Richard Rabbit Dugger (January 13, 1923 – February 23, 1988) was an American professional athlete who played football for three seasons in the National Football League (NFL) with the Detroit Lions and Chicago Bears and professional basketball for one season with the Syracuse Nationals in the National Basketball League (NBL).

== College career ==
Dugger was a nine-time letterman at Ohio State University who'd gone to high school at Canton McKinley High School in Canton, Ohio. In football, he started as a tackle in his sophomore year of 1942, but he switched to left end his junior and senior years. He was a consensus first-team All-American in 1944. He also excelled as a shot-putter and discus thrower in track, and was a stand-out basketball player. He was voted Ohio State's most valuable basketball player in 1942. For three years, he earned letters in all three sports. He earned the Big 10 Award, for excellence in both athletics and academics.

Before the games were cancelled due to World War II, he was invited to try out for the Olympics as a shot-putter.

== Professional career ==
He was selected by the Pittsburgh Steelers in the second round of the 1945 NFL draft. He was also a member of the Buffalo Bisons of the All-America Football Conference (AAFC).

Dugger also played one year of professional basketball. He played for the Syracuse Nationals in the National Basketball League (NBL) during the 1946–47 season and averaged 1.7 points per game.

== Later life ==
After leaving professional sports, Dugger went into trucking. He became president of Suburban Motor Freight, Point Express and Tucker Motor Freight. In 1979, he was elected to the Ohio State Sports Hall of Fame.
