= Buddy Young =

American football player and track athlete (1926–1983)

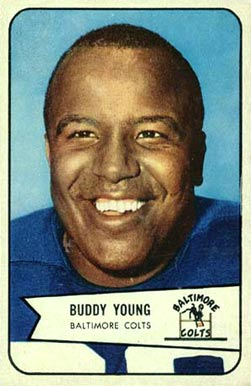
- Young with the Baltimore Colts

No. 76, 22
- Position: Halfback

Personal information
- Born: January 5, 1926; Chicago, Illinois, U.S.
- Died: September 4, 1983 (aged 57); Terrell, Texas, U.S.
- Listed height: 5 ft 4 in (1.63 m)
- Listed weight: 175 lb (79 kg)

Career information
- College: Illinois

Career history
- New York Yankees (1947–1949); New York Yanks (1950–1951); Dallas Texans (1952); Baltimore Colts (1953–1955)

Awards and highlights
- Pro Bowl (1954); NFL kickoff return yards leader (1952); Baltimore Colts No. 22 retired; First-team All-American (1944); First-team All-Big Ten (1944)

Career statistics
- Rushing yards: 2,727
- Rushing average: 4.6
- Rushing touchdowns: 17
- Receptions: 179
- Receiving yards: 2,711
- Receiving average: 15.1
- Receiving touchdowns: 21
- Stats at Pro Football Reference
- College Football Hall of Fame

Claude Henry K. "Buddy" Young (January 5, 1926 – September 4, 1983) was an American professional football player and executive in the National Football League (NFL). A native of Chicago, he was Illinois state champ in track and field in the 100-yard dash. The 5'4" Young, also known as the "Bronze Bullet", had exceptional quickness and acceleration. He is one of the shortest men ever to play in the NFL, he was drafted in the 1947 AAFC Draft in the Special Draft by the New York Yankees. As a track star at the University of Illinois, he won the National Collegiate Championships in the 100 and 220-yard dash, tied the world record for the 45 and 60-yard dashes (6.1 in the latter event), and was the Amateur Athletic Union's 100-meter champion.

== Early life ==
Young was as impressive on the gridiron as on the track. He received scholarship offers from several schools, including the University of Michigan, Drake University, Marquette University and the University of Illinois. He chose Illinois and established himself as a star immediately. In his first game for the Illini, he scampered 64 yards for a touchdown on the first play from scrimmage. On his second carry, he ran for a 30-yard touchdown. In all, in his debut he gained 139 yards on 7 carries, an average of 19.7 yards. Before the season concluded, he scored 10 touchdowns equaling the Big Ten Conference record established by the immortal Red Grange in 1924.

These unusual early successes brought the freshman running back national attention. "Not since the days when Red Grange was ripping up the sod...for Bob Zuppke and the Illini has there been so much pigskin excitement on the University of Illinois Campus." Sportscaster Bill Stern called him "The fastest thing in cleats and the runner of the year." Ray Eliot, Young's coach, referred to him as "The best running back I have ever seen." Only a freshman, Young was named to several All-America teams.

== Military service ==
Football, like other aspects of American life, had to endure wartime hardships. Manpower difficulties forced NFL teams to reduce their rosters from 33 to 25. Some colleges ended football programs for the duration. And most college players had their education and playing days interrupted by wartime commitments. Young was no different. In late January 1945, Young was drafted by the Navy. Initially he reported to the Great Lakes Naval Training Station, but was eventually transferred to the US Naval Training and Distribution Center, Shoemaker, California (also known as Fleet City), near what is now Dublin, California. Like many star athletes, Young played football for a service team. Coast service teams, one writer claimed, "unquestionably played the toughest football extant during the war. The personnel of the league were 30 percent All-American, 30 percent professional and 40 percent better than the average college squad."

In mid-December, the top two coast service teams met for the championship. In an earlier contest the Fleet City Bluejackets, Buddy's team, had prevailed 7–0. The championship game was played in Los Angeles at Memorial Stadium before 65,000 fans. It was one of Buddy Young's greatest games. After a scoreless first quarter, Young returned a kickoff for a 94-yard touchdown, he ran back another kickoff for an 88-yard touchdown, and took a hand-off from O'Rourke and scampered 30 yards for a third. The Bluejackets won the game 45–28 to complete an unbeaten season. They challenged the unbeaten West Point team, but the cadets refused the invitation.

Young's performance won accolades from players, coaches, writers, and fans. Charlie O'Rourke still talks excitedly about the game and Young's ability. An opponent stated that he had "never seen his equal" and Aldo Forte remarked: "I've seen the greatest in pro football. None can compare with Young." El Toro coach Dick Hanley, who had coached Northwestern, called Young "the greatest college back I've ever seen." Bluejackets Coach Bill Reinhart declared that he had "never seen anything like Buddy Young." Sports columnist Slip Madigan also considered Young superior to Blanchard and Davis. And comedian Bob Hope observed: "I'd heard of black magic...now I've seen it!"

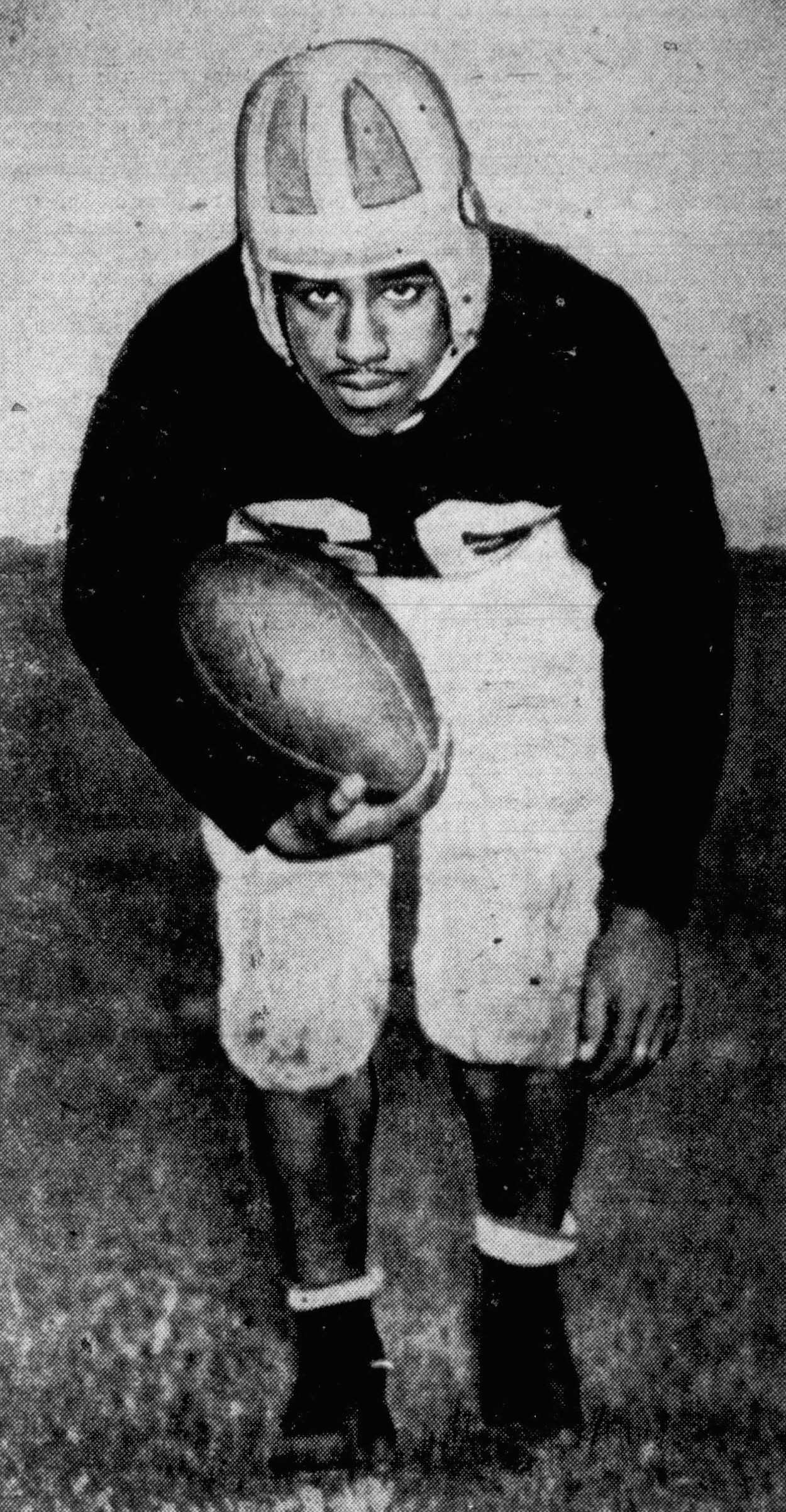
Young, circa 1946

Rumors circulated that once Young fulfilled his service obligation he would be drafted by the NFL or lured to the University of California, Los Angeles (UCLA) to play for the Bruins. Neither proved true. Young returned to the University of Illinois and helped the Illini in the 1947 Rose Bowl, where he was named Co-Player of the Game, after Illinois hammered UCLA, 45–14.

World War II proved a major boon to sports integration. Not only did the war promote the ideals of democracy and fair play, it also gave blacks a chance to showcase their talents on college, semi-professional and service teams. In football, three of the most talented minority athletes during the war years were Bill Willis, Marion Motley and Young. Buddy was one of the first black men to play pro football; he played on teams where he was typically one of two or three black players, and undoubtedly he had his rough spots, but his warm, bubbling personality carried him through, and made him immensely popular.

== Professional career ==
=== New York Yankees (AAFC) ===
Young played ten years in pro football. He was one of the special selections awarded to the New York Yankees in the 1947 AAFC Draft. In 1950, Young, along with many of the other Yankee players, joined the New York Yanks of the National Football League when the AAFC folded.

Young was recognized with an honorable mention for the Associated Press' 1951 All-Pro Team at safety.

=== New York Yanks / Baltimore Colts ===
The Yanks moved to Dallas after the 1951 NFL season, and the franchise lasted one season there. The holdings and the players of the Texans franchise were moved to Baltimore. Young came with the franchise to Dallas and then was one of 11 Texans players who subsequently played for the Colts. Young retired from football after the 1955 season.

Young was a threat at several positions: five times in his professional career, he eclipsed 1,000 all purpose yards, and in 1954, he was selected to the NFL Pro Bowl team. Over his nine-year professional career, NFL and AAFL, Young averaged 4.6 yards per carry as a running back, over 15 yards per reception as a receiver, and almost 28 yards per kickoff return, peaking at a remarkable 34.4 yards per return for the Colts in 1953. In a 1953 game against the Philadelphia Eagles, Young returned the opening kickoff 104 yards for a touchdown; at the time, this was the second longest kickoff return in NFL history.

== Personal life ==
Young was the first Colt to have his number retired, 22. In 1964, he was hired by the NFL, joining their scouting and public relations department and becoming the first African-American executive hired by a major sports league. He was inducted into the College Football Hall of Fame in 1968.

In 1970, Young received the American Academy of Achievement's Golden Plate Award, which was presented to him at an awards ceremony in Dallas, Texas.

On September 4, 1983, Young died in a car accident at age 57. At the time, he was living in Hartsdale, New York, and was director of player relations for the NFL.
