= Dick Rifenburg =

American football player and sportscaster (1926–1994)

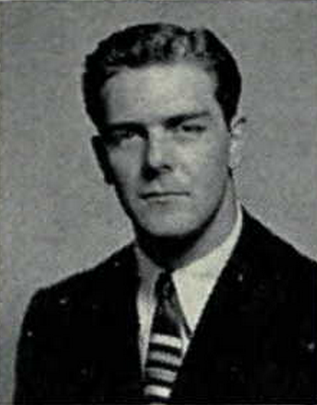
- Rifenburg from 1950 Michiganensian

No. 89
- Position: End

Personal information
- Born: August 26, 1926; Petoskey, Michigan, U.S.
- Died: December 5, 1994 (aged 68); Cheektowaga, New York, U.S.
- Listed height: 6 ft 3 in (1.91 m)
- Listed weight: 195 lb (88 kg)

Career information
- High school: Arthur Hill (Saginaw, Michigan)
- College: Michigan
- NFL draft: 1948: 7th round, 132nd overall pick

Career history
- Detroit Lions (1950)

Awards and highlights
- National champion (1948); Consensus All-American (1948); First-team All-Big Ten (1948)

Career NFL statistics
- Receptions: 10
- Receiving yards: 96
- Touchdowns: 1
- Stats at Pro Football Reference

Richard Gale Rifenburg (August 21, 1926 – December 5, 1994) was an American professional football player and a pioneering television broadcaster for the forerunner to WIVB-TV in Buffalo. He played college football for the University of Michigan Wolverines in 1944 and from 1946 to 1948. He was a consensus selection at end on the 1948 College Football All-America Team. Rifenburg played professionally in the National Football League (NFL) with the Detroit Lions for one season in 1950. After retiring from football he settled in Buffalo and became a sports broadcaster. He worked as a color commentator and as a play-by-play announcer for the Buffalo Bulls. He hosted various television and radio sports shows and was eventually inducted into the Buffalo Broadcasters Hall of Fame.

In college, he led the Big Ten Conference in single season receptions during his senior year and set Michigan Wolverines receptions records for both career touchdown and single-season touchdowns. He had also been a Michigan High School Athletic Association (MHSAA) state champion in both basketball and track and field. His college career was interrupted by World War II service, and his high school career was also affected by the war due to the MHSAA's cancellation of state championships in all sports in 1943.

== High school ==
Rifenburg was born in Petoskey, Michigan, and raised in Kalamazoo, Michigan before his family moved to Saginaw, Michigan. Rifenburg was a star athlete at Saginaw's Arthur Hill High School in football, basketball, and track and field. In 1943, Michigan canceled boys high school tournaments in all sports due to World War II, and they did not return until the fall of 1944. In 1944, he led Arthur Hill High to the MHSAA Class A high school basketball championship (over Kalamazoo Central High School), scoring 24 points, including 17 in the second half, of the championship game. Rifenburg was also the state champion in 1944 in both the shot put 46 feet 11 inches (14.30 m) and high jump 5 feet 8.5 inches (1.74 m). He also led Arthur Hill in football, and his high school accomplishments are featured in Glory: The history of Saginaw County sports by Jack Tany (ASIN B0006RH9Z6), which is a book on high school sports in Saginaw County, Michigan. Rifenburg was named All State in football, basketball and track.

It is ironic that Rifenburg was born in Petoskey, Michigan in 1926 for several reasons. Ted Petoskey preceded Rifenburg as an All-American end on the University of Michigan football team. Petoskey had excelled as a representative of Saginaw County in MHSAA competition. Petoskey posted significant football accomplishments in 1926 making 1926 a significant year for himself as well. Achieving All-American status as an end at Michigan would be Rifenburg's next step after excelling in MHSAA competition.

== College ==
In the fall of 1944, Rifenburg enrolled at the University of Michigan. The United Press syndicate ran a feature article about Rifenburg in September 1944 that opened as follows: "Another great end has made his appearance on the Big Ten football horizon in the person of Dick Rifenburg, 18-year-old Michigan freshman. Every so often a great offensive end comes along, a player who has to learn how to play defense, but who has the natural speed, smooth actions, height and big hands that is the mark of an outstanding pass receiver. Rifenburg has laid claim to that rating. A loose-limbed 180-pound freshman from Saginaw, Mich., Rifenberg is being boomed as the Big Ten's next 'freshman sensation.'" As a freshman, he caught two touchdown passes in his first college football game against Iowa. In an article titled "Teens and TNT," Time reported on Rifenburg's performance: "Of the few teams already in action, Michigan's teens rang the freshman bell loudest last week by winning their opener, 12 -to-7, against the strong Iowa Seahawks (Naval Pre-Flight); 6-ft. 4 Freshman End Dick Rifenburg caught passes and ran for both Michigan touchdowns."

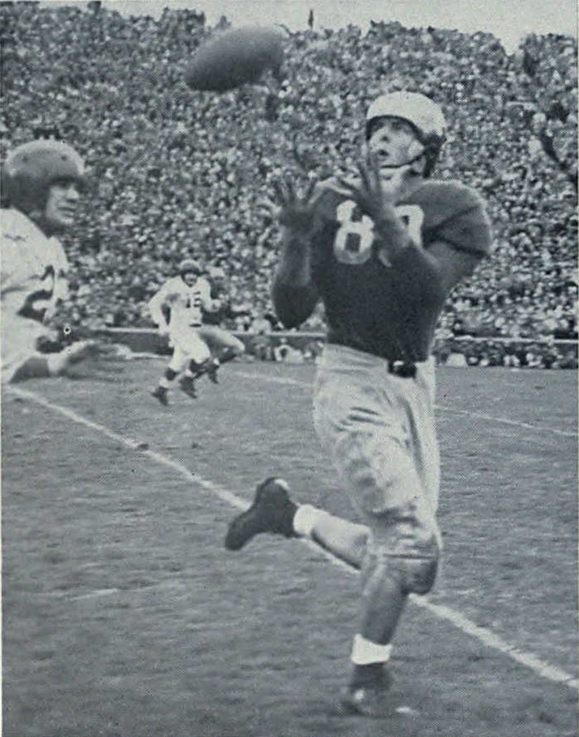
Rifenburg catching a touchdown pass against Indiana in 1947.

Rifenburg's college career was interrupted by World War II service in the United States Navy, but after missing the 1945 season, he returned to play for the Wolverines from 1946 to 1948. Rifenburg played for the Wolverines in consecutive undefeated National Championship seasons in 1947 and 1948. He started nine games for the 1947 team. The 1947 team referred to as "Michigan's Mad Magicians" is considered to be the greatest University of Michigan football team of all time. Rifenberg and teammate Len Ford had the reputation as the team practical jokers. During the 1947 game against Wisconsin, Rifenburg started calling signals for the Badgers. Wisconsin's offense protested to officials, who "prowled the Wolverines secondary but never caught their man." Rifenburg continued to scramble Badger signals, as Rifenburg's teammates laughed at his scheme. In the January 1, 1948 Rose Bowl that season, Michigan rolled to a 49–0 victory over USC, and they outgained the Trojans 491 yards to 133. Rifenburg caught a 29-yard pass for the game's final score.

In the 1948 championship season, Rifenburg scored eight touchdowns, caught 22 passes, and gained 610 yards (508 receiving and 102 rushing). Rifenburg was the second highest scoring end in the nation in 1948, and he was a consensus All-American as a senior, being selected as first-team on nine of the 11 All-American teams. Rifenburg led the Big Ten in receptions.

Although Rifenburg finished fourth among midwestern Heisman voters in 1948, he did not finish among the top eight. By comparison, Notre Dame end Leon Hart won the Heisman Trophy in 1949 but made only eight of the 11 All-American teams. It is not clear why Rifenburg did not finish higher. However, it is fairly clear that sportswriters of that era had a bias against Michigan. In the Associated Press poll at the end of the 1947 season, the Notre Dame Fighting Irish were ranked ahead of the University of Michigan, though both teams were undefeated. Some noted that every Southern AP voter had voted for Notre Dame, which had yet to integrate, whereas three of Michigan's star players (Bob Mann, Gene Derricotte, and Len Ford) were African-American. The Southern schools refused even to schedule games against schools that played African-American players.

Rifenburg was considered one of the greatest Wolverines of the 1940s. In four seasons with the Michigan Wolverines, Rifenburg played in 32 games and had over 1,000 yards of total offense. Rifenburg held the University of Michigan's single season and career record for touchdown receptions (eight in a season; sixteen career) until his records were broken by Anthony Carter in 1980.

== Professional career ==
In 1948, Rifenburg was drafted 132nd overall by the Philadelphia Eagles in the 15th round of the NFL draft, and he was also drafted by the New York Yankees of the All-America Football Conference. He had intended to play in 1949 with the Yankees, but suffered a knee injury in a practice session for the August 1949 Chicago College All-Star Game. Press accounts at the time noted that the injury "will probably keep him out of pro football all season, if not forever." The incident led to a debate as to whether NFL owners should "bar their men from playing with the college all-stars."

Rifenburg landed a job at WJR radio in Detroit, but he left his sportscaster's job to join the Detroit Lions. In the 1950 NFL season, Rifenburg came back from his injury to play for the Detroit Lions. He played in 12 games and had ten receptions for 96 yards and one touchdown for the 1950 Lions. Rifenburg recalled that his playing time with the Lions was limited because the Lions also signed 1949 Heisman Trophy winner Leon Hart, who played the same position.

In May 1951, he announced he was retiring from professional football to become sports director at a radio station in Buffalo. He was hired as a sportscaster by WBEN (now known as WIVB), which had just started the first television station in Buffalo and the only one serving Southern Ontario. This was an early foray into television by the Buffalo Evening News. In the 1950s, Rifenburg hosted a popular panel show called "Let's Talk Sports" in Buffalo and also pioneered an early morning exercise program. He also worked for WBEN (AM) and WBEN (FM) and as the sideline announcer for Buffalo Bills games along with Van Miller, the long time Bills play-by-play announcer. In addition, he served as the play-by-play announcer for the University of Buffalo Bulls football team. As a radio broadcaster, he is remembered for things ranging from ski reports, to 17 years worth of "Breakfast At —" programs live from various local restaurants, to 27 years as the WBEN-AM All Night Show host.

After 30 years with WBEN and a change in ownership for the station, his show was replaced with the Mutual Network's The Larry King Show. In the 1980s, Rifenburg taught communications at Buffalo's Medaille College and served as a disc jockey on Public Broadcasting's radio station WEBR (now WDCZ). He also sold ads for Buffalo Evening News competitor, Buffalo Courier-Express. Rifenburg's final employer was Erie County, who hired him as an inmate training supervisor at the Erie County Correctional Facility.

Rifenburg was posthumously inducted into the Buffalo Broadcasters Hall of Fame in September 2007. He was given the Golden Age Award which is reserved for "those who did it first, the people who had no pattern to follow." The Hall of Fame award was presented to Rifenburg's wife, Jane. In her acceptance speech, Jane Rifenburg observed that despite all of her late husband's achievements, there was one thing he had never received: "He had a great career, but he never had a trophy. And now he has."

== Family ==
Rifenburg lived 37 of his years in Buffalo. His first wife, Ruth Arlene Martini, died in September 1961. His second wife, the former Jane Morris, was the head of the Buffalo Jills cheerleaders when they met. Rifenburg died in Cheektowaga, New York in December 1994; he was 68 years old. Doug was a 1988 first-team football All-Western New York linebacker for Clarence High School.

== See also ==
- List of Michigan Wolverines football All-Americans
- Lists of Michigan Wolverines football receiving leaders
