= Joseph Ponsetto =

American football player (1926–2004)

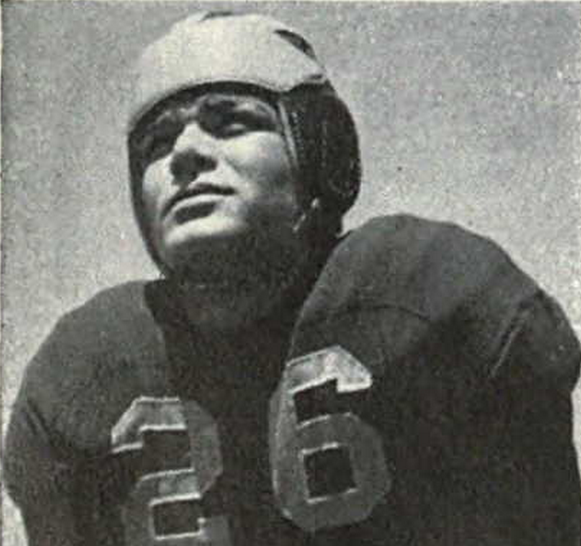
- Ponsetto from 1946 Michiganensian

Profile
- Position: Quarterback

Personal information
- Born: March 26, 1926
- Died: November 24, 2004 (aged 78); Kent County, Michigan, U.S.

Career information
- College: Michigan

Awards and highlights
- First-team All-Big Ten (1944); Second-team All-Big Ten (1945)

Joseph Ponsetto (March 29, 1926 – November 24, 2004) was an American football player who was the starting quarterback for the University of Michigan Wolverines football teams of 1944 and 1945.

Playing under head coach Fritz Crisler, Ponsetto led the 1944 team to an 8–2 record and a #8 ranking in the final AP Poll. Ponsetto was selected as an All-Big Ten quarterback in 1944 and was elected captain of the 1945 team. He also handled place-kicking responsibilities for the Wolverines, converting four extra points against Minnesota, four more against Purdue, and five against Penn in 1944.

Ponsetto led the 1945 team to a 7–3 record and a #6 ranking in the final AP Poll.

After the 1945 season, Ponsetto underwent surgery on his knee. In September 1946, doctors advised that Ponsetto's knee may not withstand the stress of playing football.

After graduating from Michigan, Ponsetto became a dentist in the Grand Rapids, Michigan area. He married Mary Blynn Manley and had five children.
