= 1943 Michigan Wolverines football team =

American college football season

1943 Michigan Wolverines football
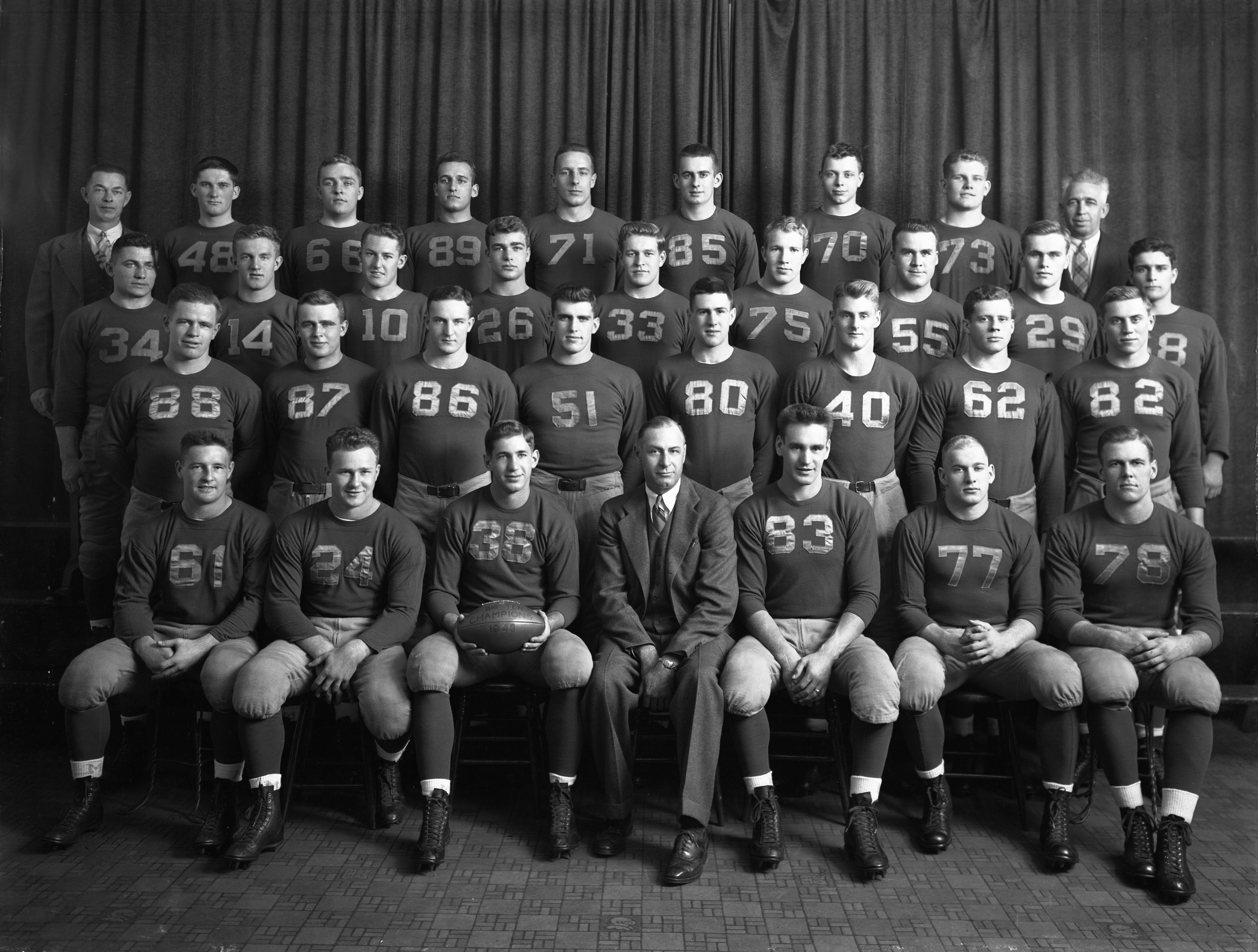

Big Ten co-champion
- Conference: Big Ten Conference

Ranking
- AP: No. 3
- Record: 8–1 (6–0 Big Ten)
- Head coach: Fritz Crisler (6th season)
- Offensive scheme: Single-wing
- MVP: Bob Wiese
- Captain: Paul White
- Home stadium: Michigan Stadium

1943 Big Ten Conference football standings
	Conf.					Overall
Team	W		L		T	W		L		T
No. 5 Purdue +	6	–	0	–	0	9	–	0	–	0
No. 3 Michigan +	6	–	0	–	0	8	–	1	–	0
No. 9 Northwestern	5	–	1	–	0	6	–	2	–	0
Indiana	2	–	3	–	1	4	–	4	–	2
Minnesota	2	–	3	–	0	5	–	4	–	0
Illinois	2	–	4	–	0	3	–	7	–	0
Ohio State	1	–	4	–	0	3	–	6	–	0
Wisconsin	1	–	6	–	0	1	–	9	–	0
Iowa	0	–	4	–	1	1	–	6	–	1
+ – Conference co-champions; Rankings from AP Poll

The 1943 Michigan Wolverines football team represented the University of Michigan in the 1943 Big Ten Conference football season. Fritz Crisler, in his sixth year as head coach, led the team to an 8–1 record and a tie with Purdue for the Western Conference championship. The team was ranked No. 3 in the final AP Poll behind Notre Dame and the Iowa Pre-Flight School. (It was ranked No. 2 by Litkenhous.) Michigan outscored its opponents 302 to 73 in nine games. The team's total of 302 points (33.5 points per game) was the highest point total for a Michigan team since the 1917 team scored 304 points in 10 games (30.4 points per game). Defensively, the team held every opponent, except Notre Dame, to seven or fewer points.

After opening the season with three consecutive victories, the Wolverines lost to Notre Dame by a 35–12 score in game matching teams ranked #1 and #2 in the AP Poll. In the fifth game of the season, the team responded with a 49–6 victory over a Minnesota team ranked #11 by the AP. The game marked the worst defeat to that time in the history of the Minnesota football program and Michigan's first victory over the Golden Gophers since 1932. The Wolverines finished the season with a 45–7 victory over Ohio State—the largest margin of victory in the Michigan–Ohio State football rivalry since Michigan's 86–0 victory in 1902.

At the end of the season, several Michigan players received individual honors. Despite missing the last three games of the season due to military service, fullback Bill Daley finished seventh in the voting for the Heisman Trophy and was selected as consensus All-American. Daley led the team in both rushing and scoring, totaling 817 rushing yards and 59 points in six games. Daley gained 216 of his rushing yards in Michigan's 21–7 over Northwestern.

Bob Wiese, who played at quarterback and fullback, was selected by his teammates as the most valuable player on the 1943 team and finished in a tie for second in voting for the Chicago Tribune Silver Football trophy presented to the most valuable player in the Western Conference. Right tackle Merv Pregulman was also selected as a first-team All-American by Collier's Weekly and Stars & Stripes. center Fred Negus was also selected as a first-team All-Western Conference player.

== Schedule ==
Date	Opponent	Rank	Site	Result	Attendance
September 18	at Camp Grant*		Rockford, IL	W 26–0	11,000
September 25	Western Michigan*		Michigan Stadium; Ann Arbor, MI	W 57–6	14,008
October 2	at Northwestern		Dyche Stadium; Evanston, IL (rivalry)	W 21–7	32,077
October 9	No. 1 Notre Dame*	No. 2	Michigan Stadium; Ann Arbor, MI (rivalry)	L 12–35	86,408
October 23	No. 11 Minnesota^{†}	No. 10	Michigan Stadium; Ann Arbor, MI (Little Brown Jug)	W 49–6	42,966
October 30	at Illinois	No. 6	Memorial Stadium; Champaign, IL (rivalry)	W 42–6	15,724
November 6	Indiana	No. 6	Michigan Stadium; Ann Arbor, MI	W 23–6	19,759
November 13	Wisconsin	No. 4	Michigan Stadium; Ann Arbor, MI	W 27–0	15,047
November 20	Ohio State	No. 4	Michigan Stadium; Ann Arbor, MI (rivalry)	W 45–7	39,139
*Non-conference game; ^{†}Homecoming; Rankings from AP Poll released prior to the game

== Rankings ==
Ranking movements Legend: ██ Increase in ranking ██ Decrease in ranking ( ) = First-place votes
	Week								
Poll	1	2	3	4	5	6	7	8	Final
AP	2 (36)	9	10	7	6	4	4	3	3 (1)

== Season summary ==
=== Pre-season ===
The 1943 season was Fritz Crisler's sixth as the head coach at Michigan. His 1942 team had concluded its season with a 7–3 record and a #9 ranking in the final AP Poll. Several key players from the 1942 team, including tackles Albert Wistert and Bill Pritula, quarterback George Ceithaml, and end Elmer Madar, were lost to graduation. Several others were called up to active military service, including backs Bob Chappuis, Tom Kuzma and Don Robinson. Another key player expected to return was right guard Julius Franks, who in 1942 became Michigan's first African-American player to be selected as an All-American. Franks contracted tuberculosis at the start of the school year and missed the entire 1943 season. Fritz Crisler announced on September 7 that Franks had been lost for the season due to illness.

While Michigan lost a number of key players to wartime service, the school's military training programs (including the V-12 Navy College Training Program) also resulted in more than a dozen players being transferred to Michigan from other schools. The two most highly touted transfers joining the Michigan program in 1943 were fullback Bill Daley from Minnesota and Elroy "Crazy Legs" Hirsch from Wisconsin. After watching Hirsch in pre-season practice, Associated Press football writer Jerry Liska referred to "squirming Elroy Hirsch" as "Wisconsin's gold-plated wartime gift to Michigan." Daley and Hirsch became Michigan's most powerful offensive weapons during the 1943 season and were dubbed Michigan's "lend-lease backs."

The arrival of players from other universities required Michigan veterans to be flexible. Merv Pregulman was credited with being Michigan's "Handy Man" for adapting to a new role. Pregulman was a guard for Michigan in 1941 and the starting center in 1942, but moved to right tackle to make room for Fred Negus of Wisconsin at center. With a pre-season injury to place-kicker Jim Brieske, Pregulman also was given responsibility for kick offs and place-kicking extra points.

With World War II being fought in Europe and the Pacific, some universities, including Michigan State, canceled their football programs for the 1943 season. In April 1943, Fritz Crisler, who was Michigan's athletic director as well as its football coach, announced that the university would continue "a complete schedule in all sports even if Michigan does not receive a dime in revenue." With thousands arriving in the area to work in war industries, Crisler opined the college football would serve civilian morale. More importantly, Crisler touted the training impact of the sport: "There is no substitute for football in physical training. The physical advantages of this contact game have been proved repeatedly and are now being demonstrated once more on the battlefield. Football teaches resourcefulness. It develops initiative, demands quick thinking under pressure, and requires courage."

Also in April 1943, it was reported that Michigan's 1940 Heisman Trophy winner Tom Harmon was missing in action. Harmon was serving as a bomber pilot in the Army Air Corps and disappeared while flying a mission in South America. Harmon's bomber had crashed in the jungle in Brazil, killing the entire crew with the exception Harmon. Harmon survived after reportedly hacked his way through the jungle. On learning that Harmon had been found, Fritz Crisler called Harmon "the greatest competitor in the history of football" and added, "And I'll betcha he doesn't have a scratch on him."

In August 1943, Albert Benbrook, an All-American who had starred on Fielding H. Yost's Michigan teams from 1908 to 1910, died in Texas.

=== Week 1: at Camp Grant ===
Week 1: Michigan at Camp Grant

Team	1	2	3	4	Total
• Michigan	6	6	7	7	26
Camp Grant	0	0	0	0	0

- Date: September 18, 1943
- Location: Rockford, Illinois
- Game attendance: 11,000–12,000
- Referee: Fred Gardner (Cornell)

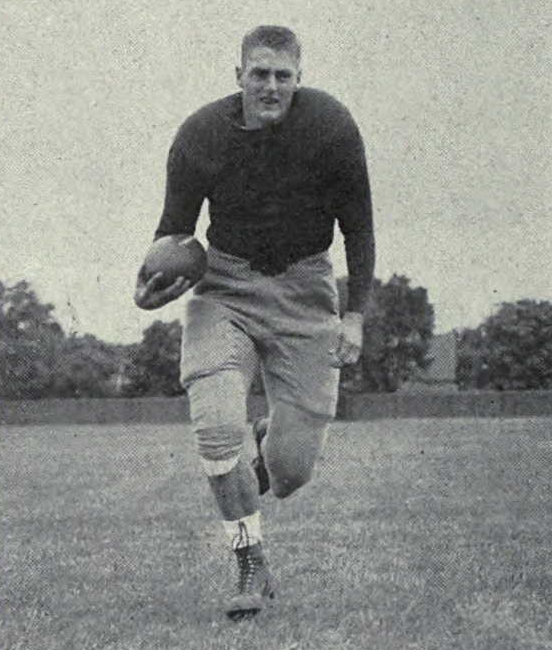
Elroy Hirsch from the 1944 Michiganensian

On September 18, 1943, Michigan opened the season with a 26-0 victory over the United States Army's Camp Grant Warriors. Camp Grant had opened its season the prior week with a 23-0 victory over Illinois and featured fullback Corwin Clatt, who played for Notre Dame in 1942 and later played in the NFL. In previous years, Michigan had opened its season against Michigan State, but Michigan State did not field a team in 1943. Camp Grant was coached by Michigan State coach Charlie Bachman and replaced the Spartans as Michigan's opponent for the season opener. The game was played in Rockford, Illinois before "a capacity crowd of 6,000 soldiers and 5,000 civilians."

Elroy Hirsch was the star of the game for Michigan with a long kickoff return, two touchdowns and an interception. Hirsch had played for Wisconsin in 1942, but was transferred to Michigan as part of the V-12 Navy College Training Program. In his first game as a Wolverine, Hirsch returned the opening kickoff 50 yards "with some dazzling open-field running" to midfield. Hirsch capped the opening drive with a three-yard touchdown run, and Bill Daley, another V-12 transfer student, missed the extra point kick. In the second quarter, Jack Wink, another Wisconsin transfer student, took over at quarterback and completed a 30-yard pass to Art Renner at Camp Grant's three-yard line. Hirsch ran for his second touchdown, and Daley again missed the extra point kick. Paul White scored on a reverse from Daley in the third quarter, and Merv Pregulman kicked the extra point to give Michigan the lead at 19-0. Michigan's final score was set up when Hirsch intercepted a pass on the Camp Grant 39-yard line. Daley scored Michigan's final touchdown on a 23-yard run in the fourth quarter, and Pregulman kicked his second extra point. Paul White also tallied an interception in the third quarter after Camp Grant had taken the ball to the Michigan 12-yard line.

Michigan dominated the game statistically with 226 rushing yards, 138 passing yards, and three interceptions. The Wolverines held Camp Grant to four first downs, 43 rushing yards, and 51 passing yards. The account of the game published by the International News Service emphasized Michigan's teamwork and noted that Michigan was "considered the 1943 powerhouse of collegiate football."

Michigan's starting lineup against Camp Grant was Rudy Smeja (left end), Bob Hanzlik (left tackle), John Gallagher (left guard), Fred Negus (center), George Kraeger (right guard), Merv Pregulman (right tackle), Art Renner (right end), Bob Wiese (quarterback), Elroy Hirsch (left halfback), Paul White (right halfback), and Bill Daley (fullback). Players appearing in the game as substitutes for Michigan were Hank Olshanski, Fenwick Crane, Rex Wells, Farnham Johnson, Bob Rennebohm, and Clifton Myll (ends); John Greene, Robert Kennedy, Clem Bauman and Fred Bryan (tackles), Amstutz, Robert Fischer, William Sigler and Jack Trump (guards); Harold Watts (center); Bob Nussbaumer, Wally Dreyer, Jack Petoskey, Jim Holgate, Jack Wink, Joe Ponsetto, Hugh Mack, Jim Aliber, Don Lund, Earl Maves and Bob Stenberg (backs).

=== Week 2: Western Michigan ===
Week 2: Western Michigan at Michigan

Team	1	2	3	4	Total
Western Michigan	0	6	0	0	6
• Michigan	15	14	14	14	57

- Date: September 25, 1943
- Location: Michigan Stadium, Ann Arbor, Michigan
- Game attendance: 18,000
- Referee: Lyle Clarno (Bradley)

In the second game of the 1943 season, Michigan defeated Western Michigan by a score of 57 to 6 before a crowd of only 18,000 spectators at Michigan Stadium. Michigan scored two touchdowns in each quarter, and its 57 points was the highest single-game total since 1939. Elroy Hirsch scored two touchdowns in the first quarter, and Michigan also scored on a safety in the opening quarter when Bob Hanzlik tackled Bob Mellen in the end zone. Bill Daley had a 65-yard touchdown run in the second quarter, and Bob Nussbaumer, substituting for Hirsch, also scored two touchdowns. Michigan's remaining touchdowns were scored by Bob Wiese, Wally Dreyer and Bill Culligan. Merv Pregulman converted on seven of eight extra point kicks. Western Michigan's touchdown came on a two-yard run by Augie Camarata in the second quarter. The Chicago Daily Tribune reported that head coach Fritz Crisler "tried vainly to stem the tide by resorting to fourth and fifth string players after the regulars had piled up a convincing early lead." A total of 43 players appeared in the game for Michigan.

Michigan's starting lineup against Western Michigan was Rudy Smeja (left end), Bob Hanzlik (left tackle), George Kraeger (left guard), Fred Negus (center), John Gallagher (right guard), Merv Pregulman (right tackle), Art Renner (right end), Bob Wiese (quarterback), Elroy Hirsch (left halfback), Paul White (right halfback), and Bill Daley (fullback). Players appearing in the game as substitutes for Michigan were Bob Rennebohn, Farnham Johnson, Jack Petoskey, Hank Olshanski, Alan Schwartz, Vincent Mroz, Bruce Hilkene, and Clifton Myll (ends); John Greene, Clem Bauman, Fred Bryan and Robert Kennedy (tackles); Rex Wells, Ralph Amstutz, Jack Trump, Robert Fischer, William Rohrback (guards); John Crandell (center); Jack Wink, Joe Ponsetto, Hugh Mack and Jim Aliber (quarterbacks); Bob Nussbaumer, Wally Dreyer, Lynch, Jim Holgate, William Culligan, James Brown and Jerome Powers (halfbacks); and Don Lund, Bob Stenberg, and Earl Maves (fullbacks).

=== Week 3: at Northwestern ===
Week 3: Michigan at Northwestern

Team	1	2	3	4	Total
• Michigan	14	0	0	7	21
Northwestern	0	0	0	7	7

- Date: October 2, 1943
- Location: Dyche Stadium, Evanston, Illinois
- Game attendance: 40,000

On October 2, 1943, Michigan defeated the Northwestern Wildcats by a score of 21 to 7 at Evanston, Illinois. Bill Daley was the star of the game for Michigan, rushing for 216 yards and two touchdowns on 26 carries (an average of 8.3 yards per carry). Wilfrid Smith in the Chicago Daily Tribune wrote: "The difference between victory and defeat yesterday was Daley. Few players ever have so throroly [sic] dominated an offense." On the game's first play from scrimmage, Daley scored on a 37-yard sweep around the right end, "tearing out of a tackler's arms on the 10 yard line." Elroy Hirsch also scored on three-yard touchdown run in the first quarter. Hirsch's touchdown was set up by a 67-yard "quick kick" by Hirsch that was rolled dead at the Northwestern one-yard line. Northwestern was forced to punt into the wind, giving Michigan good field position at the Northwestern 29-yard line. Northwestern scored on a 12-yard run by 1943 Western Conference MVP Otto Graham in the fourth quarter. Thirty seconds after the touchdown by Graham, Daley scored on a 64-yard run, described in one account as "a mouse trap play." On Daley's long run, Northwestern's Otto Graham, playing at the safety position, was the last man Daley needed to pass. Daley ran directly at Graham and "then cut away cleanly" for the touchdown. Merv Pregulman converted on all three extra point kicks for Michigan. Pregulman also intercepted a pass thrown by Graham to stop a late drive by the Wildcats. Through the first three games, Michigan's backs had combined for 753 rushing yards.

Michigan's starting lineup against Northwestern was Rudy Smeja (left end), Bob Hanzlik (left tackle), George Kraeger (left guard), Fred Negus (center), John Gallagher (right guard), Merv Pregulman (right tackle), Art Renner (right end), Bob Wiese (quarterback), Elroy Hirsch (left halfback), Paul White (right halfback), and Bill Daley (fullback). Substitutes for Michigan were Bob Rennebohm, Farnham Johnson and Vincent Mroz (end); John Greene (tackle); Rex Wells (guard); William Culligan, Bob Wiese, Wally Dreyer and Don Lund (backs).

=== Week 4: Notre Dame ===
Week 4: Notre Dame at Michigan

Team	1	2	3	4	Total
• Notre Dame	7	14	14	0	35
Michigan	0	6	0	6	12

- Date: October 9, 1943
- Location: Michigan Stadium, Ann Arbor, Michigan
- Game attendance: 85,688

On October 9, 1943, Michigan faced Notre Dame in the most anticipated game of the 1943 college football season. Notre Dame, coached by Frank Leahy and led by 1943 Heisman Trophy winner Angelo Bertelli, came into the game ranked #1 in the AP Poll with 53 first place votes. Michigan came into the game ranked #2 receiving 36 first place votes. The game drew a record crowd of 85,688 spectators to Michigan Stadium. The previous record was a crowd of 85,088 that attended the 1929 Michigan-Ohio State game. The crowd also set the mark as the highest attendance at any college football game for the 1943 season. Michigan had defeated Notre Dame, 32-20, in the 1942 season. Michigan coach Fritz Crisler announced before the game that Elroy Hirsch was suffering from damaged knee ligaments and might not be able to play.

Notre Dame defeated Michigan in the game by a score of 35 to 12. According to the United Press game account, Bertelli's passing "caught the Wolverine secondary flatfooted and out of position repeatedly to make the rout complete." Another reporter wrote that Bertelli had "proved his mastery of the intricacies of the T formation and his superb control of forward passes." Notre Dame's first touchdown came on a 66-yard run by Creighton Miller. Michigan scored in the second quarter on four-yard touchdown run by Art Renner, but Pregulman's extra point attempt failed after Elroy Hirsch initially bobbled the snap. Following the kickoff, Bertelli threw a pass to Fred Early for a 69-yard scoring play and Notre Dame led 14-6. Notre Dame scored again late in the second quarter on a 34-yard pass from Bertelli to John Zilly followed by a two-yard touchdown run by Jim Mello. Notre Dame led, 21-6, at halftime.

The third quarter was marked by a malfunction of the electric clock at Michigan Stadium, resulting in a third quarter that lasted 23 minutes. In the Chicago Daily Tribune, Wilfrid Smith analogized to the 1927 Long Count Fight and wrote that the period "will be remembered as the 'long third quarter' of collegiate sport." Notre Dame outscored Michigan 14-0 in the long third quarter, scoring on a quarterback sneak by Bertelli and a pass from Bertelli to Miller. After nine plays had been run in the fourth quarter, the timing error was discovered, and an announcement was made over the stadium's public address system that only two-and-a-half minutes remained in the game, as the fourth quarter was shortened to seven minutes. The only points in the short fourth quarter came on the last play of the game as Elroy Hirsch threw a 13-yard touchdown pass to Paul White.

Despite the lopsided score, Michigan totaled 15 first downs in the game compared to 13 for Notre Dame. Bill Daley gained 135 rushing yards on 24 carries in the game. Michigan gained a total of 210 rushing yards and 89 passing yards.

In the AP Poll following the game, Notre Dame garnered 86 of 99 first place votes, and Michigan dropped from #2 to #9. Notre Dame went on to win the 1943 national championship, maintaining its #1 ranking in the AP Poll through the remainder of the season.

Michigan's starting lineup against Notre Dame was Rudy Smeja (left end), Bob Hanzlik (left tackle), John Gallagher (left guard), Fred Negus (center), George Kraeger (right guard), Merv Pregulman (right tackle), Art Renner (right end), Bob Wiese (quarterback), Elroy Hirsch (left halfback), Paul White (right halfback), and Bill Daley (fullback). Jack Wink substituted for Wiese at quarterback, and Wiese moved to fullback with Daley moving to left halfback.

=== Week 5: Minnesota ===
Week 5: Minnesota at Michigan

Team	1	2	3	4	Total
Minnesota	0	6	0	0	6
• Michigan	7	7	14	21	49

- Date: October 23, 1943
- Location: Michigan Stadium, Ann Arbor, Michigan
- Game start: 1:30 p.m. (C.W.T.)
- Game attendance: 45,000
- Referee: William A. Blake (Loras)

After a bye week following the loss to Notre Dame, the Wolverines faced the Minnesota Golden Gophers in the annual Little Brown Jug game on October 23, 1943. The Wolverines had lost nine straight games to Bernie Bierman's Minnesota teams, the last Michigan victory having been in 1932.

Prior to the game, it was reported that Michigan's lineup would shortly be depleted by wartime transfers. Michigan's team captain and second leading rusher Paul White had received orders transferring him to the Marine Corps Recruit Depot Parris Island, effective immediately after the Minnesota game. Three other Wolverines players, Bob Steinberg, Jim Holgate, and Len Naab were also ordered to Parris Island. Adding to the roster problems, the Navy announced one day before the Minnesota game that it was transferring fullback Bill Daley, right tackle Merv Pregulman, and end Jack Petoskey to new posts effective November 1.

Michigan defeated Minnesota in the 1943 matchup by a score of 49 to 6 in front of a crowd of 45,000 spectators at Michigan Stadium. The 43-point margin made it the worst defeat sustained by a Minnesota team to that point in the program's history. On the first play from scrimmage, Elroy Hirsch ran 61 yards on a reverse around right end for a touchdown. Hirsch scored a total of three touchdowns and also intercepted a Minnesota pass to stop a drive in the fourth quarter. Bill Daley, the V-12 transfer who played for Minnesota in 1942, became the first player to play for both sides in Little Brown Jug games. Prior to the game, the Chicago Daily Tribune referred to Daley as "the Gophers' war time gift to their football foes." Daley scored two touchdowns, returned a punt for 37 yards to set up Hirsch's second touchdown, and kicked two extra points. After five games, Daley was the leading rusher in college football with 620 rushing yards on 98 carries.

Minnesota's only touchdown was set up by an interception of a pass thrown by Jack Wink. The interception was returned to Michigan's 15-yard line, and Frank Loren scored the touchdown late in the second quarter. Bob Wiese blocked Minnesota's extra point kick. In the fourth quarter, Wink threw a 51-yard touchdown pass to Farnham Johnson. Bob Nussbaumer also scored a touchdown for Michigan. Merv Pregulman added four extra points. Michigan dominated the game with 230 rushing yards and 128 passing yards, while holding Minnesota to 60 rushing yards and 14 passing yards.

Michigan's starting lineup against Minnesota was Rudy Smeja (left end), Bob Hanzlik (left tackle), John Gallagher (left guard), Fred Negus (center), George Kraeger (right guard), Merv Pregulman (right tackle), Hank Olshanski (right end), Bob Wiese (quarterback), Elroy Hirsch (left halfback), Paul White (right halfback), and Bill Daley (fullback). Players appearing in the game as substitutes for Michigan were Jack Petoskey, Farnham Johnson, Bob Rennebohm, Vincent Mroz, Fenwick Crane, Clifton Myll, and Art Renner (ends); Robert Derleth, John Greene, Robert Kennedy, Fred Bryan and Leonard Naab (tackles); Rex Wells and Robert Fischer (guards); John Crandell (center); and Jack Wink, Hugh Mack, Joe Ponsetto, Jim Aliber, Wally Dreyer, Bob Nussbaumer, Earl Maves, Howard Wikel, James Brown and Bob Stenberg (backs).

=== Week 6: at Illinois ===
Week 6: Michigan at Illinois

Team	1	2	3	4	Total
• Michigan	14	7	7	14	42
Illinois	0	0	6	0	6

- Date: October 30, 1943
- Location: Memorial Stadium, Champaign, Illinois
- Game attendance: 13,500

On October 30, 1943, Michigan played the Illinois Fighting Illini at Champaign, Illinois. Michigan won the game by a score of 42 to 6. Bill Daley and Elroy Hirsch, known as Michigan's "lend-lease backs", each scored two touchdowns and were the stars of the game for Michigan. Daley also kicked an extra point for Michigan to bring his point total in the game to 13 points. Daley rushed for 197 yards on 22 carries against the Illini. Hirsch was described as being "the outstanding defensive player of the afternoon, being the only Wolverine who seemed able to stop" Illinois' backs. As a team, the Wolverines totaled 453 rushing yards against the Illini.

The Illinois game was the last of the 1943 season for Bill Daley and Merv Pregulman, both of whom were named All-Americans at the end of the season. Both had been ordered to report to the Norfolk Naval Training Station. In six games for Michigan during the 1943 season, Daley gained 817 rushing yards on 120 carries, and led the team with 51 points scored. Multiple players from Midwestern teams were ordered to report for duty on November 1, 1943 (including Notre Dame's Heisman Trophy winner Angelo Bertelli and Tony Butkovich and Alex Agase of Purdue), leading Wilfrid Smith in the Chicago Daily Tribune to refer to the date as "Blue Monday."

Bob Wiese also scored a touchdown for Michigan on "a 6-yard spinner play" in the fourth quarter. Bob Nussbaumer scored Michigan's final touchdown on a run from the one-yard line. Merv Pregulman appeared in his final college football game, converting on five extra point kicks. Michigan outgained Illinois by a total of 473 yards to 206.

Michigan's starting lineup against Illinois was Jack Petoskey (left end), Bob Hanzlik (left tackle), John Gallagher (left guard), Fred Negus (center), George Kraeger (right guard), Merv Pregulman (right tackle), Rudy Smeja (right end), Bob Wiese (quarterback), Elroy Hirsch (left halfback), Wally Dreyer (right halfback), and Bill Daley (fullback).

=== Week 7: Indiana ===
Week 7: Indiana at Michigan

Team	1	2	3	4	Total
Indiana	0	0	6	0	6
• Michigan	7	7	2	7	23

- Date: November 6, 1943
- Location: Michigan Stadium, Ann Arbor, Michigan
- Game attendance: 20,000
- Referee: James Masker (Northwestern)

On November 6, 1943, Michigan defeated the Indiana Hoosiers by a score of 23 to 6 in front of a crowd of 20,000 at Michigan Stadium. With Paul White, Bill Daley and Merv Pregulman lost to military service, Michigan was required to substantially revamp its lineup. Bob Wiese moved from quarterback to fullback, Jack Wink became the starting quarterback, and Robert Derleth took over Pregulman's spot at right tackle. The game began with cool, cloudy conditions and ended in "a steady drizzle."

Bob Wiese and Elroy Hirsch starred for Michigan. Wiese led the team with 100 yards on 18 carries. Hirsh ran for a touchdown in the first quarter and threw a 43-yard touchdown pass (35 yards in the air) to Wally Dreyer in the second quarter. The Wolverines held Indiana's highly-touted quarterback Bobby Hoernschemeyer to four completions out of 16 passes, intercepted four of his passes, and forced him out of the end zone for a safety as he attempted to pass in the third quarter. Explaining Hoernscemeyer's difficulties, the Chicago Daily Tribune noted that "the Hoosier backfield seemed swarming with Michigan men." Indiana's sole score came on an eight-yard touchdown pass in the third quarter from Hoernschemeyr to Pete Pihos. Indiana's touchdown was set up when Indiana intercepted a Bob Nussbaumer lateral and returned it 48 yards to Michigan's seven-yard line. Rudy Smeja intercepted a Hoernschemeyer pass in the fourth quarter and returned it 38 yards for a touchdown. Rex Wells, a V-12 Marine transfer who had been captain of the 1942 Idaho Southern team, took over Pregulman's place-kicking duties and converted three extra point kicks for Michigan. Michigan outgained the Hoosiers by 269 to 124 rushing yards.

Michigan's starting lineup against Indiana was Rudy Smeja (left end), Bob Hanzlik (left tackle), John Gallagher (left guard), Fred Negus (center), George Kraeger (right guard), Robert Derleth (right tackle), Bob Rennebohm (right end), Jack Wink (quarterback), Elroy Hirsch (left halfback), Wally Dreyer (right halfback), and Bob Wiese (fullback). Players appearing in the game as substitutes for Michigan were Hank Olshanski, Farnham Johnson, and Vincent Mroz (ends); Clem Bauman (tackle); Rex Wells (guard); Don Lund (quarterback); Bob Nussbaumer, Howard Wikel, and Earl Maves (halfback).

=== Week 8: Wisconsin ===
Week 8: Wisconsin at Michigan

Team	1	2	3	4	Total
Wisconsin	0	0	0	0	0
• Michigan	7	13	0	7	27

- Date: November 13, 1943
- Location: Michigan Stadium, Ann Arbor, Michigan
- Game attendance: 15,000
- Referee: William A. Blake (Loras)

On November 13, 1943, Michigan defeated the Wisconsin Badgers by a score of 27 to 0 in front of a crowd of 15,000 spectators at Michigan Stadium. Through the 1943 season, the Wolverines had relied on halfback Elroy Hirsch, a star for Wisconsin in 1942. Hirsch was sidelined for most of the game with a shoulder injury, but a total of ten former Badgers played for Michigan in the game, including center Fred Negus, quarterback Jack Wink, halfback Wally Dreyer, guard Johnny Gallagher, tackle Bob Hanzlik, and ends Hank Olshanski and Earl Maves. Lacking a Navy or Marine training program on its campus, Wisconsin had lost most of its best football players after the 1942 season, with the majority being transferred to Michigan. On the day before the game, Detroit sports writer Watson Spoelstra joked, "Shed a tear, friend, for [Wisconsin coach] Harry Stuhldreher who, in effect, will field two football teams here tomorrow, one for Wisconsin and one for Michigan." A Chicago sportswriter added that the only way Stuhldrher's team could win the game was "on a common and simple legal process -- a writ of replevin."

After Bob Wiese scored a touchdown in the first quarter, coach Fritz Crisler "dug deep into his reserve ranks" and played the final three quarters with second and third stringers. Bob Nussbaumer accounted for two touchdowns for Michigan, a 19-yard touchdown run in the second quarter and a 34-yard touchdown pass to Maves in the fourth quarter. Backup halfback Howard Wikel also scored a touchdown in the second quarter. Hirsch appeared briefly in the game to convert an extra point kick. Rex Wells converted two of his three extra point kicks. Michigan dominated Wisconsin on the ground by a total of 294 rushing yards to 67.

Michigan's starting lineup against Wisconsin was Rudy Smeja (left end), Bob Hanzlik (left tackle), John Gallagher (left guard), Fred Negus (center), Rex Wells (right guard), Robert Derleth (right tackle), Art Renner (right end), Jack Wink (quarterback), Bob Nussbaumer (left halfback), Wally Dreyer (right halfback), and Bob Wiese (fullback). Players appearing in the game as substitutes for Michigan were Hank Olshanski, Farnham Johnson, Bob Rennebohm, Vincent Mroz, Fenwick Crane, Bruce Hilkene, and Thomas Cook (ends); John Greene, Fred Bryan, Clem Bauman, Robert Oren, and Arthur Leroux (tackle); Clifton Myll, William Sigler, Ray Sturges, and Jack Trump (guards); Frank Kern and Harold Watts (centers); Don Lund, Joe Ponsetto, Jim Aliber, Earl Maves, Howard Wikel, Elroy Hirsch, Jerome Powers and George Welch (backs).

=== Week 9: Ohio State ===
Week 9: Ohio State at Michigan

Team	1	2	3	4	Total
Ohio State	0	0	7	0	7
• Michigan	13	0	13	19	45

- Date: November 20, 1943
- Location: Michigan Stadium, Ann Arbor, Michigan
- Game attendance: 45,000
- Referee: R. W. Huegel (Marquette)

Michigan concluded the 1943 season with its annual rivalry game against Ohio State. The game matched Hall of Fame coaches Fritz Crisler of Michigan and Paul Brown of Ohio State. Since Brown took over as head coach in 1941, the Buckeyes were undefeated against Michigan, playing to a tie in 1941 and defeating the Wolverines in 1942. The Wolverines scored seven touchdowns and defeated the Buckeyes 45 to 7 in front of a crowd of 45,000 at Michigan Stadium. The margin of victory was the largest in the series since Michigan's 86-0 victory over Ohio State in 1902.

Michigan threatened early after Rudy Smeja recovered an Ohio State fumble on the Buckeyes' 14-yard line, but the Wolverines were unable to score. On the next drive, Michigan drove 60 yards for a touchdown, culminating with a screen pass from Jack Wink to Bob Wiese and a three-yard touchdown run by Wiese. When the Buckeyes took over, they faked a punt on fourth down, failed to convert, and Michigan took over at the Ohio State 41-yard line. Wiese carried the ball seven times on the drive, and Wally Dreyer scored on a lateral after a fake by Wiese. Michigan did not score in the second quarter and led 13-0 at the half.

Early in the third quarter, a punt by Wiese was blocked, and Ohio State took over at Michigan's 48-yard line. Ohio State's freshman halfback Ernie Parks gained 36 yards on a reverse around the left end and scored to cut Michigan's lead to 13-7. Michigan responded with 32 unanswered points. The Wolverines' second half scoring began with a 59-yard drive that featured a 23-yard run by Earl Maves and ended with a four-yard touchdown run by Wiese. Late in the third quarter, the Wolverines sustained a 57-yard scoring drive that ended with Wiese faking the run, handing off to Jack Wink, and Wink then lateraling the ball to Bob Nussbaumer who ran 31 yards on a sweep around the left end for a touchdown. On the first drive of the fourth quarter, Parks fumbled for Ohio State and Hank Olshanski recovered the ball on Ohio State's 45-yard line. With the ball on the 33-yard line, Wink threw a touchdown pass to Vincent Mroz. Trailing 26-7, Ohio State again ran a fake punt on fourth down, and Michigan took over at the Buckeyes' 23-yard line. Earl Maves scored on a reverse. Michigan's final touchdown followed an interception by Maves at the Ohio State 40-yard line. Joe Ponsetto caught a pass for a 20-yard gain, and Don Lund ran 20 yards for the touchdown.

Quarterback Bob Wiese was the star of the game for Michigan, rushing for 138 yards and two touchdowns on 30 carries. Elroy Hirsch appeared in the game only to attempt extra point kicks, converting on only one of three attempts. Rex Wells converted two extra point kicks. Michigan dominated Ohio State on the ground, totaling 436 rushing yards to only 112 for Ohio State. The Wolverines also limited Ohio State to three pass completions for 27 yards and intercepted three Ohio State passes.

Michigan's starting lineup against Ohio State was Rudy Smeja (left end), Bob Hanzlik (left tackle), John Gallagher (left guard), Fred Negus (center), Rex Wells (right guard), Robert Derleth (right tackle), Art Renner (right end), Bob Wiese (quarterback), Bob Nussbaumer (left halfback), Wally Dreyer (right halfback), and Don Lund (fullback). Players appearing in the game as substitutes for Michigan were Hank Olshanski, Farnham Johnson, Vincent Mroz, Bob Rennebohm, Fenwick Crane, Thomas Cooke, Bruce Hilkene (ends); John Greene, Fred Bryan, and Robert Kennedy (tackles); George Kraeger, Clifton Myll, William Sigler, Ray Sturges, and Jack Trump (guards); Frank Kern (center); and Earl Maves, Elroy Hirsch, Howard Wikel, Jerome Powers, Jack Wink, Joe Ponsetto, and Jim Aliber (backs).

=== Postseason ===
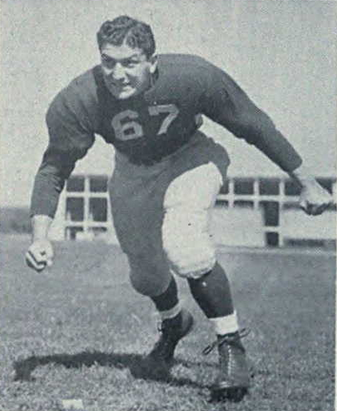
1943 All-American Merv Pregulman

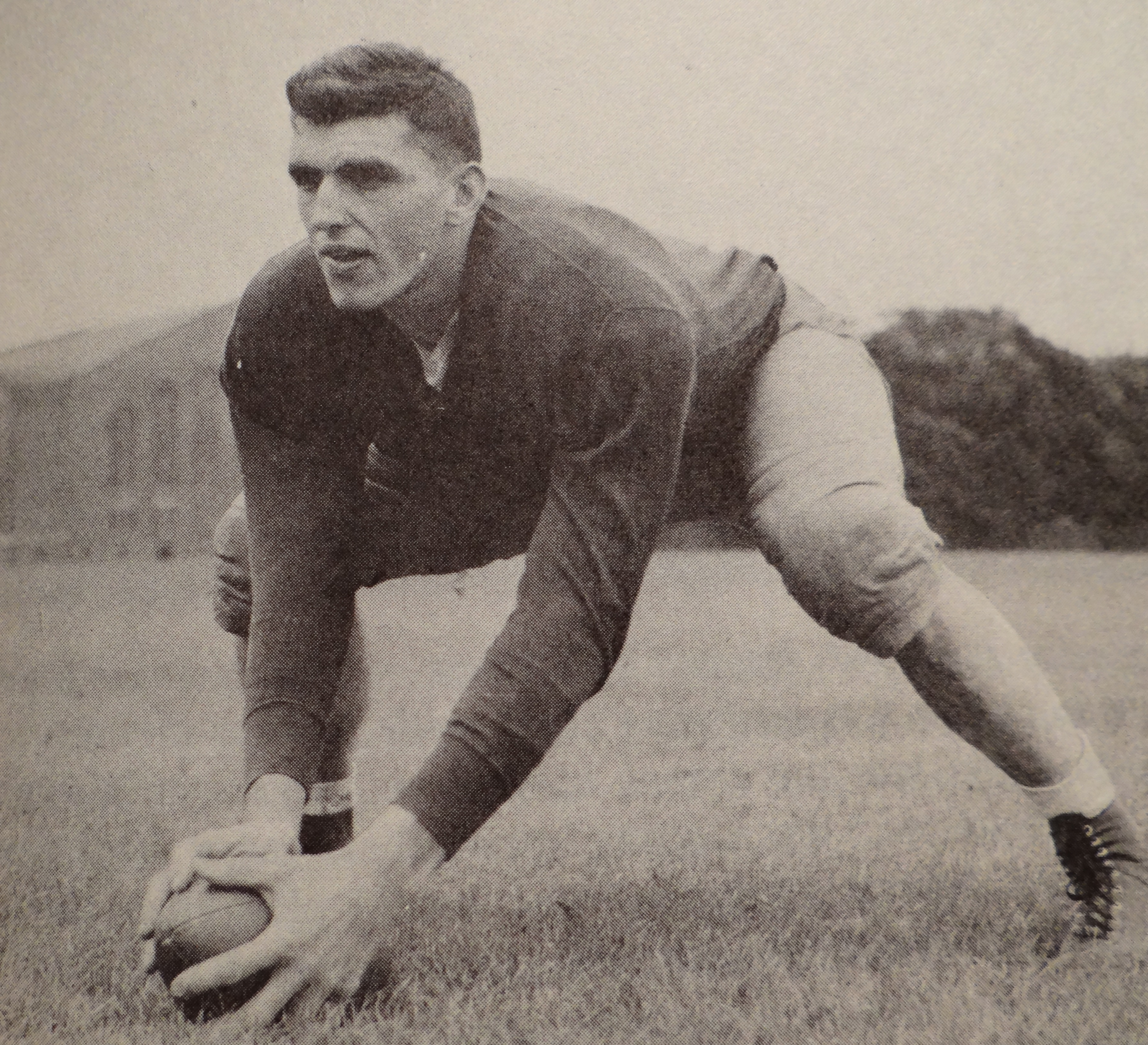
All-Western Conference center Fred Negus

The 1943 Michigan football team tied with Purdue for the Western Conference championship, the Wolverines' first conference championship since the undefeated 1933 Michigan team won both the conference and national championships. It was also the first time since 1932 that Michigan had gone undefeated and untied against conference opponents. In the final AP Poll, Notre Dame was selected as the #1 team in the country followed by Iowa Pre-Flight at #2 and Michigan at #3. Two other Western Conference teams finished in the top ten: Purdue at #5 and Northwestern at #9.

On November 24, 1943, the team chose Bob Wiese, a junior from Jamestown, North Dakota, as the squad's most valuable player. They also elected him as the team captain of the 1944 team. Wiese also finished in a tie for second place (behind Otto Graham) in the voting for the Chicago Tribune Silver Football trophy, awarded each year to the most valuable player in the Western Conference.

Despite missing the final three games, fullback Bill Daley finished seventh in the voting for the 1943 Heisman Trophy with 71 points. He was also recognized as a consensus All-American, receiving first-team honors from the Associated Press, the United Press, Collier's Weekly (selected by Grantland Rice), the Central Press Association (selected with the assistance of the nation's football captains), Stars and Stripes, the International News Syndicate, and the New York Sun.

Tackle Merv Pregulman was selected as a first-team All-American by Collier's Weekly, and Stars & Stripes, and as a second-team All-American by the United Press.

For its All-Western Conference team, the Associated Press chose two Michigan players, Bill Daley and center Fred Negus.

The war time exploits of Tom Harmon continued to draw national press coverage during the 1943 season and into the post-season. After crashing in the jungle in Brazil in April, Harmon was credited in August 1943 (erroneously according to later accounts) with shooting down a Japanese Zero in an air battle after a bombing raid on a dock area and shipping in Hong Kong. Harmon was again reported missing in action after a combat mission at Jiujiang, China, on October 30, 1943. Harmon shot down two Japanese Zeros, but was shot down behind Japanese lines and bailed out of his P-38 Lightning aircraft as it plummeted to the ground in flames. He was rescued by Chinese guerrillas who led him through hundreds of miles of Japanese-occupied territory. Harmon reported that he had survived on a diet of rice for 32 days.

== Players ==
=== Varsity letter winners ===
- Jim Aliber, quarterback, Detroit, Michigan
- Ralph H. Amstutz, guard, Oak Park, Illinois
- Clement "Clem" Bauman, tackle, Dayton, Ohio
- Fred J. Bryan, tackle, Melvindale, Michigan
- John S. Crandell, center, Ann Arbor, Michigan
- Fenwick J. Crane, end, Pleasant Ridge, Michigan
- Bill Daley, St. Cloud, Minnesota – started the first 6 games of the season at fullback
- Robert Derleth, Marquette, Michigan – started the last 3 games of the season at right tackle (after Merv Pregulman's military transfer)
- Wally Dreyer, Milwaukee, Wisconsin – started the last 4 games of the season at right halfback (after Paul White's military transfer)
- Robert H. Fischer, guard, Benton Harbor, Michigan
- John M. Gallagher, Eau Claire, Wisconsin – started all 9 games, 7 at left guard and 2 at right guard
- John J. Greene, tackle, Pittsburgh, Pennsylvania
- Robert Hanzlik, Chippewa Falls, Wisconsin – started all 9 games at left tackle
- Elroy "Crazylegs" Hirsch, Wausau, Wisconsin – started the first 7 games of the season at left halfback (playing time limited in final 2 games due to a shoulder injury)
- James G. Holgate, Milwaukee, Wisconsin
- Farnham Johnson, end, Appleton, Wisconsin
- Robert W. Kennedy, tackle, Riverside, Illinois
- Frank J. Kern, center, Detroit, Michigan
- George W. Kraeger, Indianapolis, Indiana – started the first 7 games of the season, 5 at right guard, 2 at left guard
- Don Lund, Detroit, Michigan – started 1 game (against Ohio State) at fullback
- Hugh R. Mack, quarterback, Birmingham, Michigan
- Earl Maves, fullback, Stanley, Wisconsin
- Vincent Mroz, end, East Chicago, Indiana
- Clifton O. Myll, end, St. Clair Shores, Michigan
- Leonard G. Naab, tackle, Lansing, Michigan
- Fred Negus, Martins Fall, Ohio – started all 9 games at center
- Bob Nussbaumer, Oak Park, Illinois – started the last 2 games of the season at left halfback (following an injury to Elroy Hirsch)
- Henry S. "Hank" Olshanski, Wausau, Wisconsin – started 1 game (against Minnesota) at right end
- Jack Petoskey, Dearborn, Michigan – started 1 game (against Illinois) at left end
- Joe Ponsetto, quarterback, Flint, Michigan
- Merv Pregulman, Lansing, Michigan – started the first 6 games of the season at right tackle
- Robert B. "Bob" Rennebohm, LaCrosse, Wisconsin – started 1 game (against Indiana) at right end
- Art Renner, Sturgis, Michigan – started 6 games at right end
- William K. Sigler, guard, Toledo, Ohio
- Rudy Smeja, Chicago, Illinois – started all 9 games, 8 at left end and 1 at right end
- Robert P. "Bob" Stenberg, fullback, Milwaukee
- Jack Trump, guard, Battle Creek, Michigan
- Harold Watts, center, Birmingham, Michigan
- Rex C. Wells, Twin Falls, Idaho – started the final 2 games of the season at right guard
- Paul White, River Rouge, Michigan – started 5 games at right halfback
- Bob Wiese, Jamestown, North Dakota – started all 9 games, 7 at quarterback, 2 (against Indiana and Wisconsin) at fullback
- Howard L. Wikel, halfback, Ann Arbor, Michigan
- Jack Wink, Milwaukee, Wisconsin – started 2 games (against Indiana and Wisconsin) at quarterback

=== Non-varsity letter winners ===
- Larry R. Alberti, halfback, Chicago, Illinois
- Jim Brieske, center, Harbor Beach, Michigan
- James J. Brown, halfback, St. Ignace, Michigan
- Thomas C. Cook, end, Detroit, Michigan
- William L. Culligan, halfback, Detroit, Michigan
- Bruce Hilkene, end, Indianapolis, Indiana
- Shelden M. Kavieff, end, Detroit, Michigan
- George C. Kiesel, quarterback, Detroit, Michigan
- Arthur N. Leroux, tackle, Muskegon Heights, Michigan
- Richard E. Manning, guard, Ecorse, Michigan
- Robert A. T. Oren, tackle, Evart, Michigan
- Thomas C. Paton, end, Okemos, Michigan
- Jerome E. Powers, halfback, Green Bay, Wisconsin
- William R. Rohrbach, guard, East Aurora, New York
- Alan E. Schwartz, end, Detroit, Michigan
- Ray E. Sturges, guard, Detroit, Michigan
- George A. Welch, halfback, Pleasant Ridge, Michigan
- Lewis T. Wheeler, tackle, Roosevelt, New York

=== Individual scoring totals ===
Player	Touchdowns	Extra points	Field goals	Points
Bill Daley	8	3	0	51
Elroy Hirsch	8	2	0	50
Bob Nussbaumer	6	0	0	36
Bob Wiese	5	0	0	30
Merv Pregulman	0	21	0	21
Wally Dreyer	3	0	0	18
Earl Maves	2	0	0	12
Art Renner	2	0	0	12
Paul White	2	0	0	12
Art Renner	2	0	0	12
Rex Wells	0	7	0	7
Bill Culligan	1	0	0	6
Farnham Johnson	1	0	0	6
Don Lund	1	0	0	6
Vincent Mroz	1	0	0	6
Rudy Smeja	1	0	0	6
Howard Wikel	1	0	0	6
Robert Stenberg	0	1	0	1
TOTAL	44	34	0	298

== Awards and honors ==
- All-Americans: Bill Daley (AP first team; Collier's first team), Merv Pregulman (Collier's first team; UP second team)
- All-Conference: Fred Negus (AP first team), Bill Daley (AP first team), Bob Wiese (AP second team), Rudy Smeja (AP second team), Merv Pregulman (AP second team), Elroy Hirsch (AP second team), Robert Hanzlik (AP honorable mention), John Gallagher (AP honorable mention), Jack Wink (AP honorable mention)
- Most Valuable Player: Bob Wiese
- Meyer Morton Award: Clem Bauman

== Coaching and training staff ==
- Head coach: Fritz Crisler
- Assistant coaches

- Backfield coach: Earl Martineau
- Line coach: Biggie Munn
- "B" squad: Arthur Valpey and William C. Barclay
- Freshman coach and chief scout: Wally Weber
- Other assistant coaches: Ray Fisher (head baseball coach and asst. football coach), Bennie Oosterbaan (head basketball coach and asst. football coach)

- Trainer: Ray Roberts
- Manager: James D. Kline
