= Fred Negus =

American football player (1923–2005)

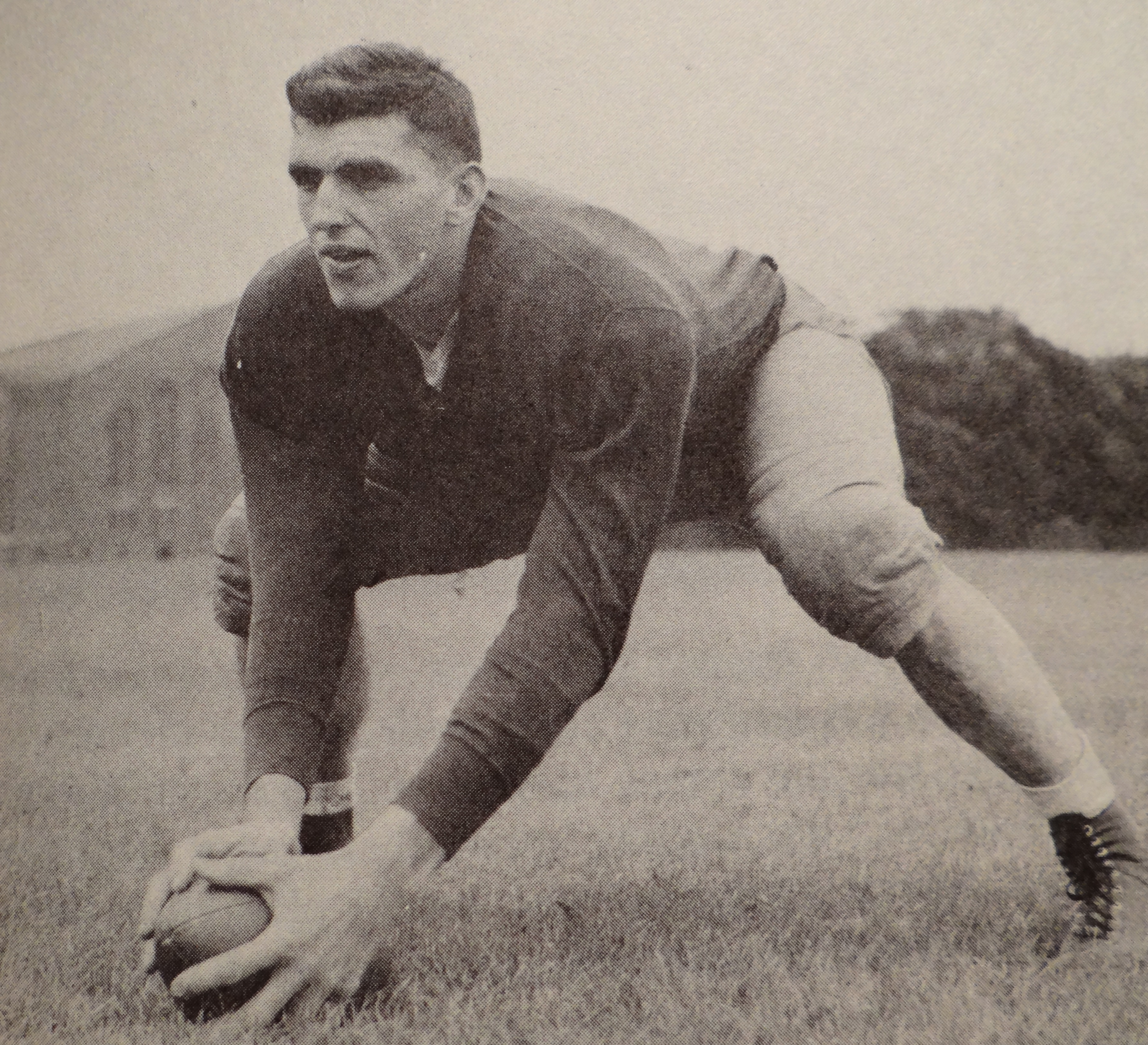
- Negus from 1944 Michiganensian

No. 27, 18
- Positions: Center, linebacker

Personal information
- Born: November 7, 1923; Colerain, Ohio, U.S.
- Died: April 18, 2005 (aged 81); Fort Atkinson, Wisconsin, U.S.
- Listed height: 6 ft 1 in (1.85 m)
- Listed weight: 208 lb (94 kg)

Career information
- High school: Martin Ferry (Martins Ferry, Ohio)
- College: Wisconsin (1942, 1946); Michigan (1943)
- NFL draft: 1945: 7th round, 59th overall pick

Career history
- Chicago Rockets / Hornets (1947-1949); Chicago Bears (1950)

Awards and highlights
- 3× First-team All-Big Ten (1942, 1943, 1946)

Career NFL/AAFC statistics
- Games played: 49
- Games started: 29
- Interceptions: 7
- Stats at Pro Football Reference

Frederick Wilson Negus (November 7, 1923 – April 18, 2005) was an American football player. He played college football for Wisconsin and Michigan and professional football in the All-America Football Conference (AAFC) and the National Football League (NFL).

== College career ==
Negus was born in Colerain, Ohio and began his college football career with the University of Wisconsin. As Wisconsin's starting center in 1942, he was selected as a first-team All-Big Ten Conference player by the Associated Press. He was inducted into the U.S. Navy and was assigned to the V-12 Navy College Training Program at the University of Michigan. While at Michigan, Negus played for Fritz Crisler's 1943 Michigan Wolverines football team; Negus was the starting center on a Michigan team that compiled an 8–1 record, outscored opponents 302–73, and won the Big Ten Conference championship (in a tie with Purdue). Michigan's line coach, Biggie Munn, praised Negus's performance for Michigan: "Negus played a remarkably steady game for us this fall. Last year at Wisconsin he injured his shoulder and had to have an operation. Nine out of ten boys would have quit football at that stage, but Negus didn't."

Negus was one two players from the 1943 Michigan team (the other was Bill Daley) selected by the Associated Press as a first-team All-Big Ten player. He achieved the honor first at Wisconsin in 1942 and repeated the honor at Michigan in 1943. Negus was also one of three Michigan players selected for first-team All-Big Ten honors by the United Press (the other two being Daley and Bob Wiese).

== Military ==
After the 1943 season, Negus was placed on active duty and received his commission as a lieutenant. Negus returned to Wisconsin after completing his military service and was captain of Wisconsin's 1946 football team.

== Professional career ==
Negus also played four years of professional football for the Chicago Rockets/Hornets (1947–1949) and Chicago Bears (1950). He was among the AAFC league leaders in non-offensive touchdowns in both 1948 and 1949 and in interceptions in 1949.
