= 1943 All-Eastern football team =

American all-star college football team

The 1943 All-Eastern football team consists of American football players chosen by various selectors as the best players at each position among the Eastern colleges and universities during the 1943 college football season.

== All-Eastern selections ==
=== Backs ===
- Bob Odell, Penn (AP-1; UP-1)
- Harold Hamberg, Navy (AP-1; UP-1)
- Donald Kasprzak, Dartmouth (AP-1; UP-2)
- Mike Micka, Colgate (AP-1)
- Glenn Davis, Army (AP-3; UP-1)
- George Sutch, Rochester (AP-3; UP-1)
- Ray Scussel, Yale (AP-2; UP-2)
- Albert Postus, Villanova (AP-2; UP-2)
- Hillis Hume, Navy (AP-2; UP-2)
- Stan Kozlowski, Holy Cross (AP-2)
- Don Savage, Brown (AP-3)
- Norman Lynch, Coast Guard (AP-3)

=== Ends ===
- John F. Monahan, Dartmouth (AP-1; UP-2)
- Albert Channell, Navy (AP-1)
- Paul Walker, Yale (AP-3; UP-1)
- Frank Quillen, Penn (UP-1)
- William Iannicelli, Franklin & Mary (AP-2)
- Ed Fiorentino, Brown (AP-2)
- Tom Rock, Columbia (UP-2)
- John J. Hennessey, Army (AP-3)

=== Tackles ===
- Francis E. Merritt, Army (AP-1; UP-2)
- George Connor, Holy Cross (AP-1)
- Don Whitmire, Navy (AP-2; UP-1)
- Cleo Calcagni, Cornell (AP-2; UP-1)
- Herb Nelson, Penn (UP-2)
- Ed Sprinkle, Navy (AP-3)
- Bernard Gallagher, Princeton (AP-3)

=== Guards ===
- John Jaffurs, Penn State (AP-1; UP-1)
- George Brown, Navy (AP-1; UP-2)
- Donald Alvarez, Dartmouth (AP-3; UP-1)
- E. J. Jones, Franklin & Marshall (AP-2)
- Macauley Whiting, Yale (AP-2)
- Edward Murphy, Army (UP-2)
- Ben Chase, Navy (AP-3)

=== Centers ===
- Cas Myslinski, Army (AP-1; UP-1)
- Jack Martin, Navy (AP-2; UP-2)
- George Titus, Holy Cross (AP-3)

== Key ==
- AP = Associated Press
- UP = United Press

== See also ==
- 1943 College Football All-America Team
