= Maves (surname) =

Maves is a surname. Notable people with the surname include:

- Bart Maves (born 1964), Canadian politician
- Earl Maves (1923–1952), American football player
