= 1943 All-America college football team =

Official list of the best college football players of 1943

The 1943 All-America college football team is composed of college football players who were selected as All-Americans by various organizations and writers that chose All-America college football teams in 1943. The eight selectors recognized by the NCAA as "official" for the 1943 season are (1) Collier's Weekly, as selected by Grantland Rice, (2) the Associated Press, (3) the United Press, (4) the All-America Board, (5) Football News, (6) the International News Service (INS), (7) Look magazine, and (8) the Sporting News.

== Consensus All-Americans ==
For the year 1943, the NCAA recognizes eight published All-American teams as "official" designations for purposes of its consensus determinations. The following chart identifies the NCAA-recognized consensus All-Americans and displays which first-team designations they received.

Name	Position	School	Number	Official selectors	Other selectors
Cas Myslinski	Center	Army	8/8	AAB, AP, CO, FN, INS, LK, SN, UP	CP, SS
Bill Daley	Halfback	Michigan	8/8	AAB, AP, CO, FN, INS, LK, SN, UP	CP, NYS, SS
Creighton Miller	Halfback	Notre Dame	7/8	AAB, AP, CO, FN, INS, SN, UP	--
Angelo Bertelli	Quarterback	Notre Dame	7/8	AAB, CO, FN, INS, LK, SN, UP	CP, NYS, SS
Ralph Heywood	End	USC	6/8	AAB, AP, FN, INS, LK, UP	CP, SS
Jim White	Tackle	Notre Dame	6/8	AAB, AP, CO, INS, SN, UP	CP
Alex Agase	Guard	Purdue	6/8	AAB, FN, INS, LK, SN, UP	CP
Bob Odell	Halfback	Penn	5/8	AP, CO, INS, LK, NYS	--
Don Whitmire	Tackle	Navy	4/8	AAB, INS, LK, UP	CP
Merv Pregulman	Tackle	Michigan	4/8	CO, FN, LK, SN	SS
Pat Filley	Guard	Notre Dame	4/8	CO, FN, SN, UP	--
John Yonakor	End	Notre Dame	3/8	INS, SN, UP	CP

== All-American selections for 1943 ==
=== Ends ===
- Ralph Heywood, USC (AAB; AP-1; FN; INS-1; LK; UP-1; CP-1; SS-1)
- John Yonakor, Notre Dame (AAB; UP-1; INS-1; SN; CP-1)
- Pete Pihos, Indiana (College and Pro Football Hall of Fame) (AAB; AP-3; SN; UP-2; CO-1; NYS-1)
- Albert Channell, Navy (AP-3; FN; LK)
- John Monahan, Dartmouth (AP-2; NYS-1)
- Roe Johnston, Navy (SS-1)
- Herb Hein, Northwestern (CO-1)
- Joe Parker, Texas (AP-1)
- Robert Hall, Colorado College (AP-2)
- Bob Gantt, Duke (UP-2)

=== Tackles ===
- Don Whitmire, Navy (College Football Hall of Fame) (AAB; INS-1; LK; UP-1; CP-1)
- Jim White, Notre Dame (AAB; AP-1; CO-1; INS-1; SN; UP-1; CP-1)
- Merv Pregulman, Michigan (AP-3; CO-1 [g]; FN; LK; SN; UP-2; SS-1)
- Art McCaffray, College of the Pacific (UP-2; CO-1; NYS-1)
- George Connor, Holy Cross (AP-2; NYS-1)
- Ralph Calcagni, Cornell (SS-1)
- Pat Preston, Duke (AP-1)
- Francis Merritt, Army (College Football Hall of Fame) (AP-2; FN)
- Solon Burnett, Southwestern (Texas) (AP-3)

=== Guards ===
- Alex Agase, Purdue (College Football Hall of Fame) (AAB; AP-3; FN; INS-1; LK; SN; UP-1; CP-1)
- Pat Filley, Notre Dame (AP-2; CO-1; FN; SN; UP-1)
- John Steber, Georgia Tech. (AAB; AP-1 [tackle]; UP-2; INS-1; NYS-1)
- Bill Milner, Duke (SS-1; CP-1)
- Harold Fisher, Southwestern (LK)
- Bill Milner, Duke (NYS-1)
- Don Alvarez, Dartmouth (SS-1)
- George Brown, Navy (AP-1)
- John Jaffurs, Penn State (AP-2; UP-2)
- Richard Ward, Washington (AP-3)

=== Centers ===
- Cas Myslinski, Army (AAB; AP-1; CO-1; FN; INS-1; LK; SN; UP-1; CP-1; SS-1)
- Jack Martin, Navy (NYS-1)
- Bill Gray, USC (AP-2)
- Herbert Coleman, Notre Dame (UP-2)
- Lester Gatewood, Tulane (AP-3)

=== Quarterbacks ===
- Angelo Bertelli, Notre Dame (College Football Hall of Fame) (AAB; AP-2; CO-1; FN; INS-1; LK; SN; UP-1; CP-1; NYS-1; SS-1)
- Otto Graham, Northwestern (AAB [hb]; AP-1; FN; UP-2; CP-1)

=== Halfbacks ===
- Bill Daley, Michigan (AAB [fb]; AP-1; CO-1 [fb]; FN; INS-1; LK; SN; UP-1; CP-1; NYS-1; SS-1)
- Bob Odell, Penn (College Football Hall of Fame) (AP-1; UP-2; CO-1; INS-1; LK; NYS-1)
- Creighton Miller, Notre Dame (College Football Hall of Fame) (AAB; AP-1; CO-1; FN; INS-1; SN; UP-1)
- Eddie Prokop, Georgia Tech (AP-2; UP-2)
- Alvin Dark, Southwestern Louisiana (AP-2)
- Harold Hamburg, Navy (UP-2)
- Steve Van Buren, LSU (AP-3)
- Robert Hoernschemeyer, Indiana (AP-3)
- Bob Steuber, DePauw (AP-3)

=== Fullbacks ===
- John Podesto, College of the Pacific (AP-3; LK; SS-1 [halfback]; NYS-1)
- Tony Butkovich, Purdue (killed on Okinawa, World War II) (AP-2; SN; UP-1; CP-1; SS-1)

== Key ==
Bold = Consensus All-American

- -1 – First-team selection
- -2 – Second-team selection
- -3 – Third-team selection

=== Official selectors ===
- AAB = All-America Board
- AP = Associated Press
- CO = Collier's Weekly, selected by Grantland Rice
- FN = Football News
- INS = International News Service
- LK = NBC radio and Look magazine, selected under the supervision of Bill Stern, by 138 sports announcers and 25 key sports writers
- SN = Sporting News, selected through a poll of 86 sports writers in 40 states
- UP = United Press

=== Other selectors ===
- CP = Central Press Association, selected with the assistance of the nation's football captains
- MS = Maxwell Stiles, noted California sports writer, based on the number of weeks a player was named player of the week at his position
- NYS = New York Sun
- SS = Stars and Stripes, selected by the sports writers for the Army publication
- WC = Walter Camp Football Foundation

== See also ==
- 1943 All-Big Six Conference football team
- 1943 All-Big Ten Conference football team
- 1943 All-Pacific Coast Conference football team
- 1943 All-SEC football team
