= Stephen Alemais =

American baseball player (born 1995)

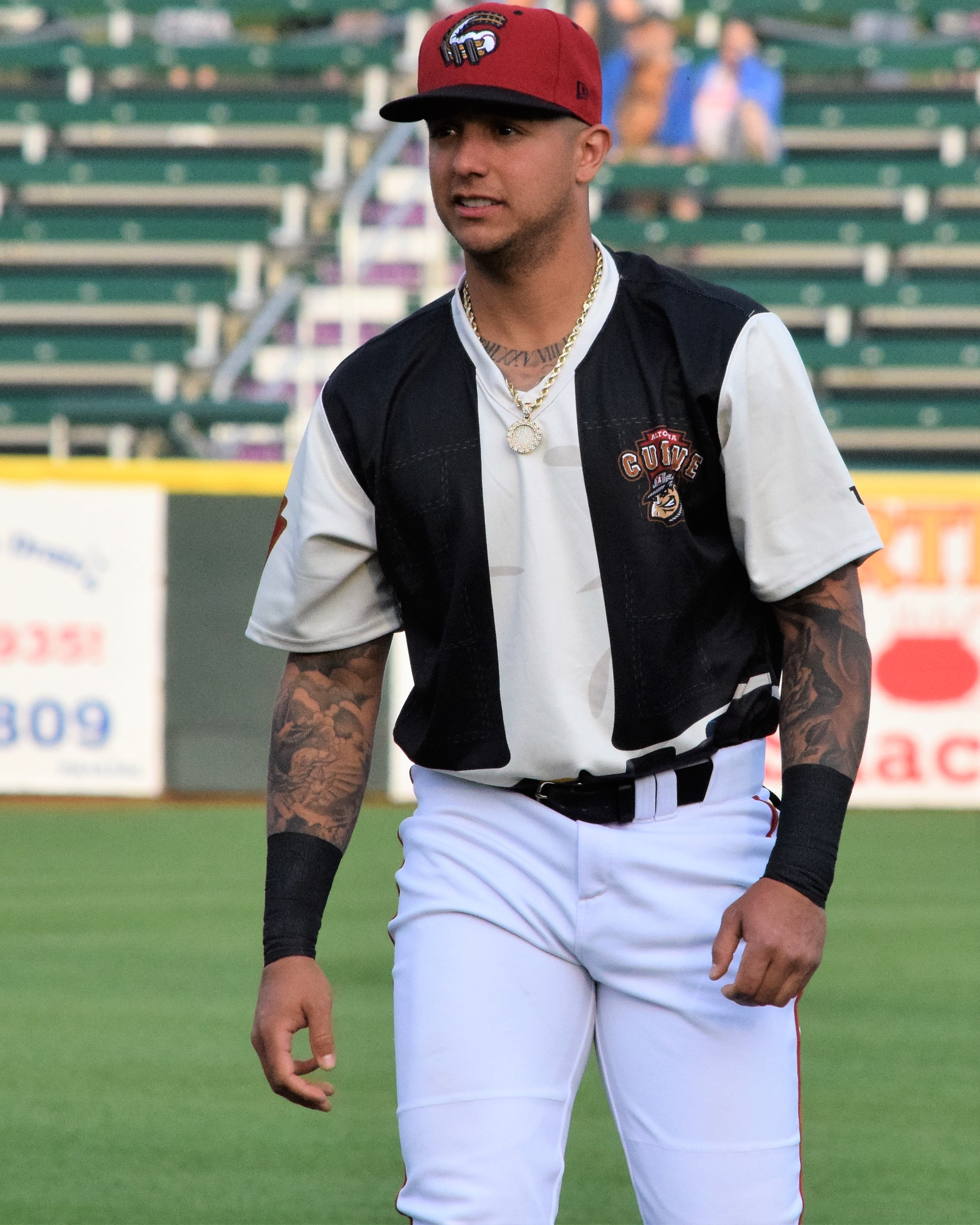
- Alemais with the Altoona Curve in 2018
- Shortstop / Second baseman
- Born: April 12, 1995 (age 31); New York City, New York, U.S.
- Bats: Right Throws: Right

Stephen Gavin Alemais (born April 12, 1995) is an American former professional baseball shortstop. He played college baseball for three seasons with the Tulane Green Wave, and was drafted in the third round of the 2016 MLB draft by the Pittsburgh Pirates. Alemais played four seasons in the Pittsburgh minor league system and earned attention for his defensive skills. However, he was released in 2022 after undergoing multiple shoulder surgeries.

== Early life and amateur career ==
Alemais was born in the Bronx, New York to Ernies Alemais and Joan Salcedo. His father was a building maintenance worker, but left his job to open a sports complex with batting cages due to his son's interest and talent in baseball. Stephen began his high school career at All Hallows High School. However, he tore the labrum in his left shoulder on a swing at a high fastball during his junior season, which led him to transfer to the Elev/8 Sports Institute in Florida for his senior year. Alemais earned all-state honors in his junior and senior seasons, and all-district, all-city, and all-league honors as a sophomore, junior, and senior. He currently holds the All Hallows High School single season hit record.

Undrafted out of high school in the 2013 MLB draft, Alemais enrolled at Tulane University to play for the Green Wave. He began the 2014 season as the team's starting shortstop and leadoff hitter, and initially performed well. However, midseason struggles in the plate and in the field spurred interim coach Jake Gautreau to bench Alemais for several games. The shortstop's play improved after he was reinserted into the starting lineup. He finished the season batting .241 with one home run and 19 RBI, and led the Green Wave with 11 stolen bases and two triples.

Alemais improved in his sophomore season, batting .312 with 22 RBI and a team-leading 27 stolen bases, which garnered him a spot on the American Athletic Conference All-Second Team and helped Tulane make the NCAA Division I Baseball Championship for the first time since 2008. In the summer of 2015, Alemais played collegiate summer baseball with the Cotuit Kettleers of the Cape Cod Baseball League.

In 2016, his junior year at Tulane, Alemais slashed .311/.368/.401 with one home run, 28 RBIs, and 19 stolen bases in 53 games, earning American Athletic Conference First Team honors. He led the team in batting average, stolen bases, and tied for first in doubles, and a double play he turned against LSU was featured as a highlight on SportsCenter. After the season, he was selected in the third round of the 2016 Major League Baseball draft by the Pittsburgh Pirates with the 105th overall pick.

== Professional career ==
=== Pittsburgh Pirates organization ===
Alemais signed with Pittsburgh and made his professional debut with the West Virginia Black Bears. He missed time at the start of the season due to a sprained wrist. On July 16, a double play he turned was ranked seventh on SportsCenter's Top Ten Plays. Alemais was promoted to the Single-A West Virginia Power in August. In 50 games split between the Power and the Low-A West Virginia Black Bears, he hit .249 with one home run and twenty RBI. In 2017, he played for the Power and the High-A Bradenton Marauders, and made a rehab appearance with the Gulf Coast League Pirates. In 67 total games, Alemais batted .265 with four home runs and 34 RBI.

In 2018, Alemais played for the Double-A Altoona Curve, where he was primarily a second baseman for the first time in his career. He produced a slash line of .279/.347/.346 with one home run, 34 RBI, and 16 stolen bases in 120 games.

Alemais began the 2019 season with Altoona, but tore his labrum on a slide after 12 games, necessitating season-ending surgery. He underwent a fourth shoulder surgery in February 2021, after sustaining an injury while playing defense for Leones del Escogido.

Alemais was released by the Pirates organization on March 25, 2022.

=== Staten Island FerryHawks ===
On June 11, 2022, Alemais signed with the Staten Island FerryHawks of the Atlantic League of Professional Baseball. He played in 9 games, hitting .320/.414/.360 with one RBI and 7 stolen bases.

On February 14, 2024, after a year of inactivity, Alemais re–signed with Staten Island. In five games for the FerryHawks, he went 2–for–20 (.100) with one RBI and one stolen base. Alemais was released by Staten Island on May 10.

On May 31, 2024, Alemais announced his retirement from professional baseball.

== Personal life ==
Alemais has multiple tattoos, the first of which he got when he was 17. His family is of Dominican origin, and the first language Alemais learned was Spanish. His grandfather Felipe is a friend of Robinson Cano's grandfather. Alemais has one younger brother.
