= Herb Nelson =

American football player (1921–2004)

Profile
- Positions: End, tackle

Personal information
- Born: April 25, 1921; Hartford, Connecticut, U.S.
- Died: July 18, 2004 (aged 83); Westwood, Massachusetts, U.S.
- Listed height: 6 ft 4 in (1.93 m)
- Listed weight: 219 lb (99 kg)

Career information
- High school: Hall High School
- College: Penn

Career history
- Buffalo Bisons (1946); Brooklyn Dodgers (1947-1948)

Awards and highlights
- Second-team All-Eastern (1943)
- Stats at Pro Football Reference

Herbert Russell Nelson (April 25, 1921 – July 18, 2004) was an American football end and tackle.

Nelson was born in Hartford, Connecticut, in 1921 and attended William Hall High School. He played college football for Penn.

He played professional football in the All-America Football Conference (AAFC) for the Buffalo Bisons in 1946 and the Brooklyn Dodgers in 1947 and 1948. In three seasons of professional football, Nelson appeared in 30 games, 12 as a starter, and caught six passes for 64 yards and two touchdowns.

Nelson died in 2004 in Westwood, Massachusetts.
