= George Brown (American football, died 2008) =

American football player (1923–2008)

Profile
- Position: Guard

Personal information
- Born: May 15, 1923; San Diego, California, U.S.
- Died: September 12, 2008 (aged 85)
- Listed height: 6 ft 3 in (1.91 m)
- Listed weight: 210 lb (95 kg)

Career information
- High school: Hoover High School (San Diego, California)
- College: Navy (1942–1943); San Diego State (1947)

Career history
- Richmond Rebels (1948); Wilmington Clippers (1948)

Awards and highlights
- First-team All-American (1943); First-team All-Eastern (1943)
- College Football Hall of Fame

George Cummings Brown Jr. (May 15, 1923 – September 12, 2008) was an American football player. He played college football as a guard at the United States Naval Academy and San Diego State College—now known as San Diego State University. He was inducted into the College Football Hall of Fame in 1985.

Brown also competed for the Navy Midshipmen track and field team as a shot putter. During World War II, he served in the United States Navy on submarines and aboard the USS Indianapolis. He later became a physician, and had a medical practice in El Cajon, California.
