= Pat Filley =

American football player, coach and university administrator

- Filley as a wrestler, 1939

Biographical details
- Born: June 26, 1922; South Bend, Indiana, U.S.
- Died: April 13, 2000 (aged 77); Winter Garden, Florida, U.S.

Playing career

Football
- 1942–1944: Notre Dame
- Position: Guard

Accomplishments and honors

Championships
- National (1943)

Awards
- Consensus All-American (1943); Second-team All-American (1944)

Patrick J. Filley (June 26, 1922 – April 13, 2000) was an American college football player, coach, and university administrator.

Filley was born in 1922 in South Bend, Indiana. His father E. J. Filley was an Indiana native and a laborer. His mother Rose (McHugh) Filley was also an Indiana native and a housewife. He grew up in South Bend and attended that city's Central High School, playing football and competing as a middleweight for the wrestling team.

In the fall of 1940, Filley enrolled at Notre Dame University. In his four years as a football player at Notre Dame, the Irish lost only five games. Filley was twice selected captain of the Notre Dame football team, including the 1943 national championship team. He was a consensus All-American at the guard position in 1943.

Filley was hired as an assistant coach at Cornell University in March 1945. He served for 29 years as a coach and administrator at Cornell, He was first hired as the freshman team football coach. In 1955, he became an administrator, having responsibility over the years as assistant to the athletic director, ticket manager, athletic business manager, associate director of athletics in charge of operations, and associate athletic director in charge of scheduling. He was inducted into the Cornell Athletic Hall of Fame in 1988.

Filley died in Winter Garden, Florida, in 2000 at age 77.
