= Paul White (American football, born 1921) =

American football player and coach (1921–1974)

No. 42
- Positions: Halfback, defensive back

Personal information
- Born: November 13, 1921; Wadley, Georgia, U.S.
- Died: June 3, 1974 (aged 52); Duluth, Georgia, U.S.
- Listed height: 6 ft 1 in (1.85 m)
- Listed weight: 183 lb (83 kg)

Career information
- College: Michigan
- NFL draft: 1944: 11th round, 101st overall pick

Career history
- Pittsburgh Steelers (1947)

Career NFL statistics
- Rushing yards: 85
- Rushing average: 3.9
- Receptions: 2
- Receiving yards: 55
- Total touchdowns: 1
- Stats at Pro Football Reference

Paul Grover White (November 13, 1921 – June 3, 1974) was an American professional football player and coach. He played college football as a halfback for Fritz Crisler's University of Michigan Wolverines football teams in 1941, 1942, 1943, and 1946 — missing the 1944 and 1945 seasons due to military service. He served as the captain of the 1943 Michigan team that compiled a record of 8–1 (6–0 Big Ten) and finished the season ranked No. 3 in the AP Poll. In 1944, he received Michigan's Big Ten Medal of Honor as the who had best demonstrated proficiency in scholarship and athletics. He also played professional football for the Pittsburgh Steelers in 1947. He played in 11 games for the Steelers, gaining 240 all-purpose yards and scoring one touchdown. His longest run in the NFL was good for a 52-yard gain. In 1949, he served as the backfield coach at Hillsdale College. In March 1950, he was hired as the backfield coach at the University of Connecticut.
