= All Hallows High School =

Former private co-ed Catholic high school in the Bronx, New York, United States

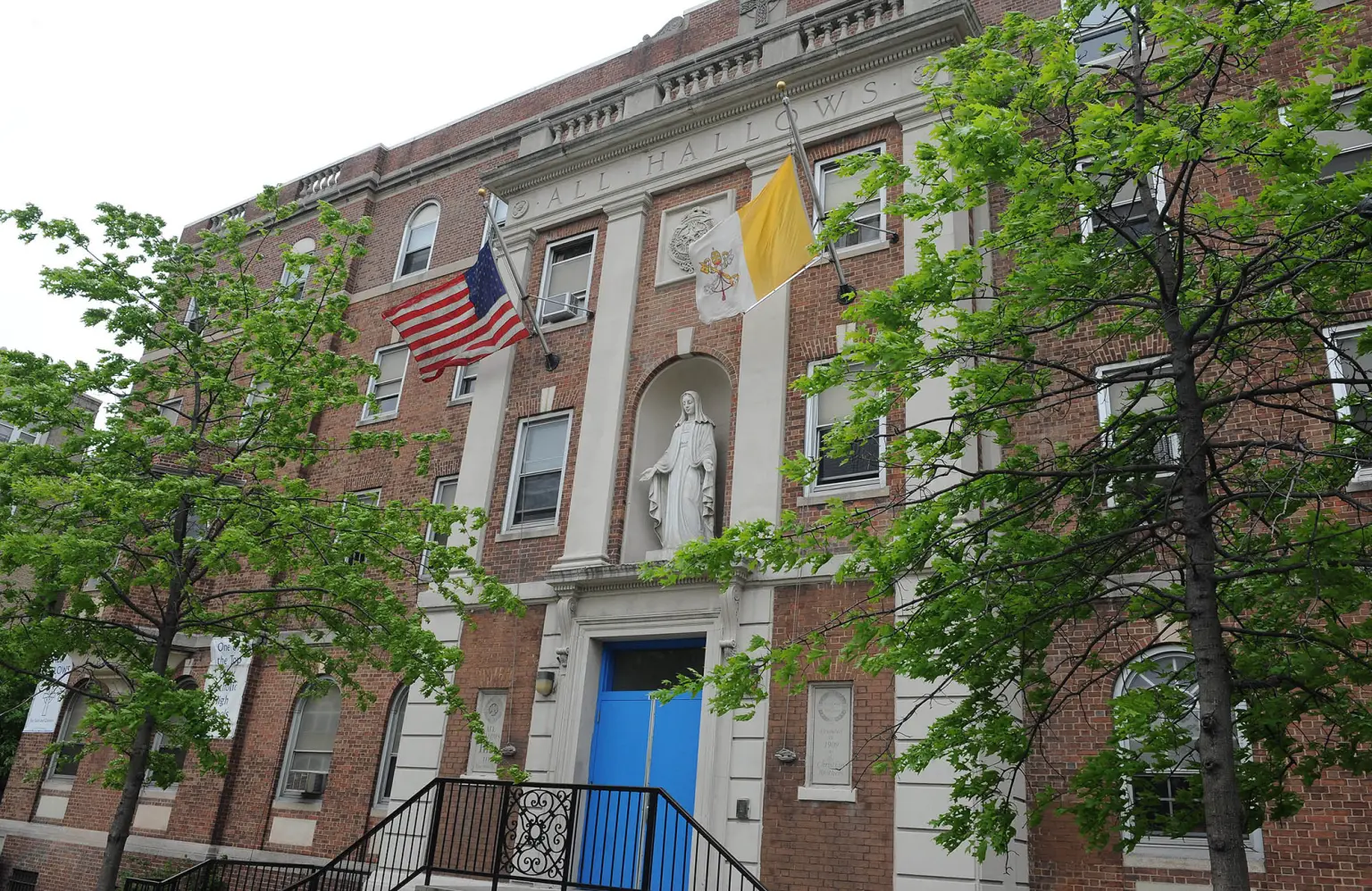
- The front entrance of All Hallows HS before its closure. (2024)

Location
- 111 East 164th Street; Bronx, New York 10452; United States; 40°49′48″N 73°55′18.5″W

Information
- Former name: All Hallows Institute
- Type: Private, All-Male, Coeducational (2024-2025)
- Motto: Pro Fide et Patria (For Faith and Country)
- Religious affiliation: Roman Catholic
- Established: 1909 (117 years ago)
- Founder: Br. Joseph I. Doorley, C.F.C.
- Status: Defunct
- Closed: June 2025
- Oversight: Congregation of Christian Brothers
- President: Ronald Schutte
- Principal: Nicholas Corrado
- Teaching staff: 35.0 (on an FTE basis)
- Grades: 9–12
- Student to teacher ratio: 14.6
- Colors: Navy Blue and White
- Athletics conference: Catholic High School Athletic Association
- Mascot: The Gael
- Team name: Gaels
- Rival: Cardinal Hayes High School
- Accreditation: Middle States Association of Colleges and Schools
- Newspaper: The Blue and White
- Yearbook: The Halloween
- Tuition: $7,200
- TACHS code: 111
- Website: allhallows.org (no longer in-service)

All Hallows High School was a Catholic co-educational (formerly all-boys) high school in the South Bronx, New York, United States. Located at 111 East 164th Street, near Yankee Stadium, the school had an enrollment of approximately 400 boys and girls, 99% of whom were persons of color.

Despite sitting in the poorest Congressional district in the country, All Hallows routinely placed its entire graduating class in four-year colleges. The Wall Street Journal has called the school's success in this area "stunning". The Acton Institute had named All Hallows as one of the top-50 Catholic high schools in the United States for nine consecutive years. It was the only city school in the Archdiocese of New York to have earned this distinction.

All Hallows High School would officially shutdown on June 30, 2025 due to a severe budget deficit.

== History and philosophy ==
All Hallows was founded in 1909 by the Congregation of Christian Brothers at the invitation and with the help of Monsignor James Power, pastor of All Saints Church. The order founded the school upon the principles of Blessed Edmund Rice, which center on providing moral and scholastic training, especially to the children of the poor. The first staff included the Superior Brother P. J. Ryan, and Brothers J.A. Kelly, M.S. Curtis, and P.G. Molloy. Originally located at 13-15 West 124th in Manhattan, the school moved to its current location in 1929. The school has more than 10,000 graduates.

All Hallows was the first school founded by the Christian Brothers in the United States.

For much of its history, All Hallows was an elementary school as well as a high school, but it has been exclusively the latter since 1977.

The American Eagle at the center of the All Hallows seal represents the All Hallows Community's commitment to the United States. The wreath of laurel surrounding the seal refers to victory and achievement in both athletics and scholastics. The circle surrounding the eagle serves a reminder of the school's "continuing faith" and the four corners of the seal are represented by the Gaelic symbol for the continuation of life. The Latin phrase Pro fide et patria means For faith and country.

All Hallows celebrated its centennial in 2009 and was honored with its own street name change to All Hallows Way as a parting gift from the Class of 2012. The school was also visited by Mary McAleese, the former president of Ireland, during the 2012–2013 school year.

All Hallows would eventually go co-ed for the first time in its 116-year history during the 2024-2025 school year, welcoming female students for the first time. This was done to allow female students from Saint Barnabas High School to transfer to All Hallows after its closure, and it is where most of the students would transfer.

All Hallows would then close shortly after going co-educational on June 30, 2025 due to a severe budget deficit that had been reported at $1.7 million in early 2025 with projections to exceed $2 million by next year. It also didn't help how it cost about $11,000 to educate each student when the tuition cost was only $7,200 alongside its decreasing enrollment. The building itself also required systemic habilation costing millions of dollars which it could not afford.

== Sports and activities ==
All Hallows students participated in more than 40 sports and activities; these included the All Hallows Players (the Drama Club, noted for its Shakespeare productions), the newspaper (The Blue and White), the chess team, Big Brothers, as well as "El Club Latino". Students also have various opportunities to join clubs such as student government, the Sports Bowl, the Montefiore Medical Center Program, and intramural sports (football, dodge ball, basketball, etc.).

All Hallows has a much decorated history with athletic awards all across the senior hallway and the lobby. The more recent string of accomplishments began in Spring 2006, when the varsity baseball team won a Catholic High School Athletic Association (CHSAA) championship, and, in Winter 2007, when the Freshmen basketball team also won a CHSAA championship. The All Hallows junior varsity bowling team won the CHSAA division championship in 2011 for the second straight year. All Hallows has twice been the Bronx champions on the televised team academic game show "The Challenge" on MSG Varsity (2009 and 2012).

The teams are called The Gaels, although the mascot-emblem looks more like a leprechaun wielding a shillelagh.

== The All Hallows Foundation ==
In 1997, graduates of the school set up The All Hallows Foundation, a 501(C)(3) organized for the purpose of supporting the school and the surrounding neighborhood. The board of directors for the All Hallows Foundation is composed primarily of All Hallows graduates who have achieved notable success in fields such as finance, technology, law, and television.

The Foundation provides funds for a scholarship fund that allows talented, but impoverished young men to attend All Hallows. It also supports facility renovations and improvements, a faculty endowment and community outreach programs. Philip J. Eagan, the board chairman of the All Hallows Foundation applies his background in finance to bring "a bold, entrepreneurial, and creative approach to inner city education."

In December 2006, the Foundation received an anonymously donated check for $2 million. The donation was made by a graduate of the school.

== Demographics ==
Year	Enrollment	Students of color	Religious Employees	Lay Employees	Total Employees
1937	322	0%	15	7	22
1946	754	0%	20	6	26
1950	908*	>1%	26	13	39
1985	470	80%	18	21	39
2003	400	n/a	n/a	n/a	n/a
2015	610	98%	2	53	55

*Estimate

== Notable alumni ==
- Stephen Alemais, professional baseball player
- Bobby Cremins, longtime NCAA men's basketball head coach (Appalachian State, Georgia Tech, College of Charleston)
- Jack Curran, winningest high school baseball and basketball coach in United States history
- James B. Donovan, lawyer and negotiator involved in the 1960 U-2 incident
- Dan Dorion, professional hockey player
- Lawrence P. Flynn, Adjutant General of New York
- James Norwood, professional baseball player
- Olden Polynice, professional basketball player
- Shawnelle Scott, professional basketball player
- RaShawn Stores, college basketball coach for Manhattan College
- Chris Suero, professional baseball player
- Tommy Whelan, professional football player
- Jim White, professional football player
