= Frank Quillen =

American football player (1920–1990)

Profile
- Position: End

Personal information
- Born: December 18, 1920; Ridley Park, Pennsylvania, U.S.
- Died: September 21, 1990 (aged 69); Hockessin, Delaware, U.S.
- Listed height: 6 ft 5 in (1.96 m)
- Listed weight: 225 lb (102 kg)

Career information
- College: Penn

Career history
- Chicago Rockets (1946-1947); Baltimore Colts (1948)*
- * Offseason or practice squad member only

Awards and highlights
- First-team All-Eastern (1943)
- Stats at Pro Football Reference

Frank Harris Quillen (December 18, 1920 – September 21, 1990) was an American football end. He played college football at Penn from 1940 to 1943, military service football for the 1945 El Toro Flying Marines football team, and professional football in the All-America Football Conference for the Chicago Rockets.

== Early life ==
Quillen was born in either Ridley Park, Pennsylvania, or Chester, Pennsylvania. He attended Ridley Park High School and the Franklin & Marshall Academy in Lancaster, Pennsylvania. While in high school, he set state records in the shot put and discus and also played for the football, track and basketball teams.

== College and military ==
Quillen played college football for the Penn Quakers from 1940 to 1943. He participated in the Navy V-5 flight preparatory program during his time at Penn. He was selected as a first-team end on the 1943 All-Eastern football team.

During World War II, he served as a pilot in the United States Marine Corps. He attained the rank of second lieutenant. He played for the 1945 El Toro Flying Marines football team that compiled an 8–2 record.

== Professional football ==
Dick Hanley coached the El Toro team and became the head coach of the Chicago Rockets of the All-America Football Conference in 1946. Quillen joined Hanley in Chicago. Quillen played for the Rockets in 1946 and 1947. He sought to join the Washington Redskins in 1947, but there was a "carry over" clause that gave the Rockets the right to retain him. In two years with Chicago, he appeared in 20 games, six as a starter, and caught 20 passes for 256 yards and three touchdowns.

In August 1948, Quillen was obtained on waivers by the Baltimore Colts. He did not play for the Colts during the regular season.

== Later life ==
After retiring from football, Quillen worked for 40 years with Chester Mack Sales & Services in Delaware. He and his wife, Ealeanor Burk Quillen, had a daughter, Cindy Rosenberg. He died in Hockessin, Delaware, in 1990.
