= Jim White (New York Giants) =

American football player (1920–1987)

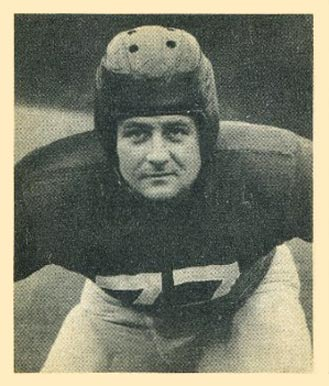
- White on a 1948 Bowman football card

No. 77
- Position: Tackle

Personal information
- Born: February 8, 1920; Edgewater, New Jersey, U.S.
- Died: April 5, 1987 (aged 67); Dumont, New Jersey, U.S.
- Listed height: 6 ft 2 in (1.88 m)
- Listed weight: 227 lb (103 kg)

Career information
- High school: All Hallows (New York City)
- College: Notre Dame

Career history
- New York Giants (1946–1950)

Awards and highlights
- First-team All-Pro (1946); Second-team All-Pro (1947); National champion (1943); Consensus All-American (1943)
- Stats at Pro Football Reference

James Joseph William White (February 8, 1920 – April 5, 1987) was an American professional football tackle who played five seasons with the New York Giants of the National Football League (NFL). He played college football at the University of Notre Dame.

== Early life and college ==
James Joseph William White was born on February 8, 1920, in Edgewater, New Jersey. He played high school football at All Hallows High School in the Bronx.

White played college football for the Notre Dame Fighting Irish of the University of Notre Dame. He was a consensus All-American and national champion during his final season with Notre Dame in 1943. He also finished ninth in Heisman Trophy voting in 1943. White's football career was interrupted by a stint in the United States Navy during World War II.

== Professional career ==
White signed with the New York Giants in 1946 and played in 11 games, starting ten, for the team during the 1946 season, recording one fumble recovery. He also started one playoff game that season. For the 1946 season, he was named first-team All-NFL by the United Press, New York Daily News, and Chicago Herald-American, and second-team All-NFL by the Associated Press and Pro Football Illustrated. He appeared in 11 games, starting nine, for the Giants in 1947, totaling one interception and one fumble recovery that he returned 26 yards for a touchdown. White also earned United Press second-team All-NFL honors in 1947. White played in 11 games, starting six, the following year in 1948. He appeared in 11 games, starting ten, during the 1949 season, recovering one fumble. He played in 11 games, starting seven, in 1950 and made one fumble recovery. He became a free agent after the 1950 season.

== Legacy ==
White died on April 5, 1987, in Dumont, New Jersey.

In his autobiography, NFL Hall of Famer Art Donovan had the following high praise for White: "Little did I think I would eventually become during my high-school years the best defensive lineman to come out of New York City. And if I do say so myself, I think I became the second-best football player to ever come out of the Bronx. The best was a guy I played against named Jim White, an end, a tackle, a fullback, an all-everything for All Hallows High School. He went to Notre Dame. Then he played for the Giants. And if he never quite lived up to expectations in the pros, I'd still have to say he was the best goddamn high-school athlete I've ever seen, a tough, dirty sonofabitch. But good."
