= Francis E. Merritt =

American football player (1920–1995)

Profile
- Position: Tackle

Personal information
- Born: July 20, 1920; New York, New York, U.S.
- Died: March 21, 1995 (aged 74); Clearwater, Florida, U.S.

Career information
- College: Army

Career history
- 1942–1943: Army

Awards and highlights
- First-team All-American (1943); Second-team All-American (1942); First-team All-Eastern (1943)
- College Football Hall of Fame

Francis E. Merritt (July 20, 1920 – March 21, 1995) was an American football tackle who played college football at the United States Military Academy. He was elected to the College Football Hall of Fame in 1996. He served as the athletic director at the United States Air Force Academy from 1967 to 1974.

A 1939 graduate, Merritt played prep football at St. Cecilia High School in Englewood, New Jersey, where he was captain of the state champion team.
