= Jack Wink =

American football player and coach (1922–1995)

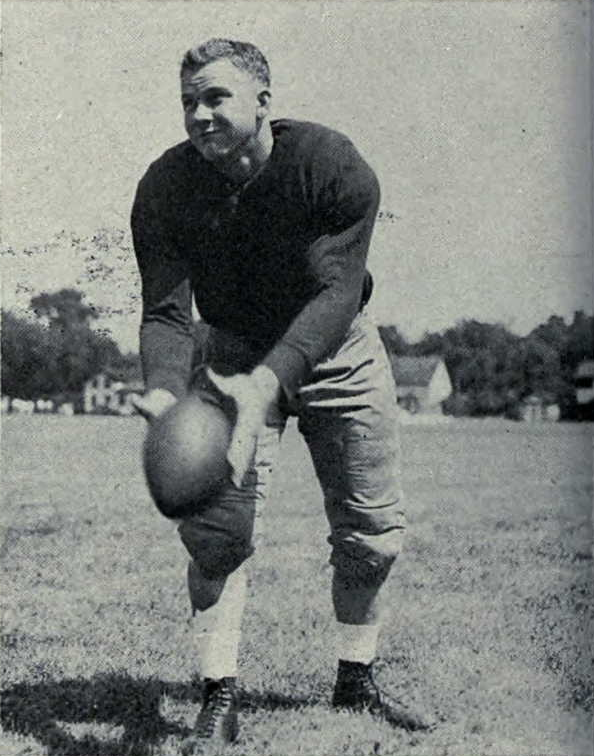
- Wink from 1944 Michiganensian

Biographical details
- Born: August 3, 1922; Milwaukee, Wisconsin, U.S.
- Died: September 16, 1995 (aged 73); St. Cloud, Minnesota, U.S.

Playing career

Football
- 1942: Wisconsin
- 1943: Michigan
- 1946–1947: Wisconsin
- Position: Quarterback

Coaching career (HC unless noted)

Football
- 1948: New London HS (WI)
- 1949–1951: Wayne State (NE)
- 1952–1955: Stout / Stout State
- 1956–1964: St. Cloud State

Ice hockey
- 1956–1968: St. Cloud State

Baseball
- 1953–1956: Stout Institute / Stout State

Head coaching record
- Overall: 54–73–7 (college football); 69–69–2 (college ice hockey); 13–25 (college baseball

Accomplishments and honors

Championships
- Football; 1 NCC (1949)

Awards
- Second-team All-Big Ten (1943)

Jack S. Wink (August 3, 1922 – September 16, 1995) was an American football player and coach. He played college football at the University of Wisconsin–Madison (1942, 1946–1947) and University of Michigan (1943). He served in the United States Marine Corps during both World War II and the Korean War. He later served as a teacher and coach at Wayne State College, University of Wisconsin–Stout, and St. Cloud State University.

== Early years ==
Wink was born in 1922 in Milwaukee, Wisconsin. He was the son of Elmer and Jane (Florscyzk) Wink. His father was a city fireman. Wink attended Milwaukee Boys Tech High School.

== Playing career ==
Wink attended the University of Wisconsin and played quarterback for the 1942 Wisconsin Badgers football team. The following season, he played at the University of Michigan as a marine trainee. Wink started two games as quarterback for the 1943 Michigan Wolverines. After World War II, he returned to Wisconsin, lettering for the 1946 and 1947 Wisconsin football teams. As a senior in 1947, he was named the team's honorary captain at a postseason banquet.

== Coaching and teaching career ==
Wink served in the United States Marine Corps during World War II from 1943 to 1946 before returning to Wisconsin to complete his master's degree. After graduating from Wisconsin, he served as the head football coach and a physical education teacher at New London High School in New London, Wisconsin during the 1948 season.

In July 1949, Wink was hired as head football coach by Wayne State Teachers College in Wayne, Nebraska. He served as the head football coach at Wayne State from 1949 to 1951, compiling a record of 21–6 with an undefeated 9–0 season and a conference championship in 1949.

In April 1952, Wink was hired as the head football coach at The Stout Institute, now known as the University of Wisconsin–Stout, in Menominee, Wisconsin. He held that position for four years and also coached the baseball team at Stout.

In May 1956, Wink was hired as head football coach by St. Cloud State Teachers College, now known as St. Cloud State University, in St. Cloud, Minnesota. He was the head football coach at St. Cloud for nine years from 1956 to 1964, compiling a record of 25–45–5. Wink also coached the men's ice hockey team at St. Cloud State from 1956 to 1968, tallying a mark of 69–69–2. In April 1968, Wink resigned his coaching position at St. Cloud, though he continued to serve as director of intramural athletics. He also continued until 1984 as an instructor in the department of health, physical education and recreation.

== Family and later years ==
Wink was married to Virginia Warnecke in 1948. They had two daughters, Deborah and Wendy. He died in September 1995.

== Head coaching record ==
=== College football ===
| Year | Team | Overall | Conference | Standing | Bowl/playoffs |
|---|---|---|---|---|---|
Wayne State Wildcats (Nebraska College Conference) (1949–1951)
| 1949 | Wayne State | 9–0 | 8–0 | 1st | |
| 1950 | Wayne State | 6–3 | 5–2 | T–2nd | |
| 1951 | Wayne State | 6–3 | 5–2 | 3rd | |
| Wayne State: | | 21–6 | 18–4 | | |
Stout Institute / Stout State Blue Devils (Wisconsin State College Conference) (1952–1955)
| 1952 | Stout Institute | 3–5 | 2–3 | 6th | |
| 1953 | Stout Institute | 1–7 | 0–5 | T–9th | |
| 1954 | Stout Institute | 2–5–1 | 1–3–1 | 8th | |
| 1955 | Stout State | 2–5–1 | 0–4–1 | T–8th | |
| Stout Institute / Stout State: | | 8–22–2 | 3–15–2 | | |
St. Cloud State Huskies (Minnesota State College Conference / Northern State College Conference/ Northern Intercollegiate Conference) (1956–1964)
| 1956 | St. Cloud State | 6–2–1 | 2–1–1 | 2nd | |
| 1957 | St. Cloud State | 0–7–1 | 0–3–1 | 5th | |
| 1958 | St. Cloud State | 1–6–1 | 0–3–1 | 6th | |
| 1959 | St. Cloud State | 2–6 | 1–4 | 5th | |
| 1960 | St. Cloud State | 3–5 | 2–3 | T–3rd | |
| 1961 | St. Cloud State | 1–6–1 | 0–4–1 | 6th | |
| 1962 | St. Cloud State | 5–3–1 | 2–2–1 | 3rd | |
| 1963 | St. Cloud State | 6–3 | 3–2 | T–3rd | |
| 1964 | St. Cloud State | 1–7 | 0–5 | 6th | |
| St. Cloud State: | | 25–45–5 | 10–27–5 | | |
| Total: | | 54–73–7 | | | |
National championship Conference title Conference division title or championship game berth

=== College ice hockey ===
Record table
| Season | Team | Overall | Conference | Standing | Postseason |
|---|---|---|---|---|---|
St. Cloud State Huskies Independent (1956–1968)
| 1956–57 | St. Cloud State | 5–6–0 | | | |
| 1957–58 | St. Cloud State | 4–5–0 | | | |
| 1958–59 | St. Cloud State | 6–6–0 | | | |
| 1959–60 | St. Cloud State | 11–2–0 | | | |
| 1960–61 | St. Cloud State | 12–1–0 | | | |
| 1961–62 | St. Cloud State | 12–0–0 | | | |
| 1962–63 | St. Cloud State | 5–1–1 | | | |
| 1963–64 | St. Cloud State | 3–2–1 | | | |
| 1964–65 | St. Cloud State | 5–4–0 | | | |
| 1965–66 | St. Cloud State | 4–10–0 | | | |
| 1966–67 | St. Cloud State | 1–14–0 | | | |
| 1967–68 | St. Cloud State | 1–18–0 | | | |
| St. Cloud State: | | 69–69–2 | | | |
| Total: | | 69–69–2 | | | |
