= 1943 All-Big Ten Conference football team =

American college football all-star team

The 1943 All-Big Ten Conference football team consists of American football players selected to the All-Big Ten Conference teams selected by the Associated Press (AP) and United Press (UP) for the 1943 Big Ten Conference football season.

== All Big-Ten selections ==
=== Ends ===
- Herb Hein, Northwestern (AP-1; UP-1)
- Pete Pihos, Indiana (AP-1; UP-1)
- Frank Bauman, Purdue (AP-2; UP-2)
- Rudy Smeja, Michigan (AP-2)
- William Barbour, Iowa (UP-2)

=== Tackles ===
- Paul Mitchell, Minnesota (AP-1; UP-1)
- Bill Willis, Ohio State (AP-1; UP-1)
- Merv Pregulman, Michigan (AP-2; UP-2)
- John Genis, Purdue (UP-2)
- Mike Kasap, Purdue (AP-2)

=== Guards ===
- Dick Barwegan, Purdue (AP-1; UP-1)
- Alex Agase, Purdue (AP-1; UP-1)
- Alex Kapter, Northwestern (AP-2; UP-2)
- J. C. Coffee, Indiana (UP-2)
- Robert Liddy, Iowa (AP-2)

=== Centers ===
- Fred Negus, Michigan (AP-1; UP-1)
- John Tavener, Indiana (AP-2; UP-2)

=== Quarterbacks ===
- Bob Hoernschemeyer, Indiana (AP-1; UP-1 [halfback])
- Bob Wiese, Michigan (AP-2; UP-1)
- Jack Wink, Michigan (UP-2)

=== Halfbacks ===
- Otto Graham, Northwestern (AP-1; UP-1)
- Tony Butkovich, Purdue (AP-1; UP-2 [fullback])
- Elroy Hirsch, Michigan (AP-2; UP-2)
- Ernie Parks, Ohio State (AP-2)
- Eddie Bray, Illinois (UP-2)

=== Fullbacks ===
- Bill Daley, Michigan (AP-1, UP-1)
- Don Buffmire, Northwestern (AP-2)

== Key ==
AP = Associated Press, chosen by conference coaches

UP = United Press

Bold = Consensus first-team selection of both the AP and UP

== See also ==
- 1943 College Football All-America Team
