= Mike Micka =

American football player (1921–1989)

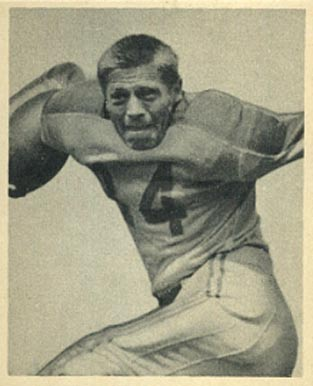
- Micka on a 1948 Bowman football card

No. 34, 14
- Positions: Fullback, defensive back, quarterback

Personal information
- Born: June 18, 1921; Clairton, Pennsylvania, U.S.
- Died: January 4, 1989 (aged 67); Gaithersburg, Maryland, U.S.
- Listed height: 6 ft 0 in (1.83 m)
- Listed weight: 188 lb (85 kg)

Career information
- High school: Clairton
- College: Colgate (1940-1943)
- NFL draft: 1944: 1st round, 8th overall pick

Career history

Playing
- Washington Redskins (1944–1945); Boston Yanks (1945–1948)

Coaching
- Boston Yanks (1948) Backfield coach

Awards and highlights
- First-team All-Eastern (1943)

Career NFL statistics
- Rushing yards: 231
- Rushing average: 3.3
- Receptions: 6
- Receiving yards: 101
- Interceptions: 9
- Total touchdowns: 1
- Stats at Pro Football Reference

Michael Micka (June 18, 1921 – January 4, 1989) was an American professional football fullback in the National Football League (NFL) for the Washington Redskins and the Boston Yanks. He played college football at Colgate University and was drafted in the first round (eighth overall) of the 1944 NFL draft.
