= Tommy Whelan =

American football player (1911–1974)

No. 26
- Position: Tailback / Defensive back

Personal information
- Born: March 4, 1911; New York City, U.S.
- Died: June 24, 1974 (aged 63); Washington, D.C., U.S.
- Listed height: 5 ft 8 in (1.73 m)
- Listed weight: 165 lb (75 kg)

Career information
- High school: All Hallows (New York City)
- College: Catholic (1929–1932)

Career history
- Pittsburgh Pirates (1933)
- Stats at Pro Football Reference

Thomas Joseph Whelan (March 4, 1911 – June 24, 1974) was an American professional football player who played for the Pittsburgh Pirates of the National Football League (NFL). He played college football at The Catholic University of America.

== Early life and college ==
Thomas Joseph Whelan was born on March 4, 1911, in New York City. He attended All Hallows High School in New York City.

Whelan played college football for the Catholic University Cardinals of the Catholic University of America. He was on the freshman team in 1929 and the main roster from 1930 to 1932. He was a two-year letterman from 1931 to 1932.

== Professional career ==
Whelan played in one game for the Pittsburgh Pirates of the National Football League during the team's inaugural 1933 season. He was a member of the independent Staten Island Stapletons during the 1933 season as well. He appeared in three games, starting two, for the Clifton Wessingtons of the Interstate Football League in 1933 also.

== Post-playing career ==
Whelan spent time as the backfield coach at The Catholic University of America. In 1937, he bought a restaurant. He was a head linesman and sideline judge in the All-America Football Conference from 1947 to 1949.

Whelan died on June 24, 1974, in Washington, D.C.
