= Gib Holgate =

American football player, coach, and administrator (1920–2011)

Biographical details
- Born: August 13, 1920; Gary, Indiana, U.S.
- Died: November 7, 2011 (aged 91); Southbury, Connecticut, U.S.

Playing career
- 1943: Michigan
- Position: Halfback

Coaching career (HC unless noted)
- 1947: Michigan (GA)
- 1948: Hillsdale
- 1949–1950: Yale (assistant)
- 1951–1964: Yale (freshmen)

Administrative career (AD unless noted)
- 1961–1967: Yale (assistant AD)
- 1967–1984: Yale (associate AD)

Head coaching record
- Overall: 6–2–1

James Gibson Holgate (August 13, 1920 – November 7, 2011) was an American football player, coach, and college athletics administrator. He served as the head football coach at Hillsdale College in 1948, compiling a record of 6–2–1. Holgate was later an assistant football coach and an administrator in the athletic department at Yale University.

== Early years ==
Holgate was born in Gary, Indiana, in 1920 and spent his youth in Milwaukee, Wisconsin. His father, Clarence G. Holgate, was an engineer with a steel construction company. At the time of the 1930 United States Census, Holgate was living with his parents, four sisters, and a brother in Shorewood, Milwaukee County, Wisconsin. At the time of the 1940 United States Census, Holgate was living in McGill, White Pine County, Nevada, where he was living in a men's dormitory and working as a "surveyor helper" at a copper smelter.

== Wisconsin and Michigan ==
Holgate enrolled at the University of Wisconsin where he played freshman football. After the United States entered World War II, Holgate enlisted in the United States Marine Corps. In 1943, he was transferred to the University of Michigan as part of the V-12 Navy College Training Program. While at Michigan, he played at the halfback position for the 1943 Michigan Wolverines football team that tied for the Big Ten Conference championship and was ranked No. 3 in the final AP Poll.

In October 1943, Holgate and several Michigan players who were part of the V-12 program received orders transferring them to the Marine Corps Recruit Depot Parris Island, effective immediately after the homecoming game against Minnesota on October 23, 1943. Holgate served on an assault transport in the Pacific Theater of Operations and attained the rank of a lieutenant colonel.

In 1946, after concluding his military service, Holgate returned to the University of Michigan where he received both bachelor's and master's degrees. He served as a graduate assistant to Fritz Crisler on the undefeated 1947 Michigan Wolverines football team.

== Coaching/administrative career ==
In 1948, he was hired as the head football coach and athletic director at Hillsdale College. He compiled a 6–2–1 record in his one season as the football coach at Hillsdale.

In March 1949, he was hired as an assistant football coach at Yale University. He became the coach of the freshman football team in 1951. He served as the freshman coach for 14 years, compiling a record of 52–26–7. He became Yale's assistant athletic director in 1961, and associate athletic director in 1967. He was also a fellow at Yale's Morse College. He remained at Yale until 1984. Gibson also served on the executive committee of the New England Athletic Conference and the executive council of the Eastern College Athletic Council (ECAC). He was also the author of "Fundamental Football" published in 1959.

== Family ==
Holgate was married to Marjorie Koch Holgate in approximately 1945. They had three children, Randy Lowe Holgate, Chris Ann Pearce, John Gibson Holgate. Holgate died at age 91 on November 7, 2011, in Southbury, Connecticut.

== Head coaching record ==
Year	Team	Overall	Conference	Standing	Bowl/playoffs
Hillsdale Dales (Michigan Intercollegiate Athletic Association) (1948)
1948	Hillsdale	6–2–1	2–2–1	3rd	
Hillsdale:		6–2–1	2–2–1		
Total:		6–2–1			
