= Cas Myslinski =

American football player and administrator

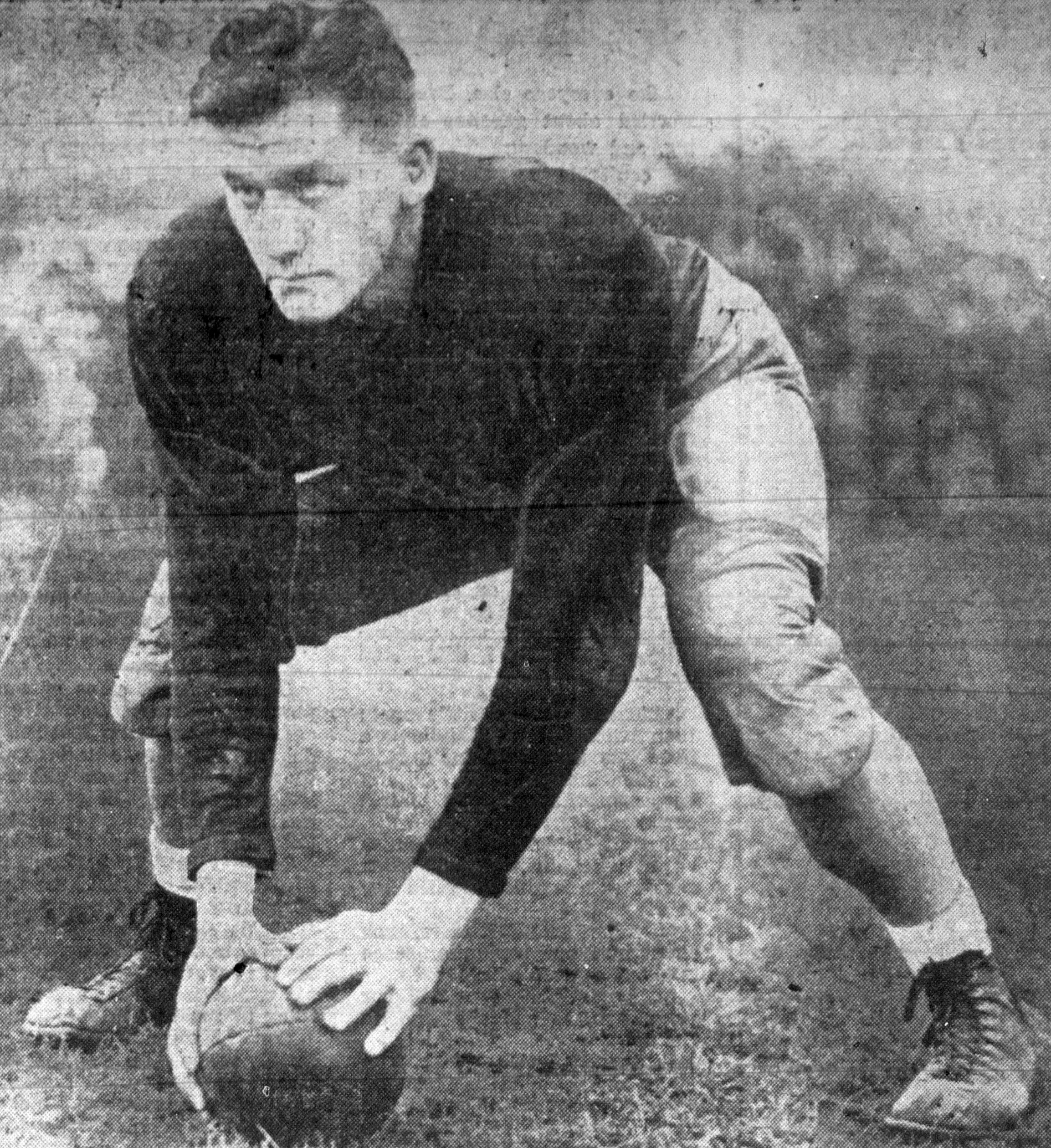
- Myslinski, circa 1942

Biographical details
- Born: March 6, 1920; Steubenville, Ohio, U.S.
- Died: October 26, 1993 (aged 73); South Fayette, Pennsylvania, U.S.

Playing career
- 1941–1943: Army
- Position: Center

Administrative career (AD unless noted)
- 1968–1982: Pittsburgh

Accomplishments and honors

Awards
- Unanimous All-American (1943); Knute Rockne Award; First-team All-Eastern (1943); Army Sports Hall of Fame

Casimir J. Myslinski (March 6, 1920 – October 26, 1993) was an American university administrator, United States Air Force and Army officer, and college football player.

== Early life ==
Myslinski grew up in a poor family of Polish immigrants in Steubenville, Ohio. He was the third child of Felix Myslinski and Stella Dziegelewski. He had seven brothers (Joseph, John, Clement, Thaddaeus, Peter, Paul, and Stanley) and one sister (Helen). After the eighth grade, he spent three years in the work force, including jobs in a steel foundry, selling papers, and in the Civilian Conservation Corps in Utah. Myslinski then belatedly continued his education at Steubenville High School, where he played football three years.

== College and military service ==
Despite scholarship offers from Columbia University and Ohio State University, Myslinski wrote Army head football coach Earl Blaik about attending the United States Military Academy at West Point. Myslinski's father had developed an interest in the military academy as a boy in his native Stawiski, Poland. An Army scout visited Myslinski and reported back to Blaik that he was "a hell of a man with a beautiful pair of legs." The head coach notified Ohio Congressman George H. Bender, who provided Myslinski with an appointment to West Point.

At West Point, he played college football as a center. In 1943, he was a unanimous All-American selection. He graduated from West Point as a member of the Class of 1944.

He was stationed in Texas for training as a pilot for a B-24. While serving as an officer in the United States Army Air Forces, he played football for the Third Air Force team, the "Gremlins". Myslinski had a 22-year career in the Air Force before retiring at the rank of lieutenant colonel.

In 2015, he was inducted into the Army Sports Hall of Fame.

== Pittsburgh ==
The University of Pittsburgh appointed Myslinski as its athletic director on December 24, 1968, and he held that position for fourteen years. The Pittsburgh Press described him as stern and with an ever-present military bearing. It also credited him for overseeing "the return to glory of the football team and the rise to success of the basketball team." He withstood pressure to relocate the football team off-campus to Three Rivers Stadium. Myslinski himself considered his greatest success at Pitt to have been the consolidation of several athletic fundraising groups into one, the Golden Panthers. He retired as Pitt athletic director in April 1982.

He died of heart failure on October 26, 1993, at the Country Meadows Nursing Home in South Fayette, Pennsylvania, at the age of 73.
