= John Jaffurs =

American football player and coach (1923–1996)

No. 60
- Position: Guard

Personal information
- Born: April 15, 1923; Wilkinsburg, Pennsylvania, U.S.
- Died: November 28, 1996 (aged 73); South Park, Pennsylvania, U.S.
- Listed height: 5 ft 10 in (1.78 m)
- Listed weight: 200 lb (91 kg)

Career information
- High school: Wilkinsburg
- College: Penn State
- NFL draft: 1943: 29th round, 280th overall pick

Career history

Playing
- Washington Redskins (1946)

Coaching
- Washington and Lee (1947–1948) (line); Ithaca HS (NY) (head coach) (1949–1954); Cornell (1955–?) (assistant)

Awards and highlights
- Second-team All-American (1943); First-team All-Eastern (1943); Second-team All-Eastern (1942)

Career NFL statistics
- Games played: 8
- Games started: 2
- Fumble recoveries: 1
- Stats at Pro Football Reference

John James Jaffurs III (April 15, 1923 – November 28, 1996) was an American professional football player and coach. He played professionally as a guard in the National Football League (NFL) with the Washington Redskins in 1946. Jaffurs played college football at Pennsylvania State University and was selected in the 29th round of the 1943 NFL draft.

Jaffurs was the oldest of seven children born to Greek immigrants. He grew up in Wilkinsburg, Pennsylvania and graduated from Wilkinsburg High School. During World War II, in the United States Army as a second lieutenant and wounded at the Battle of the Bulge. After playing in the NFL, Jaffurs worked as an assistant football coach at Washington and Lee University in Lexington, Virginia. He later coached at Ithaca High School and Cornell University in Ithaca, New York. Jaffurs died on November 28, 1996, at his home in South Park, Pennsylvania.
