= Bob Nussbaumer =

American football player (1924–1997)

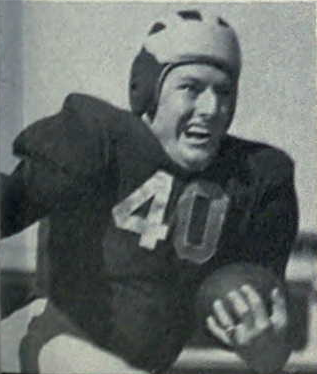
- Nussbaumer from 1946 Michiganensian

No. 48, 50, 98, 99, 23
- Positions: Halfback, end

Personal information
- Born: April 23, 1924; Oak Park, Illinois, U.S.
- Died: July 26, 1997 (aged 73); Moreland Hills, Ohio, U.S.
- Listed height: 5 ft 11 in (1.80 m)
- Listed weight: 172 lb (78 kg)

Career information
- High school: Oak Park
- College: Michigan (1942-1945)
- NFL draft: 1946: 3rd round, 21st overall pick

Career history

Playing
- Green Bay Packers (1946); Washington Redskins (1947–1948); Chicago Cardinals (1949–1950); Green Bay Packers (1951)

Coaching
- Detroit Lions (1957) Offensive ends coach; Detroit Lions (1958–1963) Assistant coach; Detroit Lions (1964) Offensive ends coach; Cleveland Browns (1966–1967) Offensive ends coach; Cleveland Browns (1968–1971) Receivers coach

Career NFL statistics
- Rushing yards: 238
- Rushing average: 2.5
- Receptions: 76
- Receiving yards: 992
- Total touchdowns: 5
- Stats at Pro Football Reference

Robert John "Crow" Nussbaumer (April 23, 1924 – July 26, 1997) was an American professional football halfback and end in the National Football League (NFL) for the Washington Redskins, Green Bay Packers, and the Chicago Cardinals. He played college football at the University of Michigan as a left halfback from 1943 to 1945 and served in the United States Marine Corps in 1945. Nussbaumer was injured during night maneuvers in training at Quantico, however, and was discharged from the military as a result, thus allowing him to resume his collegiate career.

He was drafted in the third round of the 1946 NFL draft. He played in the NFL from 1946 to 1951.

During his playing days he worked as an insurance salesman in the off-season.

After his playing career ended, he served as an assistant coach in the NFL. He coached the defensive backs for the Detroit Lions from 1957 to 1962 prior to being promoted to defensive coordinator in 1963 after Don Shula left to take over as head coach for the Baltimore Colts. After a year off in 1965, Nussbaumer returned to coach defensive backs with the Cleveland Browns from 1966 through 1971.
