= Jack Martin (American football) =

American football player (1922–2008)

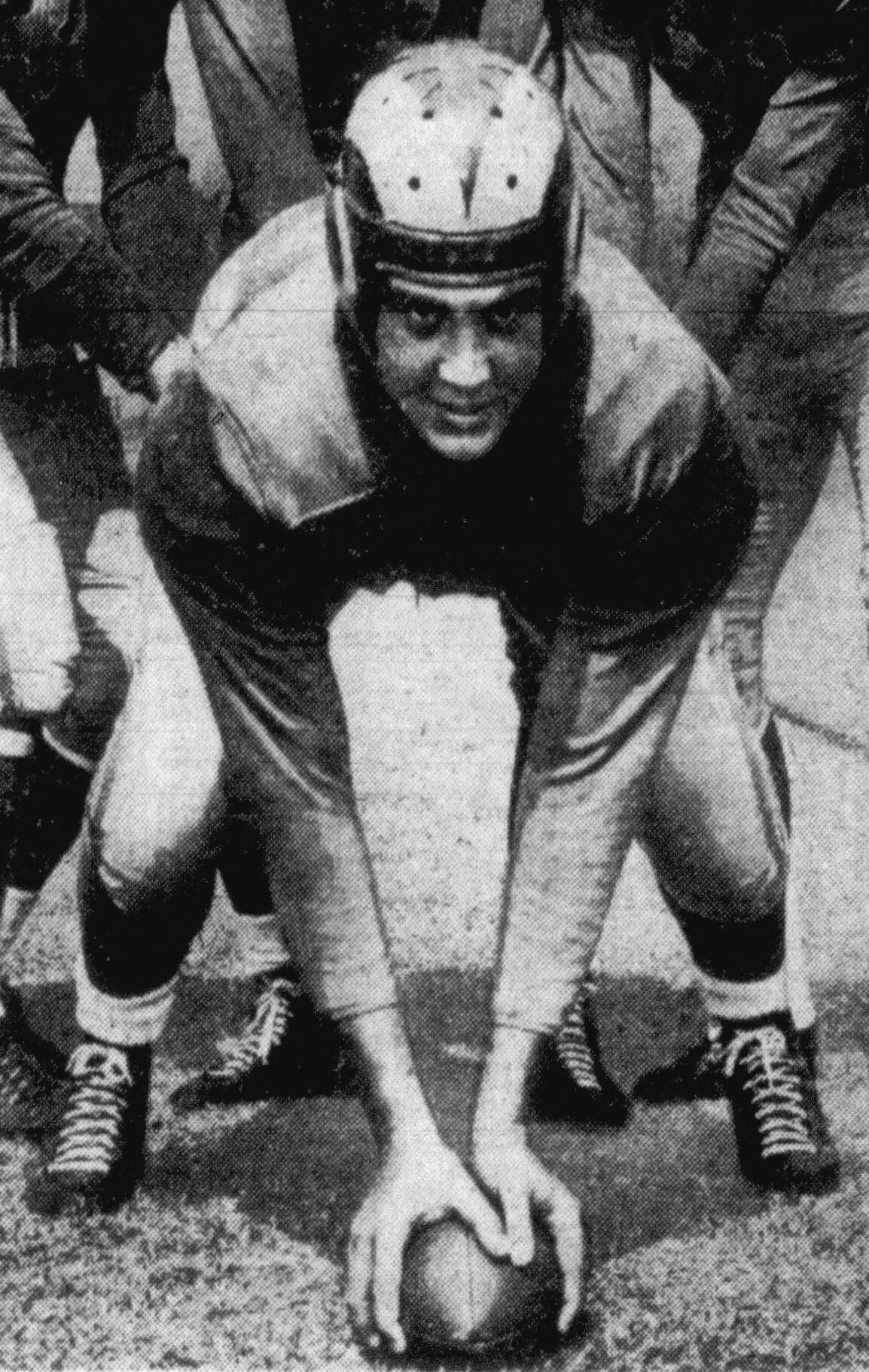
- Martin, circa 1949

Profile
- Positions: Center, linebacker

Personal information
- Born: April 10, 1922; Flint, Michigan, U.S.
- Died: January 8, 2008 (aged 85); California, U.S.
- Listed height: 6 ft 3 in (1.91 m)
- Listed weight: 238 lb (108 kg)

Career information
- College: Princeton (1940–1941), Navy (1943–1944)

Career history
- Los Angeles Rams (1947–1949)

Awards and highlights
- 2× Second-team All-Eastern (1943, 1944)
- Stats at Pro Football Reference

John Taber Martin (April 10, 1922 - January 8, 2008) was an American football player.

Martin was born in 1922 in Flint, Michigan. He moved to Toledo, Ohio, as a boy and attended Point Place High School and later Waite High School. enrolled at Princeton University and played freshman football in 1940, and varsity football as a reserve center for the 1941 Princeton Tigers football team. He was then accepted to the United States Naval Academy where he played for the Navy Midshipmen football teams in 1943 and 1944. He was selected as a second-team center on the 1943 All-Eastern football team, and the second-team center on the 1944 All-America football teams selected by the United Press and The Sporting News. After his time at the Naval Academy, Martin spent two years on active duty with the Navy. In 1946, he played for the Navy's Bainbridge Commodores football team.

After his discharge from the Navy, Martin signed to play professional football for the Los Angeles Rams. He played at the center and linebacker positions for the Rams during the 1947, 1948, and 1949 seasons, appearing in a total of 35 games, 17 of them as a starter. He recovered three fumbles and intercepted one pass. In April 1950, the Rams traded Martin to the Washington Redskins. However, he did not play for the Redskins.

After his football career ended, Martin became a professional negotiator. He married Evelyn Buchele, and they had two sons and a daughter.
