= Rudy Smeja =

American football player (1920–1982)

No. 51, 76, 82
- Position: End

Personal information
- Born: December 1, 1920; Chicago, Illinois, U.S.
- Died: October 31, 1982 (aged 61); Palos Park, Illinois, U.S.
- Listed height: 6 ft 2 in (1.88 m)
- Listed weight: 195 lb (88 kg)

Career information
- College: Michigan
- NFL draft: 1944: 3rd round, 24th overall pick

Career history
- Chicago Bears (1944–1945); Philadelphia Eagles (1946)

Awards and highlights
- Second-team All-Big Ten (1943)

Career NFL statistics
- Receptions: 11
- Receiving yards: 166
- Touchdowns: 1
- Stats at Pro Football Reference

Rudolph M. Smeja (December 1, 1920 – October 1982) was an American professional football player. Smeja played at the end position for the University of Michigan from 1941 to 1943. In November 1943, Smeja intercepted a pass and returned it 35 yards for a touchdown on the first play of the fourth quarter in a 23–6 win over the Indiana Hoosiers. At the end of the 1943 season, Smeja was selected as the starting left end for the Eastern All-Star team to play in the East-West Shrine Game in San Francisco on New Year's Day 1944. He was drafted by the Chicago Bears in the third round (24th overall pick) of the 1944 NFL draft and played 18 games for the Bears in the 1944 and 1945 NFL seasons. In the last game of the 1944 season, Smeja leaped high to spear a touchdown pass from Sid Luckman to help the Bears beat the previously unbeaten Philadelphia Eagles. In 1946, Smeja played for the Philadelphia Eagles. Smeja died in 1982 at age 61.

== Personal life ==
Smeja was of Polish descent.
