= Farnham Johnson =

American football player (1924–2001)

Farnham James Johnson (June 23, 1924 – December 12, 2001) was an American professional football player.

== Biography ==
Johnson was born Farnham James Johnson on June 23, 1924, in Saint Paul, Minnesota. He attended St. Mary Central High School in Neenah, Wisconsin. During World War II, he served with the United States Marine Corps, achieving the rank of first lieutenant. Johnson died on December 12, 2001. He was buried at Corinth National Cemetery.

== Career ==
Farnham played with the Chicago Rockets of the All-America Football Conference in 1948. He played at the collegiate level at the University of Michigan and the University of Wisconsin–Madison.
