= Bill Daley (American football) =

American football player (1919–2015)

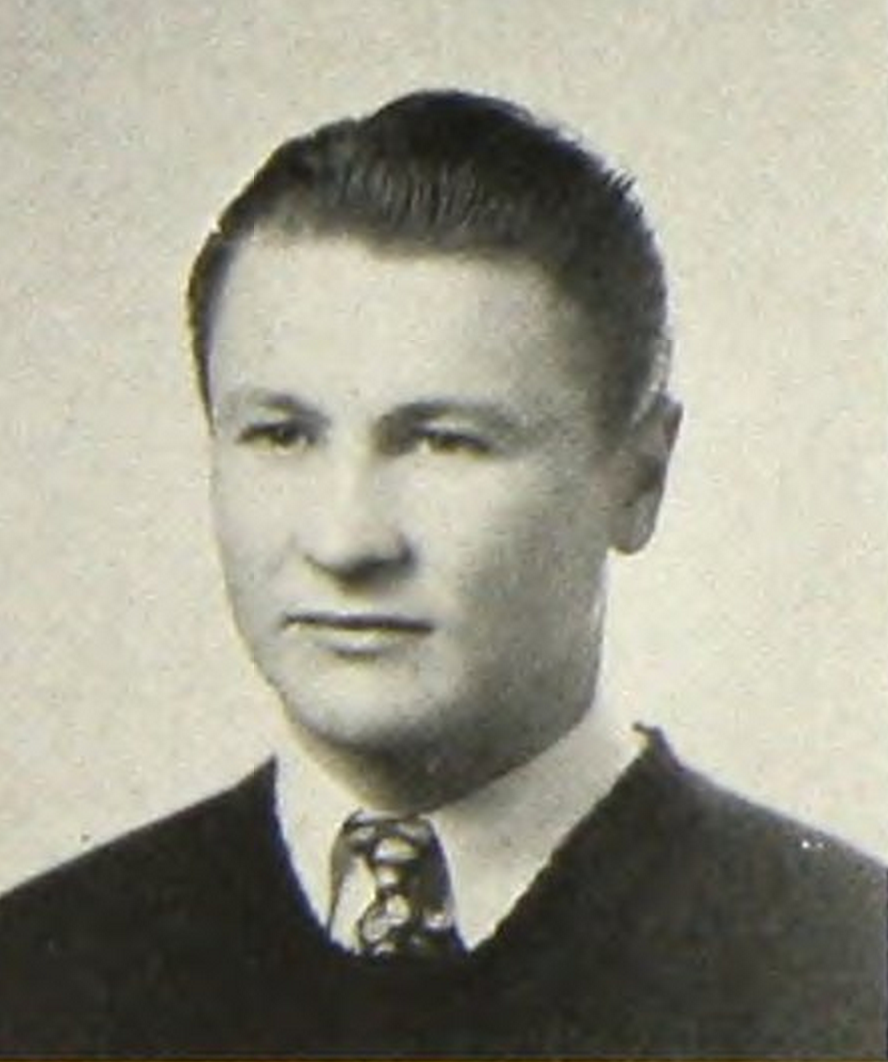
- Daley pictured c. 1942 at the University of Minnesota

No. 71, 77, 73
- Positions: Fullback, defensive back, linebacker

Personal information
- Born: September 16, 1919; Melrose, Minnesota, U.S.
- Died: October 19, 2015 (aged 96); Edina, Minnesota, U.S.
- Listed height: 6 ft 2 in (1.88 m)
- Listed weight: 210 lb (95 kg)

Career information
- High school: Melrose
- College: DePaul (1939); Minnesota (1940–1942); Michigan (1943); Columbia (1944)
- NFL draft: 1943: 1st round, 7th overall pick

Career history
- Brooklyn Dodgers (1946); Miami Seahawks (1946); Chicago Rockets (1947); New York Yankees (1948)

Awards and highlights
- 2× National champion (1940, 1941); Unanimous All-American (1943); Third-team All-American (1942); 2× First-team All-Big Ten (1941, 1943)

Career AAFC statistics
- Rushing yards: 612
- Rushing average: 3.5
- Receptions: 18
- Receiving yards: 142
- Total touchdowns: 5
- Stats at Pro Football Reference

William Edward Daley (September 16, 1919 – October 19, 2015) was an All-American fullback who played for the University of Minnesota Golden Gophers from 1940 to 1942 and for the University of Michigan Wolverines in 1943. The Gophers were national champions in his freshman and sophomore years.

He enlisted in the United States Navy in 1943 and was assigned to the V-12 Navy College Training Program at the University of Michigan. He played football for the Wolverines in 1943 where he rushed for 817 yards in just six games before being reassigned by the Navy. Based on his performance in 1943, he was named a unanimous All-American and finished sixth in the Heisman Trophy voting. Daley has the unique status of having played in and won Little Brown Jug games for both Minnesota and Michigan, compiling a record of 4–0 in those contests.

After active service in the Pacific Theater during World War II, Daley played professional football for three years in the All-America Football Conference (AAFC) with the Brooklyn Dodgers (1946), the Miami Seahawks (1946), the Chicago Rockets (1947), and the New York Yankees (1948). He later was one of the radio announcers for Minnesota Golden Gophers football for ten years and for the Minnesota Vikings when they first arrived in Minnesota.

Beginning in 1973, he owned and operated the Daley Illustration Gallery in downtown Minneapolis.

== Early life ==
Daley was born and raised in Melrose, Minnesota. After graduating from high school in St. Cloud, Minnesota, Daley moved to Chicago, Illinois to pursue a career as a boxer. Daley attended DePaul University in Chicago, where he met a track and field coach who persuaded him to pursue football.

== University of Minnesota ==
Daley enrolled at the University of Minnesota where he played football from 1940 to 1942. He played on two national championship teams at Minnesota in 1940 and 1941, and the Gophers narrowly missed a third national championship in 1942. The Gophers beat Michigan in the Little Brown Jug game all three years Daley played there. In 1940, the Gophers beat Tom Harmon's Wolverines 7–6. Harmon missed an extra point that cost Michigan the game.

== University of Michigan ==
After the 1942 season, Daley enlisted in the United States Navy. Because of his college background, Daley was selected to attend a midshipman academy at Columbia University in New York City. He was ordered to report to the University of Michigan because it had a V-12 Navy College Training Program. He stayed in Ann Arbor for only six months while waiting for an opening in the program at Columbia. While in Ann Arbor, recruits were required to remain in good physical shape and were given two choices: either participate in Navy fitness classes or work out with the Michigan football team. Michigan's football coach Fritz Crisler took advantage of the opportunity and convinced Daley to play for his football team, as Daley had one year of eligibility remaining.

He played for Michigan in 1943 where he was the nation's fourth best ground gainer despite playing in only six games. Daley's speed and power helped the Wolverines tie Purdue for the Big Ten Conference title. Daley averaged 6.8 yards per carry and scored nine touchdowns. He carried the ball 120 times, rushed for 817 yards and added another 119 yards on six punt returns. In addition to his six touchdowns, he kicked three extra points, for a total of 57 points scored. His best game came on October 2, 1943, at Evanston, Illinois, as Michigan beat Northwestern, 21–7 win. In that game, Daley gained 216 yards and scored two touchdowns in 26 carries.

In his final college football game, he helped the Wolverines win back the Little Brown Jug that he had helped the Gophers secure from 1940 to 1942. He holds the distinction of being the only player to win Little Brown Jug games playing for both Minnesota and Michigan. Asked at the time about having the opportunity to battle for the Little Brown Jug from the other side of the fence, Daley denied having qualms about playing his former teammates: "It will have to be just another game. I look at it just as though it were an intrasquad scrimmage. There won't be any qualms about how hard I hit my teammates or how hard they hit me." He did note, though, that he wanted his last college football game to be memorable: "If this is going to be my last game, I'd really like it to be one I can remember."

Daley later recalled the significance of the Little Brown Jug in the years he played: "We were always told to never lose this game. Winning the Little Brown Jug was very important to us. Fortunately I was able to go 4–0 in Little Brown Jug games while playing for both teams." Daley recalled that it was strange playing against his former Gopher teammates in the 1943 Jug game: "It was strange as I was playing against my teammates and friends, but I think it was the idea of winning the Little Brown Jug that motivated me. We beat Minnesota 49–6 and the Jug came to Michigan. It was a wild story." The Michigan victory snapped a nine-game losing streak to the Gophers. In addition to Daley, the 1943 Michigan team also benefited from the arrival of another wartime transfer, Pro Football Hall of Famer Elroy "Crazy Legs" Hirsch from Wisconsin. The press referred to Daley and Hirsch as "a pair of 'lend-lease' satellites."

He was named an All-American by the Associated Press and Collier's/Grantland Rice, and he finished seventh in the Heisman Trophy voting. When Daley was named an All-American along with Otto Graham in the backfield, one reporter referred to Daley as "Minnesota's gift to Michigan by way of the Navy V-12 class." The article noted that Daley was a speedster who could run 100 yards in 10 seconds. He gained 817 yards in just six games before being moved elsewhere by the Navy.

Though he never planned to play for Michigan, Daley looked back on the opportunity as a stroke of luck. "I was a lucky guy. I got to play for two great schools, but playing at Michigan was one of the greatest thrills I could have had. When I was at Michigan, I was the happiest guy in the world." Asked what it means to have played an important part in the football traditions at both Minnesota and Michigan, Daley said: "It means a lot to me. Both programs have been so wonderful to me long after I played. I am a member of both Hall of Fames and that is very special." Daley said his one disappointment about his college football career was that he never played on a team that beat Notre Dame. In 1943 Michigan lost to Notre Dame, 35–12. Despite 135 yards on 24 carries by Daley (the most yards gained on Notre Dame by any back in 1943), Michigan suffered its only loss to Notre Dame. Said Daley, "I wanted to beat them so bad, and I played one of the best games of my life, but it wasn't to be."

== Military service ==
After spending six months in Ann Arbor, Daley went on to Columbia University where he was a Regimental Commander for Columbia University's Naval unit.

After graduating from midshipman school at Portsmouth, Virginia, Daley went to Florida for amphibious training. He was on his way to the Pacific Theater when the war ended in August 1945. He remained overseas for a time, and played in an Army-Navy football game in Shanghai, China.

== Professional football ==
Daley was selected by the Pittsburgh Steelers as the seventh overall selection of the 1943 NFL draft. He never played for the team.

After the war, Daley signed a $30,000 contract to play professional football in the new All-America Football Conference. He played four seasons with the Brooklyn Dodgers, the Miami Seahawks the Chicago Rockets, and New York Yankees. Daley recalled that football players "didn't get paid much during those days, but did it for the love of the game." In comparing college and professional football in the 1940s, Daley noted: "I think most of us enjoyed the college days better." Daley's best season in professional football was 1947, when he played with Chicago. He played in 14 games for the Rockets and had 633 yards of total offense: 447 yards rushing (including a 52-yard run) in 121 carries; 116 yards receiving on 12 catches; and 70 yards passing with three completions in six passes.

== Broadcasting career ==
Following a career in professional football, Daley returned to the University of Minnesota and got his degree in education. He spent ten years in the broadcast booth for the Minnesota Golden Gophers with Dick Enroth and Ray Christensen. He also did a few years of color analysis on radio broadcasts of the Minnesota Vikings when the franchise began in the early 1960s.

== Daley Illustration Gallery ==
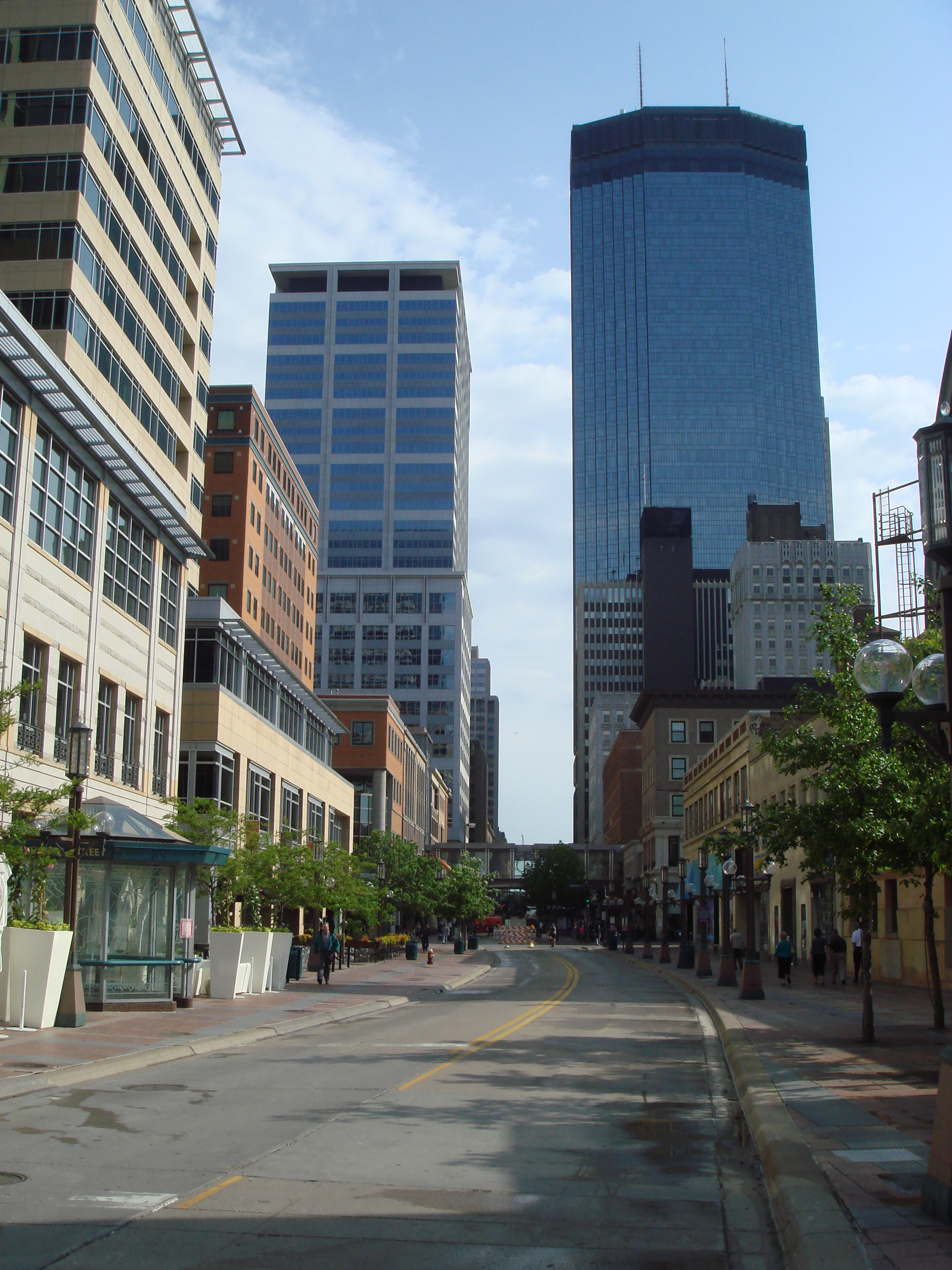
Nicollet Mall on a Saturday morning

Daley had always been passionate about art, but according to Daley, he "never had the talent to paint or draw at a high level." He became an art collector. In the early 1970s, Daley and his wife, Melba, opened their first studio. In approximately 1974, they then opened the Daly Illustration Art Gallery in the Hyatt Regency Hotel in downtown Minneapolis. From 1974 until his death, Daley has owned and operated Daley Illustration Gallery located in the Hyatt Regency Hotel, 1300 Nicollet Mall in Minneapolis, Minnesota. The Daley Illustration Gallery has 500 original illustrations, making it one of the finest illustration painting collections in the world. In a 1993 interview, Daley said, "Some people just come in to talk football, but don't know much about painting."

== Death and legacy ==
Daley married his wife, Melba, in 1972.

He died on October 19, 2015, at the age of 96.

In 1983, A Century of All Americans chose Daley as one of the All Time Football Fullbacks. In 2005 Daley was selected as one of the 100 greatest Michigan football players of all time by the "Motown Sports Revival," ranking 63rdt on the all-time team.

== See also ==
- List of Michigan Wolverines football All-Americans
