= Earl Maves =

American football player (1923–1952)

No. 12
- Position: Wingback

Personal information
- Born: April 8, 1923; Ladysmith, Wisconsin, U.S.
- Died: March 10, 1952 (aged 28); Eau Claire, Wisconsin, U.S.
- Listed height: 5 ft 9 in (1.75 m)
- Listed weight: 180 lb (82 kg)

Career information
- College: Wisconsin (1941-1942, 1946-1947); Michigan (1943)
- NFL draft: 1947: 26th round, 236th overall pick

Career history
- Baltimore Colts (1948); Detroit Lions (1948)

Career NFL statistics
- Games played: 1
- Stats at Pro Football Reference

Earl Maves (April 8, 1923 – March 10, 1952) was a player in the All America Football Conference (AAFC) and the National Football League (NFL). He was a member of the Baltimore Colts of the AAFC and the Detroit Lions of the NFL during 1948.

Maves died of Hodgkin's disease in 1952, having battled the disease for two years prior to his death.
