= 1943 Big Ten Conference football season =

- Sport: Football
- Number of teams: 9
- Top draft pick: Pat Harder
- Co-champions: Purdue, Michigan
- Season MVP: Otto Graham

Football seasons
- ← 1942 1944 →

1943 Big Ten Conference football standings
| | Conf. | | | | | Overall |
| Team | W | | L | | T | W | | L | | T |
|---|---|---|---|---|---|---|---|---|---|---|
| No. 5 Purdue + | 6 | – | 0 | – | 0 | 9 | – | 0 | – | 0 |
| No. 3 Michigan + | 6 | – | 0 | – | 0 | 8 | – | 1 | – | 0 |
| No. 9 Northwestern | 5 | – | 1 | – | 0 | 6 | – | 2 | – | 0 |
| Indiana | 2 | – | 3 | – | 1 | 4 | – | 4 | – | 2 |
| Minnesota | 2 | – | 3 | – | 0 | 5 | – | 4 | – | 0 |
| Illinois | 2 | – | 4 | – | 0 | 3 | – | 7 | – | 0 |
| Ohio State | 1 | – | 4 | – | 0 | 3 | – | 6 | – | 0 |
| Wisconsin | 1 | – | 6 | – | 0 | 1 | – | 9 | – | 0 |
| Iowa | 0 | – | 4 | – | 1 | 1 | – | 6 | – | 1 |
+ – Conference co-champions; Rankings from AP Poll

The 1943 Big Ten Conference football season was the 48th season of college football played by the member schools of the Big Ten Conference (also known as the Western Conference) and was a part of the 1943 college football season.

The 1943 Purdue Boilermakers football team compiled a perfect 9–0 record, tied for the Big Ten championship, led the conference in scoring defense (6.1 points per game), and were ranked No. 5 in the final AP Poll. Guard Alex Agase was a consensus first-team pick on the 1943 College Football All-America Team. Another guard, Dick Barwegen, received the team's most valuable player award.

Michigan, under head coach Fritz Crisler, compiled an 8–1, tied with Purdue for the conference championship, led the conference in scoring offense (33.6 points per game), and was ranked No. 3 in the final AP Poll. The team's sole loss was to consensus national champion Notre Dame. Bill Daley was a consensus first-team All-American and finished seventh in the voting for the Heisman Trophy. Bob Wiese received the team's most valuable player award.

Northwestern, under head coach Pappy Waldorf, compiled a 6–2 record and was ranked No. 9 in the final AP Poll. Quarterback Otto Graham received the Chicago Tribune Silver Football trophy as the most valuable player in the Big Ten. Northwestern's two losses were to No. 1 Notre Dame and No. 3 Michigan.

== Season overview ==
=== Results and team statistics ===
| Conf. Rank | Team | Head coach | AP final | AP high | Overall record | Conf. record | PPG | PAG | MVP |
|---|---|---|---|---|---|---|---|---|---|
| 1 (tie) | Purdue | Elmer Burnham | #5 | #2 | 9–0 | 6–0 | 23.8 | 6.1 | Dick Barwegen |
| 1 (tie) | Michigan | Fritz Crisler | #3 | #2 | 8–1 | 6–0 | 33.6 | 8.1 | Bob Wiese |
| 3 | Northwestern | Pappy Waldorf | #9 | #8 | 6–2 | 5–1 | 23.6 | 8.0 | Otto Graham |
| 4 | Indiana | Bo McMillin | NR | NR | 4–4–2 | 2–3–1 | 19.3 | 10.6 | John Tavener |
| 5 | Minnesota | George Hauser | NR | #9 | 5–4 | 2–3 | 18.9 | 20.4 | Paul Mitchell |
| 6 | Illinois | Ray Eliot | NR | NR | 3–7 | 2–4 | 15.4 | 30.8 | Eddie Bray |
| 7 | Ohio State | Paul Brown | NR | #18 | 3–6 | 1–4 | 16.6 | 20.8 | Gordon Appleby |
| 8 | Wisconsin | Harry Stuhldreher | NR | NR | 1–9 | 1–6 | 4.1 | 28.2 | Joe Keenan |
| 9 | Iowa | Slip Madigan | NR | NR | 1–6–1 | 0–4–1 | 10.4 | 19.1 | Robert Liddy |

Key
PPG = Average of points scored per game
PAG = Average of points allowed per game
MVP = Most valuable player as voted by players on each team as part of the voting process to determine the winner of the Chicago Tribune Silver Football trophy

=== Bowl games ===
During the 1943 season, the Big Ten maintained its long-standing ban on postseason games. Accordingly, no Big Ten teams participated in any bowl games.

== All-Big Ten players ==
The following players were picked by the Associated Press (AP) and/or the United Press (UP) as first-team players on the 1943 All-Big Ten Conference football team.

- Herb Hein, end, Northwestern (AP, UP)
- Pete Pihos, end, Indiana (AP, UP)
- Paul A. Mitchell, tackle, Minnesota (AP, UP)
- Bill Willis, tackle, Ohio State (AP, UP)
- Dick Barwegen, guard, Purdue (AP, UP)
- Alex Agase, guard, Purdue (AP, UP)
- Fred Negus, center, Michigan (AP, UP)
- Bob Hoernschemeyer, quarterback/halfback, Indiana (AP, UP)
- Bob Wiese, quarterback, Michigan (UP)
- Otto Graham, halfback, Northwestern (AP, UP)
- Tony Butkovich, halfback, Purdue (AP)
- Bill Daley, fullback, Michigan (AP, UP)

== All-Americans ==
At the end of the 1943 season, Big Ten players secured two of the consensus first-team picks for the 1943 College Football All-America Team. The Big Ten's consensus All-Americans were:

- Alex Agase, guard, Purdue (AAB, FN, INS, LK, SN, UP, CP)
- Bill Daley, halfback, Michigan (AAB, AP, CO, FN, INS, LK, SN, UP, CP, NYS, SS)

Other Big Ten players who were named first-team All-Americans by at least one selector were:

- Pete Pihos, end, Indiana (AAB, SN, CO, NYS)
- Herb Hein, end, Northwestern (CO)
- Merv Pregulman, tackle, Michigan (CO, FN, LK, SN, SS)
- Otto Graham, quarterback, Northwestern (AAB, AP, FN, CP)
- Tony Butkovich, fullback, Purdue (SN, UP, CP, SS)

== 1944 NFL draft ==
The following Big Ten players were selected in the first six rounds of the 1944 NFL draft:

| Name | Position | Team | Round | Overall pick |
|---|---|---|---|---|
| Pat Harder | Fullback | Wisconsin | 1 | 2 |
| Otto Graham | Quarterback | Northwestern | 1 | 4 |
| Billy Hillenbrand | Halfback | Indiana | 1 | 6 |
| Merv Pregulman | Guard | Michigan | 1 | 7 |
| Paul Mitchell | Tackle | Minnesota | 2 | 12 |
| Tom Kuzma | Halfback | Michigan | 3 | 22 |
| Rudy Smeja | End | Michigan | 3 | 24 |
| Babe Dimancheff | Halfback | Purdue | 3 | 27 |
| Jack Tavener | Center | Indiana | 4 | 28 |
| Rudy Sikich | Tackle | Minnesota | 4 | 29 |
| John Greene | Tackle | Michigan | 5 | 35 |
| Bill Garnaas | Back | Minnesota | 6 | 44 |
