= 1943 Purdue Boilermakers football team =

American college football season

1943 Purdue Boilermakers football

Big Ten co-champion
- Conference: Big Ten Conference

Ranking
- AP: No. 5
- Record: 9–0 (6–0 Big Ten)
- Head coach: Elmer Burnham (2nd season)
- MVP: Dick Barwegen
- Captain: None
- Home stadium: Ross–Ade Stadium

1943 Big Ten Conference football standings
	Conf.					Overall
Team	W		L		T	W		L		T
No. 5 Purdue +	6	–	0	–	0	9	–	0	–	0
No. 3 Michigan +	6	–	0	–	0	8	–	1	–	0
No. 9 Northwestern	5	–	1	–	0	6	–	2	–	0
Indiana	2	–	3	–	1	4	–	4	–	2
Minnesota	2	–	3	–	0	5	–	4	–	0
Illinois	2	–	4	–	0	3	–	7	–	0
Ohio State	1	–	4	–	0	3	–	6	–	0
Wisconsin	1	–	6	–	0	1	–	9	–	0
Iowa	0	–	4	–	1	1	–	6	–	1
+ – Conference co-champions; Rankings from AP Poll

The 1943 Purdue Boilermaker football team was an American football team that represented Purdue University during the 1943 Big Ten Conference football season. In their second year under head coach Elmer Burnham, the Boilermakers compiled an undefeated 9–0 record (6–0 in conference games), won the Big Ten championship, outscored their opponents by a total of 214 to 55, and were ranked No. 5 in the final AP poll.

The 1943 squad was the only undefeated team playing a full schedule in major college football, but finished fifth in the AP Poll.

The 1942 Purdue team had won only one game, but the 1943 team was bolstered with several new players who had been transferred to Purdue as part of the V-12 Navy College Training Program. However, two of the notable standouts, Alex Agase and Tony Butkovich were transferred from Purdue by the Marines prior to the Minnesota game.

Purdue guard Alex Agase was selected as a consensus first-team player on the 1943 All-America Team, and was later inducted into the College Football Hall of Fame. Fullback Tony Butkovich was also selected as a first-team All-American by The Sporting News, the United Press, the Central Press, and Stars and Stripes newspaper. Butkovich led the Big Ten in scoring with 14 touchdowns despite missing the last two games after being called to active duty by the Marines; he was killed in action at the Battle of Okinawa in April 1945.

== Schedule ==
Date	Opponent	Rank	Site	Result	Attendance	Source
September 18	at Great Lakes Navy*		Ross Field; Chicago, IL	W 23–13	22,000	
September 25	at Marquette*		Marquette Stadium; Milwaukee, WI	W 21–0	22,000	
October 2	Illinois		Ross–Ade Stadium; West Lafayette, IN (rivalry)	W 40–21	15,000	
October 9	Camp Grant*	No. 7	Ross–Ade Stadium; West Lafayette, IN	W 19–0	13,000	
October 16	vs. Ohio State	No. 5	Municipal Stadium; Cleveland, OH	W 30–7	41,509	
October 23	Iowa^{†}	No. 4	Ross–Ade Stadium; West Lafayette, IN	W 28–7	15,000	
October 30	at Wisconsin	No. 4	Camp Randall Stadium; Madison, WI	W 32–0	10,000	
November 6	at Minnesota	No. 2	Memorial Stadium; Minneapolis, MN	W 14–7	43,000	
November 20	Indiana	No. 3	Ross–Ade Stadium; West Lafayette, IN (Old Oaken Bucket)	W 7–0	15,000	
*Non-conference game; ^{†}Homecoming; Rankings from AP Poll released prior to the game; Source:

== Rankings ==
Ranking movements Legend: ██ Increase in ranking ██ Decrease in ranking ( ) = First-place votes
	Week								
Poll	1	2	3	4	5	6	7	8	Final
AP	7 (2)	5	4 (1)	4 (1)	2	2	3	4	5 (12)

== Game summaries ==
=== Illinois ===
- Tony Butkovich 12 rushes, 207 yards

=== Ohio State ===
- Tony Butkovich 36 rushes, 123 yards
- Babe Dimancheff 16 rushes, 122 yards

=== Iowa ===
- Tony Butkovich 19 rushes, 149 yards

=== Wisconsin ===
- Tony Butkovich 28 rushes, 147 yards
- Babe Dimancheff 15 rushes, 111 yards

== Roster ==
=== Players ===
- Alex Agase, guard #95
- Dick Barwegen, guard #21
- Frank Bauman, end #74
- Joe Buscemi, end #50
- Dick Bushnell #29
- Jack Butt, guard #40
- Tony Butkovich, #25, fullback
- Jim Darr, back #70
- Boris Dimancheff #87
- Stan Dubicki, back #22
- Bump Elliott#18
- John Genis, tackle #69
- Herbert Hoffman, end #99
- Tom Hughes, tackle #44
- Mike Kasap, tackle #64
- Bill Newell #96
- Bill O'Keefe, end #34
- Keith Parker, back #88
- Bill Stuart, halfback #89
- Sam Vacanti #33
- John Staak, tackle #32
- Lewis Rose, Halfback #36

=== Coaches and administrators ===
- Head coach: Elmer Burnham
- Assistant coaches: Cecil Isbell, Sam Voinoff, Joe Dienhart
- Athletic director: Guy "Red" Mackey
