= Mike Michalske =

American football player and coach (1903–1983)

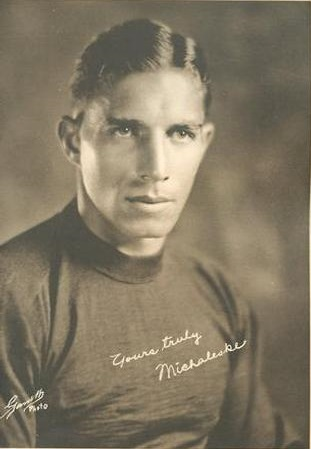

No. 22, 36, 28, 19, 31, 63, 33
- Positions: Guard, fullback

Personal information
- Born: April 24, 1903; Cleveland, Ohio, U.S.
- Died: October 26, 1983 (aged 80); Green Bay, Wisconsin, U.S.
- Listed height: 6 ft 0 in (1.83 m)
- Listed weight: 210 lb (95 kg)

Career information
- High school: Lincoln-West (Cleveland)
- College: Penn State (1923–1925)

Career history

Playing
- New York Yankees (1926–1928); Green Bay Packers (1929–1935, 1937)

Coaching
- Ashland College (1928–1929) Line coach; Lafayette College (1936) Asst. coach; Green Bay Packers (1935, 1937) Asst. coach; Chicago Cardinals (1939) Asst. coach; St. Norbert College (1940) Line coach; Iowa State (1942–1946) Head coach; Baltimore Colts (1949) Asst. coach; Baylor (1950–1952) Line coach; Texas A&M (1953) Line coach; Texas (1954) Line coach

Awards and highlights
- 3× NFL champion (1929, 1930, 1931); 7× First-team All-Pro (1927–1931, 1934, 1935); NFL 1920s All-Decade Team; Green Bay Packers Hall of Fame

Career NFL statistics
- Games played: 122
- Games started: 94
- Stats at Pro Football Reference
- Pro Football Hall of Fame

August Michael Michalske (April 24, 1903 – October 26, 1983), sometimes known as "Iron Mike", was an American football player and coach. He was inducted into the Pro Football Hall of Fame as part of its second induction class in 1964. He was also named in 1969 to the NFL 1920s All-Decade Team.

Born and raised in Cleveland, Michalske played college football, principally at the guard and fullback positions, for Hugo Bezdek's Penn State Nittany Lions from 1923 to 1925. He played professional football as a guard with the New York Yankees from 1926 to 1927 and with the Green Bay Packers from 1929 to 1935 and 1937. He led the Packers to three consecutive National Football League (NFL) championships from 1929 to 1931 and was selected seven times as a first-team All-Pro between 1927 and 1935.

Michalske also had a long career as a football coach, including serving as Iowa State's head coach from 1942 to 1946 and as an assistant coach with Lafayette College (1936), the Green Bay Packers (1937), the Chicago Cardinals (1939), St. Norbert College (1940–1941), Baltimore Colts (1949), Baylor (1950–1952), Texas A&M (1953), and Texas (1954).

== Early life ==
Michalske was born in Cleveland in 1903. His father, August Michalske (1868–1932), was a German immigrant who worked in 1910 as a teamster and in 1920 as "draying" contractor. His mother, Anna (Becker) Michalske (1872–1952), was also a German immigrant. Michalske had three older brothers (Arthur, Charles, and George) and two older sisters (Elizabeth and Laura). He attended Cleveland's West High School where he starred in three sports.

== College career ==
Michalske attended Pennsylvania State University where he played for Penn State Nittany Lions football team from 1923 to 1925. He played as a guard in 1923 and at halfback and guard in 1924. Partway through the 1925 season, Penn State coach Hugo Bezdek moved Michalske from guard to fullback. He scored both Penn State touchdowns in a 13–6 victory over Michigan State, and by the end of the year he was rated as "one of the greatest defensive fullbacks of the season."

== Professional football ==
=== New York Yankees ===
Michalske began his professional football career in 1926 as a guard for the New York Yankees of the first American Football League. The following year, the Yankees joined the National Football League (NFL). Michalske appeared in 14 and 13 games, respectively, for the 1927 and 1928 Yankees teams that compiled records of 7-8-1 and 4–8–1. While with the Yankees, Michalske established him as one of the best linemen in the NFL, securing first-team All-Pro honors in both 1927 and 1928.

=== Green Bay Packers ===
In September 1929, Michalske signed a contract to play for the Green Bay Packers. By that time, he was already "rated as the best guard in the National Football league." He appeared in all 13 games for the 1929 Packers team that compiled a 12-0-1 record and won the franchise's first NFL championship. After the season, Ernie Nevers rated Michalske the best player in the NFL, calling him a "wonder" and adding, "There's nobody like him on the college or professional field today." Michalske was also selected as a consensus All-Pro for the 1929 season with first-team honors from Collyers Eye magazine, the Chicago Tribune, and the Green Bay Press-Gazette.

In 1930, Michalske returned to the Packers and helped lead the team to its second consecutive NFL championship. He was described as "one of the outstanding players in the country," and he was selected at the end of the season as a first-time All-Pro by the Green Bay Press-Gazette and Collyer's Eye.

In 1931, Michalske led the Packers to an unprecedented third consecutive NFL championship. On November 1, 1931, Michalske returned an interception 80 yards for a touchdown to account for every point in a 6–2 victory over the Chicago Bears. At the end of the season, Michalske was selected as a first-team All-Pro on the official NFL All-Pro team and by the United Press and the Green Bay Press-Gazette.

Michalske remained with the Packers for an additional five seasons from 1932 to 1935 and again in 1937. He was selected as a first-team All-Pro in 1934 by the Green Bay Press-Gazette and in 1935 by the NFL, Chicago Daily News, and Green Bay Press-Gazette.

In 1935, Michalske became an assistant coach under head coach Curly Lambeau, adding those duties to his responsibilities as a player. He retired as a player and left the Packers after the 1935 season, but in August 1937, he signed a contract to return to the Packers as a player and assistant coach for the 1937 season. His playing career ended on October 31, 1937, when he sustained a back injury after allegedly being kicked by an opposing player in a game against the Detroit Lions; he was hospitalized in Detroit for several days after the game. He confirmed his retirement as a player in August 1938.

Michalske was known by the nickname "Iron Mike" because despite playing 60 minutes a game, he missed only nine of 104 games during his tenure with the Packers, five of them following the back injury in his final season. He wore nine uniform numbers over his Packers career, the most by any player in team history: 19 (1932), 24 (1934), 28 (1931), 30 (1932), 31 (1933), 33 (1935), 36 (1929–30, 37), 40 (1935) and 63 (1934).

== Coaching career ==
=== 1930s ===
Michalske began his coaching career as the line coach at Ashland College in Ohio during the 1928 and 1929 seasons. While serving as an assistant coach at Ashland, he was also an All-Pro player in the NFL for the Yankees in 1928 and Packers in 1929.

In March 1936, Michalske returned to coaching as an assistant football coach under head coach Ernie Nevers at Lafayette College in Easton, Pennsylvania. Nevers and Michalske led Lafayette to a 1–8 record in 1936.

Michalske was an assistant coach for the Packers under Curly Lambeau during the 1935 and 1936 seasons. In late November 1937, Michalske returned to Lafayette College for his second year as the head coach of the basketball team.

In September 1939, Michalske was reunited with Ernie Nevers who had taken over as head coach of the Chicago Cardinals. Michalske was hired as an assistant football coach and scout for the Cardinals. The 1939 Cardinals compiled a 1–10 record, and neither Nevers nor Michalske returned to the club in 1940.

=== 1940s ===
In the spring of 1940, Michalske was hired as the track coach at St. Norbert College in De Pere, Wisconsin. He also served as the line coach for the St. Norbert football team in 1940 and 1941. He remained at St. Norbert for two years. During that time, the football team compiled records of 3-3-1 in 1940 and 6–2 in 1941.

In August 1942, Michalske was hired as the line coach at Iowa State College. On October 14, 1942, he replaced Ray Donels as the head coach of the Iowa State football team. After mediocre seasons in 1942 and 1943, Michalske led Iowa State in 1944 to a 6–1–1 record (3–1–1 in conference) and a tie for second place in the Big Six Conference. The 1944 Iowa State team shut out Kansas (25–0) and Kansas State (14–0), ran up 288 rushing yards in a 19–6 victory over Nebraska, and suffered its sole loss to Oklahoma.

Michalske remained head coach at Iowa State through the 1946 season, though his teams stumbled to records of 4–3–1 in 1945 and 2–6–1 in 1946. He resigned his position at Iowa State in February 1947. His overall record as head football coach at Iowa State was 18–18–3 (8–9–2 against conference opponents).

In September 1947, Michalske joined the Packers' scouting staff.

In April 1949, he was hired as an assistant coach with the Baltimore Colts of the All-America Football Conference. The 1949 Colts compiled a record of 1–11.

=== 1950s ===
In February 1950, Michalske was hired as the line coach at Baylor in Waco, Texas. He spent three years at Baylor under head coach George Sauer, with whom Michalske had played in Green Bay. During Michalske's three years at Baylor, the Baylor football team compiled records of 7–3, 8–2–1, and 4–4–2. Michalske resigned from in December 1952, effective at the end of his contract in March 1953.

In May 1953, Michalske was hired as the line coach at Texas A&M in College Station, Texas. During Michalske's one-year tenure at Texas A&M, the 1953 Aggies were led by head coach Raymond George and compiled a 4–5–1 record.

In January 1955, he was hired by Texas as an assistant football coach on a one-year contract. He was the line coach for the 1955 and 1956 Texas teams that compiled 5–5 and 1–9 records under head coach Ed Price.

== Awards and honors ==
Michalske received numerous honors and awards for his accomplishments as a football player. In 1964, he was inducted as part of the second class of inductees into the Pro Football Hall of Fame. He was the first guard to be inducted. In 1969, Michalske was selected by the Pro Football Hall of Fame as a guard on the NFL 1920s All-Decade Team. He was also inducted in 1970 with the first group of inductees into the Green Bay Packers Hall of Fame, and in 1971 he was inducted into the Wisconsin Athletic Hall of Fame.

== Family and later years ==
Michalske was married to Doris Luke (1907–2001) at Waukegan, Illinois, in October 1932. They had two daughters, Lee Ann and Melinda. Both daughters became school teachers in Wisconsin.

In his later years, Michalske lived in De Pere, Wisconsin. He died at a Green Bay hospital in October 1983 at age 80. He was buried at Woodlawn Cemetery in Allouez, Wisconsin.

== Head coaching record ==
=== Football ===
Year	Team	Overall	Conference	Standing	Bowl/playoffs
Iowa State Cyclones (Big Six Conference) (1942–1946)
1942	Iowa State	2–4 (Note: Ray Donels served as head coach for the first three games of the 1942 season before resigning. He led the Cyclones to an overall record of 1–2 and conference mark of 0–1. Michalske coached the final six games of the season. Iowa State finished the 1942 season with an overall record of 3–6 and tied for the fifth place in the conference with a mark of 1–4.)	1–3	T–5th	
1943	Iowa State	4–4	3–2	T–2nd	
1944	Iowa State	6–1–1	3–1–1	T–2nd	
1945	Iowa State	4–3–1	2–2–1	3rd	
1946	Iowa State	2–6–1	1–4	5th	
Iowa State:		18–18–3	10–12–2		
Total:		18–18–3			
