= 1943 Minnesota Golden Gophers football team =

American college football season

1943 Minnesota Golden Gophers football
- Conference: Big Ten Conference
- Record: 5–4 (2–3 Big Ten)
- Head coach: George Hauser (2nd season)
- MVP: Paul Mitchell
- Captains: Clifford Anderson; Paul Mitchell
- Home stadium: Memorial Stadium

1943 Big Ten Conference football standings
	Conf.					Overall
Team	W		L		T	W		L		T
No. 5 Purdue +	6	–	0	–	0	9	–	0	–	0
No. 3 Michigan +	6	–	0	–	0	8	–	1	–	0
No. 9 Northwestern	5	–	1	–	0	6	–	2	–	0
Indiana	2	–	3	–	1	4	–	4	–	2
Minnesota	2	–	3	–	0	5	–	4	–	0
Illinois	2	–	4	–	0	3	–	7	–	0
Ohio State	1	–	4	–	0	3	–	6	–	0
Wisconsin	1	–	6	–	0	1	–	9	–	0
Iowa	0	–	4	–	1	1	–	6	–	1
+ – Conference co-champions; Rankings from AP Poll

The 1943 Minnesota Golden Gophers football team represented the University of Minnesota in the 1943 Big Ten Conference football season. In their second year under head coach George Hauser, the Golden Gophers compiled a 5–4 record but were outscored by their opponents by a combined total of 184 to 170.

Fullback Bill Daley and end Herb Hein were named All-Americans by the Associated Press. Daley was also named an All-American by Collier's/Grantland Rice. Tackle Paul Mitchell was named All-Big Ten first team.

Paul Mitchell was awarded the Team MVP Award.

In the final Litkenhous Ratings, Minnesota ranked 21st among the nation's college and service teams with a rating of 96.4.

Total attendance for the season was 182,779, which averaged 26,111. The season high for attendance was against Purdue.

== Schedule ==
Date	Opponent	Rank	Site	Result	Attendance	Source
September 25	Missouri*		Memorial Stadium; Minneapolis, MN	W 26–13	30,000	
October 2	Nebraska*		Memorial Stadium; Minneapolis, MN (rivalry)	W 54–0	34,000	
October 16	Camp Grant*	No. 13	Memorial Stadium; Minneapolis, MN	W 13–7	35,000	
October 23	at No. 10 Michigan	No. 11	Michigan Stadium; Ann Arbor, MI (Little Brown Jug)	L 6–49	45,000	
October 30	at No. 15 Northwestern		Dyche Stadium; Evanston, IL	L 6–42	32,000	
November 6	No. 2 Purdue^{†}		Memorial Stadium; Minneapolis, MN	L 7–14	43,000	
November 13	Iowa		Memorial Stadium; Minneapolis, MN (rivalry)	W 33–14	20,000	
November 20	Wisconsin		Memorial Stadium; Minneapolis, MN (rivalry)	W 25–13	20,000	
November 27	No. 2 Iowa Pre-Flight*		Memorial Stadium; Minneapolis, MN	L 0–32	18,261	
*Non-conference game; ^{†}Homecoming; Rankings from AP Poll released prior to the game

== Rankings ==
Ranking movements Legend: ██ Increase in ranking ██ Decrease in ranking — = Not ranked ( ) = First-place votes
	Week								
Poll	1	2	3	4	5	6	7	8	Final
AP	9 (1)	13	11	—	—	—	—	—	—

== Game summaries ==
=== Michigan ===
Week 5: Minnesota at Michigan

Team	1	2	3	4	Total
Minnesota	0	6	0	0	6
• Michigan	7	7	14	21	49

- Date: October 23, 1943
- Location: Michigan Stadium, Ann Arbor, Michigan
- Game start: 1:30 p.m. (C.W.T.)
- Game attendance: 45,000
- Referee: William A. Blake (Loras)

On October 23, 1942, Minnesota played Michigan in the annual Little Brown Jug game. The Wolverines had lost nine straight games to Bernie Bierman's Minnesota teams, the last Michigan victory having been in 1932.

Michigan defeated Minnesota by a score of 49 to 6 in front of a crowd of 45,000 spectators at Michigan Stadium. The 43-point margin made it the worst defeat sustained by a Minnesota team to that point in the program's history. On the first play from scrimmage, Elroy Hirsch ran 61 yards on a reverse around right end for a touchdown. Hirsch scored a total of three touchdowns and also intercepted a Minnesota pass to stop a drive in the fourth quarter. Bill Daley, the V-12 transfer who played for Minnesota in 1942, became the first player to play for both sides in Little Brown Jug games. Prior to the game, the Chicago Daily Tribune referred to Daley as "the Gophers' war time gift to their football foes." Daley scored two touchdowns, returned a punt for 37 yards to set up Hirsch's second touchdown, and kicked two extra points. After five games, Daley was the leading rusher in college football with 620 rushing yards on 98 carries.

Minnesota's only touchdown was set up by an interception of a pass thrown by Jack Wink. The interception was returned to Michigan's 15-yard line, and Frank Loren scored the touchdown late in the second quarter. Bob Wiese blocked Minnesota's extra point kick. In the fourth quarter, Wink threw a 51-yard touchdown pass to Farnham Johnson. Bob Nussbaumer also scored a touchdown for Michigan. Merv Pregulman added four extra points. Michigan dominated the game with 230 rushing yards and 128 passing yards, while holding Minnesota to 60 rushing yards and 14 passing yards.
