= 1943 Oklahoma Sooners football team =

American college football season

1943 Oklahoma Sooners football

Big 6 champion
- Conference: Big Six Conference
- Record: 7–2 (5–0 Big 6)
- Head coach: Dewey Luster (3rd season)
- Captains: Bob Brumley; W. G. Wooten
- Home stadium: Memorial Stadium

1943 Big Six Conference football standings
| | Conf. | | | | | Overall |
| Team | W | | L | | T | W | | L | | T |
|---|---|---|---|---|---|---|---|---|---|---|
| Oklahoma $ | 5 | – | 0 | – | 0 | 7 | – | 2 | – | 0 |
| Missouri | 3 | – | 2 | – | 0 | 3 | – | 5 | – | 0 |
| Iowa State | 3 | – | 2 | – | 0 | 4 | – | 4 | – | 0 |
| Kansas | 2 | – | 3 | – | 0 | 4 | – | 5 | – | 1 |
| Nebraska | 2 | – | 3 | – | 0 | 2 | – | 6 | – | 0 |
| Kansas State | 0 | – | 5 | – | 0 | 1 | – | 7 | – | 0 |
$ – Conference champion

The 1943 Oklahoma Sooners football team represented the University of Oklahoma in the 1943 college football season. In their third year under head coach Dewey Luster, the Sooners compiled a 7–2 record (5–0 against conference opponents), won the Big Six Conference championship, and outscored their opponents by a combined total of 187 to 92.

No Sooners received All-America honors in 1943, but six Sooners received all-conference honors: Bob Brumley (back), Gale Fulgham (guard), Lee Kennon (tackle), W.G. Lamb (end), Derald Lebow (back), and Bob Mayfield (center).

In the final Litkenhous Ratings, Oklahoma ranked 41st among the nation's college and service teams with a rating of 85.7.

== Schedule ==
| Date | Time | Opponent | Site | Result | Attendance | Source |
|---|---|---|---|---|---|---|
| September 25 | 2:30 p.m. | Norman NAS* | Memorial Stadium; Norman, OK | W 22–6 | 10,000 | |
| October 2 | | vs. Oklahoma A&M* | Taft Stadium; Oklahoma City, OK (Bedlam) | W 22–13 | 12,000 | |
| October 9 | | vs. Texas* | Cotton Bowl; Dallas, TX (rivalry) | L 7–13 | 18,500 | |
| October 16 | | vs. Tulsa* | Taft Stadium; Oklahoma City, OK | L 6–20 | 15,000 | |
| October 23 | | at Kansas State | Memorial Stadium; Manhattan, KS | W 37–0 | | |
| October 30 | | Iowa State | Memorial Stadium; Norman, OK | W 21–7 | 5,170 | |
| November 6 | | Kansas | Memorial Stadium; Norman, OK | W 26–13 | 4,000 | |
| November 13 | | at Missouri | Memorial Stadium; Columbia, MO (rivalry) | W 20–13 | | |
| November 20 | | at Nebraska | Memorial Stadium; Lincoln, NE (rivalry) | W 26–7 | | |
*Non-conference game; All times are in Central time

== NFL draft ==
The following players were drafted into the National Football League following the season.

| Round | Pick | Player | Position | NFL team |
|---|---|---|---|---|
| 12 | 111 | Jim Tyree | End | Brooklyn Tigers |
| 22 | 227 | Ed Davis | Guard | Chicago Bears |
| 22 | 230 | Clare Morford | Back | Boston Yanks |
| 23 | 233 | Max Fischer | Center | Detroit Lions |
| 27 | 276 | Joe Golding | Back | Brooklyn Tigers |
