= 1944 Kansas State Wildcats football team =

American college football season

1944 Kansas State Wildcats football
- Conference: Big Six Conference
- Record: 2–5–2 (1–4 Big 6)
- Head coach: Ward Haylett (3rd season)
- Home stadium: Memorial Stadium

1944 Big Six Conference football standings
| | Conf. | | | | | Overall |
| Team | W | | L | | T | W | | L | | T |
|---|---|---|---|---|---|---|---|---|---|---|
| Oklahoma $ | 4 | – | 0 | – | 1 | 6 | – | 3 | – | 1 |
| Iowa State | 3 | – | 1 | – | 1 | 6 | – | 1 | – | 1 |
| Missouri | 2 | – | 1 | – | 2 | 3 | – | 5 | – | 2 |
| Nebraska | 2 | – | 3 | – | 0 | 2 | – | 6 | – | 0 |
| Kansas | 1 | – | 4 | – | 0 | 3 | – | 6 | – | 1 |
| Kansas State | 1 | – | 4 | – | 0 | 2 | – | 5 | – | 2 |
$ – Conference champion

The 1944 Kansas State Wildcats football team represented Kansas State University in the 1944 college football season. The team's head football coach was Ward Haylett, in his third and final year at the helm of the Wildcats. The Wildcats played their home games in Memorial Stadium. The Wildcats finished the season with a 2–5–2 record with a 1–4 record in conference play. They finished in last place in the Big Six Conference. The Wildcats scored 45 points and gave up 215 points.

== Schedule ==
| Date | Time | Opponent | Site | Result | Attendance | Source |
|---|---|---|---|---|---|---|
| September 30 | | Wichita* | Memorial Stadium; Manhattan, KS | T 6–6 | 3,500 | |
| October 7 | | Missouri | Memorial Stadium; Manhattan, KS | L 0–33 | 3,500 | |
| October 14 | | at Michigan State* | Macklin Field; East Lansing, MI | L 6–45 | 7,000 | |
| October 21 | | at Oklahoma | Oklahoma Memorial Stadium; Norman, OK | L 0–68 | 7,000 | |
| October 28 | | Iowa State | Memorial Stadium; Manhattan, KS (rivalry) | L 0–14 | 3,102 | |
| November 4 | | at Wichita* | Wichita, KS | W 15–0 | | |
| November 11 | | Kansas^{†} | Memorial Stadium; Manhattan, KS (rivalry) | W 18–14 | 8,000 | |
| November 18 | 2:00 p.m. | Olathe NAS* | Memorial Stadium; Manhattan, KS | T 0–0 | | |
| November 25 | | at Nebraska | Memorial Stadium; Lincoln, NE (rivalry) | L 0–35 | 2,000 | |
*Non-conference game; ^{†}Homecoming; All times are in Central time
