= Henry Shenk =

American football player and coach (1906–1989)

Biographical details
- Born: November 29, 1906; Galena, Kansas, U.S.
- Died: July 29, 1989 (aged 82); Nederland, Colorado, U.S.

Playing career
- 1926–1927: Kansas
- Position: End

Coaching career (HC unless noted)
- 1943–1945: Kansas

Head coaching record
- Overall: 11–16–3

Henry Arthur Shenk (November 29, 1906 – July 29, 1989) was an American football player and coach. He served as head football coach at the University of Kansas from 1943 to 1945, compiling a record of 11–16–3.

== Head coaching record ==
| Year | Team | Overall | Conference | Standing | Bowl/playoffs |
|---|---|---|---|---|---|
Kansas Jayhawks (Big Six Conference) (1943–1945)
| 1943 | Kansas | 4–5–1 | 2–3 | T–4th | |
| 1944 | Kansas | 3–6–1 | 1–4 | T–5th | |
| 1945 | Kansas | 4–5–1 | 1–3–1 | 5th | |
| Kansas: | | 11–16–3 | 4–10–1 | | |
| Total: | | 11–16–3 | | | |
