= 1943 Missouri Tigers football team =

American college football season

1943 Missouri Tigers football
- Conference: Big Six Conference
- Record: 3–5 (3–2 Big 6)
- Head coach: Chauncey Simpson (1st season)
- Home stadium: Memorial Stadium

1943 Big Six Conference football standings
	Conf.					Overall
Team	W		L		T	W		L		T
Oklahoma $	5	–	0	–	0	7	–	2	–	0
Missouri	3	–	2	–	0	3	–	5	–	0
Iowa State	3	–	2	–	0	4	–	4	–	0
Kansas	2	–	3	–	0	4	–	5	–	1
Nebraska	2	–	3	–	0	2	–	6	–	0
Kansas State	0	–	5	–	0	1	–	7	–	0
$ – Conference champion

The 1943 Missouri Tigers football team was an American football team that represented the University of Missouri in the Big Six Conference (Big 6) during the 1943 college football season. The team compiled a 6–3 record (3–2 against Big 6 opponents), finished in a tie for second place in the Big 6, and outscored all opponents by a combined total of 170 to 142. Chauncey Simpson was the head coach for the first of three seasons. The team played its home games at Memorial Stadium in Columbia, Missouri.

The team's leading scorers were Bill Dellastatious and Don Reece, each with 36 points.

In the final Litkenhous Ratings, Missouri ranked 56th among the nation's college and service teams with a rating of 81.8.

Don Faurot, who had been the team's head coach since 1935, stepped down in June 1943 to join the United States Navy during World War II. Chauncey Simpson, who had been the school's head track coach and a backfield coach for the football team, was appointed to serve as "acting football coach" during Faurot's military service. Simpson remained in charge of the team for three years from 1943 to 1945.

== Schedule ==
Date	Opponent	Site	Result	Attendance	Source
September 25	at Minnesota*	Memorial Stadium; Minneapolis, MN	L 13–26	30,000	
October 2	at Ohio State*	Ohio Stadium; Columbus, OH	L 6–27	27,525	
October 9	Kansas State	Memorial Stadium; Columbia, MO	W 47–14		
October 16	vs. No. 7 Iowa Pre-Flight*	Ruppert Stadium; Kansas City, MO	L 6–21	12,414	
October 30	Nebraska	Memorial Stadium; Columbia, MO (rivalry)	W 54–20		
November 6	at Iowa State	Clyde Williams Field; Ames, IA (rivalry)	W 25–7	4,490	
November 13	Oklahoma	Memorial Stadium; Columbia, MO (rivalry)	L 13–20		
November 20	at Kansas	Memorial Stadium; Lawrence, KS (rivalry)	L 6–7	8,000	
*Non-conference game; Rankings from AP Poll released prior to the game
