= 1943 Iowa Hawkeyes football team =

American college football season

1943 Iowa Hawkeyes football
- Conference: Big Ten Conference
- Record: 1–6–1 (0–4–1 Big Ten)
- Head coach: Slip Madigan (1st season)
- MVP: Robert Liddy
- Captains: Robert Liddy; William Barbour
- Home stadium: Iowa Stadium

1943 Big Ten Conference football standings
	Conf.					Overall
Team	W		L		T	W		L		T
No. 5 Purdue +	6	–	0	–	0	9	–	0	–	0
No. 3 Michigan +	6	–	0	–	0	8	–	1	–	0
No. 9 Northwestern	5	–	1	–	0	6	–	2	–	0
Indiana	2	–	3	–	1	4	–	4	–	2
Minnesota	2	–	3	–	0	5	–	4	–	0
Illinois	2	–	4	–	0	3	–	7	–	0
Ohio State	1	–	4	–	0	3	–	6	–	0
Wisconsin	1	–	6	–	0	1	–	9	–	0
Iowa	0	–	4	–	1	1	–	6	–	1
+ – Conference co-champions; Rankings from AP Poll

The 1943 Iowa Hawkeyes football team was an American football team that represented the University of Iowa as a member of the Big Ten Conference during the 1943 Big Ten football season. In their first year under head coach Slip Madigan, the Hawkeyes compiled a 1–6–1 record (0–4–1 in conference games), finished in last place in the Big Ten, and were outscored by a total of 153 to 83. Iowa ranked No. 34 in the final Litkenhous Ratings released in December 1943.

The team played its home games at Iowa Stadium (later renamed Kinnick Stadium) in Iowa City, Iowa.

== Schedule ==
Date	Opponent	Site	Result	Attendance	Source
September 25	at Great Lakes Navy*	Ross Field; North Chicago, IL	L 7–21		
October 2	Wisconsin	Iowa Stadium; Iowa City, IA (rivalry)	L 5–7		
October 9	No. 8 Iowa Pre-Flight*	Iowa Stadium; Iowa City, IA	L 0–25	10,000	
October 16	Indiana	Iowa Stadium; Iowa City, IA	T 7–7		
October 23	at No. 4 Purdue	Ross–Ade Stadium; West Lafayette, IN	L 7–28	15,000	
November 6	Illinois^{†}	Iowa Stadium; Iowa City, IA	L 10–19	11,000	
November 13	at Minnesota	Memorial Stadium; Minneapolis, MN (rivalry)	L 14–33	20,000	
November 20	at Nebraska*	Memorial Stadium; Lincoln, NE (rivalry)	W 33–13		
*Non-conference game; ^{†}Homecoming; Rankings from AP Poll released prior to the game
