= 1943 Northwestern Wildcats football team =

American college football season

1943 Northwestern Wildcats football
- Conference: Big Ten Conference

Ranking
- AP: No. 9
- Record: 6–2 (5–1 Big Ten)
- Head coach: Pappy Waldorf (9th season)
- Offensive scheme: Single-wing
- MVP: Otto Graham
- Captain: Alex Kapter
- Home stadium: Dyche Stadium

1943 Big Ten Conference football standings
	Conf.					Overall
Team	W		L		T	W		L		T
No. 5 Purdue +	6	–	0	–	0	9	–	0	–	0
No. 3 Michigan +	6	–	0	–	0	8	–	1	–	0
No. 9 Northwestern	5	–	1	–	0	6	–	2	–	0
Indiana	2	–	3	–	1	4	–	4	–	2
Minnesota	2	–	3	–	0	5	–	4	–	0
Illinois	2	–	4	–	0	3	–	7	–	0
Ohio State	1	–	4	–	0	3	–	6	–	0
Wisconsin	1	–	6	–	0	1	–	9	–	0
Iowa	0	–	4	–	1	1	–	6	–	1
+ – Conference co-champions; Rankings from AP Poll

The 1943 Northwestern Wildcats football team represented Northwestern University in the 1943 Big Ten Conference football season. The Wildcats finished 6–2, including 5–1 in conference play, were ranked ninth in the final AP Poll, and outscored their opponents by a combined score of 189 to 64 on the season.

In the final Litkenhous Ratings, Northwestern ranked third among the nation's college and service teams with a rating of 120.9.

This was future Pro Football Hall of Famer Otto Graham's third and final season as a player at Northwestern.

== Schedule ==
Date	Opponent	Rank	Site	Result	Attendance	Source
September 25	Indiana		Dyche Stadium; Evanston, IL	W 14–6		
October 2	Michigan		Dyche Stadium; Evanston, IL (rivalry)	L 7–21	32,077	
October 16	No. 14 Great Lakes Navy*		Dyche Stadium; Evanston, IL	W 13–0	35,000	
October 23	at Ohio State	No. 17	Ohio Stadium; Columbus, OH	W 13–0	37,243	
October 30	Minnesota	No. 15	Dyche Stadium; Evanston, IL	W 42–6	32,000	
November 6	at Wisconsin	No. 12	Camp Randall Stadium; Madison, WI	W 41–0		
November 13	No. 1 Notre Dame*	No. 8	Dyche Stadium; Evanton, IL (rivalry)	L 6–25	49,124	
November 20	Illinois	No. 9	Dyche Stadium; Evanston, IL (rivalry)	W 53–6	25,000	
*Non-conference game; Rankings from AP Poll released prior to the game

== Rankings ==
Ranking movements Legend: ██ Increase in ranking ██ Decrease in ranking — = Not ranked
	Week								
Poll	1	2	3	4	5	6	7	8	Final
AP	19	—	17	15	12	8	9	8	9

== Awards and honors ==
At the season's end, star quarterback Otto Graham was named the Big Ten's Most Valuable Player, finished third in Heisman Trophy balloting, and earned first-team All-American honors as selected by the Associated Press.

== Players selected in the 1944 NFL draft ==
Player	Position	Round	Pick	NFL club
Otto Graham	Quarterback/Tailback	1	4	Detroit Lions
Ed Hirsch	Back	16	161	Chicago Bears
Alex Kapter	Guard	21	211	Detroit Lions
Bill Ivy	Tackle	21	215	Washington Redskins
Don Buffmire	Back	23	231	Chicago Cardinals
Harry Franck	Back	26	271	Chicago Bears
Vince DiFrancesca	Tackle	29	297	Chicago Cardinals
