= 1943 Kansas Jayhawks football team =

American college football season

1943 Kansas Jayhawks football
- Conference: Big Six Conference
- Record: 4–5–1 (2–3 Big 6)
- Head coach: Henry Shenk (1st season)
- Captain: George Dick
- Home stadium: Memorial Stadium

1943 Big Six Conference football standings
	Conf.					Overall
Team	W		L		T	W		L		T
Oklahoma $	5	–	0	–	0	7	–	2	–	0
Missouri	3	–	2	–	0	3	–	5	–	0
Iowa State	3	–	2	–	0	4	–	4	–	0
Kansas	2	–	3	–	0	4	–	5	–	1
Nebraska	2	–	3	–	0	2	–	6	–	0
Kansas State	0	–	5	–	0	1	–	7	–	0
$ – Conference champion

The 1943 Kansas Jayhawks football team represented the University of Kansas in the Big Six Conference during the 1943 college football season. In their first season under head coach Henry Shenk, the Jayhawks compiled a 4–5–1 record (2–3 against conference opponents), tied for fourth place in the conference, and were outscored by opponents by a combined total of 107 to 96. They played their home games at Memorial Stadium in Lawrence, Kansas.

The team's statistical leaders included Bob George with 180 rushing yards and 288 passing yards, Charlie Moffatt with 230 receiving yards, and Bob Carson with 25 points scored (four touchdowns and one extra point). George Dick was the team captain.

In the final Litkenhous Ratings, Kansas ranked 103rd among the nation's college and service teams with a rating of 65.6.

== Schedule ==
Date	Opponent	Site	Result	Attendance	Source
September 24	at Washburn*	Moore Bowl; Topeka, KS	T 0–0	6,000	
October 1	at Denver*	DU Stadium; Denver, CO	L 6–19		
October 9	Iowa State	Memorial Stadium; Lawrence, KS	L 6–13	3,992	
October 16	Washburn*	Memorial Stadium; Lawrence, KS	W 13–0		
October 23	at Nebraska	Memorial Stadium; Lincoln, NE (rivalry)	L 6–7	3,500	
October 30	Kansas State	Memorial Stadium; Lawrence, KS (rivalry)	W 25–2		
November 6	at Oklahoma	Memorial Stadium; Norman, OK	L 13–26	4,000	
November 13	Central Missouri State*	Memorial Stadium; Lawrence, KS	W 13–12		
November 20	Missouri^{†}	Memorial Stadium; Lawrence, KS (rivalry)	W 7–6	8,000	
November 25	at Fort Riley*	Junction City, KS	L 7–22	4,000	
*Non-conference game; ^{†}Homecoming

== After the season ==
=== NFL draft ===
The following Jayhawks were selected in the 1944 NFL draft following the season.

Round	Pick	Player	Position	NFL club
1	9	Ray Evans	Back	Chicago Bears
9	87	Gene Long	Guard	Boston Yanks
26	264	Warren Hodges	Tackle	Chicago Cardinals
30	310	George Dick	End	Detroit Lions
