= 1943 Nebraska Cornhuskers football team =

American college football season

1943 Nebraska Cornhuskers football
- Conference: Big Six Conference
- Record: 2–6 (2–3 Big 6)
- Head coach: Adolph J. Lewandowski (1st season)
- Offensive scheme: T formation
- Home stadium: Memorial Stadium

1943 Big Six Conference football standings
	Conf.					Overall
Team	W		L		T	W		L		T
Oklahoma $	5	–	0	–	0	7	–	2	–	0
Missouri	3	–	2	–	0	3	–	5	–	0
Iowa State	3	–	2	–	0	4	–	4	–	0
Kansas	2	–	3	–	0	4	–	5	–	1
Nebraska	2	–	3	–	0	2	–	6	–	0
Kansas State	0	–	5	–	0	1	–	7	–	0
$ – Conference champion

The 1943 Nebraska Cornhuskers football team represented the University of Nebraska as a member of the Big Six Conference during the 1943 college football season. Led by first-year head coach Adolph J. Lewandowski, the Cornhuskers compiled an overall record of 2–6 with a mark of 2–3 in conference play, tying for fourth place in the Big 6. Nebraska played home games at Memorial Stadium in Lincoln, Nebraska.

In the final Litkenhous Ratings, Nebraska ranked 133rd among the nation's college and service teams with a rating of 57.0.

== Before the season ==
New Nebraska athletic director and head football coach Lewandowski assumed control of a Nebraska program in distress. World War II was dramatically impacting the way of life in the United States, which contributed at least in part to the change in fortunes for the Cornhuskers, although the Nebraska program was fortunate to still have a team on the field at all, as at least twenty major college programs suspended their football programs in 1943 due to the impacts of the war. Coming off the 3–7–0 1942 season, it would not take much to post an improvement if Nebraska could overcome the setbacks dealt over the past two seasons. Former Nebraska all-American star player and assistant coach Ed Weir also returned to the coaching staff this season after five years away, increasing hopes of a Cornhusker rebirth, though overall the coaching staff was reduced by more than half of its personnel from 1942.

== Schedule ==
Date	Time	Opponent	Site	Result	Attendance	Source
October 2	2:00 p.m.	at Minnesota*	Memorial Stadium; Minneapolis, MN (rivalry)	L 0–54	34,000	
October 9	2:00 p.m.	Indiana*	Memorial Stadium; Lincoln, NE	L 13–54		
October 16	2:30 p.m.	at Iowa State	Clyde Williams Field; Ames, IA (rivalry)	L 6–27	5,480	
October 23	2:00 p.m.	Kansas^{†}	Memorial Stadium; Lincoln, NE (rivalry)	W 7–6	3,500	
October 30	2:15 p.m.	at Missouri	Memorial Stadium; Columbia, MO (rivalry)	L 20–54		
November 6	2:00 p.m.	at Kansas State	Memorial Stadium; Manhattan, KS (rivalry)	W 13–7	3,500	
November 13		Pittsburgh*		Canceled		
November 20	2:00 p.m.	Iowa*	Memorial Stadium; Lincoln, NE (rivalry)	L 13–33		
November 27	2:00 p.m.	Oklahoma	Memorial Stadium; Lincoln, NE (rivalry)	L 7–26		
*Non-conference game; ^{†}Homecoming; All times are in Central time

== Roster ==
Abnore, Jim T Baker, Gordon #42 HB; Barrett, Jack PLAYER; Beaver, Clark HB; Chadderdon, Jim G Cullen, Dick E Dawson, Richard PLAYER; Dudley, Roland PLAYER; Eager, Earl HB; Ebers, Merle C Ellyson, Garold #45 FB; Ewin, Gordin #38 E Galter, Morris #17 C Gissler, Bert #10 E Goldstein, Robert #20 G Hansen, Jim #56 FB; Hazard, Frank #11 G Hiatt, Harry PLAYER; Hill, Bill T Hinz, Robert #54 G Hollins, Kenneth #49 FB; Jacupke, Gerald G Janssen, Art PLAYER; Johnston, Harry HB; Kearney, Phil #21 PLAYER; Kenfield, Ted QB; Kessler, Joe #59 QB	Kofton, Larry #27 T Kops, Lyle #35 T Kroger, John PLAYER; Lock, Norman T Lucas, George #16 E McDermott, Dick E Means, Arden G Miller, William #31 HB; Mitchell, Rex #24 FB; Moomaw, Bob PLAYER; Patton, Robert G Porter, Morton #22 G Rhodes, Melvin T Roland, Harold PLAYER; Rooney, Patrick #18 HB; Salisbury, Randall C Schindler, Robert #36 E Sherman, Melvin #28 E Smith, Charles #52 HB; Stewart, Bill PLAYER; Swanson, Kenneth #12 HB; Trant, Allen #19 HB; Trufholz, Cyril #30 PLAYER; Westover, Brooke PLAYER; Wilkins, Walter QB; Zlab, Dennis G

== Coaching staff ==
Name	Title	First year in this position	Years at Nebraska	Alma mater
Adolph J. Lewandowski	Head coach	1943	1937–1944	Nebraska
Ed Weir		1943	1926, 1929–1937, 1943	Nebraska
Arthur Sprague		1943	1943–1944	
Arch Stark		1943	1943	

== Game summaries ==
=== Minnesota ===
Nebraska at Minnesota

Team	1	2	Total
Nebraska			0
• Minnesota			54

- Date: October 2
- Location: Memorial Stadium • Minneapolis

The Golden Gophers brought Nebraska to Minneapolis and provided a harsh introduction to the 1943 season for the green and depleted Cornhusker team. Scoring on their first possession and leading 13–0 by the end of the first quarter, Minnesota never looked back as they handed Nebraska the worst loss in program history, a dominating 54–0 blanking. This shutout loss came in just the second game since Nebraska had set the previous program worst-loss record when they dropped a 0–46 decision to the Iowa Pre-Flight Seahawks in 1942. It was the third straight loss to Minnesota, as the Cornhuskers fell to 4–19–2 in the series.

=== Indiana ===
Indiana at Nebraska

Team	1	2	Total
• Indiana			54
Nebraska			13

- Date: October 9
- Location: Memorial Stadium • Lincoln, Nebraska

Reeling from the record-setting loss by Minnesota the week before, Nebraska met Indiana in Lincoln for the home opener. For the second game in a row, Nebraska's foe put up a record 54 points, but unlike the previous week, the Cornhuskers managed to produce some offense and put some scores in during the second half. It was Nebraska's third straight defeat in the series, as Indiana finally evened up the series at 3–3–2 against the Cornhuskers.

=== Iowa State ===
Nebraska at Iowa State

Team	1	2	Total
Nebraska			6
• Iowa State			27

- Date: October 16
- Location: Clyde Williams Field • Ames, Iowa
- Game attendance: 5,480

Nebraska opened conference play against Iowa State, a team that had fallen to the Cornhuskers in their last four meetings. It seemed that any hopes to stem the opening downward spiral were well-placed in this contest, and by the end of the first half the picture was much brighter than the earlier games, as the score was tied at 6–6. Nebraska was unable to score again in the second half, a difficulty not shared by Iowa State. Thus the Cyclones, by adding 21 points after the break, snapped their losing streak against Nebraska. The Cornhuskers were suffering a hard start to the season, coming away from this game with nothing but the series lead well-entrenched at 31–6–1. Although there were three earlier seasons that opened with two losses, this was the first team in Nebraska football history to post three straight opening losses.

=== Kansas ===
Kansas at Nebraska

Team	1	2	Total
Kansas			6
• Nebraska			7

- Date: October 23
- Location: Memorial Stadium • Lincoln, Nebraska
- Game weather: Rain

The downward fortunes of the Cornhusker squad probably contributed as much as the rain to the small turnout of spectators for the game, one of the smallest ever homecoming crowds in Lincoln. For the first time in the season, Nebraska held the lead in a game when they went up 7–0 to start out. Kansas responded before halftime but failed to convert the point after. Down by one point, the Jayhawks were held off by Nebraska for the rest of the game, allowing the Cornhuskers to escape with the season's first win, by one point. The victory was Nebraska's fifth straight against Kansas, and extended the number of seasons the Jayhawks had failed to get a win from the Cornhuskers to a record 27 straight meetings as they slipped in the series to 9–38–3.

=== Missouri ===
Nebraska at Missouri

Team	1	2	Total
Nebraska			20
• Missouri			54

- Date: October 30
- Location: Faurot Field • Columbia, Missouri

Missouri scored first and then never relinquished the lead. Although the Cornhuskers enjoyed their greatest offensive output of the season so far with 20 points scored on the day, the Tigers became the third team this season to score 54 points against the Cornhuskers, once again tying the most points ever scored against Nebraska. Missouri's win slightly narrowed the gap in their series with the Cornhuskers, bringing them up to 11–23–3. The Missouri–Nebraska Bell remained in Columbia for a third year.

=== Kansas State ===
Nebraska at Kansas State

Team	1	2	Total
• Nebraska			13
Kansas State			7

- Date: November 6
- Location: Memorial Stadium • Manhattan, Kansas
- Game weather: Rain

Playing a sloppy game in the rain, Nebraska grabbed at the advantage of starting out in the lead to try to keep up with the Wildcats. Successfully holding on to a 7–7 tie at the half, the Cornhuskers managed to outscore Kansas State 6–0 in the second half, though both teams failed to capitalize on numerous other opportunities. The Wildcats were pushed farther back in the series, to 4–22–2.

=== Pittsburgh ===
Due to wartime travel restrictions, the annual contest with bitter rival Pittsburgh was canceled.

=== Iowa ===
Iowa at Nebraska

Team	1	2	Total
• Iowa			33
Nebraska			13

- Date: November 20
- Location: Memorial Stadium • Lincoln, Nebraska

The Cornhuskers attempted to make a game of it, and in fact kept even with the Hawkeyes for a time with a mere one point 13–14 deficit, but the momentum fizzled out as Iowa ran away with three more touchdowns and the game to hang another loss on the beleaguered Nebraska squad and move to 9–20–3 overall between the teams.

=== Oklahoma ===
Oklahoma at Nebraska

Team	1	2	Total
• Oklahoma			26
Nebraska			7

- Date: November 27
- Location: Memorial Stadium • Lincoln, Nebraska

The 1943 season came to a close at Memorial Stadium with the Oklahoma Sooners visiting to wrap up the conference slate. Although historically the Sooners had struggled against Nebraska, it was a downtrodden Cornhusker squad they faced on this day. Without putting up much a fight, Nebraska slowly folded and Oklahoma pulled away to win by nineteen points, snapping their streak of four straight losses to the Cornhuskers. More importantly, it was the first time that the Sooners handed Nebraska defeat on the field in Lincoln, though at 14–6–3 to date in the series, they had a long way to go to catch Nebraska's lead.

== After the season ==
At the end of the previous season, a disappointing 3–7–0 (.350) campaign, it did not seem as if things could get any worse. The Cornhuskers had suffered occasional off years in the past, but now there had been three straight losing seasons suffered by a program that had never even suffered two consecutive losing seasons in the history of the program, with the 1943 final record of 2–6–0 (.250) an even lower mark than before and the second-worst single-season record in Nebraska history. Nebraska's overall football record slipped to 303–116–31 (.708) as the conference record fell to 109–22–11 (.806). The Nebraska Cornhuskers football team was entering a dark time.
