= 1944 Missouri Tigers football team =

American college football season

1944 Missouri Tigers football
- Conference: Big Six Conference
- Record: 3–5–2 (2–1–2 Big 6)
- Head coach: Chauncey Simpson (2nd season)
- Home stadium: Memorial Stadium

1944 Big Six Conference football standings
	Conf.					Overall
Team	W		L		T	W		L		T
Oklahoma $	4	–	0	–	1	6	–	3	–	1
Iowa State	3	–	1	–	1	6	–	1	–	1
Missouri	2	–	1	–	2	3	–	5	–	2
Nebraska	2	–	3	–	0	2	–	6	–	0
Kansas	1	–	4	–	0	3	–	6	–	1
Kansas State	1	–	4	–	0	2	–	5	–	2
$ – Conference champion

The 1944 Missouri Tigers football team was an American football team that represented the University of Missouri in the Big Six Conference (Big 6) during the 1944 college football season. The team compiled a 3–5–2 record (2–1–2 against Big 6 opponents), finished in third place in the Big 6, and outscored all opponents by a combined total of 224 to 176. Chauncey Simpson was the head coach for the second of three seasons. The team played its home games at Memorial Stadium in Columbia, Missouri.

The team's leading scorer was Paul Collins with 60 points.

== Schedule ==
Date	Opponent	Site	Result	Attendance	Source
September 23	vs. Arkansas*	Walsh Stadium; St. Louis, MO (rivalry)	L 6–7	8,500	
September 30	at No. 8 Ohio State*	Ohio Stadium; Columbus, OH	L 0–54	29,908	
October 7	at Kansas State	Memorial Stadium; Manhattan, KS	W 33–0		
October 14	at Minnesota*	Memorial Stadium; Minneapolis, MN	L 27–39	24,207	
October 21	Iowa State	Memorial Stadium; Columbia, MO (rivalry)	T 21–21	5,281	
October 28	at Nebraska	Memorial Stadium; Lincoln, NE (rivalry)	L 20–24	8,000	
November 4	Michigan State*	Memorial Stadium; Columbia, MO	W 13–7	5,000	
November 11	at Oklahoma	Memorial Stadium; Norman, OK (rivalry)	T 21–21		
November 18	Iowa Pre-Flight*	Memorial Stadium; Columbia, MO	L 7–51		
November 23	vs. Kansas	Blues Stadium; Kansas City, MO (rivalry)	W 28–0	19,969	
*Non-conference game; Rankings from AP Poll released prior to the game
