= 1943 Kansas State Wildcats football team =

American college football season

1943 Kansas State Wildcats football
- Conference: Big Six Conference
- Record: 1–7 (0–5 Big 6)
- Head coach: Ward Haylett (2nd season)
- Home stadium: Memorial Stadium

1943 Big Six Conference football standings
	Conf.					Overall
Team	W		L		T	W		L		T
Oklahoma $	5	–	0	–	0	7	–	2	–	0
Missouri	3	–	2	–	0	3	–	5	–	0
Iowa State	3	–	2	–	0	4	–	4	–	0
Kansas	2	–	3	–	0	4	–	5	–	1
Nebraska	2	–	3	–	0	2	–	6	–	0
Kansas State	0	–	5	–	0	1	–	7	–	0
$ – Conference champion

The 1943 Kansas State Wildcats football team represented Kansas State University in the 1943 college football season. The team's head football coach was Ward Haylett, in his second year at the helm of the Wildcats. The Wildcats played their home games in Memorial Stadium. The Wildcats finished the season with a 1–7 record with a 0–5 record in conference play. They finished in last place in the Big Six Conference. The Wildcats scored 48 points and gave up 209 points.

In the final Litkenhous Ratings, Kansas State ranked 185th among the nation's college and service teams with a rating of 42.4.

== Schedule ==
Date	Opponent	Site	Result	Attendance	Source
October 2	Washburn*	Memorial Stadium; Manhattan, KS	W 13–7	3,000	
October 9	at Missouri	Memorial Stadium; Columbia, MO	L 14–47	4,500	
October 16	William Jewell*	Memorial Stadium; Manhattan, KS	L 6–19	3,600	
October 23	Oklahoma	Memorial Stadium; Manhattan, KS	L 0–37	3,000	
October 30	at Kansas	Memorial Stadium; Lawrence, KS (rivalry)	L 2–25	2,500	
November 6	Nebraska^{†}	Memorial Stadium; Manhattan, KS (rivalry)	L 7–13	3,500	
November 12	Washburn*	Memorial Stadium; Manhattan, KS	L 6–13		
November 20	at Iowa State	Clyde Williams Field; Ames, IA (rivalry)	L 0–48	3,772	
*Non-conference game; ^{†}Homecoming
