= 1944 Nebraska Cornhuskers football team =

American college football season

1944 Nebraska Cornhuskers football
- Conference: Big Six Conference
- Record: 2–6 (2–3 Big 6)
- Head coach: Adolph J. Lewandowski (2nd season)
- Offensive scheme: T formation
- Home stadium: Memorial Stadium

1944 Big Six Conference football standings
	Conf.					Overall
Team	W		L		T	W		L		T
Oklahoma $	4	–	0	–	1	6	–	3	–	1
Iowa State	3	–	1	–	1	6	–	1	–	1
Missouri	2	–	1	–	2	3	–	5	–	2
Nebraska	2	–	3	–	0	2	–	6	–	0
Kansas	1	–	4	–	0	3	–	6	–	1
Kansas State	1	–	4	–	0	2	–	5	–	2
$ – Conference champion

The 1944 Nebraska Cornhuskers football team represented the University of Nebraska as a member of the Big Six Conference during the 1944 college football season. Led by Adolph J. Lewandowski in his second and final season as head coach, the Cornhuskers compiled an overall record of 2–6 with a mark of 2–3 in conference play, placing fourth in the Big 6. Nebraska played home games at Memorial Stadium in Lincoln, Nebraska.

== Before the season ==
World War II was dragging on, with the United States now in its third year since being drawn into the conflict. College sports programs across the nation were shorthanded with so many young men being drafted or enlisting into the armed forces, while all of the "service teams" that had entered the college football landscape, fielded by the branches of the armed forces, had the advantage of adding former players to their rosters. This gave the service teams the ability to concentrate the best former players into their programs, and at the end of 1944, service teams made up half of all of the ranked teams. It was in this environment of upheaval and disparity that a struggling Nebraska football team that had never previously suffered consecutive losing seasons was now returning from three losing campaigns in a row. Head coach Lewandowski was back for his second year, while also serving as Nebraska's athletic director, to see if he could reverse the fortunes of the Cornhusker football squad.

== Schedule ==
Date	Time	Opponent	Site	Result	Attendance	Source
September 30	2:00 p.m.	at Minnesota*	Memorial Stadium; Minneapolis, MN (rivalry)	L 0–39	21,876	
October 14	2:00 p.m.	at No. 19 Indiana*	Memorial Stadium; Bloomington, IN	L 0–54		
October 21	2:00 p.m.	at Kansas	Memorial Stadium; Lawrence, KS (rivalry)	L 0–20	7,342	
October 28	2:00 p.m.	Missouri	Memorial Stadium; Lincoln, NE (rivalry)	W 24–20	8,000	
November 4	2:00 p.m.	at Iowa*	Iowa Stadium; Iowa City, IA (rivalry)	L 6–27		
November 11	2:00 p.m.	Iowa State	Memorial Stadium; Lincoln, NE (rivalry)	L 6–19	7,263	
November 25	2:00 p.m.	Kansas State	Memorial Stadium; Lincoln, NE (rivalry)	W 35–0		
December 2	2:00 p.m.	vs. Oklahoma	Taft Stadium; Oklahoma City, OK (rivalry)	L 12–31		
*Non-conference game; Rankings from AP Poll released prior to the game; All times are in Central time

== Roster ==
Berkey, Duane C Berquist, William G Betz, Bill #13 HB; Bryant, Jack #34 HB; Buckley, Winton #67 HB; Burroughs, Bob QB; Colerick, Lyle #19 E Collopy, Frank FB; Dedrick, Jack QB; Denker, Bill PLAYER; Dermann, Kenneth G Doyle, Keith C Ebers, Merle C Fish, Wayne #33 PLAYER; Fowler, Dave QB; Gissler, Bert #10 E Gradoville, Edward #26 HB; Grundman, Allen G Hazard, Frank G Hollins, Kenneth FB; Hoover, John E Johnson, John T Kasdan, Bernie G Kenyon, Francis FB; Kessler, Joe #12 QB; Knight, Charles #15 HB; Koch, Dick HB; Koenig, Robert E Kops, Lyle T Kovanda, Keith T	Lamberty, Dick HB; Legino, Ed PLAYER; Lorenz, Fred T Lowry, Bob T Major, Ralph #17 E Martz, Stanley G Mauser, Murl HB; McDowell, Ben E Megill, Larry PLAYER; Mountford, Roger #39 FB; Nelson, Douglas HB; Ostenberg, Clyde C Pegler, Don G Perdew, Bill HB; Peterson, Charles T Pollat, Bruce T Price, Bernard G Robb, Owen PLAYER; Schleiger, Robert E Scoville, Bob E Selzer, John #29 HB; Smallfoot, Bob PLAYER; Stein, Ken PLAYER; Stevenson, John G Stoetzel, Pete G Strahan, Jim #27 HB; Strickland, Ed T Tyson, Ben C Wolf, Dean PLAYER; Yanney, Jim PLAYER

== Coaching staff ==
Name	Title	First year in this position	Years at Nebraska	Alma mater
Adolph J. Lewandowski	Head coach	1943	1937–1944	Nebraska
Charles Armstrong		1937	1937–1942, 1944	
Arthur Sprague		1943	1943–1944	
Jerry Adam		1944	1944	

== Game summaries ==
=== Minnesota ===
Nebraska at Minnesota

Team	1	2	Total
Nebraska			0
• Minnesota			39

- Date: September 30
- Location: Memorial Stadium • Minneapolis
- Game attendance: 21,876

The new season did not start off on a good note, as Nebraska was completely unable to stop the Golden Gophers, who rolled over the Cornhuskers to post 33 unanswered points in the first half. It may have been that Nebraska's halftime adjustments slowed down Minnesota's assault, or perhaps the Gophers simply backed off, but even though Minnesota's scoring slowed in the second half, the Cornhuskers never were able to put up points. For the second year in a row, Minnesota handed Nebraska an opening shutout loss, the 20th Golden Gopher victory over the Cornhuskers and improving in the series to 20–4–2, setting the tone for what looked like might be another year of heartbreak.

=== Indiana ===
Nebraska at #19 Indiana

Team	1	2	Total
Nebraska			0
• #19 Indiana			54

- Date: October 14
- Location: Memorial Stadium • Bloomington, Indiana

Nebraska's only bright spot in this game was a single 55-yard running play in a contest that was otherwise all Indiana. The Hoosiers kept the Cornhuskers off the scoreboard even as they repeated their record-setting 54 points scored on Nebraska, which was the fourth time in two years that the 54 mark was hung on the Cornhuskers and was a repeat of Nebraska's worst-ever defeat, matching the 54–0 shutout handed down by Minnesota last year. With four wins in a row against Nebraska so far, Indiana finally took the series lead between the teams at 4–3–2.

=== Kansas ===
Nebraska at Kansas

Team	1	2	Total
Nebraska			0
• Kansas			20

- Date: October 21
- Location: Memorial Stadium • Lawrence, Kansas

The 1944 loss to the Kansas Jayhawks was a particularly painful and heartbreaking loss. As the Cornhuskers were held scoreless for the third game in a row to open the season, a dubious mark that had never before fallen upon Nebraska, worse still was the end of Nebraska's 27-game undefeated streak against the Jayhawks that began with a 13–3 Nebraska victory in 1917. It was also the first time that Kansas had defeated the Cornhuskers in Lincoln since an 18–4 victory dating back to 1896, making this one of the darkest days in the history of the program. This was the 10th win for the Jayhawks over Nebraska all time, though they still lagged in the series 10–38–3.

=== Missouri ===
Missouri at Nebraska

Team	1	2	Total
Missouri			20
• Nebraska			24

- Date: October 28
- Location: Memorial Stadium • Lincoln, Nebraska
- Game attendance: 8,000

The previous loss to Kansas marked one of the lowest points in program history, but Nebraska overcame any discouragement remaining and unexpectedly sprung to life against a heavily favored Missouri team in front of a small homecoming crowd in Lincoln. Playing somewhat like the Nebraska of old, several big plays went in favor of the Cornhuskers and allowed them to take their first victory of 1944, in what would be the brightest spot of the season. As Nebraska improved in the series to 24–11–3, the Missouri-Nebraska Bell should have been returned to Lincoln after its three-year stint in Columbia. However, amidst the weariness of the war overhanging the nation, the trading of the bell to the winner of this series was overlooked, and the bell passed for a short time into forgotten history.

=== Iowa ===
Nebraska at Iowa

Team	1	2	Total
Nebraska			6
• Iowa			27

- Date: November 4
- Location: Iowa Stadium • Iowa City, Iowa

Nebraska was unable to score in this contest until within the final five minutes, as another loss was added to the 1944 record. Adding insult to injury was that one of the scores tallied against the Cornhuskers was put over by a former Nebraska player now on the Iowa roster. Though they avoided the shutout, the Cornhuskers gave up what would be Iowa's 10th win in the series, allowing them to chip away at Nebraska's 20–10–3 series lead.

=== Iowa State ===
Iowa State at Nebraska

Team	1	2	Total
• Iowa State			19
Nebraska			6

- Date: November 11
- Location: Memorial Stadium • Lincoln, Nebraska
- Game attendance: 7,263

The Cornhuskers were having enough trouble trying to remain competitive, but entered this game with three starters out with injuries, and then lost another in the first quarter of this game. Unsurprisingly, with the odds stacked against them, the day ended with another Nebraska loss as the Cyclones added another win to their 7–31–1 series record.

=== Kansas State ===
Kansas State at Nebraska

Team	1	2	Total
Kansas State			0
• Nebraska			35

- Date: November 25
- Location: Memorial Stadium • Lincoln, Nebraska
- Game weather: Rain/Snow

If fortunes for Nebraska were down, then certainly it was telling about the Kansas State program that the Wildcats could allow the Cornhuskers to hang a 35–0 shutout defeat on them. It was the most points scored by Nebraska since a 53–2 defeat of Kansas in 1940, and the win helped the struggling Cornhuskers improve to 23–4–2, to stay well ahead of Kansas State in the series.

=== Oklahoma ===
Nebraska vs. Oklahoma

Team	1	2	3	4	Total
Nebraska	0	0	0	12	12
• Oklahoma	7	18	0	6	31

- Date: December 2
- Location: Oklahoma City, Oklahoma

Oklahoma launched into a strong 25–0 lead by the half to put the game essentially out of reach, but Nebraska made a respectable effort in the final quarter by outscoring the Sooners 12–6. Oklahoma's victory was their second in a row over Nebraska, which moved them forward slightly in the series to 5–16–3.

== After the season ==
Nebraska continued to fall into a tailspin, with each year seeming no better, and sometimes worse, than the last. The Cornhuskers had now strung together four straight losing seasons, a bleak picture for a program not used to having even one occasional isolated losing campaign. Coach Lewandowski repeated his 1943 overall and league records in 1944, bringing his overall Nebraska career total to just 4–12–0 (.250), with a slightly better Big 6 total of 4–6–0 (.400). Nebraska's overall program now stood at 305–122–31 (.700) with a conference record of 111–25–11 (.793).

Coach Lewandowski, in his role as athletic director, decided that change was needed in the program, and swept the entire coaching staff out of the program, including himself. Brought aboard following 1944 was storied football coach George Clark, a player for two colleges and then two military teams prior to starting his coaching career in 1916. Clark had also served in both world wars, and his appointment at Nebraska followed his return home to the United States.

To his credit, Coach Lewandowski's leadership allowed Nebraska football to continue uninterrupted through World War II even as numerous other schools suspended their programs for a time. With limited resources, sparse rosters, through rationing and travel restrictions, his guidance kept the program's continuous history intact.
