= 1943 Wisconsin Badgers football team =

American college football season

1943 Wisconsin Badgers football
- Conference: Big Ten Conference
- Record: 1–9 (1–6 Big Ten)
- Head coach: Harry Stuhldreher (8th season)
- MVP: Joe Keenan
- Captain: Joe Keenan
- Home stadium: Camp Randall Stadium

1943 Big Ten Conference football standings
	Conf.					Overall
Team	W		L		T	W		L		T
No. 5 Purdue +	6	–	0	–	0	9	–	0	–	0
No. 3 Michigan +	6	–	0	–	0	8	–	1	–	0
No. 9 Northwestern	5	–	1	–	0	6	–	2	–	0
Indiana	2	–	3	–	1	4	–	4	–	2
Minnesota	2	–	3	–	0	5	–	4	–	0
Illinois	2	–	4	–	0	3	–	7	–	0
Ohio State	1	–	4	–	0	3	–	6	–	0
Wisconsin	1	–	6	–	0	1	–	9	–	0
Iowa	0	–	4	–	1	1	–	6	–	1
+ – Conference co-champions; Rankings from AP Poll

The 1943 Wisconsin Badgers football team was an American football team that represented the University of Wisconsin in the 1943 Big Ten Conference football season. The team compiled a 1–9 record (1–6 against conference opponents) and finished in eighth place in the Big Ten Conference. Harry Stuhldreher was in his eighth year as Wisconsin's head coach.

Center Joe Keenan received the team's most valuable player award. Keenan was also the team captain. Ray Dooney led the Big Ten with an average of 39.0 yards per punt.

In the final Litkenhous Ratings, Wisconsin ranked 46th among the nation's college and service teams with a rating of 84.6.

The team played its home games at Camp Randall Stadium. During the 1943 season, the average attendance at home games was 14,374.

== Schedule ==
Date	Opponent	Site	Result	Attendance	Source
September 18	Marquette*	Camp Randall Stadium; Madison, WI	L 7–33	22,000	
September 25	at Camp Grant*	Camp Grant; Rockford, IL	L 7–10	11,000	
October 2	at Iowa	Iowa Stadium; Iowa City, IA (rivalry)	W 7–5		
October 9	Illinois	Camp Randall Stadium; Madison, WI	L 7–25	17,000	
October 16	No. 1 Notre Dame*	Camp Randall Stadium; Madison, WI	L 0–50	16,235	
October 23	at Indiana	Memorial Stadium; Bloomington, IN	L 0–34		
October 30	No. 4 Purdue	Camp Randall Stadium; Madison, WI	L 0–32	10,000	
November 6	No. 12 Northwestern^{†}	Camp Randall Stadium; Madison, WI	L 0–41		
November 13	at No. 4 Michigan	Michigan Stadium; Ann Arbor, MI	L 0–27	15,047	
November 20	at Minnesota	Memorial Stadium; Minneapolis, MN (rivalry)	L 13–25	20,000	
*Non-conference game; ^{†}Homecoming; Rankings from AP Poll released prior to the game
