= 1943 Iowa State Cyclones football team =

American college football season

1943 Iowa State Cyclones football
- Conference: Big Six Conference
- Record: 4–4 (3–2 Big 6)
- Head coach: Mike Michalske (2nd season)
- Captain: None
- Home stadium: Clyde Williams Field

1943 Big Six Conference football standings
	Conf.					Overall
Team	W		L		T	W		L		T
Oklahoma $	5	–	0	–	0	7	–	2	–	0
Missouri	3	–	2	–	0	3	–	5	–	0
Iowa State	3	–	2	–	0	4	–	4	–	0
Kansas	2	–	3	–	0	4	–	5	–	1
Nebraska	2	–	3	–	0	2	–	6	–	0
Kansas State	0	–	5	–	0	1	–	7	–	0
$ – Conference champion

The 1943 Iowa State Cyclones football team represented Iowa State College of Agricultural and Mechanic Arts (later renamed Iowa State University) in the Big Six Conference during the 1943 college football season. In their second year under head coach Mike Michalske, the Cyclones compiled a 4–4 record (3–2 against conference opponents), finished in third place in the conference, and outscored their opponents by a combined total of 147 to 104. They played their home games at Clyde Williams Field in Ames, Iowa. The Cyclones moved their kickoff times from 2 p.m. to 2:30 p.m. for the 1943 season.

The team's statistical leaders included Meredith Warner with 401 rushing yards and 31 points scored (three touchdowns and 13 extra points), Howard Tippee with 637 passing yards, and Hal Crisler with 139 receiving yards. Tippee was the only Iowa State player to be selected as a first-team all-conference player. There was no team captain selected for the 1943 season.

In the final Litkenhous Ratings, Iowa State ranked 70th among the nation's college and service teams with a rating of 75.2.

== Schedule ==
Date	Time	Opponent	Site	Result	Attendance	Source
October 2	2:30 p.m.	Iowa Pre-Flight*	Clyde Williams Field; Ames, IA	L 13–33	5,374	
October 9	2:30 p.m.	at Kansas	Memorial Stadium; Lawrence, KS	W 13–6	3,992	
October 16	2:30 p.m.	Nebraska	Clyde Williams Field; Ames, IA (rivalry)	W 27–6	5,480	
October 23	8:00 p.m.	at Ottumwa NAS*	Ottumwa, IA	L 12–13	2,712–4,500	
October 30	2:30 p.m.	at Oklahoma	Oklahoma Memorial Stadium; Norman, OK	L 7–21	5,170	
November 6	2:30 p.m.	Missouri^{†}	Clyde Williams Field; Ames, IA (rivalry)	L 7–25	4,490	
November 13	2:30 p.m.	Drake*	Clyde Williams Field; Ames, IA	W 20–0	4,750	
November 20	2:30 p.m.	Kansas State	Clyde Williams Field; Ames, IA (rivalry)	W 48–0	3,772	
*Non-conference game; ^{†}Homecoming; All times are in Central time
