= Ward Haylett =

American football player and coach (1895–1990)

Biographical details
- Born: September 20, 1895; Willow Springs, Missouri, U.S.
- Died: November 1, 1990 (aged 95)

Coaching career (HC unless noted)

Football
- 1924–1927: Doane
- 1942–1944: Kansas State

Basketball
- 1918–1919: Doane
- 1924–1928: Doane

Head coaching record
- Overall: 23–32–6 (football); 52–31 (basketball)

Accomplishments and honors

Awards
- Kansas State Hall of Fame (1990)

Ward H. Haylett (September 20, 1895 – November 1, 1990) was an American football, basketball, track and field, and cross country running coach. Haylett served as the head football coach at Doane College—now known as Doane University—in Crete, Nebraska from 1924 to 1927 and Kansas State College of Agriculture and Applied Science—now known as Kansas State University compiling a career college football coaching record of 23–32–6. He was enshrined in the National Track and Field Hall of Fame in 1979.

== Early life and playing career ==
Haylett was born in Willow Springs, Missouri, and graduated from Doane College—now known as Doane University—in Crete, Nebraska, in 1918. He earned 16 letters in several sports at Doane. He was the center on the basketball team, the quarterback on the football team, a pitcher for the baseball team and a quarter-mile and half-mile sprinter for the track team.

== Track coaching career ==
After graduating from college, Ward Haylett coached track and field at the high school level in Clay Center, Nebraska, for five years. He then coached track for the next five years at Doane College.

In 1928, Haylett moved to Kansas State University, in Manhattan, Kansas, where he coached track for the next 35 years, from 1928 to 1963. His Kansas State teams won seven conference championships. One of his top athletes at Kansas State was sprinter Thane Baker, who captured three medals, including one gold, at the 1956 Olympics. Another notable athlete was Elmer Hackney, who was the national collegiate shot put champion in 1938 and 1939. Haylett highlighted his coaching career by serving as an assistant coach on the 1948 Olympic team. Haylett was also head coach of the U.S. track and field team for the test Pan-American Games in 1937, and a three-time member of the United States Olympic Committee.

Track and field meets are named in his honor at both Doane College and Kansas State University. Haylett was inducted into the National Track and Field Hall of Fame and the Helms Athletic Foundation Hall of Fame.

== Football coaching career ==
=== Doane ===
Haylett was the 20th head football coach at Doane College. He held that position for four seasons, from 1924 until 1927. His coaching record at Doane was 17–12–4.

=== Kansas State ===
Fifteen years after coaching his last college football game at Doane, Haylett returned to the sidelines during a manpower shortage in World War II, becoming the 19th head football coach for the Kansas State Wildcats from 1942 until 1944. His overall coaching record at Kansas State was 6–20–2.

== Head coaching record ==
=== Football ===
Year	Team	Overall	Conference	Standing
Doane Tigers (Nebraska College Athletic Conference) (1924–1927)
1924	Doane	1–6–1	1–6–1	T–9th
1925	Doane	5–3	5–3	5th
1926	Doane	5–2–2	5–2–1	5th
1927	Doane	6–1–1	5–0–1	2nd
Doane:		17–12–4	16–11–3	
Kansas State Wildcats (Big Six Conference) (1942–1944)
1942	Kansas State	3–8	2–3	4th
1943	Kansas State	1–7	0–5	6th
1944	Kansas State	2–5–2	1–4	T–5th
Kansas State:		4–21–2	3–12	
Total:		4–21–2		
