= 1943 Ohio State Buckeyes football team =

American college football season

1943 Ohio State Buckeyes football
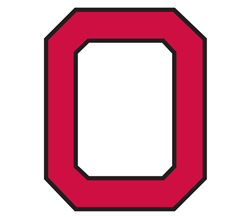
- Conference: Big Ten Conference
- Record: 3–6 (1–4 Big Ten)
- Head coach: Paul Brown (3rd season)
- MVP: Gordon Appleby
- Home stadium: Ohio Stadium

1943 Big Ten Conference football standings
	Conf.					Overall
Team	W		L		T	W		L		T
No. 5 Purdue +	6	–	0	–	0	9	–	0	–	0
No. 3 Michigan +	6	–	0	–	0	8	–	1	–	0
No. 9 Northwestern	5	–	1	–	0	6	–	2	–	0
Indiana	2	–	3	–	1	4	–	4	–	2
Minnesota	2	–	3	–	0	5	–	4	–	0
Illinois	2	–	4	–	0	3	–	7	–	0
Ohio State	1	–	4	–	0	3	–	6	–	0
Wisconsin	1	–	6	–	0	1	–	9	–	0
Iowa	0	–	4	–	1	1	–	6	–	1
+ – Conference co-champions; Rankings from AP Poll

The 1943 Ohio State Buckeyes football team represented Ohio State University in the 1943 Big Ten Conference football season. The Buckeyes compiled a 3–6 record being outscored 149–187. Head coach Paul Brown finished his three-year tenure with an 18–8–1 overall record and a 1–1–1 mark against Michigan.

In the final Litkenhous Ratings, Ohio State ranked 17th among the nation's college and service teams with a rating of 99.3.

== Schedule ==
Date	Opponent	Rank	Site	Result	Attendance	Source
September 25	Iowa Pre-Flight*		Ohio Stadium; Columbus, OH	L 13–28	23,496	
October 2	Missouri*		Ohio Stadium; Columbus, OH	W 27–6	27,525	
October 9	at No. 12 Great Lakes Navy*	No. 18	Ross Field; North Chicago, IL	L 6–13	22,000	
October 16	vs. No. 5 Purdue		Cleveland Stadium; Cleveland, OH	L 7-30	41,509	
October 23	No. 17 Northwestern		Ohio Stadium; Columbus, OH	L 0–13	37,243	
October 30	Indiana		Ohio Stadium; Columbus, OH	L 14–20	25,458	
November 6	at Pittsburgh*		Pitt Stadium; Pittsburgh, PA	W 46–6	30,000	
November 13	Illinois		Ohio Stadium; Columbus, OH (Illibuck)	W 29–26	36,331	
November 20	at No. 4 Michigan		Michigan Stadium; Ann Arbor, MI (rivalry)	L 7–45	39,139	
*Non-conference game; Rankings from AP Poll released prior to the game

== Rankings ==
Ranking movements Legend: ██ Increase in ranking ██ Decrease in ranking — = Not ranked
	Week								
Poll	1	2	3	4	5	6	7	8	Final
AP	18	—	—	—	—	—	—	—	—

== Coaching staff ==
- Paul Brown, head coach, third year

== 1944 NFL draftees ==
Player	Round	Pick	Position	NFL club
Paul Sarringhaus	9	80	Halfback	Philadelphia Eagles
Bob Shaw	10	97	End	Cleveland Rams
Lin Houston	11	106	Guard	Chicago Bears
Charley Csuri	16	154	Tackle	Chicago Cardinals
