= Elmer Burnham =

American football player and coach (1894–1977)

- Burnham pictured in Debris 1943, Purdue yearbook

Biographical details
- Born: September 8, 1894; West Newbury, Massachusetts, U.S.
- Died: March 9, 1977 (aged 82); Rochester, New York, U.S.

Playing career
- 1910s: Springfield

Coaching career (HC unless noted)
- 1916–1934: South Bend Central HS (IN)
- 1935–1941: Purdue (freshmen)
- 1942–1943: Purdue
- 1944–1960: Rochester (NY)

Head coaching record
- Overall: 92–56–6 (college); 118–30–8 (high school)

Accomplishments and honors

Championships
- 1 Big Ten (1943)

Elmer Harold Burnham (September 8, 1894 – March 9, 1977) was an American football coach and all-around athlete, known particularly for his basketball skills both in college and in amateur YMCA play in Indiana. He was the head football coach at Purdue University in 1942 and 1943. Burnham's 1943 Purdue squad went 9–0 and shared the Big Ten Conference title with Michigan. From 1944 to 1960, Burnham served as the head coach at the University of Rochester, where he compiled a record of 82–48–6 in 17 seasons. Burnham served as Purdue's freshman football coach for seven years before assuming the role as varsity head coach in 1942. Before coming to Purdue, Burnham coached football at Central High School in South Bend, Indiana, for 16 seasons, tallying a mark of 118–30–8.

== Early life, education, and YMCA work ==
Elmer Harold Burnham was born on September 8, 1894, at his family's home at 154 Main Street, West Newbury, Massachusetts. He was the only son among four children of Benjamin Franklin Burnham (a milkman) and Mary Choate Stanley Burnham. Burnham's athletic ability was evident from an early age. He won track and field events at local YMCA meets, played high school basketball, captained his high school baseball team. Burnham did not play high school football because West Newbury was too small to field a team. When playing local league baseball at 17, he was described as "[w]ithout a doubt the best amateur infielder in this vicinity," having begun playing "as soon as he was big enough to lift a bat." Decades after his playing days ended, Burnham was called "an exceptional athlete, possibly the best West Newbury High ever had," who could have done well in a much larger school.

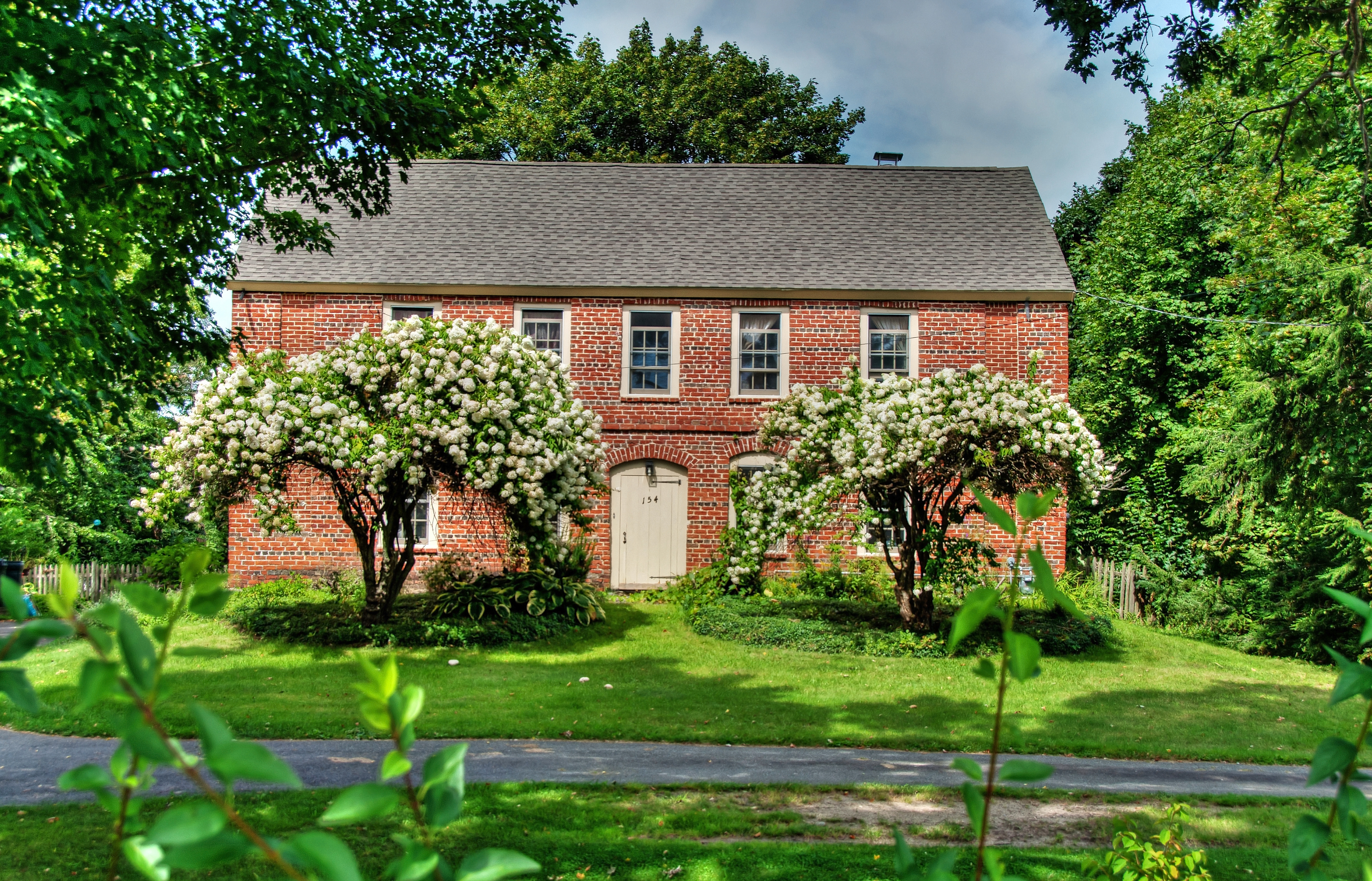
Burnham Family Home, West Newbury, Massachusetts

After graduating high school in 1911 (as a classmate of noted WAC commander Captain Frances Keegan Marquis), Burnham entered Springfield Training School, a Springfield, Massachusetts, college closely connected to the YMCA and known for its strong physical education program. In August 1913, after two years' study at Springfield, Burnham became an assistant athletics director of South Bend, Indiana's YMCA. Advisors at Springfield suggested the year's break because Burnham was so youthful in appearance, they doubted they could place him in a coaching position.

Burnham returned to Springfield in the 1915-16 school year to complete his physical education training, where he won letters in football, baseball, tennis, and basketball, starring particularly in the latter. In 1924-25, he attended coaching schools under famed University of Notre Dame football coach Knute Rockne, with whom Burnham had worked on South Bend community sports events as early as 1917. At the time of Burnham's graduation, Springfield offered only a three-year program: in 1935 he completed coursework to obtain a bachelor's degree in physical education from Notre Dame.

== Coaching career ==
In a career not known for job security, Burnham served for years at each school where he coached, always leaving on good terms and on his own terms. His decades of high school and college coaching in Indiana were appreciated by "all Hoosiers, who have come to call him one of their own," and in 1975 Burnham was inducted into the Indiana Football Hall of Fame. In Rochester, New York, he was viewed as "a quiet, modest man," respected and admired by those on his teams: "There has been a lot of silly talk about the character building purposes of football. When Elmer Burnham is mentioned in this connection, it doesn't sound so silly."

=== Central High School ===
In 1916, Burnham was appointed coach at South Bend's Central High School, where, in addition to teaching phys ed, he coached all sports, developing strong teams from the outset. Opened in 1913, Central High was an important South Bend institution: a place of civic pride not only in its impressive size and architecture but also for its successful sports teams. With the exception of the school years 1917-18 (when he served as a sergeant in the 309th Trench Mortar Battery during World War I) and 1920-21 (when he returned to West Newbury, staying with his parents and working with his father in the family dairy) Burnham coached steadily at Central High School until 1935, becoming a South Bend institution himself: as one columnist stated, "Many of the young, successful business men of South Bend today received their early training from Elmer Burnham."

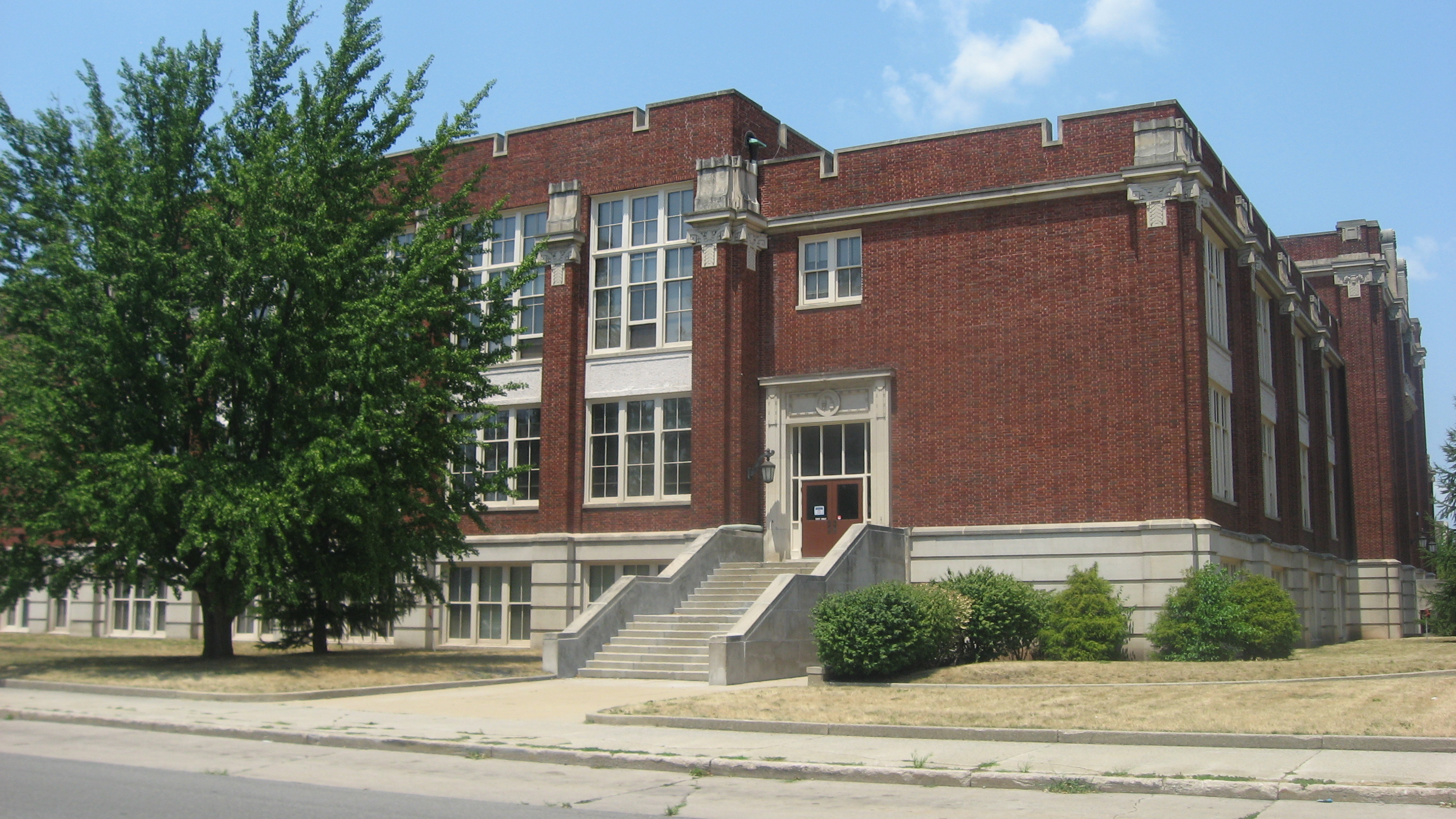
Central High School, South Bend, Indiana

During Burnham's tenure at the high school, South Bend took off as a manufacturing hub. The city's population grew from 58,684 in 1910 to 70,983 in 1920 to 104,193 in 1930. Central High School—and its athletic program—grew as well. In early years at Central, Burnham was one of only two phys ed teachers, coaching a range of high school sports (taking his football, basketball, baseball, and track teams to championships), while also starring on the South Bend YMCA basketball team and serving as City Recreational Director.

Later, Burnham was particularly known as the high school's football coach. In his last five years, the Central football team "won 42 games, lost six and tied five, scoring 1,083 points against their opponents' 181." By 1934 Central's coaching program had been revamped and several new coaches had been added, including an English teacher and basketball coach named John Wooden, who succeeded Burnham as baseball coach and in the South Bend city recreation job, and whose subsequent basketball coaching career at the University of California, Los Angeles earned him the sobriquet "Wizard of Westwood." As Burnham was leaving in 1935 to coach at Purdue University, South Bend held a testimonial banquet in his honor, attended by 400 friends and admirers.

=== Purdue ===
==== Freshman football coach ====
In the spring of 1935, Purdue athletic director/head football coach Noble Kizer, with whom Burnham played basketball at the South Bend YMCA, recruited Burnham as Purdue's freshman football coach. Burnham was credited as "largely responsible for making such successful Purdue football teams" and as the "best freshman football coach in the country." During his time as Purdue's freshman coach, Burnham, viewed as an authority on recreational sports, helped develop a state-wide amateur baseball program in Indiana, and gave speeches on a variety of sports topics.

==== Head football coach ====
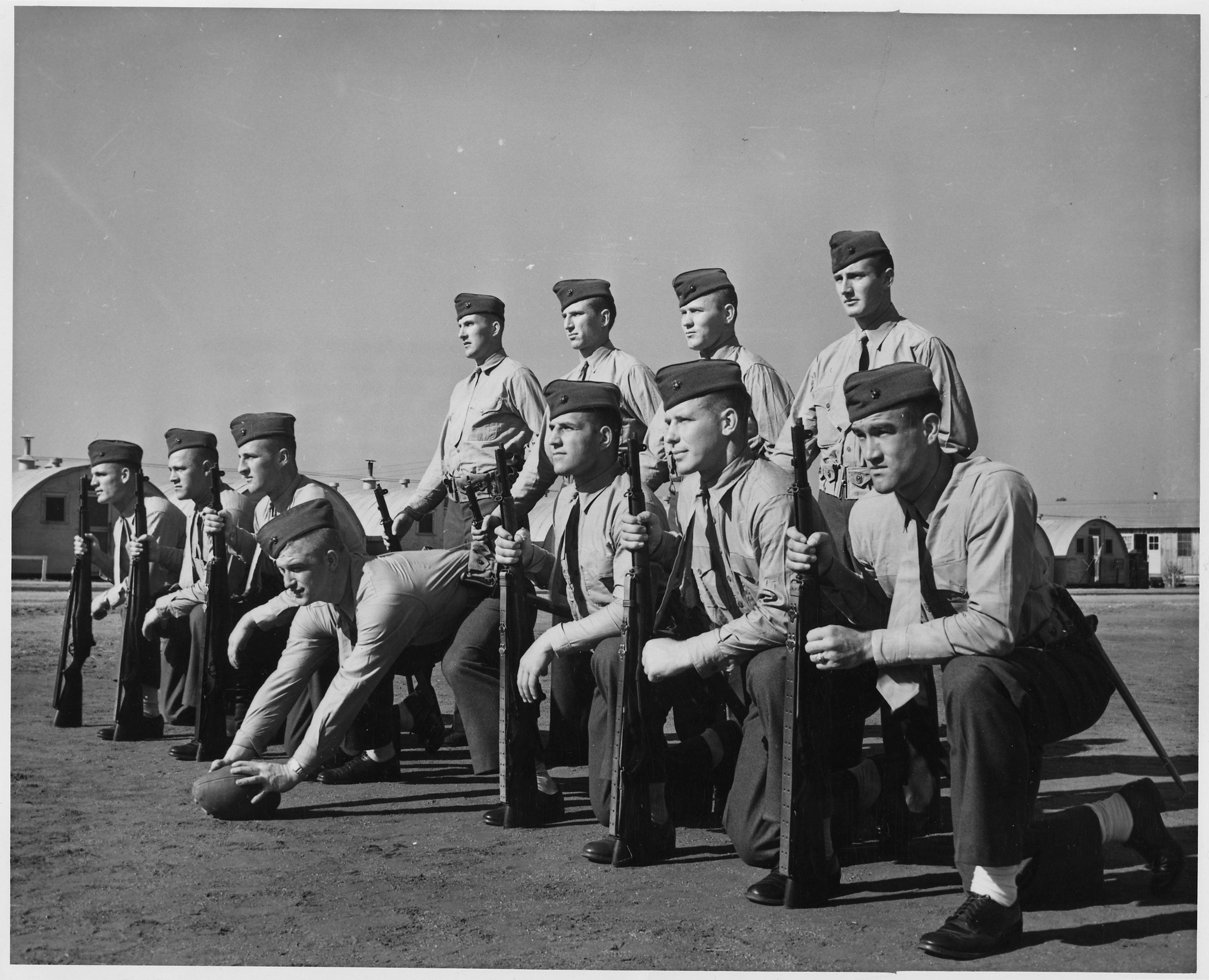
Eleven nationally recognized football players, including Alex Agase, 5th from left, and Tony Butkovich, 2d from right, both from Purdue (originally Illinois), training as Marines at Paris Island, South Carolina

Burnham's ascendancy to Purdue's head football coach position in February 1942 came in inauspicious circumstances. America had entered World War II after the attack on Pearl Harbor in December 1941. Both coaching and player rosters changed as men began to join the service. And the military took an active role in college football during the war, transferring players among schools with orders to report in different locations and building its own elite training base teams, which included some professional players.

At the same time, the Purdue Boilermakers football program was in turmoil. In January 1942, Mal Elward had been removed as the school's athletic director because of the football team's poor 1941 performance, but was to stay on as the football coach for the remainder of the year. The college newspaper called Elward's retention a betrayal, stating that he was widely and deeply unpopular: "Members of the team had vowed they would no longer play if Elward remained." Thereupon Elward resigned to join the Navy, and within a month Burnham—a well-known and popular figure in Boilermakers football—became head coach.

===== 1942 season =====
As the 1942 football season approached, sportswriters noted that Purdue's morale had improved with the new coaching staff and the introduction of new formations and plays, but warned that the Boilermakers faced a daunting schedule. With the exception of a 7-6 upset over Northwestern University, Purdue's 1942 season was one of losses. Burnham committed to "do better next season, if there is college football."

===== 1943 season =====
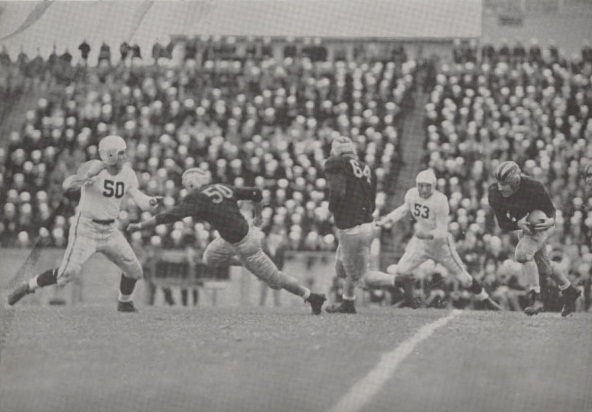
In a 1943 game, Tony Butkovich at far right carries the ball for Purdue

The one sure thing in the 1943 football season was uncertainty. Burnham and Purdue's athletic director considered suspending football that year, but in April spring drills proceeded with the knowledge that many players could be gone before the season started. Burnham said, "Most of the boys won't be with us this fall, but they are out here every afternoon because of their love of the game and a desire to maintain themselves in top-notch physical condition. I only hope that the training we have been able to provide will make them better soldiers, sailors, or marines." In August, thanks in good measure to transplants from Illinois and Missouri, as well as the Navy's V-12 officer training program at Purdue, Burnham was confronted with a record-breaking 113-man squad of football aspirants, a cohort so large it was split into two groups for training. This 1943 Boilermakers football team proved unbeatable.

Burnham's final football game at Purdue was the traditional season-culminating battle for the Old Oaken Bucket trophy passed between Purdue and arch-rival Indiana University. The year before, the Indiana Hoosiers handed Purdue a 20-0 defeat, the third in three years. On November 20, 1943, the Boilermakers beat the Hoosiers 7-0 at Indiana's Bloomington home stadium. This gave Purdue not only the Old Oaken Bucket, but also an undefeated season and a tie with the University of Michigan for the Big Ten Conference championship.

By such measures as first downs, forwards completed, yards lost on penalties, Indiana played a better game. The Hoosiers came within inches of a touchdown several times, as late as the last minutes of the game, but were frustrated in each attempt. It was the first time Indiana had been held scoreless since 1939. One writer summed up: "The only punch Indiana was able to display in the vicinity of Purdue's goal line ... was a roundhouse right to [Purdue quarterback] Sam Vacanti's jaw, swung by [Indiana quarterback] John Cannady on the last play of the game...."

=== Rochester ===
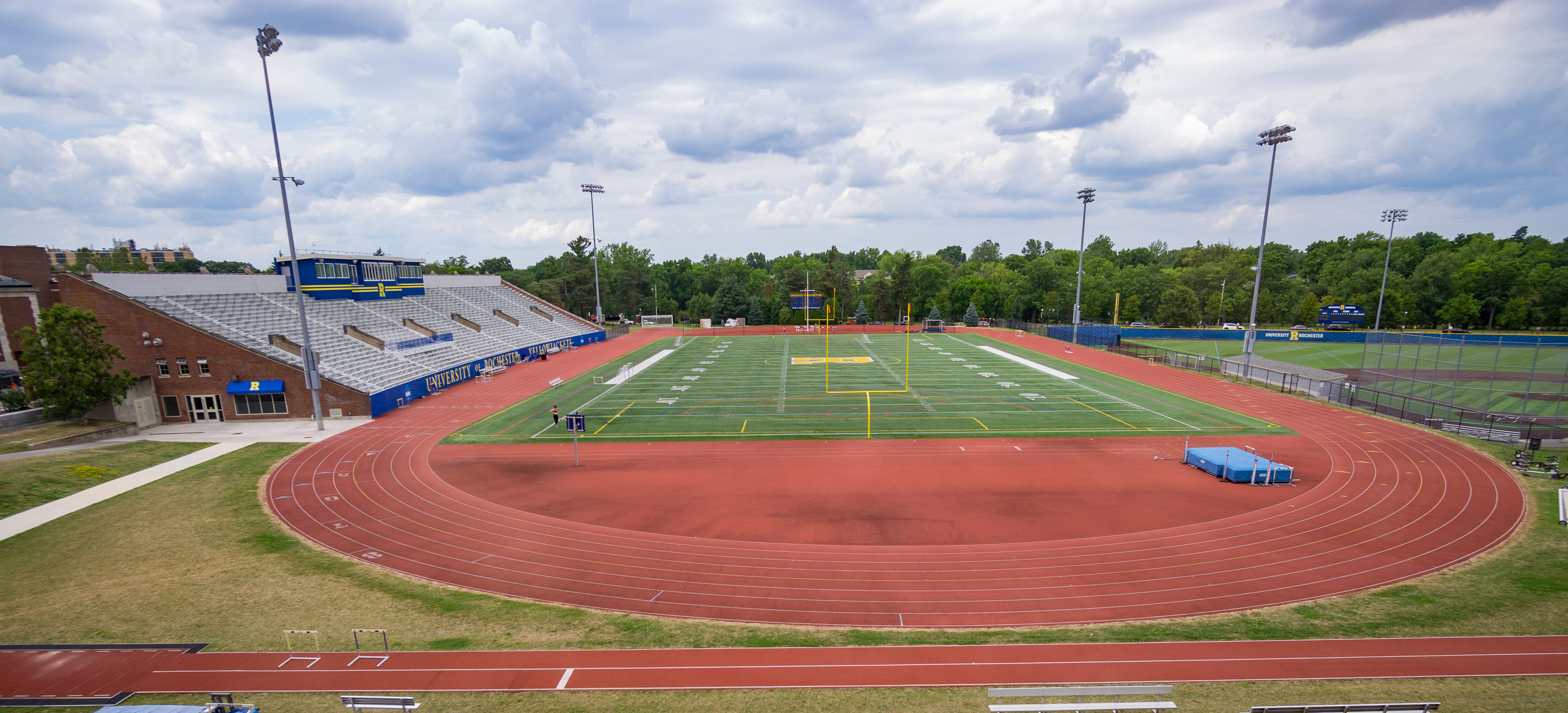
University of Rochester's Fauver Stadium, where Burnham coached football

In May 1944, Burnham accepted the positions of head football coach and associate professor of physical education at the University of Rochester, a private research university in upstate New York, which offered him more money and job security. Unlike Purdue, Rochester provided no scholarships, subsidies of room and board, or other enticements for premier athletes and even with the hiring of a Big Ten coach, had no intent to become a major football powerhouse—which Burnham said he preferred. Burnham's predecessor at Rochester, Dudley DeGroot, had left abruptly to coach the Washington Redskins amidst tensions over his big league coaching approach at a small college.

In Burnham's first season, an important victory against Colgate University reassured Rochester fans that the "graying and fatherly pigskin professor from Purdue" could provide a respectable team with as many or more wins as losses. In his seventeen years coaching at Rochester, Burnham exceeded those expectations, even though, because studies came first, practices were short in duration and often sparsely attended. During Burnham's "glory years" for Rochester football, the team was undefeated in 1952 and 1958, with a cumulative record of 82-42-6 in 1944-60. At his retirement, Rochester's athletic director called him "our greatest football coach of all-time." Rochester's winningest coach, Burnham was inducted into Rochester's Athletic Hall of Fame in 1992.

== Personal life and death ==
On June 12, 1920, Burnham wed Grace Alexandra Spurgin in her native Chicago, Illinois. The couple had served together as the only two physical education teachers at South Bend Central High School in the school year 1919-20. They had two girls and a boy who became a star football player at Oberlin College. The family spent holidays and summers at the Burnham homestead in West Newbury. There Burnham participated in American Legion events and recreational sports. In retirement, Burnham divided his time between homes in Rochester and West Newbury. In 1961, West Newbury's annual town meeting voted to name the boys' league baseball field after him.

Burnham died on March 9, 1977, in Rochester, New York. He was 82. His funeral and burial took place in West Newbury.

== Head coaching record ==
=== College ===
Year	Team	Overall	Conference	Standing	Bowl/playoffs	AP^{#}
Purdue Boilermakers (Big Ten Conference) (1942–1943)
1942	Purdue	1–8	1–4	8th		
1943	Purdue	9–0	6–0	T–1st		5
Purdue:		10–8	7–4			
Rochester Yellowjackets (NCAA College Division independent) (1944–1960)
1944	Rochester	5–3				
1945	Rochester	3–4				
1946	Rochester	3–4–1				
1947	Rochester	6–1–1				
1948	Rochester	4–4–1				
1949	Rochester	3–6				
1950	Rochester	1–4–3				
1951	Rochester	7–1				
1952	Rochester	8–0				
1953	Rochester	4–3				
1954	Rochester	5–3				
1955	Rochester	3–5				
1956	Rochester	4–4				
1957	Rochester	5–3				
1958	Rochester	8–0				
1959	Rochester	7–1				
1960	Rochester	6–2				
Rochester:		82–48–6				
Total:		92–56–6				
National championship Conference title Conference division title or championship game berth
^{#}Rankings from final AP Poll.
