= 1944 Iowa State Cyclones football team =

American college football season

1944 Iowa State Cyclones football
- Conference: Big Six Conference
- Record: 6–1–1 (3–1–1 Big 6)
- Head coach: Mike Michalske (3rd season)
- Captain: None
- Home stadium: Clyde Williams Field

1944 Big Six Conference football standings
	Conf.					Overall
Team	W		L		T	W		L		T
Oklahoma $	4	–	0	–	1	6	–	3	–	1
Iowa State	3	–	1	–	1	6	–	1	–	1
Missouri	2	–	1	–	2	3	–	5	–	2
Nebraska	2	–	3	–	0	2	–	6	–	0
Kansas	1	–	4	–	0	3	–	6	–	1
Kansas State	1	–	4	–	0	2	–	5	–	2
$ – Conference champion

The 1944 Iowa State Cyclones football team represented Iowa State College of Agricultural and Mechanic Arts (later renamed Iowa State University) in the Big Six Conference during the 1944 college football season. In their third year under head coach Mike Michalske, the Cyclones compiled a 6–1–1 record (3–1–1 against conference opponents), finished in second place in the conference, and outscored opponents by a combined total of 203 to 39. The team shut out Kansas (25–0) and Kansas State (14–0), ran up 288 rushing yards in a 19–6 victory over Nebraska, and suffered its sole loss to Oklahoma. They played their home games at Clyde Williams Field in Ames, Iowa.

The team's statistical leaders included Meredith Warner with 260 rushing yards and 32 points scored (three touchdowns and 14 extra points), Joe Noble with 162 passing yards, and Dick Howard with 108 receiving yards.

== Schedule ==
Date	Time	Opponent	Site	Result	Attendance	Source
September 30	2:30 pm	Gustavus Adolphus*	Clyde Williams Field; Ames, IA	W 49–0	3,864	
October 7	2:30 pm	Doane*	Clyde Williams Field; Ames, IA	W 59–0	3,461	
October 14	2:30 pm	Kansas	Clyde Williams Field; Ames, IA	W 25–0	6,500	
October 21	2:30 pm	at Missouri	Memorial Stadium; Columbia, MO (rivalry)	T 21–21	5,281	
October 28	2:00 pm	at Kansas State	Memorial Stadium; Manhattan, KS (rivalry)	W 14–0	3,102	
November 4	2:30 pm	Oklahoma^{†}	Clyde Williams Field; Ames, IA	L 7–12	8,474	
November 11	2:00 pm	at Nebraska	Memorial Stadium; Lincoln, NE (rivalry)	W 19–6	7,263	
November 18	2:30 pm	Drake*	Clyde Williams Field; Ames, IA	W 9–0	5,142	
*Non-conference game; ^{†}Homecoming; All times are in Central time
