= 1944 Kansas Jayhawks football team =

American college football season

1944 Kansas Jayhawks football
- Conference: Big Six Conference
- Record: 3–6–1 (1–4 Big 6)
- Head coach: Henry Shenk (2nd season)
- Captain: Warren Riegle
- Home stadium: Memorial Stadium

1944 Big Six Conference football standings
	Conf.					Overall
Team	W		L		T	W		L		T
Oklahoma $	4	–	0	–	1	6	–	3	–	1
Iowa State	3	–	1	–	1	6	–	1	–	1
Missouri	2	–	1	–	2	3	–	5	–	2
Nebraska	2	–	3	–	0	2	–	6	–	0
Kansas	1	–	4	–	0	3	–	6	–	1
Kansas State	1	–	4	–	0	2	–	5	–	2
$ – Conference champion

The 1944 Kansas Jayhawks football team represented the University of Kansas in the Big Six Conference during the 1944 college football season. In their second season under head coach Henry Shenk, the Jayhawks compiled a 3–6–1 record (1–4 against conference opponents), tied for last place in the Big Six, and were outscored by opponents by a combined total of 153 to 128. They played their home games at Memorial Stadium in Lawrence, Kansas.

The team's statistical leaders included Charlie Moffatt with 300 rushing yards, 222 passing yards, and 43 points scored (seven touchdowns and one extra point), and Dwight Sutherland with 148 receiving yards. Warren Riegle was the team captain.

== Schedule ==
Date	Opponent	Site	Result	Attendance	Source
September 15	Washburn*	Haskell Stadium; Lawrence, KS	W 47–0		
September 23	vs. TCU*	Ruppert Stadium; Kansas City, MO	L 0–7	11,516	
September 29	at Denver*	DU Stadium; Denver, CO	T 14–14		
October 7	at Tulsa*	Skelly Field; Tulsa, OK	L 0–27	12,000	
October 14	at Iowa State	Clyde Williams Field; Ames, IA	L 0–25	6,500	
October 21	Nebraska^{†}	Memorial Stadium; Lawrence, KS (rivalry)	W 20–0	7,342	
November 4	Olathe NAS*	Memorial Stadium; Lawrence, KS	W 33–14		
November 11	at Kansas State^{†}	Memorial Stadium; Manhattan, KS (rivalry)	L 14–18	8,000	
November 18	Oklahoma	Memorial Stadium; Lawrence, KS	L 0–20	4,500	
November 23	vs.Missouri	Blues Stadium; Kansas City, MO (rivalry)	L 0–28	19,969	
*Non-conference game; ^{†}Homecoming

== After the season ==
=== NFL draft ===
The following Jayhawks were selected in the 1945 NFL draft following the season.

Round	Pick	Player	Position	NFL club
27	276	Don Fambrough	Back	Chicago Cardinals
27	285	Bill Chestnut	Back	Green Bay Packers
