= 1944 Drake Bulldogs football team =

American college football season

1944 Drake Bulldogs football
- Conference: Missouri Valley Conference
- Record: 7–2 (0–0 MVC)
- Head coach: Vee Green (12th season)
- Home stadium: Drake Stadium

1944 Missouri Valley Conference football standings
	Conf.					Overall
Team	W		L		T	W		L		T
Oklahoma A&M $	1	–	0	–	0	8	–	1	–	0
Tulsa	0	–	1	–	0	8	–	2	–	0
Drake	0	–	0	–	0	7	–	2	–	0
$ – Conference champion

The 1944 Drake Bulldogs football team represented Drake University as a member of the Missouri Valley Conference (MVC) during the 1944 college football season. In its 12th season under head coach Vee Green, the team compiled a 7–2 record, played no MVC games, and outscored opponents by a total of 220 to 57.

The team played its home games at Drake Stadium in Des Moines, Iowa.

== Schedule ==
Date	Opponent	Site	Result	Attendance	Source
September 29	Cornell (IA)	Drake Stadium; Des Moines, IA	W 27–0	2,700	
October 6	Gustavus Adolphus	Drake Stadium; Des Moines, IA	W 25–14	3,700	
October 13	at Washburn	Topeka, KS	W 26–6		
October 20	at Gustavus Adolphus	St. Peter, MN	W 14–2		
October 28	Doane^{†}	Drake Stadium; Des Moines, IA	W 59–0		
November 3	St. Olaf	Drake Stadium; Des Moines, IA	W 26–13	2,000	
November 11	Missouri Valley	Drake Stadium; Des Moines, IA	W 31–0		
November 18	at Iowa State	Clyde Williams Field; Ames, IA	L 0–9	7,000	
November 23	at Wichita	Wichita, KS (Thanksgiving Day game)	L 12–13	5,000	
^{†}Homecoming

== Roster ==
- Allen, center
- Del Cockayne, left halfback
- Cook, right halfback
- Jack Dale, center
- Ralph Gruben, guard, sophomore
- George Kita, fullback
- Dan McHugh, right halfback
- Mugsy Migliorisi, tackle, sophomore
- Salerno, quarterback
- Bob Shestokos, tackle
- Eugene Shipp, quarterback, sophomore
- Art Vogel, guard
- Glenn Wehrmann, end
- Don Welcher, end
- Welk, right halfback
