= 1943 Illinois Fighting Illini football team =

American college football season

1943 Illinois Fighting Illini football
- Conference: Big Ten Conference
- Record: 3–7 (2–4 Big Ten)
- Head coach: Ray Eliot (2nd season)
- MVP: Eddie Bray
- Captain: Game captains
- Home stadium: Memorial Stadium

1943 Big Ten Conference football standings
	Conf.					Overall
Team	W		L		T	W		L		T
No. 5 Purdue +	6	–	0	–	0	9	–	0	–	0
No. 3 Michigan +	6	–	0	–	0	8	–	1	–	0
No. 9 Northwestern	5	–	1	–	0	6	–	2	–	0
Indiana	2	–	3	–	1	4	–	4	–	2
Minnesota	2	–	3	–	0	5	–	4	–	0
Illinois	2	–	4	–	0	3	–	7	–	0
Ohio State	1	–	4	–	0	3	–	6	–	0
Wisconsin	1	–	6	–	0	1	–	9	–	0
Iowa	0	–	4	–	1	1	–	6	–	1
+ – Conference co-champions; Rankings from AP Poll

The 1943 Illinois Fighting Illini football team was an American football team that represented the University of Illinois as a member of the Big Ten Conference during the 1943 Big Ten season. In their second season under head coach Ray Eliot, the Fighting Illini compiled a 3–7 record (2–4 in conference games), finished in sixth place in the Big Ten, and were outscored by a total of 308 to 154. In the final Litkenhous Ratings, Illinois ranked 35th among the nation's college and service teams with a rating of 89.6.

Halfback Eddie Bray was selected as the team's most valuable player. Bray received second-team honors on the 1943 All-Big Ten Conference football team.

The team played its home games at Memorial Stadium in Champaign, Illinois.

== Schedule ==
Date	Opponent	Site	Result	Attendance	Source
September 11	Camp Grant*	Memorial Stadium; Champaign, IL	L 0–23	3,500	
September 18	Iowa Pre-Flight*	Memorial Stadium; Champaign, IL	L 18–32	8,500	
October 2	at Purdue	Ross–Ade Stadium; West Lafayette, IN (rivalry)	L 21–40	15,000	
October 9	at Wisconsin	Camp Randall Stadium; Madison, WI	W 25–7	17,000	
October 16	Pittsburgh*	Memorial Stadium; Champaign, IL	W 33–25	7,144	
October 23	at No. 1 Notre Dame*	Notre Dame Stadium; Notre Dame, IN	L 0–47	24,676	
October 30	No. 7 Michigan	Memorial Stadium; Champaign, IL (rivalry)	L 6–42	15,724	
November 6	at Iowa	StadiumIowa Stadium; Iowa City, IA	W 19–10	11,000	
November 13	at Ohio State	Ohio Stadium; Columbus, OH (Illibuck)	L 26–29	36,331	
November 20	at No. 9 Northwestern	Dyche Stadium; Evanston, IL (rivalry)	L 6–53	25,000	
*Non-conference game; Rankings from AP Poll released prior to the game
