= Adolph J. Lewandowski =

American football and basketball player and coach (1905–1961)

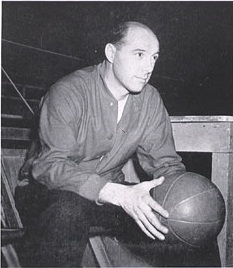
- Lewandowski from 1932 Cornhusker

Biographical details
- Born: May 30, 1905; Chicago, Illinois, U.S.
- Died: November 18, 1961 (aged 56); Lincoln, Nebraska, U.S.

Playing career

Football
- 1928–1929: Nebraska

Basketball
- 1927–1930: Nebraska
- Position: End (football)

Coaching career (HC unless noted)

Football
- 1931–1936: Montana (assistant)
- 1937–1942: Nebraska (assistant)
- 1943–1944: Nebraska

Basketball
- 1932–1937: Montana
- 1940–1945: Nebraska

Baseball
- 1942: Nebraska

Administrative career (AD unless noted)
- 1943–1947: Nebraska
- 1953–1954: Nebraska (acting AD)

Head coaching record
- Overall: 4–12 (football); 81–125 (basketball); 3–11 (baseball)

Adolph J. Lewandowski (May 30, 1905 – November 18, 1961) was an American football and basketball player and coach. He lettered in football, basketball, baseball, and tennis at the University of Nebraska–Lincoln. He began his coaching career in 1931 as an assistant football coach at the University of Montana. Lewandowski was the head basketball coach at Montana from 1932 to 1937 and at Nebraska from 1940 to 1945, amassing a career college basketball record of 81–125. He was also the head baseball coach at Nebraska for one season in 1942, tallying a mark of 3–1, and head coach of the Nebraska Cornhuskers football team from 1943 to 1944, compiling a record of 4–12. He was appointed Nebraska's acting athletic director in 1943 and was named to the position on a permanent basis in 1946. He stepped down as AD in 1947 to focus on his duties as business manager for the athletic department.

He died in 1961 of a heart ailment at the age of 56.

== Head coaching record ==
=== Football ===
Year	Team	Overall	Conference	Standing
Nebraska Cornhuskers (Big Six Conference) (1943–1944)
1943	Nebraska	2–6	2–3	T–4th
1944	Nebraska	2–6	2–3	4th
Nebraska:		4–12	4–6	
Total:		4–12		
