= 1943 Indiana Hoosiers football team =

American college football season

1943 Indiana Hoosiers football
- Conference: Big Ten Conference
- Record: 4–4–2 (2–3–1 Big Ten)
- Head coach: Bo McMillin (10th season)
- MVP: John Tavener
- Captain: John Tavener
- Home stadium: Memorial Stadium

1943 Big Ten Conference football standings
| | Conf. | | | | | Overall |
| Team | W | | L | | T | W | | L | | T |
|---|---|---|---|---|---|---|---|---|---|---|
| No. 5 Purdue + | 6 | – | 0 | – | 0 | 9 | – | 0 | – | 0 |
| No. 3 Michigan + | 6 | – | 0 | – | 0 | 8 | – | 1 | – | 0 |
| No. 9 Northwestern | 5 | – | 1 | – | 0 | 6 | – | 2 | – | 0 |
| Indiana | 2 | – | 3 | – | 1 | 4 | – | 4 | – | 2 |
| Minnesota | 2 | – | 3 | – | 0 | 5 | – | 4 | – | 0 |
| Illinois | 2 | – | 4 | – | 0 | 3 | – | 7 | – | 0 |
| Ohio State | 1 | – | 4 | – | 0 | 3 | – | 6 | – | 0 |
| Wisconsin | 1 | – | 6 | – | 0 | 1 | – | 9 | – | 0 |
| Iowa | 0 | – | 4 | – | 1 | 1 | – | 6 | – | 1 |
+ – Conference co-champions; Rankings from AP Poll

The 1943 Indiana Hoosiers football team represented the Indiana Hoosiers in the 1943 Big Ten Conference football season. The participated as members of the Big Ten Conference. The Hoosiers played their home games at Memorial Stadium in Bloomington, Indiana. The team was coached by Bo McMillin, in his 10th year as head coach of the Hoosiers.

In the final Litkenhous Ratings, Indiana ranked 16th among the nation's college and service teams with a rating of 100.7.

== Schedule ==
| Date | Opponent | Site | Result | Attendance | Source |
|---|---|---|---|---|---|
| September 18 | Miami (OH)* | Memorial Stadium; Bloomington, IN | T 7–7 | | |
| September 25 | at Northwestern | Dyche Stadium; Evanston, IL | L 6–14 | | |
| October 2 | Wabash* | Memorial Stadium; Bloomington, IN | W 52–0 | | |
| October 9 | at Nebraska | Memorial Stadium; Lincoln, NE | W 54–13 | | |
| October 16 | at Iowa | Iowa Stadium; Iowa City, IA | T 7–7 | | |
| October 23 | Wisconsin | Memorial Stadium; Bloomington, IN | W 34–0 | | |
| October 30 | at Ohio State | Ohio Stadium; Columbus, OH | W 20–14 | 25,458 | |
| November 6 | at No. 6 Michigan | Michigan Stadium; Ann Arbor, MI | L 6–23 | 20,000 | |
| November 13 | Great Lakes Navy* | Memorial Stadium; Bloomington, IN | L 7–21 | 7,500 | |
| November 20 | No. 3 Purdue | Memorial Stadium; Bloomington, IN (Old Oaken Bucket) | L 0–7 | 15,000 | |
*Non-conference game; Rankings from AP Poll released prior to the game

== 1944 NFL draftees ==
| Player | Position | Round | Pick | NFL club |
| Billy Hillenbrand | Back | 1 | 6 | New York Giants |
| Jack Tavener | Center | 4 | 28 | Chicago Cardinals |
| Lou Saban | Back | 10 | 88 | Chicago Cardinals |
| Chuck Jacoby | Back | 24 | 244 | Detroit Lions |
| Bob Zimny | Guard | 28 | 287 | Green Bay Packers |
| Russ Deal | Tackle | 31 | 319 | Brooklyn Tigers |
