= 1943 Drake Bulldogs football team =

American college football season

1943 Drake Bulldogs football
- Conference: Missouri Valley Conference
- Record: 4–2 (– MVC)
- Head coach: Vee Green (11th season)
- Home stadium: Drake Stadium

1943 Missouri Valley Conference football standings
	Conf.					Overall
Team	W		L		T	W		L		T
No. 15 Tulsa $	1	–	0	–	0	6	–	1	–	1
Oklahoma A&M	0	–	1	–	0	3	–	4	–	0
$ – Conference champion; Rankings from AP Poll

The 1943 Drake Bulldogs football team represented Drake University as a member of the Missouri Valley Conference (MVC) during the 1943 college football season. In its 11th season under head coach Vee Green, the team compiled a 4–2 record, played no MVC games, and outscored opponents by a total of 110 to 64.

The team played its home games at Drake Stadium in Des Moines, Iowa.

== Schedule ==
Date	Opponent	Site	Result	Attendance	Source
October 1	Central (IA)	Drake Stadium; Des Moines, IA	W 12–6	2,500	
October 8	Western Illinois	Drake Stadium; Des Moines, IA	W 50–0	2,500	
October 15	Missouri Valley	Drake Stadium; Des Moines, IA	W 19–7	1,700	
October 22	William Jewell	Drake Stadium; Des Moines, IA	W 27–19	3,200	
November 4	at Doane (naval trainees)	Crete, NE	L 6–12		
November 13	Iowa State	Clyde Williams Field; Ames, IA	L 0–20	4,750	

== Roster ==
- Brady, tackle
- Del Cockayne, halfback, 140 pounds
- Bob Cook, halfback/punter
- Maury Geist, center
- Leroy Griffith, end
- Ralph Gruben, guard/tackle
- Joe Hayer, fullback
- Peck Henry, halfback
- Ray Johnson, sub back, 140 pounds
- George Kita, guard/center
- Darwin Lewis
- Leo Matthews
- Emmanuel Migliorisi, tackle/placekicker, freshman
- Clark Mollenhoff, center
- Bill Perkins, quarterback
- Keith Perrin, back
- Bill Pointins
- Eugene Shipp, halfback
- Vogel, guard
- Don Weber
- Don Welcher, end
- Winter, tackle
