= 1944 Oklahoma Sooners football team =

American college football season

1944 Oklahoma Sooners football

Big 6 champion
- Conference: Big Six Conference
- Record: 6–3–1 (4–0–1 Big 6)
- Head coach: Dewey Luster (4th season)
- Captains: Bob Mayfield; W. G. Wooten
- Home stadium: Memorial Stadium

1944 Big Six Conference football standings
	Conf.					Overall
Team	W		L		T	W		L		T
Oklahoma $	4	–	0	–	1	6	–	3	–	1
Iowa State	3	–	1	–	1	6	–	1	–	1
Missouri	2	–	1	–	2	3	–	5	–	2
Nebraska	2	–	3	–	0	2	–	6	–	0
Kansas	1	–	4	–	0	3	–	6	–	1
Kansas State	1	–	4	–	0	2	–	5	–	2
$ – Conference champion

The 1944 Oklahoma Sooners football team represented the University of Oklahoma in the 1944 college football season. In their fourth year under head coach Dewey Luster, the Sooners compiled a 6–3–1 record (4–0–1 against conference opponents), won the Big Six Conference championship, and outscored their opponents by a combined total of 227 to 149.

No Sooners received All-America honors in 1944, but four Sooners received all-conference honors: Merle Dinkins (end), John Harley (tackle), Bob Mayfield (center), and W.G. Wooten (end).

== Schedule ==
Date	Opponent	Site	Result	Attendance	Source
September 30	Norman NAS*	Memorial Stadium; Norman, OK	L 14–28	15,000	
October 7	vs. Texas A&M*	Taft Stadium; Oklahoma City, OK	W 21–14	16,000	
October 14	vs. Texas*	Cotton Bowl; Dallas, TX (rivalry)	L 0–20	23,000	
October 21	Kansas State	Memorial Stadium; Norman, OK	W 68–0		
October 28	vs. TCU*	Taft Stadium; Oklahoma City, OK	W 34–19		
November 4	at Iowa State	Clyde Williams Stadium; Ames, IA	W 12–7	8,474	
November 11	Missouri	Memorial Stadium; Norman, OK (rivalry)	T 21–21		
November 18	at Kansas	Memorial Stadium; Lawrence, KS	W 20–0	4,500	
November 25	vs. Oklahoma A&M*	Taft Stadium; Oklahoma City, OK (Bedlam)	L 6–28		
December 2	vs. Nebraska	Taft Stadium; Oklahoma City, OK (rivalry)	W 31–12		
*Non-conference game

== NFL draft ==
The following Sooners were selected in the National Football League draft following the season.

Round	Pick	Player	Position	NFL team
3	21	W. G. Wooten	End	Cleveland Rams
18	180	Lee Kennon	Tackle	Cleveland Rams
25	260	Stan Green	Tackle	Detroit Lions
28	288	Don Fauble	Back	Brooklyn Tigers
