= Alex Agase =

American football player and coach, college athletics administrator

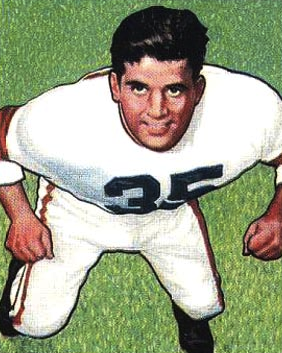
- Agase on a 1950 Bowman football card

No. 36, 35, 62
- Positions: Guard, linebacker

Personal information
- Born: March 27, 1922; Chicago, Illinois, U.S.
- Died: May 3, 2007 (aged 85); Tarpon Springs, Florida, U.S.
- Listed height: 5 ft 10 in (1.78 m)
- Listed weight: 212 lb (96 kg)

Career information
- High school: Evanston Township (Evanston, Illinois)
- College: Illinois (1941-1942, 1946); Purdue (1943)
- NFL draft: 1944: 8th round, 71st overall pick

Career history

Playing
- Los Angeles Dons (1947); Chicago Rockets (1947); Cleveland Browns (1948–1951); Baltimore Colts (1953)

Coaching
- Dallas Texans (1952) Line coach; Iowa State (1954–1955) Line coach; Northwestern (1956–1963) Assistant; Northwestern (1964–1972) Head coach; Purdue (1973–1976) Head coach; Michigan (1982–1987) Assistant

Operations
- Eastern Michigan (1977–1982) Athletic director

Awards and highlights
- NFL champion (1950); 2× AAFC champion (1948, 1949); 2× Consensus All-American (1943, 1946); First-team All-American (1942); Chicago Tribune Silver Football (1946); 2× First-team All-Big Ten (1943, 1946); Second-team All-Big Ten (1942); FWAA Coach of the Year (1970); Walter Camp Foundation All-Century team (1989); University of Illinois All-Century team (1990)

Career NFL/AAFC statistics
- Games played: 70
- Games started: 45
- Interceptions: 8
- Stats at Pro Football Reference
- College Football Hall of Fame

Alexander Arrasi Agase (/ˈæɡəsiː/ AG-ə-see; March 27, 1922 – May 3, 2007) was an American professional football guard and linebacker who was named an All-American three times in college and played on three Cleveland Browns championship teams before becoming head football coach at Northwestern University and Purdue University.

Agase grew up in Illinois and attended the University of Illinois, where he was a standout as a guard starting in 1941. He was named an All-American in 1942. Agase then entered the U.S. Marines during World War II and played a season at Purdue while in training. He was again named an All-American in 1943. After his discharge from the Marines, he came back to Illinois and played a final season in 1946, after which he was named an All-American for a third time. Agase began his professional football career with the Los Angeles Dons of the All-America Football Conference (AAFC) in 1947, but was soon traded to the Chicago Rockets and then the Browns, where he remained until 1952. Cleveland won two AAFC championships and one National Football League championship while Agase was on the team. After retiring from football, Agase worked as an assistant coach for the Dallas Texans and, after a brief return to playing for the Baltimore Colts, Iowa State University. He was hired as an assistant at Northwestern in 1956 under head coach Ara Parseghian.

Agase remained as an assistant until Parseghian left to coach at Notre Dame in 1963 and he was named the new head coach. Agase guided the Northwestern Wildcats to a 32–58–1 win-loss-tie record in nine seasons. He was named coach of the year by the Football Writers Association of America after guiding the team to a 6–4 record in 1970. Agase left to coach at Purdue in 1972, but none of his teams posted a winning record there, and he was fired in 1977. He then spent six years as athletic director at Eastern Michigan University before retiring. Agase died in 2007. He was inducted into the College Football Hall of Fame in 1963.

== Early life and college ==
Agase was born in Chicago to an Assyrian father, Goolasis(Charles) Agase (1883–1959), and an Armenian mother, Eslie Darwitt (1892–1971). Both were born in Persia. His brother Lou was also involved with football.

He attended Evanston Township High School, but only played on the school's varsity football team in his senior year. After graduating, he attended the University of Illinois and played college football there as a right guard in 1941 and 1942. In a 1942 game against the University of Minnesota, Agase scored two touchdowns for the Fighting Illini, becoming only the second guard in college football history to accomplish that feat. The first touchdown came in the second quarter, when Agase stripped the ball from Minnesota's Bill Daley and ran it back 35 yards. The second was a fourth-quarter fumble recovery in the end zone to give Illinois a 20–13 victory. In another game against Great Lakes Naval Training Station, a military team, Agase had 22 tackles. Under coach Ray Eliot, Illinois finished the season with a 6–4 win–loss record. Agase was named an All-American after the season.

Agase entered the U.S. military in 1943 as America's involvement in World War II intensified. He was sent to Purdue University for training in the U.S. Marines and played on the school's football team along with enlistees from other schools. Purdue had won just one Big Ten Conference game the previous year, but the influx of trainees including Agase led to a reversal of fortune in 1943. Coached by Elmer Burnham, the Purdue Boilermakers won all of their games that year and were named Big Ten co-champions. Agase was again named an All-American.

During the following two years, Agase served on active duty in the war. He participated in the battles of Iwo Jima and Okinawa, where he received a Purple Heart after he was wounded in action. He rose to the rank of first lieutenant. Agase returned to Illinois in 1946 and rejoined a Fightining Illini team that posted an 8–2 record and was ranked fifth in the nation in the AP Poll at season's end. Illinois beat the UCLA Bruins in the 1947 Rose Bowl after the season. Agase was named an All-American for a third time, and received the Chicago Tribune Silver Football as the most valuable player in the Big Ten.

== Professional football career ==
Agase had been selected in the eighth round by the Green Bay Packers in the 1944 NFL draft, but military service delayed his professional career. Although Green Bay still held the rights to him when he graduated from college, Agase instead signed in 1947 with the Los Angeles Dons of the new All-America Football Conference (AAFC). Agase, however, played just three games for the Dons before he was traded in September 1947 to the Chicago Rockets, another AAFC team. The Rockets finished the season in last place in the AAFC's western division with a 1–13 record.

The Rockets traded Agase and fellow lineman Chubby Grigg the following year to the Cleveland Browns, who had won the AAFC championship in each of the league's first two years of play. Led by quarterback Otto Graham, fullback Marion Motley and ends Dante Lavelli and Mac Speedie, Cleveland won the championship again in 1948, posting a perfect 14–0 record and beating the Buffalo Bills in the title game. Another championship followed in 1949, but the AAFC then dissolved and the Browns, along with two other teams, were absorbed by the NFL. Helped by a strong offensive line including Agase, center Frank Gatski and tackles Lou Groza and Lou Rymkus, Cleveland won the NFL championship in 1950. The team reached the NFL championship in 1951 but lost to the Los Angeles Rams. Cleveland lost 24–17 despite gaining more yards and more first downs than the Rams. "It was a very disappointing loss", Agase later said. "We weren't quite as sharp as we normally were on offense."

== Coaching career ==
Before the 1952 season, the Browns traded Agase to the Dallas Texans, a newly formed team set to start play that year. He ended his playing career and signed as a line coach with the Texans under head coach Jim Phelan. The Texans finished with a 1–11 record and folded after the season. Agase came out of retirement briefly after the Texans disbanded, joining the Baltimore Colts and playing as a linebacker for the 1953 season. The Colts finished the season with a 3–9 record, placing fifth in the NFL West division.

=== Iowa State and Northwestern ===
Agase was offered a job as an assistant coach for the Colts, but instead joined Iowa State University as its line coach in early 1954 on a $7,000-a-year salary. He and Iowa State head coach Vince DiFrancesca had played football together in high school. After two seasons at Iowa State, he signed as defensive line coach at Northwestern University. He worked under head coach Ara Parseghian, a former Cleveland teammate.

In seven years under Parseghian at Northwestern, Agase rose to become the coach's top assistant. When Parseghian was offered the head coaching job at the University of Notre Dame at the end of 1963, he recommended Agase as his replacement. Agase got the job immediately after Parseghian left.

Agase's first years as coach of the Northwestern Wildcats football team were unsuccessful. The team had losing records each season between 1964 and 1969. In 1970, however, the team finished with a 6–4 record, taking second place in the Big Ten Conference, and Agase was named the national coach of the year by the Football Writers Association of America. The Wildcats followed up with a 7–4 record in 1971, but fell to 2–9 in 1972.

=== Purdue ===
After nine seasons as the Northwestern coach, Agase accepted an offer at the end of 1972 to become head football coach at Purdue, one of the two schools for which he played. Taking the job was "not an easy decision to make", he said at the time, because he was happy at Northwestern. Agase coached at Purdue through the 1976 season. His teams never posted a winning record in his years there, although they did pull two noteworthy upsets of Top Ten teams, defeating #2 Notre Dame in South Bend in 1974 and #1 Michigan in West Lafayette in 1976. He was fired in early 1977 and took a job as athletic director at Eastern Michigan University in Ypsilanti, Michigan. He stayed in that job until 1982, when he unexpectedly resigned citing "personal reasons".

== Later life and death ==
Agase remained active in college football by assisting Bo Schembechler as a volunteer at the University of Michigan until 1987, focusing on special teams. He was named to the Walter Camp Foundation all-century team in 1989 and the University of Illinois all-century team in 1990. Agase was inducted into the College Football Hall of Fame in 1963. While living in Tarpon Springs, Florida, Agase was an active member of George Young United Methodist Church, later renamed East Lake United Methodist Church. He died in 2007 at a hospital near his home in Tarpon Springs, Florida.

== Head coaching record ==
Year	Team	Overall	Conference	Standing	Bowl/playoffs
Northwestern Wildcats (Big Ten Conference) (1964–1972)
1964	Northwestern	3–6	2–5	T–7th	
1965	Northwestern	4–6	3–4	6th	
1966	Northwestern	3–6–1	2–4–1	T–7th	
1967	Northwestern	3–7	2–5	8th	
1968	Northwestern	1–9	1–6	T–8th	
1969	Northwestern	3–7	3–4	T–5th	
1970	Northwestern	6–4	6–1	T–2nd	
1971	Northwestern	7–4	6–3	2nd	
1972	Northwestern	2–9	1–8	10th	
Northwestern:		32–58–1	26–40–1		
Purdue Boilermakers (Big Ten Conference) (1973–1976)
1973	Purdue	5–6	4–4	T–4th	
1974	Purdue	4–6–1	3–5	6th	
1975	Purdue	4–7	4–4	T–3rd	
1976	Purdue	5–6	4–4	T–3rd	
Purdue:		18–25–1	15–17		
Total:		50–83–2			
