= Tony Butkovich =

American football player (1921–1945)

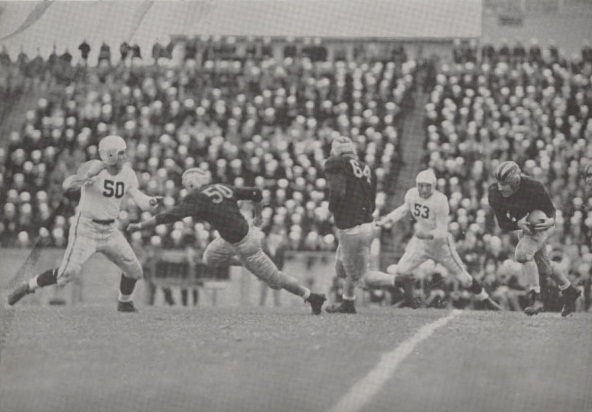
- Butkovich carrying ball behind blocking from Buscemi (50) and Kasap (64) in 1943

No. 25
- Position: Fullback

Personal information
- Born: April 4, 1921; St. David, Illinois, U.S.
- Died: April 18, 1945 (aged 24); Okinawa, Ryukyu Islands, Japanese Empire

Career information
- High school: Lewistown (IL)
- College: Purdue
- NFL draft: 1944: 1st round, 11th overall pick

Career history
- Cleveland Rams (1944)*
- * Offseason or practice squad member only

Awards and highlights
- First-team All-American (1943); First-team All-Big Ten (1943)

Anthony J. Butkovich (April 4, 1921 – April 18, 1945) was a Croatian American football player who was a fullback at the University of Illinois and spent his last year at Purdue. He was drafted by the Cleveland Rams in the first round of the 1944 NFL draft.

Instead of going to the Rams he enlisted in the US Marines and fought in World War II. While serving as a Marine in the 6th Division on Guadalcanal he participated in the Mosquito Bowl.

== Purdue career ==
He led the nation in rushing in 1943; 833 yards, 142 carries (5.9 average), scoring 16 touchdowns (still tied for a Purdue single season record) and led the Boilermakers to a record of 9–0 and a share of the Big Ten Title. The Boilermakers finished the season as the No. 4 team in the nation. In conference play alone, he led the conference in rushing (629 yards over 95 carries) and scoring (13 touchdowns, 78 points); despite only playing 4 conference games as he was transferred by the Marines before the Minnesota game.

He was selected All-American by the Associated Press (AP), International News Service, The Sporting News, United Press International (UPI) and Stars and Stripes; he was also First Team, All-Conference.

=== Statistics ===
Year	Team	Rushing				
Year	Team	Att	Yards	Avg	Yards/G	TD
1941	Illinois	--	--	--	--	--
1942	Illinois	60	174	2.9	34.8	--
1943	Purdue	142	833	5.9	92.6	16
Totals		202	1,007	4.9	71.9	16

== Personal life ==
He was a native of St. David, Illinois and graduated from Lewistown High School in Lewistown, Illinois.

He was killed in action by sniper fire at Okinawa. Coincidentally, fellow #11 overall NFL draft pick Dave Schreiner (from the year prior) was mortally wounded in action by a grenade on June 20, 1945, during the Battle of Okinawa and died the next day. He was 24.
