= List of Northern Iowa Panthers men's basketball head coaches =

The following is a list of Northern Iowa Panthers men's basketball head coaches. There have been 26 head coaches of the Panthers in their 122-season history.

Northern Iowa's current head coach is Kyle Green. He was hired as the Panthers' head coach in April 2026, replacing Ben Jacobson, who left to take the head coaching job at Utah State. Green was previously an assistant at UNI under Greg McDermott from 2001 to 2003, and from 2006 to 2011 and 2012-21 under Jacobson. He was an assistant coach at Iowa State from 2021-2026. He was the head coach in 2011-12 at Division III Wisconsin-Eau Claire.

No.	Tenure	Coach	Years	Record	Pct.
1	1899 (Note: Only partial records are available seasons before 1905.)	S. R. Satterthwaite	1	0–1	.000
2	1900–1901	Enola P. Pierce	1	1–3	.250
3	1901–1902	George B. Affleck	1	1–2	.333
4	1902–1903	Thomas Jones	1	0–2	.000
5	1903–1906	Charles Pell	3	11–12	.478
6	1906–1909	Roy F. Seymour	3	14–15	.483
7	1909–1911	Clayton B. Simmons	2	4–3	.571
8	1911–1913	Pat Pasini	2	8–12	.400
9	1913–1917	Allen P. Berkstresser	4	10–12	.455
10	1917–1918	James Owen Perrine	1	5–5	.500
11	1918–1919	Russell Glaesner	1	2–6	.250
12	1919–1921	Ivan Doseff	2	14–14	.500
13	1921–1924	Leland L. Mendenhall	3	27–7	.794
14	1924–1932; 1933–1937	Arthur D. Dickinson	12	102–66	.607
15	1932–1933	Melvin Fritzel	1	9–4	.692
16	1937–1954 (Note: Northern Iowa did not field a team for the 1943–44 or 1944–45 seasons.)	Hon Nordly	15	166–127	.567
17	1954–1956	Stanley Hall	2	19–22	.463
18	1956–1961	James Witham	5	63–49	.563
19	1961–1967	Norm Stewart	6	97–42	.698
20	1967–1973	Zeke Hogeland	6	70–74	.486
21	1973–1986	James Berry	13	144–210	.407
22	1986–1998	Eldon Miller	12	164–178	.480
23	1998–2001	Sam Weaver	3	30–57	.345
24	2001–2006	Greg McDermott	5	90–63	.588
25	2006–2026	Ben Jacobson	20	397–259	.605
26	2026–present	Kyle Green		–	–
Totals		26 coaches	122 seasons	1,385–1,219	.532
Records updated through end of 2022–23 season Source
