= List of Northern Iowa Panthers football seasons =

This is a list of seasons completed by the Northern Iowa Panthers football team of the National Collegiate Athletic Association (NCAA) Division I Football Championship Subdivision (FCS). The Panthers fielded their first team in 1895 with no head coach designated. The first head coach was Fred Wolff and currently is Todd Stepsis.

There was no football team fielded during the 1906 and 1907 seasons because it was deemed "...too severe to be played at the institution." Northern Iowa did not play football during the 1943 and 1944 seasons because of World War II.

== Seasons ==
Legend

^{†} National Champions
^{‡} Conference Champions
^ Bowl game berth
* Playoff berth

Season	Coach	Conference	Season results				Bowl/Playoff result	Final ranking	
Season	Coach	Conference	Conference finish	Wins	Losses	Ties	Bowl/Playoff result	NCAA/TSN Poll	Coaches Poll
Iowa State Normal School Normals
1895	No coach	Independent	—	1	2	0	—		
1896	No coach	Independent	—	4	3	0	—		
1897	Fred Wolff	Independent	—	5	1	0	—		
1898	Kalita E. Leighton	Independent	—	4	0	1	—		
1899	George Sweetland	Independent	—	1	3	2	—		
1900	Fred A. Williams	Independent	—	3	4	1	—		
1901	George B. Affleck	Independent	—	5	3	2	—		
1902	Charles Pell	Independent	—	1	6	1	—		
1903	Charles Pell	Independent	—	4	3	1	—		
1904	Charles Pell	Independent	—	5	3	1	—		
1905	Charles Pell	Independent	—	5	3	2	—		
1906	Northern Iowa did not play football during the 1906 and 1907 seasons because of the Normal Athletic Board								
1907	Northern Iowa did not play football during the 1906 and 1907 seasons because of the Normal Athletic Board								
1908	Clayton B. Simmons	Independent	—	5	0	0	—		
1909	Clayton B. Simmons	Independent	—	6	0	0	—		
Iowa State Teachers College Tutors/Panthers
1910	James Owen Perrine	Independent	—	1	4	1	—		
1911	Pat Pasini	Independent	—	3	2	1	—		
1912	Pat Pasini	Independent	—	5	2	1	—		
1913	Allen P. Berkstresser	Independent	—	2	3	1	—		
1914	Allen P. Berkstresser	Independent	—	2	5	1	—		
1915	Allen P. Berkstresser	Independent	—	3	3	0	—		
1916	Allen P. Berkstresser	Independent	—	1	7	0	—		
1917	James Owen Perrine	Independent	—	2	3	0	—		
1918	Russell Glaesner	Independent	—	1	3	0	—		
1919	Ivan Doseff	Independent	—	2	4	1	—		
1920	Ivan Doseff	Independent	—	4	2	1	—		
1921	Leland L. Mendenhall	Independent	—	5	1	1	—		
1922	Leland L. Mendenhall	Independent	—	5	2	0	—		
1923	Leland L. Mendenhall	IIAC		3	3	1	—		
1924	Leland L. Mendenhall	IIAC		2	5	0	—		
1925	Paul F. Bender	IIAC		5	1	2	—		
1926	Paul F. Bender	IIAC		5	3	0	—		S
1927^{‡}	Paul F. Bender	IIAC	1st	7	0	1	—		
1928^{‡}	Paul F. Bender	IIAC	?1st	5	1	3	—		
1929	Paul F. Bender	IIAC		3	4	0	—		
1930	Lawrence W. Whitford	IIAC		2	5	1	—		
1931	Lawrence W. Whitford	IIAC		3	5	0	—		
1932	Lawrence W. Whitford	IIAC		5	3	1	—		
1933	John Baker	IIAC		3	6	0	—		
1934	John Baker	IIAC		3	3	2	—		
1935	Thomas Johnson	NCC		4	2	2	—		
1936	Clyde Starbeck	NCC	6th	5	2	2	—		
1937	Clyde Starbeck	NCC	T-3rd	2	4	3	—		
1938	Clyde Starbeck	NCC	7th	3	5	0	—		
1939	Clyde Starbeck	NCC	4th	5	3	1	—		
1940^{‡}	Clyde Starbeck	NCC	1st	8	1	0	—		
1941^{‡}	Clyde Starbeck	NCC	1st	5	3	0	—		
1942^{‡}	Clyde Starbeck	NCC	1st	6	1	0	—		
1943	Clyde Starbeck	Northern Iowa did not play football during the 1943 and 1944 seasons because of World War II							
1944	Clyde Starbeck	Northern Iowa did not play football during the 1943 and 1944 seasons because of World War II							
1945	Clyde Starbeck	NCC	—	3	3	0	—		
1946^{‡}	Clyde Starbeck	NCC	1st	4	1	2	—		
1947^{‡}	Clyde Starbeck	NCC	T-1st♦	5	3	1	—		
1948^{‡}	Clyde Starbeck	NCC	1st	7	3	0	—		
1949^{‡}	Clyde Starbeck	NCC	T-1st♦	5	2	0	—		
1950	Clyde Starbeck	NCC	T-2nd	4	4	0	—		
1951	Clyde Starbeck	NCC	3rd	3	4	0	—		
1952^{‡}	Clyde Starbeck	NCC	1st	6	2	0	—		
1953	Clyde Starbeck	NCC	2nd	6	3	0	—		
1954	Clyde Starbeck	NCC	T-3rd	3	5	0	—		
1955	Clyde Starbeck	NCC	2nd	8	1	0	—		
1956	Clyde Starbeck	NCC	7th	2	5	1	—		
1957	Clyde Starbeck	NCC	3rd	5	3	0	—		
1958	Bill Hammer	NCC	7th	4	5	0	—		
1959	Bill Hammer	NCC	T-4th	6	3	0	—		
1960^{‡}^	Stan Sheriff	NCC	T-1st♦	9	1	0	Lost Mineral Water Bowl vs. Hillsdale College, 17-6		
State College of Iowa Panthers	Stan Sheriff								
1961^{‡}	Stan Sheriff	NCC	T-1st♦	7	2	0	—		
1962^{‡}	Stan Sheriff	NCC	T-1st♦	7	1	1	—		
1963	Stan Sheriff	NCC	T-2nd	5	3	1	—		
1964^{‡}^	Stan Sheriff	NCC	T-1st♦	9	2	0	Won Pecan Bowl vs. Lamar Tech, 19-17		
1965	Stan Sheriff	NCC	3rd	4	5	0	—		
1966	Stan Sheriff	NCC	3rd	4	5	0	—		
1967	Stan Sheriff	NCC	2nd	7	3	0	—		
1968	Stan Sheriff	NCC	T-3rd	5	5	0	—		
Northern Iowa Panthers	Stan Sheriff								
1969	Stan Sheriff	NCC	2nd	5	5	0	—		
1970	Stan Sheriff	NCC	T-6th	2	8	0	—		
1971	Stan Sheriff	NCC	T-2nd	4	5	0	—		
1972	Stan Sheriff	NCC	T-4th	4	6	0	—		
1973	Stan Sheriff	NCC	7th	5	5	0	—		
1974	Stan Sheriff	NCC	T-5th	5	4	1	—		
1975*	Stan Sheriff	NCC	2nd	9	3	0	Quarterfinals Division II playoffs		
1976	Stan Sheriff	NCC	3rd	8	3	0	—		
1977	Stan Sheriff	NCC	T-2nd	6	5	0	—		
1978	Stan Sheriff	AMCU	6th	2	9	0	—		
1979	Stan Sheriff	AMCU	2nd	6	5	0	—		
1980	Stan Sheriff	AMCU	3rd	7	4	0	—		
1981^{‡}	Stan Sheriff	AMCU	T-1st♦	5	6	0	—		
1982^{‡}	Stan Sheriff	AMCU	T-1st♦	4	6	1	—		
1983	Darrell Mudra	AMCU	3rd	6	5	0	—		
1984^{‡}	Darrell Mudra	AMCU	T-1st♦	9	2	0	—	18	
1985^{‡}*	Darrell Mudra	GFC	1st	11	2	0	Semifinals Division I-AA playoffs	4	
1986	Darrell Mudra	GFC	T-2nd	7	3	1	—		
1987^{‡}*	Darrell Mudra	GFC	1st	10	4	0	Semifinals Division I-AA playoffs	4	
1988	Earle Bruce	GFC	4th	5	6	0	—		
1989	Terry Allen	GFC	T-2nd	8	3	0	—	20	
1990^{‡}*	Terry Allen	GFC	T–1st♦	8	4	0	First Round Division I-AA playoffs	11	
1991^{‡}*	Terry Allen	GFC	1st	11	2	0	Quarterfinals Division I-AA playoffs	4	
1992^{‡}*	Terry Allen	GFC	1st	12	2	0	Semifinals Division I-AA playoffs	3	
1993^{‡}*	Terry Allen	GFC	1st	8	4	0	First Round Division I-AA playoffs	13	
1994^{‡}*	Terry Allen	GFC	1st	8	4	0	First Round Division I-AA playoffs	11	
1995^{‡}*	Terry Allen	GFC	T–1st♦	8	5	0	Quarterfinals Division I-AA playoffs	18	
1996^{‡}*	Terry Allen	GFC	1st	12	2	0	Semifinals Division I-AA playoffs	3	
1997	Mike Dunbar	GFC	2nd	7	4	0	—		
1998	Mike Dunbar	GFC	T–3rd	7	4	0	—	25	
1999	Mike Dunbar	GFC	3rd	8	3	0	—	15	
2000	Mike Dunbar	GFC	4th	7	4	0	—	19	
2001^{‡}*	Mark Farley	GFC	1st	11	3	0	Semifinals Division I-AA playoffs	4	
2002	Mark Farley	GFC	T-6th	5	6	0	—		
2003^{‡}*	Mark Farley	GFC	T–1st♦	10	3	0	Quarterfinals Division I-AA playoffs	5	
2004	Mark Farley	GFC	3rd	7	4	0	—	25	
2005^{‡}*	Mark Farley	GFC	T–1st♦	11	4	0	Finals Division I-AA playoffs	2	
2006	Mark Farley	GFC	T–2nd	7	4	0	—	17	
2007^{‡}*	Mark Farley	GFC	1st	12	1	0	Quarterfinals Division I FCS playoffs	4	5
2008^{‡}*	Mark Farley	MVFC	T–1st♦	12	3	0	Semifinals Division I FCS playoffs	4	4
2009	Mark Farley	MVFC	T–3rd	7	4	0	—	18	18
2010^{‡}*	Mark Farley	MVFC	1st	7	5	0	First Round Division I FCS playoffs	19	18
2011^{‡}*	Mark Farley	MVFC	T–1st♦	10	3	0	Quarterfinals Division I FCS playoffs	6	5
2012	Mark Farley	MVFC	T–6th	5	6	0	—	RV	—
2013	Mark Farley	MVFC	T–7th	7	5	0	—	RV	RV
2014*	Mark Farley	MVFC	3rd	9	5	0	Second Round Division I FCS playoffs	10	10
2015*	Mark Farley	MVFC	T–3rd	9	5	0	Quarterfinals Division I FCS playoffs	8	6
2016	Mark Farley	MVFC	T–4th	5	6	0	—	RV	—
2017*	Mark Farley	MVFC	T–2nd	8	5	0	Second Round Division I FCS playoffs	19	19
2018*	Mark Farley	MVFC	T–3rd	7	6	0	Second Round Division I FCS playoffs	23	—
2019*	Mark Farley	MVFC	2nd	10	5	0	Quarterfinal Division I FCS playoffs	5	5
2020	Mark Farley	MVFC	6th	3	4	0	—	25	24
2021*	Mark Farley	MVFC	6th	6	6	0	First Round Division I FCS playoffs	23	25
2022	Mark Farley	MVFC	T–3rd	6	5	0	—	—	—
2023	Mark Farley	MVFC	T–3rd	6	5	0	—	—	—
2024	Mark Farley	MVFC	10th	3	9	0	—	—	—
2025	Todd Stepsis	MVFC	9th	3	9	0	—	—	—
Total				680	441	47	(only includes regular season games)		
Total				1	1	—	(only includes bowl games; 2 appearances)		
Total				26	23	—	(only includes playoff games; 22 appearances)		
Total				707	463	47	(all games)		
♦ Denotes a tie for first place and conference co-champion

== Bowl results ==
Season	Date	Bowl	Opponent	Result	Site	Attendance
1960	November 26	Mineral Water Bowl	Hillsdale College	L 17-6	Excelsior Springs, Missouri	
1964	December 12	Pecan Bowl	Lamar Tech	W 19-17	Abilene, Texas	

== Playoff results ==
Any playoff appearance prior to 1978 was in the NCAA Division II playoffs. All subsequent appearances were in Division I-AA, now known as Football Championship Subdivision. When Division I-AA was formed for football in 1978, the playoffs included just four teams, doubling to eight teams in its fourth season of 1981. In 1982 the I-AA playoffs were expanded to 12 teams, with each of the top four seeds receiving a first-round bye and a home game in the quarterfinals. In its ninth season of 1986, the I-AA playoffs were expanded again, to the present 16-team format, requiring four post-season victories to win the title. In April 2008 the NCAA announced that the playoff field will again expand to include 20 teams beginning in 2010. The playoffs expanded to 24 teams starting in 2013.

Season	Date	Round	UNI Seed	Opponent	Result	Site	Attendance
1975	November 29	First	-	Western Kentucky	L 14-12	Cedar Falls, Iowa	2,500
1985	December 7	Quarterfinals	4	Eastern Washington	W 17-14	Cedar Falls, Iowa	6,220
1985	December 14	Semifinals	4	Georgia Southern	L 40-33	Cedar Falls, Iowa	12,300
1987	November 28	First	3	Youngstown State	W 31-28	Cedar Falls, Iowa	3,887
1987	December 5	Quarterfinals	3	Arkansas State	W 49-28	Cedar Falls, Iowa	6,100
1987	December 12	Semifinals	3	Northeast Louisiana	L 44-41 OT	Monroe, Louisiana	14,443
1990	December 12	First	11	Boise State	L 20-3	Boise, Idaho	11,691
1991	November 30	First	3	Weber State	W 38-21	Cedar Falls, Iowa	8,723
1991	December 7	Quarterfinals	3	Marshall	L 41-13	Huntington, West Virginia	16,889
1992	November 28	First	3	Eastern Washington	W 17-14	Cedar Falls, Iowa	13,149
1992	December 5	Quarterfinals	3	McNeese State	W 29-7	Cedar Falls, Iowa	13,375
1992	December 12	Semifinals	3	Youngstown State	L 19-7	Cedar Falls, Iowa	14,682
1993	November 27	First	13	Boston	L 27-21 2OT	Boston, Massachusetts	6,882
1994	November 28	First	11	Montana	L 23-20	Missoula, Montana	7,958
1995	November 25	First	16	Murray State	W 35-34	Murray, Kentucky	7,633
1995	December 3	Quarterfinals	16	Marshall	L 41-24	Huntington, West Virginia	14,472
1996	November 30	First	3	Eastern Illinois	W 41-24	Cedar Falls, Iowa	10,402
1996	December 7	Quarterfinals	3	William & Mary	W 38-35	Cedar Falls, Iowa	10,796
1996	December 14	Semifinals	3	Marshall	L 31-14	Huntington, West Virginia	14,414
2001	December 1	First	-	Eastern Illinois	W 49-43	Charleston, Illinois	6,824
2001	December 8	Quarterfinals	-	Maine	W 56-28	Cedar Falls, Iowa	9,525
2001	December 15	Semifinals	-	Montana	L 38-0	Missoula, Montana	18,848
2003	November 29	First	-	Montana State	W 35-14	Cedar Falls, Iowa	10,165
2003	December 2	Quarterfinals	-	Delaware	L 37-7	Newark, Delaware	11,881
2005	November 26	First	-	Eastern Washington	W 41-38	Cedar Falls, Iowa	7,746
2005	December 2	Quarterfinals	-	New Hampshire	W 24-21	Durham, New Hampshire	8,448
2005	December 9	Semifinals	-	Texas State	W 40-37 OT	San Marcos, Texas	15,712
2005	December 16	Championship	-	Appalachian State	L 21-16	Chattanooga, Tennessee	20,236
2007	November 24	First	1	New Hampshire	W 38-35	Cedar Falls, Iowa	16,015
2007	December 1	Quarterfinals	1	Delaware	L 39-27	Cedar Falls, Iowa	15,803
2008	November 29	First	3	Maine	W 45-0	Cedar Falls, Iowa	8,477
2008	December 6	Quarterfinals	3	New Hampshire	W 36-34	Cedar Falls, Iowa	9,055
2008	December 13	Semifinals	3	Richmond	L 21-20	Cedar Falls, Iowa	12,062
2010	November 27	First	-	Lehigh	L 14-7	Cedar Falls, Iowa	5,990
2011	December 3	Second	5	Wofford	W 28-21	Cedar Falls, Iowa	6,915
2011	December 9	Quarterfinals	5	Montana	L 48-10	Missoula, Montana	23,049
2014	November 29	First	-	Stephen F. Austin	W 44-10	Cedar Falls, Iowa	10,307
2014	December 6	Second	-	Illinois State	L 41-21	Normal, Illinois	5,575
2015	November 28	First	-	Eastern Illinois	W 53-17	Cedar Falls, Iowa	7,062
2015	December 3	Second	-	Portland State	W 29-17	Portland, Oregon	8,022
2015	December 12	Quarterfinals	-	North Dakota State	L 23-13	Fargo, North Dakota	18,041
