= 1945 Ohio Athletic Conference football season =

American college football season

- Sport: Football
- Teams: 13
- Champion: Oberlin

Football seasons
- 1944 1946

1945 Ohio Athletic Conference football standings
	Conf.					Overall
Team	W		L		T	W		L		T
Oberlin $	3	–	0	–	0	8	–	0	–	0
Capital	5	–	1	–	0	5	–	1	–	0
Baldwin–Wallace	4	–	1	–	0	6	–	4	–	0
Muskingum	4	–	1	–	1	6	–	1	–	1
Ashland	3	–	1	–	0	4	–	1	–	0
Otterbein	3	–	1	–	2	4	–	2	–	2
Wittenberg	3	–	3	–	0	3	–	4	–	0
Denison	2	–	2	–	0	2	–	4	–	0
Case	1	–	3	–	0	2	–	5	–	0
Heidelberg	1	–	4	–	1	1	–	4	–	1
Ohio Northern	0	–	2	–	0	3	–	2	–	0
Wooster	0	–	4	–	0	0	–	6	–	0
Kenyon	0	–	6	–	0	0	–	6	–	0
$ – Conference champion

The 1945 Ohio Athletic Conference football season was the season of college football played by the 13 member schools of the Ohio Athletic Conference (OAC), commonly referred to as the "Ohio Conference", as part of the 1945 college football season.

The Oberlin Yeomen, in their 16th season under head coach Lysle K. Butler, won the OAC championship with a perfect 8–0 record (3–0 against OAC opponents). Oberlin also led the conference in scoring offense with an average of 28.9 points per game.

The Capital Crusaders, led by head coach Bill Bernlohr, finished in second place with a 5–1 record and led the conference in scoring defense, allowing an average of only 4.5 points per game.

The Muskingum Fighting Muskies, under head coach Ed Sherman, compiled a 6–1–1 record, finished in fourth place, and outscored opponents by a total of 199 to 44.

== Conference overview ==
Conf. rank	Team	Head coach	Overall record	Conf. record	Points scored	Points against
1	Oberlin	Lysle K. Butler	8–0	3–0	231	40
2	Capital	Bill Bernlohr	5–1	5–1	158	27
3	Baldwin–Wallace	Ray E. Watts	6–4	4–1	193	181
4	Muskingum	Ed Sherman	6–1–1	4–1–1	199	44
5	Ashland	George Donges	4–1	3–1	92	62
6	Otterbein	Harry W. Ewing	4–2–2	3–1–2	95	94
7	Wittenberg	Howard Maurer	3–4	3–3	119	111
8	Denison	Tom Welbaum	2–4	2–2	45	156
9	Case	Ray A. Ride	2–5	1–3	91	140
10	Heidelberg	Ted Turney	1–4–1	1–4–1	82	153
11	Ohio Northern	Clyde A. Lamb	3–2	0–2	70	52
12	Wooster	John Swigart	0–6	0–4	37	231
13	Kenyon	Pat Pasini	0–6	0–6	13	225

== Teams ==
=== Oberlin ===
1945 Oberlin Yeomen football

OAC champion
- Conference: Ohio Athletic Conference
- Record: 8–0 (3–0 OAC)
- Head coach: Lysle K. Butler (16th season)

The 1945 Oberlin Yeomen football team represented Oberlin College. In their 16th season under head coach Lysle K. Butler, the Yeomen compiled a perfect 8–0 record (3–0 against OAC opponent), won the OAC championship, shut out four of eight opponents, and outscored all opponents by a total of 231 to 40.

Date	Opponent	Site	Result	Attendance	Source
September 1	Wabash*	Oberlin, OH	W 32–7		
September 8	at Case	Cleveland, OH	W 26–0	1,200	
September 15	at Rochester*	River Campus Stadium; Rochester, NY	W 27–12	6,000	
September 22	at Ohio Wesleyan*	Delaware, OH	W 33–0		
September 29	at Denison	Granville, OH	W 34–0		
October 6	Bowling Green*	Oberlin, OH	W 28–0		
October 13	at Baldwin–Wallace	Berea, OH	W 25–7	4,000	
October 20	DePauw*^{†}	Oberlin, OH	W 26–14		
*Non-conference game; ^{†}Homecoming

=== Capital ===
1945 Capital Crusaders football
- Conference: Ohio Athletic Conference
- Record: 5–1 (5–1 OAC)
- Head coach: Bill Bernlohr (12th season)

The 1945 Capital Crusaders football team represented Capital University of Columbus, Ohio. Led by head coach Bill Bernlohr, the Crusaders compiled a 5–1 record (5–1 against OAC opponents), finished in second place in the OAC, shut out four of six opponents, and outscored opponents by a total of 158 to 27.

Date	Opponent	Site	Result	Attendance	Source
October 5	Muskingum	Columbus, OH	W 13–0		
October 13	at Kenyon	Gammbier, OH	W 38–0		
October 20	at Wooster	Wooster, OH	W 28–0		
October 27	Heidelberg	Columbus, OH	W 54–13		
November 3	at Otterbein	Westerville, OH	L 6–14	2,000	
November 10	Wittenberg	Columbus, OH	W 19–0		

=== Baldwin–Wallace ===
1945 Baldwin–Wallace Yellow Jackets football
- Conference: Ohio Athletic Conference
- Record: 6–4 (4–1 OAC)
- Head coach: Ray E. Watts (18th season)

The 1945 Baldwin–Wallace Yellow Jackets football team represented Baldwin–Wallace University of Berea, Ohio. In their 18th season under head coach Ray E. Watts, the Yellow Jackets compiled a 6–4 record (4–1 against OAC opponents), finished in third place in the OAC, and outscored opponents by a total of 193 to 181

Date	Opponent	Site	Result	Attendance	Source
September 8	at Rochester*	Rochester, NY	L 7–13	> 4,000	
September 14	Bowling Green*	Berea, OH	W 14–13		
September 22	Case	Berea, OH	W 21–6		
September 28	Ohio Wesleyan*	Berea, OH	W 33–20		
October 6	at Case	Shaw Stadium; Cleveland, OH	W 21–20		
October 13	Oberlin	Berea, OH	L 7–25	4,000	
October 20	Denison	Berea, OH	W 26–6		
October 26	Wooster	Berea, OH	W 57–6		
November 3	at Cincinnati*	Nippert Stadium; Cincinnati, OH	L 0–39	8,000	
November 10	Ohio*	Berea, OH	L 7–33	5,000	
*Non-conference game

=== Muskingum ===
1945 Muskingum Fighting Muskies football
- Conference: Ohio Athletic Conference
- Record: 6–1–1 (4–1–1 OAC)
- Head coach: Ed Sherman (1st season)

The 1945 Muskingum Fighting Muskies football team represented Muskingum University of New Concord, Ohio. In their first season under head coach Ed Sherman, the Fighting Muskies compiled a 6–1–1 record (4–1–1 against OAC opponents), finished in fourth place in the OAC, and outscored all opponents by a total of 199 to 44.

Date	Opponent	Site	Result	Attendance	Source
September 21	Rio Grande*	New Concord, OH	W 25–0		
September 29	at Otterbein	Westerville, OH	T 0–0		
October 5	at Capital	Columbus, OH	L 0–13		
October 13	at Wittenberg	Wittenberg Stadium; Springfield, OH	W 39–13		
October 19	Heidelberg	New Concord, OH	W 25–12		
October 27	Ashland	McConagha Stadium; New Concord, OH	W 38–6		
November 3	Kenyon^{†}	New Concord, OH	W 65–0	2,500	
November 10	Fletcher General Hospital*	New Concord, OH	W 6–0		
*Non-conference game; ^{†}Homecoming

=== Ashland ===
1945 Ashland Eagles football
- Conference: Ohio Athletic Conference
- Record: 4–1 (3–1 OAC)
- Head coach: George Donges (4th season)

The 1945 Ashland Eagles football team represented Ashland University of Ashland, Ohio. Led by head coach George Donges, the Tigers compiled a 4–1 record (3–1 against OAC opponents), finished in fifth place in the OAC, and outscored opponents by a total of 92 to 62.

Date	Opponent	Site	Result	Source
October 6	Wittenberg	Ashland, OH	W 19–6	
October 27	at Muskingum	McConagha Stadium; New Concord, OH	L 6–38	
November 3	Heidelberg	Ashland, OH	W 19–12	
November 10	Albion*	Ashland, OH	W 13–6	
November 17	at Kenyon	Gambier, OH	W 35–0	
*Non-conference game

=== Otterbein ===
1945 Otterbein Cardinals football
- Conference: Ohio Athletic Conference
- Record: 4–2–2 (3–1–2 OAC)
- Head coach: Harry W. Ewing (8th season)

The 1945 Otterbein Cardinals football team represented Otterbein University. In their eighth season under head coach Harry W. Ewing, the Cardinals compiled a 4–2–2 record (3–1–2 against OAC opponent), finished in sixth place in the OAC, and outscored opponents by a total of 95 to 94.

Date	Opponent	Site	Result	Attendance	Source
September 22	at West Virginia*	Mountaineer Field; Morgantown, WV	L 7–42	6,000	
September 29	Muskingum	Westerville, OH	T 0–0		
October 6	at Denison	Granville, OH	L 14–26		
October 13	at Heidelberg	Tiffin, OH	T 7–7		
October 20	at Kenyon	Gambier, OH	W 14–0		
November 3	Capital	Westerville, OH	W 14–6	2,000	
November 10	Ohio Northern	Westerville, OH	W 27–6		
November 17	at Albion*	Albion, MI	W 12–7		
*Non-conference game

=== Wittenberg ===
1945 Wittenberg Tigers football
- Conference: Ohio Athletic Conference
- Record: 3–4 (3–3 OAC)
- Head coach: Howard Maurer (1st season)
- Captain: Boris Traicoff
- Home stadium: Wittenberg Stadium

The 1945 Wittenberg Tigers football team represented the Wittenberg University of Springfield, Ohio. Led by head coach Howard Maurer, the Tigers compiled a 3–4 record (3–3 against OAC opponents), finished in seventh place in the OAC, and outscored opponents by a total of 119 to 111.

Date	Opponent	Site	Result	Attendance	Source
October 6	Rio Grande*	Wittenberg Stadium; Springfield, OH	L 0–13		
October 13	Muskingum	Wittenberg Stadium; Springfield, OH	L 13–39		
October 6	at Ashland	Ashland, OH	L 6–19		
October 27	Kenyon^{†}	Wittenberg Stadium; Springfield, OH	W 46–0		
November 2	Ohio Northern	Kenton, OH	W 19–9		
November 10	at Capital	Columbus, OH	L 0–19		
November 16	at Heidelberg	Tiffin, OH	W 35–12		
*Non-conference game; ^{†}Homecoming

=== Denison ===
1945 Denison Big Red football
- Conference: Ohio Athletic Conference
- Record: 2–4 (2–2 OAC)
- Head coach: Tom Welbaum (1st season)
- Home stadium: Deeds Field

The 1945 Denison Big Red football team represented Denison University of Granville, Ohio. The Big Red compiled a 2–4 record (2–2 against OAC opponents), finished in eighth place in the OAC, and was outscored by a total of 156 to 45. The team played its home games at Deeds Field in Granville.

Date	Opponent	Site	Result	Attendance	Source
September 15	Ohio Wesleyan*	Deeds Field; Granville, OH	L 0–46		
September 22	Cincinnati*	Nippert Stadium; Cincinnati, OH	L 0–30		
September 29	Oberlin	Deeds Field; Granville, OH	L 0–34		
October 6	Otterbein	Deeds Field; Granville, OH	W 26–14		
October 13	Wooster^{†}	Deeds Field; Granville, OH	W 13–6	2,000	
October 20	at Baldwin-Wallace	Berea, OH	L 6–26		
*Non-conference game; ^{†}Homecoming

=== Case ===
1945 Case Rough Riders football
- Conference: Ohio Athletic Conference
- Record: 2–5 (1–3 OAC)
- Head coach: Ray A. Ride (16th season)

The 1945 Case Rough Riders football team represented Case School of Applied Science (now part of Case Western Reserve University). In their 16th year under head coach Joseph J. Carlin, followed by Ray A. Ride, the Rough Riders compiled a 2–5 record (1–3 against OAC opponents), finished in ninth place in the OAC, and were outscored by a total of 140 to 91.

Date	Opponent	Site	Result	Attendance	Source
September 1	at Rochester*	River Campus Stadium; Rochester, NY	L 6–26	> 3,000	
September 8	Oberlin	Shaw Stadium; East Cleveland, OH	L 0–26		
September 22	at Baldwin–Wallace	Berea, OH	L 6–21		
September 29	at Wooster	Wooster, OH	W 32–6		
October 6	Baldwin–Wallace	Shaw Stadium; East Cleveland, OH	L 20–21		
October 13	at Bowling Green*	University Stadium; Bowling Green, OH	L 7–26		
October 20	at Ohio Wesleyan*	Delaware, OH	W 20–14		
*Non-conference game

=== Heidelberg ===
1945 Heidelberg Student Princes football
- Conference: Ohio Athletic Conference
- Record: 1–4–1 (1–4–1 OAC)
- Head coach: Ted Turney (14th season)

The 1945 Heidelberg Student Princes football team represented the Heidelberg College of Tiffin, Ohio. In their 14th and final season under head coach Ted Turney, the Student Princes compiled a 1–4–1 record (1–4–1 against OAC opponents), finished in tenth place in the OAC, and were outscored by a total of 153 to 82.

Date	Opponent	Site	Result	Source
October 13	Otterbein^{†}	Tiffin, OH	T 7–7	
October 19	at Muskingum	New Concord, OH	L 12–25	
October 27	at Capital	Columbus, OH	L 13–54	
November 3	at Ashland	Ashland, OH	L 12–19	
November 10	Kenyon	Tiffin, OH	W 26–13	
November 16	Wittenberg	Tiffin, OH	L 12–35	
^{†}Homecoming

=== Ohio Northern ===
1945 Ohio Northern Polar Bears football
- Conference: Ohio Athletic Conference
- Record: 3–2 (0–2 OAC)
- Head coach: Clyde A. Lamb (1st season)

The 1945 Ohio Northern Polar Bears football team represented Ohio Northern University of Ada, Ohio. Led by head coach Clyde A. Lamb, the Polar Bears compiled a 3–2 record (0–2 against OAC opponents), finished in 11th place in the OAC, and outscored opponents by a total of 70 to 52.

The team included several veterans of World War II in the starting lineup, including halfback Larry Archer who participated in the first heavy bomber raid on Japan, fullback Gale Weller who flew B-24s, and tackle Jack Zeller who participated in the Normandy invasion and the Ardennes.

Date	Opponent	Site	Result	Source
October 13	at Bluffton*	Harmon Field; Bluffton, OH	W 21–0	
October 20	Bluffton*^{†}	Ada, OH	W 21–0	
October 27	vs. Rio Grande*	Oak Hill, OH	W 13–6	
November 2	Wittenberg	Robinson High School field; Kenton, OH	L 9–19	
November 10	at Otterbein	Waterville, OH	L 6–27	
*Non-conference game; ^{†}Homecoming

=== Wooster ===
1945 Wooster Fighting Scots football
- Conference: Ohio Athletic Conference
- Record: 0–6 (0–4 OAC)
- Head coach: John Swigart (5th season)

The 1945 Wooster Fighting Scots football team represented the College of Wooster of Wooster, Ohio. Led by head coach John Swigart, the Fighting Scots compiled a 0–6 record (0–4 against OAC opponents), finished in 12th place in the OAC, and were outscored opponents by a total of 231 to 37. The team ranked last in scoring defense, giving up 38.5 points per game.

Date	Opponent	Site	Result	Attendance	Source
September 29	Case	Wooster, OH	L 6–32		
October 6	Wabash*	Wooster, OH	L 19–35		
October 13	at Denison	Deeds Field; Granville, OH	L 6–13	2,000	
October 20	Capital	Wooster, OH	L 0–28		
October 26	at Baldwin-Wallace	Berea, OH	L 6–57		
November 10	at Western Michigan*	Waldo Stadium; Kalamazoo, MI	L 0–66		
*Non-conference game

=== Kenyon ===
1945 Kenyon Lords football
- Conference: Ohio Athletic Conference
- Record: 0–6 (0–7 OAC)
- Head coach: Pat Pasini (1st season)

The 1945 Kenyon Lords football team represented Kenyon College of Gambier, Ohio. Led by head coach Pat Pasini, the Lords compiled a 0–6 record (0–6 against OAC opponents), finished in 13th and last place in the OAC, and were outscored by a total of 224 to 13. They had the lowest scoring offense in the conference, averaging 2.2 points per game and failing to score any points in five of their six games.

Date	Opponent	Site	Result	Attendance	Source
October 13	Capital	Gambier, OH	L 0–38		
October 20	Otterbein	Gambier, OH	L 0–14		
October 27	at Wittenberg	Wittenberg Stadium; Springfield, OH	L 0–46		
November 3	at Muskingum	New Concord, OH	L 0–66	2,500	
November 10	at Heidelberg	Tiffin, OH	L 13–26		
November 17	Ashland	Gambier, OH	L 0–35		
