= 1930 Heidelberg Student Princes football team =

American college football season

1930 Heidelberg Student Princes football
- Conference: Ohio Athletic Conference
- Record: 8–0 (2–0 OAC)
- Head coach: Ted Turney (1st season)

1930 Ohio Athletic Conference football standings
	Conf.					Overall
Team	W		L		T	W		L		T
Muskingum $	3	–	0	–	1	6	–	1	–	1
Akron	5	–	1	–	0	7	–	1	–	0
Wooster	4	–	1	–	1	5	–	3	–	1
Xavier	2	–	1	–	0	6	–	4	–	0
Otterbein	3	–	2	–	0	4	–	3	–	1
Case	3	–	3	–	0	5	–	4	–	0
Mount Union	3	–	3	–	0	4	–	5	–	1
Marietta	2	–	2	–	0	3	–	5	–	0
Oberlin	2	–	4	–	0	2	–	6	–	0
Western Reserve	1	–	3	–	0	1	–	7	–	0
Ohio Northern	1	–	4	–	0	3	–	5	–	0
Baldwin–Wallace	1	–	5	–	0	1	–	6	–	0
Kenyon	0	–	4	–	1	1	–	6	–	1
Hiram	0	–	5	–	0	0	–	8	–	0
Heidelberg *	2	–	0	–	0	8	–	0	–	0
Dayton *	2	–	0	–	0	4	–	3	–	2
Capital *	4	–	0	–	1	5	–	1	–	1
$ – Conference champion; * – did not compete for championship

The 1930 Heidelberg Student Princes football team was an American football team that represented Heidelberg College as a member of the Ohio Athletic Conference (OAC) during the 1930 college football season. In their first year under head coach Ted Turney, the Student Princes compiled an 8–0 record, shut out six of eight opponents (including five consecutive shutouts to finish the season), and outscored all opponents by a total of 292 to 20. They concluded the 1930 season as the only college football team in Ohio with a perfect record. They did not qualify for the OAC championship as they played only two games against conference opponents.

The team was led on offense by quarterback Dwight Haley with 83 points scored and fullback Otto Vokaty with 79 points scored.

The 1930 season was the first perfect season in Heidelberg football history. Other perfect seasons followed in 1948, 1955, and 1972.

== Schedule ==
Date	Opponent	Site	Result	Attendance	Source
October 4	at Ohio Wesleyan*	Delaware, OH	W 25–13		
October 11	Ohio State JV*	Tiffin, OH	W 28–0		
October 18	at Wittenberg*	Springfield, OH	W 12–7		
October 24	at Toledo*	Toledo, OH	W 58–0		
November 1	Ohio Northern	Tiffin, OH	W 45–0		
November 8	Adrian*	Tiffin, OH	W 57–0		
November 15	at Akron	Akron, OH	W 26–0	12,006	
November 22	John Carroll*	Tiffin, OH	W 41–0		
*Non-conference game
