= Ray A. Ride =

American football player, coach, and administrator (1904–1990)

Ray Ride
Biographical details
- Born: March 4, 1904
- Died: May 6, 1990 (aged 86); Cleveland, Ohio, U.S.

Playing career
- 1925–1927: Washington & Jefferson
- Position: Tackle

Coaching career (HC unless noted)
- 1929: Washington & Jefferson (assistant)
- 1930–1949: Case

Administrative career (AD unless noted)
- 1932–1954: Case

Head coaching record
- Overall: 80–77–8

Accomplishments and honors

Championships
- 2 OAC (1932, 1941); 1 Big Four Conference (1933)

Ray A. Ride (March 4, 1904 – May 6, 1990) was an American football player, coach, and college athletic administrator. He served as the head football coach at Case Institute of Technology—now known as Case Western Reserve University—from 1930 to 1949, compiling record of 80–77–8. Case honored Ride by changing their fight name from Scientists to Rough Riders in 1940.

== Playing career ==
Ride played tackle at Washington & Jefferson under College Football Hall of Fame coach Andrew Kerr. He was a brother of Alpha Tau Omega.

== Head football coach ==
While starting his coaching career at his alma mater Washington & Jefferson, Ride held the unusual role of sharing the head coaching position with Bill Amos. After the season, Ride resigned citing it being too difficult to operate under dual authority.

In 1930, he accepted the role of head football coach for the Case Tech Scientists. Case Tech's final conference titles would be won under Ride, winning the Ohio Athletic Conference (OAC) twice (1932, 1941) and the Big Four Conference once (1933).

Ride was integral in the creation of the Big Four Conference in 1933, leveraging his relationship with John Carroll's coach Ralph Vince, a fellow Washington & Jefferson alum, establishing the full round-robin of the four schools. Another founder of the conference was head coach Ray Watts of Baldwin Wallace.

Ride was the first guest speaker for the Cleveland Touchdown Club in 1938, invited by founder and president Joe Fogg. He became president of the club in 1959.

== Head coaching record ==
Year	Team	Overall	Conference	Standing	Bowl/playoffs
Case Scientists / Rough Riders (Ohio Athletic Conference) (1930–1947)
1930	Case	5–4	3–3	T–6th	
1931	Case	4–3–1	4–1–1	T–6th	
1932	Case	7–2	6–0	1st	
1933	Case	5–3–1	5–2	T–3rd	
1934	Case	4–3–2	3–2–2	9th	
1935	Case	4–6	3–2	7th	
1936	Case	5–4	4–1	T–4th	
1937	Case	6–2–1	4–1	T–3rd	
1938	Case	2–4–2	2–2–1	T–11th	
1939	Case	5–3	3–1	T–4th	
1940	Case	6–2	3–0	3rd	
1941	Case	7–1	4–0	1st	
1942	Case	4–4	1–2	12th	
1943	Case	3–4	2–2	T–3rd	
1944	Case	2–4–1			
1945	Case	2–5	1–3	9th	
1946	Case	2–7	1–4	T–16th	
1947	Case	1–7	0–5	22nd	
Case Rough Riders (Independent) (1948–1949)
1948	Case	3–5			
1949	Case	3–4			
Case:		80–77–8	49–31–4		
Total:		80–77–8			
National championship Conference title Conference division title or championship game berth
