= 1943 Ohio Athletic Conference football season =

American college football season

- Sport: Football
- Teams: 7
- Champion: Oberlin

Football seasons
- 1942 1944

1943 Ohio Athletic Conference football standings
	Conf.					Overall
Team	W		L		T	W		L		T
Oberlin $	4	–	0	–	0	7	–	0	–	1
Kenyon	1	–	0	–	1	2	–	0	–	2
Baldwin–Wallace	2	–	2	–	0	4	–	4	–	1
Case	2	–	2	–	0	3	–	4	–	0
Otterbein	0	–	1	–	1	2	–	1	–	1
Wooster	0	–	4	–	0	2	–	6	–	0
$ – Conference champion

The 1943 Ohio Athletic Conference football season was the season of college football played by the seven member schools of the Ohio Athletic Conference (OAC), commonly referred to as the "Ohio Conference", as part of the 1943 college football season.

The Oberlin Yeomen, in their 14th season under head coach Lysle K. Butler, won the OAC championship with a 7–0–1 record (4–0 against OAC opponents).

== Teams ==
=== Oberlin ===
1943 Oberlin Yeomen football

OAC champion
- Conference: Ohio Athletic Conference
- Record: 7–0–1 (4–0 OAC)
- Head coach: Lysle K. Butler (14th season)

The 1943 Oberlin Yeomen football team represented Oberlin College. In their 14th season under head coach Lysle K. Butler, the Yeomen compiled a 7–0–1 record (4–0 against OAC opponent), won the OAC championship, and outscored all opponents by a total of 231 to 40.

In the final Litkenhous Ratings, Oberlin ranked 39th among the nation's college and service teams with a rating of 86.2.

Date	Opponent	Site	Result	Attendance	Source
September 25	DePauw*	Oberlin, OH	T 0–0		
October 2	at Case	Shaw Stadium; East Cleveland, OH	W 26–6	4,000	
October 9	Bethany (WV)*	Oberlin, OH	W 26–6		
October 16	at Ohio Wesleyan*	Delaware, OH	W 52–0		
October 23	at Wooster	Wooster, OH	W 46–0		
November 6	at Bethany (WV)*	Bethany, WV	W 20–0		
November 13	Wooster	Oberlin, OH	W 21–0		
November 20	Baldwin–Wallace	Oberlin OH	W 33–7		
*Non-conference game

=== Kenyon ===
1943 Kenyon Lords football
- Conference: Ohio Athletic Conference
- Record: 2–0–2 (1–0–1 OAC)
- Head coach: Rudy Kutler (3rd season)

The 1943 Kenyon Lords football team represented Kenyon College of Gambier, Ohio. In their third and final season under head coach Rudy Kutler, the Lords compiled a 2–0–2 record (1–0–1 against OAC opponents), finished in second place in the OAC, and outscored opponents by a total of 63 to 18. They played home-and-home series against Otterbein and the Kenyon Army Language School, winning and tying a game against each. It was Kenyon's first undefeated season since 1892. The team was made up of only 14 players.

In the final Litkenhous Ratings, Kenyon ranked 87th among the nation's college and service teams with a rating of 70.0.

Date	Opponent	Site	Result	Attendance	Source
October 16	at Kenyon Army Language School	Mount Vernon, OH	T 6–6		
October 23	Otterbein	Gambier, OH	T 6–6		
October 30	at Otterbein	Westerville, OH	W 38–0		
November 13	Kenyon Army Training^{†}	Gambier, OH	W 13–6		
^{†}Homecoming

=== Baldwin–Wallace ===
1943 Baldwin–Wallace Yellow Jackets football
- Conference: Ohio Athletic Conference
- Record: 4–4–1 (2–2 OAC)
- Head coach: Ray E. Watts (16th season)

The 1943 Baldwin–Wallace Yellow Jackets football team represented Baldwin Wallace University of Berea, Ohio. In their 16th season under head coach Ray E. Watts, the Yellow Jackets compiled a 4–4–1 record (2–2 against OAC opponents), tied for third place in the OAC, and were outscored by a total of 38 to 36. Lee Tressel played at the fullback position. He was later inducted into the College Football Hall of Fame.

In the final Litkenhous Ratings, Baldwin–Wallace ranked 113th among the nation's college and service teams with a rating of 62.6.

Date	Opponent	Site	Result	Attendance	Source
September 11	at Rochester*	River Campus Stadium; Rochester, NY	L 6–14	6,000	
September 25	at Case	Shaw Stadium; East Cleveland, OH	W 19–6		
October 2	Wooster	Berea, OH	W 25–7		
October 9	Ohio Wesleyan	Berea, OH	W 13–6		
October 23	Bowling Green	Berea, OH	T 7–7		
October 30	Xavier	Xavier Stadium; Cincinnati, OH	W 53–6	< 1,000	
November 6	Case	Berea, OH	L 0–19		
November 13	Miami (OH)	Berea, OH	L 6–40		
November 20	at Oberlin	Oberlin, OH	L 7–33		
*Non-conference game

=== Case ===
1943 Case Rough Riders football
- Conference: Ohio Athletic Conference
- Record: 3–4 (2–2 OAC)
- Head coach: Ray A. Ride (14th season)

The 1943 Case Rough Riders football team represented Case School of Applied Science (now part of Case Western Reserve University). In their 14th year under head coach Ray A. Ride, the Rough Riders compiled a 3–4 record (2–2 against OAC opponents), tied for third place in the OAC, and were outscored by a total of 116 to 96.

In the final Litkenhous Ratings, Case ranked 116th among the nation's college and service teams with a rating of 61.3.

Date	Opponent	Site	Result	Attendance	Source
September 25	Baldwin–Wallace	Shaw Stadium; East Cleveland, OH	L 6–19		
October 2	Oberlin	Shaw Stadium; East Cleveland, OH	L 6–26	4,000	
October 9	Carnegie Tech*	Shaw Stadium; East Cleveland, OH	W 36–13		
October 16	at Wooster	Wooster, OH	W 7–0		
October 30	at Rochester*	Rochester, NY	L 9–39		
November 6	at Baldwin–Wallace	Berea, OH	T 19–19		
November 13	Bucknell*	Memorial Stadium; Lewisburg, PA	L 13–19	2,000	
*Non-conference game

=== Otterbein ===
1943 Otterbein Cardinals football
- Conference: Ohio Athletic Conference
- Record: 2–1–1 (0–1–1 OAC)
- Head coach: Harry W. Ewing (6th season)

The 1943 Otterbein Cardinals football team represented Otterbein University. In their sixth season under head coach Harry W. Ewing, the Cardinals compiled a 2–1–1 record (0–1–1 against OAC opponent), finished in fifth place in the OAC, and were outscored by a total of 63 to 49.

In the final Litkenhous Ratings, Otterbein ranked 158th among the nation's college and service teams with a rating of 51.6.

Date	Opponent	Site	Result	Attendance	Source
October 2	Rio Grande*		W 23–6		
October 16	West Virginia Tech*	Westerville, OH	W 18–13		
October 23	Kenyon		T 6–6		
October 30	Kenyon		L 0–38		
*Non-conference game

=== Wooster ===
1943 Wooster Fighting Scots football
- Conference: Ohio Athletic Conference
- Record: 2–6 (0–4 OAC)
- Head coach: John Swigart (3rd season)

The 1943 Wooster Fighting Scots football team represented the College of Wooster of Wooster, Ohio. In their third year under head coach John Swigart, the Fighting Scots compiled a 2–6 record (0–4 against OAC opponents), finished in sixth place in the OAC, and were outscored opponents by a total of 157 to 69.

In the final Litkenhous Ratings, Wooster ranked 140th among the nation's college and service teams with a rating of 54.4.

Date	Opponent	Site	Result	Attendance	Source
September 25	at Ohio Wesleyan*	Delaware, OH	W 22–14		
October 2	at Baldwin–Wallace	Berea, OH	L 7–25		
October 9	vs. Miami (OH)*	University of Dayton Stadium; Dayton, OH	L 6–20		
October 16	Case	Wooster, OH	L 0–7		
October 23	Oberlin	Wooster, OH	L 0–46		
October 30	Patterson Field*	Wooster, OH	W 21–3		
November 6	Ohio Wesleyan*	Wooster, OH	L 13–21		
November 13	at Oberlin	Oberlin, OH	L 0–21		
*Non-conference game

=== Muskingum ===
1943 Muskingum Fighting Muskies football
- Conference: Ohio Athletic Conference
- Record: 1–1 (0–0 OAC)
- Head coach: Al Baisler (2nd season)

The 1943 Muskingum Fighting Muskies football team represented Muskingum University of New Concord, Ohio. In their second season under head coach Al Baisler, the Fighting Muskies compiled a 1–1 record (0–0 against OAC opponents) and outscored all opponents by a total of 45 to 7.

In the final Litkenhous Ratings, Muskingum ranked 118th among the nation's college and service teams with a rating of 60.8.

Date	Opponent	Site	Result	Attendance	Source
October 9	at Rio Grande*	Wellston, OH	L 6–7		
October 16	Rio Grande*	New Concord, OH	W 39–0	Handful	
*Non-conference game
