= 1943 Xavier Musketeers football team =

American college football season

1943 Xavier Musketeers football
- Conference: Independent
- Record: 1–6
- Head coach: Clem Crowe (9th season)
- Home stadium: Xavier Stadium

1943 Midwestern college football independents records
	Conf.			Overall
Team	W	L	T	W		L		T
Michigan State Normal		–		2	–	0	–	0
DePauw		–		5	–	0	–	1
No. 1 Notre Dame		–		9	–	1	–	0
Miami (OH)		–		7	–	2	–	1
Western Michigan		–		4	–	2	–	0
Bowling Green		–		5	–	3	–	1
Marquette		–		3	–	4	–	1
Central Michigan		–		2	–	3	–	0
Ohio Wesleyan		–		4	–	6	–	0
Xavier		–		1	–	6	–	0
Wayne		–		0	–	3	–	0
Rankings from AP Poll

The 1943 Xavier Musketeers football team was an American football team that represented Xavier University as an independent during the 1943 college football season. In their ninth year under head coach Clem Crowe, the Musketeers compiled a 1–6 record.

In the final Litkenhous Ratings, Xavier ranked 215th among the nation's college and service teams with a rating of 30.7.

== Schedule ==
Date	Opponent	Site	Result	Attendance	Source
September 25	Bowling Green	Xavier Stadium; Cincinnati, OH	L 0–40	5,000	
October 2	Miami (OH)	Xavier Stadium; Cincinnati, OH	L 6–60	3,500	
October 9	at Western Michigan	Waldo Stadium; Kalamazoo, MI	L 0–60		
October 23	Purdue "B" team	Xavier Stadium; Cincinnati, OH	L 19–20		
October 30	Baldwin–Wallace	Xavier Stadium; Cincinnati, OH	L 6–53	< 1,000	
November 6	Wabash	Xavier Stadium; Cincinnati, OH	Canceled	N/A	
November 13	Wayne	Xavier Stadium; Cincinnati, OH	W 36–0	1,500	
November 25	Miami (OH)	Xavier Stadium; Cincinnati, OH	L 7–52	3,500	
