= 1930 Akron Zippers football team =

American college football season

1930 Akron Zippers football
- Conference: Ohio Athletic Conference
- Record: 7–1 (5–1 OAC)
- Head coach: Red Blair (4th season)
- Captain: Kenneth Cochrane
- Home stadium: Buchtel Field

1930 Ohio Athletic Conference football standings
	Conf.					Overall
Team	W		L		T	W		L		T
Muskingum $	3	–	0	–	1	6	–	1	–	1
Akron	5	–	1	–	0	7	–	1	–	0
Wooster	4	–	1	–	1	5	–	3	–	1
Xavier	2	–	1	–	0	6	–	4	–	0
Otterbein	3	–	2	–	0	4	–	3	–	1
Case	3	–	3	–	0	5	–	4	–	0
Mount Union	3	–	3	–	0	4	–	5	–	1
Marietta	2	–	2	–	0	3	–	5	–	0
Oberlin	2	–	4	–	0	2	–	6	–	0
Western Reserve	1	–	3	–	0	1	–	7	–	0
Ohio Northern	1	–	4	–	0	3	–	5	–	0
Baldwin–Wallace	1	–	5	–	0	1	–	6	–	0
Kenyon	0	–	4	–	1	1	–	6	–	1
Hiram	0	–	5	–	0	0	–	8	–	0
Heidelberg *	2	–	0	–	0	8	–	0	–	0
Dayton *	2	–	0	–	0	4	–	3	–	2
Capital *	4	–	0	–	1	5	–	1	–	1
$ – Conference champion; * – did not compete for championship

The 1930 Akron Zippers football team was an American football team that represented the University of Akron in the Ohio Athletic Conference (OAC) during the 1930 college football season. In its fourth season under head coach Red Blair, the team compiled a 7–1 record (5–1 in conference), shut out five of eight opponents, and outscored all opponents by a total of 130 to 38. Halfback Kenneth "Red" Cochrane was the team captain.

== Schedule ==
Date	Opponent	Site	Result	Attendance	Source
September 27	Toledo*	Buchtel Field; Akron, OH	W 41–0		
October 11	Kent State*	Buchtel Field; Akron, OH (rivalry)	W 12–6		
October 18	at Wooster	Wooster, OH	W 13–6		
October 25	Baldwin–Wallace	Buchtel Field; Akron, OH	W 12–0		
November 2	Oberlin	Buchtel Field; Akron, OH	W 7–0		
November 8	Case	Buchtel Field; Akron, OH	W 25–0		
November 15	Heidelberg	Buchtel Field; Akron, OH	L 0–26	12,006	
November 27	Mount Union	Buchtel Field; Akron, OH	W 20–0		
*Non-conference game
