= 1943 DePauw Tigers football team =

American college football season

1943 DePauw Tigers football
- Conference: Independent
- Record: 5–0–1
- Head coach: Ray Neal (14th season)
- Home stadium: Ira B. Blackstock Memorial Stadium

1943 Midwestern college football independents records
| | Conf. | | | Overall |
| Team | W | L | T | W | | L | | T |
|---|---|---|---|---|---|---|---|---|
| Michigan State Normal | | – | | 2 | – | 0 | – | 0 |
| DePauw | | – | | 5 | – | 0 | – | 1 |
| No. 1 Notre Dame | | – | | 9 | – | 1 | – | 0 |
| Miami (OH) | | – | | 7 | – | 2 | – | 1 |
| Western Michigan | | – | | 4 | – | 2 | – | 0 |
| Bowling Green | | – | | 5 | – | 3 | – | 1 |
| Marquette | | – | | 3 | – | 4 | – | 1 |
| Central Michigan | | – | | 2 | – | 3 | – | 0 |
| Ohio Wesleyan | | – | | 4 | – | 6 | – | 0 |
| Xavier | | – | | 1 | – | 6 | – | 0 |
| Wayne | | – | | 0 | – | 3 | – | 0 |
Rankings from AP Poll

The 1943 DePauw Tigers football team was an American football team that represented DePauw University as an independent during the 1943 college football season. In their 14th season under head coach Ray Neal, the Tigers compiled a 5–0–1 record, shut out five of six opponents, and outscored all opponents by a total of 206 to 6. They were ranked at No. 51 among the nation's college and military service football teams in the final 1943 Litkenhous Ratings.

The team played its home games at Ira B. Blackstock Memorial Stadium in Greencastle, Indiana.

== Schedule ==
| Date | Opponent | Site | Result | Attendance | Source |
|---|---|---|---|---|---|
| September 25 | at Oberlin | Oberlin, OH | T 0–0 | | |
| October 2 | Illinois State Normal | Blackstock Memorial Stadium; Greencastle, IN | W 50–0 | | |
| October 9 | at Indiana State | Terre Haute, IN | W 39–6 | | |
| October 16 | Wabash | Blackstock Memorial Stadium; Greencastle, IN (Monon Bell) | W 33–0 | | |
| October 30 | Ohio Wesleyan | Blackstock Memorial Stadium; Greencastle, IN | W 42–0 | | |
| November 6 | Fort Knox | Blackstock Memorial Stadium; Greencastle, IN | W 42–0 | | |

== Impact of Navy transfers ==
DePauw became a Navy training center during World War II, and its football program in 1943 benefited from incoming transfers as part of the V-5 and V-12 Navy College Training Programs. Harold Harrison of the Associated Press wrote that "the Navy started dropping football players on the DePauw campus", and DePauw became "the little Indiana college that has suddenly found itself with a major league football team and a minor league schedule."

=== Bob Steuber ===
The most important Navy trainee to join the DePauw football team in 1943 was halfback Bob Steuber who in 1942 had played for Missouri, received All-America honors, and was the nation's second-leading rusher with 1,098 yards.

Steuber did not play in DePauw's opening game tie with Oberlin. He was the star in the five remaining games, scoring 129 points. He reportedly scored 100 points in his first 135 minutes of playing time at DePauw.

Steuber's individual game performances at DePauw included:

- October 2: 25 points (four touchdowns and an extra point) and 255 yards on 22 carries in 30 minutes of playing time;
- October 9: 29 points (four touchdowns and three extra points) in 30 minutes of playing time;
- October 16: 25 points (four touchdowns and one extra point)
- October 30: 23 points (three touchdowns and five extra points) and 178 yards in 21 carries)
- November 6: 29 points (four touchdowns and five extra points) and 170 yards in 23 attempts in 40 minutes of playing time

=== Other transfers ===
Other significant Navy transfers in 1943 were ends Kenneth Maikkula (from Connecticut) and Ralph Weiger (from Wisconsin), tackle Ralph Zilly (from Northwestern), center Bob Johnson (from the Green Bay Packers), quarterback Robert "Red" Johnson (from Carthage), fullback Bill Biddle (from William and Mary), halfback Vic Schwall (from Northwestern, later of the Chicago Cardinals), and guard George Petty.
