= 1943 Miami Redskins football team =

American college football season

1943 Miami Redskins football
- Conference: Independent
- Record: 7–2–1
- Head coach: Stu Holcomb (2nd season)
- Captain: Bob Russell (Hon.)
- Home stadium: Miami Field

1943 Midwestern college football independents records
	Conf.			Overall
Team	W	L	T	W		L		T
Michigan State Normal		–		2	–	0	–	0
DePauw		–		5	–	0	–	1
No. 1 Notre Dame		–		9	–	1	–	0
Miami (OH)		–		7	–	2	–	1
Western Michigan		–		4	–	2	–	0
Bowling Green		–		5	–	3	–	1
Marquette		–		3	–	4	–	1
Central Michigan		–		2	–	3	–	0
Ohio Wesleyan		–		4	–	6	–	0
Xavier		–		1	–	6	–	0
Wayne		–		0	–	3	–	0
Rankings from AP Poll

The 1943 Miami Redskins football team was an American football team that represented Miami University as an independent during the 1943 college football season. In its second and final season under head coach Stu Holcomb, Miami compiled a 7–2–1 record and outscored all opponents by a combined total of 293 to 91. The team lost to Western Michigan (6–0) and Arkansas A&M (35–0) and played Indiana to a 7–7 tie. Bob Russell was the honorary team captain.

In the final Litkenhous Ratings, Miami ranked 50th among the nation's college and service teams with a rating of 83.2.

== Schedule ==
Date	Opponent	Site	Result	Attendance	Source
September 18	at Indiana	Memorial Stadium; Bloomington, IN	T 7–7		
September 25	Bethany (WV)	Miami Field; Oxford, OH	W 34–12		
October 2	at Xavier	Xavier Stadium; Cincinnati, OH	W 60–6	3,500	
October 9	vs. Wooster	University of Dayton Stadium; Dayton, OH	W 20–6		
October 16	at Western Michigan	Waldo Stadium; Kalamazoo, MI	L 0–6		
October 23	Ohio Wesleyan	Miami Field; Oxford, OH	W 35–0		
October 30	vs. Arkansas A&M	Crump Stadium; Memphis, TN	L 0–35	3,000	
November 6	Bowling Green	Miami Field; Oxford, OH	W 45–6		
November 13	at Baldwin–Wallace	Berea, OH	W 40–6		
November 25	at Xavier	Xavier Stadium; Cincinnati, OH	W 52–7	3,500	
