= 1943 Western Michigan Broncos football team =

American college football season

1943 Western Michigan Broncos football
- Conference: Independent
- Record: 4–2
- Head coach: John Gill (2nd season)
- MVP: August Camarata
- Captain: Bob Mellen
- Home stadium: Waldo Stadium

1943 Midwestern college football independents records
	Conf.			Overall
Team	W	L	T	W		L		T
Michigan State Normal		–		2	–	0	–	0
DePauw		–		5	–	0	–	1
No. 1 Notre Dame		–		9	–	1	–	0
Miami (OH)		–		7	–	2	–	1
Western Michigan		–		4	–	2	–	0
Bowling Green		–		5	–	3	–	1
Marquette		–		3	–	4	–	1
Central Michigan		–		2	–	3	–	0
Ohio Wesleyan		–		4	–	6	–	0
Xavier		–		1	–	6	–	0
Wayne		–		0	–	3	–	0
Rankings from AP Poll

The 1943 Western Michigan Broncos football team represented Michigan College of Education (later renamed Western Michigan University) as an independent during the 1943 college football season. In their second season under head coach John Gill, the Broncos compiled a 4–2 record and outscored their opponents, 151 to 89. The team played its home games at Waldo Stadium in Kalamazoo, Michigan. Halfback Bob Mellen was the team captain. Fullback August Camarata received the team's most outstanding player award. The team won two games by over 50 points across the season.

In the final Litkenhous Ratings, Western Michigan ranked 59th among the nation's college and service teams with a rating of 81.3.

== Schedule ==
Date	Opponent	Site	Result	Attendance	Source
September 18	at Central Michigan	Alumni Field; Mount Pleasant, MI (rivalry)	W 19–0		
September 25	at Michigan	Michigan Stadium; Ann Arbor, MI	L 6–57	14,008	
October 2	Alma	Waldo Stadium; Kalamazoo, MI	W 54–0		
October 9	Xavier	Waldo Stadium; Kalamazoo, MI	W 60–0		
October 16	Miami (OH)	Waldo Stadium; Kalamazoo, MI	W 6–0		
November 6	No. 18 Great Lakes Navy	Waldo Stadium; Kalamazoo, MI	L 6–32	9,500	
Rankings from AP Poll released prior to the game
