= Rudy Kutler =

American football player and coach (1901–1974)

Biographical details
- Born: November 14, 1901; Miskolc, Hungary
- Died: March 20, 1974 (aged 72); Garfield Heights, Ohio, U.S.

Playing career
- 1921–1924: Ohio State
- 1925: Cleveland Bulldogs
- Position: Guard

Coaching career (HC unless noted)
- 1932: Kenyon
- 1941–1943: Kenyon

Administrative career (AD unless noted)
- 1928–1944: Kenyon

Head coaching record
- Overall: 14–7–3

Rudolph John Kutler (November 14, 1901 – March 20, 1974) was an American football player and coach. He played college football at Ohio State University from 1921 to 1924 and professionally in the National Football League (NFL) with the Cleveland Bulldogs in 1925. Kutler served two stints at the head football coach at Kenyon College, in 1932 and from 1941 to 1943, compiling a record of 14–7–3.

== Head coaching record ==
| Year | Team | Overall | Conference | Standing | Bowl/playoffs |
|---|---|---|---|---|---|
Kenyon Lords (Ohio Athletic Conference) (1932)
| 1932 | Kenyon | 2–3–1 | 2–2 | T–11th | |
Kenyon Lords (Ohio Athletic Conference) (1941–1943)
| 1941 | Kenyon | 5–2 | 4–1 | 7th | |
| 1942 | Kenyon | 5–2 | 0–2 | 17th | |
| 1943 | Kenyon | 2–0–2 | 1–0–1 | 2nd | |
| Kenyon: | | 14–7–3 | 7–5–1 | | |
| Total: | | 14–7–3 | | | |
