= 1943 Central Michigan Chippewas football team =

American college football season

1943 Central Michigan Chippewas football
- Conference: Independent
- Record: 2–3
- Head coach: Ron Finch (7th season)
- Home stadium: Alumni Field

1943 Midwestern college football independents records
	Conf.			Overall
Team	W	L	T	W		L		T
Michigan State Normal		–		2	–	0	–	0
DePauw		–		5	–	0	–	1
No. 1 Notre Dame		–		9	–	1	–	0
Miami (OH)		–		7	–	2	–	1
Western Michigan		–		4	–	2	–	0
Bowling Green		–		5	–	3	–	1
Marquette		–		3	–	4	–	1
Central Michigan		–		2	–	3	–	0
Ohio Wesleyan		–		4	–	6	–	0
Xavier		–		1	–	6	–	0
Wayne		–		0	–	3	–	0
Rankings from AP Poll

The 1943 Central Michigan Chippewas football team represented Central Michigan College of Education, later renamed Central Michigan University, as an independent during the 1943 college football season. In their seventh season under head coach Ron Finch, the Chippewas compiled a 2–3 record, were shut out in all three losses, and were outscored by all opponents by a combined total of 69 to 20. The team was held to 20 points on offense in a pair of victories over Alma College (13–6 and 7–0). The three losses were to Western Michigan (0–19), Alma (0–8), and Bowling Green (0–36).

In the final Litkenhous Ratings, Central Michigan ranked 178th among the nation's college and service teams with a rating of 45.6.

== Schedule ==
Date	Opponent	Site	Result	Source
September 11	Alma	Alumni Field; Mount Pleasant, MI	W 13–6	
September 18	Western Michigan	Alumni Field; Mount Pleasant, MI (rivalry)	L 0–19	
September 25	at Alma	Alma, MI	L 0–8	
October 2	at Bowling Green	Bowling Green, OH	L 0–36	
October 9	at Alma	Alma, MI	W 7–0	
