= 1943 Bowling Green Falcons football team =

American college football season

1943 Bowling Green Falcons football
- Conference: Independent
- Record: 5–3–1
- Head coach: Robert Whittaker (3rd season)
- Captain: Wayne Bordner
- Home stadium: University Stadium

1943 Midwestern college football independents records
	Conf.			Overall
Team	W	L	T	W		L		T
Michigan State Normal		–		2	–	0	–	0
DePauw		–		5	–	0	–	1
No. 1 Notre Dame		–		9	–	1	–	0
Miami (OH)		–		7	–	2	–	1
Western Michigan		–		4	–	2	–	0
Bowling Green		–		5	–	3	–	1
Marquette		–		3	–	4	–	1
Central Michigan		–		2	–	3	–	0
Ohio Wesleyan		–		4	–	6	–	0
Xavier		–		1	–	6	–	0
Wayne		–		0	–	3	–	0
Rankings from AP Poll

The 1943 Bowling Green Falcons football team was an American football team that represented Bowling Green State College (later renamed Bowling Green State University) as an independent during the 1943 college football season. In its third season under head coach Robert Whittaker, the team compiled a 5–3–1 record and outscored opponents by a total of 194 to 104. Wayne Bordner was the team captain.

In the final Litkenhous Ratings, Bowling Green ranked 109th among the nation's college and service teams with a rating of 64.0.

The team played its home games at University Stadium in Bowling Green, Ohio.

== Schedule ==
Date	Opponent	Site	Result	Attendance	Source
September 18	Ohio Wesleyan	University Stadium; Bowling Green, OH	W 18–7		
September 25	at Xavier	Xavier Stadium; Cincinnati, OH	W 40–0	5,000	
October 2	Central Michigan	University Stadium; Bowling Green, OH	W 36–0		
October 9	Patterson Field	University Stadium; Bowling Green, OH	W 36–0		
October 16	Bunker Hill NAS	University Stadium; Bowling Green, OH	L 12–13		
October 23	at Baldwin–Wallace	Berea, OH	T 7–7		
October 30	Alma	University Stadium; Bowling Green, OH	W 24–0		
November 6	at Miami (OH)	Miami Field; Oxford, OH	L 6–45		
November 13	at Ohio Wesleyan	Selby Stadium; Delaware, OH	L 20–32		
