= Clyde A. Lamb =

American sports coach and administrator (1899–1969)

Biographical details
- Born: May 13, 1899; Boone, Iowa, U.S.
- Died: April 30, 1969 (aged 69); Lima, Ohio, U.S.

Playing career

Football
- 1919–1922: Coe

Coaching career (HC unless noted)

Football
- 1945: Ohio Northern
- 1947–1954: Ohio Northern

Basketball
- 1945–1946: Ohio Northern
- 1947–1949: Ohio Northern

Administrative career (AD unless noted)
- 1932–1956: Ohio Northern

Head coaching record
- Overall: 38–35–3 (football); 24–21 (football)

Accomplishments and honors

Championships
- Football; 2 Mid-Ohio (1950, 1952)

Clyde A. Lamb (May 13, 1899 – April 30, 1969) was an American football and basketball coach and college athletics administrator. He served as the head football coach at Ohio Northern University in Ada, Ohio in 1945 and from 1947 to 1954, compiling a record of 38–35–3. Lamb was also the head basketball coach at Ohio Northern for part of the 1945–46 season and from 1947 to 1949.

== Head coaching record ==
=== Football ===
Year	Team	Overall	Conference	Standing	Bowl/playoffs
Ohio Northern Polar Bears (Ohio Athletic Conference) (1945)
1945	Ohio Northern	3–2	0–2	T–11th	
Ohio Northern Polar Bears (Ohio Athletic Conference) (1947–1948)
1947	Ohio Northern	2–5–1	2–4	T–13th	
1948	Ohio Northern	5–3–1	2–2	T–7th	
Ohio Northern Polar Bears (Independent) (1949)
1949	Ohio Northern	6–3			
Ohio Northern Polar Bears (Mid-Ohio League) (1950–1954)
1950	Ohio Northern	9–1	5–0	1st	
1951	Ohio Northern	4–5	3–2	3rd	
1952	Ohio Northern	7–2	5–0	1st	
1953	Ohio Northern	1–7–1	1–3	T–4th	
1954	Ohio Northern	1–7	0–4	6th	
Ohio Northern:		38–35–3	18–17		
Total:		38–35–3			
