= Harry W. Ewing =

American football player, athletics coach, and college athletics administrator

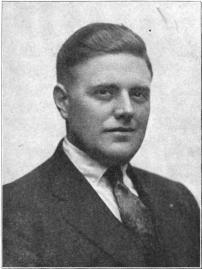
- Ewing, c. 1922

Biographical details
- Born: July 18, 1888; Rosebreak Township, Kansas, U.S.
- Died: March 11, 1962 (aged 73); Westerville, Ohio, U.S.

Playing career

Football
- 1907–1909: Nebraska
- Position: Guard

Coaching career (HC unless noted)

Football
- 1910: Nebraska (assistant)
- 1911: Morningside
- 1912–1917: South Dakota State
- 1918–1920: Ohio Wesleyan
- 1922–1923: Miami (OH)
- 1935–1938: Otterbein
- 1942–1945: Otterbein
- 1951–1954: Otterbein

Basketball
- 1912–1917: South Dakota State
- 1919–1920: Ohio Wesleyan
- 1922–1924: Miami (OH)
- 1942–1952: Otterbein

Baseball
- 1913–1914: South Dakota State

Administrative career (AD unless noted)
- 1922–1924: Miami (OH)
- 1934–1958: Otterbein

Head coaching record
- Overall: 82–82–10 (football); 117–111–1 (basketball)

Harry Walter "Buck" Ewing (July 18, 1888 – March 11, 1962) was an American football player, coach of football, basketball and baseball, and college athletics administrator. He was a 1909 graduate of University of Nebraska where he played football. Ewing served as the head football coach at Morningside College (1911), South Dakota State College (1912–1917), Ohio Wesleyan University (1919–1921), Miami University (1922–1923), and Otterbein College (1935–1938, 1942–1945, 1951–1954), compiling a career college football record of 82–82–10. He was also the head basketball coach at South Dakota State (1912–1913, 1914–1917), Ohio Wesleyan (1919–1920), Miami (1922–1924), and Otterbein (1942–1952), tallying a career college basketball mark of 117–111–1.

== Early life ==
A native of Lincoln, Nebraska, Ewing attended Lincoln High School where he graduated in 1906. He was an all around athlete participating in football, basketball, track, and baseball. In football, he played both tackle and fullback. His football team claimed the high school championship of the United States in 1905. In track, he broke three Lincoln High School records for discus (111 feet) and 12 lb shot put (48 feet 5 inches) and the 12 lb hammer throw (165 feet 8 inches).

== Playing career ==
After playing tackle on the freshman team, Ewing lettered in football at the University of Nebraska under coach William C. "King" Cole in 1907, 1908, and 1909. Weighing 188-pounds, he played guard and was known as a "natural people mover on the field." Ewing helped the 1907 Nebraska Cornhuskers to an 8–2 record and a share of the Missouri Valley Conference title. In 1908, the Cornhuskers finished with 7–2–1 with Ewing starting every game at left guard. In his last season as a Cornhusker the team's record slipped to a 3–3–2 mark.

== Coaching career ==
After finishing his playing days at Nebraska, Ewing joined the Cornhuskers coaching staff. In 1911, he was named director of athletics and coach at Morningside College in Sioux City, Iowa. The following year, he took a coaching position in both football and basketball at South Dakota State College. In 1914, he added the title of athletic director. Ewing served as football coach at South Dakota from 1912 through 1917 with a record of 26–12–2. He also served as basketball coach for the 1912–13 season where his team went 0–2. The next season the college did not field a team but Ewing returned to coach the basketball team for the 1914–15, 1915–16, and 1916–17 seasons. He finished his career as South Dakota State's basketball coach with a record of 14–20–1.

In 1918 Ewing was named head coach of Ohio Wesleyan University where he eventually was promoted to associate professor of physical education and graduate manager. In his three years as football coach at Ohio Wesleyan, he had a combined record of 11–9. He also served as basketball coach for the 1919–20 season where his team went 5–8. In 1922, he took a position as Professor of Physical Education and Director of Intercollegiate Athletics at Miami University. While at Miami he served as head coach of both the football and basketball teams. In the two years as head coach had a combined record of 11–15 in basketball and 7–7–2 in football.

Ewing returned to college coaching in 1934 when he took a position at Otterbein College in Westerville, Ohio. Known as "Mr. Athletics" at Otterbein he served as coach of numerous sports as well as athletic director, trainer, and physical education director from 1934 to 1958. During his career as a coach at Otterbein, Ewing compiled a 32–51–6 record in football and an 87–68 record in basketball. He was honored several ways by Otterbein for his impact on athletics. The track in the Rike Center is named in his memory and he was named to the Otterbein College Athletic Hall of Fame in 2009.

== Head coaching record ==
=== Football ===
Year	Team	Overall	Conference	Standing	Bowl/playoffs
Morningside Maroons (Independent) (1911)
1911	Morningside	6–3			
Morningside:		6–3			
South Dakota State (Independent) (1912–1917)
1912	South Dakota State	2–3–1			
1913	South Dakota State	5–3			
1914	South Dakota State	5–2			
1915	South Dakota State	5–1–1			
1916	South Dakota State	4–2			
1917	South Dakota State	5–1			
South Dakota State:		26–12–2			
Ohio Wesleyan (Ohio Athletic Conference) (1918–1920)
1918	Ohio Wesleyan	3–2	2–2	T–7th	
1919	Ohio Wesleyan	4–4	3–3	T–8th	
1920	Ohio Wesleyan	4–3	3–3	T–9th	
Ohio Wesleyan:		11–9	8–8		
Miami Redskins (Ohio Athletic Conference) (1922–1923)
1922	Miami	4–3–1	4–3	T–9th	
1923	Miami	3–4–1	1–4–1	16th	
Miami:		7–7–2	5–7–1		
Otterbein Cardinals (Ohio Athletic Conference) (1935–1938)
1935	Otterbein	1–6–1	1–6–1	T–18th	
1936	Otterbein	1–7	0–7	21st	
1937	Otterbein	2–6	1–5	18th	
1938	Otterbein	1–6	1–5	18th	
Otterbein Cardinals (Ohio Athletic Conference) (1942–1945)
1942	Otterbein	5–3	4–2	T–5th	
1943	Otterbein	2–1–1	0–1–1	5th	
1944	Otterbein	5–1	NA	NA	
1945	Otterbein	4–2–2	3–1–2	T–5th	
Otterbein Cardinals (Ohio Athletic Conference) (1951–1954)
1951	Otterbein	2–4–2	2–2–1	T–6th	
1952	Otterbein	2–6	2–5	12th	
1953	Otterbein	5–3	5–2	3rd	
1954	Otterbein	2–6	2–4	10th	
Otterbein:		32–51–6	26–40–5		
Total:		82–82–10			
