= 1943 Michigan State Normal Hurons football team =

American college football season

1943 Michigan State Normal Hurons football
- Conference: Independent
- Record: 2–0
- Head coach: Elton Rynearson (22nd season)
- Captains: William R. Nuse; John G. Baker
- Home stadium: Briggs Field

1943 Midwestern college football independents records
	Conf.			Overall
Team	W	L	T	W		L		T
Michigan State Normal		–		2	–	0	–	0
DePauw		–		5	–	0	–	1
No. 1 Notre Dame		–		9	–	1	–	0
Miami (OH)		–		7	–	2	–	1
Western Michigan		–		4	–	2	–	0
Bowling Green		–		5	–	3	–	1
Marquette		–		3	–	4	–	1
Central Michigan		–		2	–	3	–	0
Ohio Wesleyan		–		4	–	6	–	0
Xavier		–		1	–	6	–	0
Wayne		–		0	–	3	–	0
Rankings from AP Poll

The 1943 Michigan State Normal Hurons football team was an American football team that represented Michigan State Normal College (later renamed Eastern Michigan University) as an independent during the 1943 college football season. In their 22nd season under head coach Elton Rynearson, the Hurons compiled an undefeated record of 2–0, playing two games (on October 18 and 28) against Wayne State and winning both games by identical 14–0 scores. William R. Nuse and John G. Baker were the team captains. The team played its home game at Briggs Field on the school's campus in Ypsilanti, Michigan.

In the final Litkenhous Ratings, Michigan State Normal ranked 167th among the nation's college and service teams with a rating of 49.9.

== Schedule ==
Date	Opponent	Site	Result	Attendance	Source
October 16	at Wayne	University of Detroit Stadium; Detroit, MI	W 14–0	200	
October 25	Wayne	Briggs Field; Ypsilanti, MI	W 14–0	1,000	
