= Ashland Eagles football =

- First season: 1920; 106 years ago
- Head coach: Doug Geiser; 3rd season, 27–9 (.750)
- Location: Ashland, Ohio
- Stadium: Jack Miller Stadium
- NCAA division: Division II
- Conference: G-MAC
- Colors: Purple and gold

Conference championships
- 1954, 1955, 1960, 1962, 1963, 1964, 1965, 1980, 1982, 1984, 1985, 1986, 1997, 2012, 2015, 2017, 2022, 2024, 2025
- Website: goashlandeagles

The Ashland Eagles football team represents Ashland University in NCAA Division II college football. The Eagles began playing football in 1920 and compete as members of the Great Midwest Athletic Conference (G-MAC).

== Conference history ==
- 1920–1930: Independent
- 1931–1947: Ohio Athletic Conference
- 1948–1965: Mid-Ohio Conference
- 1966–1977: Independent
- 1978–1989: Heartland Collegiate Conference
- 1990–1998: Midwest Intercollegiate Football Conference
- 1999–2020: Great Lakes Intercollegiate Athletic Conference
- 2021–present: Great Midwest Athletic Conference

== Head coaching history ==
- 1920-1920: Walter Leckrone
- 1921-1922: Arthur Murray
- 1923-1925: William Meredith
- 1926-1926: Walter Pfeiffer
- 1926-1926: Bob Rankin
- 1927-1933: Fred Schmuck
- 1934-1934: Ray Novotny
- 1935-1937: George Donges
- 1938-1941: Frank Lonero
- 1942-1942: Unknown
- 1945-1953: George Donges
- 1954-1957: Robert Brownson
- 1958-1958: Bruce Schmidt
- 1959-1993: Fred Martinelli
- 1994-2003: Gary Keller
- 2004-2022: Lee Owens
- 2023-: Doug Geiser

== Seasons ==
Year	Coach	Overall	Conference	Standing	Bowl/playoffs	Coaches^{#}	AP^{°}
Walter Lekrone (Independent) (1920)
1920	Walter Leckrone	2-3-0					
Arthur Murray (Independent) (1921–1922)
1921	Arthur Murray	4-2-0					
1922	Arthur Murray	5-1-1					
William Meredith (Independent) (1923–1925)
1923	William Meredith	4-5-1					
1924	William Meredith	4-4-1					
1925	William Meredith	0-8-0					
Walter Pfeiffer/Bob Rankin (Independent) (1926)
1926	Walter Pfeiffer/Bob Rankin	6-2-0					
Fred Schmuck (Independent/Ohio Athletic Conference) (1927–1933)
1927	Fred Schmuck	4-3-0					
1928	Fred Schmuck	6-2-0					
1929	Fred Schmuck	7-1-0					
1930	Fred Schmuck	4-2-3					
1931	Fred Schmuck	2-6-0					
1932	Fred Schmuck	2-5-1					
1933	Fred Schmuck	3-4-1					
Ray Novotny (Ohio Athletic Conference) (1934)
1934	Ray Novotny	2-6-1					
George Donges (Ohio Athletic Conference) (1935–1937)
1935	George Donges	2-4-1					
1936	George Donges	2-6-0					
1937	George Donges	2-6-0					
Frank Lonero (Ohio Athletic Conference) (1938–1941)
1938	Frank Lonero	0-7-0					
1939	Frank Lonero	2-4-0					
1940	Frank Lonero	1-4-1					
1941	Frank Lonero	0-5-0					
Unknown (Ohio Athletic Conference) (1942)
1942	Unknown	0-1-0					
George Donges (Ohio Athletic Conference/Mid-Ohio Conference) (1945–1953)
1945	George Donges	4-1-0					
1946	George Donges	2-5-1					
1947	George Donges	3-5-0					
1948	George Donges	6-1-2					
1949	George Donges	6-4-0					
1950	George Donges	5-3-1					
1951	George Donges	2-5-1					
1952	George Donges	0-8-0					
1953	George Donges	1-7-0					
Robert Brownson (Mid-Ohio Conference) (1954–1957)
1954	Robert Brownson	7-0-0					
1955	Robert Brownson	7-2-0					
1956	Robert Brownson	3-5-0					
1957	Robert Brownson	4-3-1					
Bruce Schmidt (Mid-Ohio Conference) (1958)
1958	Bruce Schmidt	1-8-0					
Fred Martinelli (Mid-Ohio Conference/Independent/Heartland Collegiate Conference/Midwest Intercollegiate Football Conference) (1959–1993)
1959	Fred Martinelli	4-3-2					
1960	Fred Martinelli	6-3-0					
1961	Fred Martinelli	3-6-0					
1962	Fred Martinelli	4-4-1					
1963	Fred Martinelli	9-1-0					
1964	Fred Martinelli	6-3-0					
1965	Fred Martinelli	7-1-1					
1966	Fred Martinelli	5-3-2					
1967	Fred Martinelli	8-0-1					
1968	Fred Martinelli	8-2-0					
1969	Fred Martinelli	5-3-1					
1970	Fred Martinelli	4-6-0					
1971	Fred Martinelli	6-4-0					
1972	Fred Martinelli	11-0-0					
1973	Fred Martinelli	7-3-0					
1974	Fred Martinelli	5-5-0					
1975	Fred Martinelli	4-6-0					
1976	Fred Martinelli	6-4-0					
1977	Fred Martinelli	6-4-0					
1978	Fred Martinelli	2-8-0					
1979	Fred Martinelli	3-6-0					
1980	Fred Martinelli	6-3-1					
1981	Fred Martinelli	6-4-0					
1982	Fred Martinelli	8-3-0					
1983	Fred Martinelli	5-5-0					
1984	Fred Martinelli	6-3-1					
1985	Fred Martinelli	6-4-0					
1986	Fred Martinelli	9-2-0					
1987	Fred Martinelli	7-2-1					
1988	Fred Martinelli	6-4-0					
1989	Fred Martinelli	6-4-0					
1990	Fred Martinelli	7-3-1					
1991	Fred Martinelli	9-2-0					
1992	Fred Martinelli	8-3-0					
1993	Fred Martinelli	9-2-0					
Gary Keller (Great Lakes Intercollegiate Athletic Conference) (1994–2003)
1994	Gary Keller	6-4-0					
1995	Gary Keller	2-8-0					
1996	Gary Keller	4-7					
1997	Gary Keller	9-2					
1998	Gary Keller	7-3					
1999	Gary Keller	7-3					
2000	Gary Keller	6-5					
2001	Gary Keller	6-5					
2002	Gary Keller	2-9					
2003	Gary Keller	2-9					
Lee Owens (Great Lakes Intercollegiate Athletic Conference/Great Midwest Athletic Conference) (2004–2022)
2004	Lee Owens	5-6					
2005	Lee Owens	9-2					
2006	Lee Owens	4-6					
2007	Lee Owens	8-2					
2008	Lee Owens	9-4					
2009	Lee Owens	6-5					
2010	Lee Owens	8-3					
2011	Lee Owens	6-5					
2012	Lee Owens	11-1					
2013	Lee Owens	5-5					
2014	Lee Owens	8-2					
2015	Lee Owens	10-1					
2016	Lee Owens	9-2					
2017	Lee Owens	11-2					
2018	Lee Owens	6-4					
2019	Lee Owens	7-4					
2021	Lee Owens	5-5					
2022	Lee Owens	10-2					
Doug Geiser (Great Midwest Athletic Conference) (2023–present)
2023	Doug Geiser	9-3					
2024	Doug Geiser	9-4					
2025	Doug Geiser	10-3					
Total:		548-393-29					
National championship Conference title Conference division title or championship game berth
^{†}Indicates Bowl Coalition, Bowl Alliance, BCS, or CFP / New Years' Six bowl.; ^{#}Rankings from final Coaches Poll.
