= Ted Turney =

American football and basketball player and coach (1901–1979)

Biographical details
- Born: April 27, 1901; Magnetic Springs, Ohio, US
- Died: February 3, 1979 (aged 77); San Diego, California, US

Playing career

Football
- 1920–1923: Ohio Wesleyan

Basketball
- 1920–1924: Ohio Wesleyan
- 1924–1926: Barberton Diamond Matches
- 1925–1926: Akron Buckeye Cycles
- 1926–1927: Akron (CBL)
- 1929–1930: Columbus Robert Lees (NPBL)
- Positions: Fullback, kicker (football); Center (basketball)

Coaching career (HC unless noted)

Football
- 1924–1925: Barberton HS (OH)
- 1926–1929: North HS (OH)
- 1930–1945: Heidelberg

Basketball
- 1931–1946: Heidelberg

Administrative career (AD unless noted)
- 1930–1967: Heidelberg

Head coaching record
- Overall: 51–56–8 (college football); 92–152 (college basketball)

Theodore Roosevelt Turney (April 27, 1901 – February 3, 1979) was an American football and basketball player and coach. He served as the head football coach at Heidelberg College in Tiffin, Ohio from 1930 to 1945, compiling a record of 51–56–8. Turney was the head basketball coach at Heidelberg from 1931 to 1946, tallying a mark of 92–152. He also coached track and golf at Heidelberg and retired as the school's athletic director in 1967. Turney died of a heart attack on February 3, 1979, in San Diego, California.

== Head coaching record ==
=== College football ===
Year	Team	Overall	Conference	Standing	Bowl/playoffs
Heidelberg Student Princes (Ohio Athletic Conference) (1930–1945)
1930	Heidelberg	8–0	2–0	NA	
1931	Heidelberg	3–4	2–1	9th	
1932	Heidelberg	6–1–1	6–1	2nd	
1933	Heidelberg	2–5–2	2–3–2	13th	
1934	Heidelberg	3–5	2–4	T–16th	
1935	Heidelberg	3–4–2	3–3–2	T–10th	
1936	Heidelberg	3–4–1	3–3–1	12th	
1937	Heidelberg	4–4–1	4–3–1	7th	
1938	Heidelberg	1–8	1–6	18th	
1939	Heidelberg	2–7	2–5	14th	
1940	Heidelberg	5–4	5–3	5th	
1941	Heidelberg	6–2	5–2	7th	
1942	Heidelberg	4–2	2–3	T–8th	
1943	No team—World War II				
1944	No team—World War II				
1945	Heidelberg	1–4–1	1–4–1	10th	
Heidelberg:		51–56–8	40–41–7		
Total:		51–56–8			
