= 1943 Marquette Hilltoppers football team =

American college football season

1943 Marquette Hilltoppers football
- Conference: Independent
- Record: 3–4–1
- Head coach: Thomas E. Stidham (3rd season)
- Home stadium: Marquette Stadium

1943 Midwestern college football independents records
	Conf.			Overall
Team	W	L	T	W		L		T
Michigan State Normal		–		2	–	0	–	0
DePauw		–		5	–	0	–	1
No. 1 Notre Dame		–		9	–	1	–	0
Miami (OH)		–		7	–	2	–	1
Western Michigan		–		4	–	2	–	0
Bowling Green		–		5	–	3	–	1
Marquette		–		3	–	4	–	1
Central Michigan		–		2	–	3	–	0
Ohio Wesleyan		–		4	–	6	–	0
Xavier		–		1	–	6	–	0
Wayne		–		0	–	3	–	0
Rankings from AP Poll

The 1943 Marquette Hilltoppers football team was an American football team that represented Marquette University as an independent during the 1943 college football season. In its third season under head coach Thomas E. Stidham, the team compiled a 3–4–1 record and was outscored by a total of 153 to 143. The team played its home games at Marquette Stadium in Milwaukee.

In the final Litkenhous Ratings, Marquette ranked 23rd among the nation's college and service teams with a rating of 94.9.

== Schedule ==
Date	Opponent	Site	Result	Attendance	Source
September 18	at Wisconsin	Camp Randall Stadium; Madison, WI	W 33–7	22,000	
September 25	Purdue	Marquette Stadium; Milwaukee, WI	L 0–21	22,000	
October 3	at Camp Grant	Rockford, IL	T 7–7	11,000	
October 9	Lawrence	Marquette Stadium; Milwaukee, WI	W 26–0	8,000	
October 24	Great Lakes Navy	Marquette Stadium; Milwaukee, WI	L 7–41	15,000	
October 30	at Denver	Hilltop Stadium; Denver, CO	W 45–6		
November 7	No. 8 Iowa Pre-Flight	Marquette Stadium; Milwaukee, WI	L 19–46	3,000	
November 20	at Great Lakes Navy	Ross Field; Great Lakes, IL	L 6–25	22,000	
Rankings from AP Poll released prior to the game
