= 1943 Notre Dame Fighting Irish football team =

American college football season

1943 Notre Dame Fighting Irish football

AP Poll national champion
- Conference: Independent

Ranking
- AP: No. 1
- Record: 9–1
- Head coach: Frank Leahy (3rd season)
- Offensive scheme: T formation
- Captain: Pat Filley
- Home stadium: Notre Dame Stadium

1943 Midwestern college football independents records
	Conf.			Overall
Team	W	L	T	W		L		T
Michigan State Normal		–		2	–	0	–	0
DePauw		–		5	–	0	–	1
No. 1 Notre Dame		–		9	–	1	–	0
Miami (OH)		–		7	–	2	–	1
Western Michigan		–		4	–	2	–	0
Bowling Green		–		5	–	3	–	1
Marquette		–		3	–	4	–	1
Central Michigan		–		2	–	3	–	0
Ohio Wesleyan		–		4	–	6	–	0
Xavier		–		1	–	6	–	0
Wayne		–		0	–	3	–	0
Rankings from AP Poll

The 1943 Notre Dame Fighting Irish football team represented the University of Notre Dame as an independent during the 1943 college football season. The Irish, coached by Frank Leahy, ended the season with 9 wins and 1 loss, winning the national championship. The 1943 team became the fourth Irish team to win the national title and the first for Frank Leahy. Led by Notre Dame's first Heisman Trophy winner, Angelo Bertelli, Notre Dame beat seven teams ranked in the top 13 and played seven of its ten games on the road. Despite a season ending loss to Great Lakes, Notre Dame was awarded its first national title by the Associated Press.

== Schedule ==
Date	Opponent	Rank	Site	Result	Attendance	Source
September 25	at Pittsburgh		Pitt Stadium; Pittsburgh, PA (rivalry)	W 41–0	43,437	
October 2	Georgia Tech		Notre Dame Stadium; Notre Dame, IN (rivalry)	W 55–13	26,497–30,000	
October 9	at No. 2 Michigan	No. 1	Michigan Stadium; Ann Arbor, MI (rivalry)	W 35–12	86,408	
October 16	at Wisconsin	No. 1	Camp Randall Stadium; Madison, WI	W 51–0	16,235	
October 23	Illinois	No. 1	Notre Dame Stadium; Notre Dame, IN	W 47–0	24,676	
October 30	vs. No. 3 Navy	No. 1	Cleveland Stadium; Cleveland, OH (rivalry)	W 33–6	77,900	
November 6	vs. No. 3 Army	No. 1	Yankee Stadium; Bronx, NY (rivalry)	W 26–0	75,121	
November 13	at No. 8 Northwestern	No. 1	Dyche Stadium; Evanston, IL (rivalry)	W 25–6	49,124	
November 20	No. 2 Iowa Pre-Flight	No. 1	Notre Dame Stadium; Notre Dame, IN	W 14–13	39,446	
November 27	at Great Lakes Navy	No. 1	Ross Field; Great Lakes, IL	L 14–19	23,000	
Rankings from AP Poll released prior to the game

== Rankings ==
Notre Dame was the wire-to-wire No. 1 in the season's AP poll and won the Dr. Henry L. Williams Trophy.

Ranking movements Legend: ( ) = First-place votes
	Week								
Poll	1	2	3	4	5	6	7	8	Final
AP	1 (53)	1 (86)	1 (98)	1 (97)	1 (97)	1 (91)	1 (87)	1 (97)	1 (86)

== Awards and honors ==
- Angelo Bertelli: Heisman Trophy

=== All-Americans ===
Name	AP	UP	INS	COL	AA	SN	L
Angelo Bertelli, QB	2	1	1	1	1	1	1
Creighton Miller, HB	1	1	1	1	1		
John Yonakor, E		1	1		1	1	
† Jim White, T	1	1	1	1	1	1	2
Pat Filley, G	2	1				1	
Herb Coleman, C		2					
† denotes consensus selection
