= Lysle K. Butler =

American football and basketball coach, athletics administrator (1903–1973)

Biographical details
- Born: 1903
- Died: July 6, 1973; Oberlin, Ohio, U.S.

Playing career

Football
- c. 1924: Oberlin

Basketball
- c. 1925: Oberlin

Tennis
- c. 1925: Oberlin

Coaching career (HC unless noted)

Football
- 1926–1927: Ashtabula HS (OH)
- 1928–1929: Franklin (IN)
- 1930–1957: Oberlin

Basketball
- 1930–1937: Oberlin
- 1940–1941: Oberlin
- 1943–1946: Oberlin
- 1952–1953: Oberlin

Track
- 1926–1928: Ashtabula HS (OH)

Administrative career (AD unless noted)
- 1954–1969: Oberlin

Head coaching record
- Overall: 89–127–20 (college football)

Accomplishments and honors

Championships
- Football; 2 OAC (1943, 1945)

Lysle K. Butler (1903 – July 6, 1973) was an American football, basketball, and tennis coach and college athletics administrator. Butler served as the head football coach at Franklin College in Franklin, Indiana from 1928 to 1929. He spent the next 28 seasons coach at Oberlin College in Oberlin, Ohio, where he also served as the head basketball coach in four separate stints.

Butler died on July 6, 1973.

== Head coaching record ==
=== College football ===
Year	Team	Overall	Conference	Standing	Bowl/playoffs
Franklin Baptists/Grizzlies (Indiana Intercollegiate Conference) (1928–1929)
1928	Franklin	1–5–2			
1929	Franklin	5–2–1			
Franklin:		6–7–3			
Oberlin Yeomen (Ohio Athletic Conference) (1930–1957)
1930	Oberlin	2–6	2–4	9th	
1931	Oberlin	3–4–1	2–3	13th	
1932	Oberlin	2–6	1–3	15th	
1933	Oberlin	4–4	2–3	T–13th	
1934	Oberlin	2–5–1	1–3–1	19th	
1935	Oberlin	3–4–1	2–2–1	T–9th	
1936	Oberlin	3–5	1–4	T–18th	
1937	Oberlin	2–3–3	1–3–1	15th	
1938	Oberlin	3–4–1	1–4	T–14th	
1939	Oberlin	3–4–1	0–3	T–18th	
1940	Oberlin	4–3	0–3	T–18th	
1941	Oberlin	0–7	0–4	T–18th	
1942	Oberlin	5–1–1	2–1	T–5th	
1943	Oberlin	7–0–1	4–0	1st	
1944	Oberlin	1–6–1			
1945	Oberlin	8–0	3–0	1st	
1946	Oberlin	4–2–1	1–0	3rd	
1947	Oberlin	3–4–1	1–2	T–13th	
1948	Oberlin	3–5	1–3	12th	
1949	Oberlin	2–6	1–5	11th	
1950	Oberlin	7–1	3–1	T–3rd	
1951	Oberlin	4–4	2–2	T–6th	
1952	Oberlin	3–5	2–3	T–8th	
1953	Oberlin	1–6–1	0–5	T–12th	
1954	Oberlin	2–5–1	2–3	9th	
1955	Oberlin	0–8	0–5	T–12th	
1956	Oberlin	1–6–1	1–4–1	T–12th	
1957	Oberlin	1–6–1	0–6	14th	
Oberlin:		83–120–17	36–79–4		
Total:		89–127–20			
National championship Conference title Conference division title or championship game berth
