= Bill Bernlohr =

American athletic director and athletics coach (1904–1991)

- Bill Bernlohr c. 1927

Biographical details
- Born: September 6, 1904; Butler, Pennsylvania, U.S.
- Died: September 3, 1991 (aged 86); Columbus, Ohio, U.S.
- Education: Capital University (1927); Ohio State University

Playing career

Football
- 1923–1926: Capital

Baseball
- 1923–1926: Capital

Basketball
- 1923–1926: Capital
- Position: Outfielder (baseball)

Coaching career (HC unless noted)

Football
- 1927–1928: Butler HS (PA)
- 1929–1938: Capital
- 1944–1945: Capital

Baseball
- 1927–1928: Butler HS (PA)
- 1929–?: Capital

Basketball
- 1927–1928: Butler HS (PA)
- 1929–1956: Capital

Administrative career (AD unless noted)
- 1929–1971: Capital

Head coaching record
- Overall: 37–37–10 (college football); 257–173 (college basketball)

Accomplishments and honors

Championships
- Basketball; 2 OAC (1942, 1946)

Awards
- Capital Hall of Fame (1978)

William Frederick "Mr. Bill" Bernlohr (September 6, 1904 – September 3, 1991) was an American athletic director and athletics coach. He was the head football coach for Capital University from 1929 to 1938 and 1944 to 1945, the baseball coach starting in 1929, and the basketball coach from 1929 to 1956.

== Early life and playing career ==
Bernlohr was born in Butler, Pennsylvania, on September 6, 1904, to Albert and Margaret Bernlohr. He attended Butler High School and played for the football, baseball, and basketball team. He earned two letters and was the captain of the basketball team during his senior year in 1922. From 1923 to 1926, he attended Capital University and played for the football, baseball, and basketball team. He was an outfielder for the baseball team and was unanimously selected as team captain during his senior year. Throughout his basketball career he scored 671 points and averaged 12.24 points per game. Upon his graduation he was regarded as the greatest athlete in Capital history.

== Coaching career ==
Bernlohr began his coaching career in 1927 with his alma mater, Butler High School. He was the head coach for the football, baseball, and basketball team.

In 1929, Bernlohr returned to his college alma mater, Capital, and took over the head coach positions for the football, baseball, and basketball teams and was named athletic director.

Bernlohr served two stints as the head coach for the football team; from 1929 to 1938 and from 1944 to 1945. He resigned from coaching the football team following the 1938 season to focus solely on his athletic director duties. In twelve seasons as head football coach he led the team to an overall record of 37–37–10. His best season came in 1938 when he led the team to a 6–1–1 record. He resigned again following the 1945 season.

Bernlohr served as the head baseball coach for Capital starting in 1929.

Bernlohr served as the head basketball coach for Capital from 1929 to 1956. He led the team to an overall record of 257–173. He won the Ohio Athletic Conference (OAC) twice during his tenure in 1942 and 1946.

Bernlohr retired from his post as athletic director in 1971.

== Honors and death ==
In 1978, Bernlohr was inducted into the Capital Hall of Fame.

Bernlohr died on September 3, 1991, in Columbus, Ohio.

== Head coaching record ==
=== College football ===
Year	Team	Overall	Conference	Standing	Bowl/playoffs
Capital Fighting Lutherans (Ohio Athletic Conference) (1929–1938)
1929	Capital	0–5–2	0–5	17th	
1930	Capital	5–1–1	4–0–1	N/A (Note: Did not compete for championship)	
1931	Capital	1–5–1	1–4	T–15th	
1932	Capital	1–4–2	1–4–2	14th	
1933	Capital	1–4–2	1–4–2	17th	
1934	Capital	2–5	2–5	T–18th	
1935	Capital	5–2	4–2	4th	
1936	Capital	4–2–1	3–2–1	10th	
1937	Capital	4–4	3–4	11th	
1938	Capital	6–1–1	5–1–1	4th	
Capital Fighting Lutherans (Ohio Athletic Conference) (1944–1945)
1944	Capital	3–3			
1945	Capital	5–1	5–1	2nd	
Capital:		37–37–10			
Total:		37–37–10			
