= Ray E. Watts =

American sports coach (1895–1969)

Biographical details
- Born: September 18, 1895; Powell, Ohio, U.S.
- Died: June 3, 1969 (aged 73); Berea, Ohio, U.S.
- Education: Otterbein College

Coaching career (HC unless noted)

Football
- 1919: Otterbein
- 1926: Cleveland Panthers
- 1928–1948: Baldwin–Wallace

Basketball
- 1918–1920: Otterbein
- 1928–1935: Baldwin–Wallace
- 1940–1950: Baldwin–Wallace
- 1952–1958: Baldwin–Wallace

Baseball
- 1929–1931: Baldwin–Wallace
- 1935–1936: Baldwin–Wallace
- 1944: Baldwin–Wallace

Head coaching record
- Overall: 104–65–14 (college football); 304–230 (college basketball); 15–13–1 (college baseball); 3–2 (AFL)

Accomplishments and honors

Championships
- Football; 2 OAC (1935, 1937)

Raymond Ernest Watts (September 18, 1895 – June 3, 1969) was an American football, basketball and baseball coach. He served as a head coach in three different sports at Baldwin–Wallace College–now known as Baldwin Wallace University—in Berea, Ohio between 1928 and 1948. Watts was the head football coach at Otterbein University in 1919.

== Head coaching record ==
=== College football ===
Year	Team	Overall	Conference	Standing	Bowl/playoffs
Otterbein Cardinals (Independent) (1919)
1919	Otterbein	0–7			
Otterbein:		0–7			
Baldwin–Wallace Yellow Jackets (Ohio Athletic Conference) (1928–1947)
1928	Baldwin–Wallace	0–8	0–8	13th	
1929	Baldwin–Wallace	6–1–1	4–1–1	5th	
1930	Baldwin–Wallace	1–6	1–5	12th	
1931	Baldwin–Wallace	5–0–3	4–0–1	3rd	
1932	Baldwin–Wallace	6–1–1	5–1–1	3rd	
1933	Baldwin–Wallace	5–3–1	4–2–1	T–5th	
1934	Baldwin–Wallace	7–1	5–0	T–3rd	
1935	Baldwin–Wallace	9–1	8–0	1st	
1936	Baldwin–Wallace	7–1	3–0	2nd	
1937	Baldwin–Wallace	6–2	4–0	1st	
1938	Baldwin–Wallace	3–5	2–1	T–6th	
1939	Baldwin–Wallace	6–2	1–2	T–13th	
1940	Baldwin–Wallace	4–4	2–2	T–10th	
1941	Baldwin–Wallace	3–4–1	0–2–1	16th	
1942	Baldwin–Wallace	6–2	2–1	T–5th	
1943	Baldwin–Wallace	4–4–1	2–2	T–3rd	
1944	Baldwin–Wallace	6–1–2			
1945	Baldwin–Wallace	6–4	4–1	T–3rd	
1946	Baldwin–Wallace	4–2–2	4–1	5th	
1947	Baldwin–Wallace	5–4	4–2	T–7th	
Baldwin–Wallace Yellow Jackets (Independent) (1948)
1948	Baldwin–Wallace	5–2–2			
Baldwin–Wallace:		104–58–14	59–31–5		
Total:		104–65–14			
National championship Conference title Conference division title or championship game berth
