= George Donges =

American football coach (1906–1976)

Biographical details
- Born: September 27, 1906; Meyersdale, Pennsylvania, U.S.
- Died: May 28, 1976 (aged 69); Mansfield, Ohio, U.S.
- Education: Ashland College (1930); Pennsylvania State University; Columbia University (1935)

Playing career

Football
- 1926–1929: Ashland

Basketball
- 1929–1930: Ashland
- Positions: Fullback, lineman (football); Guard (basketball)

Coaching career (HC unless noted)

Football
- 1930–1932: Adario HS (OH)
- 1933–1934?: Ashland (backfield)
- 1935–1937: Ashland
- 1938?–1941?: Ashland (freshman)
- 1942–1953: Ashland

Baseball
- 1936–1971: Ashland

Basketball
- 1935–1937: Ashland
- 1943–1946: Ashland
- 1952–1954: Ashland

Track and field
- 1933?–1954?: Ashland

Administrative career (AD unless noted)
- ?: Ashland

Head coaching record
- Overall: 35–56–6 (college football); 30–92 (college basketball); 346–261–3 (college baseball)

George Henry Donges (September 27, 1906 – May 28, 1976) was an American college football coach. He was the head football coach for Ashland College—now known as Ashland University—from 1935 to 1937 and from 1942 to 1953. He also coached the school's basketball, baseball, and track and field teams. He also played football and basketball for Ashland.

Before returning to Ashland, Donges served as the head football coach for Adario High School.

== Head coaching record ==
=== College football ===
Year	Team	Overall	Conference	Standing	Bowl/playoffs
Ashland Eagles (Ohio Athletic Conference) (1935–1937)
1935	Ashland	2–4–1	2–4–1	15th	
1936	Ashland	2–6	2–6	16th	
1937	Ashland	2–6	2–5	16th	
Ashland Eagles (Ohio Athletic Conference) (1942–1947)
1942	Ashland	0–1	0–1	16th	
1943	No team—World War II				
1944	No team—World War II				
1945	Ashland	4–1	3–1	5th	
1946	Ashland	2–5–1	2–3–1	13th	
1947	Ashland	3–5	1–3	T–18th	
Ashland Eagles (Independent) (1948)
1948	Ashland	6–1–2			
Ashland Eagles (Mid-Ohio League) (1949–1953)
1949	Ashland	6–4	3–1	2nd	
1950	Ashland	5–3–1	3–1–1	T–2nd	
1951	Ashland	2–5–1	2–3	T–4th	
1952	Ashland	0–8	0–5	6th	
1953	Ashland	1–7	1–3	T–4th	
Ashland:		35–56–6	21–36–3		
Total:		35–56–6			
