= 1930 Xavier Musketeers football team =

American college football season

1930 Xavier Musketeers football
- Conference: Ohio Athletic Conference
- Record: 6–4 (2–1 OAC)
- Head coach: Joseph A. Meyer (11th season)
- Home stadium: St. Xavier Stadium

1930 Ohio Athletic Conference football standings
	Conf.					Overall
Team	W		L		T	W		L		T
Muskingum $	3	–	0	–	1	6	–	1	–	1
Akron	5	–	1	–	0	7	–	1	–	0
Wooster	4	–	1	–	1	5	–	3	–	1
Xavier	2	–	1	–	0	6	–	4	–	0
Otterbein	3	–	2	–	0	4	–	3	–	1
Case	3	–	3	–	0	5	–	4	–	0
Mount Union	3	–	3	–	0	4	–	5	–	1
Marietta	2	–	2	–	0	3	–	5	–	0
Oberlin	2	–	4	–	0	2	–	6	–	0
Western Reserve	1	–	3	–	0	1	–	7	–	0
Ohio Northern	1	–	4	–	0	3	–	5	–	0
Baldwin–Wallace	1	–	5	–	0	1	–	6	–	0
Kenyon	0	–	4	–	1	1	–	6	–	1
Hiram	0	–	5	–	0	0	–	8	–	0
Heidelberg *	2	–	0	–	0	8	–	0	–	0
Dayton *	2	–	0	–	0	4	–	3	–	2
Capital *	4	–	0	–	1	5	–	1	–	1
$ – Conference champion; * – did not compete for championship

The 1930 Xavier Musketeers football team was an American football team that represented Xavier University as a member of the Ohio Athletic Conference (OAC) during the 1930 college football season. In its eleventh season under head coach Joseph A. Meyer, the team compiled a 6–4 record (2–1 against OAC opponents) and outscored all opponents by a total of 170 to 86.

== Schedule ==
Date	Opponent	Site	Result	Attendance	Source
September 26	Transylvania*	Corcoran Field; Cincinnati, OH	W 14–0	10,000	
October 4	at Denison*	Granville, OH	W 13–0		
October 10	Georgetown (KY)*	Corcoran Field; Cincinnati, OH	W 27–6		
October 18	Centre*	Corcoran Field; Cincinnati, OH	L 0–6	10,000	
October 24	Wittenberg*	Corcoran Field; Cincinnati, OH	W 13–7		
November 1	Loyola (LA)*	Corcoran Field; Cincinnati, OH	L 6–27	6,000	
November 8	Dayton	Corcoran Field; Cincinnati, OH	L 0–7	10,000	
November 15	Western Reserve	Corcoran Field; Cincinnati, OH	W 52–0		
November 22	Kenyon	Corcoran Field; Cincinnati, OH	W 38–0		
November 27	Haskell*	Corcoran Field; Cincinnati, OH	L 7–33	8,000	
*Non-conference game
