= 1930 Dayton Flyers football team =

American college football season

1930 Dayton Flyers football
- Conference: Ohio Athletic Conference
- Record: 4–3–2 (2–0 OAC)
- Head coach: Harry Baujan (8th season)
- Home stadium: University of Dayton Stadium

1930 Ohio Athletic Conference football standings
	Conf.					Overall
Team	W		L		T	W		L		T
Muskingum $	3	–	0	–	1	6	–	1	–	1
Akron	5	–	1	–	0	7	–	1	–	0
Wooster	4	–	1	–	1	5	–	3	–	1
Xavier	2	–	1	–	0	6	–	4	–	0
Otterbein	3	–	2	–	0	4	–	3	–	1
Case	3	–	3	–	0	5	–	4	–	0
Mount Union	3	–	3	–	0	4	–	5	–	1
Marietta	2	–	2	–	0	3	–	5	–	0
Oberlin	2	–	4	–	0	2	–	6	–	0
Western Reserve	1	–	3	–	0	1	–	7	–	0
Ohio Northern	1	–	4	–	0	3	–	5	–	0
Baldwin–Wallace	1	–	5	–	0	1	–	6	–	0
Kenyon	0	–	4	–	1	1	–	6	–	1
Hiram	0	–	5	–	0	0	–	8	–	0
Heidelberg *	2	–	0	–	0	8	–	0	–	0
Dayton *	2	–	0	–	0	4	–	3	–	2
Capital *	4	–	0	–	1	5	–	1	–	1
$ – Conference champion; * – did not compete for championship

The 1930 Dayton Flyers Football Team was an American football team that represented the University of Dayton as a member of the Ohio Athletic Conference during the 1930 college football season. In its eighth season under head coach Harry Baujan, the team compiled a 4–3–2 record.

== Schedule ==
Date	Opponent	Site	Result	Attendance	Source
September 26	Ohio Northern	University of Dayton Stadium; Dayton, OH	W 14–0	8,000	
October 3	Georgetown (KY)	University of Dayton Stadium; Dayton, OH	W 22–0		
October 11	Ohio Wesleyan^{†}	University of Dayton Stadium; Dayton, OH	L 6–7		
October 17	Oglethorpe	University of Dayton Stadium; Dayton, OH	L 0–6		
October 25	at Boston College	Fenway Park; Boston, MA	L 6–15		
October 31	Transylvania	University of Dayton Stadium; Dayton, OH	T 6–6		
November 8	at Xavier	Corcoran Field; Cincinnati, OH	W 7–0	10,000	
November 14	at John Carroll	Luna Park Stadium; Cleveland, OH	T 0–0		
November 27	Wittenberg	University of Dayton Stadium; Dayton, OH	W 8–0		
^{†}Homecoming
