= Leland L. Mendenhall =

American sports coach and college athletics administrator

Biographical details
- Born: January 6, 1892; Earlham, Iowa, U.S.
- Died: October 4, 1970 (aged 78); Cedar Falls, Iowa, U.S.

Playing career

Football
- 1913: Drake
- 1916: Iowa
- Position: Halfback

Coaching career (HC unless noted)

Football
- 1917–1919: Boone HS (IA)
- 1920: Carleton (assistant)
- 1921–1924: Iowa State Teachers

Basketball
- 1917–1920: Boone HS (IA)
- 1920–1921: Carleton
- 1921–1924: Iowa State Teachers

Baseball
- 1921: Carleton
- 1922–1923: Iowa State Teachers

Administrative career (AD unless noted)
- 1921–1960: Iowa State Teachers

Head coaching record
- Overall: 15–11–2 (college football); 27–7 (college basketball, excluding Carleton)

Accomplishments and honors

Championships
- Basketball; 1 MIAC regular season (1921)

Leland Lester Mendenhall (January 6, 1892 – October 4, 1970) was an American football, basketball, baseball, and tennis coach and college athletics administrator. He served as the head football coach (1921 to 1924), head basketball coach (1921 to 1924) and head baseball coach (1922 to 1923) at the University of Northern Iowa (then known as Iowa State Teachers College) in Cedar Falls, Iowa. Mendenhall also coached tennis at Iowa State Teachers and was the school's athletic director.

Mendenhall was a 1916 football letter winner at the University of Iowa.

Mendenhall died on October 4, 1970, at Sartori Memorial Hospital in Cedar Falls.

== Head coaching record ==
=== College football ===
Year	Team	Overall	Conference	Standing	Bowl/playoffs
Iowa State Teachers (Independent) (1921)
1921	Iowa State Teachers	5–1–1			
Iowa State Teachers (Iowa Conference) (1922–1924)
1922	Iowa State Teachers	5–2			
1923	Iowa State Teachers	3–3–1			
1924	Iowa State Teachers	2–5	1–5	12th	
Iowa State Teachers:		15–11–2			
Total:		15–11–2			
