= James Owen Perrine =

American physicist

Biographical details
- Born: February 26, 1886; Bushnell, Illinois, U.S.
- Died: September 10, 1974 (aged 88); Cedar Falls, Iowa, U.S.
- Education: Iowa (BA, 1909 BA); Cornell (PhD)

Playing career

Football
- 1908: Iowa

Coaching career (HC unless noted)

Football
- 1910: Iowa State Teachers
- 1917: Iowa State Teachers

Basketball
- 1917–1918: Iowa State Teachers

Head coaching record
- Overall: 3–7–1 (football); 5–5 (basketball)

James Owen Perrine (February 26, 1886 – September 10, 1974) was an American physicist, college professor, developer of telephone technology, and coach of college football and college basketball.

== Athletic career ==
Perrine was a 1909 graduate of the University of Iowa, where he lettered in football on the 1908 team.

== Coaching career ==
Perrine served as the head football coach at the University of Northern Iowa–then known as Iowa State Teachers College–in Cedar Falls, Iowa in 1910 and 1917.

== Academic and business career ==
Perrine earned a bachelor's degree from the University of Iowa, a master's degree from the University of Michigan, and a doctorate in physics from Cornell University. He was a professor at the University of Northern Iowa and also lectured on physics at Yale University and Montclair State University. From 1939 to 1951, he was an assistant vice president at AT&T, where he developed transatlantic telephone technology and the dial telephone.

== Family and death ==
Perrine was born on February 26, 1886, in Bushnell, Illinois to Peter and Elizabeth Rockefeller Perrine. He married Blanch Albright on October 1, 1910, in Burlington, Iowa. Perrine died on September 10, 1974, at the Western Home in Cedar Falls, Iowa.

== Head coaching record ==
=== Football ===
Year	Team	Overall	Conference	Standing	Bowl/playoffs
Iowa State Teachers (Independent) (1910)
1910	Iowa State Teachers	1–4–1			
Iowa State Teachers (Independent) (1917)
1917	Iowa State Teachers	2–3			
Iowa State Teachers:		3–7–1			
Total:		3–7–1			
