= Allen P. Berkstresser =

American football coach

Biographical details
- Born: September 25, 1885; Mount Carroll, Illinois, U.S.
- Died: December 17, 1956 (aged 71)
- Education: Morningside (1910)

Coaching career (HC unless noted)

Football
- 1910–1912: Parsons
- 1913–1916: Iowa State Teachers

Basketball
- 1913–1917: Iowa State Teachers

Administrative career (AD unless noted)
- 1913–1917: Iowa State Teachers

Head coaching record
- Overall: 17–23–7 (football); 10–12 (basketball)

Allen Palmer Berkstresser (September 25, 1885 – December 17, 1956) was an American football and basketball coach and college athletic administrator. He served as the head football coach at Parsons College in Fairfield, Iowa from 1910 to 1912 and at Iowa State Teachers College—now known at the University of Northern Iowa—in Cedar Falls, Iowa from 1913 to 1916, compiling a career college football coaching record of 17–23–7. Berkstresser was also the head basketball coach at Iowa State Teachers from 1913 to 1917.

Berkstresser was a 1910 graduate of Morningside College in Sioux City, Iowa.

== Head coaching record ==
Year	Team	Overall	Conference	Standing	Bowl/playoffs
Parsons (Independent) (1910–1912)
1910	Parsons	3–0–3			
1911	Parsons	4–2–1			
1912	Parsons	2–3–1			
Parsons:		9–5–5			
Iowa State Teachers (Independent) (1913–1916)
1913	Iowa State Teachers	2–3–1			
1914	Iowa State Teachers	2–5–1			
1915	Iowa State Teachers	3–3			
1916	Iowa State Teachers	1–7			
Iowa State Teachers:		8–18–2			
Total:		17–23–7			
