= George B. Affleck =

American football and basketball coach (1874–1958)

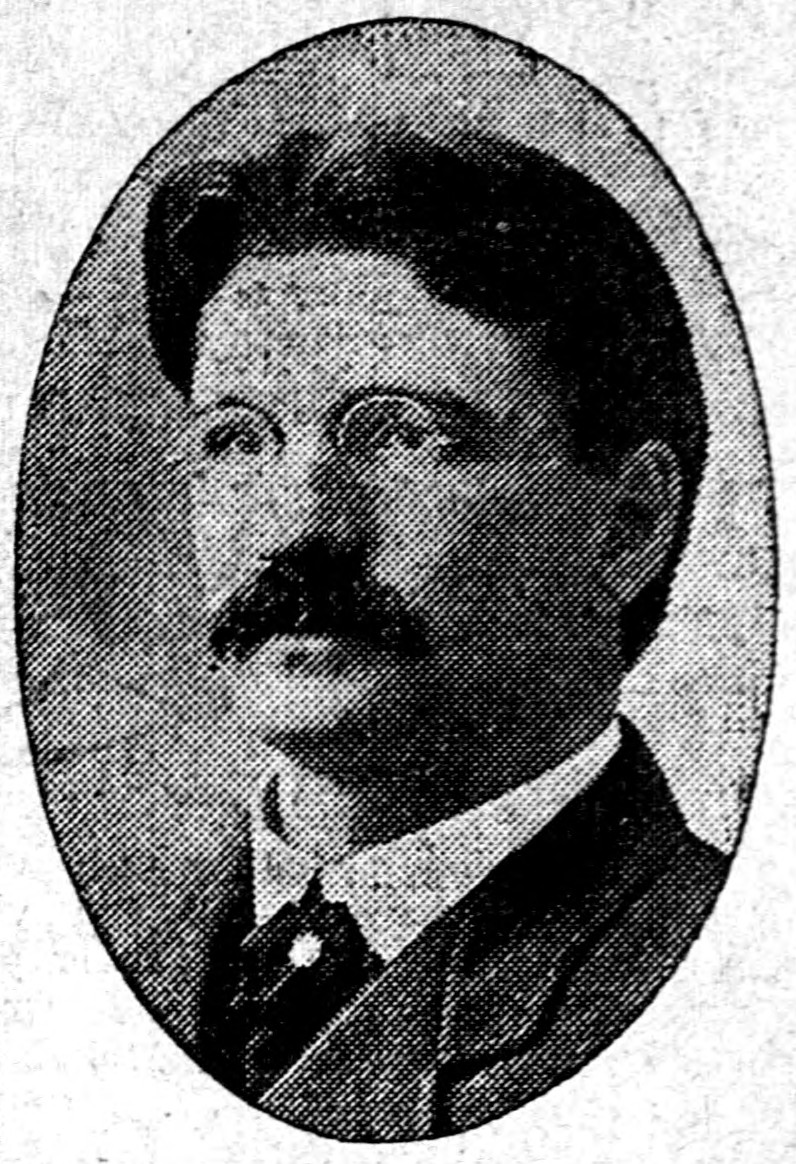
- Affleck, circa 1906

Biographical details
- Born: May 22, 1874; Middleville, Ontario, Canada
- Died: September 11, 1958 (aged 84); Springfield, Massachusetts, U.S.
- Education: Springfield (MA) YMCA Training School (1901)

Coaching career (HC unless noted)

Football
- 1901: Iowa State Normal

Basketball
- 1901–1902: Iowa State Normal

Head coaching record
- Overall: 5–3–2 (football); 1–2 (basketball)

George Baird Affleck (May 22, 1874 – September 11, 1958) was an American football and basketball coach. He served as the head football coach at Iowa State Normal School—now known as the University of Northern Iowa—in 1901, compiling a record of 5–3–2. Affleck was also the head basketball coach at Iowa State Normal for one season, in 1901–02, tallying a mark of 1–2. He later served as a professor at the Springfield YMCA training school—now known as Springfield College—in Springfield, Massachusetts from 1908 to 1941.

== Head coaching record ==
=== Football ===
Year	Team	Overall	Conference	Standing	Bowl/playoffs
Iowa State Normal (Independent) (1901)
1901	Iowa State Normal	5–3–2			
Iowa State Normal:		5–3–2			
Total:		5–3–2			
