= Pat Pasini =

American sports coach and administrator (1885–1964)

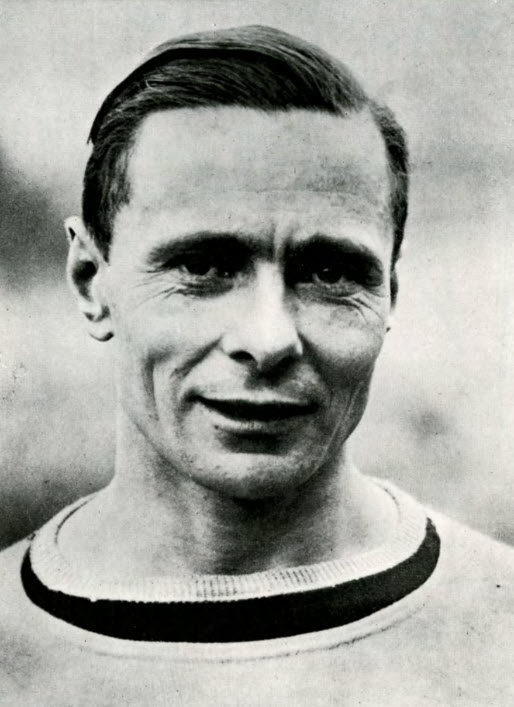

Biographical details
- Born: April 25, 1885; Buffalo, New York, U.S.
- Died: September 26, 1964 (aged 79); Willoughby, Ohio, U.S.

Playing career

Football
- 1909–1910: Springfield

Basketball
- c. 1910: Springfield

Baseball
- c. 1910: Springfield

Coaching career (HC unless noted)

Football
- 1911–1912: Iowa State Teachers
- 1913–1914: King
- 1917–1919: Case
- 1945: Kenyon

Basketball
- 1911–1913: Iowa State Teachers
- 1914–1915: King
- 1915–1924: Case
- 1942–1944: Kenyon
- 1945–1948: Kenyon

Baseball
- 1912–1913: Iowa State Teachers
- 1914: Harriman Boosters
- 1916–1921: Case

Administrative career (AD unless noted)
- 1917–1924: Case
- 1945–1951: Kenyon

Head coaching record
- Overall: 28–35–8 (college football)

Humbert Francis "Pat" Pasini (April 25, 1885 – September 26, 1964) was an American football, basketball, baseball, and track coach and college athletics administrator. He was the head football coach at Iowa State Teachers College—now known as the University of Northern Iowa–in Cedar Falls, Iowa from 1911 to 1912, King College—now known as King University—in Bristol, Tennessee from 1914 to 1915, Case Institute of Technology—now known as Case Western Reserve University—Cleveland, Ohio from 1917 to 1919, and Kenyon College in Gambier, Ohio in 1945.

Pasini attended Central High School in Cleveland and was a member of the 1905 basketball team. He later coached the team. Pasini attended Springfield College in Springfield, Massachusetts, where he played on the football, basketball, and baseball team. in 1914, he managed the Harriman Boosters of the Appalachian League, a Class D Minor League Baseball club.

Pasini died on September 26, 1964, at his home in Willoughby, Ohio.

== Head coaching record ==
=== College football ===
Year	Team	Overall	Conference	Standing	Bowl/playoffs
Iowa State Teachers (Independent) (1911–1912)
1911	Iowa State Teachers	3–2–1			
1912	Iowa State Teachers	5–2–1			
Iowa State Teachers:		8–4–2			
King (Independent) (1913–1914)
1913	King	6–2–1			
1914	King	5–6–1			
Iowa State Teachers:		11–8–2			
Case / Case Scientists (Ohio Athletic Conference) (1917–1919)
1917	Case	3–6–1	3–4–1	10th	
1918	Case	3–5–2	2–3–2	9th	
1919	Case	3–6–1	2–4–1	11th	
Case:		9–17–4	7–11–4		
Kenyon Lords (Ohio Athletic Conference) (1945)
1945	Kenyon	0–6	0–6	T–11th	
Kenyon:		0–6	0–6		
Total:		28–35–8			
