= Rio Grande RedStorm football =

College football team

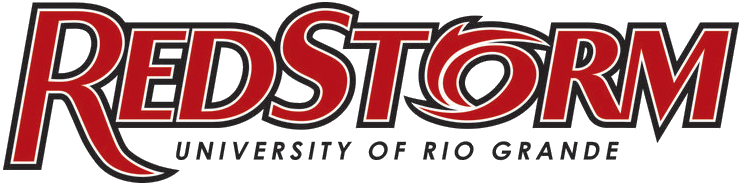
- First season: 1914; 112 years ago (Note: The program was discontinued in 1949. It was relaunched in 2025; 1 year ago.)
- Athletic director: Jeff Lanham
- Head coach: Mike Bartrum; 1st season, 0–0 (–)
- Location: Rio Grande, Ohio
- Stadium: Alumni Stadium (capacity: 6,000)
- Conference: AAC
- Colors: Red and white
- All-time record: 76–136–9 (.364)
- Website: rioredstorm.com/football

The Rio Grande RedStorm football team represents the University of Rio Grande in college football at the National Association of Intercollegiate Athletics (NAIA) level. The RedStorm have been members of the Appalachian Athletic Conference (AAC) since the program resumed play in 2025. The RedStorm play their home games at Jackson High School's Alumni Field in Jackson, Ohio.

Their head coach for the 2025 season was Mark Thurston, who took over the position during the 2024 season before the team began play. The school initially hired former NFL player and Fairmont State running backs coach Quincy Wilson to be their head coach, but he was fired during the 2024 season. Mike Bartrum was hired as head coach ahead of the 2026 season.

== Conference affiliations ==
- Appalachian Athletic Conference (2025–present)

== List of head coaches ==
=== Key ===
Key to symbols in coaches list
General		Overall		Conference		Postseason (Note: Although the first Rose Bowl Game was played in 1902, it has been continuously played since the 1916 game, and is recognized as the oldest bowl game by the NCAA. "—" indicates any season prior to 1916 when postseason games were not played.)	
No.	Order of coaches (Note: A running total of the number of head coaches, with coaches who served separate tenures being counted only once. Interim head coaches are represented with "Int" and are not counted in the running total. "—" indicates the team played but either without a coach or no coach is on record. "X" indicates an interim year without play.)	GC	Games coached	CW	Conference wins	PW	Postseason wins
DC	Division championships	OW	Overall wins	CL	Conference losses	PL	Postseason losses
CC	Conference championships	OL	Overall losses	CT	Conference ties	PT	Postseason ties
NC	National championships	OT	Overall ties (Note: Overtime rules in college football were introduced in 1996, making ties impossible in the period since.)	C%	Conference winning percentage		
†	Elected to the College Football Hall of Fame	O%	Overall winning percentage (Note: When computing the win–loss percentage, a tie counts as half a win and half a loss.)				

=== Coaches ===
List of head football coaches showing season(s) coached, overall records, conference records, postseason records, championships and selected awards
No.	Name	Season(s)	GC	OW	OL	OT	O%	CW	CL	CT	C%	PW	PL	PT	DC	CC	NC	Awards
-	Unknown	1914, 1917, 1919, 1922, 1939, 1946–1947	38	13	22	3	0.382	0	0	0	–	0	0	0	0	0	0	0
1	Davis	1915–1916	12	7	4	1	0.625	0	0	0	–	0	0	0	0	0	0	0
2	Kendall B. Taft	1920	6	5	0	1	0.917	0	0	0	–	0	0	0	0	0	0	0
3	Lester Berridge	1921	8	4	4	0	0.500	0	0	0	–	0	0	0	0	0	0	0
4	Paul R. Lyne	1923–1929, 1931–1937	97	38	55	4	0.412	0	0	0	–	0	0	0	0	0	0	0
5	Spooner	1930	6	0	6	0	.000	0	0	0	–	0	0	0	0	0	0	0
6	Ray Troth	1938	4	0	4	0	.000	0	0	0	–	0	0	0	0	0	0	0
7	Forrest Wyatt	1940	8	0	8	0	.000	0	0	0	–	0	0	0	0	0	0	0
8	Mendell Beattie	1941–1943, 1945	23	4	19	0	0.174	0	0	0	–	0	0	0	0	0	0	0
9	Paul Sager	1948	9	3	6	0	0.333	0	0	0	–	0	0	0	0	0	0	0
10	Christy E. Arnold	1949	10	2	8	0	0.200	0	0	0	–	0	0	0	0	0	0	0
11	Mark Thurston	2025	9	0	9	0	.000	0	6	0	.000	0	0	0	0	0	0	0

== Year-by-year results ==
National champions	Conference champions	Bowl game berth	Playoff berth

Season	Year	Head coach	Association	Division	Conference	Record							Postseason	Final ranking
Season	Year	Head coach	Association	Division	Conference	Overall			Conference				Postseason	Final ranking
Season	Year	Head coach	Association	Division	Conference	Win	Loss	Tie	Finish	Win	Loss	Tie	Postseason	Final ranking
Rio Grande Redmen
1914	1914	Unknown	—	—	—	0	1	0	—	—	—	—	—	—
1915	1915	Davis	—	—	—	3	2	1	—	—	—	—	—	—
1916	1916	Davis	—	—	—	4	2	0	—	—	—	—	—	—
1917	1917	Unknown	—	—	—	0	1	0	—	—	—	—	—	—
No team in 1918
1919	1919	Unknown	—	—	—	3	4	1	—	—	—	—	—	—
1920	1920	Kendall B. Taft	—	—	—	5	0	1	—	—	—	—	—	—
1921	1921	Lester Berridge	—	—	—	4	4	0	—	—	—	—	—	—
1922	1922	Unknown	—	—	—	2	3	1	—	—	—	—	—	—
1923	1923	Paul R. Lyne	—	—	—	3	4	0	—	—	—	—	—	—
1924	1924	Paul R. Lyne	—	—	—	4	4	0	—	—	—	—	—	—
1925	1925	Paul R. Lyne	—	—	—	3	3	1	—	—	—	—	—	—
1926	1926	Paul R. Lyne	—	—	—	2	5	0	—	—	—	—	—	—
1927	1927	Paul R. Lyne	—	—	—	1	6	0	—	—	—	—	—	—
1928	1928	Paul R. Lyne	—	—	—	4	5	0	—	—	—	—	—	—
1929	1929	Paul R. Lyne	—	—	—	2	5	0	—	—	—	—	—	—
1930	1930	Spooner	—	—	—	0	6	0	—	—	—	—	—	—
1931	1931	Paul R. Lyne	—	—	—	6	2	0	—	—	—	—	—	—
1932	1932	Paul R. Lyne	—	—	—	3	4	0	—	—	—	—	—	—
1933	1933	Paul R. Lyne	—	—	—	4	1	0	—	—	—	—	—	—
1934	1934	Paul R. Lyne	—	—	—	0	5	1	—	—	—	—	—	—
1935	1935	Paul R. Lyne	—	—	—	2	3	1	—	—	—	—	—	—
1936	1936	Paul R. Lyne	—	—	—	2	5	0	—	—	—	—	—	—
1937	1937	Paul R. Lyne	—	—	—	2	3	1	—	—	—	—	—	—
1938	1938	Ray Troth	—	—	—	0	4	0	—	—	—	—	—	—
1939	1939	Unknown	—	—	—	0	5	1	—	—	—	—	—	—
1940	1940	Forrest Wyatt	NAIA	—	—	0	8	0	—	—	—	—	—	—
1941	1941	Mendell Beattie	NAIA	—	—	0	8	0	—	—	—	—	—	—
1942	1942	Mendell Beattie	NAIA	—	—	0	4	0	—	—	—	—	—	—
1943	1943	Mendell Beattie	NAIA	—	—	2	3	0	—	—	—	—	—	—
No team in 1944
1945	1945	Mendell Beattie	NAIA			2	4	0	—	—	—	—	—	—
1946	1946	Unknown	NAIA			5	2	0	—	—	—	—	—	—
1947	1947	Unknown	NAIA			3	6	0	—	—	—	—	—	—
1948	1948	Paul Sager	NAIA			3	6	0	—	—	—	—	—	—
1949	1949	Christy E. Arnold	NAIA			2	8	0	—	—	—	—	—	—
No team from 1950 to 2024
2025	2025	Mark Thurston	NAIA	—	AAC	0	9	0	7	0	6	0	—	—
