= 1944 Miami Naval Training Center Navaltars football team =

American college football season

1944 Miami Naval Training Center Navaltars football
- Conference: Independent
- Record: 2–8
- Head coach: Philip S. Fox (1st season)
- Home stadium: Burdine Stadium

1944 military service football records
	Conf.			Overall
Team	W	L	T	W		L		T
No. 3 Randolph Field		–		11	–	0	–	0
No. 5 Bainbridge		–		10	–	0	–	0
No. 18 Fort Pierce		–		9	–	0	–	0
No. T–13 Norman NAS		–		6	–	0	–	0
No. 6 Iowa Pre-Flight		–		10	–	1	–	0
No. 16 El Toro Marines		–		8	–	1	–	0
Hondo AAF		–		7	–	1	–	0
Bunker Hill NAS		–		6	–	1	–	0
Lincoln AAF		–		6	–	1	–	0
Blackland AAF		–		7	–	1	–	1
Keesler Field		–		8	–	1	–	2
No. 17 Great Lakes Navy		–		9	–	2	–	1
No. 10 March Field		–		7	–	2	–	2
Third Air Force		–		8	–	3	–	0
North Carolina Pre-Flight		–		6	–	2	–	1
Atlantic City NAS		–		5	–	2	–	0
Camp Peary		–		5	–	2	–	0
Tonopah AAF		–		5	–	2	–	0
Daniel Field		–		7	–	3	–	0
No. 20 Second Air Force		–		10	–	4	–	1
San Francisco Coast Guard		–		4	–	2	–	1
Ellington Field		–		6	–	3	–	2
Amarillo AAF		–		5	–	3	–	0
Alameda Coast Guard		–		4	–	2	–	2
Coronado Amphibious		–		2	–	1	–	1
Olathe NAS		–		4	–	2	–	2
Selman Field		–		4	–	2	–	2
Galveston AAF		–		5	–	3	–	2
Fleet City		–		6	–	4	–	1
Jacksonville NAS		–		4	–	3	–	0
San Diego NTS		–		4	–	3	–	1
Camp Beale		–		5	–	4	–	0
Lubbock AAF		–		5	–	4	–	0
Fort Warren		–		5	–	4	–	1
Fort Monroe		–		5	–	5	–	0
Klamath Falls Marines		–		2	–	2	–	1
Maxwell Field		–		5	–	5	–	0
Minter Field		–		3	–	3	–	0
No. 19 Saint Mary's Pre-Flight		–		4	–	4	–	0
Fourth Infantry		–		3	–	4	–	2
Georgia Pre-Flight		–		4	–	5	–	0
Third Infantry		–		4	–	5	–	0
Melville PT Boats		–		3	–	0	–	0
Bergstrom Field		–		3	–	4	–	0
Ottumwa NAS		–		3	–	4	–	0
Camp Lee		–		3	–	5	–	0
Cherry Point Marines		–		3	–	6	–	0
Chatham Field		–		2	–	8	–	1
Sampton NTS		–		2	–	7	–	0
Miami NTC		–		2	–	8	–	0
Bryan AAF		–		1	–	7	–	0
Fairfield-Suisun AAB		–		1	–	7	–	0
Richmond AAB		–		0	–	10	–	1
Camp Ellis		–		0	–	5	–	0
South Plains AAF		–		0	–	8	–	0
Rankings from AP Poll

The 1944 Miami Naval Training Center Navaltars football team represented United States Navy's Miami Naval Training Center (Miami NTC) during the 1944 college football season. Led by head coach Philip S. Fox, the Navaltars compiled a record of 2–8. The team's roster included George Connor, Bernie Digris, and Warren Giese.

In the final Litkenhous Ratings, Miami NTC ranked 155th among the nation's college and service teams and 21st out of 28 United States Navy teams with a rating of 57.1.

== Schedule ==
Date	Time	Opponent	Site	Result	Attendance	Source
September 30	8:15 p.m.	Daniel Field	Burdine Stadium; Miami, FL	L 7–18	7,841	
October 8	3:15 p.m.	Fort Pierce	Burdine Stadium; Miami, FL	L 7–40		
October 14		at Jacksonville NAS	Mason Field; Jacksonville, FL	L 13–39	5,000	
October 22	3:15 p.m.	Third Infantry	Burdine Stadium; Miami, FL	L 7–41		
October 28	8:00 p.m.	at Fort Pierce	Jaycee Field; Fort Pierce, FL	L 0–70		
November 11		at Daniel Field	Augusta Municipal Stadium; Augusta, GA	L 6–19		
November 19		at Third Infantry	Fort Benning, GA	L 6–7		
November 21	8:15 p.m.	University of Havana	Burdine Stadium; Miami, FL	W 30–13		
November 25	8:15 p.m.	Maxwell Field	Burdine Stadium; Miami, FL	L 0–13		
December 2		Lakeland AAF		?		
December ?		Bartow AAF		W 26–0		
All times are in Eastern time
