= 1944 Third Infantry Cockades football team =

College football season

1944 Third Infantry Cockades football
- Conference: Independent
- Record: 4–5
- Head coach: Charles E. Ziogas (1st season)
- Home stadium: Doughboy Stadium

1944 military service football records
	Conf.			Overall
Team	W	L	T	W		L		T
No. 3 Randolph Field		–		11	–	0	–	0
No. 5 Bainbridge		–		10	–	0	–	0
No. 18 Fort Pierce		–		9	–	0	–	0
No. T–13 Norman NAS		–		6	–	0	–	0
No. 6 Iowa Pre-Flight		–		10	–	1	–	0
No. 16 El Toro Marines		–		8	–	1	–	0
Hondo AAF		–		7	–	1	–	0
Bunker Hill NAS		–		6	–	1	–	0
Lincoln AAF		–		6	–	1	–	0
Blackland AAF		–		7	–	1	–	1
Keesler Field		–		8	–	1	–	2
No. 17 Great Lakes Navy		–		9	–	2	–	1
No. 10 March Field		–		7	–	2	–	2
Third Air Force		–		8	–	3	–	0
North Carolina Pre-Flight		–		6	–	2	–	1
Atlantic City NAS		–		5	–	2	–	0
Camp Peary		–		5	–	2	–	0
Tonopah AAF		–		5	–	2	–	0
Daniel Field		–		7	–	3	–	0
No. 20 Second Air Force		–		10	–	4	–	1
San Francisco Coast Guard		–		4	–	2	–	1
Ellington Field		–		6	–	3	–	2
Amarillo AAF		–		5	–	3	–	0
Alameda Coast Guard		–		4	–	2	–	2
Coronado Amphibious		–		2	–	1	–	1
Olathe NAS		–		4	–	2	–	2
Selman Field		–		4	–	2	–	2
Galveston AAF		–		5	–	3	–	2
Fleet City		–		6	–	4	–	1
Jacksonville NAS		–		4	–	3	–	0
San Diego NTS		–		4	–	3	–	1
Camp Beale		–		5	–	4	–	0
Lubbock AAF		–		5	–	4	–	0
Fort Warren		–		5	–	4	–	1
Fort Monroe		–		5	–	5	–	0
Klamath Falls Marines		–		2	–	2	–	1
Maxwell Field		–		5	–	5	–	0
Minter Field		–		3	–	3	–	0
No. 19 Saint Mary's Pre-Flight		–		4	–	4	–	0
Fourth Infantry		–		3	–	4	–	2
Georgia Pre-Flight		–		4	–	5	–	0
Third Infantry		–		4	–	5	–	0
Melville PT Boats		–		3	–	0	–	0
Bergstrom Field		–		3	–	4	–	0
Ottumwa NAS		–		3	–	4	–	0
Camp Lee		–		3	–	5	–	0
Cherry Point Marines		–		3	–	6	–	0
Chatham Field		–		2	–	8	–	1
Sampton NTS		–		2	–	7	–	0
Miami NTC		–		2	–	8	–	0
Bryan AAF		–		1	–	7	–	0
Fairfield-Suisun AAB		–		1	–	7	–	0
Richmond AAB		–		0	–	10	–	1
Camp Ellis		–		0	–	5	–	0
South Plains AAF		–		0	–	8	–	0
Rankings from AP Poll

The 1944 Third Infantry Cockades football team represented the Third Infantry Regiment of the United States Army Infantry School at Fort Benning, located near Columbus, Georgia, during the 1944 college football season. Led by head coach Charles E. Ziogas, the Cockades compiled a record of 4–5. Clem Stevens served as the team's backfield coach and also played. The Cockades' roster included Billy Hillenbrand, Bill Reinhard, and Lou Saban.

In the final Litkenhous Ratings, Third Infantry ranked 100th among the nation's college and service teams and 15th out of 63 United States Army teams with a rating of 73.0.

== Schedule ==
Date	Time	Opponent	Site	Result	Attendance	Source
October 1	3:30 p.m.	at Maxwell Field	Cramton Bowl; Montgomery, AL	W 26–0	15,000	
October 7	3:30 p.m.	at Third Air Force	Carolina Stadium; Columbia, SC	L 0–22	12,000	
October 15	2:00 p.m.	vs. Fourth Infantry	Doughboy Stadium; Fort Benning, GA	L 6–14	22,000	
October 22	3:15 p.m.	at Miami NTC	Burdine Stadium; Miami, FL	W 41–7		
October 28	8:00 p.m.	Fort Knox	Doughboy Stadium; Fort Benning, GA	W 19–0	20,000	
November 12	2:00 p.m.	Jacksonville NAS	Doughboy Stadium; Fort Benning, GA	L 13–35	25,000	
November 19		Miami NTC	Fort Benning, GA	W 7–6		
November 27	3:15 p.m.	at Keesler Field	Biloxi, MS	L 0–19	12,000	
December 3	2:00 p.m.	vs. Fourth Infantry	Doughboy Stadium; Fort Benning, GA	L 7–9	18,000	
All times are in Eastern time
