= 1944 Daniel Field Fliers football team =

American college football season

1944 Daniel Field Fliers football
- Conference: Independent
- Record: 7–3
- Head coach: Hank Stovall (2nd season)
- Home stadium: Augusta Municipal Stadium

1944 military service football records
	Conf.			Overall
Team	W	L	T	W		L		T
No. 3 Randolph Field		–		11	–	0	–	0
No. 5 Bainbridge		–		10	–	0	–	0
No. 18 Fort Pierce		–		9	–	0	–	0
No. T–13 Norman NAS		–		6	–	0	–	0
No. 6 Iowa Pre-Flight		–		10	–	1	–	0
No. 16 El Toro Marines		–		8	–	1	–	0
Hondo AAF		–		7	–	1	–	0
Bunker Hill NAS		–		6	–	1	–	0
Lincoln AAF		–		6	–	1	–	0
Blackland AAF		–		7	–	1	–	1
Keesler Field		–		8	–	1	–	2
No. 17 Great Lakes Navy		–		9	–	2	–	1
No. 10 March Field		–		7	–	2	–	2
Third Air Force		–		8	–	3	–	0
North Carolina Pre-Flight		–		6	–	2	–	1
Atlantic City NAS		–		5	–	2	–	0
Camp Peary		–		5	–	2	–	0
Tonopah AAF		–		5	–	2	–	0
Daniel Field		–		7	–	3	–	0
No. 20 Second Air Force		–		10	–	4	–	1
San Francisco Coast Guard		–		4	–	2	–	1
Ellington Field		–		6	–	3	–	2
Amarillo AAF		–		5	–	3	–	0
Alameda Coast Guard		–		4	–	2	–	2
Coronado Amphibious		–		2	–	1	–	1
Olathe NAS		–		4	–	2	–	2
Selman Field		–		4	–	2	–	2
Galveston AAF		–		5	–	3	–	2
Fleet City		–		6	–	4	–	1
Jacksonville NAS		–		4	–	3	–	0
San Diego NTS		–		4	–	3	–	1
Camp Beale		–		5	–	4	–	0
Lubbock AAF		–		5	–	4	–	0
Fort Warren		–		5	–	4	–	1
Fort Monroe		–		5	–	5	–	0
Klamath Falls Marines		–		2	–	2	–	1
Maxwell Field		–		5	–	5	–	0
Minter Field		–		3	–	3	–	0
No. 19 Saint Mary's Pre-Flight		–		4	–	4	–	0
Fourth Infantry		–		3	–	4	–	2
Georgia Pre-Flight		–		4	–	5	–	0
Third Infantry		–		4	–	5	–	0
Melville PT Boats		–		3	–	0	–	0
Bergstrom Field		–		3	–	4	–	0
Ottumwa NAS		–		3	–	4	–	0
Camp Lee		–		3	–	5	–	0
Cherry Point Marines		–		3	–	6	–	0
Chatham Field		–		2	–	8	–	1
Sampton NTS		–		2	–	7	–	0
Miami NTC		–		2	–	8	–	0
Bryan AAF		–		1	–	7	–	0
Fairfield-Suisun AAB		–		1	–	7	–	0
Richmond AAB		–		0	–	10	–	1
Camp Ellis		–		0	–	5	–	0
South Plains AAF		–		0	–	8	–	0
Rankings from AP Poll

The 1944 Daniel Field Fliers football team represented United States Army Air Forces' Daniel Field, located near Augusta, Georgia, during the 1944 college football season. Led by head coach Hank Stovall, the Fliers compiled a record of 6–3.

In the final Litkenhous Ratings, Daniel Field ranked 147th among the nation's college and service teams and 27th out of 63 United States Army teams with a rating of 58.3.

== Schedule ==
Date	Time	Opponent	Site	Result	Attendance	Source
September 30	8:15 p.m.	at Miami NTC	Burdine Stadium; Miami, FL	W 18–7	7,841	
October 7		Mayport NAS	Augusta Municipal Stadium; Augusta, GA	W 13–0		
October 15		at Charleston Coast Guard	Johnson Hagood Stadium; Charleston, SC	W 19–14		
October 20		at Georgia	Sanford Stadium; Athens, GA	L 6–53	3,000	
October 28		at Mayport NAS	Cromer Schuler Field; Jacksonville Beach, FL	W 15–7		
November 4		Charleston Coast Guard	Augusta Municipal Stadium; Augusta, GA	W 20–13		
November 11		Miami NTC	Augusta Municipal Stadium; Augusta, GA	W 19–6		
November 19		at Georgia Pre-Flight	Sanford Stadium; Athens, GA	L 0–30		
November 26		Georgia Pre-Flight	Augusta Municipal Stadium; Augusta, GA	L 12–52		
December 1		Newberry	Augusta Municipal Stadium; Augusta, GA	W 28–7		
All times are in Eastern time
