= 1944 Minter Field Fliers football team =

College football season

1944 Minter Field Fliers football
- Conference: Independent
- Record: 3–3
- Head coach: Jim Dildy (1st season)
- Home stadium: Minter Athletic Field, Griffith Field

1944 military service football records
	Conf.			Overall
Team	W	L	T	W		L		T
No. 3 Randolph Field		–		11	–	0	–	0
No. 5 Bainbridge		–		10	–	0	–	0
No. 18 Fort Pierce		–		9	–	0	–	0
No. T–13 Norman NAS		–		6	–	0	–	0
No. 6 Iowa Pre-Flight		–		10	–	1	–	0
No. 16 El Toro Marines		–		8	–	1	–	0
Hondo AAF		–		7	–	1	–	0
Bunker Hill NAS		–		6	–	1	–	0
Lincoln AAF		–		6	–	1	–	0
Blackland AAF		–		7	–	1	–	1
Keesler Field		–		8	–	1	–	2
No. 17 Great Lakes Navy		–		9	–	2	–	1
No. 10 March Field		–		7	–	2	–	2
Third Air Force		–		8	–	3	–	0
North Carolina Pre-Flight		–		6	–	2	–	1
Atlantic City NAS		–		5	–	2	–	0
Camp Peary		–		5	–	2	–	0
Tonopah AAF		–		5	–	2	–	0
Daniel Field		–		7	–	3	–	0
No. 20 Second Air Force		–		10	–	4	–	1
San Francisco Coast Guard		–		4	–	2	–	1
Ellington Field		–		6	–	3	–	2
Amarillo AAF		–		5	–	3	–	0
Alameda Coast Guard		–		4	–	2	–	2
Coronado Amphibious		–		2	–	1	–	1
Olathe NAS		–		4	–	2	–	2
Selman Field		–		4	–	2	–	2
Galveston AAF		–		5	–	3	–	2
Fleet City		–		6	–	4	–	1
Jacksonville NAS		–		4	–	3	–	0
San Diego NTS		–		4	–	3	–	1
Camp Beale		–		5	–	4	–	0
Lubbock AAF		–		5	–	4	–	0
Fort Warren		–		5	–	4	–	1
Fort Monroe		–		5	–	5	–	0
Klamath Falls Marines		–		2	–	2	–	1
Maxwell Field		–		5	–	5	–	0
Minter Field		–		3	–	3	–	0
No. 19 Saint Mary's Pre-Flight		–		4	–	4	–	0
Fourth Infantry		–		3	–	4	–	2
Georgia Pre-Flight		–		4	–	5	–	0
Third Infantry		–		4	–	5	–	0
Melville PT Boats		–		3	–	0	–	0
Bergstrom Field		–		3	–	4	–	0
Ottumwa NAS		–		3	–	4	–	0
Camp Lee		–		3	–	5	–	0
Cherry Point Marines		–		3	–	6	–	0
Chatham Field		–		2	–	8	–	1
Sampton NTS		–		2	–	7	–	0
Miami NTC		–		2	–	8	–	0
Bryan AAF		–		1	–	7	–	0
Fairfield-Suisun AAB		–		1	–	7	–	0
Richmond AAB		–		0	–	10	–	1
Camp Ellis		–		0	–	5	–	0
South Plains AAF		–		0	–	8	–	0
Rankings from AP Poll

The 1944 Minter Field Fliers football team represented the United States Army Air Forces' Minter Field, located near Bakersfield, California, during the 1944 college football season. Led by head coach Jim Dildy, the Fliers compiled a record 3–3.

In the final Litkenhous Ratings, Minter Field ranked 114th among the nation's college and service teams and 19th out of 63 United States Army teams with a rating of 68.0.

== Schedule ==
Date	Time	Opponent	Site	Result	Attendance	Source
October 21	10:00 a.m.	Fresno State	Minter Athletic Field; Bakersfield, CA	W 20–0		
November 4	10:00 a.m.	Coronado Amphibious	Minter Athletic Field; Bakersfield, CA	L 0–7		
November 11		at Fresno State	Ratcliffe Stadium; Fresno, CA	W 13–0	300	
November 17		at Coronado Amphibious	Coronado, CA	L 18–25		
November 23	7:30 p.m.	Gardner Field	Griffith Field; Bakersfield, CA	W 13–7	4,800	
December 1		at Gardner Field	Taft High School Stadium; Taft, CA	L 18–0	4,000–5,000	
All times are in Pacific time
