= 1944 Richmond Army Air Base Thunderbyrds football team =

American college football season

1944 Richmond Army Air Base Thunderbyrds football
- Conference: Independent
- Record: 0–10–1
- Head coach: John C. Anderson (2nd season)
- Home stadium: Base gridiron

1944 military service football records
	Conf.			Overall
Team	W	L	T	W		L		T
No. 3 Randolph Field		–		11	–	0	–	0
No. 5 Bainbridge		–		10	–	0	–	0
No. 18 Fort Pierce		–		9	–	0	–	0
No. T–13 Norman NAS		–		6	–	0	–	0
No. 6 Iowa Pre-Flight		–		10	–	1	–	0
No. 16 El Toro Marines		–		8	–	1	–	0
Hondo AAF		–		7	–	1	–	0
Bunker Hill NAS		–		6	–	1	–	0
Lincoln AAF		–		6	–	1	–	0
Blackland AAF		–		7	–	1	–	1
Keesler Field		–		8	–	1	–	2
No. 17 Great Lakes Navy		–		9	–	2	–	1
No. 10 March Field		–		7	–	2	–	2
Third Air Force		–		8	–	3	–	0
North Carolina Pre-Flight		–		6	–	2	–	1
Atlantic City NAS		–		5	–	2	–	0
Camp Peary		–		5	–	2	–	0
Tonopah AAF		–		5	–	2	–	0
Daniel Field		–		7	–	3	–	0
No. 20 Second Air Force		–		10	–	4	–	1
San Francisco Coast Guard		–		4	–	2	–	1
Ellington Field		–		6	–	3	–	2
Amarillo AAF		–		5	–	3	–	0
Alameda Coast Guard		–		4	–	2	–	2
Coronado Amphibious		–		2	–	1	–	1
Olathe NAS		–		4	–	2	–	2
Selman Field		–		4	–	2	–	2
Galveston AAF		–		5	–	3	–	2
Fleet City		–		6	–	4	–	1
Jacksonville NAS		–		4	–	3	–	0
San Diego NTS		–		4	–	3	–	1
Camp Beale		–		5	–	4	–	0
Lubbock AAF		–		5	–	4	–	0
Fort Warren		–		5	–	4	–	1
Fort Monroe		–		5	–	5	–	0
Klamath Falls Marines		–		2	–	2	–	1
Maxwell Field		–		5	–	5	–	0
Minter Field		–		3	–	3	–	0
No. 19 Saint Mary's Pre-Flight		–		4	–	4	–	0
Fourth Infantry		–		3	–	4	–	2
Georgia Pre-Flight		–		4	–	5	–	0
Third Infantry		–		4	–	5	–	0
Melville PT Boats		–		3	–	0	–	0
Bergstrom Field		–		3	–	4	–	0
Ottumwa NAS		–		3	–	4	–	0
Camp Lee		–		3	–	5	–	0
Cherry Point Marines		–		3	–	6	–	0
Chatham Field		–		2	–	8	–	1
Sampton NTS		–		2	–	7	–	0
Miami NTC		–		2	–	8	–	0
Bryan AAF		–		1	–	7	–	0
Fairfield-Suisun AAB		–		1	–	7	–	0
Richmond AAB		–		0	–	10	–	1
Camp Ellis		–		0	–	5	–	0
South Plains AAF		–		0	–	8	–	0
Rankings from AP Poll

The 1944 Richmond Army Air Base Thunderbyrds football team represented the United States Army Air Forces's Richmond Army Air Base (Richmond AAB or RAAB) near Richmond, Virginia during the 1944 college football season. Led by head coach John C. Anderson, the Thunderbyrds compiled a record of 0–10–1. Major Anderson was assisted by Captain George Philbrook. Richmond AAB originally scheduled two games with Camp Peary, on September 23 and October 29, but cancelled those games in early September.

In the final Litkenhous Ratings, Richmond AAB ranked 257th among the nation's college and service teams and 54th out of 63 United States Army teams with a rating of 28.7.

== Schedule ==
Date	Time	Opponent	Site	Result	Attendance	Source
September 16		at Hampden–Sydney	Venable Field; Hampden Sydney, VA	T 0–0	1,200	
September 24		Fort Monroe	Base gridiron; Richmond, VA	L 6–7		
September 30	8:15 p.m.	at Richmond	City Stadium; Richmond, VA	L 0–34		
October 7	2:30 p.m.	at Fort Monroe	Hampton, VA	L 0–13		
October 15	2:30 p.m.	Camp Lee	Richmond, VA	L 0–18		
October 21	2:30 p.m.	at William & Mary	Cary Field; Williamsburg, VA	L 0–39	3,000	
October 29	2:30 p.m.	at Norfolk Fleet	Fleet Recreation Park; Norfolk, VA	L 2–13		
November 4	8:15 p.m.	at Catawba	Salisburg, NC	L 0–33	2,000	
November 12	2:00 p.m.	at Camp Lee	Camp Lee, VA	L 0–35		
November 18		at Navy plebes	Annapolis, MD	L 0–58		
November 26	2:30 p.m.	Camp Detrick	Richmond, VA	L 0–34		
All times are in Eastern time
