= 1944 Olathe Naval Air Station Clippers football team =

American college football season

1944 Olathe Naval Air Station Clippers football
- Conference: Independent
- Record: 4–2–2
- Head coach: Paul A. Holstein (1st season)

1944 military service football records
	Conf.			Overall
Team	W	L	T	W		L		T
No. 3 Randolph Field		–		11	–	0	–	0
No. 5 Bainbridge		–		10	–	0	–	0
No. 18 Fort Pierce		–		9	–	0	–	0
No. T–13 Norman NAS		–		6	–	0	–	0
No. 6 Iowa Pre-Flight		–		10	–	1	–	0
No. 16 El Toro Marines		–		8	–	1	–	0
Hondo AAF		–		7	–	1	–	0
Bunker Hill NAS		–		6	–	1	–	0
Lincoln AAF		–		6	–	1	–	0
Blackland AAF		–		7	–	1	–	1
Keesler Field		–		8	–	1	–	2
No. 17 Great Lakes Navy		–		9	–	2	–	1
No. 10 March Field		–		7	–	2	–	2
Third Air Force		–		8	–	3	–	0
North Carolina Pre-Flight		–		6	–	2	–	1
Atlantic City NAS		–		5	–	2	–	0
Camp Peary		–		5	–	2	–	0
Tonopah AAF		–		5	–	2	–	0
Daniel Field		–		7	–	3	–	0
No. 20 Second Air Force		–		10	–	4	–	1
San Francisco Coast Guard		–		4	–	2	–	1
Ellington Field		–		6	–	3	–	2
Amarillo AAF		–		5	–	3	–	0
Alameda Coast Guard		–		4	–	2	–	2
Coronado Amphibious		–		2	–	1	–	1
Olathe NAS		–		4	–	2	–	2
Selman Field		–		4	–	2	–	2
Galveston AAF		–		5	–	3	–	2
Fleet City		–		6	–	4	–	1
Jacksonville NAS		–		4	–	3	–	0
San Diego NTS		–		4	–	3	–	1
Camp Beale		–		5	–	4	–	0
Lubbock AAF		–		5	–	4	–	0
Fort Warren		–		5	–	4	–	1
Fort Monroe		–		5	–	5	–	0
Klamath Falls Marines		–		2	–	2	–	1
Maxwell Field		–		5	–	5	–	0
Minter Field		–		3	–	3	–	0
No. 19 Saint Mary's Pre-Flight		–		4	–	4	–	0
Fourth Infantry		–		3	–	4	–	2
Georgia Pre-Flight		–		4	–	5	–	0
Third Infantry		–		4	–	5	–	0
Melville PT Boats		–		3	–	0	–	0
Bergstrom Field		–		3	–	4	–	0
Ottumwa NAS		–		3	–	4	–	0
Camp Lee		–		3	–	5	–	0
Cherry Point Marines		–		3	–	6	–	0
Chatham Field		–		2	–	8	–	1
Sampton NTS		–		2	–	7	–	0
Miami NTC		–		2	–	8	–	0
Bryan AAF		–		1	–	7	–	0
Fairfield-Suisun AAB		–		1	–	7	–	0
Richmond AAB		–		0	–	10	–	1
Camp Ellis		–		0	–	5	–	0
South Plains AAF		–		0	–	8	–	0
Rankings from AP Poll

The 1944 Olathe Naval Air Station Clippers football team represented United States Navy's Naval Air Station Olathe (Olathe NAS) in Gardner, Kansas during the 1944 college football season. Led by head coach Paul A. Holstein, the Clippers compiled a record of 4–2–2.

In the final Litkenhous Ratings, Olathe NAS ranked 128th among the nation's college and service teams and 18th out of 28 United States Navy teams with a rating of 62.0.

== Schedule ==
Date	Time	Opponent	Site	Result	Attendance	Source
September 23	3:00 p.m.	Pittsburg State	Olathe, KS	W 6–0		
September 30		at Iowa Pre-Flight	Iowa Stadium; Iowa City, IA	L 12–45	5,000	
October 14	2:30 p.m.	Wichita	Olathe, KS	W 13–0		
October 21	3:00 p.m.	at Fort Riley	Fort Riley Post stadium; Fort Riley, KS	W 20–0		
October 28		Fort Riley	Olathe, KS	T 6–6		
November 4		at Kansas	Memorial Stadium; Lawrence, KS	L 14–33		
November 11		Central Missouri State	Warrensburg, MO	W 13–12		
November 18	2:00 p.m.	at Kansas State	Memorial Stadium; Manhattan, KS	T 0–0		
All times are in Central time
