= 1944 Tonopah Army Air Field Indians football team =

American college football season

1944 Tonopah Army Air Field Indians football
- Conference: Independent
- Record: 5–2
- Head coach: George Solari (1st season)
- Home stadium: Sagebrush Bowl

1944 military service football records
	Conf.			Overall
Team	W	L	T	W		L		T
No. 3 Randolph Field		–		11	–	0	–	0
No. 5 Bainbridge		–		10	–	0	–	0
No. 18 Fort Pierce		–		9	–	0	–	0
No. T–13 Norman NAS		–		6	–	0	–	0
No. 6 Iowa Pre-Flight		–		10	–	1	–	0
No. 16 El Toro Marines		–		8	–	1	–	0
Hondo AAF		–		7	–	1	–	0
Bunker Hill NAS		–		6	–	1	–	0
Lincoln AAF		–		6	–	1	–	0
Blackland AAF		–		7	–	1	–	1
Keesler Field		–		8	–	1	–	2
No. 17 Great Lakes Navy		–		9	–	2	–	1
No. 10 March Field		–		7	–	2	–	2
Third Air Force		–		8	–	3	–	0
North Carolina Pre-Flight		–		6	–	2	–	1
Atlantic City NAS		–		5	–	2	–	0
Camp Peary		–		5	–	2	–	0
Tonopah AAF		–		5	–	2	–	0
Daniel Field		–		7	–	3	–	0
No. 20 Second Air Force		–		10	–	4	–	1
San Francisco Coast Guard		–		4	–	2	–	1
Ellington Field		–		6	–	3	–	2
Amarillo AAF		–		5	–	3	–	0
Alameda Coast Guard		–		4	–	2	–	2
Coronado Amphibious		–		2	–	1	–	1
Olathe NAS		–		4	–	2	–	2
Selman Field		–		4	–	2	–	2
Galveston AAF		–		5	–	3	–	2
Fleet City		–		6	–	4	–	1
Jacksonville NAS		–		4	–	3	–	0
San Diego NTS		–		4	–	3	–	1
Camp Beale		–		5	–	4	–	0
Lubbock AAF		–		5	–	4	–	0
Fort Warren		–		5	–	4	–	1
Fort Monroe		–		5	–	5	–	0
Klamath Falls Marines		–		2	–	2	–	1
Maxwell Field		–		5	–	5	–	0
Minter Field		–		3	–	3	–	0
No. 19 Saint Mary's Pre-Flight		–		4	–	4	–	0
Fourth Infantry		–		3	–	4	–	2
Georgia Pre-Flight		–		4	–	5	–	0
Third Infantry		–		4	–	5	–	0
Melville PT Boats		–		3	–	0	–	0
Bergstrom Field		–		3	–	4	–	0
Ottumwa NAS		–		3	–	4	–	0
Camp Lee		–		3	–	5	–	0
Cherry Point Marines		–		3	–	6	–	0
Chatham Field		–		2	–	8	–	1
Sampton NTS		–		2	–	7	–	0
Miami NTC		–		2	–	8	–	0
Bryan AAF		–		1	–	7	–	0
Fairfield-Suisun AAB		–		1	–	7	–	0
Richmond AAB		–		0	–	10	–	1
Camp Ellis		–		0	–	5	–	0
South Plains AAF		–		0	–	8	–	0
Rankings from AP Poll

The Tonopah Army Air Field Indians represented the United States Army Air Forces' Tonopah Army Air Field (Tonopah AAF), located near Tonopah, Nevada, during the 1944 college football season. Led by head coach George Solari, the Indians compiled a record of 5–2.

In the final Litkenhous Ratings, Tonopah AAF ranked 143rd among the nation's college and service teams and 25th out of 63 United States Army teams with a rating of 58.9.

== Schedule ==
Date	Time	Opponent	Site	Result	Attendance	Source
September 24	2:00 p.m.	Nevada	Sagebrush Bowl; Nye County, NV	L 0–20	300	
September 30		Arizona State–Flagstaff	Skidmore Field; Flagstaff, AZ	L 0–13		
October 14	2:15 p.m.	at Nevada	Mackay Stadium; Reno, NV	W 7–6		
October 22		Compton	Nye County, NV	W 40–9	3,000	
October 30		at Fairfield-Suisun AAB	Corbus Field; Vallejo, CA	W 20–7		
November 5		Fairfield-Suisun AAB	Sagebrush Bowl; Nye County, NV	W 9–0	2,000	
November 18	8:00 p.m.	at Fresno State	Ratcliffe Stadium; Fresno, CA	W 7–6	1,500	
All times are in Pacific time
