= 1944 Fort Monroe Gunners football team =

American college football season

1944 Fort Monroe Gunners football
- Conference: Independent
- Record: 5–5
- Head coach: Joe Murray (1st season)
- Home stadium: Fort Monroe parade ground, Darlington Memorial Park

1944 military service football records
	Conf.			Overall
Team	W	L	T	W		L		T
No. 3 Randolph Field		–		11	–	0	–	0
No. 5 Bainbridge		–		10	–	0	–	0
No. 18 Fort Pierce		–		9	–	0	–	0
No. T–13 Norman NAS		–		6	–	0	–	0
No. 6 Iowa Pre-Flight		–		10	–	1	–	0
No. 16 El Toro Marines		–		8	–	1	–	0
Hondo AAF		–		7	–	1	–	0
Bunker Hill NAS		–		6	–	1	–	0
Lincoln AAF		–		6	–	1	–	0
Blackland AAF		–		7	–	1	–	1
Keesler Field		–		8	–	1	–	2
No. 17 Great Lakes Navy		–		9	–	2	–	1
No. 10 March Field		–		7	–	2	–	2
Third Air Force		–		8	–	3	–	0
North Carolina Pre-Flight		–		6	–	2	–	1
Atlantic City NAS		–		5	–	2	–	0
Camp Peary		–		5	–	2	–	0
Tonopah AAF		–		5	–	2	–	0
Daniel Field		–		7	–	3	–	0
No. 20 Second Air Force		–		10	–	4	–	1
San Francisco Coast Guard		–		4	–	2	–	1
Ellington Field		–		6	–	3	–	2
Amarillo AAF		–		5	–	3	–	0
Alameda Coast Guard		–		4	–	2	–	2
Coronado Amphibious		–		2	–	1	–	1
Olathe NAS		–		4	–	2	–	2
Selman Field		–		4	–	2	–	2
Galveston AAF		–		5	–	3	–	2
Fleet City		–		6	–	4	–	1
Jacksonville NAS		–		4	–	3	–	0
San Diego NTS		–		4	–	3	–	1
Camp Beale		–		5	–	4	–	0
Lubbock AAF		–		5	–	4	–	0
Fort Warren		–		5	–	4	–	1
Fort Monroe		–		5	–	5	–	0
Klamath Falls Marines		–		2	–	2	–	1
Maxwell Field		–		5	–	5	–	0
Minter Field		–		3	–	3	–	0
No. 19 Saint Mary's Pre-Flight		–		4	–	4	–	0
Fourth Infantry		–		3	–	4	–	2
Georgia Pre-Flight		–		4	–	5	–	0
Third Infantry		–		4	–	5	–	0
Melville PT Boats		–		3	–	0	–	0
Bergstrom Field		–		3	–	4	–	0
Ottumwa NAS		–		3	–	4	–	0
Camp Lee		–		3	–	5	–	0
Cherry Point Marines		–		3	–	6	–	0
Chatham Field		–		2	–	8	–	1
Sampton NTS		–		2	–	7	–	0
Miami NTC		–		2	–	8	–	0
Bryan AAF		–		1	–	7	–	0
Fairfield-Suisun AAB		–		1	–	7	–	0
Richmond AAB		–		0	–	10	–	1
Camp Ellis		–		0	–	5	–	0
South Plains AAF		–		0	–	8	–	0
Rankings from AP Poll

The 1944 Fort Monroe Gunners football team represented the United States Army's Fort Monroe in Hampton, Virginia during the 1944 college football season. Led by head coach Joe Murray, the Gunners compiled a record of 5–5. Captain Nelson T. Turner was an assistant coach for the team.

In the final Litkenhous Ratings, Fort Monroe ranked 238th among the nation's college and service teams and 49th out of 63 United States Army teams with a rating of 35.2.

== Schedule ==
Date	Time	Opponent	Site	Result	Attendance	Source
September 24		at Richmond AAB	Base gridiron; Richmond, VA	W 7–6		
September 30	2:30 p.m.	at William & Mary	Cary Field; Williamsburg, VA	L 0–46	1,800	
October 7	2:30 p.m.	Richmond AAB	Hampton, VA	W 13–0		
October 15	2:30 p.m.	Portsmouth Fleet	Fort Monroe parade ground; Hampton, VA	L 6–7	2,500	
October 22		at Camp Lee	Petersburg, VA	cancelled		
October 28	2:30 p.m.	Catawba	Darlington Memorial Park; Hampton, VA	L 0–26		
November 5	2:30 p.m.	Indiantown Gap	Fort Monroe parade ground; Hampton, VA	W 26–6		
November 12	2:30 p.m.	at Camp Lejeune	Camp Lejeune, NC	L 0–26		
November 19	2:00 p.m.	at Camp Lee	Camp Lee, VA	L 13–26	1,250	
December 2	3:00 p.m.	vs. Camp Detrick	Bowman Gray Stadium; Winston-Salem, NC	W 19–6		
December 10		at Camp Detrick	Frederick, MA	W 13–12		
All times are in Eastern time
