= 1944 Selman Field Cyclones football team =

American college football season

1944 Selman Field Cyclones football
- Conference: Independent
- Record: 4–2–2
- Head coach: Clyde Funderburk (1st season)
- Home stadium: Brown Stadium

1944 military service football records
	Conf.			Overall
Team	W	L	T	W		L		T
No. 3 Randolph Field		–		11	–	0	–	0
No. 5 Bainbridge		–		10	–	0	–	0
No. 18 Fort Pierce		–		9	–	0	–	0
No. T–13 Norman NAS		–		6	–	0	–	0
No. 6 Iowa Pre-Flight		–		10	–	1	–	0
No. 16 El Toro Marines		–		8	–	1	–	0
Hondo AAF		–		7	–	1	–	0
Bunker Hill NAS		–		6	–	1	–	0
Lincoln AAF		–		6	–	1	–	0
Blackland AAF		–		7	–	1	–	1
Keesler Field		–		8	–	1	–	2
No. 17 Great Lakes Navy		–		9	–	2	–	1
No. 10 March Field		–		7	–	2	–	2
Third Air Force		–		8	–	3	–	0
North Carolina Pre-Flight		–		6	–	2	–	1
Atlantic City NAS		–		5	–	2	–	0
Camp Peary		–		5	–	2	–	0
Tonopah AAF		–		5	–	2	–	0
Daniel Field		–		7	–	3	–	0
No. 20 Second Air Force		–		10	–	4	–	1
San Francisco Coast Guard		–		4	–	2	–	1
Ellington Field		–		6	–	3	–	2
Amarillo AAF		–		5	–	3	–	0
Alameda Coast Guard		–		4	–	2	–	2
Coronado Amphibious		–		2	–	1	–	1
Olathe NAS		–		4	–	2	–	2
Selman Field		–		4	–	2	–	2
Galveston AAF		–		5	–	3	–	2
Fleet City		–		6	–	4	–	1
Jacksonville NAS		–		4	–	3	–	0
San Diego NTS		–		4	–	3	–	1
Camp Beale		–		5	–	4	–	0
Lubbock AAF		–		5	–	4	–	0
Fort Warren		–		5	–	4	–	1
Fort Monroe		–		5	–	5	–	0
Klamath Falls Marines		–		2	–	2	–	1
Maxwell Field		–		5	–	5	–	0
Minter Field		–		3	–	3	–	0
No. 19 Saint Mary's Pre-Flight		–		4	–	4	–	0
Fourth Infantry		–		3	–	4	–	2
Georgia Pre-Flight		–		4	–	5	–	0
Third Infantry		–		4	–	5	–	0
Melville PT Boats		–		3	–	0	–	0
Bergstrom Field		–		3	–	4	–	0
Ottumwa NAS		–		3	–	4	–	0
Camp Lee		–		3	–	5	–	0
Cherry Point Marines		–		3	–	6	–	0
Chatham Field		–		2	–	8	–	1
Sampton NTS		–		2	–	7	–	0
Miami NTC		–		2	–	8	–	0
Bryan AAF		–		1	–	7	–	0
Fairfield-Suisun AAB		–		1	–	7	–	0
Richmond AAB		–		0	–	10	–	1
Camp Ellis		–		0	–	5	–	0
South Plains AAF		–		0	–	8	–	0
Rankings from AP Poll

The 1944 Selman Field Cyclones football team represented the United States Army Air Force's Selman Army Airfield near Monroe, Louisiana during the 1944 college football season. Led by head coach Clyde Funderburk, the Cyclones compiled a record of 4–2–2. Lieutenant Edward Schumacher was an assistant coach for the team.

In the final Litkenhous Ratings, Keesler Field ranked 118th among the nation's college and service teams and 21st out of 63 United States Army teams with a rating of 67.7.

== Schedule ==
Date	Time	Opponent	Site	Result	Attendance	Source
September 23	2:15 p.m.	Arkansas A&M	Brown Stadium; Monroe, LA	L 0–20	6,000	
September 30		at Louisiana Tech	Tech Stadium; Ruston, LA	W 13–6		
October 7		at Louisiana Normal	Demon Stadium; Natchitoches, LA	W 20–7		
October 14	8:15 p.m.	Keesler Field	Brown Stadium; Monroe, LA	T 19–19	6,000	
October 21		Galveston AAF	Brown Stadium; Monroe, LA	T 0–0		
November 5	2:30 p.m.	at Keesler Field	Biloxi, MS	L 0–20	10,000	
November 11		Algiers NS	Brown Stadium; Monroe, LA	W 13–6		
November 18	8:15 p.m.	Louisiana Normal	Brown Stadium; Monroe, LA	cancelled		
November 25		at Galveston AAF	Galveston, TX	W 20–14		
All times are in Central time
