= 1944 Blackland Army Air Field Eagles football team =

American college football season

1944 Blackland Army Air Field Eagles football
- Conference: Independent
- Record: 7–1–1
- Head coach: Edward C. Wilds
- Home stadium: Municipal Stadium, Waco High School stadium

1944 military service football records
	Conf.			Overall
Team	W	L	T	W		L		T
No. 3 Randolph Field		–		11	–	0	–	0
No. 5 Bainbridge		–		10	–	0	–	0
No. 18 Fort Pierce		–		9	–	0	–	0
No. T–13 Norman NAS		–		6	–	0	–	0
No. 6 Iowa Pre-Flight		–		10	–	1	–	0
No. 16 El Toro Marines		–		8	–	1	–	0
Hondo AAF		–		7	–	1	–	0
Bunker Hill NAS		–		6	–	1	–	0
Lincoln AAF		–		6	–	1	–	0
Blackland AAF		–		7	–	1	–	1
Keesler Field		–		8	–	1	–	2
No. 17 Great Lakes Navy		–		9	–	2	–	1
No. 10 March Field		–		7	–	2	–	2
Third Air Force		–		8	–	3	–	0
North Carolina Pre-Flight		–		6	–	2	–	1
Atlantic City NAS		–		5	–	2	–	0
Camp Peary		–		5	–	2	–	0
Tonopah AAF		–		5	–	2	–	0
Daniel Field		–		7	–	3	–	0
No. 20 Second Air Force		–		10	–	4	–	1
San Francisco Coast Guard		–		4	–	2	–	1
Ellington Field		–		6	–	3	–	2
Amarillo AAF		–		5	–	3	–	0
Alameda Coast Guard		–		4	–	2	–	2
Coronado Amphibious		–		2	–	1	–	1
Olathe NAS		–		4	–	2	–	2
Selman Field		–		4	–	2	–	2
Galveston AAF		–		5	–	3	–	2
Fleet City		–		6	–	4	–	1
Jacksonville NAS		–		4	–	3	–	0
San Diego NTS		–		4	–	3	–	1
Camp Beale		–		5	–	4	–	0
Lubbock AAF		–		5	–	4	–	0
Fort Warren		–		5	–	4	–	1
Fort Monroe		–		5	–	5	–	0
Klamath Falls Marines		–		2	–	2	–	1
Maxwell Field		–		5	–	5	–	0
Minter Field		–		3	–	3	–	0
No. 19 Saint Mary's Pre-Flight		–		4	–	4	–	0
Fourth Infantry		–		3	–	4	–	2
Georgia Pre-Flight		–		4	–	5	–	0
Third Infantry		–		4	–	5	–	0
Melville PT Boats		–		3	–	0	–	0
Bergstrom Field		–		3	–	4	–	0
Ottumwa NAS		–		3	–	4	–	0
Camp Lee		–		3	–	5	–	0
Cherry Point Marines		–		3	–	6	–	0
Chatham Field		–		2	–	8	–	1
Sampton NTS		–		2	–	7	–	0
Miami NTC		–		2	–	8	–	0
Bryan AAF		–		1	–	7	–	0
Fairfield-Suisun AAB		–		1	–	7	–	0
Richmond AAB		–		0	–	10	–	1
Camp Ellis		–		0	–	5	–	0
South Plains AAF		–		0	–	8	–	0
Rankings from AP Poll

The 1944 Blackland Army Air Field Eagles football team represented the United States Army Air Force's Blackland Army Air Field (Blackland AAF or BAAF), located near Waco, Texas, during the 1944 college football season. Led by head coach Edward C. Wilds, the Eagles compiled a record of 7–1–1.

In the final Litkenhous Ratings, Blackland AAF ranked 104th among the nation's college and service teams and 17th out of 63 United States Army teams with a rating of 70.1.

== Schedule ==
Date	Time	Opponent	Site	Result	Attendance	Source
September 23		John Tarleton	Waco, TX	W 24–0		
September 30		at Bryan AAF	Bryan, TX	W 27–0		
October 7	8:00 p.m.	at Bergstrom Field	House Park; Austin, TX	L 12–19	4,000	
October 14		Ellington Field	Waco, TX	W 19–0		
October 28		Bryan AAF	Municipal Stadium; Waco, TX	W 41–0		
November 3		at Ellington Field	Houston, TX	T 0–0		
November 11	8:00 p.m.	Bergstrom Field	Waco High School stadium; Waco, TX	W 7–0		
November 18	8:00 p.m.	at Eagle Mountain Marines	Eagle Field; Denton, TX	W 24–0		
November 24	7:30 p.m.	at John Tarleton	Waco, TX	W 27–0		
All times are in Central time
