= 1944 Chatham Field Blockbusters football team =

College football season

1944 Chatham Field Blockbusters football
- Conference: Independent
- Record: 2–8–1
- Head coach: Art White (1st season)

1944 military service football records
| | Conf. | | | Overall |
| Team | W | L | T | W | | L | | T |
|---|---|---|---|---|---|---|---|---|
| No. 3 Randolph Field | | – | | 11 | – | 0 | – | 0 |
| No. 5 Bainbridge | | – | | 10 | – | 0 | – | 0 |
| No. 18 Fort Pierce | | – | | 9 | – | 0 | – | 0 |
| No. T–13 Norman NAS | | – | | 6 | – | 0 | – | 0 |
| No. 6 Iowa Pre-Flight | | – | | 10 | – | 1 | – | 0 |
| No. 16 El Toro Marines | | – | | 8 | – | 1 | – | 0 |
| Hondo AAF | | – | | 7 | – | 1 | – | 0 |
| Bunker Hill NAS | | – | | 6 | – | 1 | – | 0 |
| Lincoln AAF | | – | | 6 | – | 1 | – | 0 |
| Blackland AAF | | – | | 7 | – | 1 | – | 1 |
| Keesler Field | | – | | 8 | – | 1 | – | 2 |
| No. 17 Great Lakes Navy | | – | | 9 | – | 2 | – | 1 |
| No. 10 March Field | | – | | 7 | – | 2 | – | 2 |
| Third Air Force | | – | | 8 | – | 3 | – | 0 |
| North Carolina Pre-Flight | | – | | 6 | – | 2 | – | 1 |
| Atlantic City NAS | | – | | 5 | – | 2 | – | 0 |
| Camp Peary | | – | | 5 | – | 2 | – | 0 |
| Tonopah AAF | | – | | 5 | – | 2 | – | 0 |
| Daniel Field | | – | | 7 | – | 3 | – | 0 |
| No. 20 Second Air Force | | – | | 10 | – | 4 | – | 1 |
| San Francisco Coast Guard | | – | | 4 | – | 2 | – | 1 |
| Ellington Field | | – | | 6 | – | 3 | – | 2 |
| Amarillo AAF | | – | | 5 | – | 3 | – | 0 |
| Alameda Coast Guard | | – | | 4 | – | 2 | – | 2 |
| Coronado Amphibious | | – | | 2 | – | 1 | – | 1 |
| Olathe NAS | | – | | 4 | – | 2 | – | 2 |
| Selman Field | | – | | 4 | – | 2 | – | 2 |
| Galveston AAF | | – | | 5 | – | 3 | – | 2 |
| Fleet City | | – | | 6 | – | 4 | – | 1 |
| Jacksonville NAS | | – | | 4 | – | 3 | – | 0 |
| San Diego NTS | | – | | 4 | – | 3 | – | 1 |
| Camp Beale | | – | | 5 | – | 4 | – | 0 |
| Lubbock AAF | | – | | 5 | – | 4 | – | 0 |
| Fort Warren | | – | | 5 | – | 4 | – | 1 |
| Fort Monroe | | – | | 5 | – | 5 | – | 0 |
| Klamath Falls Marines | | – | | 2 | – | 2 | – | 1 |
| Maxwell Field | | – | | 5 | – | 5 | – | 0 |
| Minter Field | | – | | 3 | – | 3 | – | 0 |
| No. 19 Saint Mary's Pre-Flight | | – | | 4 | – | 4 | – | 0 |
| Fourth Infantry | | – | | 3 | – | 4 | – | 2 |
| Georgia Pre-Flight | | – | | 4 | – | 5 | – | 0 |
| Third Infantry | | – | | 4 | – | 5 | – | 0 |
| Melville PT Boats | | – | | 3 | – | 0 | – | 0 |
| Bergstrom Field | | – | | 3 | – | 4 | – | 0 |
| Ottumwa NAS | | – | | 3 | – | 4 | – | 0 |
| Camp Lee | | – | | 3 | – | 5 | – | 0 |
| Cherry Point Marines | | – | | 3 | – | 6 | – | 0 |
| Chatham Field | | – | | 2 | – | 8 | – | 1 |
| Sampton NTS | | – | | 2 | – | 7 | – | 0 |
| Miami NTC | | – | | 2 | – | 8 | – | 0 |
| Bryan AAF | | – | | 1 | – | 7 | – | 0 |
| Fairfield-Suisun AAB | | – | | 1 | – | 7 | – | 0 |
| Richmond AAB | | – | | 0 | – | 10 | – | 1 |
| Camp Ellis | | – | | 0 | – | 5 | – | 0 |
| South Plains AAF | | – | | 0 | – | 8 | – | 0 |
Rankings from AP Poll

The 1944 Chatham Field Blockbusters football team, sometimes called the "Fliers", represented the United States Army Air Forces' Chatham Field, located in Savannah, Georgia, during the 1944 college football season. Led by head coach Art White, the Blockbusters compiled a record of 2–8–1.

In the final Litkenhous Ratings, Chatham Field ranked 208th among the nation's college and service teams and 40th out of 63 United States Army teams with a rating of 44.8.

== Schedule ==
| Date | Time | Opponent | Site | Result | Attendance | Source |
|---|---|---|---|---|---|---|
| September 16 | 3:00 p.m. | at Newberry | Newberry, SC | W 12–7 | | |
| September 28 | 8:00 p.m. | at Fourth Infantry | Doughboy Stadium; Fort Benning, GA | T 0–0 | 12,000 | |
| October 1 | | Third Air Force | Savannah, GA | L 0–45 | 9,000 | |
| October 8 | | at Charleston Coast Guard | Johnson Hagood Stadium; Charleston, SC | L 0–14 | | |
| October 14 | | at Fort Pierce | Fort Pierce, FL | L 0–74 | | |
| October 22 | | at Maxwell Field | Cramton Bowl; Montgomery, AL | L 0–40 | | |
| October 28 | 2:00 p.m. | at Pittsburgh | Pitt Stadium; Pittsburgh, PA | L 0–26 | 8,000 | |
| November 4 | | TCU | Savannah, GA | L 7–19 | 6,000 | |
| November 18 | | at Cherry Point Marines | Cherry Point, NC | L 0–35 | | |
| November 26 | | University of Havana | Savannah, GA | W 25–7 | | |
| December 3 | | Mayport NAS | Savannah, GA | L 0–26 | | |
All times are in Eastern time
