= 1944 South Plains Army Air Field Winged Commandoes football team =

American college football season

1944 South Plains Army Air Field Winged Commandoes football
- Conference: Independent
- Record: 0–8
- Head coach: Ray Cagni (1st season)
- Home stadium: Tech Field

1944 military service football records
	Conf.			Overall
Team	W	L	T	W		L		T
No. 3 Randolph Field		–		11	–	0	–	0
No. 5 Bainbridge		–		10	–	0	–	0
No. 18 Fort Pierce		–		9	–	0	–	0
No. T–13 Norman NAS		–		6	–	0	–	0
No. 6 Iowa Pre-Flight		–		10	–	1	–	0
No. 16 El Toro Marines		–		8	–	1	–	0
Hondo AAF		–		7	–	1	–	0
Bunker Hill NAS		–		6	–	1	–	0
Lincoln AAF		–		6	–	1	–	0
Blackland AAF		–		7	–	1	–	1
Keesler Field		–		8	–	1	–	2
No. 17 Great Lakes Navy		–		9	–	2	–	1
No. 10 March Field		–		7	–	2	–	2
Third Air Force		–		8	–	3	–	0
North Carolina Pre-Flight		–		6	–	2	–	1
Atlantic City NAS		–		5	–	2	–	0
Camp Peary		–		5	–	2	–	0
Tonopah AAF		–		5	–	2	–	0
Daniel Field		–		7	–	3	–	0
No. 20 Second Air Force		–		10	–	4	–	1
San Francisco Coast Guard		–		4	–	2	–	1
Ellington Field		–		6	–	3	–	2
Amarillo AAF		–		5	–	3	–	0
Alameda Coast Guard		–		4	–	2	–	2
Coronado Amphibious		–		2	–	1	–	1
Olathe NAS		–		4	–	2	–	2
Selman Field		–		4	–	2	–	2
Galveston AAF		–		5	–	3	–	2
Fleet City		–		6	–	4	–	1
Jacksonville NAS		–		4	–	3	–	0
San Diego NTS		–		4	–	3	–	1
Camp Beale		–		5	–	4	–	0
Lubbock AAF		–		5	–	4	–	0
Fort Warren		–		5	–	4	–	1
Fort Monroe		–		5	–	5	–	0
Klamath Falls Marines		–		2	–	2	–	1
Maxwell Field		–		5	–	5	–	0
Minter Field		–		3	–	3	–	0
No. 19 Saint Mary's Pre-Flight		–		4	–	4	–	0
Fourth Infantry		–		3	–	4	–	2
Georgia Pre-Flight		–		4	–	5	–	0
Third Infantry		–		4	–	5	–	0
Melville PT Boats		–		3	–	0	–	0
Bergstrom Field		–		3	–	4	–	0
Ottumwa NAS		–		3	–	4	–	0
Camp Lee		–		3	–	5	–	0
Cherry Point Marines		–		3	–	6	–	0
Chatham Field		–		2	–	8	–	1
Sampton NTS		–		2	–	7	–	0
Miami NTC		–		2	–	8	–	0
Bryan AAF		–		1	–	7	–	0
Fairfield-Suisun AAB		–		1	–	7	–	0
Richmond AAB		–		0	–	10	–	1
Camp Ellis		–		0	–	5	–	0
South Plains AAF		–		0	–	8	–	0
Rankings from AP Poll

The 1944 South Plains Army Air Field Winged Commandoes football team represented the United States Army Air Forces's South Plains Army Air Field (South Plains AAF or SPAAF), located near Lubbock, Texas, during the 1944 college football season. Led by first-year head coach Ray Cagni, the Winged Commandoes compiled a record of 0–8. Ray Truitt was the team's line coach and also started at guard.

In the final Litkenhous Ratings, South Plains AAF ranked 165th among the nation's college and service teams and 34th out of 63 United States Army teams with a rating of 54.6.

== Schedule ==
Date	Time	Opponent	Site	Result	Attendance	Source
September 24		Amarillo AAF	Tech Field; Lubbock, TX	cancelled		
September 30	4:00 p.m.	at TCU	Amon G. Carter Stadium; Fort Worth, TX	L 34–0	4,000	
October 6		at North Texas Aggies	Arlington, TX	L 0–15		
October 22	2:30 p.m.	vs. Lubbock AAF	Tech Field; Lubbock, TX (Khaki Classic)	L 14–46	4,000	
October 28	8:00 p.m.	at Amarillo AAF	Butler Field; Amarillo, TX	L 13–53		
November 3		at Southwestern (TX)	Georgetown, TX	L 6–21		
November 11		Fort Bliss	Tech Field; Lubbock, TX	L 20–49		
November 17		West Texas State	Tech Field; Lubbock, TX	L 14–19	150	
November 26		UNAM	Tech Field; Lubbock, TX	cancelled		
December 2	2:00 p.m.	at Texas Tech	Tech Field; Lubbock, TX	L 6–7		
All times are in Central time
