= 1944 Cherry Point Marines Flying Leathernecks football team =

American college football season

1944 Cherry Point Marines Flying Leathernecks football
- Conference: Independent
- Record: 3–6
- Head coach: Clipper Smith (1st season)

1944 military service football records
	Conf.			Overall
Team	W	L	T	W		L		T
No. 3 Randolph Field		–		11	–	0	–	0
No. 5 Bainbridge		–		10	–	0	–	0
No. 18 Fort Pierce		–		9	–	0	–	0
No. T–13 Norman NAS		–		6	–	0	–	0
No. 6 Iowa Pre-Flight		–		10	–	1	–	0
No. 16 El Toro Marines		–		8	–	1	–	0
Hondo AAF		–		7	–	1	–	0
Bunker Hill NAS		–		6	–	1	–	0
Lincoln AAF		–		6	–	1	–	0
Blackland AAF		–		7	–	1	–	1
Keesler Field		–		8	–	1	–	2
No. 17 Great Lakes Navy		–		9	–	2	–	1
No. 10 March Field		–		7	–	2	–	2
Third Air Force		–		8	–	3	–	0
North Carolina Pre-Flight		–		6	–	2	–	1
Atlantic City NAS		–		5	–	2	–	0
Camp Peary		–		5	–	2	–	0
Tonopah AAF		–		5	–	2	–	0
Daniel Field		–		7	–	3	–	0
No. 20 Second Air Force		–		10	–	4	–	1
San Francisco Coast Guard		–		4	–	2	–	1
Ellington Field		–		6	–	3	–	2
Amarillo AAF		–		5	–	3	–	0
Alameda Coast Guard		–		4	–	2	–	2
Coronado Amphibious		–		2	–	1	–	1
Olathe NAS		–		4	–	2	–	2
Selman Field		–		4	–	2	–	2
Galveston AAF		–		5	–	3	–	2
Fleet City		–		6	–	4	–	1
Jacksonville NAS		–		4	–	3	–	0
San Diego NTS		–		4	–	3	–	1
Camp Beale		–		5	–	4	–	0
Lubbock AAF		–		5	–	4	–	0
Fort Warren		–		5	–	4	–	1
Fort Monroe		–		5	–	5	–	0
Klamath Falls Marines		–		2	–	2	–	1
Maxwell Field		–		5	–	5	–	0
Minter Field		–		3	–	3	–	0
No. 19 Saint Mary's Pre-Flight		–		4	–	4	–	0
Fourth Infantry		–		3	–	4	–	2
Georgia Pre-Flight		–		4	–	5	–	0
Third Infantry		–		4	–	5	–	0
Melville PT Boats		–		3	–	0	–	0
Bergstrom Field		–		3	–	4	–	0
Ottumwa NAS		–		3	–	4	–	0
Camp Lee		–		3	–	5	–	0
Cherry Point Marines		–		3	–	6	–	0
Chatham Field		–		2	–	8	–	1
Sampton NTS		–		2	–	7	–	0
Miami NTC		–		2	–	8	–	0
Bryan AAF		–		1	–	7	–	0
Fairfield-Suisun AAB		–		1	–	7	–	0
Richmond AAB		–		0	–	10	–	1
Camp Ellis		–		0	–	5	–	0
South Plains AAF		–		0	–	8	–	0
Rankings from AP Poll

The 1944 Cherry Point Marines Flying Leathernecks football team represented Marine Corps Air Station Cherry Point in North Carolina during the 1944 college football season. Led by head coach Clipper Smith, the Flying Leathernecks compiled a record of 3–6.

In the final Litkenhous Ratings, Cherry Point Marines ranked 116th among the nation's college and service teams and second out of six United States Marine Corps teams with a rating of 67.8.

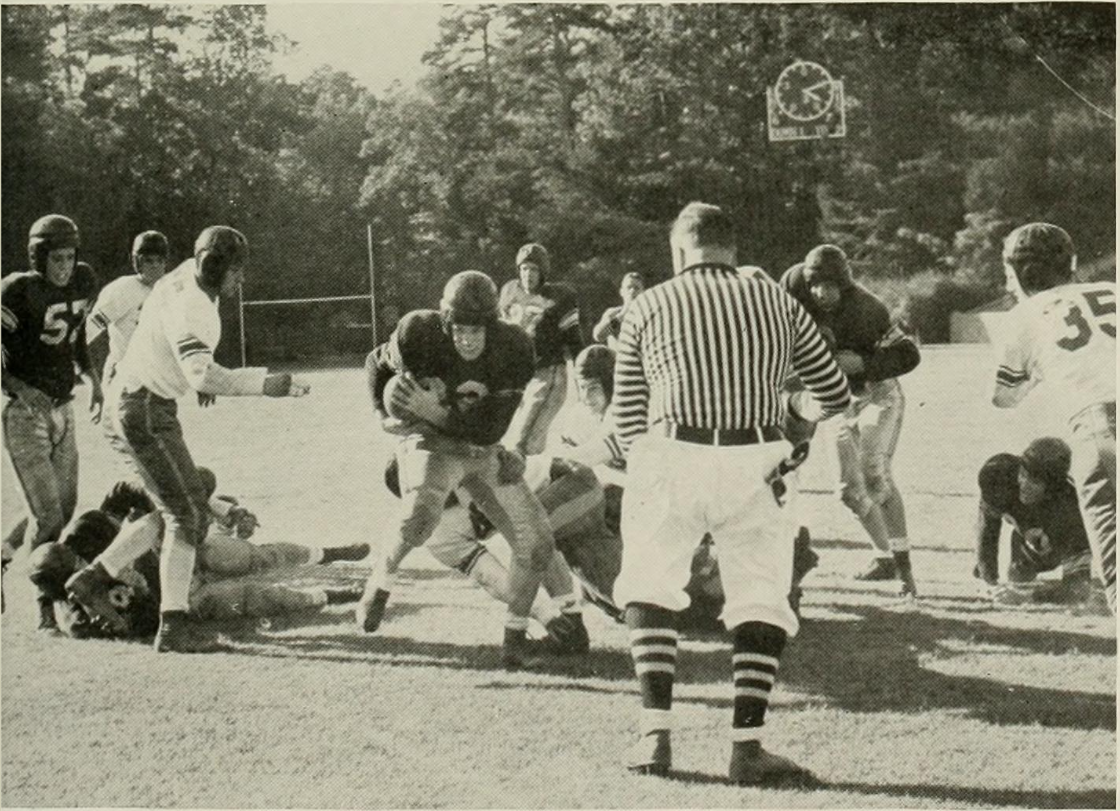
The Flying Leathernecks during their game against North Carolina

== Schedule ==
Date	Time	Opponent	Site	Result	Attendance	Source
September 24	2:30 p.m.	at North Carolina Pre-Flight	Kenan Memorial Stadium; Chapel Hill, NC	L 14–27	8,000	
September 30	3:00 p.m.	Camp Peary	Cherry Point, NC	L 0–20		
October 8		at Georgia Pre-Flight	Sanford Stadium; Athens, GA	L 0–33		
October 14	3:00 p.m.	at North Carolina	Kenan Memorial Stadium; Chapel Hill, NC	L 14–20	7,500	
October 22		at Third Air Force	Charlotte, NC	L 7–29		
October 29		Camp Lee	Cherry Point, NC	W 6–0	10,000	
November 4	4:00 p.m.	at Jacksonville NAS	Mason Field; Jacksonville, FL	L 0–33	6,000	
November 11		at Bainbridge	Tome Field; Bainbridge, MD	L 7–50		
November 18		Chatham Field	Cherry Point, NC	W 35–0		
November 26	2:00 p.m.	at Camp Lee	Camp Lee, VA	W 13–0	12,000	
All times are in Eastern time
