= 1944 San Diego Naval Training Station Bluejackets football team =

American college football season

1944 San Diego Naval Training Station Bluejackets football
- Conference: Independent
- Record: 4–3–1
- Head coach: Skip Stahley (1st season)
- Home stadium: Hull Field

1944 military service football records
	Conf.			Overall
Team	W	L	T	W		L		T
No. 3 Randolph Field		–		11	–	0	–	0
No. 5 Bainbridge		–		10	–	0	–	0
No. 18 Fort Pierce		–		9	–	0	–	0
No. T–13 Norman NAS		–		6	–	0	–	0
No. 6 Iowa Pre-Flight		–		10	–	1	–	0
No. 16 El Toro Marines		–		8	–	1	–	0
Hondo AAF		–		7	–	1	–	0
Bunker Hill NAS		–		6	–	1	–	0
Lincoln AAF		–		6	–	1	–	0
Blackland AAF		–		7	–	1	–	1
Keesler Field		–		8	–	1	–	2
No. 17 Great Lakes Navy		–		9	–	2	–	1
No. 10 March Field		–		7	–	2	–	2
Third Air Force		–		8	–	3	–	0
North Carolina Pre-Flight		–		6	–	2	–	1
Atlantic City NAS		–		5	–	2	–	0
Camp Peary		–		5	–	2	–	0
Tonopah AAF		–		5	–	2	–	0
Daniel Field		–		7	–	3	–	0
No. 20 Second Air Force		–		10	–	4	–	1
San Francisco Coast Guard		–		4	–	2	–	1
Ellington Field		–		6	–	3	–	2
Amarillo AAF		–		5	–	3	–	0
Alameda Coast Guard		–		4	–	2	–	2
Coronado Amphibious		–		2	–	1	–	1
Olathe NAS		–		4	–	2	–	2
Selman Field		–		4	–	2	–	2
Galveston AAF		–		5	–	3	–	2
Fleet City		–		6	–	4	–	1
Jacksonville NAS		–		4	–	3	–	0
San Diego NTS		–		4	–	3	–	1
Camp Beale		–		5	–	4	–	0
Lubbock AAF		–		5	–	4	–	0
Fort Warren		–		5	–	4	–	1
Fort Monroe		–		5	–	5	–	0
Klamath Falls Marines		–		2	–	2	–	1
Maxwell Field		–		5	–	5	–	0
Minter Field		–		3	–	3	–	0
No. 19 Saint Mary's Pre-Flight		–		4	–	4	–	0
Fourth Infantry		–		3	–	4	–	2
Georgia Pre-Flight		–		4	–	5	–	0
Third Infantry		–		4	–	5	–	0
Melville PT Boats		–		3	–	0	–	0
Bergstrom Field		–		3	–	4	–	0
Ottumwa NAS		–		3	–	4	–	0
Camp Lee		–		3	–	5	–	0
Cherry Point Marines		–		3	–	6	–	0
Chatham Field		–		2	–	8	–	1
Sampton NTS		–		2	–	7	–	0
Miami NTC		–		2	–	8	–	0
Bryan AAF		–		1	–	7	–	0
Fairfield-Suisun AAB		–		1	–	7	–	0
Richmond AAB		–		0	–	10	–	1
Camp Ellis		–		0	–	5	–	0
South Plains AAF		–		0	–	8	–	0
Rankings from AP Poll

The 1944 San Diego Naval Training Station Bluejackets football team was an American football team that represented San Diego Naval Training Station (San Diego NTS) during the 1944 college football season. The team was coached by Skip Stahley, former head coach at Brown, and played its home games on Hull Field in San Diego. The Bluejackets compiled a 4–3–1 record.

Key players included quarterback Clyde LeForce, formerly of Tulsa and later with the Detroit Lions, and end John Stonebraker, formerly of USC and the Green Bay Packers.

In the final Litkenhous Ratings, San Diego NTS ranked 49th among the nation's college and service teams and tenth out of 28 United States Marine Corps teams with a rating of 88.3.

== Schedule ==
Date	Opponent	Site	Result	Attendance	Source
September 23	1005th Army Engineers (Wilmington)	Hull Field; San Diego, CA	W 65–0		
October 1	Compton	Hull Field; San Diego, CA	W 85–0		
October 7	UCLA	Hull Field; San Diego, CA	W 14–12	5,000	
October 15	El Toro Marines	Hull Field; San Diego, CA	L 0–6		
October 22	Fort MacArthur	Hull Field; San Diego, CA	W 69–0		
October 29	Coronado Amphibious Training Center	Hull Field; San Diego, CA	T 0–0		
November 4	at USC	Los Angeles Memorial Coliseum; Los Angeles, CA	L 21–28	28,000	
November 19	at March Field	Hull Field; San Diego. CA	L 0–7	5,500	
