= 1944 Camp Beale Bears football team =

American college football season

1944 Camp Beale Bears football
- Conference: Independent
- Record: 5–4
- Head coach: George F. Haigh Jr.
- Home stadium: Knight Field

1944 military service football records
	Conf.			Overall
Team	W	L	T	W		L		T
No. 3 Randolph Field		–		11	–	0	–	0
No. 5 Bainbridge		–		10	–	0	–	0
No. 18 Fort Pierce		–		9	–	0	–	0
No. T–13 Norman NAS		–		6	–	0	–	0
No. 6 Iowa Pre-Flight		–		10	–	1	–	0
No. 16 El Toro Marines		–		8	–	1	–	0
Hondo AAF		–		7	–	1	–	0
Bunker Hill NAS		–		6	–	1	–	0
Lincoln AAF		–		6	–	1	–	0
Blackland AAF		–		7	–	1	–	1
Keesler Field		–		8	–	1	–	2
No. 17 Great Lakes Navy		–		9	–	2	–	1
No. 10 March Field		–		7	–	2	–	2
Third Air Force		–		8	–	3	–	0
North Carolina Pre-Flight		–		6	–	2	–	1
Atlantic City NAS		–		5	–	2	–	0
Camp Peary		–		5	–	2	–	0
Tonopah AAF		–		5	–	2	–	0
Daniel Field		–		7	–	3	–	0
No. 20 Second Air Force		–		10	–	4	–	1
San Francisco Coast Guard		–		4	–	2	–	1
Ellington Field		–		6	–	3	–	2
Amarillo AAF		–		5	–	3	–	0
Alameda Coast Guard		–		4	–	2	–	2
Coronado Amphibious		–		2	–	1	–	1
Olathe NAS		–		4	–	2	–	2
Selman Field		–		4	–	2	–	2
Galveston AAF		–		5	–	3	–	2
Fleet City		–		6	–	4	–	1
Jacksonville NAS		–		4	–	3	–	0
San Diego NTS		–		4	–	3	–	1
Camp Beale		–		5	–	4	–	0
Lubbock AAF		–		5	–	4	–	0
Fort Warren		–		5	–	4	–	1
Fort Monroe		–		5	–	5	–	0
Klamath Falls Marines		–		2	–	2	–	1
Maxwell Field		–		5	–	5	–	0
Minter Field		–		3	–	3	–	0
No. 19 Saint Mary's Pre-Flight		–		4	–	4	–	0
Fourth Infantry		–		3	–	4	–	2
Georgia Pre-Flight		–		4	–	5	–	0
Third Infantry		–		4	–	5	–	0
Melville PT Boats		–		3	–	0	–	0
Bergstrom Field		–		3	–	4	–	0
Ottumwa NAS		–		3	–	4	–	0
Camp Lee		–		3	–	5	–	0
Cherry Point Marines		–		3	–	6	–	0
Chatham Field		–		2	–	8	–	1
Sampton NTS		–		2	–	7	–	0
Miami NTC		–		2	–	8	–	0
Bryan AAF		–		1	–	7	–	0
Fairfield-Suisun AAB		–		1	–	7	–	0
Richmond AAB		–		0	–	10	–	1
Camp Ellis		–		0	–	5	–	0
South Plains AAF		–		0	–	8	–	0
Rankings from AP Poll

The 1943 Camp Beale Bears football team represented the United States Army's Camp Beale near Marysville, California during the 1944 college football season. Led by head coach George F. Haigh Jr., the Bears compiled a record of 5–4.

In the final Litkenhous Ratings, Camp Beale ranked 161st among the nation's college and service teams and 32nd out of 63 United States Army teams with a rating of 55.1.

== Schedule ==
Date	Time	Opponent	Site	Result	Attendance	Source
October 12	8:00 p.m.	at McClellan Field	Auburn Fairgrounds; Auburn, CA	L 6–20	3,000	
October 14	12:00 p.m.	at California Ramblers (JV)	California Memorial Stadium; Berkeley, CA	L 14–25		
October 20		at Klamath Falls Marine Barracks	Modoc Field; Klamath Falls, OR	L 0–8		
October 28		San Francisco Coast Guard	Knight Field; Marysville, CA	L 6–25		
November 4		McClellan Field	Marysville, CA	W 32–0		
November 11	8:00 p.m.	California Ramblers (JV)	Knight Field; Marysville, CA	W 19–0		
November 18	8:00 p.m.	Fairfield-Suisun AAB	Knight Field; Marysville, CA	W 12–0		
November 25		Seabee Stevedores	Marysville, CA	W 39–6		
December 1	8:00 p.m.	at Pacific (CA)	Baxter Stadium; Stockton, CA	W 6–2		
All times are in Pacific time
