= 1944 Bryan Army Air Field Ducks football team =

American college football season

1944 Bryan Army Air Field Ducks football
- Conference: Independent
- Record: 1–7
- Head coach: Roy C. Johnson (1st season)

1944 military service football records
	Conf.			Overall
Team	W	L	T	W		L		T
No. 3 Randolph Field		–		11	–	0	–	0
No. 5 Bainbridge		–		10	–	0	–	0
No. 18 Fort Pierce		–		9	–	0	–	0
No. T–13 Norman NAS		–		6	–	0	–	0
No. 6 Iowa Pre-Flight		–		10	–	1	–	0
No. 16 El Toro Marines		–		8	–	1	–	0
Hondo AAF		–		7	–	1	–	0
Bunker Hill NAS		–		6	–	1	–	0
Lincoln AAF		–		6	–	1	–	0
Blackland AAF		–		7	–	1	–	1
Keesler Field		–		8	–	1	–	2
No. 17 Great Lakes Navy		–		9	–	2	–	1
No. 10 March Field		–		7	–	2	–	2
Third Air Force		–		8	–	3	–	0
North Carolina Pre-Flight		–		6	–	2	–	1
Atlantic City NAS		–		5	–	2	–	0
Camp Peary		–		5	–	2	–	0
Tonopah AAF		–		5	–	2	–	0
Daniel Field		–		7	–	3	–	0
No. 20 Second Air Force		–		10	–	4	–	1
San Francisco Coast Guard		–		4	–	2	–	1
Ellington Field		–		6	–	3	–	2
Amarillo AAF		–		5	–	3	–	0
Alameda Coast Guard		–		4	–	2	–	2
Coronado Amphibious		–		2	–	1	–	1
Olathe NAS		–		4	–	2	–	2
Selman Field		–		4	–	2	–	2
Galveston AAF		–		5	–	3	–	2
Fleet City		–		6	–	4	–	1
Jacksonville NAS		–		4	–	3	–	0
San Diego NTS		–		4	–	3	–	1
Camp Beale		–		5	–	4	–	0
Lubbock AAF		–		5	–	4	–	0
Fort Warren		–		5	–	4	–	1
Fort Monroe		–		5	–	5	–	0
Klamath Falls Marines		–		2	–	2	–	1
Maxwell Field		–		5	–	5	–	0
Minter Field		–		3	–	3	–	0
No. 19 Saint Mary's Pre-Flight		–		4	–	4	–	0
Fourth Infantry		–		3	–	4	–	2
Georgia Pre-Flight		–		4	–	5	–	0
Third Infantry		–		4	–	5	–	0
Melville PT Boats		–		3	–	0	–	0
Bergstrom Field		–		3	–	4	–	0
Ottumwa NAS		–		3	–	4	–	0
Camp Lee		–		3	–	5	–	0
Cherry Point Marines		–		3	–	6	–	0
Chatham Field		–		2	–	8	–	1
Sampton NTS		–		2	–	7	–	0
Miami NTC		–		2	–	8	–	0
Bryan AAF		–		1	–	7	–	0
Fairfield-Suisun AAB		–		1	–	7	–	0
Richmond AAB		–		0	–	10	–	1
Camp Ellis		–		0	–	5	–	0
South Plains AAF		–		0	–	8	–	0
Rankings from AP Poll

The 1944 Bryan Army Air Field Ducks football team represented the United States Army Air Force's Bryan Army Air Field (Bryan AAF), located near Bryan, Texas, during the 1944 college football season. Led by head coach Roy C. Johnson, the Ducks compiled a record of 1–7 and were outscored by their opponents 152 to 12.

In the final Litkenhous Ratings, Bryan AAF ranked 225th among the nation's college and service teams and 44th out of 63 United States Army teams with a rating of 40.2.

== Schedule ==
Date	Time	Opponent	Site	Result	Source
September 23		at Texas A&M	Kyle Field; College Station, TX	L 0–39	
September 30		Blackland AAF	Bryan, TX	L 0–27	
October 7		vs. Ellington Field	Beaumont, TX	L 0–6	
October 14		at Galveston AAF	Galveston, TX	L 0–19	
October 21	8:00 p.m.	at Eagle Mountain Marines	Eagle Field; Denton, TX	W 6–0	
October 28		at Blackland AAF	Municipal Stadium; Waco, TX	L 0–41	
November 11		Ellington Field	Bryan, TX	L 0–7	
November 17		at Hondo AAF	Hondo, TX	L 6–13	
All times are in Central time
