= 1944 Camp Lee Travellers football team =

American college football season

1944 Camp Lee Travellers football
- Conference: Independent
- Record: 3–5
- Head coach: Ray Bedard (1st season)

1944 military service football records
| | Conf. | | | Overall |
| Team | W | L | T | W | | L | | T |
|---|---|---|---|---|---|---|---|---|
| No. 3 Randolph Field | | – | | 11 | – | 0 | – | 0 |
| No. 5 Bainbridge | | – | | 10 | – | 0 | – | 0 |
| No. 18 Fort Pierce | | – | | 9 | – | 0 | – | 0 |
| No. T–13 Norman NAS | | – | | 6 | – | 0 | – | 0 |
| No. 6 Iowa Pre-Flight | | – | | 10 | – | 1 | – | 0 |
| No. 16 El Toro Marines | | – | | 8 | – | 1 | – | 0 |
| Hondo AAF | | – | | 7 | – | 1 | – | 0 |
| Bunker Hill NAS | | – | | 6 | – | 1 | – | 0 |
| Lincoln AAF | | – | | 6 | – | 1 | – | 0 |
| Blackland AAF | | – | | 7 | – | 1 | – | 1 |
| Keesler Field | | – | | 8 | – | 1 | – | 2 |
| No. 17 Great Lakes Navy | | – | | 9 | – | 2 | – | 1 |
| No. 10 March Field | | – | | 7 | – | 2 | – | 2 |
| Third Air Force | | – | | 8 | – | 3 | – | 0 |
| North Carolina Pre-Flight | | – | | 6 | – | 2 | – | 1 |
| Atlantic City NAS | | – | | 5 | – | 2 | – | 0 |
| Camp Peary | | – | | 5 | – | 2 | – | 0 |
| Tonopah AAF | | – | | 5 | – | 2 | – | 0 |
| Daniel Field | | – | | 7 | – | 3 | – | 0 |
| No. 20 Second Air Force | | – | | 10 | – | 4 | – | 1 |
| San Francisco Coast Guard | | – | | 4 | – | 2 | – | 1 |
| Ellington Field | | – | | 6 | – | 3 | – | 2 |
| Amarillo AAF | | – | | 5 | – | 3 | – | 0 |
| Alameda Coast Guard | | – | | 4 | – | 2 | – | 2 |
| Coronado Amphibious | | – | | 2 | – | 1 | – | 1 |
| Olathe NAS | | – | | 4 | – | 2 | – | 2 |
| Selman Field | | – | | 4 | – | 2 | – | 2 |
| Galveston AAF | | – | | 5 | – | 3 | – | 2 |
| Fleet City | | – | | 6 | – | 4 | – | 1 |
| Jacksonville NAS | | – | | 4 | – | 3 | – | 0 |
| San Diego NTS | | – | | 4 | – | 3 | – | 1 |
| Camp Beale | | – | | 5 | – | 4 | – | 0 |
| Lubbock AAF | | – | | 5 | – | 4 | – | 0 |
| Fort Warren | | – | | 5 | – | 4 | – | 1 |
| Fort Monroe | | – | | 5 | – | 5 | – | 0 |
| Klamath Falls Marines | | – | | 2 | – | 2 | – | 1 |
| Maxwell Field | | – | | 5 | – | 5 | – | 0 |
| Minter Field | | – | | 3 | – | 3 | – | 0 |
| No. 19 Saint Mary's Pre-Flight | | – | | 4 | – | 4 | – | 0 |
| Fourth Infantry | | – | | 3 | – | 4 | – | 2 |
| Georgia Pre-Flight | | – | | 4 | – | 5 | – | 0 |
| Third Infantry | | – | | 4 | – | 5 | – | 0 |
| Melville PT Boats | | – | | 3 | – | 0 | – | 0 |
| Bergstrom Field | | – | | 3 | – | 4 | – | 0 |
| Ottumwa NAS | | – | | 3 | – | 4 | – | 0 |
| Camp Lee | | – | | 3 | – | 5 | – | 0 |
| Cherry Point Marines | | – | | 3 | – | 6 | – | 0 |
| Chatham Field | | – | | 2 | – | 8 | – | 1 |
| Sampton NTS | | – | | 2 | – | 7 | – | 0 |
| Miami NTC | | – | | 2 | – | 8 | – | 0 |
| Bryan AAF | | – | | 1 | – | 7 | – | 0 |
| Fairfield-Suisun AAB | | – | | 1 | – | 7 | – | 0 |
| Richmond AAB | | – | | 0 | – | 10 | – | 1 |
| Camp Ellis | | – | | 0 | – | 5 | – | 0 |
| South Plains AAF | | – | | 0 | – | 8 | – | 0 |
Rankings from AP Poll

The 1944 Camp Lee Travellers football team represented the United States Army post at Camp Lee, located in Prince George County, Virginia, during the 1944 college football season. Led by head coach Ray Bedard, the Travellers compiled a record of 3–5. The team's roster included Joe Watt.

In the final Litkenhous Ratings, Camp Lee ranked 159th among the national college and service teams and 31st out of 63 United States Army teams with a rating of 56.1.

== Schedule ==
| Date | Time | Opponent | Site | Result | Attendance | Source |
|---|---|---|---|---|---|---|
| September 30 | 2:30 p.m. | at Bainbridge | Tome Field; Bainbridge, MD | L 0–43 | | |
| October 8 | | at Camp Peary | Cary Field; Williamsburg, VA | L 0–38 | 10,000 | |
| October 15 | 2:30 p.m. | at Richmond AAB | Richmond, VA | W 18–0 | | |
| October 22 | | Fort Monroe | Petersburg, VA | cancelled | | |
| October 29 | | at Cherry Point Marines | Cherry Point, NC | L 0–6 | 10,000 | |
| November 5 | | Camp Peary | Camp Lee, VA | L 0–41 | | |
| November 12 | 2:00 p.m. | Richmond AAB | Camp Lee, VA | W 35–0 | | |
| November 19 | 2:00 p.m. | Fort Monroe | Camp Lee, VA | W 26–13 | 1,250 | |
| November 26 | 2:00 p.m. | Cherry Point Marines | Camp Lee, VA | L 0–13 | 12,000 | |
All times are in Eastern time
