= 1944 Fourth Infantry Raiders football team =

College football season

1944 Fourth Infantry Raiders football
- Conference: Independent
- Record: 3–4–2
- Head coach: Gene Myers (1st season)
- Home stadium: Doughboy Stadium

1944 military service football records
	Conf.			Overall
Team	W	L	T	W		L		T
No. 3 Randolph Field		–		11	–	0	–	0
No. 5 Bainbridge		–		10	–	0	–	0
No. 18 Fort Pierce		–		9	–	0	–	0
No. T–13 Norman NAS		–		6	–	0	–	0
No. 6 Iowa Pre-Flight		–		10	–	1	–	0
No. 16 El Toro Marines		–		8	–	1	–	0
Hondo AAF		–		7	–	1	–	0
Bunker Hill NAS		–		6	–	1	–	0
Lincoln AAF		–		6	–	1	–	0
Blackland AAF		–		7	–	1	–	1
Keesler Field		–		8	–	1	–	2
No. 17 Great Lakes Navy		–		9	–	2	–	1
No. 10 March Field		–		7	–	2	–	2
Third Air Force		–		8	–	3	–	0
North Carolina Pre-Flight		–		6	–	2	–	1
Atlantic City NAS		–		5	–	2	–	0
Camp Peary		–		5	–	2	–	0
Tonopah AAF		–		5	–	2	–	0
Daniel Field		–		7	–	3	–	0
No. 20 Second Air Force		–		10	–	4	–	1
San Francisco Coast Guard		–		4	–	2	–	1
Ellington Field		–		6	–	3	–	2
Amarillo AAF		–		5	–	3	–	0
Alameda Coast Guard		–		4	–	2	–	2
Coronado Amphibious		–		2	–	1	–	1
Olathe NAS		–		4	–	2	–	2
Selman Field		–		4	–	2	–	2
Galveston AAF		–		5	–	3	–	2
Fleet City		–		6	–	4	–	1
Jacksonville NAS		–		4	–	3	–	0
San Diego NTS		–		4	–	3	–	1
Camp Beale		–		5	–	4	–	0
Lubbock AAF		–		5	–	4	–	0
Fort Warren		–		5	–	4	–	1
Fort Monroe		–		5	–	5	–	0
Klamath Falls Marines		–		2	–	2	–	1
Maxwell Field		–		5	–	5	–	0
Minter Field		–		3	–	3	–	0
No. 19 Saint Mary's Pre-Flight		–		4	–	4	–	0
Fourth Infantry		–		3	–	4	–	2
Georgia Pre-Flight		–		4	–	5	–	0
Third Infantry		–		4	–	5	–	0
Melville PT Boats		–		3	–	0	–	0
Bergstrom Field		–		3	–	4	–	0
Ottumwa NAS		–		3	–	4	–	0
Camp Lee		–		3	–	5	–	0
Cherry Point Marines		–		3	–	6	–	0
Chatham Field		–		2	–	8	–	1
Sampton NTS		–		2	–	7	–	0
Miami NTC		–		2	–	8	–	0
Bryan AAF		–		1	–	7	–	0
Fairfield-Suisun AAB		–		1	–	7	–	0
Richmond AAB		–		0	–	10	–	1
Camp Ellis		–		0	–	5	–	0
South Plains AAF		–		0	–	8	–	0
Rankings from AP Poll

The 1944 Fourth Infantry Raiders football team represented the Fourth Infantry Regiment of the United States Army Infantry School at Fort Benning, located near Columbus, Georgia, during the 1944 college football season. Led by head coach Gene Myers, the Raiders compiled a record of 3–4–2.

In the final Litkenhous Ratings, Fourth Infantry ranked 70th among the nation's college and service teams and 11th out of 63 United States Army teams with a rating of 81.5.

== Schedule ==
Date	Time	Opponent	Site	Result	Attendance	Source
September 28	8:00 p.m.	Chatham Field	Doughboy Stadium; Fort Benning, GA	T 0–0	12,000	
October 7	4:00 p.m.	at Auburn	Auburn Stadium; Auburn, AL	L 0–7	5,000	
October 15	2:00 p.m.	vs. Third Infantry	Doughboy Stadium; Fort Benning, GA	W 14–6	22,000	
October 20	8:00 p.m.	at Louisiana Tech	Tech Stadium; Ruston, LA	W 33–0		
October 29	2:00 p.m.	Keesler Field	Doughboy Stadium; Fort Benning, GA	T 7–7	22,000	
November 5	3:30 p.m.	at Maxwell Field	Cramton Bowl; Montgomery, AL	L 7–25	8,000	
November 18		at Jacksonville NAS	Mason Field; Jacksonville, FL	L 19–26	5,000	
November 22	8:00 p.m.	Maxwell Field	Doughboy Stadium; Fort Benning, GA	L 7–26	12,000	
December 3	2:00 p.m.	vs. Third Infantry	Doughboy Stadium; Fort Benning, GA	W 9–7	18,000	
All times are in Eastern time
