= 1944 Lubbock Army Air Field Fliers football team =

American college football season

1944 Lubbock Army Air Field Fliers football
- Conference: Independent
- Record: 5–4
- Head coach: G. B. Morris & Albert Wirz (2nd season)
- Home stadium: Tech Field

1944 military service football records
	Conf.			Overall
Team	W	L	T	W		L		T
No. 3 Randolph Field		–		11	–	0	–	0
No. 5 Bainbridge		–		10	–	0	–	0
No. 18 Fort Pierce		–		9	–	0	–	0
No. T–13 Norman NAS		–		6	–	0	–	0
No. 6 Iowa Pre-Flight		–		10	–	1	–	0
No. 16 El Toro Marines		–		8	–	1	–	0
Hondo AAF		–		7	–	1	–	0
Bunker Hill NAS		–		6	–	1	–	0
Lincoln AAF		–		6	–	1	–	0
Blackland AAF		–		7	–	1	–	1
Keesler Field		–		8	–	1	–	2
No. 17 Great Lakes Navy		–		9	–	2	–	1
No. 10 March Field		–		7	–	2	–	2
Third Air Force		–		8	–	3	–	0
North Carolina Pre-Flight		–		6	–	2	–	1
Atlantic City NAS		–		5	–	2	–	0
Camp Peary		–		5	–	2	–	0
Tonopah AAF		–		5	–	2	–	0
Daniel Field		–		7	–	3	–	0
No. 20 Second Air Force		–		10	–	4	–	1
San Francisco Coast Guard		–		4	–	2	–	1
Ellington Field		–		6	–	3	–	2
Amarillo AAF		–		5	–	3	–	0
Alameda Coast Guard		–		4	–	2	–	2
Coronado Amphibious		–		2	–	1	–	1
Olathe NAS		–		4	–	2	–	2
Selman Field		–		4	–	2	–	2
Galveston AAF		–		5	–	3	–	2
Fleet City		–		6	–	4	–	1
Jacksonville NAS		–		4	–	3	–	0
San Diego NTS		–		4	–	3	–	1
Camp Beale		–		5	–	4	–	0
Lubbock AAF		–		5	–	4	–	0
Fort Warren		–		5	–	4	–	1
Fort Monroe		–		5	–	5	–	0
Klamath Falls Marines		–		2	–	2	–	1
Maxwell Field		–		5	–	5	–	0
Minter Field		–		3	–	3	–	0
No. 19 Saint Mary's Pre-Flight		–		4	–	4	–	0
Fourth Infantry		–		3	–	4	–	2
Georgia Pre-Flight		–		4	–	5	–	0
Third Infantry		–		4	–	5	–	0
Melville PT Boats		–		3	–	0	–	0
Bergstrom Field		–		3	–	4	–	0
Ottumwa NAS		–		3	–	4	–	0
Camp Lee		–		3	–	5	–	0
Cherry Point Marines		–		3	–	6	–	0
Chatham Field		–		2	–	8	–	1
Sampton NTS		–		2	–	7	–	0
Miami NTC		–		2	–	8	–	0
Bryan AAF		–		1	–	7	–	0
Fairfield-Suisun AAB		–		1	–	7	–	0
Richmond AAB		–		0	–	10	–	1
Camp Ellis		–		0	–	5	–	0
South Plains AAF		–		0	–	8	–	0
Rankings from AP Poll

The 1944 Lubbock Army Air Field Fliers football team, sometimes called the "Flyers", represented the United States Army Air Forces's Lubbock Army Air Field (Lubbock AAF or LAAF), located near Lubbock, Texas, during the 1944 college football season. Led by coaches G. B. Morris and Albert Wirz, the Fliers compiled a record of 5–4.

In the final Litkenhous Ratings, Lubbock AAF ranked 84th among the nation's college and service teams and 13th out of 63 United States Army teams with a rating of 76.1.

== Schedule ==
Date	Time	Opponent	Site	Result	Attendance	Source
September 23	8:00 p.m.	at Texas Tech	Tech Field; Lubbock, TX	W 27–13		
September 30	8:15 p.m.	Amarillo AAF	Tech Field; Lubbock, TX	L 0–19		
October 7	8:00 p.m.	at Amarillo AAF	Tech Field; Lubbock, TX	L 0–31		
October 14		Beaumont General Hospital	Tech Field; Lubbock, TX	W 19–5		
October 22	2:30 p.m.	vs. South Plains AAF	Tech Field; Lubbock, TX (Khaki Classic)	W 46–14	4,000	
October 28	8:00 p.m.	Fort Bliss	Tech Field; Lubbock, TX	W 13–0		
November 3	8:00 p.m.	at West Texas State	Buffalo Stadium; Canyon, TX	L 12–14		
November 11		No. 15 Norman NAS	Tech Field; Lubbock, TX	L 0–42	3,000	
November 18		at John Tarleton	Stephenville, TX	W 67–0		
Rankings from AP Poll released prior to the game; All times are in Central time
