= 1944 Bergstrom Field Troop Carriers football team =

American college football season

1944 Bergstrom Field Troop Carriers football
- Conference: Independent
- Record: 3–4
- Head coach: Henry G. Smith
- Home stadium: House Park

1944 military service football records
	Conf.			Overall
Team	W	L	T	W		L		T
No. 3 Randolph Field		–		11	–	0	–	0
No. 5 Bainbridge		–		10	–	0	–	0
No. 18 Fort Pierce		–		9	–	0	–	0
No. T–13 Norman NAS		–		6	–	0	–	0
No. 6 Iowa Pre-Flight		–		10	–	1	–	0
No. 16 El Toro Marines		–		8	–	1	–	0
Hondo AAF		–		7	–	1	–	0
Bunker Hill NAS		–		6	–	1	–	0
Lincoln AAF		–		6	–	1	–	0
Blackland AAF		–		7	–	1	–	1
Keesler Field		–		8	–	1	–	2
No. 17 Great Lakes Navy		–		9	–	2	–	1
No. 10 March Field		–		7	–	2	–	2
Third Air Force		–		8	–	3	–	0
North Carolina Pre-Flight		–		6	–	2	–	1
Atlantic City NAS		–		5	–	2	–	0
Camp Peary		–		5	–	2	–	0
Tonopah AAF		–		5	–	2	–	0
Daniel Field		–		7	–	3	–	0
No. 20 Second Air Force		–		10	–	4	–	1
San Francisco Coast Guard		–		4	–	2	–	1
Ellington Field		–		6	–	3	–	2
Amarillo AAF		–		5	–	3	–	0
Alameda Coast Guard		–		4	–	2	–	2
Coronado Amphibious		–		2	–	1	–	1
Olathe NAS		–		4	–	2	–	2
Selman Field		–		4	–	2	–	2
Galveston AAF		–		5	–	3	–	2
Fleet City		–		6	–	4	–	1
Jacksonville NAS		–		4	–	3	–	0
San Diego NTS		–		4	–	3	–	1
Camp Beale		–		5	–	4	–	0
Lubbock AAF		–		5	–	4	–	0
Fort Warren		–		5	–	4	–	1
Fort Monroe		–		5	–	5	–	0
Klamath Falls Marines		–		2	–	2	–	1
Maxwell Field		–		5	–	5	–	0
Minter Field		–		3	–	3	–	0
No. 19 Saint Mary's Pre-Flight		–		4	–	4	–	0
Fourth Infantry		–		3	–	4	–	2
Georgia Pre-Flight		–		4	–	5	–	0
Third Infantry		–		4	–	5	–	0
Melville PT Boats		–		3	–	0	–	0
Bergstrom Field		–		3	–	4	–	0
Ottumwa NAS		–		3	–	4	–	0
Camp Lee		–		3	–	5	–	0
Cherry Point Marines		–		3	–	6	–	0
Chatham Field		–		2	–	8	–	1
Sampton NTS		–		2	–	7	–	0
Miami NTC		–		2	–	8	–	0
Bryan AAF		–		1	–	7	–	0
Fairfield-Suisun AAB		–		1	–	7	–	0
Richmond AAB		–		0	–	10	–	1
Camp Ellis		–		0	–	5	–	0
South Plains AAF		–		0	–	8	–	0
Rankings from AP Poll

The 1944 Bergstrom Field Troop Carriers football team represented the United States Army Air Force's Bergstrom Field near Austin, Texas during the 1944 college football season. Led by head coach Henry G. Smith, the Troop Carriers compiled a record of 3–4.

In the final Litkenhous Ratings, Bergstrom Field ranked 101st among the nation's college and service teams and 16th out of 63 United States Army teams with a rating of 72.7.

== Schedule ==
Date	Time	Opponent	Site	Result	Attendance	Source
September 30	8:00 p.m.	John Tarleton	House Park; Austin, TX	W 33–0	5,000	
October 7	8:00 p.m.	Blackland AAF	House Park; Austin, TX	W 19–12	4,000	
October 12		at John Tarleton	Stephenville, TX	W 39–6		
October 21	8:00 p.m.	Ellington Field	House Park; Austin, TX	L 13–20		
October 28	8:00 p.m.	Arkansas A&M	House Park; Austin, TX	L 0–7	6,000	
November 2	8:00 p.m.	at Hondo AAF	Barry Field; Hondo, TX	L 0–27	4,000	
November 11	8:00 p.m.	at Blackland AAF	Waco High School stadium; Waco, TX	L 0–7		
All times are in Central time
