= 1944 Fort Warren Broncos football team =

American college football season

1944 Fort Warren Broncos football
- Conference: Independent
- Record: 5–4–1
- Head coach: Wee Willie Smith (2nd season)
- Home stadium: Warren Bowl

1944 military service football records
	Conf.			Overall
Team	W	L	T	W		L		T
No. 3 Randolph Field		–		11	–	0	–	0
No. 5 Bainbridge		–		10	–	0	–	0
No. 18 Fort Pierce		–		9	–	0	–	0
No. T–13 Norman NAS		–		6	–	0	–	0
No. 6 Iowa Pre-Flight		–		10	–	1	–	0
No. 16 El Toro Marines		–		8	–	1	–	0
Hondo AAF		–		7	–	1	–	0
Bunker Hill NAS		–		6	–	1	–	0
Lincoln AAF		–		6	–	1	–	0
Blackland AAF		–		7	–	1	–	1
Keesler Field		–		8	–	1	–	2
No. 17 Great Lakes Navy		–		9	–	2	–	1
No. 10 March Field		–		7	–	2	–	2
Third Air Force		–		8	–	3	–	0
North Carolina Pre-Flight		–		6	–	2	–	1
Atlantic City NAS		–		5	–	2	–	0
Camp Peary		–		5	–	2	–	0
Tonopah AAF		–		5	–	2	–	0
Daniel Field		–		7	–	3	–	0
No. 20 Second Air Force		–		10	–	4	–	1
San Francisco Coast Guard		–		4	–	2	–	1
Ellington Field		–		6	–	3	–	2
Amarillo AAF		–		5	–	3	–	0
Alameda Coast Guard		–		4	–	2	–	2
Coronado Amphibious		–		2	–	1	–	1
Olathe NAS		–		4	–	2	–	2
Selman Field		–		4	–	2	–	2
Galveston AAF		–		5	–	3	–	2
Fleet City		–		6	–	4	–	1
Jacksonville NAS		–		4	–	3	–	0
San Diego NTS		–		4	–	3	–	1
Camp Beale		–		5	–	4	–	0
Lubbock AAF		–		5	–	4	–	0
Fort Warren		–		5	–	4	–	1
Fort Monroe		–		5	–	5	–	0
Klamath Falls Marines		–		2	–	2	–	1
Maxwell Field		–		5	–	5	–	0
Minter Field		–		3	–	3	–	0
No. 19 Saint Mary's Pre-Flight		–		4	–	4	–	0
Fourth Infantry		–		3	–	4	–	2
Georgia Pre-Flight		–		4	–	5	–	0
Third Infantry		–		4	–	5	–	0
Melville PT Boats		–		3	–	0	–	0
Bergstrom Field		–		3	–	4	–	0
Ottumwa NAS		–		3	–	4	–	0
Camp Lee		–		3	–	5	–	0
Cherry Point Marines		–		3	–	6	–	0
Chatham Field		–		2	–	8	–	1
Sampton NTS		–		2	–	7	–	0
Miami NTC		–		2	–	8	–	0
Bryan AAF		–		1	–	7	–	0
Fairfield-Suisun AAB		–		1	–	7	–	0
Richmond AAB		–		0	–	10	–	1
Camp Ellis		–		0	–	5	–	0
South Plains AAF		–		0	–	8	–	0
Rankings from AP Poll

The 1944 Fort Warren Broncos football team represented the United States Army base at Fort Warren, located in Cheyenne, Wyoming, during the 1944 college football season. Led by second-year head coach Wee Willie Smith, the Broncos compiled a record of 5–4–1.

In the final Litkenhous Ratings, Fort Warren ranked 20th among the nation's college and service teams and fifth out of 63 United States Army teams with a rating of 102.6.

== Schedule ==
Date	Time	Opponent	Site	Result	Attendance	Source
September 10		Brooklyn Tigers	Warren Bowl; Cheyenne, WY	W 21–20		
September 23		at Colorado	Colorado Stadium; Boulder, CO	W 7–6		
October 1	1:00 p.m.	at Lincoln AAF	Memorial Stadium; Lincoln, NE	L 5–14	10,000–12,000	
October 7		at Colorado College	Colorado Stadium; Colorado Springs, CO	W 33–13		
October 15		Idaho Southern Branch	Warren Bowl; Cheyenne, WY	W 66–0		
October 22		at No. 5 Iowa Pre-Flight	Iowa Stadium; Iowa City, IA	L 0–30	8,000	
October 29		Lincoln AAF	Warren Bowl; Cheyenne, WY	W 19–6		
November 5		McCook AAF	Cheyenne, WY	cancelled		
November 12		vs. Second Air Force	Denver, CO	L 0–20		
November 18		Pocatello Marines	Cheyenne, WY	cancelled		
November 25		at No. 12 Great Lakes Navy	Ross Field; Great Lakes, IL	L 7–28	23,000	
December 3	3:30 p.m.	at San Francisco Clippers	Kezar Stadium; San Francisco, CA	T 21–21	14,000–15,000	
Rankings from AP Poll released prior to the game; All times are in Mountain time
