= 1944 San Francisco Coast Guard Pilots football team =

American college football season

1944 San Francisco Coast Guard Pilots football
- Conference: Independent
- Record: 4–2–1
- Head coach: Al Tassi & Bill Howard

1944 military service football records
	Conf.			Overall
Team	W	L	T	W		L		T
No. 3 Randolph Field		–		11	–	0	–	0
No. 5 Bainbridge		–		10	–	0	–	0
No. 18 Fort Pierce		–		9	–	0	–	0
No. T–13 Norman NAS		–		6	–	0	–	0
No. 6 Iowa Pre-Flight		–		10	–	1	–	0
No. 16 El Toro Marines		–		8	–	1	–	0
Hondo AAF		–		7	–	1	–	0
Bunker Hill NAS		–		6	–	1	–	0
Lincoln AAF		–		6	–	1	–	0
Blackland AAF		–		7	–	1	–	1
Keesler Field		–		8	–	1	–	2
No. 17 Great Lakes Navy		–		9	–	2	–	1
No. 10 March Field		–		7	–	2	–	2
Third Air Force		–		8	–	3	–	0
North Carolina Pre-Flight		–		6	–	2	–	1
Atlantic City NAS		–		5	–	2	–	0
Camp Peary		–		5	–	2	–	0
Tonopah AAF		–		5	–	2	–	0
Daniel Field		–		7	–	3	–	0
No. 20 Second Air Force		–		10	–	4	–	1
San Francisco Coast Guard		–		4	–	2	–	1
Ellington Field		–		6	–	3	–	2
Amarillo AAF		–		5	–	3	–	0
Alameda Coast Guard		–		4	–	2	–	2
Coronado Amphibious		–		2	–	1	–	1
Olathe NAS		–		4	–	2	–	2
Selman Field		–		4	–	2	–	2
Galveston AAF		–		5	–	3	–	2
Fleet City		–		6	–	4	–	1
Jacksonville NAS		–		4	–	3	–	0
San Diego NTS		–		4	–	3	–	1
Camp Beale		–		5	–	4	–	0
Lubbock AAF		–		5	–	4	–	0
Fort Warren		–		5	–	4	–	1
Fort Monroe		–		5	–	5	–	0
Klamath Falls Marines		–		2	–	2	–	1
Maxwell Field		–		5	–	5	–	0
Minter Field		–		3	–	3	–	0
No. 19 Saint Mary's Pre-Flight		–		4	–	4	–	0
Fourth Infantry		–		3	–	4	–	2
Georgia Pre-Flight		–		4	–	5	–	0
Third Infantry		–		4	–	5	–	0
Melville PT Boats		–		3	–	0	–	0
Bergstrom Field		–		3	–	4	–	0
Ottumwa NAS		–		3	–	4	–	0
Camp Lee		–		3	–	5	–	0
Cherry Point Marines		–		3	–	6	–	0
Chatham Field		–		2	–	8	–	1
Sampton NTS		–		2	–	7	–	0
Miami NTC		–		2	–	8	–	0
Bryan AAF		–		1	–	7	–	0
Fairfield-Suisun AAB		–		1	–	7	–	0
Richmond AAB		–		0	–	10	–	1
Camp Ellis		–		0	–	5	–	0
South Plains AAF		–		0	–	8	–	0
Rankings from AP Poll

The 1944 San Francisco Coast Guard Pilots football team was an American football team that represented the United States Coast Guard's Bay and Powell Receiving Station during the 1944 college football season. The team compiled a 4–2–1 record.

The team was newly organized in 1944 by Lt. Comdr. W. H. Maybaum at the request of a number of men who had returned from the Pacific battle area. Maybaum noted that 75% of the 40 men on the team had seen more than a year overseas.

With the San Francisco Dons football program idle due to the war, the Pilots used the Dons' uniforms and its coaches, Al Tassi and Bill Howard. Emlen Tunnell, later inducted into the Pro Football Hall of Fame, played for the team. Walter Heap, who played quarterback for the Los Angeles Dons after the war, also played for the 1944 Pilots.

In the final Litkenhous Ratings, San Francisco Coast Guard ranked 95th among the nation's college and service teams and fourth of out six United States Coast Guard teams with a rating of 74.1.

== Schedule ==
Date	Opponent	Site	Result	Attendance	Source
September 30	at Cal Ramblers	Memorial Stadium; Berkeley, CA	W 33–6		
October 14	at Fleet City	Forster Field; Shoemaker, CA	L 6–27	10,000	
October 22	at Fairfield-Suisun AAB	Corbus Field; Vallejo, CA	W 40–6	4,000	
October 28	at Camp Beale	Marysville, CA	W 25–6		
November 5	Klamath Falls Marine Barracks	Modoc Field; Klamath Falls, OR	T 6–6	2,500	
November 11	at Pacific (CA)	Baxter Stadium; Stockton, CA	W 13–0	1,500	
November 25	vs. No. 16 El Toro Marines	Santa Barbara, CA	L 0–60		
Rankings from AP Poll released prior to the game
