= 1944 Camp Ellis Cardinals football team =

American college football season

1944 Camp Ellis Cardinals football
- Conference: Independent
- Record: 0–5
- Head coach: Ray Adams (1st season)

1944 military service football records
	Conf.			Overall
Team	W	L	T	W		L		T
No. 3 Randolph Field		–		11	–	0	–	0
No. 5 Bainbridge		–		10	–	0	–	0
No. 18 Fort Pierce		–		9	–	0	–	0
No. T–13 Norman NAS		–		6	–	0	–	0
No. 6 Iowa Pre-Flight		–		10	–	1	–	0
No. 16 El Toro Marines		–		8	–	1	–	0
Hondo AAF		–		7	–	1	–	0
Bunker Hill NAS		–		6	–	1	–	0
Lincoln AAF		–		6	–	1	–	0
Blackland AAF		–		7	–	1	–	1
Keesler Field		–		8	–	1	–	2
No. 17 Great Lakes Navy		–		9	–	2	–	1
No. 10 March Field		–		7	–	2	–	2
Third Air Force		–		8	–	3	–	0
North Carolina Pre-Flight		–		6	–	2	–	1
Atlantic City NAS		–		5	–	2	–	0
Camp Peary		–		5	–	2	–	0
Tonopah AAF		–		5	–	2	–	0
Daniel Field		–		7	–	3	–	0
No. 20 Second Air Force		–		10	–	4	–	1
San Francisco Coast Guard		–		4	–	2	–	1
Ellington Field		–		6	–	3	–	2
Amarillo AAF		–		5	–	3	–	0
Alameda Coast Guard		–		4	–	2	–	2
Coronado Amphibious		–		2	–	1	–	1
Olathe NAS		–		4	–	2	–	2
Selman Field		–		4	–	2	–	2
Galveston AAF		–		5	–	3	–	2
Fleet City		–		6	–	4	–	1
Jacksonville NAS		–		4	–	3	–	0
San Diego NTS		–		4	–	3	–	1
Camp Beale		–		5	–	4	–	0
Lubbock AAF		–		5	–	4	–	0
Fort Warren		–		5	–	4	–	1
Fort Monroe		–		5	–	5	–	0
Klamath Falls Marines		–		2	–	2	–	1
Maxwell Field		–		5	–	5	–	0
Minter Field		–		3	–	3	–	0
No. 19 Saint Mary's Pre-Flight		–		4	–	4	–	0
Fourth Infantry		–		3	–	4	–	2
Georgia Pre-Flight		–		4	–	5	–	0
Third Infantry		–		4	–	5	–	0
Melville PT Boats		–		3	–	0	–	0
Bergstrom Field		–		3	–	4	–	0
Ottumwa NAS		–		3	–	4	–	0
Camp Lee		–		3	–	5	–	0
Cherry Point Marines		–		3	–	6	–	0
Chatham Field		–		2	–	8	–	1
Sampton NTS		–		2	–	7	–	0
Miami NTC		–		2	–	8	–	0
Bryan AAF		–		1	–	7	–	0
Fairfield-Suisun AAB		–		1	–	7	–	0
Richmond AAB		–		0	–	10	–	1
Camp Ellis		–		0	–	5	–	0
South Plains AAF		–		0	–	8	–	0
Rankings from AP Poll

The 1944 Camp Ellis Cardinals football team represented Camp Ellis, in Fulton County, Illinois, during the 1944 college football season. Led by head coach Ray Adams, the Cardinals compiled a record of 0–5.

In the final Litkenhous Ratings, Camp Ellis ranked 134th among the nation's college and service teams and 22nd out of 63 United States Army teams with a rating of 60.8.

== Schedule ==
Date	Time	Opponent	Site	Result	Attendance	Source
October 1		Ottumwa NAS	Camp Ellis, IL	L 7–45	8,000–10,000	
October 7	2:00 p.m.	at Lawrence	Whiting Field; Appleton, WI	L 7–20		
October 15		Bunker Hill NAS	Camp Ellis, IL	L 0–34		
October 22	2:00 p.m.	at Ottumwa NAS	Ottumwa High School Stadium; Ottumwa, IA	L 33–0	7,000	
November 4		at Bunker Hill NAS	Naval Air Station Bunker Hill; Bunker Hill, IN	L 0–33		
All times are in Central time
