= 1944 Jacksonville Naval Air Station Fliers football team =

American college football season

1944 Jacksonville Naval Air Station Fliers football
- Conference: Independent
- Record: 4–3
- Head coach: Don Faurot (1st season)
- Home stadium: Mason Field

1944 military service football records
	Conf.			Overall
Team	W	L	T	W		L		T
No. 3 Randolph Field		–		11	–	0	–	0
No. 5 Bainbridge		–		10	–	0	–	0
No. 18 Fort Pierce		–		9	–	0	–	0
No. T–13 Norman NAS		–		6	–	0	–	0
No. 6 Iowa Pre-Flight		–		10	–	1	–	0
No. 16 El Toro Marines		–		8	–	1	–	0
Hondo AAF		–		7	–	1	–	0
Bunker Hill NAS		–		6	–	1	–	0
Lincoln AAF		–		6	–	1	–	0
Blackland AAF		–		7	–	1	–	1
Keesler Field		–		8	–	1	–	2
No. 17 Great Lakes Navy		–		9	–	2	–	1
No. 10 March Field		–		7	–	2	–	2
Third Air Force		–		8	–	3	–	0
North Carolina Pre-Flight		–		6	–	2	–	1
Atlantic City NAS		–		5	–	2	–	0
Camp Peary		–		5	–	2	–	0
Tonopah AAF		–		5	–	2	–	0
Daniel Field		–		7	–	3	–	0
No. 20 Second Air Force		–		10	–	4	–	1
San Francisco Coast Guard		–		4	–	2	–	1
Ellington Field		–		6	–	3	–	2
Amarillo AAF		–		5	–	3	–	0
Alameda Coast Guard		–		4	–	2	–	2
Coronado Amphibious		–		2	–	1	–	1
Olathe NAS		–		4	–	2	–	2
Selman Field		–		4	–	2	–	2
Galveston AAF		–		5	–	3	–	2
Fleet City		–		6	–	4	–	1
Jacksonville NAS		–		4	–	3	–	0
San Diego NTS		–		4	–	3	–	1
Camp Beale		–		5	–	4	–	0
Lubbock AAF		–		5	–	4	–	0
Fort Warren		–		5	–	4	–	1
Fort Monroe		–		5	–	5	–	0
Klamath Falls Marines		–		2	–	2	–	1
Maxwell Field		–		5	–	5	–	0
Minter Field		–		3	–	3	–	0
No. 19 Saint Mary's Pre-Flight		–		4	–	4	–	0
Fourth Infantry		–		3	–	4	–	2
Georgia Pre-Flight		–		4	–	5	–	0
Third Infantry		–		4	–	5	–	0
Melville PT Boats		–		3	–	0	–	0
Bergstrom Field		–		3	–	4	–	0
Ottumwa NAS		–		3	–	4	–	0
Camp Lee		–		3	–	5	–	0
Cherry Point Marines		–		3	–	6	–	0
Chatham Field		–		2	–	8	–	1
Sampton NTS		–		2	–	7	–	0
Miami NTC		–		2	–	8	–	0
Bryan AAF		–		1	–	7	–	0
Fairfield-Suisun AAB		–		1	–	7	–	0
Richmond AAB		–		0	–	10	–	1
Camp Ellis		–		0	–	5	–	0
South Plains AAF		–		0	–	8	–	0
Rankings from AP Poll

The 1944 Jacksonville Naval Air Station Fliers football team represented the Jacksonville Naval Air Station (Jacksonville NAS) during the 1944 college football season. Led by head coach Don Faurot, the Fliers compiled a record of 4–3. The team's roster included George Faust, Bill Leckonby, and Allie White.

In the final Litkenhous Ratings, Jacksonville NAS ranked 57th among the nation's college and service teams and 13th out of 28 United States Navy teams with a rating of 85.1.

== Schedule ==
Date	Time	Opponent	Site	Result	Attendance	Source
October 7	8:00 p.m.	at Florida	Florida Field; Gainesville, FL	L 20–27	4,500	
October 14		Miami NTC	Mason Field; Jacksonville, FL	W 39–13	5,000	
October 28	3:30 p.m.	No. 9 North Carolina Pre-Flight	Mason Field; Jacksonville, FL	L 13–14		
November 4	4:00 p.m.	Cherry Point Marines	Mason Field; Jacksonville, FL	W 33–0	6,000	
November 12	2:00 p.m.	at Third Infantry	Doughboy Stadium; Fort Benning, GA	W 35–13	25,000	
November 18		Fourth Infantry	Mason Field; Jacksonville, FL	W 26–19	5,000	
November 25		Fort Pierce	Mason Field; Jacksonville, FL	L 0–21	10,000	
Rankings from AP Poll released prior to the game; All times are in Eastern time
