= 1944 Klamath Falls Marine Barracks football team =

American college football season

1944 Klamath Falls Marine Barracks football
- Starting backfield Merlin Morehouse, Roy Walters, William Salvadori, and Frank Bancer
- Conference: Independent
- Record: 2–2–1
- Head coach: Clyde Roberts

1944 military service football records
	Conf.			Overall
Team	W	L	T	W		L		T
No. 3 Randolph Field		–		11	–	0	–	0
No. 5 Bainbridge		–		10	–	0	–	0
No. 18 Fort Pierce		–		9	–	0	–	0
No. T–13 Norman NAS		–		6	–	0	–	0
No. 6 Iowa Pre-Flight		–		10	–	1	–	0
No. 16 El Toro Marines		–		8	–	1	–	0
Hondo AAF		–		7	–	1	–	0
Bunker Hill NAS		–		6	–	1	–	0
Lincoln AAF		–		6	–	1	–	0
Blackland AAF		–		7	–	1	–	1
Keesler Field		–		8	–	1	–	2
No. 17 Great Lakes Navy		–		9	–	2	–	1
No. 10 March Field		–		7	–	2	–	2
Third Air Force		–		8	–	3	–	0
North Carolina Pre-Flight		–		6	–	2	–	1
Atlantic City NAS		–		5	–	2	–	0
Camp Peary		–		5	–	2	–	0
Tonopah AAF		–		5	–	2	–	0
Daniel Field		–		7	–	3	–	0
No. 20 Second Air Force		–		10	–	4	–	1
San Francisco Coast Guard		–		4	–	2	–	1
Ellington Field		–		6	–	3	–	2
Amarillo AAF		–		5	–	3	–	0
Alameda Coast Guard		–		4	–	2	–	2
Coronado Amphibious		–		2	–	1	–	1
Olathe NAS		–		4	–	2	–	2
Selman Field		–		4	–	2	–	2
Galveston AAF		–		5	–	3	–	2
Fleet City		–		6	–	4	–	1
Jacksonville NAS		–		4	–	3	–	0
San Diego NTS		–		4	–	3	–	1
Camp Beale		–		5	–	4	–	0
Lubbock AAF		–		5	–	4	–	0
Fort Warren		–		5	–	4	–	1
Fort Monroe		–		5	–	5	–	0
Klamath Falls Marines		–		2	–	2	–	1
Maxwell Field		–		5	–	5	–	0
Minter Field		–		3	–	3	–	0
No. 19 Saint Mary's Pre-Flight		–		4	–	4	–	0
Fourth Infantry		–		3	–	4	–	2
Georgia Pre-Flight		–		4	–	5	–	0
Third Infantry		–		4	–	5	–	0
Melville PT Boats		–		3	–	0	–	0
Bergstrom Field		–		3	–	4	–	0
Ottumwa NAS		–		3	–	4	–	0
Camp Lee		–		3	–	5	–	0
Cherry Point Marines		–		3	–	6	–	0
Chatham Field		–		2	–	8	–	1
Sampton NTS		–		2	–	7	–	0
Miami NTC		–		2	–	8	–	0
Bryan AAF		–		1	–	7	–	0
Fairfield-Suisun AAB		–		1	–	7	–	0
Richmond AAB		–		0	–	10	–	1
Camp Ellis		–		0	–	5	–	0
South Plains AAF		–		0	–	8	–	0
Rankings from AP Poll

The 1944 Klamath Falls Marine Barracks football team was an American football team that represented the United States Marines Corps' Marine Barracks at Klamath Falls, Oregon, during the 1944 college football season. The team compiled a 2–2–1 record and played its home games at Modoc Field.

The Klamath Falls Barracks were built in 1944 as a treatment and rehabilitation center for Marines returning from the Pacific Theater of Operations, especially those suffering from mosquito-borne diseases. Players were recruited from the 2,000-plus Marines undergoing treatment at the center.

Maj. Clyde C. Roberts was the head coach and ran the team in a single wingback formation. Roberts was the executive officer at the barracks and had been head coach at the Brown Military Academy in San Diego.

In the final Litkenhous Ratings, Klamath Falls Marines ranked 254th among the nation's college and service teams and fourth of six United States Marine Corps teams with a rating of 29.3.

== Schedule ==
Date	Opponent	Site	Result	Attendance	Source
September 30	Willamette	Modoc Field; Klamath Falls, OR	L 14–33		
October 7	California Ramblers	Modoc Field; Klamath Falls, OR	L 0–13	2,000	
October 14	at Fairfield-Suisun AAB	Corbus Field; Vallejo, CA	W 14–12		
October 20	Camp Beale	Modoc Field; Klamath Falls, OR	W 8–0		
November 5	at San Francisco Coast Guard	Modoc Field; Klamath Falls, OR	T 6–6	2,500	
November 12	Fairfield-Suisun AAB	Modoc Field; Klamath Falls, OR	Cancelled due to takeoff accident		
