= 1944 Bunker Hill Naval Air Station Blockbusters football team =

American college football season

1944 Bunker Hill Naval Air Station Blockbusters football
- Conference: Independent
- Record: 6–1
- Head coach: Howard Kissell (2nd season); Len Watters (1st season)

1944 military service football records
	Conf.			Overall
Team	W	L	T	W		L		T
No. 3 Randolph Field		–		11	–	0	–	0
No. 5 Bainbridge		–		10	–	0	–	0
No. 18 Fort Pierce		–		9	–	0	–	0
No. T–13 Norman NAS		–		6	–	0	–	0
No. 6 Iowa Pre-Flight		–		10	–	1	–	0
No. 16 El Toro Marines		–		8	–	1	–	0
Hondo AAF		–		7	–	1	–	0
Bunker Hill NAS		–		6	–	1	–	0
Lincoln AAF		–		6	–	1	–	0
Blackland AAF		–		7	–	1	–	1
Keesler Field		–		8	–	1	–	2
No. 17 Great Lakes Navy		–		9	–	2	–	1
No. 10 March Field		–		7	–	2	–	2
Third Air Force		–		8	–	3	–	0
North Carolina Pre-Flight		–		6	–	2	–	1
Atlantic City NAS		–		5	–	2	–	0
Camp Peary		–		5	–	2	–	0
Tonopah AAF		–		5	–	2	–	0
Daniel Field		–		7	–	3	–	0
No. 20 Second Air Force		–		10	–	4	–	1
San Francisco Coast Guard		–		4	–	2	–	1
Ellington Field		–		6	–	3	–	2
Amarillo AAF		–		5	–	3	–	0
Alameda Coast Guard		–		4	–	2	–	2
Coronado Amphibious		–		2	–	1	–	1
Olathe NAS		–		4	–	2	–	2
Selman Field		–		4	–	2	–	2
Galveston AAF		–		5	–	3	–	2
Fleet City		–		6	–	4	–	1
Jacksonville NAS		–		4	–	3	–	0
San Diego NTS		–		4	–	3	–	1
Camp Beale		–		5	–	4	–	0
Lubbock AAF		–		5	–	4	–	0
Fort Warren		–		5	–	4	–	1
Fort Monroe		–		5	–	5	–	0
Klamath Falls Marines		–		2	–	2	–	1
Maxwell Field		–		5	–	5	–	0
Minter Field		–		3	–	3	–	0
No. 19 Saint Mary's Pre-Flight		–		4	–	4	–	0
Fourth Infantry		–		3	–	4	–	2
Georgia Pre-Flight		–		4	–	5	–	0
Third Infantry		–		4	–	5	–	0
Melville PT Boats		–		3	–	0	–	0
Bergstrom Field		–		3	–	4	–	0
Ottumwa NAS		–		3	–	4	–	0
Camp Lee		–		3	–	5	–	0
Cherry Point Marines		–		3	–	6	–	0
Chatham Field		–		2	–	8	–	1
Sampton NTS		–		2	–	7	–	0
Miami NTC		–		2	–	8	–	0
Bryan AAF		–		1	–	7	–	0
Fairfield-Suisun AAB		–		1	–	7	–	0
Richmond AAB		–		0	–	10	–	1
Camp Ellis		–		0	–	5	–	0
South Plains AAF		–		0	–	8	–	0
Rankings from AP Poll

The 1944 Bunker Hill Naval Air Station Blockbusters football team represented Naval Air Station Bunker Hill in the 1944 college football season. The team compiled a record 6–1. Lieutenant Howard Kissell was the team's head coach until mid-October when he was reassigned overseas and replaced by Lieutenant Commander Len Watters.

In the final Litkenhous Ratings, Bunker Hill NAS ranked 36th among the nation's college and service teams and sixth out of 28 United States Navy teams with a rating of 95.0.

== Schedule ==
Date	Time	Opponent	Site	Result	Attendance	Source
September 23		at Western Michigan	Waldo Stadium; Kalamazoo, MI	W 33–7		
October 7		Ottumwa NAS	Naval Air Station Bunker Hill; Bunker Hill, IN	W 14–13		
October 15		at Camp Ellis	Camp Ellis, IL	W 34–0		
October 21		Bowling Green	Naval Air Station Bunker Hill; Bunker Hill, IN	W 27–7		
October 29	2:00 p.m.	at Ottumwa NAS	Ottumwa High School Stadium; Ottumwa, IA	W 13–0	8,500	
November 4		Camp Ellis	Naval Air Station Bunker Hill; Bunker Hill, IN	W 33–0		
November 11		at No. 7 Iowa Pre-Flight	Iowa Stadium; Iowa City, IA	L 7–33	4,000	
Rankings from AP Poll released prior to the game
