= 1944 Norman Naval Air Station Zoomers football team =

American college football season

1944 Norman Naval Air Station Zoomers football
- Conference: Independent

Ranking
- AP: No. T–13
- Record: 6–0
- Head coach: John Gregg (2nd season)
- Home stadium: Memorial Stadium

1944 military service football records
	Conf.			Overall
Team	W	L	T	W		L		T
No. 3 Randolph Field		–		11	–	0	–	0
No. 5 Bainbridge		–		10	–	0	–	0
No. 18 Fort Pierce		–		9	–	0	–	0
No. T–13 Norman NAS		–		6	–	0	–	0
No. 6 Iowa Pre-Flight		–		10	–	1	–	0
No. 16 El Toro Marines		–		8	–	1	–	0
Hondo AAF		–		7	–	1	–	0
Bunker Hill NAS		–		6	–	1	–	0
Lincoln AAF		–		6	–	1	–	0
Blackland AAF		–		7	–	1	–	1
Keesler Field		–		8	–	1	–	2
No. 17 Great Lakes Navy		–		9	–	2	–	1
No. 10 March Field		–		7	–	2	–	2
Third Air Force		–		8	–	3	–	0
North Carolina Pre-Flight		–		6	–	2	–	1
Atlantic City NAS		–		5	–	2	–	0
Camp Peary		–		5	–	2	–	0
Tonopah AAF		–		5	–	2	–	0
Daniel Field		–		7	–	3	–	0
No. 20 Second Air Force		–		10	–	4	–	1
San Francisco Coast Guard		–		4	–	2	–	1
Ellington Field		–		6	–	3	–	2
Amarillo AAF		–		5	–	3	–	0
Alameda Coast Guard		–		4	–	2	–	2
Coronado Amphibious		–		2	–	1	–	1
Olathe NAS		–		4	–	2	–	2
Selman Field		–		4	–	2	–	2
Galveston AAF		–		5	–	3	–	2
Fleet City		–		6	–	4	–	1
Jacksonville NAS		–		4	–	3	–	0
San Diego NTS		–		4	–	3	–	1
Camp Beale		–		5	–	4	–	0
Lubbock AAF		–		5	–	4	–	0
Fort Warren		–		5	–	4	–	1
Fort Monroe		–		5	–	5	–	0
Klamath Falls Marines		–		2	–	2	–	1
Maxwell Field		–		5	–	5	–	0
Minter Field		–		3	–	3	–	0
No. 19 Saint Mary's Pre-Flight		–		4	–	4	–	0
Fourth Infantry		–		3	–	4	–	2
Georgia Pre-Flight		–		4	–	5	–	0
Third Infantry		–		4	–	5	–	0
Melville PT Boats		–		3	–	0	–	0
Bergstrom Field		–		3	–	4	–	0
Ottumwa NAS		–		3	–	4	–	0
Camp Lee		–		3	–	5	–	0
Cherry Point Marines		–		3	–	6	–	0
Chatham Field		–		2	–	8	–	1
Sampton NTS		–		2	–	7	–	0
Miami NTC		–		2	–	8	–	0
Bryan AAF		–		1	–	7	–	0
Fairfield-Suisun AAB		–		1	–	7	–	0
Richmond AAB		–		0	–	10	–	1
Camp Ellis		–		0	–	5	–	0
South Plains AAF		–		0	–	8	–	0
Rankings from AP Poll

The 1944 Norman Naval Air Station Zoomers football team represented the Naval Air Station Norman during the 1944 college football season. The station was located in Norman, Oklahoma. The team compiled a 6–0 record, outscored opponents by a total of 144 to 40, and was ranked No. 13 in the final AP poll. The team won games against major college teams, Oklahoma, Arkansas, and Oklahoma A&M. Lt. Commander John Gregg was the team's coach.

In the final Litkenhous Ratings, Norman ranked 22nd among the nation's college and service teams and third out of 28 United States Navy teams with a rating of 101.3.

== Schedule ==
Date	Time	Opponent	Rank	Site	Result	Attendance	Source
September 30		at Oklahoma		Memorial Stadium; Norman, OK	W 28–14	15,000	
October 14		at Arkansas		Razorback Stadium; Fayetteville, AR	W 27–7		
October 21	8:00 p.m.	at Amarillo AAF		Butler Field; Amarillo, TX	W 19–13		
October 29	2:30 p.m.	Second Air Force		Memorial Stadium; Norman, OK	W 13–6		
November 4		at No. 19 Oklahoma A&M		Lewis Field; Stillwater, OK	W 15–0	7,000	
November 11		at Lubbock AAF	No. 15	Tech Field; Lubbock, TX	W 42–0	3,000	
Rankings from AP Poll released prior to the game; All times are in Central time

== Rankings ==
The AP released their first rankings on October 9. The Zoomers entered the rankings on November 6.

Ranking movements Legend: ██ Increase in ranking ██ Decrease in ranking — = Not ranked т = Tied with team above or below
	Week								
Poll	1	2	3	4	5	6	7	8	Final
AP	—	—	—	—	15	18т	17	13	13т
