= 1944 Maxwell Field Marauders football team =

American college football season

1944 Maxwell Field Marauders football
- Conference: Independent
- Record: 5–5
- Head coach: Jesse Yarborough
- Home stadium: Cramton Bowl

1944 military service football records
	Conf.			Overall
Team	W	L	T	W		L		T
No. 3 Randolph Field		–		11	–	0	–	0
No. 5 Bainbridge		–		10	–	0	–	0
No. 18 Fort Pierce		–		9	–	0	–	0
No. T–13 Norman NAS		–		6	–	0	–	0
No. 6 Iowa Pre-Flight		–		10	–	1	–	0
No. 16 El Toro Marines		–		8	–	1	–	0
Hondo AAF		–		7	–	1	–	0
Bunker Hill NAS		–		6	–	1	–	0
Lincoln AAF		–		6	–	1	–	0
Blackland AAF		–		7	–	1	–	1
Keesler Field		–		8	–	1	–	2
No. 17 Great Lakes Navy		–		9	–	2	–	1
No. 10 March Field		–		7	–	2	–	2
Third Air Force		–		8	–	3	–	0
North Carolina Pre-Flight		–		6	–	2	–	1
Atlantic City NAS		–		5	–	2	–	0
Camp Peary		–		5	–	2	–	0
Tonopah AAF		–		5	–	2	–	0
Daniel Field		–		7	–	3	–	0
No. 20 Second Air Force		–		10	–	4	–	1
San Francisco Coast Guard		–		4	–	2	–	1
Ellington Field		–		6	–	3	–	2
Amarillo AAF		–		5	–	3	–	0
Alameda Coast Guard		–		4	–	2	–	2
Coronado Amphibious		–		2	–	1	–	1
Olathe NAS		–		4	–	2	–	2
Selman Field		–		4	–	2	–	2
Galveston AAF		–		5	–	3	–	2
Fleet City		–		6	–	4	–	1
Jacksonville NAS		–		4	–	3	–	0
San Diego NTS		–		4	–	3	–	1
Camp Beale		–		5	–	4	–	0
Lubbock AAF		–		5	–	4	–	0
Fort Warren		–		5	–	4	–	1
Fort Monroe		–		5	–	5	–	0
Klamath Falls Marines		–		2	–	2	–	1
Maxwell Field		–		5	–	5	–	0
Minter Field		–		3	–	3	–	0
No. 19 Saint Mary's Pre-Flight		–		4	–	4	–	0
Fourth Infantry		–		3	–	4	–	2
Georgia Pre-Flight		–		4	–	5	–	0
Third Infantry		–		4	–	5	–	0
Melville PT Boats		–		3	–	0	–	0
Bergstrom Field		–		3	–	4	–	0
Ottumwa NAS		–		3	–	4	–	0
Camp Lee		–		3	–	5	–	0
Cherry Point Marines		–		3	–	6	–	0
Chatham Field		–		2	–	8	–	1
Sampton NTS		–		2	–	7	–	0
Miami NTC		–		2	–	8	–	0
Bryan AAF		–		1	–	7	–	0
Fairfield-Suisun AAB		–		1	–	7	–	0
Richmond AAB		–		0	–	10	–	1
Camp Ellis		–		0	–	5	–	0
South Plains AAF		–		0	–	8	–	0
Rankings from AP Poll

The 1944 Maxwell Field Marauders football team represented Maxwell Field during the 1944 college football season. Under head coach Jesse Yarborough, the Marauders compiled a 5–5 record.

Halfback Johnny Clement starred for the team, completing 41 of 107 passes for 534 yards, scoring 70 points, and tallying 862 rushing yards on 150 carries (5.7 yards per carry).

In the final Litkenhous Ratings, Third Air Force ranked 79th among the nation's college and service teams and 12th out of 63 United States Army teams with a rating of 77.6.

== Schedule ==
Date	Time	Opponent	Site	Result	Attendance	Source
October 1	2:30 p.m.	Third Infantry	Cramton Bowl; Montgomery, AL	L 0–26	15,000	
October 8		Kinston MCAA	Cramton Bowl; Montgomery, AL	W 62–0	6,000	
October 22		Chatham Field	Cramton Bowl; Montgomery, AL	W 40–0		
October 29		No. 13 Bainbridge	Cramton Bowl; Montgomery, AL	L 7–15		
November 5	2:30 p.m.	Fourth Infantry	Cramton Bowl; Montgomery, AL	W 25–7	8,000	
November 11		at No. 3 Randolph Field	Alamo Stadium; San Antonio, TX	L 0–25	15,911	
November 19		at Third Air Force	Phillips Field; Tampa, FL	L 7–41	12,000	
November 22	7:00 p.m.	at Fourth Infantry	Doughboy Stadium; Fort Benning, GA	W 26–7	12,000	
November 25	7:15 p.m.	at Miami NTC	Burdine Stadium; Miami, FL	W 13–0		
December 3		at No. 5 Bainbridge	Tome Field; Bainbridge, MD	L 3–13		
Rankings from AP Poll released prior to the game; All times are in Central time
