= Al Nichelini =

American football player (1909–1992)

Profile
- Position: Running back

Personal information
- Born: November 23, 1909; St. Helena, California
- Died: January 3, 1992 (aged 82); Fresno, California
- Listed height: 6 ft 0 in (1.83 m)
- Listed weight: 207 lb (94 kg)

Career information
- College: St. Mary's

Career history
- Chicago Cardinals (1935–1936)

Allen James Nichelini (November 23, 1909 – January 3, 1992) was an American football running back who played in the National Football League from 1935 to 1936 for the Chicago Cardinals. Nichelini posted 423 rushing yards and 133 receiving yards in his two seasons. In 1935, he scored four rushing touchdowns, tied for second in the league.
