= 1944 college football rankings =

- Season: 1944
- Bowl season: 1944–45 bowl games
- End of season champions: Army

One human poll comprised the 1944 college football rankings. Unlike most sports, college football's governing body, the NCAA, does not bestow a national championship, instead that title is bestowed by one or more different polling agencies. There are two main weekly polls that begin in the preseason—the AP Poll and the Coaches' Poll. The Coaches' Poll began operation in 1950; in addition, the AP Poll did not begin conducting preseason polls until that same year.

== Legend ==
	Increase in ranking
	Decrease in ranking
	Not ranked previous week
	National champion
(#–#)	Win–loss record
(Italics)	Number of first place votes
т	Tied with team above or below also with this symbol

== AP Poll ==
The final AP Poll was released on December 4, at the end of the 1944 regular season, weeks before the major bowls. The AP would not release a post-bowl season final poll regularly until 1968.

	Week 1 Oct 9	Week 2 Oct 16	Week 3 Oct 23	Week 4 Oct 30	Week 5 Nov 6	Week 6 Nov 13	Week 7 Nov 20	Week 8 Nov 27	Week 9 (Final) Dec 4	
1.	Notre Dame (2–0) (34)	Notre Dame (3–0) (59.67)	Notre Dame (4–0) (40)	Army (5–0) (41)	Army (6–0) (58)	Army (7–0) (77)	Army (8–0) (65.33)	Army (8–0) (55.33)	Army (9–0) (95)	1.
2.	North Carolina Pre-Flight (3–0) (24)	Army (3–0) (11.67)	Army (4–0) (30)	Notre Dame (5–0) (15)	Ohio State (6–0) (18)	Randolph Field (7–0) (15)	Navy (6–2) (5)	Navy (6–2) (1)	Ohio State (9–0) (5)	2.
3.	Army (2–0) (3)	Randolph Field (3–0) (21.58)	Randolph Field (4–0) (23)	Ohio State (5–0) (17)	Navy (4–2) (1)	Navy (5–2) (5)	Ohio State (8–0) (5)	Ohio State (9–0) (18) т	Randolph Field (9–0) (17)	3.
4.	Randolph Field (2–0) (22)	Ohio State (3–0) (4)	Ohio State (4–0) (14)	Randolph Field (5–0) (18)	Randolph Field (6–0) (18)	Ohio State (7–0) (3)	Randolph Field (8–0) (11.33)	Randolph Field (9–0) (5.33) т	Navy (6–3)	4.
5.	Great Lakes Navy (2–0) (3)	Iowa Pre-Flight (4–1) (0.25)	Georgia Tech (4–0)	Georgia Tech (5–0) (1)	Notre Dame (5–1)	Michigan (7–1)	Bainbridge NTS (8–0) (4.33)	Bainbridge NTS (9–0) (11.33)	Bainbridge NTS (10–0) (3)	5.
6.	Navy (2–0)	Great Lakes Navy (3–0) (1)	Iowa Pre-Flight (5–1)	Navy (3–2) (1)	Bainbridge NTS (6–0) (6)	Bainbridge NTS (7–0) (4)	Michigan (8–1)	Iowa Pre-Flight (10–1) (1)	Iowa Pre-Flight (10–1) (1)	6.
7.	Purdue (2–1) (2)	Penn (3–0) (3)	Penn (3–0) т	Iowa Pre-Flight (6–1)	Iowa Pre-Flight (7–1)	Iowa Pre-Flight (8–1)	Iowa Pre-Flight (9–1) (2)	USC (7–0–2)	USC (7–0–2)	7.
8.	Ohio State (2–0) (2)	Georgia Tech (3–0)	Tulsa (4–0) т	North Carolina Pre-Flight (5–0–1)	Michigan (6–1)	March Field (6–0–1) (2)	USC (6–0–2) (1)	Michigan (8–2)	Michigan (8–2)	8.
9.	Penn (2–0)	Navy (2–1)	North Carolina Pre-Flight (4–0–1)	Illinois (4–2–1)	March Field (5–0–1) (3)	Georgia Tech (6–1)	March Field (7–0–1) (3)	Notre Dame (7–2)	Notre Dame (8–2)	9.
10.	Georgia Tech (2–0)	North Carolina Pre-Flight (3–0–1)	Purdue (3–2)	Michigan (5–1)	Illinois (4–2–1)	Duke (3–4)	Georgia Tech (7–1)	Tennessee (7–0–1)	March Field (7–0–2)	10.
11.	Iowa Pre-Flight (3–1) (1)	Purdue (2–2)	March Field (3–0–1)	March Field (4–0–1) (6)	USC (5–0–2)	Notre Dame (5–2)	Duke (4–4) (1)	Duke (5–4)	Duke (6–4)	11.
12.	Michigan (3–1)	California (3–0–1) (1)	Navy (2–2)	Bainbridge NTS (5–0) (2)	Wake Forest (7–0) (1)	USC (5–0–2)	Great Lakes Navy (7–1)	Great Lakes Navy (8–1)	Tennessee (7–0–1)	12.
13.	Tulsa (2–0)	Tulsa (3–0)	Bainbridge NTS (4–0) (2)	USC (4–0–2)	Georgia Tech (5–1)	Great Lakes Navy (6–1)	Alabama (4–1–2)	Norman NAS (6–0)	Georgia Tech (8–2) т	13.
14.	Illinois (2–0)	March Field (2–0–1) (1)	Illinois (4–1–1)	Great Lakes Navy (4–1)	Great Lakes Navy (5–1)	Purdue (5–3)	Camp Peary (6–1)	March Field (7–0–2)	Norman NAS (6–0) т	14.
15.	Second Air Force (3–1) т	Michigan (4–1) т	Second Air Force (5–1)	Indiana (5–1)	Norman NAS (5–0)	El Toro Marines (5–1)	Tennessee (6–0–1)	Oklahoma A&M (7–1)	Illinois (5–4–1)	15.
16.	Tennessee (2–0) (1) т	USC (2–0–2) т	Great Lakes Navy (3–1)	Tennessee (4–0–1)	North Carolina Pre-Flight (5–1–1)	Mississippi State (6–0)	El Toro Marines (6–1)	Alabama (5–1–2)	El Toro Marines (7–1)	16.
17.	Wake Forest (3–0)	Tennessee (3–0)	Indiana (4–1)	Wake Forest (6–0)	El Toro Marines (4–1)	Tennessee (5–0–1)	Norman NAS (6–0)	Camp Peary (6–2)	Great Lakes Navy (8–2)	17.
18.	Bainbridge NTS (2–0)	Bainbridge NTS (3–0) (2)	Wake Forest (5–0)	Mississippi State (4–0)	Tennessee (5–0–1)	Norman NAS (6–0) т	Notre Dame (6–2)	El Toro Marines (7–1) т	Fort Pierce (8–0)	18.
19.	Indiana (2–1) т	Second Air Force (4–1) (0.25)	3rd Air Force (4–0) т	Alabama (3–0–2) т	Mississippi State (5–0)	North Carolina Pre-Flight (6–1–1) т	Second Air Force (8–2)	Yale (7–0–1) т	Saint Mary's Pre-Flight (4–4)	19.
20.	Wisconsin (2–0) т	Indiana (3–1)	Mississippi State (4–0) т; Tennessee (3–0–1) т	Oklahoma A&M (5–0) т	Duke (2–4)	Yale (6–0)	North Carolina Pre-Flight (6–2–1)	Second Air Force (8–2–1)	Second Air Force (8–2–1)	20.
	Week 1 Oct 9	Week 2 Oct 16	Week 3 Oct 23	Week 4 Oct 30	Week 5 Nov 6	Week 6 Nov 13	Week 7 Nov 20	Week 8 Nov 27	Week 9 (Final) Dec 4	
		Dropped: Illinois; Wake Forest; Wisconsin	Dropped: California; Michigan; USC	Dropped: Second Air Force; 3rd Air Force; Penn; Purdue; Tulsa	Dropped: Alabama; Indiana; Oklahoma A&M	Dropped: Illinois; Wake Forest	Dropped: Mississippi State; Purdue; Yale	Dropped: Georgia Tech; North Carolina Pre-Flight	Dropped: Alabama; Camp Peary; Oklahoma A&M; Yale	

== Litkenhous Ratings ==
The final Litkenhous Ratings released in December 1944 provided numerical rankings to more than 300 college and military football programs. The top 100 ranked teams were:

1. Army (9–0)
2. Randolph Field (11–0)
3. Ohio State (9–0)
4. Navy (6–3)
5. Notre Dame (8–2)
6. Second Air Force (10–4–1)
7. Michigan (8–2)
8. Iowa Pre-Flight (10–1)
9. Georgia Tech (8–3)
10. Indiana (7–3)
11. Great Lakes Navy (9–2–1)
12. Purdue (5–5)
13. Illinois (5–4–1)
14. Duke (6–4)
15. Minnesota (5–3–1)
16. Fourth Air Force (7–2–2)
17. Lincoln Army Air Field (6–1)
18. Tulsa (8–2)
19. Alabama (5–2–2)
20. Fort Warren (5–4–1)
21. Colorado (6–2)
22. Norman NAS (6–0)
23. El Toro Marines (8–1)
24. Penn (5–3)
25. USC (8–0–2)
26. Fort Pierce Amphibs (9–0)
27. Third Air Force (8–3)
28. Bainbridge NTS (10–0)
29. Tennessee (7–1–1)
30. Wisconsin (3–6)
31. Mississippi State (6–2)
32. Oklahoma A&M (8–1)
33. LSU (2–5–1)
34. Northwestern (1–7–1)
35. Georgia (7–3)
36. Bunker Hill NAS (6–1)
37. Amarillo AAF (5–3)
38. Texas (5–4)
39. Camp Peary (5–2)
40. North Carolina Pre-Flight (6–2–1)
41. Tulane (4–3)
42. Texas A&M (7–4)
43. Saint Mary's Pre-Flight (4–4)
44. Wake Forest (8–1)
45. Washington (5–3)
46. Georgia Pre-Flight (4–5)
47. UCLA (4–5–1)
48. Oklahoma (6–3–1)
49. San Diego NTS
50. Ottumwa NAS
51. Berkeley CGS
52. Marquette
53. Camp Shoemaker
54. Fleet City
55. Auburn
56. Alameda Coast Guard
57. Jacksonville NAS
58. Virginia
59. Utah
60. Arkansas
61. Denver
62. Kentucky
63. Rice
64. Yale
65. TCU
66. NC State
67. Kessler Field
68. Colorado College
69. Clemson
70. Fort Benning Fourth
71. Missouri
72. Iowa
73. Michigan State
74. Coast Guard Academy
75. Iowa State
76. California
77. SMU
78. North Carolina
79. Maxwell Field
80. Pittsburgh
81. Brown
82. Southwestern (TX)
83. Cornell
84. Lubbock American Air Force
85. Ole Miss
86. Maryville
87. Penn State
88. Denison
89. William & Mary
90. Navy PT School
91. Western Michigan
92. Colorado Amphibs
93. South Carolina
94. Arkansas Aggies
95. San Francisco Coast Guard
96. Texas Tech
97. Peru Navy
98. Dartmouth
99. Holy Cross
100. Fort Benning Third

== See also ==
- 1944 College Football All-America Team
