= 1944 Second Air Force Superbombers football team =

American college football season

1944 Second Air Force Superbombers football

Treasury Bond Bowl, L 6–13 vs. Randolph Field
- Conference: Independent

Ranking
- AP: No. 20
- Record: 10–4–1
- Head coach: Red Reese (2nd season)
- Home stadium: Penrose Stadium

1944 military service football records
	Conf.			Overall
Team	W	L	T	W		L		T
No. 3 Randolph Field		–		11	–	0	–	0
No. 5 Bainbridge		–		10	–	0	–	0
No. 18 Fort Pierce		–		9	–	0	–	0
No. T–13 Norman NAS		–		6	–	0	–	0
No. 6 Iowa Pre-Flight		–		10	–	1	–	0
No. 16 El Toro Marines		–		8	–	1	–	0
Hondo AAF		–		7	–	1	–	0
Bunker Hill NAS		–		6	–	1	–	0
Lincoln AAF		–		6	–	1	–	0
Blackland AAF		–		7	–	1	–	1
Keesler Field		–		8	–	1	–	2
No. 17 Great Lakes Navy		–		9	–	2	–	1
No. 10 March Field		–		7	–	2	–	2
Third Air Force		–		8	–	3	–	0
North Carolina Pre-Flight		–		6	–	2	–	1
Atlantic City NAS		–		5	–	2	–	0
Camp Peary		–		5	–	2	–	0
Tonopah AAF		–		5	–	2	–	0
Daniel Field		–		7	–	3	–	0
No. 20 Second Air Force		–		10	–	4	–	1
San Francisco Coast Guard		–		4	–	2	–	1
Ellington Field		–		6	–	3	–	2
Amarillo AAF		–		5	–	3	–	0
Alameda Coast Guard		–		4	–	2	–	2
Coronado Amphibious		–		2	–	1	–	1
Olathe NAS		–		4	–	2	–	2
Selman Field		–		4	–	2	–	2
Galveston AAF		–		5	–	3	–	2
Fleet City		–		6	–	4	–	1
Jacksonville NAS		–		4	–	3	–	0
San Diego NTS		–		4	–	3	–	1
Camp Beale		–		5	–	4	–	0
Lubbock AAF		–		5	–	4	–	0
Fort Warren		–		5	–	4	–	1
Fort Monroe		–		5	–	5	–	0
Klamath Falls Marines		–		2	–	2	–	1
Maxwell Field		–		5	–	5	–	0
Minter Field		–		3	–	3	–	0
No. 19 Saint Mary's Pre-Flight		–		4	–	4	–	0
Fourth Infantry		–		3	–	4	–	2
Georgia Pre-Flight		–		4	–	5	–	0
Third Infantry		–		4	–	5	–	0
Melville PT Boats		–		3	–	0	–	0
Bergstrom Field		–		3	–	4	–	0
Ottumwa NAS		–		3	–	4	–	0
Camp Lee		–		3	–	5	–	0
Cherry Point Marines		–		3	–	6	–	0
Chatham Field		–		2	–	8	–	1
Sampton NTS		–		2	–	7	–	0
Miami NTC		–		2	–	8	–	0
Bryan AAF		–		1	–	7	–	0
Fairfield-Suisun AAB		–		1	–	7	–	0
Richmond AAB		–		0	–	10	–	1
Camp Ellis		–		0	–	5	–	0
South Plains AAF		–		0	–	8	–	0
Rankings from AP Poll

The 1944 Second Air Force Superbombers football team represented the Second Air Force during the 1944 college football season. The team, based in Colorado Springs, Colorado, compiled a 10–4–1 record, outscored opponents by a total of 513 to 76, and was ranked No. 20 in the final AP poll.

The team played many of the other leading service teams, losing to Randolph Field (No. 3 in the final AP Poll), Iowa Pre-Flight (No. 6), and Norman NAS (No. 14), and a Third Air Force team led by Charley Trippi. The Superbombers also played to a tie against March Field (No. 10).

Major William B. "Red" Reese, who coached football and basketball at Eastern Washington College before the war, was the team's head coach. Notable players on the 1944 Second Air Force squad included Glenn Dobbs, Bill Sewell, Don Fambrough, Nick Susoeff, Ray Evans, John Harrington, Johnny Strzykalski, and Visco Grgich.

In the final Litkenhous Ratings, Second Air Force ranked sixth among the nation's college and service teams and second out of 63 United States Army teams with a rating of 117.9.

== Schedule ==
Date	Time	Opponent	Rank	Site	Result	Attendance	Source
September 2		vs. Peru Teachers Navy V-12		City Stadium; Sioux City, IA	W 38–0	10,000	
September 8		Colorado College		Penrose Stadium; Colorado Springs, CO	W 24–0	10,000	
September 17		at Idaho Southern Branch		Spud Bowl; Pocatello, ID	W 45–0		
September 23	1:30 p.m.	vs. Whitman		Public School Field; Boise, ID	W 78–0	7,000	
September 30		at Colorado		Colorado Stadium; Boulder, CO	W 33–6		
October 7		vs. Iowa Pre-Flight		Memorial Stadium; Lincoln, NE	L 6–12	29,500	
October 14		vs. New Mexico	No. 15	Kidd Field; El Paso, TX	W 89–6	10,000	
October 21		vs. North Texas Aggies	No. 19	Fly Stadium; Odessa, TX	W 68–0	8,000	
October 29	1:30 p.m.	at Norman NAS	No. 15	Memorial Stadium; Norman, OK	L 6–13		
November 5		Amarillo AAF		Penrose Stadium; Colorado Springs, CO	W 46–6	6,000	
November 12		vs. Fort Warren		Denver, CO	W 20–0		
November 18		vs. Washington		Gonzaga Stadium; Spokane, WA	W 47–6	6,592	
November 26		No. 9 March Field	No. 19	Denver, CO	T 0–0	12,000	
December 10		vs. Third Air Force	No. 20	Grant Field; Atlanta, GA	L 7–14	8,000	
December 16		vs. No. 3 Randolph Field	No. 20	Polo Grounds; New York, New York (Treasury Bond Bowl)	L 6–13	8,356	
Rankings from AP Poll released prior to the game; All times are in Mountain time

== Rankings ==
Ranking movements Legend: ██ Increase in ranking ██ Decrease in ranking — = Not ranked т = Tied with team above or below ( ) = First-place votes
	Week								
Poll	1	2	3	4	5	6	7	8	Final
AP	15т	19 (0.25)	15	—	—	—	19	20	20
