= 1944 Amarillo Army Air Field Sky Giants football team =

American college football season

1944 Amarillo Army Air Field Sky Giants football
- Conference: Independent
- Record: 5–3
- Head coach: Dan Salkeld (1st season)
- Home stadium: Butler Field

1944 military service football records
	Conf.			Overall
Team	W	L	T	W		L		T
No. 3 Randolph Field		–		11	–	0	–	0
No. 5 Bainbridge		–		10	–	0	–	0
No. 18 Fort Pierce		–		9	–	0	–	0
No. T–13 Norman NAS		–		6	–	0	–	0
No. 6 Iowa Pre-Flight		–		10	–	1	–	0
No. 16 El Toro Marines		–		8	–	1	–	0
Hondo AAF		–		7	–	1	–	0
Bunker Hill NAS		–		6	–	1	–	0
Lincoln AAF		–		6	–	1	–	0
Blackland AAF		–		7	–	1	–	1
Keesler Field		–		8	–	1	–	2
No. 17 Great Lakes Navy		–		9	–	2	–	1
No. 10 March Field		–		7	–	2	–	2
Third Air Force		–		8	–	3	–	0
North Carolina Pre-Flight		–		6	–	2	–	1
Atlantic City NAS		–		5	–	2	–	0
Camp Peary		–		5	–	2	–	0
Tonopah AAF		–		5	–	2	–	0
Daniel Field		–		7	–	3	–	0
No. 20 Second Air Force		–		10	–	4	–	1
San Francisco Coast Guard		–		4	–	2	–	1
Ellington Field		–		6	–	3	–	2
Amarillo AAF		–		5	–	3	–	0
Alameda Coast Guard		–		4	–	2	–	2
Coronado Amphibious		–		2	–	1	–	1
Olathe NAS		–		4	–	2	–	2
Selman Field		–		4	–	2	–	2
Galveston AAF		–		5	–	3	–	2
Fleet City		–		6	–	4	–	1
Jacksonville NAS		–		4	–	3	–	0
San Diego NTS		–		4	–	3	–	1
Camp Beale		–		5	–	4	–	0
Lubbock AAF		–		5	–	4	–	0
Fort Warren		–		5	–	4	–	1
Fort Monroe		–		5	–	5	–	0
Klamath Falls Marines		–		2	–	2	–	1
Maxwell Field		–		5	–	5	–	0
Minter Field		–		3	–	3	–	0
No. 19 Saint Mary's Pre-Flight		–		4	–	4	–	0
Fourth Infantry		–		3	–	4	–	2
Georgia Pre-Flight		–		4	–	5	–	0
Third Infantry		–		4	–	5	–	0
Melville PT Boats		–		3	–	0	–	0
Bergstrom Field		–		3	–	4	–	0
Ottumwa NAS		–		3	–	4	–	0
Camp Lee		–		3	–	5	–	0
Cherry Point Marines		–		3	–	6	–	0
Chatham Field		–		2	–	8	–	1
Sampton NTS		–		2	–	7	–	0
Miami NTC		–		2	–	8	–	0
Bryan AAF		–		1	–	7	–	0
Fairfield-Suisun AAB		–		1	–	7	–	0
Richmond AAB		–		0	–	10	–	1
Camp Ellis		–		0	–	5	–	0
South Plains AAF		–		0	–	8	–	0
Rankings from AP Poll

The 1944 Amarillo Army Air Field Sky Giants football team represented the United States Army Air Forces's Amarillo Army Air Field (Amarillo AAF) near Amarillo, Texas during the 1944 college football season. Led by first-year head coach Dan Salkeld, the Sky Giants compiled a record of 5–3. Steve Sebo was the team's backfield coach. Amarillo AAF's roster included Al Coppage and Bob Jauron.

In the final Litkenhous Ratings, Amarillo AAF ranked 37th among the nation's college and service teams and seventh out of 63 United States Army teams with a rating of 94.3.

== Schedule ==
Date	Time	Opponent	Site	Result	Attendance	Source
September 16	9:00 p.m.	at New Mexico	Hilltop Stadium; Albuquerque, NM	W 21–2	6,000	
September 24		at South Plains AAF	Tech Field; Lubbock, TX	cancelled		
September 30	8:15 p.m.	at Lubbock AAF	Tech Field; Lubbock, TX	W 19–0		
October 7	8:00 p.m.	Lubbock AAF	Butler Field; Amarillo, TX	W 31–0		
October 14	8:00 p.m.	at West Texas State	Buffalo Stadium; Canyon, TX	W 38–7		
October 21	8:00 p.m.	Norman NAS	Butler Field; Amarillo, TX	L 13–19		
October 28	8:00 p.m.	South Plains AAF	Butler Field; Amarillo, TX	W 53–13		
November 5		at Second Air Force	Penrose Stadium; Colorado Springs, CO	L 6–46	6,000	
November 26		at No. 4 Randolph Field	Farrington Field; Fort Worth, TX	L 0–33	11,000	
Rankings from AP Poll released prior to the game; All times are in Central time
