= 1944 Camp Peary Pirates football team =

American college football season

1944 Camp Peary Pirates football
- Conference: Independent
- Record: 5–2
- Head coach: Red Strader

1944 military service football records
	Conf.			Overall
Team	W	L	T	W		L		T
No. 3 Randolph Field		–		11	–	0	–	0
No. 5 Bainbridge		–		10	–	0	–	0
No. 18 Fort Pierce		–		9	–	0	–	0
No. T–13 Norman NAS		–		6	–	0	–	0
No. 6 Iowa Pre-Flight		–		10	–	1	–	0
No. 16 El Toro Marines		–		8	–	1	–	0
Hondo AAF		–		7	–	1	–	0
Bunker Hill NAS		–		6	–	1	–	0
Lincoln AAF		–		6	–	1	–	0
Blackland AAF		–		7	–	1	–	1
Keesler Field		–		8	–	1	–	2
No. 17 Great Lakes Navy		–		9	–	2	–	1
No. 10 March Field		–		7	–	2	–	2
Third Air Force		–		8	–	3	–	0
North Carolina Pre-Flight		–		6	–	2	–	1
Atlantic City NAS		–		5	–	2	–	0
Camp Peary		–		5	–	2	–	0
Tonopah AAF		–		5	–	2	–	0
Daniel Field		–		7	–	3	–	0
No. 20 Second Air Force		–		10	–	4	–	1
San Francisco Coast Guard		–		4	–	2	–	1
Ellington Field		–		6	–	3	–	2
Amarillo AAF		–		5	–	3	–	0
Alameda Coast Guard		–		4	–	2	–	2
Coronado Amphibious		–		2	–	1	–	1
Olathe NAS		–		4	–	2	–	2
Selman Field		–		4	–	2	–	2
Galveston AAF		–		5	–	3	–	2
Fleet City		–		6	–	4	–	1
Jacksonville NAS		–		4	–	3	–	0
San Diego NTS		–		4	–	3	–	1
Camp Beale		–		5	–	4	–	0
Lubbock AAF		–		5	–	4	–	0
Fort Warren		–		5	–	4	–	1
Fort Monroe		–		5	–	5	–	0
Klamath Falls Marines		–		2	–	2	–	1
Maxwell Field		–		5	–	5	–	0
Minter Field		–		3	–	3	–	0
No. 19 Saint Mary's Pre-Flight		–		4	–	4	–	0
Fourth Infantry		–		3	–	4	–	2
Georgia Pre-Flight		–		4	–	5	–	0
Third Infantry		–		4	–	5	–	0
Melville PT Boats		–		3	–	0	–	0
Bergstrom Field		–		3	–	4	–	0
Ottumwa NAS		–		3	–	4	–	0
Camp Lee		–		3	–	5	–	0
Cherry Point Marines		–		3	–	6	–	0
Chatham Field		–		2	–	8	–	1
Sampton NTS		–		2	–	7	–	0
Miami NTC		–		2	–	8	–	0
Bryan AAF		–		1	–	7	–	0
Fairfield-Suisun AAB		–		1	–	7	–	0
Richmond AAB		–		0	–	10	–	1
Camp Ellis		–		0	–	5	–	0
South Plains AAF		–		0	–	8	–	0
Rankings from AP Poll

The 1944 Camp Peary Pirates football team represented Camp Peary during the 1944 college football season. The team compiled a 5–2 record. Red Strader, who was coach of the Saint Mary's Gaels football team before the war, was the head coach.

The team garnered attention when, shortly before the season began, the Navy assigned eight former NFL players to Camp Peary. The eight included halfbacks Joe Vodicka, Andy Uram, Len Janiak, and Bob Morrow, fullback Joe Bokant, center Al Matuza, and tackle Bob Bjorklund. Other notable players on the team included ends Ralph Schilling and Gregg Browning and tackle Russ Letlow who was later named to the NFL 1930s All-Decade Team.

The Richmond Army Air Base Thunderbyrds originally scheduled two games with Camp Peary, on September 23 and October 29, but cancelled those games in early September.

In the final Litkenhous Ratings, March Field ranked 39th among the nation's college and service teams and eighth out of 63 United States Army teams with a rating of 94.2.

== Schedule ==
Date	Opponent	Rank	Site	Result	Attendance	Source
September 24	Washington Redskins rookies		Williamsburg, VA	W 33–27	12,500	
September 30	at Cherry Point Marines		Cherry Point, NC	W 20–0		
October 8	vs. Camp Lee		Cary Field; Williamsburg, VA	W 38–0	10,000	
October 14	Camp Lejeune			Cancelled		
October 22	No. 18 Bainbridge		Williamsburg, VA	L 0–7		
October 29	at Richmond AAB			Cancelled		
November 5	at Camp Lee		Camp Lee, GA	W 41–0		
November 12	Fort Monroe			Cancelled		
November 18	at North Carolina Pre-Flight		Kenan Memorial Stadium; Chapel Hill, NC	W 19–7		
November 25	at No. 5 Bainbridge	No. 14	Tome Field; Bainbridge, MD	L 13–21	13,000	
Rankings from AP Poll released prior to the game

== Rankings ==
Ranking movements Legend: ██ Increase in ranking ██ Decrease in ranking — = Not ranked
	Week								
Poll	1	2	3	4	5	6	7	8	Final
AP	—	—	—	—	—	—	14	17	—
