= 1944 Fresno State Bulldogs football team =

American college football season

1944 Fresno State Bulldogs football
- Conference: Independent
- Record: 0–6
- Head coach: Earl Wight (1st season)
- Home stadium: Ratcliffe Stadium

1944 Western college football independents records
	Conf.			Overall
Team	W	L	T	W		L		T
Nevada		–		4	–	4	–	0
Idaho Southern Branch		–		4	–	5	–	0
Pacific (CA)		–		3	–	8	–	0
Saint Mary's		–		0	–	5	–	0
Fresno State		–		0	–	6	–	0

The 1944 Fresno State Bulldogs football team represented Fresno State Normal School—now known as California State University, Fresno—as an independent during the 1944 college football season. Fresno State had been a member of the California Collegiate Athletic Association (CCAA) in 1941, but the conference suspended operations during World War II. Since many colleges did not field a team in 1944, the Bulldogs played primarily against junior colleges and military teams. Led by first-year head coach Earl Wight, the Bulldogs compiled a record of 0–6 and were outscored 95 to 18 for the season. Fresno State played home games at Ratcliffe Stadium on the campus of Fresno City College in Fresno, California.

== Schedule ==
Date	Time	Opponent	Site	Result	Attendance	Source
October 21	10:00 a.m.	at Minter Field	Minter Athletic Field; Bakersfield, CA	L 0–20		
October 28		at Salinas	Salinas JC Stadium; Salinas, CA	L 6–13		
November 3		at Modesto	Modesto Junior College Stadium; Modesto, CA	L 0–28		
November 11		Minter Field	Ratcliffe Stadium; Fresno, CA	L 0–13	300	
November 18	8:00 p.m.	Tonopah AAF	Ratcliffe Stadium; Fresno, CA	L 6–7	1,500	
November 23		Pacific (CA)	Ratcliffe Stadium; Fresno, CA	L 6–14	4,500	
All times are in Pacific time

== Team players in the NFL ==
The following Fresno State Bulldog players were selected in the 1945 NFL draft.

Player	Position	Round	Overall	NFL Team
Louie Futrell	Back	7	57	Boston Yanks
