= 1944 Galveston Army Air Field Islanders football team =

American college football season

1944 Galveston Army Air Field Islanders football
- Conference: Independent
- Record: 5–3–2
- Head coach: Jim Thomas (1st season)
- Home stadium: School Park

1944 military service football records
	Conf.			Overall
Team	W	L	T	W		L		T
No. 3 Randolph Field		–		11	–	0	–	0
No. 5 Bainbridge		–		10	–	0	–	0
No. 18 Fort Pierce		–		9	–	0	–	0
No. T–13 Norman NAS		–		6	–	0	–	0
No. 6 Iowa Pre-Flight		–		10	–	1	–	0
No. 16 El Toro Marines		–		8	–	1	–	0
Hondo AAF		–		7	–	1	–	0
Bunker Hill NAS		–		6	–	1	–	0
Lincoln AAF		–		6	–	1	–	0
Blackland AAF		–		7	–	1	–	1
Keesler Field		–		8	–	1	–	2
No. 17 Great Lakes Navy		–		9	–	2	–	1
No. 10 March Field		–		7	–	2	–	2
Third Air Force		–		8	–	3	–	0
North Carolina Pre-Flight		–		6	–	2	–	1
Atlantic City NAS		–		5	–	2	–	0
Camp Peary		–		5	–	2	–	0
Tonopah AAF		–		5	–	2	–	0
Daniel Field		–		7	–	3	–	0
No. 20 Second Air Force		–		10	–	4	–	1
San Francisco Coast Guard		–		4	–	2	–	1
Ellington Field		–		6	–	3	–	2
Amarillo AAF		–		5	–	3	–	0
Alameda Coast Guard		–		4	–	2	–	2
Coronado Amphibious		–		2	–	1	–	1
Olathe NAS		–		4	–	2	–	2
Selman Field		–		4	–	2	–	2
Galveston AAF		–		5	–	3	–	2
Fleet City		–		6	–	4	–	1
Jacksonville NAS		–		4	–	3	–	0
San Diego NTS		–		4	–	3	–	1
Camp Beale		–		5	–	4	–	0
Lubbock AAF		–		5	–	4	–	0
Fort Warren		–		5	–	4	–	1
Fort Monroe		–		5	–	5	–	0
Klamath Falls Marines		–		2	–	2	–	1
Maxwell Field		–		5	–	5	–	0
Minter Field		–		3	–	3	–	0
No. 19 Saint Mary's Pre-Flight		–		4	–	4	–	0
Fourth Infantry		–		3	–	4	–	2
Georgia Pre-Flight		–		4	–	5	–	0
Third Infantry		–		4	–	5	–	0
Melville PT Boats		–		3	–	0	–	0
Bergstrom Field		–		3	–	4	–	0
Ottumwa NAS		–		3	–	4	–	0
Camp Lee		–		3	–	5	–	0
Cherry Point Marines		–		3	–	6	–	0
Chatham Field		–		2	–	8	–	1
Sampton NTS		–		2	–	7	–	0
Miami NTC		–		2	–	8	–	0
Bryan AAF		–		1	–	7	–	0
Fairfield-Suisun AAB		–		1	–	7	–	0
Richmond AAB		–		0	–	10	–	1
Camp Ellis		–		0	–	5	–	0
South Plains AAF		–		0	–	8	–	0
Rankings from AP Poll

The 1944 Galveston Army Air Field Islanders football team, also called the "Bombers", "Flyers", and "Hurricanes", represented the United States Army Air Force's Galveston Army Air Field (Galveston AAF), located near Galveston, Texas, during the 1944 college football season. Led by head coach Jim Thomas, the Islanders compiled a record of 5–3–2. The team's roster included Vince DiFrancesca. Thomas had played college football at Birmingham–Southern College and coached high school football in Georgiana, Alabama.

In the final Litkenhous Ratings, Hondo AAF ranked 140th among the nation's college and service teams and 24th out of 63 United States Army teams with a rating of 59.8.

== Schedule ==
Date	Opponent	Site	Result	Attendance	Source
September 17	Southwestern (TX)	Galveston, TX	L 6–32		
September 23	at Rice	Rice Field; Houston, TX	L 0–57	12,000	
September 30	Ellington Field	Galveston, TX	T 0–0		
October 8	Keesler Field	Biloxi, MS	cancelled		
October 14	Bryan AAF	Galveston, TX	W 19–0		
October 21	at Selman Field	Brown Stadium; Monroe, LA	T 0–0		
October 28	John Tarleton	School Park; Galveston, TX	W 40–0	2,000	
November 6	Texas A&M reserves	Galveston, TX	W 14–2		
November 11	Hondo AAF	Galveston, TX	W 19–14		
November 18	Lake Charles AAF	Galveston, TX	W 20–0		
November 25	Selman Field	Galveston, TX	L 14–29		
