= 1944 March Field Flyers football team =

American college football season

1944 March Field Flyers football
- Conference: Independent

Ranking
- AP: No. 10
- Record: 7–2–2
- Head coach: Paul J. Schissler (3rd season)
- Home stadium: Wheelock Field

1944 military service football records
	Conf.			Overall
Team	W	L	T	W		L		T
No. 3 Randolph Field		–		11	–	0	–	0
No. 5 Bainbridge		–		10	–	0	–	0
No. 18 Fort Pierce		–		9	–	0	–	0
No. T–13 Norman NAS		–		6	–	0	–	0
No. 6 Iowa Pre-Flight		–		10	–	1	–	0
No. 16 El Toro Marines		–		8	–	1	–	0
Hondo AAF		–		7	–	1	–	0
Bunker Hill NAS		–		6	–	1	–	0
Lincoln AAF		–		6	–	1	–	0
Blackland AAF		–		7	–	1	–	1
Keesler Field		–		8	–	1	–	2
No. 17 Great Lakes Navy		–		9	–	2	–	1
No. 10 March Field		–		7	–	2	–	2
Third Air Force		–		8	–	3	–	0
North Carolina Pre-Flight		–		6	–	2	–	1
Atlantic City NAS		–		5	–	2	–	0
Camp Peary		–		5	–	2	–	0
Tonopah AAF		–		5	–	2	–	0
Daniel Field		–		7	–	3	–	0
No. 20 Second Air Force		–		10	–	4	–	1
San Francisco Coast Guard		–		4	–	2	–	1
Ellington Field		–		6	–	3	–	2
Amarillo AAF		–		5	–	3	–	0
Alameda Coast Guard		–		4	–	2	–	2
Coronado Amphibious		–		2	–	1	–	1
Olathe NAS		–		4	–	2	–	2
Selman Field		–		4	–	2	–	2
Galveston AAF		–		5	–	3	–	2
Fleet City		–		6	–	4	–	1
Jacksonville NAS		–		4	–	3	–	0
San Diego NTS		–		4	–	3	–	1
Camp Beale		–		5	–	4	–	0
Lubbock AAF		–		5	–	4	–	0
Fort Warren		–		5	–	4	–	1
Fort Monroe		–		5	–	5	–	0
Klamath Falls Marines		–		2	–	2	–	1
Maxwell Field		–		5	–	5	–	0
Minter Field		–		3	–	3	–	0
No. 19 Saint Mary's Pre-Flight		–		4	–	4	–	0
Fourth Infantry		–		3	–	4	–	2
Georgia Pre-Flight		–		4	–	5	–	0
Third Infantry		–		4	–	5	–	0
Melville PT Boats		–		3	–	0	–	0
Bergstrom Field		–		3	–	4	–	0
Ottumwa NAS		–		3	–	4	–	0
Camp Lee		–		3	–	5	–	0
Cherry Point Marines		–		3	–	6	–	0
Chatham Field		–		2	–	8	–	1
Sampton NTS		–		2	–	7	–	0
Miami NTC		–		2	–	8	–	0
Bryan AAF		–		1	–	7	–	0
Fairfield-Suisun AAB		–		1	–	7	–	0
Richmond AAB		–		0	–	10	–	1
Camp Ellis		–		0	–	5	–	0
South Plains AAF		–		0	–	8	–	0
Rankings from AP Poll

The 1944 March Field Flyers football team represented the United States Army Air Forces' Fourth Air Force stationed at March Field during the 1944 college football season. The base was located in Riverside, California. The team compiled a 7–2–2 record, outscored all opponents by a total of 222 to 81, and was ranked No. 10 in the final AP poll.

In individual games of note, the Flyers defeated UCLA, Washington, and the San Diego Bombers, champions of Pacific Coast Professional Football League. Their losses were to the Washington Redskins of the NFL and the Randolph Field team that was ranked No. 3 in the final AP Poll.

The team was coached by Major Paul J. Schissler, a former NFL coach.

In the final Litkenhous Ratings, March Field ranked 16th among the nation's college and service teams and third out of 63 United States Army teams with a rating of 104.5.

== Schedule ==
Date	Opponent	Rank	Site	Result	Attendance	Source
August 25	vs. Washington Redskins		Los Angeles Memorial Coliseum; Los Angeles, CA	L 3–7	55,000	
September 24	at San Diego Bombers		San Diego, CA	W 56–7		
October 7	Fleet City		Wheelock Field; Riverside, CA	W 39–0		
October 15	at Alameda Coast Guard		Kezar Stadium; San Francisco, CA	T 20–20	22,000	
October 22	El Toro Marines	No. 14	Wheelock Field; Riverside, CA	W 20–14	16,000	
October 29	at Saint Mary's Pre-Flight	No. 11	Kezar Stadium; San Francisco, CA	W 7–0		
November 4	UCLA	No. 11	Wheelock Field; Riverside, CA	W 35–13	12,000	
November 11	at Washington	No. 9	Husky Stadium; Seattle, WA	W 28–0	21,000	
November 19	at San Diego NTS	No. 8	San Diego, CA	W 7–0	5,500	
November 26	at Second Air Force	No. 9	Denver, CO	T 0–0	12,000	
December 10	vs. No. 3 Randolph Field	No. 14	Los Angeles Memorial Coliseum; Los Angeles, CA	L 7–20	50,000	
Rankings from AP Poll released prior to the game

== Rankings ==
Ranking movements Legend: ██ Increase in ranking ██ Decrease in ranking — = Not ranked ( ) = First-place votes
	Week								
Poll	1	2	3	4	5	6	7	8	Final
AP	—	14 (1)	11	11 (6)	9 (3)	8 (2)	9 (3)	14	10
