= 1944 Saint Mary's Gaels football team =

American college football season

1944 Saint Mary's Gaels football
- Conference: Independent
- Record: 0–5
- Head coach: James Phelan (3rd season)
- Home stadium: Kezar Stadium

1944 Western college football independents records
	Conf.			Overall
Team	W	L	T	W		L		T
Nevada		–		4	–	4	–	0
Idaho Southern Branch		–		4	–	5	–	0
Pacific (CA)		–		3	–	8	–	0
Saint Mary's		–		0	–	5	–	0
Fresno State		–		0	–	6	–	0

The 1944 Saint Mary's Gaels football team was an American football team that represented Saint Mary's College of California during the 1944 college football season. In their third season under head coach James Phelan, the Gaels compiled a 0–5 record and were outscored by opponents by a combined total of 148 to 14.

== Schedule ==
Date	Opponent	Site	Result	Attendance	Source
September 23	at California	California Memorial Stadium; Berkeley, CA	L 7–31	30,000	
October 7	Alameda Coast Guard	Kezar Stadium; San Francisco, CA	L 0–18	12,000	
October 14	at UCLA	Los Angeles Memorial Coliseum; Los Angeles, CA	L 0–39	1,713	
October 28	at USC	Los Angeles Memorial Coliseum; Los Angeles, CA	L 7–34	20,000	
November 5	at Fleet City	Forster Field; Shoemaker, CA	L 0–26		
