= 1944 USC Trojans football team =

American college football season

1944 USC Trojans football

PCC champion Rose Bowl champion

Rose Bowl, W 25–0 vs. Tennessee
- Conference: Pacific Coast Conference

Ranking
- AP: No. 7
- Record: 8–0–2 (3–0–2 PCC)
- Head coach: Jeff Cravath (3rd season)
- Home stadium: Los Angeles Memorial Coliseum

1944 Pacific Coast Conference football standings
	Conf.					Overall
Team	W		L		T	W		L		T
No. 7 USC $	3	–	0	–	2	8	–	0	–	2
Washington	1	–	1	–	0	5	–	3	–	0
UCLA	1	–	2	–	1	4	–	5	–	1
California	1	–	3	–	1	3	–	6	–	1
$ – Conference champion; Rankings from AP Poll

The 1944 USC Trojans football team represented the University of Southern California (USC) in the 1944 college football season. In their third year under head coach Jeff Cravath, the Trojans compiled an 8–0–2 record (3–0–2 against conference opponents), won the Pacific Coast Conference championship, defeated Tennessee in the 1945 Rose Bowl, and outscored their opponents by a combined total of 240 to 73.

== Schedule ==
Date	Opponent	Rank	Site	Result	Attendance	Source
September 23	UCLA		Los Angeles Memorial Coliseum; Los Angeles, CA (Victory Bell)	T 13–13	60,000	
September 30	Pacific (CA)*		Los Angeles Memorial Coliseum; Los Angeles, CA	W 18–6	32,000	
October 7	California		Los Angeles Memorial Coliseum; Los Angeles, CA	T 6–6	40,000	
October 14	vs. Saint Mary's Pre-Flight*		Ratcliffe Stadium; Fresno, CA	W 6–0	13,500	
October 23	Washington	No. 15	Los Angeles Memorial Coliseum; Los Angeles, CA	W 38–7	70,000	
October 28	Saint Mary's		Los Angeles Memorial Coliseum; Los Angeles, CA	W 34–7	15,000	
November 4	San Diego NTS*	No. 13	Los Angeles Memorial Coliseum; Los Angeles, CA	W 28–21	28,000	
November 18	at California	No. 12	California Memorial Stadium; Berkeley, CA	W 32–0	40,000	
November 25	at UCLA^{†}	No. 8	Los Angeles Memorial Coliseum; Los Angeles, CA (Victory Bell)	W 40–13	77,903	
January 1, 1945	vs. No. 12 Tennessee*	No. 7	Rose Bowl; Pasadena, CA (Rose Bowl)	W 25–0	91,000	
*Non-conference game; ^{†}Homecoming; Rankings from AP Poll released prior to the game; Source:

== Rankings ==
Ranking movements Legend: ██ Increase in ranking ██ Decrease in ranking — = Not ranked т = Tied with team above or below ( ) = First-place votes
	Week								
Poll	1	2	3	4	5	6	7	8	Final
AP	—	15т	—	13	11	12	8 (1)	7	7
