= 1944 Fleet City Bluejackets football team =

American college football season

1944 Fleet City Bluejackets football
- Conference: Independent
- Record: 6–4–1
- Head coach: Jack Malevich (1st season)
- Home stadium: Forster Field

1944 military service football records
	Conf.			Overall
Team	W	L	T	W		L		T
No. 3 Randolph Field		–		11	–	0	–	0
No. 5 Bainbridge		–		10	–	0	–	0
No. 18 Fort Pierce		–		9	–	0	–	0
No. T–13 Norman NAS		–		6	–	0	–	0
No. 6 Iowa Pre-Flight		–		10	–	1	–	0
No. 16 El Toro Marines		–		8	–	1	–	0
Hondo AAF		–		7	–	1	–	0
Bunker Hill NAS		–		6	–	1	–	0
Lincoln AAF		–		6	–	1	–	0
Blackland AAF		–		7	–	1	–	1
Keesler Field		–		8	–	1	–	2
No. 17 Great Lakes Navy		–		9	–	2	–	1
No. 10 March Field		–		7	–	2	–	2
Third Air Force		–		8	–	3	–	0
North Carolina Pre-Flight		–		6	–	2	–	1
Atlantic City NAS		–		5	–	2	–	0
Camp Peary		–		5	–	2	–	0
Tonopah AAF		–		5	–	2	–	0
Daniel Field		–		7	–	3	–	0
No. 20 Second Air Force		–		10	–	4	–	1
San Francisco Coast Guard		–		4	–	2	–	1
Ellington Field		–		6	–	3	–	2
Amarillo AAF		–		5	–	3	–	0
Alameda Coast Guard		–		4	–	2	–	2
Coronado Amphibious		–		2	–	1	–	1
Olathe NAS		–		4	–	2	–	2
Selman Field		–		4	–	2	–	2
Galveston AAF		–		5	–	3	–	2
Fleet City		–		6	–	4	–	1
Jacksonville NAS		–		4	–	3	–	0
San Diego NTS		–		4	–	3	–	1
Camp Beale		–		5	–	4	–	0
Lubbock AAF		–		5	–	4	–	0
Fort Warren		–		5	–	4	–	1
Fort Monroe		–		5	–	5	–	0
Klamath Falls Marines		–		2	–	2	–	1
Maxwell Field		–		5	–	5	–	0
Minter Field		–		3	–	3	–	0
No. 19 Saint Mary's Pre-Flight		–		4	–	4	–	0
Fourth Infantry		–		3	–	4	–	2
Georgia Pre-Flight		–		4	–	5	–	0
Third Infantry		–		4	–	5	–	0
Melville PT Boats		–		3	–	0	–	0
Bergstrom Field		–		3	–	4	–	0
Ottumwa NAS		–		3	–	4	–	0
Camp Lee		–		3	–	5	–	0
Cherry Point Marines		–		3	–	6	–	0
Chatham Field		–		2	–	8	–	1
Sampton NTS		–		2	–	7	–	0
Miami NTC		–		2	–	8	–	0
Bryan AAF		–		1	–	7	–	0
Fairfield-Suisun AAB		–		1	–	7	–	0
Richmond AAB		–		0	–	10	–	1
Camp Ellis		–		0	–	5	–	0
South Plains AAF		–		0	–	8	–	0
Rankings from AP Poll

The 1944 Fleet City Bluejackets football team was an American football team during the 1944 season. The Bluejackets represented the United States Navy's "Fleet City" facilities located near Dublin, California, which included Camp Parks, Camp Shoemaker, the Receiving Barracks, and a Navy Hospital. The team compiled a 6–4–1 record.

The 1944 Fleet City team was coached by Jack Malevich, who played college football at Catholic University in the 1920s. Tracey Kellow, who played for the 1935 TCU team that won the Sugar Bowl, was an assistant coach.

The team played its home games at Forster Field, named in honor of base commander O. N. Forster, who was described as a "rabid fan" of the team.

Key players included Pro Football Hall of Famer Joe Stydahar, College Football Hall of Famer Bob Suffridge, future Baltimore Colts lineman Sisto Averno, pro quarterback "Chuckin' Charlie" O'Rourke, and halfback Bill Schroeder, a future NFL player.

In the final Litkenhous Ratings, Fleet City ranked 54th among the nation's college and service teams and 12th out of 28 United States Navy teams with a rating of 85.5.

== Schedule ==
Date	Opponent	Site	Result	Attendance	Source
September 8	at Pacific (CA)	Baxter Stadium; Stockton, CA	W 7–6		
September 16	El Toro Marines	Forster Field; Shoemaker, CA	L 7–13	6,000	
September 24	vs. Alameda Coast Guard	Kezar Stadium; San Francisco, CA	T 7–7	15,000	
October 1	Saint Mary's Pre-Flight	Forster Field; Shoemaker, CA	W 12–0	10,000	
October 7	at March Field	Wheelock Field; Riverside, CA	L 0–39		
October 14	San Francisco Coast Guard Pilots	Forster Field; Shoemaker, CA	W 27–6	10,000	
October 21	at No. 12 California	California Memorial Stadium; Berkeley, CA	W 19–2		
October 28	at El Toro Marines	Municipal Bowl; Santa Ana, CA	L 0–14	8,000	
November 5	Saint Mary's	Forster Field; Shoemaker, CA	W 26–0		
November 11	at Nevada	Mackay Stadium; Reno, NV	W 19–2		
November 19	at Saint Mary's Pre-Flight	Moraga, CA	L 0–3	3,000	
Rankings from AP Poll released prior to the game
