= John Giannoni =

American football player (1914–)

No. 19, 23, 14
- Position: End

Personal information
- Born: August 27, 1914; Sacramento, California, U.S.
- Died: May 24, 2000 (aged 85); Sacramento, California, U.S.
- Listed height: 6 ft 1 in (1.85 m)
- Listed weight: 210 lb (95 kg)

Career information
- High school: Sacramento
- College: Saint Mary's (1933–1937)
- NFL draft: 1938: undrafted

Career history
- Cleveland Rams (1938); Fresno Wine Crushers (1938)
- Stats at Pro Football Reference

John Michael Giannoni (August 27, 1914 – May 24, 2000) was an American professional football end who played for the Cleveland Rams of the National Football League (NFL). He played college football and basketball for the Saint Mary's Gaels.

== Early life ==
John Michael Giannoni was born on August 27, 1914, in Sacramento, California. He played football and basketball at Sacramento High School.

== College career ==
Giannoni enrolled at Saint Mary's College of California to play college football for the Gaels. He was on the freshman team in 1933 and the varsity team from 1934 to 1937. He also played college basketball for the Gaels.

== Professional career ==
Giannoni played in three games for the Cleveland Rams in 1938 as a reserve end before suffering a separated shoulder during practice. He was released on October 11, 1938. He finished the 1938 season by starting in four games with the Fresno Wine Crushers of the California Football League.

== Post-playing career ==
Giannoni served in the United States Army during World War II. He was a player-coach for the 1944 Fairfield-Suisun Army Air Base Skymasters football team. He was the head football coach at Lodi High School in Lodi, California for many years, and led them to three undefeated seasons. Giannoni was inducted into the National Football Foundation of America Hall of Fame, St. Mary's College Hall of Fame, Lodi Sports Hall of Fame, and Sacramento Sports Hall of Fame. He died on May 24, 2000, in Sacramento due to kidney failure.
