= 1944 Atlantic City Naval Air Station Corsairs football team =

American college football season

1944 Atlantic City Naval Air Station Corsairs football
- Conference: Independent
- Record: 5–2
- Head coach: Lew Elverson (2nd season)
- Home stadium: Ansley Park

1944 military service football records
	Conf.			Overall
Team	W	L	T	W		L		T
No. 3 Randolph Field		–		11	–	0	–	0
No. 5 Bainbridge		–		10	–	0	–	0
No. 18 Fort Pierce		–		9	–	0	–	0
No. T–13 Norman NAS		–		6	–	0	–	0
No. 6 Iowa Pre-Flight		–		10	–	1	–	0
No. 16 El Toro Marines		–		8	–	1	–	0
Hondo AAF		–		7	–	1	–	0
Bunker Hill NAS		–		6	–	1	–	0
Lincoln AAF		–		6	–	1	–	0
Blackland AAF		–		7	–	1	–	1
Keesler Field		–		8	–	1	–	2
No. 17 Great Lakes Navy		–		9	–	2	–	1
No. 10 March Field		–		7	–	2	–	2
Third Air Force		–		8	–	3	–	0
North Carolina Pre-Flight		–		6	–	2	–	1
Atlantic City NAS		–		5	–	2	–	0
Camp Peary		–		5	–	2	–	0
Tonopah AAF		–		5	–	2	–	0
Daniel Field		–		7	–	3	–	0
No. 20 Second Air Force		–		10	–	4	–	1
San Francisco Coast Guard		–		4	–	2	–	1
Ellington Field		–		6	–	3	–	2
Amarillo AAF		–		5	–	3	–	0
Alameda Coast Guard		–		4	–	2	–	2
Coronado Amphibious		–		2	–	1	–	1
Olathe NAS		–		4	–	2	–	2
Selman Field		–		4	–	2	–	2
Galveston AAF		–		5	–	3	–	2
Fleet City		–		6	–	4	–	1
Jacksonville NAS		–		4	–	3	–	0
San Diego NTS		–		4	–	3	–	1
Camp Beale		–		5	–	4	–	0
Lubbock AAF		–		5	–	4	–	0
Fort Warren		–		5	–	4	–	1
Fort Monroe		–		5	–	5	–	0
Klamath Falls Marines		–		2	–	2	–	1
Maxwell Field		–		5	–	5	–	0
Minter Field		–		3	–	3	–	0
No. 19 Saint Mary's Pre-Flight		–		4	–	4	–	0
Fourth Infantry		–		3	–	4	–	2
Georgia Pre-Flight		–		4	–	5	–	0
Third Infantry		–		4	–	5	–	0
Melville PT Boats		–		3	–	0	–	0
Bergstrom Field		–		3	–	4	–	0
Ottumwa NAS		–		3	–	4	–	0
Camp Lee		–		3	–	5	–	0
Cherry Point Marines		–		3	–	6	–	0
Chatham Field		–		2	–	8	–	1
Sampton NTS		–		2	–	7	–	0
Miami NTC		–		2	–	8	–	0
Bryan AAF		–		1	–	7	–	0
Fairfield-Suisun AAB		–		1	–	7	–	0
Richmond AAB		–		0	–	10	–	1
Camp Ellis		–		0	–	5	–	0
South Plains AAF		–		0	–	8	–	0
Rankings from AP Poll

The 1944 Atlantic City Naval Air Station Corsairs football team, also called the "Hellcats", "Sailors", and "Tars", represented the United States Navy's Atlantic City Naval Air Station (Atlantic City NAS), located in Pomona, New Jersey, during the 1944 college football season. Led by second-year head coach Lew Elverson, the Corsairs compiled a record of 5–2. Lieutenants Jim Morgan and Sam Hammerstrom were assistant coaches for the team.

In the final Litkenhous Ratings, Atlantic City NAS ranked 125th among the nation's college and service teams and 17th out of 28 United States Navy teams with a rating of 62.6.

== Schedule ==
Date	Time	Opponent	Site	Result	Attendance	Source
September 23	2:30 p.m.	at Swarthmore	Garnet Alumni Field; Swarthmore, PA	W 3–0		
October 7		at Ursinus	Collegeville, PA	W 45–7		
October 14	2:30 p.m.	at Scranton	Scranton Stadium; Scranton, PA	W 21–7	1,000	
October 21	2:00 p.m.	Army JV	Ansley Park; Pleasantville, NJ	L 2–12		
November 4	2:30 p.m.	at Muhlenberg	Muhlenberg Field; Allentown, PA	L 7–14		
November 10	8:45 p.m.	at Villanova	Shibe Park; Philadelphia, PA	W 25–6	5,000	
November 25		at Princeton	Palmer Stadium; Princeton, NJ	W 31–6		
All times are in Eastern time
