= 1944 Randolph Field Ramblers football team =

American college football season

1944 Randolph Field Ramblers football

Treasury Bond Bowl, W 13–6 vs. Second Air Force
- Conference: Independent

Ranking
- AP: No. 3
- Record: 11–0
- Head coach: Frank Tritico (2nd season)
- Home stadium: Grater Field, Alamo Stadium

1944 military service football records
	Conf.			Overall
Team	W	L	T	W		L		T
No. 3 Randolph Field		–		11	–	0	–	0
No. 5 Bainbridge		–		10	–	0	–	0
No. 18 Fort Pierce		–		9	–	0	–	0
No. T–13 Norman NAS		–		6	–	0	–	0
No. 6 Iowa Pre-Flight		–		10	–	1	–	0
No. 16 El Toro Marines		–		8	–	1	–	0
Hondo AAF		–		7	–	1	–	0
Bunker Hill NAS		–		6	–	1	–	0
Lincoln AAF		–		6	–	1	–	0
Blackland AAF		–		7	–	1	–	1
Keesler Field		–		8	–	1	–	2
No. 17 Great Lakes Navy		–		9	–	2	–	1
No. 10 March Field		–		7	–	2	–	2
Third Air Force		–		8	–	3	–	0
North Carolina Pre-Flight		–		6	–	2	–	1
Atlantic City NAS		–		5	–	2	–	0
Camp Peary		–		5	–	2	–	0
Tonopah AAF		–		5	–	2	–	0
Daniel Field		–		7	–	3	–	0
No. 20 Second Air Force		–		10	–	4	–	1
San Francisco Coast Guard		–		4	–	2	–	1
Ellington Field		–		6	–	3	–	2
Amarillo AAF		–		5	–	3	–	0
Alameda Coast Guard		–		4	–	2	–	2
Coronado Amphibious		–		2	–	1	–	1
Olathe NAS		–		4	–	2	–	2
Selman Field		–		4	–	2	–	2
Galveston AAF		–		5	–	3	–	2
Fleet City		–		6	–	4	–	1
Jacksonville NAS		–		4	–	3	–	0
San Diego NTS		–		4	–	3	–	1
Camp Beale		–		5	–	4	–	0
Lubbock AAF		–		5	–	4	–	0
Fort Warren		–		5	–	4	–	1
Fort Monroe		–		5	–	5	–	0
Klamath Falls Marines		–		2	–	2	–	1
Maxwell Field		–		5	–	5	–	0
Minter Field		–		3	–	3	–	0
No. 19 Saint Mary's Pre-Flight		–		4	–	4	–	0
Fourth Infantry		–		3	–	4	–	2
Georgia Pre-Flight		–		4	–	5	–	0
Third Infantry		–		4	–	5	–	0
Melville PT Boats		–		3	–	0	–	0
Bergstrom Field		–		3	–	4	–	0
Ottumwa NAS		–		3	–	4	–	0
Camp Lee		–		3	–	5	–	0
Cherry Point Marines		–		3	–	6	–	0
Chatham Field		–		2	–	8	–	1
Sampton NTS		–		2	–	7	–	0
Miami NTC		–		2	–	8	–	0
Bryan AAF		–		1	–	7	–	0
Fairfield-Suisun AAB		–		1	–	7	–	0
Richmond AAB		–		0	–	10	–	1
Camp Ellis		–		0	–	5	–	0
South Plains AAF		–		0	–	8	–	0
Rankings from AP Poll

The 1944 Randolph Field Ramblers football team was an American football team represented the airmen of the United States Army Air Forces stationed at Randolph Field during the 1944 college football season. Randolph Field was located about 15 miles east-northeast of San Antonio. In their second season under head coach Frank Tritico, the Ramblers compiled a perfect 11–0 record with eight shutout victories, outscored opponents by a total of 441 to 19, and were ranked No. 3 in the final AP poll. Football statistician and historian Dr. L. H. Baker selected Randolph Field as national champions for 1944.

Players (with the positions and prior teams in parentheses) included Glenn Dobbs (back, Tulsa), Bill Dudley (back, Pittsburgh Steelers), Pete Layden (fullback, Texas), Fred Evans (back, Notre Dame), Bob Cifers (back, Tennessee), Jake Leicht (back, Oregon), Don Looney (end, Pittsburgh Steelers), Jack Russell (end, Baylor), Harold Newman (end, Alabama), Martin Ruby (tackle, Texas A&M), Walt Merrill (tackle, Alabama), Bill Bagwell (guard, Rice), Jack Freeman (guard, Texas), and Ken Holley (center, Holy Cross).

In the final Litkenhous Ratings, Randolph Field ranked second among the nation's college and service teams and first out of 63 United States Army teams with a rating of 124.2.

== Schedule ==
Date	Opponent	Rank	Site	Result	Attendance	Source
September 30	at Rice		Rice Field; Houston, TX	W 59–0	20,000	
October 7	at Texas		Memorial Stadium; Austin, TX	W 42–6	19,000	
October 14	SMU	No. 4	Alamo Stadium; San Antonio, TX	W 41–0	18,000	
October 22	vs. 7th Armored, Camp Polk	No. 3	Fort Worth, TX	W 67–0	10,000	
October 28	Third Air Force	No. 3	Alamo Stadium; San Antonio, TX	W 19–0	22,000	
November 4	North Texas Aggies	No. 4	Alamo Stadium; San Antonio, TX	W 68–0		
November 11	Maxwell Field	No. 4	Alamo Stadium; San Antonio, TX	W 25–0		
November 18	Southwestern (TX)	No. 2	Alamo Stadium; San Antonio, TX	W 54–0	652	
November 26	vs. Amarillo AAF	No. 4	Farrington Field; Fort Worth, TX	W 33–0	11,000	
December 10	vs. No. 14 March Field	No. 3	Los Angeles Memorial Coliseum; Los Angeles, CA	W 20–7	50,000	
December 16	vs. No. 20 Second Air Force	No. 3	Polo Grounds; New York, New York (Treasury Bond Bowl)	W 13–6	8,356	
Rankings from AP Poll released prior to the game

== Rankings ==
Ranking movements Legend: ██ Increase in ranking ██ Decrease in ranking т = Tied with team above or below ( ) = First-place votes
	Week								
Poll	1	2	3	4	5	6	7	8	Final
AP	4 (22)	3 (21.58)	3 (23)	4 (18)	4 (18)	2 (15)	4 (11.33)	3т (5.33)	3 (17)
