= 1944 Keesler Field Fliers football team =

American college football season

1944 Keesler Field Fliers football
- Conference: Independent
- Record: 8–1–2
- Head coach: Berl Huffman (2nd season)
- Captain: Don Gray

1944 military service football records
| | Conf. | | | Overall |
| Team | W | L | T | W | | L | | T |
|---|---|---|---|---|---|---|---|---|
| No. 3 Randolph Field | | – | | 11 | – | 0 | – | 0 |
| No. 5 Bainbridge | | – | | 10 | – | 0 | – | 0 |
| No. 18 Fort Pierce | | – | | 9 | – | 0 | – | 0 |
| No. T–13 Norman NAS | | – | | 6 | – | 0 | – | 0 |
| No. 6 Iowa Pre-Flight | | – | | 10 | – | 1 | – | 0 |
| No. 16 El Toro Marines | | – | | 8 | – | 1 | – | 0 |
| Hondo AAF | | – | | 7 | – | 1 | – | 0 |
| Bunker Hill NAS | | – | | 6 | – | 1 | – | 0 |
| Lincoln AAF | | – | | 6 | – | 1 | – | 0 |
| Blackland AAF | | – | | 7 | – | 1 | – | 1 |
| Keesler Field | | – | | 8 | – | 1 | – | 2 |
| No. 17 Great Lakes Navy | | – | | 9 | – | 2 | – | 1 |
| No. 10 March Field | | – | | 7 | – | 2 | – | 2 |
| Third Air Force | | – | | 8 | – | 3 | – | 0 |
| North Carolina Pre-Flight | | – | | 6 | – | 2 | – | 1 |
| Atlantic City NAS | | – | | 5 | – | 2 | – | 0 |
| Camp Peary | | – | | 5 | – | 2 | – | 0 |
| Tonopah AAF | | – | | 5 | – | 2 | – | 0 |
| Daniel Field | | – | | 7 | – | 3 | – | 0 |
| No. 20 Second Air Force | | – | | 10 | – | 4 | – | 1 |
| San Francisco Coast Guard | | – | | 4 | – | 2 | – | 1 |
| Ellington Field | | – | | 6 | – | 3 | – | 2 |
| Amarillo AAF | | – | | 5 | – | 3 | – | 0 |
| Alameda Coast Guard | | – | | 4 | – | 2 | – | 2 |
| Coronado Amphibious | | – | | 2 | – | 1 | – | 1 |
| Olathe NAS | | – | | 4 | – | 2 | – | 2 |
| Selman Field | | – | | 4 | – | 2 | – | 2 |
| Galveston AAF | | – | | 5 | – | 3 | – | 2 |
| Fleet City | | – | | 6 | – | 4 | – | 1 |
| Jacksonville NAS | | – | | 4 | – | 3 | – | 0 |
| San Diego NTS | | – | | 4 | – | 3 | – | 1 |
| Camp Beale | | – | | 5 | – | 4 | – | 0 |
| Lubbock AAF | | – | | 5 | – | 4 | – | 0 |
| Fort Warren | | – | | 5 | – | 4 | – | 1 |
| Fort Monroe | | – | | 5 | – | 5 | – | 0 |
| Klamath Falls Marines | | – | | 2 | – | 2 | – | 1 |
| Maxwell Field | | – | | 5 | – | 5 | – | 0 |
| Minter Field | | – | | 3 | – | 3 | – | 0 |
| No. 19 Saint Mary's Pre-Flight | | – | | 4 | – | 4 | – | 0 |
| Fourth Infantry | | – | | 3 | – | 4 | – | 2 |
| Georgia Pre-Flight | | – | | 4 | – | 5 | – | 0 |
| Third Infantry | | – | | 4 | – | 5 | – | 0 |
| Melville PT Boats | | – | | 3 | – | 0 | – | 0 |
| Bergstrom Field | | – | | 3 | – | 4 | – | 0 |
| Ottumwa NAS | | – | | 3 | – | 4 | – | 0 |
| Camp Lee | | – | | 3 | – | 5 | – | 0 |
| Cherry Point Marines | | – | | 3 | – | 6 | – | 0 |
| Chatham Field | | – | | 2 | – | 8 | – | 1 |
| Sampton NTS | | – | | 2 | – | 7 | – | 0 |
| Miami NTC | | – | | 2 | – | 8 | – | 0 |
| Bryan AAF | | – | | 1 | – | 7 | – | 0 |
| Fairfield-Suisun AAB | | – | | 1 | – | 7 | – | 0 |
| Richmond AAB | | – | | 0 | – | 10 | – | 1 |
| Camp Ellis | | – | | 0 | – | 5 | – | 0 |
| South Plains AAF | | – | | 0 | – | 8 | – | 0 |
Rankings from AP Poll

The 1944 Keesler Field Fliers football team, also called the "Commandos", represented the United States Army Air Forces's Keesler Field during the 1944 college football season. Led by second-year head coach Berl Huffman, the Fliers compiled a record of 8–1–2. The team's roster included Frank Huffman, Herm Rohrig, Jimmy Strausbaugh, and Tony Tonelli.

In the final Litkenhous Ratings, Keesler Field ranked 67th among the nation's college and service teams and tenth out of 63 United States Army teams with a rating of 82.1.

== Schedule ==
| Date | Time | Opponent | Site | Result | Attendance | Source |
|---|---|---|---|---|---|---|
| September 24 | 2:00 p.m. | Algiers NS | Biloxi, MS | W 41–0 | 10,000 | |
| September 30 | 8:30 p.m. | at Southwestern Louisiana | McNaspy Stadium; Lafayette, LA | W 13–0 | | |
| October 8 | | 142nd Mississippi Ordnance Battalion | Biloxi, MS | W 62–0 | 6,000 | |
| October 14 | 8:15 p.m. | at Selman Field | Brown Stadium; Monroe, LA | T 19–19 | 6,000 | |
| October 22 | | Gulfport AAF | Biloxi, MS | W 20–0 | | |
| October 29 | 1:00 p.m. | at Fourth Infantry | Doughboy Stadium; Fort Benning, GA | T 7–7 | 22,000 | |
| November 5 | 2:30 p.m. | Selman Field | Biloxi, MS | W 20–0 | 10,000 | |
| November 12 | | at Gulfport AAF | Gulfport Field; Gulfport, MS | W 39–0 | 6,000 | |
| November 19 | | at Algiers NS | New Orleans, LA | W 33–0 | | |
| November 27 | 2:15 p.m. | Third Infantry | Biloxi, MS | W 19–0 | 12,000 | |
| December 10 | | at No. 18 Fort Pierce | Fort Pierce, FL | L 7–34 | | |
Rankings from AP Poll released prior to the game; All times are in Central time
