= 1944 El Toro Flying Marines football team =

American college football season

1944 El Toro Flying Marines football
- Conference: Independent

Ranking
- AP: No. 16
- Record: 8–1
- Head coach: Dick Hanley (1st season)
- Home stadium: Santa Ana Municipal Bowl

1944 military service football records
| | Conf. | | | Overall |
| Team | W | L | T | W | | L | | T |
|---|---|---|---|---|---|---|---|---|
| No. 3 Randolph Field | | – | | 11 | – | 0 | – | 0 |
| No. 5 Bainbridge | | – | | 10 | – | 0 | – | 0 |
| No. 18 Fort Pierce | | – | | 9 | – | 0 | – | 0 |
| No. T–13 Norman NAS | | – | | 6 | – | 0 | – | 0 |
| No. 6 Iowa Pre-Flight | | – | | 10 | – | 1 | – | 0 |
| No. 16 El Toro Marines | | – | | 8 | – | 1 | – | 0 |
| Hondo AAF | | – | | 7 | – | 1 | – | 0 |
| Bunker Hill NAS | | – | | 6 | – | 1 | – | 0 |
| Lincoln AAF | | – | | 6 | – | 1 | – | 0 |
| Blackland AAF | | – | | 7 | – | 1 | – | 1 |
| Keesler Field | | – | | 8 | – | 1 | – | 2 |
| No. 17 Great Lakes Navy | | – | | 9 | – | 2 | – | 1 |
| No. 10 March Field | | – | | 7 | – | 2 | – | 2 |
| Third Air Force | | – | | 8 | – | 3 | – | 0 |
| North Carolina Pre-Flight | | – | | 6 | – | 2 | – | 1 |
| Atlantic City NAS | | – | | 5 | – | 2 | – | 0 |
| Camp Peary | | – | | 5 | – | 2 | – | 0 |
| Tonopah AAF | | – | | 5 | – | 2 | – | 0 |
| Daniel Field | | – | | 7 | – | 3 | – | 0 |
| No. 20 Second Air Force | | – | | 10 | – | 4 | – | 1 |
| San Francisco Coast Guard | | – | | 4 | – | 2 | – | 1 |
| Ellington Field | | – | | 6 | – | 3 | – | 2 |
| Amarillo AAF | | – | | 5 | – | 3 | – | 0 |
| Alameda Coast Guard | | – | | 4 | – | 2 | – | 2 |
| Coronado Amphibious | | – | | 2 | – | 1 | – | 1 |
| Olathe NAS | | – | | 4 | – | 2 | – | 2 |
| Selman Field | | – | | 4 | – | 2 | – | 2 |
| Galveston AAF | | – | | 5 | – | 3 | – | 2 |
| Fleet City | | – | | 6 | – | 4 | – | 1 |
| Jacksonville NAS | | – | | 4 | – | 3 | – | 0 |
| San Diego NTS | | – | | 4 | – | 3 | – | 1 |
| Camp Beale | | – | | 5 | – | 4 | – | 0 |
| Lubbock AAF | | – | | 5 | – | 4 | – | 0 |
| Fort Warren | | – | | 5 | – | 4 | – | 1 |
| Fort Monroe | | – | | 5 | – | 5 | – | 0 |
| Klamath Falls Marines | | – | | 2 | – | 2 | – | 1 |
| Maxwell Field | | – | | 5 | – | 5 | – | 0 |
| Minter Field | | – | | 3 | – | 3 | – | 0 |
| No. 19 Saint Mary's Pre-Flight | | – | | 4 | – | 4 | – | 0 |
| Fourth Infantry | | – | | 3 | – | 4 | – | 2 |
| Georgia Pre-Flight | | – | | 4 | – | 5 | – | 0 |
| Third Infantry | | – | | 4 | – | 5 | – | 0 |
| Melville PT Boats | | – | | 3 | – | 0 | – | 0 |
| Bergstrom Field | | – | | 3 | – | 4 | – | 0 |
| Ottumwa NAS | | – | | 3 | – | 4 | – | 0 |
| Camp Lee | | – | | 3 | – | 5 | – | 0 |
| Cherry Point Marines | | – | | 3 | – | 6 | – | 0 |
| Chatham Field | | – | | 2 | – | 8 | – | 1 |
| Sampton NTS | | – | | 2 | – | 7 | – | 0 |
| Miami NTC | | – | | 2 | – | 8 | – | 0 |
| Bryan AAF | | – | | 1 | – | 7 | – | 0 |
| Fairfield-Suisun AAB | | – | | 1 | – | 7 | – | 0 |
| Richmond AAB | | – | | 0 | – | 10 | – | 1 |
| Camp Ellis | | – | | 0 | – | 5 | – | 0 |
| South Plains AAF | | – | | 0 | – | 8 | – | 0 |
Rankings from AP Poll

The 1944 El Toro Flying Marines football team represented the El Toro Marine Corps Air Station during the 1944 college football season. The station was located in Orange County, California, near the town of El Toro (later renamed Lake Forest). The team compiled an 8–1 record and was ranked No. 16 in the final AP poll. Lt. Col. Dick Hanley was the team's head coach. Cliff Battles and Jim Tuttle were assistant coaches.

In the final Litkenhous Ratings, El Toro ranked 23rd among the nation's college and service teams and first out of six United States Marine Corps teams with a rating of 100.0.

== Schedule ==
| Date | Opponent | Rank | Site | Result | Attendance | Source |
|---|---|---|---|---|---|---|
| September 16 | at Fleet City | | Camp Shoemaker; Dublin, CA | W 13–7 | 6,000 | |
| September 30 | Fairfield-Suisun AAB | | Municipal Bowl; Santa Ana, CA | W 56–0 | | |
| October 7 | Beaumont General Hospital | | Municipal Bowl; Santa Ana, CA | W 52–0 | | |
| October 15 | at San Diego NTS | | San Diego, CA | W 6–0 | | |
| October 22 | at No. 14 March Field | | Wheelock Field; Riverside, CA | L 14–20 | 16,000 | |
| October 28 | Fleet City | | Municipal Bowl; Santa Ana, CA | W 14–0 | 8,000 | |
| November 11 | at Coronado Amphibious Training Base | No. 17 | Balboa Stadium; San Diego, CA | W 51–7 | | |
| November 18 | at Fort Bliss | No. 15 | El Paso, TX | W 42–0 | | |
| November 25 | vs. San Francisco Coast Guard | No. 16 | Santa Barbara, CA | W 60–0 | | |
Rankings from AP Poll released prior to the game

== Rankings ==
Ranking movements Legend: ██ Increase in ranking ██ Decrease in ranking — = Not ranked т = Tied with team above or below
| | Week | | | | | | | | |
| Poll | 1 | 2 | 3 | 4 | 5 | 6 | 7 | 8 | Final |
|---|---|---|---|---|---|---|---|---|---|
| AP | — | — | — | — | 17 | 15 | 16 | 18т | 16 |
