= Ken Holley =

American football player (1919–1986)

- Ken Holley, c. 1944

Profile
- Position: Quarterback

Personal information
- Born: October 9, 1919; Hartford, Connecticut
- Died: March 1, 1986 (aged 66); Livingston, New Jersey
- Listed height: 5 ft 10 in (1.78 m)
- Listed weight: 185 lb (84 kg)

Career information
- High school: St. John's Prep (MA)
- College: Holy Cross

Career history
- Randolph Field (1944); ATC Rockets (1945); Miami Seahawks (1946)
- Stats at Pro Football Reference

Kenneth Joseph Holley (October 9, 1919 – March 1, 1986) was an American football quarterback.

Holley was born in Hartford, Connecticut, in 1919 and attended St. John's Prep. He played college football at Holy Cross. He served in the Army during World War II and was the quarterback on the undefeated 1944 Randolph Field Ramblers football team that won the Treasury Bond Bowl and was ranked No. 3 in the final AP Poll. In 1945, he played for the ATC Rockets in the Air Force League.

After the war, Holley played professional football for the Miami Seahawks of the All-America Football Conference in 1946. He appeared in five games for the Seahawks.

He died in 1986 in Livingston, New Jersey.
