= 1944 UCLA Bruins football team =

American college football season

1944 UCLA Bruins football
- Conference: Pacific Coast Conference
- Record: 4–5–1 (1–2–1 PCC)
- Head coach: Edwin C. Horrell (6th season)
- Home stadium: Los Angeles Memorial Coliseum

1944 Pacific Coast Conference football standings
	Conf.					Overall
Team	W		L		T	W		L		T
No. 7 USC $	3	–	0	–	2	8	–	0	–	2
Washington	1	–	1	–	0	5	–	3	–	0
UCLA	1	–	2	–	1	4	–	5	–	1
California	1	–	3	–	1	3	–	6	–	1
$ – Conference champion; Rankings from AP Poll

The 1944 UCLA Bruins football team was an American football team that represented the University of California, Los Angeles during the 1944 college football season. In their sixth year under head coach Edwin C. Horrell, the Bruins compiled a 4–5–1 record (1–2–1 conference) and finished in third place in the Pacific Coast Conference.

== Schedule ==
Date	Opponent	Site	Result	Attendance	Source
September 23	at USC	Los Angeles Memorial Coliseum; Los Angeles, CA (Victory Bell)	T 13–13	60,000	
September 30	at California	California Memorial Stadium; Berkeley, CA (rivalry)	L 0–6	45,000	
October 7	at San Diego NTS*	Hull Field; San Diego, CA	L 12–14	5,000	
October 14	Saint Mary's*	Los Angeles Memorial Coliseum; Los Angeles, CA	W 39–0	20,000	
October 21	Saint Mary's Pre-Flight*	Los Angeles Memorial Coliseum; Los Angeles, CA	L 12–21	20,000	
October 27	Alameda Coast Guard*	Los Angeles Memorial Coliseum; Los Angeles, CA	W 26–13	20,000	
November 4	March Field*	Wheelock Field; Riverside, CA	L 13–35	10,000	
November 11	California	Los Angeles Memorial Coliseum; Los Angeles, CA	W 7–0	8,000	
November 18	Pacific (CA)*	Los Angeles Memorial Coliseum; Los Angeles, CA	W 54–7	15,000	
November 25	No. 8 USC	Los Angeles Memorial Coliseum; Los Angeles, CA	L 13–40	77,903	
*Non-conference game; Rankings from AP Poll released prior to the game; Source:
