= 1944 California Golden Bears football team =

American college football season

1944 California Golden Bears football
- Conference: Pacific Coast Conference
- Record: 3–6–1 (1–3–1 PCC)
- Head coach: Stub Allison (10th season)
- Home stadium: California Memorial Stadium

1944 Pacific Coast Conference football standings
	Conf.					Overall
Team	W		L		T	W		L		T
No. 7 USC $	3	–	0	–	2	8	–	0	–	2
Washington	1	–	1	–	0	5	–	3	–	0
UCLA	1	–	2	–	1	4	–	5	–	1
California	1	–	3	–	1	3	–	6	–	1
$ – Conference champion; Rankings from AP Poll

The 1944 California Golden Bears football team was an American football team that represented the University of California, Berkeley during the 1944 college football season. Under head coach Stub Allison, the team compiled an overall record of 3–6–1 and 1–3–1 in conference.

== Schedule ==
Date	Opponent	Rank	Site	Result	Attendance	Source
September 23	Saint Mary's*		California Memorial Stadium; Berkeley, CA	W 31–7	30,000	
September 30	UCLA		California Memorial Stadium; Berkeley, CA (rivalry)	W 6–0	45,000	
October 7	at USC		Los Angeles Memorial Coliseum; Los Angeles, CA	T 6–6	40,000	
October 14	Pacific (CA)*		California Memorial Stadium; Berkeley, CA	W 14–0		
October 21	Fleet City*	No. 12	California Memorial Stadium; Berkeley, CA	L 2–19		
October 28	Washington		California Memorial Stadium; Berkeley, CA	L 7–33	30,000	
November 4	Alameda Coast Guard*		California Memorial Stadium; Berkeley, CA	L 6–12	20,000	
November 11	at UCLA		Los Angeles Memorial Coliseum; Los Angeles, CA	L 0–7	8,000	
November 18	No. 12 USC		California Memorial Stadium; Berkeley, CA	L 0–32	40,000	
November 25	Saint Mary's Pre-Flight*		California Memorial Stadium; Berkeley, CA	L 6–33	20,000	
*Non-conference game; Rankings from AP Poll released prior to the game; Source:

== Rankings ==
Ranking movements Legend: ██ Increase in ranking ██ Decrease in ranking — = Not ranked ( ) = First-place votes
	Week								
Poll	1	2	3	4	5	6	7	8	Final
AP	—	12 (1)	—	—	—	—	—	—	—
