= 1944 Saint Mary's Pre-Flight Air Devils football team =

American college football season

1944 Saint Mary's Pre-Flight Air Devils football
- Conference: Independent

Ranking
- AP: No. 19
- Record: 4–4
- Head coach: Jules V. Sikes (1st season)
- Home stadium: Kezar Stadium

1944 military service football records
	Conf.			Overall
Team	W	L	T	W		L		T
No. 3 Randolph Field		–		11	–	0	–	0
No. 5 Bainbridge		–		10	–	0	–	0
No. 18 Fort Pierce		–		9	–	0	–	0
No. T–13 Norman NAS		–		6	–	0	–	0
No. 6 Iowa Pre-Flight		–		10	–	1	–	0
No. 16 El Toro Marines		–		8	–	1	–	0
Hondo AAF		–		7	–	1	–	0
Bunker Hill NAS		–		6	–	1	–	0
Lincoln AAF		–		6	–	1	–	0
Blackland AAF		–		7	–	1	–	1
Keesler Field		–		8	–	1	–	2
No. 17 Great Lakes Navy		–		9	–	2	–	1
No. 10 March Field		–		7	–	2	–	2
Third Air Force		–		8	–	3	–	0
North Carolina Pre-Flight		–		6	–	2	–	1
Atlantic City NAS		–		5	–	2	–	0
Camp Peary		–		5	–	2	–	0
Tonopah AAF		–		5	–	2	–	0
Daniel Field		–		7	–	3	–	0
No. 20 Second Air Force		–		10	–	4	–	1
San Francisco Coast Guard		–		4	–	2	–	1
Ellington Field		–		6	–	3	–	2
Amarillo AAF		–		5	–	3	–	0
Alameda Coast Guard		–		4	–	2	–	2
Coronado Amphibious		–		2	–	1	–	1
Olathe NAS		–		4	–	2	–	2
Selman Field		–		4	–	2	–	2
Galveston AAF		–		5	–	3	–	2
Fleet City		–		6	–	4	–	1
Jacksonville NAS		–		4	–	3	–	0
San Diego NTS		–		4	–	3	–	1
Camp Beale		–		5	–	4	–	0
Lubbock AAF		–		5	–	4	–	0
Fort Warren		–		5	–	4	–	1
Fort Monroe		–		5	–	5	–	0
Klamath Falls Marines		–		2	–	2	–	1
Maxwell Field		–		5	–	5	–	0
Minter Field		–		3	–	3	–	0
No. 19 Saint Mary's Pre-Flight		–		4	–	4	–	0
Fourth Infantry		–		3	–	4	–	2
Georgia Pre-Flight		–		4	–	5	–	0
Third Infantry		–		4	–	5	–	0
Melville PT Boats		–		3	–	0	–	0
Bergstrom Field		–		3	–	4	–	0
Ottumwa NAS		–		3	–	4	–	0
Camp Lee		–		3	–	5	–	0
Cherry Point Marines		–		3	–	6	–	0
Chatham Field		–		2	–	8	–	1
Sampton NTS		–		2	–	7	–	0
Miami NTC		–		2	–	8	–	0
Bryan AAF		–		1	–	7	–	0
Fairfield-Suisun AAB		–		1	–	7	–	0
Richmond AAB		–		0	–	10	–	1
Camp Ellis		–		0	–	5	–	0
South Plains AAF		–		0	–	8	–	0
Rankings from AP Poll

The 1944 Saint Mary's Pre-Flight Air Devils football team represented the United States Navy pre-flight school at Saint Mary's College of California during the 1944 college football season. In its third season, the team compiled a 4–4 record, outscored opponents by a total of 96 to 70, and was ranked No. 19 in the final AP poll.

In August 1944, Lt. Jules V. Sikes was named as the team's coach. He had been an assistant coach to the 1943 team.

In the final Litkenhous Ratings, North Carolina Pre-Flight ranked 43rd among the nation's college and service teams and eighth out of 28 United States Navy teams with a rating of 90.4.

== Schedule ==
Date	Opponent	Site	Result	Attendance	Source
September 23	at Pacific (CA)	Baxter Stadium; Stockton, CA	L 6–14		
October 1	at Fleet City	Forster Field; Shoemaker, CA	L 0–12	10,000	
October 14	vs. USC	Ratcliffe Stadium; Fresno, CA	L 0–6	13,000	
October 21	at UCLA	Los Angeles Memorial Coliseum; Los Angeles, CA	W 21–12	20,000	
October 29	No. 11 March Field	Kezar Stadium; San Francisco, CA	L 0–7		
November 12	vs. Alameda Coast Guard	Kezar Stadium; San Francisco, CA	W 32–13	25,000	
November 19	Fleet City	Moraga, CA	W 3–0	3,000	
November 25	at California	California Memorial Stadium; Berkeley, CA	W 33–6	20,000	
Rankings from AP Poll released prior to the game

== Rankings ==
Ranking movements Legend: ██ Increase in ranking ██ Decrease in ranking — = Not ranked
	Week								
Poll	1	2	3	4	5	6	7	8	Final
AP	—	—	—	—	—	—	—	—	19
