= 1944 Fort Pierce Amphibs football team =

American college football season

1944 Fort Pierce Amphibs football
- Conference: Independent

Ranking
- AP: No. 18
- Record: 9–0
- Head coach: Hamp Pool (1st season)
- Home stadium: Jaycee Field

1944 military service football records
	Conf.			Overall
Team	W	L	T	W		L		T
No. 3 Randolph Field		–		11	–	0	–	0
No. 5 Bainbridge		–		10	–	0	–	0
No. 18 Fort Pierce		–		9	–	0	–	0
No. T–13 Norman NAS		–		6	–	0	–	0
No. 6 Iowa Pre-Flight		–		10	–	1	–	0
No. 16 El Toro Marines		–		8	–	1	–	0
Hondo AAF		–		7	–	1	–	0
Bunker Hill NAS		–		6	–	1	–	0
Lincoln AAF		–		6	–	1	–	0
Blackland AAF		–		7	–	1	–	1
Keesler Field		–		8	–	1	–	2
No. 17 Great Lakes Navy		–		9	–	2	–	1
No. 10 March Field		–		7	–	2	–	2
Third Air Force		–		8	–	3	–	0
North Carolina Pre-Flight		–		6	–	2	–	1
Atlantic City NAS		–		5	–	2	–	0
Camp Peary		–		5	–	2	–	0
Tonopah AAF		–		5	–	2	–	0
Daniel Field		–		7	–	3	–	0
No. 20 Second Air Force		–		10	–	4	–	1
San Francisco Coast Guard		–		4	–	2	–	1
Ellington Field		–		6	–	3	–	2
Amarillo AAF		–		5	–	3	–	0
Alameda Coast Guard		–		4	–	2	–	2
Coronado Amphibious		–		2	–	1	–	1
Olathe NAS		–		4	–	2	–	2
Selman Field		–		4	–	2	–	2
Galveston AAF		–		5	–	3	–	2
Fleet City		–		6	–	4	–	1
Jacksonville NAS		–		4	–	3	–	0
San Diego NTS		–		4	–	3	–	1
Camp Beale		–		5	–	4	–	0
Lubbock AAF		–		5	–	4	–	0
Fort Warren		–		5	–	4	–	1
Fort Monroe		–		5	–	5	–	0
Klamath Falls Marines		–		2	–	2	–	1
Maxwell Field		–		5	–	5	–	0
Minter Field		–		3	–	3	–	0
No. 19 Saint Mary's Pre-Flight		–		4	–	4	–	0
Fourth Infantry		–		3	–	4	–	2
Georgia Pre-Flight		–		4	–	5	–	0
Third Infantry		–		4	–	5	–	0
Melville PT Boats		–		3	–	0	–	0
Bergstrom Field		–		3	–	4	–	0
Ottumwa NAS		–		3	–	4	–	0
Camp Lee		–		3	–	5	–	0
Cherry Point Marines		–		3	–	6	–	0
Chatham Field		–		2	–	8	–	1
Sampton NTS		–		2	–	7	–	0
Miami NTC		–		2	–	8	–	0
Bryan AAF		–		1	–	7	–	0
Fairfield-Suisun AAB		–		1	–	7	–	0
Richmond AAB		–		0	–	10	–	1
Camp Ellis		–		0	–	5	–	0
South Plains AAF		–		0	–	8	–	0
Rankings from AP Poll

The 1944 Fort Pierce Amphibs football team represented the Fort Pierce Naval Amphibious Training Base, in Fort Pierce, Florida, during the 1944 college football season. The team compiled a 9–0 record and was ranked No. 18 in the final AP poll.

Three players from the Fort Pierce team were named to the Associated Press All-Service southern football team: back Bill Daley; tackle Donald Cohenour; and center Bill Godwin.

In the final Litkenhous Ratings, Fort Pierce ranked 26th among the nation's college and service teams and fourth out of 28 United States Navy teams with a rating of 99.5.

== Schedule ==
Date	Time	Opponent	Rank	Site	Result	Attendance	Source
October 8	3:15 p.m.	at Miami NTC		Burdine Stadium; Miami, FL	W 40–7		
October 14		Chatham Field		Fort Pierce, FL	W 74–0		
October 20		at Miami (FL)		Burdine Stadium; Miami, FL	W 38–0	13,959	
October 23		Mayport Naval Section Base		Fort Pierce, FL	W 53–0		
October 28	8:00 p.m.	Miami NTC		Jaycee Field; Fort Pierce, FL	W 70–0		
November 17		at Stuart Tigers		Stuart, FL	W 38–0		
November 25		at Jacksonville NAS		Mason Field; Jacksonville, FL	W 21–0	10,000	
December 3		vs. Third Air Force		Phillips Field; Tampa, FL	W 7–6	11,000	
December 10		Keesler Field	No. 18	Fort Pierce, FL	W 34–7		
Rankings from AP Poll released prior to the game; All times are in Eastern time

== Rankings ==
Ranking movements Legend: ██ Increase in ranking ██ Decrease in ranking — = Not ranked
	Week								
Poll	1	2	3	4	5	6	7	8	Final
AP	—	—	—	—	—	—	—	—	18
