= 1944 Idaho Southern Branch Bengals football team =

American college football season

1944 Idaho Southern Branch Bengals football
- Conference: Independent
- Record: 4–5
- Head coach: John Vesser (3rd season)
- Home stadium: Spud Bowl

1944 Western college football independents records
| | Conf. | | | Overall |
| Team | W | L | T | W | | L | | T |
|---|---|---|---|---|---|---|---|---|
| Nevada | | – | | 4 | – | 4 | – | 0 |
| Idaho Southern Branch | | – | | 4 | – | 5 | – | 0 |
| Pacific (CA) | | – | | 3 | – | 8 | – | 0 |
| Saint Mary's | | – | | 0 | – | 5 | – | 0 |
| Fresno State | | – | | 0 | – | 6 | – | 0 |

The 1944 Idaho Southern Branch Bengals football team was an American football team that represented the University of Idaho, Southern Branch (later renamed Idaho State University) as an independent during the 1944 college football season. In their third season under head coach John Vesser, the team compiled a 4–5 record and were outscored by their opponents, 199 to 94.

The Bengals had most recently fielded a team during 1942 and next competed in 1946; no team was fielded during 1943 or 1945 due to World War II. Described as "the first all-Navy football team ever to take the field" for the university, the players were part of the V-12 Navy College Training Program.

== Schedule ==
Contested during World War II, six of the team's games were played against military service teams. One of the games was contested outside the United States, in Edmonton against a squad of U.S. military servicemen called the Alaska Clippers.

| Date | Opponent | Site | Result | Attendance | Source |
|---|---|---|---|---|---|
| September 17 | Second Air Force | Spud Bowl; Pocatello, ID | L 0–45 | | |
| September 23 | Pocatello Marines (Note: Marines were stationed at the Naval Ordnance Plant (NOP) in Pocatello.) | Spud Bowl; Pocatello, ID | W 27–0 | | |
| September 30 | at Utah | Ute Stadium; Salt Lake City, UT | L 0–24 | 2,929 | |
| October 15 | at Fort Warren | Warren Bowl; Cheyenne, WY | L 0–66 | | |
| October 21 | Utah | Spud Bowl; Pocatello, ID | L 12–38 | | |
| October 28 | at Edmonton AAB | Clarke Stadium; Edmonton, AB | W 7–6 | 5,500 | |
| November 11 | at Utah State | Aggie Stadium; Logan, UT | L 7–8 | | |
| November 18 | vs. Edmonton AAB | Boise public school field; Boise, ID | W 7–6 | | |
| November 23 | Pocatello Marines | Spud Bowl; Pocatello, ID | W 34–6 | | |
