= 1944 Pacific Tigers football team =

American college football season

1944 Pacific Tigers football
- Conference: Independent
- Record: 3–8
- Head coach: Amos Alonzo Stagg (12th season)
- Home stadium: Baxter Stadium

1944 Western college football independents records
	Conf.			Overall
Team	W	L	T	W		L		T
Nevada		–		4	–	4	–	0
Idaho Southern Branch		–		4	–	5	–	0
Pacific (CA)		–		3	–	8	–	0
Saint Mary's		–		0	–	5	–	0
Fresno State		–		0	–	6	–	0

The 1944 Pacific Tigers football team was an American football team that represented the College of the Pacific—now known as the University of the Pacific—in Stockton, California as an independent during the 1944 college football season. In their 12th season under head coach Amos Alonzo Stagg, the Tigers compiled a record of 3–8. The Tigers played home games at Baxter Stadium in Stockton.

== Schedule ==
Date	Time	Opponent	Site	Result	Attendance	Source
September 8		Fleet City	Baxter Stadium; Stockton, CA	L 6–7		
September 15		Fairfield-Suisun AAB	Baxter Stadium; Stockton, CA	W 25–0		
September 23		Saint Mary's Pre-Flight	Baxter Stadium; Stockton, CA	W 14–6		
September 30		at USC	Los Angeles Memorial Coliseum; Los Angeles, CA	L 6–18	32,000	
October 14		at California	California Memorial Stadium; Berkeley, CA	L 0–14		
October 21		Alameda Coast Guard	Baxter Stadium; Stockton, CA	L 0–19		
November 11		San Francisco Coast Guard	Baxter Stadium; Stockton, CA	L 0–13		
November 18		at UCLA	Los Angeles Memorial Coliseum; Los Angeles, CA	L 7–54	15,000	
November 23		at Fresno State	Ratcliffe Stadium; Fresno, CA	W 14–6	4,500	
December 1	8:00 p.m.	Camp Beale	Baxter Stadium; Stockton, CA	L 2–6		
December 9		at Sacramento City College	Sacramento Stadium; Sacramento, CA	L 0–6	7,500	
All times are in Pacific time
