= 1944 Bainbridge Commodores football team =

American college football season

1944 Bainbridge Commodores football
- Conference: Independent

Ranking
- AP: No. 5
- Record: 10–0
- Head coach: Joe Maniaci (2nd season)
- Home stadium: Tome Field

1944 military service football records
	Conf.			Overall
Team	W	L	T	W		L		T
No. 3 Randolph Field		–		11	–	0	–	0
No. 5 Bainbridge		–		10	–	0	–	0
No. 18 Fort Pierce		–		9	–	0	–	0
No. T–13 Norman NAS		–		6	–	0	–	0
No. 6 Iowa Pre-Flight		–		10	–	1	–	0
No. 16 El Toro Marines		–		8	–	1	–	0
Hondo AAF		–		7	–	1	–	0
Bunker Hill NAS		–		6	–	1	–	0
Lincoln AAF		–		6	–	1	–	0
Blackland AAF		–		7	–	1	–	1
Keesler Field		–		8	–	1	–	2
No. 17 Great Lakes Navy		–		9	–	2	–	1
No. 10 March Field		–		7	–	2	–	2
Third Air Force		–		8	–	3	–	0
North Carolina Pre-Flight		–		6	–	2	–	1
Atlantic City NAS		–		5	–	2	–	0
Camp Peary		–		5	–	2	–	0
Tonopah AAF		–		5	–	2	–	0
Daniel Field		–		7	–	3	–	0
No. 20 Second Air Force		–		10	–	4	–	1
San Francisco Coast Guard		–		4	–	2	–	1
Ellington Field		–		6	–	3	–	2
Amarillo AAF		–		5	–	3	–	0
Alameda Coast Guard		–		4	–	2	–	2
Coronado Amphibious		–		2	–	1	–	1
Olathe NAS		–		4	–	2	–	2
Selman Field		–		4	–	2	–	2
Galveston AAF		–		5	–	3	–	2
Fleet City		–		6	–	4	–	1
Jacksonville NAS		–		4	–	3	–	0
San Diego NTS		–		4	–	3	–	1
Camp Beale		–		5	–	4	–	0
Lubbock AAF		–		5	–	4	–	0
Fort Warren		–		5	–	4	–	1
Fort Monroe		–		5	–	5	–	0
Klamath Falls Marines		–		2	–	2	–	1
Maxwell Field		–		5	–	5	–	0
Minter Field		–		3	–	3	–	0
No. 19 Saint Mary's Pre-Flight		–		4	–	4	–	0
Fourth Infantry		–		3	–	4	–	2
Georgia Pre-Flight		–		4	–	5	–	0
Third Infantry		–		4	–	5	–	0
Melville PT Boats		–		3	–	0	–	0
Bergstrom Field		–		3	–	4	–	0
Ottumwa NAS		–		3	–	4	–	0
Camp Lee		–		3	–	5	–	0
Cherry Point Marines		–		3	–	6	–	0
Chatham Field		–		2	–	8	–	1
Sampton NTS		–		2	–	7	–	0
Miami NTC		–		2	–	8	–	0
Bryan AAF		–		1	–	7	–	0
Fairfield-Suisun AAB		–		1	–	7	–	0
Richmond AAB		–		0	–	10	–	1
Camp Ellis		–		0	–	5	–	0
South Plains AAF		–		0	–	8	–	0
Rankings from AP Poll

The 1944 Bainbridge Naval Training Station Commodores football team represented the United States Naval Training Center Bainbridge, Maryland during the 1944 college football season. The team compiled a 10–0 record and was ranked No. 5 in the final AP poll. Joe Maniaci was the team's head coach.

Bainbridge players took five of eleven spots on the Associated Press' All-Mid-Atlantic football team: end Ed Vandeweghe, guard Buster Ramsey, center Lou Sossamon, and backs Charlie Justice and Harvey Johnson. Justice led the team in both scoring (14 touchdowns for 84 points) and rushing (529 yards on 48 carries for an average of 11.0 yards per carry). Harry Hopp was the team's second leading rusher with 520 yards on 83 carries (6.3 yards per carry).

In the final Litkenhous Ratings, Bainbridge ranked 28th among the nation's college and service teams and fifth out of 28 United States Navy teams with a rating of 98.8.

== Schedule ==
Date	Time	Opponent	Rank	Site	Result	Attendance	Source
September 30	2:30 p.m.	Camp Lee		Tome Field; Bainbridge, MD	W 43–0		
October 9		Camp Lejeune		Tome Field; Bainbridge, MD	W 53–7		
October 15		Camden Blue Devils	No. 18	Tome Field; Bainbridge, MD	W 47–7		
October 22		at Camp Peary	No. 18	Williamsburg, VA	W 7–0		
October 29		at Maxwell Field	No. 13	Cramton Bowl; Montgomery, AL	W 15–7		
November 5	2:30 p.m.	at No. 8 North Carolina Pre-Flight	No. 12	Kenan Memorial Stadium; Chapel Hill, NC	W 49–20	22,000	
November 11		Cherry Point Marines	No. 6	Tome Field; Bainbridge, MD	W 50–7		
November 19		at Camp Lejeune	No. 6	Camp Lejeune, NC	W 33–6		
November 25		Camp Peary	No. 5	Tome Field; Bainbridge, MD	W 21–13	13,000	
December 3		Maxwell Field	No. 5	Tome Field; Bainbridge, MD	W 13–3		
Rankings from AP Poll released prior to the game; All times are in Eastern time

== Rankings ==
Ranking movements Legend: ██ Increase in ranking ██ Decrease in ranking ( ) = First-place votes
	Week								
Poll	1	2	3	4	5	6	7	8	Final
AP	18	18 (2)	13 (2)	12 (2)	6 (6)	6 (4)	5 (4.33)	5 (11.33)	5 (3)
