= 1944 Georgia Pre-Flight Skycrackers football team =

American college football season

1944 Georgia Pre-Flight Skycrackers football
- Conference: Independent
- Record: 4–5
- Head coach: Ducky Pond (1st season)
- Home stadium: Sanford Stadium

1944 military service football records
	Conf.			Overall
Team	W	L	T	W		L		T
No. 3 Randolph Field		–		11	–	0	–	0
No. 5 Bainbridge		–		10	–	0	–	0
No. 18 Fort Pierce		–		9	–	0	–	0
No. T–13 Norman NAS		–		6	–	0	–	0
No. 6 Iowa Pre-Flight		–		10	–	1	–	0
No. 16 El Toro Marines		–		8	–	1	–	0
Hondo AAF		–		7	–	1	–	0
Bunker Hill NAS		–		6	–	1	–	0
Lincoln AAF		–		6	–	1	–	0
Blackland AAF		–		7	–	1	–	1
Keesler Field		–		8	–	1	–	2
No. 17 Great Lakes Navy		–		9	–	2	–	1
No. 10 March Field		–		7	–	2	–	2
Third Air Force		–		8	–	3	–	0
North Carolina Pre-Flight		–		6	–	2	–	1
Atlantic City NAS		–		5	–	2	–	0
Camp Peary		–		5	–	2	–	0
Tonopah AAF		–		5	–	2	–	0
Daniel Field		–		7	–	3	–	0
No. 20 Second Air Force		–		10	–	4	–	1
San Francisco Coast Guard		–		4	–	2	–	1
Ellington Field		–		6	–	3	–	2
Amarillo AAF		–		5	–	3	–	0
Alameda Coast Guard		–		4	–	2	–	2
Coronado Amphibious		–		2	–	1	–	1
Olathe NAS		–		4	–	2	–	2
Selman Field		–		4	–	2	–	2
Galveston AAF		–		5	–	3	–	2
Fleet City		–		6	–	4	–	1
Jacksonville NAS		–		4	–	3	–	0
San Diego NTS		–		4	–	3	–	1
Camp Beale		–		5	–	4	–	0
Lubbock AAF		–		5	–	4	–	0
Fort Warren		–		5	–	4	–	1
Fort Monroe		–		5	–	5	–	0
Klamath Falls Marines		–		2	–	2	–	1
Maxwell Field		–		5	–	5	–	0
Minter Field		–		3	–	3	–	0
No. 19 Saint Mary's Pre-Flight		–		4	–	4	–	0
Fourth Infantry		–		3	–	4	–	2
Georgia Pre-Flight		–		4	–	5	–	0
Third Infantry		–		4	–	5	–	0
Melville PT Boats		–		3	–	0	–	0
Bergstrom Field		–		3	–	4	–	0
Ottumwa NAS		–		3	–	4	–	0
Camp Lee		–		3	–	5	–	0
Cherry Point Marines		–		3	–	6	–	0
Chatham Field		–		2	–	8	–	1
Sampton NTS		–		2	–	7	–	0
Miami NTC		–		2	–	8	–	0
Bryan AAF		–		1	–	7	–	0
Fairfield-Suisun AAB		–		1	–	7	–	0
Richmond AAB		–		0	–	10	–	1
Camp Ellis		–		0	–	5	–	0
South Plains AAF		–		0	–	8	–	0
Rankings from AP Poll

The 1944 Georgia Pre-Flight Skycrackers football team represented the United States Navy pre-flight aviation training school at the University of Georgia during the 1944 college football season. Led by first-year head coach Ducky Pond, the Skycrackers compiled a record of 4–5. The team's roster included Ronnie Cahill, Pat Harder, Elmer Jones, and Ted Scruggs.

In the final Litkenhous Ratings, Georgia Pre-Flight ranked 46th among the nation's college and service teams and ninth out of 28 United States Navy teams with a rating of 89.5.

== Schedule ==
Date	Time	Opponent	Site	Result	Attendance	Source
September 30	3:30 p.m.	at South Carolina	Carolina Stadium; Columbia, SC	W 20–14		
October 8		Cherry Point Marines	Sanford Stadium; Athens, GA	W 33–0		
October 15		Third Air Force	Sanford Stadium; Athens, GA	L 7–19		
October 21	2:30 p.m.	No. 10 North Carolina Pre-Flight	Kenan Memorial Stadium; Chapel Hill, NC	L 0–3		
October 27		at No. 5 Georgia Tech	Grant Field; Atlanta, GA	L 7–13	15,000	
November 5	2:30 p.m.	Third Air Force	American Legion Memorial Stadium; Charlotte, NC	L 12–34		
November 11		No. 16 North Carolina Pre-Flight	Sanford Stadium; Athens, GA	L 18–33		
November 19		Daniel Field	Sanford Stadium; Athens, GA	W 30–0		
November 26		at Daniel Field	Augusta Municipal Stadium; Augusta, GA	W 52–12		
Rankings from AP Poll released prior to the game; All times are in Eastern time
