= 1944 Washington Huskies football team =

American college football season

1944 Washington Huskies football
- Conference: Pacific Coast Conference
- Record: 5–3 (1–1 PCC)
- Head coach: Ralph Welch (3rd season)
- Captain: Jim McCurdy
- Home stadium: University of Washington Stadium

1944 Pacific Coast Conference football standings
	Conf.					Overall
Team	W		L		T	W		L		T
No. 7 USC $	3	–	0	–	2	8	–	0	–	2
Washington	1	–	1	–	0	5	–	3	–	0
UCLA	1	–	2	–	1	4	–	5	–	1
California	1	–	3	–	1	3	–	6	–	1
$ – Conference champion; Rankings from AP Poll

The 1944 Washington Huskies football team was an American football team that represented the University of Washington during the 1944 college football season. In its third season under head coach Ralph Welch, the team compiled a 5–3 record, finished second in the Pacific Coast Conference, and outscored its opponents 293 to 132. Jim McCurdy was the team captain.

== Schedule ==
Date	Opponent	Site	Result	Attendance	Source
September 23	Willamette*	University of Washington Stadium; Seattle, WA	W 71–0	5,000	
September 30	Whitman*	University of Washington Stadium; Seattle, WA	W 65–6	3,352	
October 7	at Willamette*	Multnomah Stadium; Portland, OR	W 40–6	1,492	
October 14	at Whitman*	Stadium; Walla Walla, WA	W 71–0	2,000	
October 23	at No. 15 USC	Los Angeles Memorial Coliseum; Los Angeles, CA	L 7–38	70,000	
October 28	at California	California Memorial Stadium; Berkeley, CA	W 33–7	30,000	
November 11	March Field*	University of Washington Stadium; Seattle, WA	L 0–28	21,000	
November 18	vs. Second Air Force*	Gonzaga Stadium; Spokane, WA	L 6–47	6,592	
*Non-conference game; Rankings from AP Poll released prior to the game; Source:

== NFL draft selections ==
Five Huskies were selected in the 1945 NFL draft, which lasted 32 rounds with 330 selections.

= Husky Hall of Fame

Player	Position	Round	Pick	NFL club
Don Deeks	Tackle	4	4	Boston Yanks
Sam Robinson	Back	8	9	Philadelphia Eagles
Arnie Weinmeister	Defensive tackle	17	2	Boston Yanks
Bob Gilmore	Back	23	11	Green Bay Packers
James McCurdy	Center	24	8	Washington Redskins
