= 1944 Third Air Force Gremlins football team =

American college football season

1944 Third Air Force Gremlins football
- Conference: Independent
- Record: 8–3
- Head coach: J. Quinn Decker (1st season)

1944 military service football records
| | Conf. | | | Overall |
| Team | W | L | T | W | | L | | T |
|---|---|---|---|---|---|---|---|---|
| No. 3 Randolph Field | | – | | 11 | – | 0 | – | 0 |
| No. 5 Bainbridge | | – | | 10 | – | 0 | – | 0 |
| No. 18 Fort Pierce | | – | | 9 | – | 0 | – | 0 |
| No. T–13 Norman NAS | | – | | 6 | – | 0 | – | 0 |
| No. 6 Iowa Pre-Flight | | – | | 10 | – | 1 | – | 0 |
| No. 16 El Toro Marines | | – | | 8 | – | 1 | – | 0 |
| Hondo AAF | | – | | 7 | – | 1 | – | 0 |
| Bunker Hill NAS | | – | | 6 | – | 1 | – | 0 |
| Lincoln AAF | | – | | 6 | – | 1 | – | 0 |
| Blackland AAF | | – | | 7 | – | 1 | – | 1 |
| Keesler Field | | – | | 8 | – | 1 | – | 2 |
| No. 17 Great Lakes Navy | | – | | 9 | – | 2 | – | 1 |
| No. 10 March Field | | – | | 7 | – | 2 | – | 2 |
| Third Air Force | | – | | 8 | – | 3 | – | 0 |
| North Carolina Pre-Flight | | – | | 6 | – | 2 | – | 1 |
| Atlantic City NAS | | – | | 5 | – | 2 | – | 0 |
| Camp Peary | | – | | 5 | – | 2 | – | 0 |
| Tonopah AAF | | – | | 5 | – | 2 | – | 0 |
| Daniel Field | | – | | 7 | – | 3 | – | 0 |
| No. 20 Second Air Force | | – | | 10 | – | 4 | – | 1 |
| San Francisco Coast Guard | | – | | 4 | – | 2 | – | 1 |
| Ellington Field | | – | | 6 | – | 3 | – | 2 |
| Amarillo AAF | | – | | 5 | – | 3 | – | 0 |
| Alameda Coast Guard | | – | | 4 | – | 2 | – | 2 |
| Coronado Amphibious | | – | | 2 | – | 1 | – | 1 |
| Olathe NAS | | – | | 4 | – | 2 | – | 2 |
| Selman Field | | – | | 4 | – | 2 | – | 2 |
| Galveston AAF | | – | | 5 | – | 3 | – | 2 |
| Fleet City | | – | | 6 | – | 4 | – | 1 |
| Jacksonville NAS | | – | | 4 | – | 3 | – | 0 |
| San Diego NTS | | – | | 4 | – | 3 | – | 1 |
| Camp Beale | | – | | 5 | – | 4 | – | 0 |
| Lubbock AAF | | – | | 5 | – | 4 | – | 0 |
| Fort Warren | | – | | 5 | – | 4 | – | 1 |
| Fort Monroe | | – | | 5 | – | 5 | – | 0 |
| Klamath Falls Marines | | – | | 2 | – | 2 | – | 1 |
| Maxwell Field | | – | | 5 | – | 5 | – | 0 |
| Minter Field | | – | | 3 | – | 3 | – | 0 |
| No. 19 Saint Mary's Pre-Flight | | – | | 4 | – | 4 | – | 0 |
| Fourth Infantry | | – | | 3 | – | 4 | – | 2 |
| Georgia Pre-Flight | | – | | 4 | – | 5 | – | 0 |
| Third Infantry | | – | | 4 | – | 5 | – | 0 |
| Melville PT Boats | | – | | 3 | – | 0 | – | 0 |
| Bergstrom Field | | – | | 3 | – | 4 | – | 0 |
| Ottumwa NAS | | – | | 3 | – | 4 | – | 0 |
| Camp Lee | | – | | 3 | – | 5 | – | 0 |
| Cherry Point Marines | | – | | 3 | – | 6 | – | 0 |
| Chatham Field | | – | | 2 | – | 8 | – | 1 |
| Sampton NTS | | – | | 2 | – | 7 | – | 0 |
| Miami NTC | | – | | 2 | – | 8 | – | 0 |
| Bryan AAF | | – | | 1 | – | 7 | – | 0 |
| Fairfield-Suisun AAB | | – | | 1 | – | 7 | – | 0 |
| Richmond AAB | | – | | 0 | – | 10 | – | 1 |
| Camp Ellis | | – | | 0 | – | 5 | – | 0 |
| South Plains AAF | | – | | 0 | – | 8 | – | 0 |
Rankings from AP Poll

The 1944 Third Air Force Gremlins football team represented the Third Air Force during the 1944 college football season. The team compiled a 8–3 record. The Third Air Force was part of the United States Army Air Forces and was based in 1944 at Morris Field in Charlotte, North Carolina.

The team played a 10-game schedule against other military service teams and defeated the Second Air Force team that was ranked No. 20 in the final 1944 AP poll. Its three losses were against teams ranked in the top 20 in the final poll: Randolph Field (No. 3); Great Lakes (No. 17); and Fort Pierce (No. 18).

J. Quinn Decker, who coached at Centre College before the war, was the team's head coach. The team's key players included backs Charley Trippi (left halfback), Ernie Bonelli (right halfback), Bob Kennedy (fullback), and Frank Gnup (quarterback), and linemen Art Brandau (center), Walt Barnes, and Jack Karwales. Trippi was named as a first-team player on the Associated Press' 1944 Service All-America team.

In the final Litkenhous Ratings, Third Air Force ranked 27th among the nation's college and service teams and sixth out of 63 United States Army teams with a rating of 99.4.

== Schedule ==
| Date | Time | Opponent | Rank | Site | Result | Attendance | Source |
|---|---|---|---|---|---|---|---|
| September 23 | | Charleston Coast Guard | | Charlotte, NC | W 31–0 | 12,000 | |
| October 1 | | at Chatham Field | | Savannah, GA | W 45–0 | 9,000 | |
| October 7 | 3:30 p.m. | vs. Third Infantry | | Carolina Stadium; Columbia, SC | W 22–0 | 12,000 | |
| October 15 | | at Georgia Pre-Flight | | Sanford Stadium; Athens, GA | W 19–7 | | |
| October 22 | | Cherry Point Marines | | Charlotte, NC | W 29–7 | | |
| October 28 | | at No. 3 Randolph Field | No. 19 | Alamo Stadium; San Antonio, TX | L 0–19 | 22,000 | |
| November 5 | 2:30 p.m. | Georgia Pre-Flight | | American Legion Memorial Stadium; Charlotte, NC | W 34–12 | | |
| November 11 | | at No. 14 Great Lakes Navy | | Ross Field; Great Lakes, IL | L 10–12 | 25,000 | |
| November 19 | | vs. Maxwell Field | | Phillips Field; Tampa, FL | W 41–7 | 12,000 | |
| December 3 | | vs. Fort Pierce | | Phillips Field; Tampa, FL | L 6–7 | 11,000 | |
| December 10 | | vs. No. 20 Second Air Force | | Grant Field; Atlanta, GA | W 14–7 | 8,000 | |
Rankings from AP Poll released prior to the game; All times are in Eastern time

== Rankings ==
Ranking movements Legend: ██ Increase in ranking ██ Decrease in ranking — = Not ranked т = Tied with team above or below
| | Week | | | | | | | | |
| Poll | 1 | 2 | 3 | 4 | 5 | 6 | 7 | 8 | Final |
|---|---|---|---|---|---|---|---|---|---|
| AP | — | — | 19т | — | — | — | — | — | — |
