= 1944 Great Lakes Navy Bluejackets football team =

American college football season

1944 Great Lakes Navy Bluejackets football
- Conference: Independent

Ranking
- AP: No. 17
- Record: 9–2–1
- Head coach: Paul Brown (1st season)
- Home stadium: Ross Field

1944 military service football records
	Conf.			Overall
Team	W	L	T	W		L		T
No. 3 Randolph Field		–		11	–	0	–	0
No. 5 Bainbridge		–		10	–	0	–	0
No. 18 Fort Pierce		–		9	–	0	–	0
No. T–13 Norman NAS		–		6	–	0	–	0
No. 6 Iowa Pre-Flight		–		10	–	1	–	0
No. 16 El Toro Marines		–		8	–	1	–	0
Hondo AAF		–		7	–	1	–	0
Bunker Hill NAS		–		6	–	1	–	0
Lincoln AAF		–		6	–	1	–	0
Blackland AAF		–		7	–	1	–	1
Keesler Field		–		8	–	1	–	2
No. 17 Great Lakes Navy		–		9	–	2	–	1
No. 10 March Field		–		7	–	2	–	2
Third Air Force		–		8	–	3	–	0
North Carolina Pre-Flight		–		6	–	2	–	1
Atlantic City NAS		–		5	–	2	–	0
Camp Peary		–		5	–	2	–	0
Tonopah AAF		–		5	–	2	–	0
Daniel Field		–		7	–	3	–	0
No. 20 Second Air Force		–		10	–	4	–	1
San Francisco Coast Guard		–		4	–	2	–	1
Ellington Field		–		6	–	3	–	2
Amarillo AAF		–		5	–	3	–	0
Alameda Coast Guard		–		4	–	2	–	2
Coronado Amphibious		–		2	–	1	–	1
Olathe NAS		–		4	–	2	–	2
Selman Field		–		4	–	2	–	2
Galveston AAF		–		5	–	3	–	2
Fleet City		–		6	–	4	–	1
Jacksonville NAS		–		4	–	3	–	0
San Diego NTS		–		4	–	3	–	1
Camp Beale		–		5	–	4	–	0
Lubbock AAF		–		5	–	4	–	0
Fort Warren		–		5	–	4	–	1
Fort Monroe		–		5	–	5	–	0
Klamath Falls Marines		–		2	–	2	–	1
Maxwell Field		–		5	–	5	–	0
Minter Field		–		3	–	3	–	0
No. 19 Saint Mary's Pre-Flight		–		4	–	4	–	0
Fourth Infantry		–		3	–	4	–	2
Georgia Pre-Flight		–		4	–	5	–	0
Third Infantry		–		4	–	5	–	0
Melville PT Boats		–		3	–	0	–	0
Bergstrom Field		–		3	–	4	–	0
Ottumwa NAS		–		3	–	4	–	0
Camp Lee		–		3	–	5	–	0
Cherry Point Marines		–		3	–	6	–	0
Chatham Field		–		2	–	8	–	1
Sampton NTS		–		2	–	7	–	0
Miami NTC		–		2	–	8	–	0
Bryan AAF		–		1	–	7	–	0
Fairfield-Suisun AAB		–		1	–	7	–	0
Richmond AAB		–		0	–	10	–	1
Camp Ellis		–		0	–	5	–	0
South Plains AAF		–		0	–	8	–	0
Rankings from AP Poll

The 1944 Great Lakes Navy Bluejackets football team represented Great Lakes Naval Training Station during the 1944 college football season. The team compiled a 9–2–1 record, outscored opponents by a total of 348 to 134, and was ranked No. 17 in the final AP poll.

In April 1944, Paul Brown, who coached at Ohio State before the war, was commissioned as a lieutenant and assigned to coach the Great Lakes football team.

The players on the 1944 Great Lakes team included backs Jim Youel (quarterback, Iowa), Eddie Saenz (left halfback, USC), Chuck Avery (right halfback, Minnesota), Jim Mello (fullback, Notre Dame), Don Lesher (halfback), Don Manglold (Indiana), Bob Hanlon, and Ara Parseghian (Miami (OH)), ends Cecil Souders and George Young (Georgia), and linemen Pete Krivonak (guard), Jesse Hahn (guard), and Carmen Izzo (center).

In the final Litkenhous Ratings, Great Lakes Navy ranked 11th among the nation's college and service teams and second out of 28 United States Navy teams with a rating of 112.4.

== Schedule ==
Date	Opponent	Rank	Site	Result	Attendance	Source
September 16	Fort Sheridan		Ross Field; Great Lakes, IL	W 62–0	25,000	
September 23	Purdue		Ross Field; Great Lakes, IL	W 27–18	25,000	
September 30	Illinois		Ross Field; Great Lakes, IL	T 26–26	25,000	
October 7	at Northwestern		Dyche Stadium; Evanston, IL	W 25–0	35,000	
October 14	Western Michigan	No. 5	Ross Field; Great Lakes, IL	W 38–0	25,000	
October 21	at No. 4 Ohio State	No. 6	Ohio Stadium; Columbus, OH	L 6–26	73,477	
October 28	at Wisconsin	No. 16	Camp Randall Stadium; Madison, WI	W 40–12	24,000	
November 5	at Marquette	No. 14	Marquette Stadium; Milwaukee, WI	W 45–7	12,000	
November 11	Third Air Force	No. 14	Ross Field; Great Lakes, IL	W 12–10	25,000	
November 18	Marquette	No. 13	Ross Field; Great Lakes, IL	W 32–0	25,000	
November 25	Fort Warren	No. 12	Ross Field; Great Lakes, IL	W 28–7	23,000	
December 2	at No. 9 Notre Dame	No. 12	Notre Dame Stadium; Notre Dame, IN	L 7–28	38,000	
Rankings from AP Poll released prior to the game

== Rankings ==
Ranking movements Legend: ██ Increase in ranking ██ Decrease in ranking ( ) = First-place votes
	Week								
Poll	1	2	3	4	5	6	7	8	Final
AP	5 (3)	6 (1)	16	14	14	13	12	12	17
