= 1944 Iowa Pre-Flight Seahawks football team =

American college football season

1944 Iowa Pre-Flight Seahawks football
- Conference: Independent

Ranking
- AP: No. 6
- Record: 10–1
- Head coach: Jack Meagher (1st season)
- Home stadium: Iowa Stadium

1944 military service football records
	Conf.			Overall
Team	W	L	T	W		L		T
No. 3 Randolph Field		–		11	–	0	–	0
No. 5 Bainbridge		–		10	–	0	–	0
No. 18 Fort Pierce		–		9	–	0	–	0
No. T–13 Norman NAS		–		6	–	0	–	0
No. 6 Iowa Pre-Flight		–		10	–	1	–	0
No. 16 El Toro Marines		–		8	–	1	–	0
Hondo AAF		–		7	–	1	–	0
Bunker Hill NAS		–		6	–	1	–	0
Lincoln AAF		–		6	–	1	–	0
Blackland AAF		–		7	–	1	–	1
Keesler Field		–		8	–	1	–	2
No. 17 Great Lakes Navy		–		9	–	2	–	1
No. 10 March Field		–		7	–	2	–	2
Third Air Force		–		8	–	3	–	0
North Carolina Pre-Flight		–		6	–	2	–	1
Atlantic City NAS		–		5	–	2	–	0
Camp Peary		–		5	–	2	–	0
Tonopah AAF		–		5	–	2	–	0
Daniel Field		–		7	–	3	–	0
No. 20 Second Air Force		–		10	–	4	–	1
San Francisco Coast Guard		–		4	–	2	–	1
Ellington Field		–		6	–	3	–	2
Amarillo AAF		–		5	–	3	–	0
Alameda Coast Guard		–		4	–	2	–	2
Coronado Amphibious		–		2	–	1	–	1
Olathe NAS		–		4	–	2	–	2
Selman Field		–		4	–	2	–	2
Galveston AAF		–		5	–	3	–	2
Fleet City		–		6	–	4	–	1
Jacksonville NAS		–		4	–	3	–	0
San Diego NTS		–		4	–	3	–	1
Camp Beale		–		5	–	4	–	0
Lubbock AAF		–		5	–	4	–	0
Fort Warren		–		5	–	4	–	1
Fort Monroe		–		5	–	5	–	0
Klamath Falls Marines		–		2	–	2	–	1
Maxwell Field		–		5	–	5	–	0
Minter Field		–		3	–	3	–	0
No. 19 Saint Mary's Pre-Flight		–		4	–	4	–	0
Fourth Infantry		–		3	–	4	–	2
Georgia Pre-Flight		–		4	–	5	–	0
Third Infantry		–		4	–	5	–	0
Melville PT Boats		–		3	–	0	–	0
Bergstrom Field		–		3	–	4	–	0
Ottumwa NAS		–		3	–	4	–	0
Camp Lee		–		3	–	5	–	0
Cherry Point Marines		–		3	–	6	–	0
Chatham Field		–		2	–	8	–	1
Sampton NTS		–		2	–	7	–	0
Miami NTC		–		2	–	8	–	0
Bryan AAF		–		1	–	7	–	0
Fairfield-Suisun AAB		–		1	–	7	–	0
Richmond AAB		–		0	–	10	–	1
Camp Ellis		–		0	–	5	–	0
South Plains AAF		–		0	–	8	–	0
Rankings from AP Poll

The 1944 Iowa Pre-Flight Seahawks football team represented the United States Navy pre-flight school at the University of Iowa as an independent during the 1944 college football season. In its third season, the team compiled a 10–1 record, outscored opponents by a total of 313 to 96, and was ranked No. 6 in the final AP poll.

In June 1944, Jack Meagher—the head football coach at Auburn from 1934 to 1942—was assigned to replace Don Faurot as the pre-fight school's head coach. Faurot had been transferred to Monmouth College in January. Meagher was serving as a lieutenant commander in the Navy and had been assigned previously to the technical training center in Norman, Oklahoma. Meagher's assistant coaches in 1944 included Bud Wilkinson (who later coached at Oklahoma), Steve Sinko, and Chuck Jaskwhich. Harvey Harman was the athletic director.

In the final Litkenhous Ratings, Iowa Pre-Flight ranked eighth among the nation's college and service teams and first out of 28 United States Navy teams with a rating of 115.9.

== Schedule ==
Date	Opponent	Rank	Site	Result	Attendance	Source
September 16	at Michigan		Michigan Stadium; Ann Arbor, MI	L 7–12	20,243	
September 23	at Minnesota		Memorial Stadium; Minneapolis, MN	W 19–13	31,600	
September 30	Olathe NAS		Iowa Stadium; Iowa City, IA	W 45–12	5,000	
October 7	vs. Second Air Force		Memorial Stadium; Lincoln, NE	W 12–6	29,500	
October 14	at No. 7 Purdue	No. 11	Ross–Ade Stadium; West Lafayette, IN	W 13–6	18,000	
October 22	Fort Warren	No. 5	Iowa Stadium; Iowa City, IA	W 30–0	8,000	
October 29	at Marquette	No. 6	Marquette Stadium; Milwaukee, WI	W 26–0	8,000	
November 4	at Tulsa	No. 7	Skelly Field; Tulsa, OK	W 47–27	18,000	
November 11	Bunker Hill NAS	No. 7	Iowa Stadium; Iowa City, IA	W 33–7	4,000	
November 18	at Missouri	No. 7	Memorial Stadium; Columbia, MO	W 51–7		
November 25	vs. Iowa	No. 7	Iowa Stadium; Iowa City, IA	W 30–6	2,500	
Rankings from AP Poll released prior to the game

== Rankings ==
Ranking movements Legend: ██ Increase in ranking ██ Decrease in ranking ( ) = First-place votes
	Week								
Poll	1	2	3	4	5	6	7	8	Final
AP	11 (1)	5 (0.25)	6	7	7	7	7 (2)	6 (1)	6 (1)

== Roster ==
Player	Position
Arthur Guepe	Back
John Herriman	End
Lou King	Back
Bus Mertes	Back
Randle Rushing	Back
Don Samuels	Back
Vic Schleich	Tackle
Bob Smith	Back
Jimmy Smith	Back
Warren Smith	Tackle
George Strohmeyer	Center
Dick Sullivan	Back
Dell Taylor	Back
Don Waldron	Back
Charles Woodward	Back
Courtney Simpson	Tackle
