= 1944 Fairfield-Suisun Army Air Base Skymasters football team =

American college football season

1944 Fairfield-Suisun Army Air Base Skymasters football
- Conference: Independent
- Record: 1–7
- Head coach: John Giannoni
- Home stadium: Corbus Field

1944 military service football records
	Conf.			Overall
Team	W	L	T	W		L		T
No. 3 Randolph Field		–		11	–	0	–	0
No. 5 Bainbridge		–		10	–	0	–	0
No. 18 Fort Pierce		–		9	–	0	–	0
No. T–13 Norman NAS		–		6	–	0	–	0
No. 6 Iowa Pre-Flight		–		10	–	1	–	0
No. 16 El Toro Marines		–		8	–	1	–	0
Hondo AAF		–		7	–	1	–	0
Bunker Hill NAS		–		6	–	1	–	0
Lincoln AAF		–		6	–	1	–	0
Blackland AAF		–		7	–	1	–	1
Keesler Field		–		8	–	1	–	2
No. 17 Great Lakes Navy		–		9	–	2	–	1
No. 10 March Field		–		7	–	2	–	2
Third Air Force		–		8	–	3	–	0
North Carolina Pre-Flight		–		6	–	2	–	1
Atlantic City NAS		–		5	–	2	–	0
Camp Peary		–		5	–	2	–	0
Tonopah AAF		–		5	–	2	–	0
Daniel Field		–		7	–	3	–	0
No. 20 Second Air Force		–		10	–	4	–	1
San Francisco Coast Guard		–		4	–	2	–	1
Ellington Field		–		6	–	3	–	2
Amarillo AAF		–		5	–	3	–	0
Alameda Coast Guard		–		4	–	2	–	2
Coronado Amphibious		–		2	–	1	–	1
Olathe NAS		–		4	–	2	–	2
Selman Field		–		4	–	2	–	2
Galveston AAF		–		5	–	3	–	2
Fleet City		–		6	–	4	–	1
Jacksonville NAS		–		4	–	3	–	0
San Diego NTS		–		4	–	3	–	1
Camp Beale		–		5	–	4	–	0
Lubbock AAF		–		5	–	4	–	0
Fort Warren		–		5	–	4	–	1
Fort Monroe		–		5	–	5	–	0
Klamath Falls Marines		–		2	–	2	–	1
Maxwell Field		–		5	–	5	–	0
Minter Field		–		3	–	3	–	0
No. 19 Saint Mary's Pre-Flight		–		4	–	4	–	0
Fourth Infantry		–		3	–	4	–	2
Georgia Pre-Flight		–		4	–	5	–	0
Third Infantry		–		4	–	5	–	0
Melville PT Boats		–		3	–	0	–	0
Bergstrom Field		–		3	–	4	–	0
Ottumwa NAS		–		3	–	4	–	0
Camp Lee		–		3	–	5	–	0
Cherry Point Marines		–		3	–	6	–	0
Chatham Field		–		2	–	8	–	1
Sampton NTS		–		2	–	7	–	0
Miami NTC		–		2	–	8	–	0
Bryan AAF		–		1	–	7	–	0
Fairfield-Suisun AAB		–		1	–	7	–	0
Richmond AAB		–		0	–	10	–	1
Camp Ellis		–		0	–	5	–	0
South Plains AAF		–		0	–	8	–	0
Rankings from AP Poll

The 1944 Fairfield-Suisun Army Air Base Skymasters football team was an American football team that represented the Air Transport Command at Suisun-Fairfield Air Base (now Travis Air Force Base), located near Fairfield, California, during the 1944 college football season. The team compiled a 1–7 record. John Giannoni, who played in the NFL for the Cleveland Rams in 1938, was the team's coach and also played for the team. The Skymasters played home games at Corbus Field in Vallejo, California.

In the final Litkenhous Ratings, Fairfield-Suisun AAB ranked 176th among the nation's college and service teams and 37th out of 63 United States Army teams with a rating of 52.5.

== Schedule ==
Date	Time	Opponent	Site	Result	Attendance	Source
September 15		at Pacific (CA)	Baxter Stadium; Stockton, CA	L 0–25		
September 30		at El Toro Marines	Municipal Bowl; Santa Ana, CA	L 0–56		
October 7		Camp Parks Seabees	Corbus Field; Vallejo, CA	W 13–0		
October 14		Klammath Falls Marine Barracks	Corbus Field; Vallejo, CA	L 12–14		
October 22		San Francisco Coast Guard	Corbus Field; Vallejo, CA	L 6–40	4,000	
October 30		Tonopah AAF	Corbus Field; Vallejo, CA	L 7–20		
November 5		at Tonopah AAF	Sagebrush Bowl; Nye County, NV	L 0–9	2,000	
November 12		at Klamath Falls Marine Barracks	Modoc Field; Klamath Falls, OR	Cancelled due to takeoff accident		
November 18	8:00 p.m.	at Camp Beale	Knight Field; Marysville, CA	L 0–12		
All times are in Pacific time
