= 1944 Nevada Wolf Pack football team =

American college football season

1944 Nevada Wolf Pack football
- Conference: Independent
- Record: 4–4
- Head coach: Jim Aiken (6th season)
- Home stadium: Mackay Field

1944 Western college football independents records
	Conf.			Overall
Team	W	L	T	W		L		T
Nevada		–		4	–	4	–	0
Idaho Southern Branch		–		4	–	5	–	0
Pacific (CA)		–		3	–	8	–	0
Saint Mary's		–		0	–	5	–	0
Fresno State		–		0	–	6	–	0

The 1944 Nevada Wolf Pack football team was an American football team that represented the University of Nevada as an independent during the 1944 college football season. In their sixth under head coach Jim Aiken, the Wolf Pack compiled a 4–4 record.

Bill Mackrides starred for the 1944 Wolf Pack. He later played seven years of professional football in the National Football League (NFL) and Canadian Football League (CFL).

== Schedule ==
Date	Time	Opponent	Site	Result	Attendance	Source
September 24	2:00 p.m.	at Tonopah AAF	Sagebrush Bowl; Nye County, NV	W 20–0	300	
October 1		Alameda Coast Guard	Mackay Stadium; Reno, NV	L 0–35		
October 8		vs. Arizona State–Flagstaff	Butcher Memorial Field; Las Vegas, NV	W 25–6		
October 14	2:15 p.m.	Tonopah AAF	Mackay Stadium; Reno, NV	L 6–7		
October 21		at Utah State	USAC Stadium; Logan, UT	W 13–7		
October 28		Utah^{†}	Mackay Stadium; Reno, NV	L 14–19	2,000	
November 5		vs. Alaska Clippers	Edmonton, AB	W 12–0		
November 11		Fleet City	Mackay Stadium; Reno, NV	L 2–19		
^{†}Homecoming; All times are in Pacific time
