= 1944 Lincoln Army Air Field Wings football team =

American college football season

1944 Lincoln Army Air Field Wings football
- Conference: Independent
- Record: 6–1
- Head coach: Bob Ingalls (1st season)
- Home stadium: Memorial Stadium

1944 military service football records
	Conf.			Overall
Team	W	L	T	W		L		T
No. 3 Randolph Field		–		11	–	0	–	0
No. 5 Bainbridge		–		10	–	0	–	0
No. 18 Fort Pierce		–		9	–	0	–	0
No. T–13 Norman NAS		–		6	–	0	–	0
No. 6 Iowa Pre-Flight		–		10	–	1	–	0
No. 16 El Toro Marines		–		8	–	1	–	0
Hondo AAF		–		7	–	1	–	0
Bunker Hill NAS		–		6	–	1	–	0
Lincoln AAF		–		6	–	1	–	0
Blackland AAF		–		7	–	1	–	1
Keesler Field		–		8	–	1	–	2
No. 17 Great Lakes Navy		–		9	–	2	–	1
No. 10 March Field		–		7	–	2	–	2
Third Air Force		–		8	–	3	–	0
North Carolina Pre-Flight		–		6	–	2	–	1
Atlantic City NAS		–		5	–	2	–	0
Camp Peary		–		5	–	2	–	0
Tonopah AAF		–		5	–	2	–	0
Daniel Field		–		7	–	3	–	0
No. 20 Second Air Force		–		10	–	4	–	1
San Francisco Coast Guard		–		4	–	2	–	1
Ellington Field		–		6	–	3	–	2
Amarillo AAF		–		5	–	3	–	0
Alameda Coast Guard		–		4	–	2	–	2
Coronado Amphibious		–		2	–	1	–	1
Olathe NAS		–		4	–	2	–	2
Selman Field		–		4	–	2	–	2
Galveston AAF		–		5	–	3	–	2
Fleet City		–		6	–	4	–	1
Jacksonville NAS		–		4	–	3	–	0
San Diego NTS		–		4	–	3	–	1
Camp Beale		–		5	–	4	–	0
Lubbock AAF		–		5	–	4	–	0
Fort Warren		–		5	–	4	–	1
Fort Monroe		–		5	–	5	–	0
Klamath Falls Marines		–		2	–	2	–	1
Maxwell Field		–		5	–	5	–	0
Minter Field		–		3	–	3	–	0
No. 19 Saint Mary's Pre-Flight		–		4	–	4	–	0
Fourth Infantry		–		3	–	4	–	2
Georgia Pre-Flight		–		4	–	5	–	0
Third Infantry		–		4	–	5	–	0
Melville PT Boats		–		3	–	0	–	0
Bergstrom Field		–		3	–	4	–	0
Ottumwa NAS		–		3	–	4	–	0
Camp Lee		–		3	–	5	–	0
Cherry Point Marines		–		3	–	6	–	0
Chatham Field		–		2	–	8	–	1
Sampton NTS		–		2	–	7	–	0
Miami NTC		–		2	–	8	–	0
Bryan AAF		–		1	–	7	–	0
Fairfield-Suisun AAB		–		1	–	7	–	0
Richmond AAB		–		0	–	10	–	1
Camp Ellis		–		0	–	5	–	0
South Plains AAF		–		0	–	8	–	0
Rankings from AP Poll

The 1944 Lincoln Army Air Field Wings football team represented the United States Army Air Forces' Lincoln Army Air Field (LAAF or Lincoln AAF), in Lincoln, Nebraska, during the 1944 college football season. Led by head coach Bob Ingalls, the Wings compiled a record of 6–1. Captain Stan Hall was the team's line coach. The Lincoln AAF's roster included Bob Cowan, Dutch Elston, and Russ Reader.

In the final Litkenhous Ratings, Lincoln AAF ranked 17th among the nation's college and service teams and fourth out of 63 United States Army teams with a rating of 104.4.

== Schedule ==
Date	Time	Opponent	Site	Result	Attendance	Source
September 15		at Peru Navy V-12	Peru, NE	W 26–7		
September 24		Fort Logan	Memorial Stadium; Lincoln, NE	cancelled		
October 1	2:00 p.m.	Fort Warren	Memorial Stadium; Lincoln, NE	W 14–5	10,000–12,000	
October 8	2:30 p.m.	at Kearney AAF	College Stadium; Kearney, NE	W 20–0		
October 15	2:00 p.m.	Ottumwa NAS	Memorial Stadium; Lincoln, NE	W 15–2	10,000–12,000	
October 22		at Marquette	Marquette Stadium; Milwaukee, WI	W 13–12	10,000	
October 29		at Fort Warren	Warren Bowl; Cheyenne, WY	L 6–19		
November 12		at Ottumwa NAS	Ottumwa, IA	W 39–0		
All times are in Central time
