= 1944 Alameda Coast Guard Sea Lions football team =

American college football season

1944 Alameda Coast Guard Sea Lions football
- Conference: Independent
- Record: 4–2–2
- Head coach: Joe Verducci (3rd season)
- Home stadium: Kezar Stadium

1944 military service football records
	Conf.			Overall
Team	W	L	T	W		L		T
No. 3 Randolph Field		–		11	–	0	–	0
No. 5 Bainbridge		–		10	–	0	–	0
No. 18 Fort Pierce		–		9	–	0	–	0
No. T–13 Norman NAS		–		6	–	0	–	0
No. 6 Iowa Pre-Flight		–		10	–	1	–	0
No. 16 El Toro Marines		–		8	–	1	–	0
Hondo AAF		–		7	–	1	–	0
Bunker Hill NAS		–		6	–	1	–	0
Lincoln AAF		–		6	–	1	–	0
Blackland AAF		–		7	–	1	–	1
Keesler Field		–		8	–	1	–	2
No. 17 Great Lakes Navy		–		9	–	2	–	1
No. 10 March Field		–		7	–	2	–	2
Third Air Force		–		8	–	3	–	0
North Carolina Pre-Flight		–		6	–	2	–	1
Atlantic City NAS		–		5	–	2	–	0
Camp Peary		–		5	–	2	–	0
Tonopah AAF		–		5	–	2	–	0
Daniel Field		–		7	–	3	–	0
No. 20 Second Air Force		–		10	–	4	–	1
San Francisco Coast Guard		–		4	–	2	–	1
Ellington Field		–		6	–	3	–	2
Amarillo AAF		–		5	–	3	–	0
Alameda Coast Guard		–		4	–	2	–	2
Coronado Amphibious		–		2	–	1	–	1
Olathe NAS		–		4	–	2	–	2
Selman Field		–		4	–	2	–	2
Galveston AAF		–		5	–	3	–	2
Fleet City		–		6	–	4	–	1
Jacksonville NAS		–		4	–	3	–	0
San Diego NTS		–		4	–	3	–	1
Camp Beale		–		5	–	4	–	0
Lubbock AAF		–		5	–	4	–	0
Fort Warren		–		5	–	4	–	1
Fort Monroe		–		5	–	5	–	0
Klamath Falls Marines		–		2	–	2	–	1
Maxwell Field		–		5	–	5	–	0
Minter Field		–		3	–	3	–	0
No. 19 Saint Mary's Pre-Flight		–		4	–	4	–	0
Fourth Infantry		–		3	–	4	–	2
Georgia Pre-Flight		–		4	–	5	–	0
Third Infantry		–		4	–	5	–	0
Melville PT Boats		–		3	–	0	–	0
Bergstrom Field		–		3	–	4	–	0
Ottumwa NAS		–		3	–	4	–	0
Camp Lee		–		3	–	5	–	0
Cherry Point Marines		–		3	–	6	–	0
Chatham Field		–		2	–	8	–	1
Sampton NTS		–		2	–	7	–	0
Miami NTC		–		2	–	8	–	0
Bryan AAF		–		1	–	7	–	0
Fairfield-Suisun AAB		–		1	–	7	–	0
Richmond AAB		–		0	–	10	–	1
Camp Ellis		–		0	–	5	–	0
South Plains AAF		–		0	–	8	–	0
Rankings from AP Poll

The 1944 Alameda Coast Guard Sea Lions football team was an American football team that represented the United States Coast Guard's Alameda Coast Guard station during the 1944 college football season. The team compiled a 4–2–2 record. Lieutenant Joe Verducci was the coach.

In the final Litkenhous Ratings, San Francisco Coast Guard ranked 56th among the nation's college and service teams and second of out six United States Coast Guard teams with a rating of 85.1.

== Schedule ==
Date	Opponent	Site	Result	Attendance	Source
September 24	Fleet City	Kezar Stadium; San Francisco, CA	T 7–7	15,000	
October 1	at Nevada	Mackay Stadium; Reno, NV	W 35–0		
October 7	vs. Saint Mary's	Kezar Stadium; San Francisco, CA	W 18–0	12,000	
October 15	March Field	Kezar Stadium; San Francisco, CA	T 20–20	22,000	
October 21	at Pacific (CA)	Baxter Stadium; Stockton, CA	W 19–0		
October 27	at UCLA	Los Angeles Memorial Coliseum; Los Angeles, CA	L 13–26	20,000	
November 4	at California	Memorial Stadium; Berkeley, CA	W 12–6	20,000	
November 12	vs. St. Mary's Pre-Flight	Kezar Stadium; San Francisco, CA	L 13–32	25,000	
