= 1944 Ottumwa Naval Air Station Skyers football team =

American college football season

1944 Ottumwa Naval Air Station Skyers football
- Conference: Independent
- Record: 3–4
- Head coach: Jimmy Kitts (2nd season)
- Home stadium: Ottumwa High School Stadium

1944 military service football records
	Conf.			Overall
Team	W	L	T	W		L		T
No. 3 Randolph Field		–		11	–	0	–	0
No. 5 Bainbridge		–		10	–	0	–	0
No. 18 Fort Pierce		–		9	–	0	–	0
No. T–13 Norman NAS		–		6	–	0	–	0
No. 6 Iowa Pre-Flight		–		10	–	1	–	0
No. 16 El Toro Marines		–		8	–	1	–	0
Hondo AAF		–		7	–	1	–	0
Bunker Hill NAS		–		6	–	1	–	0
Lincoln AAF		–		6	–	1	–	0
Blackland AAF		–		7	–	1	–	1
Keesler Field		–		8	–	1	–	2
No. 17 Great Lakes Navy		–		9	–	2	–	1
No. 10 March Field		–		7	–	2	–	2
Third Air Force		–		8	–	3	–	0
North Carolina Pre-Flight		–		6	–	2	–	1
Atlantic City NAS		–		5	–	2	–	0
Camp Peary		–		5	–	2	–	0
Tonopah AAF		–		5	–	2	–	0
Daniel Field		–		7	–	3	–	0
No. 20 Second Air Force		–		10	–	4	–	1
San Francisco Coast Guard		–		4	–	2	–	1
Ellington Field		–		6	–	3	–	2
Amarillo AAF		–		5	–	3	–	0
Alameda Coast Guard		–		4	–	2	–	2
Coronado Amphibious		–		2	–	1	–	1
Olathe NAS		–		4	–	2	–	2
Selman Field		–		4	–	2	–	2
Galveston AAF		–		5	–	3	–	2
Fleet City		–		6	–	4	–	1
Jacksonville NAS		–		4	–	3	–	0
San Diego NTS		–		4	–	3	–	1
Camp Beale		–		5	–	4	–	0
Lubbock AAF		–		5	–	4	–	0
Fort Warren		–		5	–	4	–	1
Fort Monroe		–		5	–	5	–	0
Klamath Falls Marines		–		2	–	2	–	1
Maxwell Field		–		5	–	5	–	0
Minter Field		–		3	–	3	–	0
No. 19 Saint Mary's Pre-Flight		–		4	–	4	–	0
Fourth Infantry		–		3	–	4	–	2
Georgia Pre-Flight		–		4	–	5	–	0
Third Infantry		–		4	–	5	–	0
Melville PT Boats		–		3	–	0	–	0
Bergstrom Field		–		3	–	4	–	0
Ottumwa NAS		–		3	–	4	–	0
Camp Lee		–		3	–	5	–	0
Cherry Point Marines		–		3	–	6	–	0
Chatham Field		–		2	–	8	–	1
Sampton NTS		–		2	–	7	–	0
Miami NTC		–		2	–	8	–	0
Bryan AAF		–		1	–	7	–	0
Fairfield-Suisun AAB		–		1	–	7	–	0
Richmond AAB		–		0	–	10	–	1
Camp Ellis		–		0	–	5	–	0
South Plains AAF		–		0	–	8	–	0
Rankings from AP Poll

The 1944 Ottumwa Naval Air Station Skyers football team represented Ottumwa Naval Air Station (Ottumwa NAS), located near Ottumwa, Iowa, during the 1944 college football season. Led by second-year head coach Jimmy Kitts, the Skyers compiled a record of 3–4. The team's roster included Bob Steuber.

In the final Litkenhous Ratings, Ottumwa NAS ranked 50th among the nation's college and service teams and 11th out of 28 United States Navy teams with a rating of 87.5.

== Schedule ==
Date	Time	Opponent	Site	Result	Attendance	Source
September 24		at Iowa State Prison	Fort Madison, IA	W 52–0		
October 1		at Camp Ellis	Camp Ellis, IL	W 45–7	8,000–10,000	
October 7		at Bunker Hill NAS	Naval Air Station Bunker Hill; Bunker Hill, IN	L 13–14		
October 15	2:00 p.m.	at Lincoln AAF	Memorial Stadium; Lincoln, NE	L 2–15	10,000–12,000	
October 22	2:00 p.m.	Camp Ellis	Ottumwa High School Stadium; Ottumwa, IA	W 33–0	7,000	
October 29	2:00 p.m.	Bunker Hill NAS	Ottumwa High School Stadium; Ottumwa, IA	L 0–13	8,500	
November 12		Lincoln AAF	Ottumwa, IA	L 0–39		
All times are in Central time
