= Norris-Penrose Event Center =

Multi-purpose facility in Colorado Springs, Colorado

Coordinates: 38°49′23″N 104°50′56″W

The Norris Penrose Event Center is a multi-purpose facility in Colorado Springs, Colorado, located at the base of Pikes Peak. It is home to the NFR Open at the Pikes Peak or Bust Rodeo. It consists of a 49,400 square foot indoor event center and a 51,000 square foot outdoor stadium arena, built in 1938 by Spencer Penrose, rancher and capitalist Jasper Ackerman, and mining partner Charles Leaming Tutt. The stadium was named after Penrose following his death. The outdoor stadium seats up to 5,500 spectators and once hosted a football game between the Los Angeles Bulldogs and the Pittsburgh Pirates. With five original horse barns (now nine), an indoor arena built in 1986, and seating up to 500 spectators, the stadium was home to the Colorado Candoos of the National Indoor Football League.

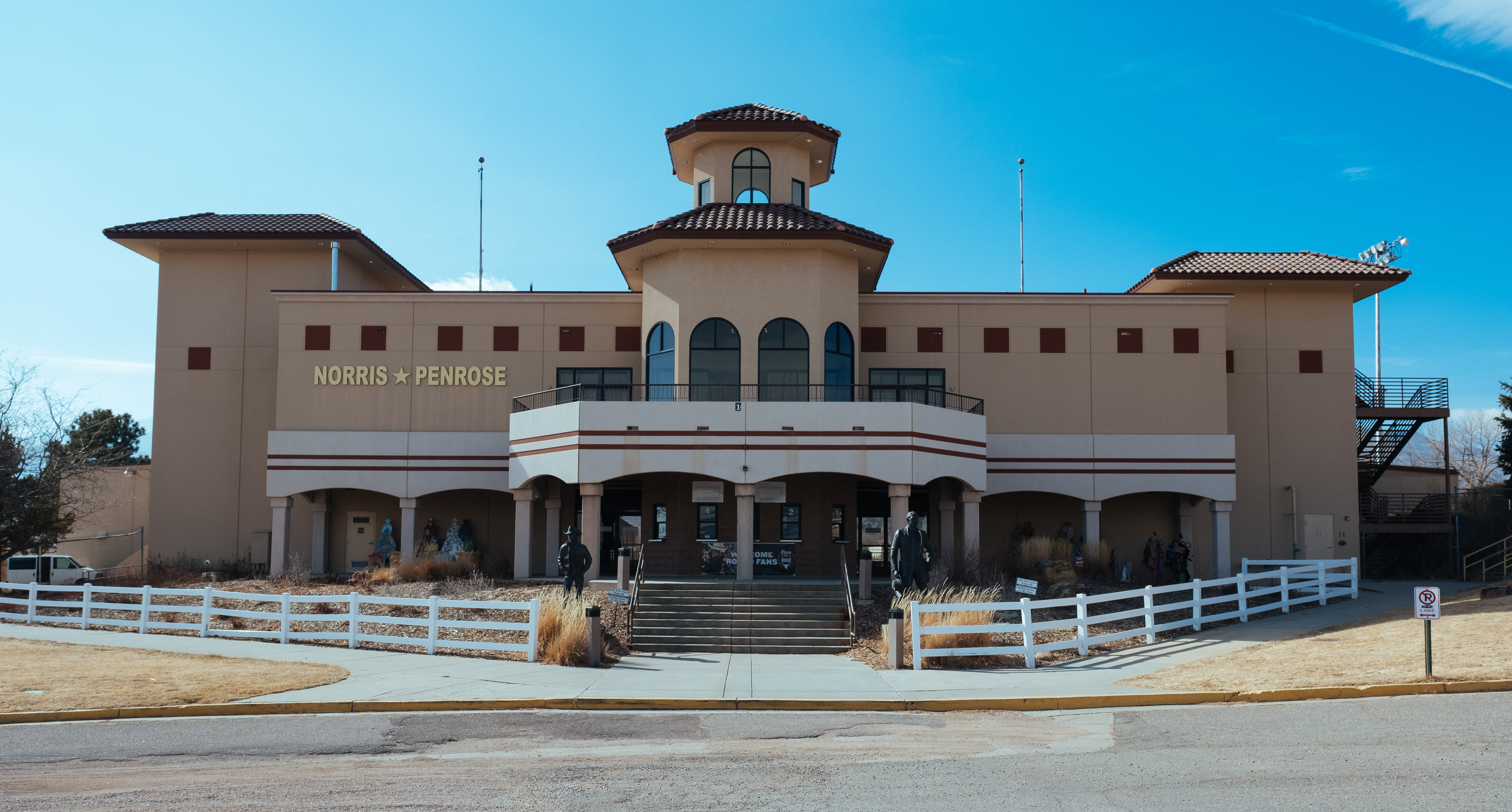
Front Entrance

== History ==
The Will Rogers Stadium was built on the west side of Cheyenne Lake in 1938. The Roundup began in 1920 as a combination rodeo with Native American dances and ceremonies. The stadium, the site of concerts, and the home of the Colorado Springs Rodeo, were renamed the Penrose Stadium after the death of Spencer Penrose. Penrose Stadium was torn down in 1975–1976 to make way for Broadmoor West. Penrose Equestrian Center built in Bear Creek Regional Park was dedicated in 1974.
