= 1944 Holy Cross Crusaders football team =

American college football season

1944 Holy Cross Crusaders football
- Conference: Independent
- Record: 5–2–2
- Head coach: Ank Scanlan (3rd season)
- Home stadium: Fitton Field

1944 Eastern college football independents records
	Conf.			Overall
Team	W	L	T	W		L		T
No. 1 Army		–		9	–	0	–	0
Yale		–		7	–	0	–	1
Harvard		–		5	–	1	–	0
Bucknell		–		7	–	2	–	1
Penn State		–		6	–	3	–	0
Penn		–		5	–	3	–	0
Boston College		–		4	–	3	–	0
Cornell		–		5	–	4	–	0
Villanova		–		4	–	4	–	0
Drexel		–		2	–	2	–	0
Pittsburgh		–		4	–	5	–	0
Brown		–		3	–	4	–	1
Temple		–		2	–	4	–	2
Syracuse		–		2	–	4	–	1
Princeton		–		1	–	2	–	0
Dartmouth		–		2	–	5	–	1
Colgate		–		2	–	5	–	0
NYU		–		2	–	5	–	0
Columbia		–		2	–	6	–	0
Tufts		–		1	–	4	–	1
Franklin & Marshall		–		1	–	8	–	0
CCNY		–		0	–	7	–	0
Rankings from AP Poll

The 1944 Holy Cross Crusaders football team was an American football team that represented the College of the Holy Cross as an independent during the 1944 college football season. In its third year under head coach Ank Scanlan, the team compiled a 5–2–2 record. The team played its home games at Fitton Field in Worcester, Massachusetts.

== Schedule ==
Date	Opponent	Site	Result	Attendance	Source
September 30	at Dartmouth	Memorial Field; Hanover, NH	T 6–6	8,000	
October 6	at Temple	Temple Stadium; Philadelphia, PA	W 30–0	12,000	
October 15	Villanova	Fitton Field; Worcester, MA	W 26–0	32,000	
October 21	Brown	Fitton Field; Worcester, MA	T 24–24	5,000	
October 29	Coast Guard	Fitton Field; Worcester, MA	W 26–14	10,000	
November 5	New London Sub Base	Fitton Field; Worcester, MA	L 0–6	7,000	
November 11	Colgate	Fitton Field; Worcester, MA	W 19–13	10,000	
November 19	Melville PT Boats	Fitton Field; Worcester, MA	L 12–13	14,000	
November 26	vs. Boston College	Fenway Park; Boston, MA (rivalry)	W 30–14	30,000	
