= Wayne Williams (disambiguation) =

Wayne Williams (born 1958) is a convicted murderer.

Wayne Williams may also refer to:

- Wayne W. Williams (born 1963), American attorney and politician
- Wayne Williams (American football) (1921–2001), college football running back
- Wayne Williams, member of English boyband Another Level
- Wayne Williams, member of Maltese band Firelight
