= 1944 Sampson Naval Training Station Bluejackets football team =

American college football season

1944 Sampson Naval Training Station Bluejackets football
- Conference: Independent
- Record: 2–7
- Head coach: Jim Crowley (1st season)

1944 military service football records
	Conf.			Overall
Team	W	L	T	W		L		T
No. 3 Randolph Field		–		11	–	0	–	0
No. 5 Bainbridge		–		10	–	0	–	0
No. 18 Fort Pierce		–		9	–	0	–	0
No. T–13 Norman NAS		–		6	–	0	–	0
No. 6 Iowa Pre-Flight		–		10	–	1	–	0
No. 16 El Toro Marines		–		8	–	1	–	0
Hondo AAF		–		7	–	1	–	0
Bunker Hill NAS		–		6	–	1	–	0
Lincoln AAF		–		6	–	1	–	0
Blackland AAF		–		7	–	1	–	1
Keesler Field		–		8	–	1	–	2
No. 17 Great Lakes Navy		–		9	–	2	–	1
No. 10 March Field		–		7	–	2	–	2
Third Air Force		–		8	–	3	–	0
North Carolina Pre-Flight		–		6	–	2	–	1
Atlantic City NAS		–		5	–	2	–	0
Camp Peary		–		5	–	2	–	0
Tonopah AAF		–		5	–	2	–	0
Daniel Field		–		7	–	3	–	0
No. 20 Second Air Force		–		10	–	4	–	1
San Francisco Coast Guard		–		4	–	2	–	1
Ellington Field		–		6	–	3	–	2
Amarillo AAF		–		5	–	3	–	0
Alameda Coast Guard		–		4	–	2	–	2
Coronado Amphibious		–		2	–	1	–	1
Olathe NAS		–		4	–	2	–	2
Selman Field		–		4	–	2	–	2
Galveston AAF		–		5	–	3	–	2
Fleet City		–		6	–	4	–	1
Jacksonville NAS		–		4	–	3	–	0
San Diego NTS		–		4	–	3	–	1
Camp Beale		–		5	–	4	–	0
Lubbock AAF		–		5	–	4	–	0
Fort Warren		–		5	–	4	–	1
Fort Monroe		–		5	–	5	–	0
Klamath Falls Marines		–		2	–	2	–	1
Maxwell Field		–		5	–	5	–	0
Minter Field		–		3	–	3	–	0
No. 19 Saint Mary's Pre-Flight		–		4	–	4	–	0
Fourth Infantry		–		3	–	4	–	2
Georgia Pre-Flight		–		4	–	5	–	0
Third Infantry		–		4	–	5	–	0
Melville PT Boats		–		3	–	0	–	0
Bergstrom Field		–		3	–	4	–	0
Ottumwa NAS		–		3	–	4	–	0
Camp Lee		–		3	–	5	–	0
Cherry Point Marines		–		3	–	6	–	0
Chatham Field		–		2	–	8	–	1
Sampton NTS		–		2	–	7	–	0
Miami NTC		–		2	–	8	–	0
Bryan AAF		–		1	–	7	–	0
Fairfield-Suisun AAB		–		1	–	7	–	0
Richmond AAB		–		0	–	10	–	1
Camp Ellis		–		0	–	5	–	0
South Plains AAF		–		0	–	8	–	0
Rankings from AP Poll

The 1944 Sampson Naval Training Station Bluejackets football team represented United States Navy's Sampson Naval Training Station (Sampton NTS), located in Seneca County, New York, during the 1944 college football season. Led by head coach Jim Crowley, the Bluejackets compiled a record of 2–7.

In the final Litkenhous Ratings, Sampson NTS ranked 108th among the nation's college and service teams and 16th out of 28 United States Navy teams with a rating of 69.7.

== Schedule ==
Date	Time	Opponent	Site	Result	Attendance	Source
September 3		Boston Yanks	Sampson, NY	L 0–14	10,000	
September 7		Green Bay Packers	Sampson, NY	L 0–13	10,000	
September 13		New York Giants	Sampson, NY	L 0–13		
September 17		Cleveland Rams	Sampson, NY	L 12–26	10,000	
September 23		Colgate	Sampson, NY	L 9–13		
October 7	8:45 p.m.	at Villanova	Shibe Park; Philadelphia, PA	L 6–7	12,000	
October 15		Rochester Odenbachs	Sampson, NY	W 60–0		
October 21	3:00 p.m.	at Cornell	Schoellkopf Field; Ithaca, NY	L 6–13	3,000	
November 4	2:00 p.m.	at Scranton	Scranton Stadium; Scranton, PA	W 39–0	1,300	
All times are in Eastern time
