= Ank Scanlan =

American football player and coach

Biographical details
- Born: c. 1903
- Died: February 13, 1965 (aged 63); Philadelphia, Pennsylvania, U.S.

Playing career
- 1921–1923: Saint Joseph's
- Position: Halfback

Coaching career (HC unless noted)
- 1928–1941: St. Joseph's Prep (PA)
- 1942–1944: Holy Cross

Head coaching record
- Overall: 16–8–3 (college); 93–14–10 (high school)

Anthony J. "Ank" Scanlan (c. 1903 – February 13, 1965) was an American football coach. He served as the head football coach at the College of the Holy Cross in Worcester, Massachusetts from 1942 to 1944, compiling a record of 16–8–3.

== Early life ==
A native of Hazleton, Pennsylvania, Scanlan moved to Philadelphia at the age of ten. He played halfback at Saint Joseph's College and was captain of the 1923 team.

== Coaching ==
From 1928 to 1941, Scanlan was the head football coach at St. Joseph's Preparatory School in Philadelphia. He tallying a mark of 93–14–10 and won six Catholic League championships. Players he developed included Franny Murray and Jim Leonard.

On December 8, 1941, Holy Cross officials announced Scanlan as their new head coach. His hiring was a surprise, as he was fairly unknown outside of Philadelphia. In 1942, Scanlan led Holy Cross to one of the biggest upsets in college football history when the Crusaders defeated #1 ranked Boston College 55–12. While coaching Holy Cross, Scanlan continued to work as secretary and part owner of the Philadelphia Asbestos Company. During the 1943 and 1944 seasons, the factory's war contracts made it so that Scanlan could only coach on gameday, leaving assistants Lud Wray and Ox DaGrosa in charge of during the week. Scanlan resigned on December 18, 1944 so he could devote his full attention to his factory work.

== Death ==
Scanlan spent his later years as chairman of the American Asbestos Textile Corporation of Norristown, Pennsylvania. He died at the age of 63, on February 13, 1965, at his home in Philadelphia.

== Head coaching record ==
=== College ===
Year	Team	Overall	Conference	Standing	Bowl/playoffs	AP^{#}
Holy Cross Crusaders (Independent) (1942–1944)
1942	Holy Cross	5–4–1				T–19
1943	Holy Cross	6–2				
1944	Holy Cross	5–2–2				
Holy Cross:		16–8–3				
Total:		16–8–3				
^{#}Rankings from final AP Poll.
