= J. Ellwood Ludwig =

American sports coach (1911–2001)

Biographical details
- Born: January 12, 1911; Pottstown, Pennsylvania, U.S.
- Died: January 29, 2001 (aged 90); Frederick, Pennsylvania, U.S.

Playing career

Football
- 1930–1933: Penn

Coaching career (HC unless noted)

Football
- 1944–1945: Bucknell
- 1947–1952: Pennsylvania Military

Basketball
- 1943–1947: Bucknell
- 1947–1953: Pennsylvania Military
- 1955–1961: Sault Ste. Marie HS (MI)

Baseball
- 1944: Bucknell

Head coaching record
- Overall: 33–31–3 (college football); 106–74 (college basketball); 10–2 (college baseball)

James Ellwood Ludwig (January 12, 1911 – January 29, 2001) was an American football, basketball, and baseball coach. He served as the head football coach at Bucknell University from 1944 to 1945 and Pennsylvania Military—now known as Widener University—from 1947 to 1952, compiling a career college football coaching record of 33–31–3. Ludwig was the head basketball coach at Bucknell from 1943 to 1947 and Pennsylvania Military from 1947 to 1953, amassing a career college basketball coaching record of 105–73. He was also the head baseball coach at Bucknell in 1944, tallying a mark of 10–2.

== Head coaching record ==
=== Football ===
Year	Team	Overall	Conference	Standing	Bowl/playoffs
Bucknell Bison (Independent) (1944–1945)
1944	Bucknell	7–2–1			
1945	Bucknell	2–5			
Bucknell:		9–7–1			
Pennsylvania Military Cadets (Independent) (1947–1952)
1947	Pennsylvania Military	3–4–1			
1948	Pennsylvania Military	8–1			
1949	Pennsylvania Military	6–2–1			
1950	Pennsylvania Military	3–5			
1951	Pennsylvania Military	2–6			
1952	Pennsylvania Military	2–6			
Pennsylvania Military:		24–24–2			
Total:		33–31–3			
