= 1944 Marquette Hilltoppers football team =

American college football season

1944 Marquette Hilltoppers football
- Conference: Independent
- Record: 1–7
- Head coach: Thomas E. Stidham (4th season)
- Home stadium: Marquette Stadium

1944 Midwestern college football independents records
	Conf.			Overall
Team	W	L	T	W		L		T
Miami (OH)		–		8	–	1	–	0
Michigan State		–		6	–	1	–	0
No. 9 Notre Dame		–		8	–	2	–	0
Central Michigan		–		5	–	2	–	0
Wichita		–		5	–	2	–	1
Bowling Green		–		5	–	3	–	0
Western Michigan		–		4	–	3	–	0
Wayne		–		1	–	1	–	0
Ohio Wesleyan		–		1	–	8	–	1
Marquette		–		1	–	7	–	0
Rankings from AP Poll

The 1944 Marquette Hilltoppers football team was an American football team that represented Marquette University as an independent during the 1944 college football season. In its fourth season under head coach Thomas E. Stidham, the team compiled a 1–7 record and was outscored by a total of 191 to 73. The team played its home games at Marquette Stadium in Milwaukee.

== Schedule ==
Date	Opponent	Site	Result	Attendance	Source
September 23	Michigan	Marquette Stadium; Milwaukee, WI	L 0–14	18,000	
September 30	at Purdue	Ross–Ade Stadium; Lafayette, IN	L 7–40	15,500	
October 7	at Wisconsin	Camp Randall Stadium; Madison, WI	L 2–21	27,000	
October 14	Lawrence	Marquette Stadium; Milwaukee, WI	W 45–0	5,000	
October 22	Lincoln AAF	Marquette Stadium; Milwaukee, WI	L 12–13	10,000	
October 29	No. 6 Iowa Pre-Flight	Marquette Stadium; Milwaukee, WI	L 0–26	8,000	
November 5	No. 14 Great Lakes Navy	Marquette Stadium; Milwaukee, WI	L 7–45	12,000	
November 18	at No. 13 Great Lakes Navy	Ross Field; Great Lakes, IL	L 0–32	25,000	
Rankings from AP Poll released prior to the game
