= 1944 Miami Redskins football team =

American college football season

1944 Miami Redskins football
- Conference: Independent
- Record: 8–1
- Head coach: Sid Gillman (1st season)
- Captain: Ned Shiflett
- Home stadium: Miami Field

1944 Midwestern college football independents records
	Conf.			Overall
Team	W	L	T	W		L		T
Miami (OH)		–		8	–	1	–	0
Michigan State		–		6	–	1	–	0
No. 9 Notre Dame		–		8	–	2	–	0
Central Michigan		–		5	–	2	–	0
Wichita		–		5	–	2	–	1
Bowling Green		–		5	–	3	–	0
Western Michigan		–		4	–	3	–	0
Wayne		–		1	–	1	–	0
Ohio Wesleyan		–		1	–	8	–	1
Marquette		–		1	–	7	–	0
Rankings from AP Poll

The 1944 Miami Redskins football team was an American football team that represented Miami University as an independent during the 1944 college football season. In its first season under head coach Sid Gillman, Miami compiled an 8–1 record and outscored all opponents by a combined total of 185 to 74. The team won its first eight games before losing to DePauw (7–13). Ned Shiflett was the team captain.

== Schedule ==
Date	Opponent	Site	Result	Attendance	Source
September 9	vs. Bowling Green	Toledo, OH	W 28–7		
September 23	Oberlin	Miami Field; Oxford, OH	W 13–7		
September 30	Western Michigan	Miami Field; Oxford, OH	W 32–6		
October 7	at Rochester	Rochester, NY	W 19–7		
October 14	DePauw	Miami Field; Oxford, OH	W 12–0		
October 21	at Murray State	Cutchin Stadium; Murray, KY	W 26–14		
October 28	vs. Denison	University of Dayton Stadium; Dayton, OH	W 16–0	5,000	
November 11	at Ohio Wesleyan	Delaware, OH	W 32–20		
November 18	at DePauw	Greencastle, IN	L 7–13		
