= 1944 Lehigh Engineers football team =

American college football season

1944 Lehigh Engineers football
- Conference: Middle Three Conference
- Record: 0–6 (0–4 Middle Three)
- Head coach: Leo Prendergast (2nd season)
- Captain: Pete Kitson
- Home stadium: Taylor Stadium

1944 Middle Three Conference football standings
	Conf.					Overall
Team	W		L		T	W		L		T
Lafayette $	4	–	0	–	0	6	–	1	–	0
Rutgers	2	–	2	–	0	3	–	2	–	0
Lehigh	0	–	4	–	0	0	–	6	–	0
$ – Conference champion

The 1944 Lehigh Engineers football team was an American football team that represented Lehigh University during the 1944 college football season. In its second season under head coach Leo Prendergast, the team compiled an 0–6 record, including four losses against Middle Three Conference rivals. Lehigh played home games at Taylor Stadium in Bethlehem, Pennsylvania.

== Schedule ==
Date	Opponent	Site	Result	Attendance	Source
October 21	Lafayette	Taylor Stadium; Bethlehem, PA (rivalry)	L 0–44	500	
October 28	Drexel*	Taylor Stadium; Bethlehem, PA	L 6–13		
November 4	Rutgers	Taylor Stadium; Bethlehem, PA	L 6–19	2,200	
November 11	at West Virginia*	Mountaineer Field; Morgantown, WV	L 0–71		
November 18	at Lafayette	Fisher Field; Easton, PA (rivalry)	L 0–64	10,000	
November 25	at Rutgers	Rutgers Stadium; Piscataway, NJ	L 6–15	3,000	
*Non-conference game
