= 1944 Bowling Green Falcons football team =

American college football season

1944 Bowling Green Falcons football
- Conference: Independent
- Record: 5–3
- Head coach: Robert Whittaker (4th season)
- Captain: Donald Mohr
- Home stadium: University Stadium

1944 Midwestern college football independents records
	Conf.			Overall
Team	W	L	T	W		L		T
Miami (OH)		–		8	–	1	–	0
Michigan State		–		6	–	1	–	0
No. 9 Notre Dame		–		8	–	2	–	0
Central Michigan		–		5	–	2	–	0
Wichita		–		5	–	2	–	1
Bowling Green		–		5	–	3	–	0
Western Michigan		–		4	–	3	–	0
Wayne		–		1	–	1	–	0
Ohio Wesleyan		–		1	–	8	–	1
Marquette		–		1	–	7	–	0
Rankings from AP Poll

The 1944 Bowling Green Falcons football team, sometimes referred to as the Bee Gees, was an American football team that represented Bowling Green State College (later renamed Bowling Green State University) as an independent during the 1944 college football season. In their fourth season under head coach Robert Whittaker, the Falcons compiled a 5–3 record and outscored opponents by a total of 133 to 117. Donald Mohr was the team captain. The team played its home games at University Stadium in Bowling Green, Ohio.

== Schedule ==
Date	Opponent	Site	Result	Attendance	Source
September 1	at Central Michigan	Alumni Field; Mount Pleasant, MI	W 20–19		
September 9	vs. Miami (OH)	Toledo, OH	L 7–28		
September 16	at Ohio Wesleyan	Delaware, OH	W 13–6		
September 23	Baldwin–Wallace	University Stadium; Bowling Green, OH	L 6–13		
September 30	Alma	University Stadium; Bowling Green, OH	W 19–6		
October 7	Ohio Wesleyan^{†}	University Stadium; Bowling Green, OH	W 41–0		
October 14	at Case	Shaw Stadium; East Cleveland, OH	W 20–18		
October 21	at Bunker Hill NAS	Naval Air Station Bunker Hill; Bunker Hill, IN	L 7–27		
^{†}Homecoming
