= 1944 Boston College Eagles football team =

American college football season

1944 Boston College Eagles football
- Conference: Independent
- Record: 4–3
- Head coach: Moody Sarno (2nd season)
- Captains: Pete Baleyko; George Donelan
- Home stadium: Alumni Field, Braves Field, Fenway Park

1944 Eastern college football independents records
	Conf.			Overall
Team	W	L	T	W		L		T
No. 1 Army		–		9	–	0	–	0
Yale		–		7	–	0	–	1
Harvard		–		5	–	1	–	0
Bucknell		–		7	–	2	–	1
Penn State		–		6	–	3	–	0
Penn		–		5	–	3	–	0
Boston College		–		4	–	3	–	0
Cornell		–		5	–	4	–	0
Villanova		–		4	–	4	–	0
Drexel		–		2	–	2	–	0
Pittsburgh		–		4	–	5	–	0
Brown		–		3	–	4	–	1
Temple		–		2	–	4	–	2
Syracuse		–		2	–	4	–	1
Princeton		–		1	–	2	–	0
Dartmouth		–		2	–	5	–	1
Colgate		–		2	–	5	–	0
NYU		–		2	–	5	–	0
Columbia		–		2	–	6	–	0
Tufts		–		1	–	4	–	1
Franklin & Marshall		–		1	–	8	–	0
CCNY		–		0	–	7	–	0
Rankings from AP Poll

The 1944 Boston College Eagles football team represented Boston College as an independent during the 1944 college football season. The Eagles were led by head coach Moody Sarno, who was in his second year covering for Denny Myers while Myers served in the United States Navy. Boston College played their home games at Alumni Field in Chestnut Hill, Massachusetts and Braves Field and Fenway Park in Boston. They finished with a record of 4–3.

== Schedule ==
Date	Time	Opponent	Site	Result	Attendance	Source
October 7		at Harvard	Harvard Stadium; Boston, MA	L 0–13	43,000	
October 13	8:00 p.m.	CCNY	Braves Field; Boston, MA	W 33–0		
October 20		NYU	Fenway Park; Boston, MA	W 42–13	5,000	
October 28	2:00 p.m.	Syracuse	Fenway Park; Boston, MA	W 19–12		
November 4		Melville PT Boats	Alumni Field; Chestnut Hill, MA	L 0–45	12,000	
November 12	2:00 p.m.	Brooklyn	Fenway Park; Boston, MA	W 24–21	6,500	
November 26		vs. Holy Cross	Fenway Park; Boston, MA (rivalry)	L 14–30	30,000	
