= 1944 Notre Dame Fighting Irish football team =

American college football season

1944 Notre Dame Fighting Irish football
- Conference: Independent

Ranking
- AP: No. 9
- Record: 8–2
- Head coach: Edward McKeever (1st season)
- Captain: Pat Filley
- Home stadium: Notre Dame Stadium

1944 Midwestern college football independents records
| | Conf. | | | Overall |
| Team | W | L | T | W | | L | | T |
|---|---|---|---|---|---|---|---|---|
| Miami (OH) | | – | | 8 | – | 1 | – | 0 |
| Michigan State | | – | | 6 | – | 1 | – | 0 |
| No. 9 Notre Dame | | – | | 8 | – | 2 | – | 0 |
| Central Michigan | | – | | 5 | – | 2 | – | 0 |
| Wichita | | – | | 5 | – | 2 | – | 1 |
| Bowling Green | | – | | 5 | – | 3 | – | 0 |
| Western Michigan | | – | | 4 | – | 3 | – | 0 |
| Wayne | | – | | 1 | – | 1 | – | 0 |
| Ohio Wesleyan | | – | | 1 | – | 8 | – | 1 |
| Marquette | | – | | 1 | – | 7 | – | 0 |
Rankings from AP Poll

The 1944 Notre Dame Fighting Irish football team represented the University of Notre Dame as an independent during the 1944 college football season. With head coach Frank Leahy serving in the Navy during World War II, Edward McKeever took over as head coach. In their only season under McKeever, the Irish compiled an 8–2 record, outscored opponents by a total of 340 to 69, and were ranked No. 9 in the final AP poll. The Irish their first five games before losing consecutive games to No 6 Navy and No. 1 Army. The loss to Army, by a 59–0 score, was the worst in Notre Dame history.

Halfback Creighton Miller was selected as a consensus first-team player on the 1955 All-America college football team. Guard Pat Filley was the team captain and received second-team All-America honors from the United Press (UP). Halfback Bob Kelly received second-team honors from the UP and International News Service.

The team played its home games at Notre Dame Stadium in Notre Dame, Indiana.

== Schedule ==
| Date | Opponent | Rank | Site | Result | Attendance | Source |
|---|---|---|---|---|---|---|
| September 30 | at Pittsburgh | | Pitt Stadium; Pittsburgh, PA (rivalry) | W 58–0 | 46,069 | |
| October 7 | Tulane | | Notre Dame Stadium; Notre Dame, IN | W 26–0 | 32,909 | |
| October 14 | vs. Dartmouth | No. 1 | Fenway Park; Boston, MA | W 64–0 | 38,167 | |
| October 21 | Wisconsin | No. 1 | Notre Dame Stadium; South Bend, IN | W 28–13 | 36,086 | |
| October 28 | at No. 14 Illinois | No. 1 | Memorial Stadium; Champaign, IL | W 13–7 | 57,122 | |
| November 4 | vs. No. 6 Navy | No. 2 | Municipal Stadium; Baltimore, MD (rivalry) | L 13–32 | 60,938 | |
| November 11 | vs. No. 1 Army | No. 5 | Yankee Stadium; Bronx, NY (rivalry) | L 0–59 | 74,437 | |
| November 18 | Northwestern | No. 11 | Notre Dame Stadium; Notre Dame, IN (rivalry) | W 21–0 | 39,701 | |
| November 25 | at No. 10 Georgia Tech | No. 18 | Grant Field; Atlanta, GA (rivalry) | W 21–0 | 28,662 | |
| December 2 | No. 12 Great Lakes Navy | No. 9 | Notre Dame Stadium; Notre Dame, IN | W 28–7 | 36,900 | |
Rankings from AP Poll released prior to the game

== Rankings ==
Ranking movements Legend: ██ Increase in ranking ██ Decrease in ranking ( ) = First-place votes
| | Week | | | | | | | | |
| Poll | 1 | 2 | 3 | 4 | 5 | 6 | 7 | 8 | Final |
|---|---|---|---|---|---|---|---|---|---|
| AP | 1 (34) | 1 (59.67) | 1 (40) | 2 (15) | 5 | 11 | 18 | 9 | 9 |
