= 1944 Dartmouth Indians football team =

American college football season

1944 Dartmouth Indians football
- Conference: Independent
- Record: 2–5–1
- Head coach: Earl Brown (2nd season)
- Home stadium: Memorial Field

1944 Eastern college football independents records
	Conf.			Overall
Team	W	L	T	W		L		T
No. 1 Army		–		9	–	0	–	0
Yale		–		7	–	0	–	1
Harvard		–		5	–	1	–	0
Bucknell		–		7	–	2	–	1
Penn State		–		6	–	3	–	0
Penn		–		5	–	3	–	0
Boston College		–		4	–	3	–	0
Cornell		–		5	–	4	–	0
Villanova		–		4	–	4	–	0
Drexel		–		2	–	2	–	0
Pittsburgh		–		4	–	5	–	0
Brown		–		3	–	4	–	1
Temple		–		2	–	4	–	2
Syracuse		–		2	–	4	–	1
Princeton		–		1	–	2	–	0
Dartmouth		–		2	–	5	–	1
Colgate		–		2	–	5	–	0
NYU		–		2	–	5	–	0
Columbia		–		2	–	6	–	0
Tufts		–		1	–	4	–	1
Franklin & Marshall		–		1	–	8	–	0
CCNY		–		0	–	7	–	0
Rankings from AP Poll

The 1944 Dartmouth Indians football team represented Dartmouth College during the 1944 college football season.

== Schedule ==
Date	Opponent	Site	Result	Attendance	Source
September 30	Holy Cross	Memorial Field; Hanover, NH	T 6–6	8,000	
October 7	at Penn	Franklin Field; Philadelphia, PA	L 6–20	40,000	
October 14	vs. No. 1 Notre Dame	Fenway Park; Boston, MA	L 0–64	38,167	
October 28	at Brown	Brown Stadium; Providence, RI	W 14–13	8,000	
November 4	at Yale	Yale Bowl; New Haven, CT	L 0–6	40,000	
November 11	Coast Guard	Memorial Field; Hanover, NH	L 0–19	3,500	
November 18	at Cornell	Schoellkopf Field; Ithaca, NY	L 13–14	13,000	
November 25	at Columbia	Baker Field; New York, NY	W 18–0	12,000	
Rankings from AP Poll released prior to the game
