= 1944 Wichita Shockers football team =

American college football season

1944 Wichita Shockers football
- Conference: Independent
- Record: 5–2–1
- Head coach: Melvin J. Binford (1st season)

1944 Midwestern college football independents records
	Conf.			Overall
Team	W	L	T	W		L		T
Miami (OH)		–		8	–	1	–	0
Michigan State		–		6	–	1	–	0
No. 9 Notre Dame		–		8	–	2	–	0
Central Michigan		–		5	–	2	–	0
Wichita		–		5	–	2	–	1
Bowling Green		–		5	–	3	–	0
Western Michigan		–		4	–	3	–	0
Wayne		–		1	–	1	–	0
Ohio Wesleyan		–		1	–	8	–	1
Marquette		–		1	–	7	–	0
Rankings from AP Poll

The 1944 Wichita Shockers football team was an American football team that represented Wichita University (now known as Wichita State University) as an independent during the 1944 college football season. In its first season under head coach Melvin J. Binford, the team compiled a 5–2–1 record.

The team was led on offense by halfback Linwood Sexton, one of the first African-Americans to play for Wichita.

== Schedule ==
Date	Time	Opponent	Site	Result	Attendance	Source
September 23		Rockhurst	Wichita, KS	W 24–0		
September 30		at Kansas State	Memorial Stadium; Manhattan, KS	T 6–6	3,500	
October 14	2:30 p.m.	at Olathe NAS	Olathe, KS	L 0–13		
October 21		Doane	Wichita, KS	W 14–13		
October 28		at Rockhurst	Kansas City, MO	W 14–12		
November 4		Kansas State	Wichita, KS	L 0–15		
November 11		McCook AAF	Wichita, KS	W 13–7		
November 23		Drake	Wichita, KS	W 13–12		
All times are in Central time
