= 1944 Northern Illinois State Huskies football team =

American college football season

1944 Northern Illinois State Huskies football

IIAC champion
- Conference: Illinois Intercollegiate Athletic Conference
- Record: 7–0 (3–0 IIAC)
- Head coach: Chick Evans (16th season)
- Captain: Henry Leskovec
- Home stadium: Glidden Field

1944 Illinois Intercollegiate Athletic Conference football standings
	Conf.					Overall
Team	W		L		T	W		L		T
Northern Illinois State $	3	–	0	–	0	7	–	0	–	0
Illinois State Normal	1	–	0	–	0	3	–	4	–	1
Southern Illinois	2	–	1	–	0	3	–	3	–	0
Eastern Illinois	1	–	2	–	0	1	–	3	–	0
Western Illinois	0	–	4	–	0	0	–	8	–	0
$ – Conference champion

The 1944 Northern Illinois State Huskies football team represented Northern Illinois State Teachers College—now known as Northern Illinois University—as a member of the Illinois Intercollegiate Athletic Conference (IIAC) during the 1944 college football season. Led by 16th-year head coach Chick Evans, the Huskies compiled an overall record of 7–0 with a mark of 3–0 in conference play, winning the IIAC title. The team played home games at the 5,500-seat Glidden Field, located on the east end of campus, in DeKalb, Illinois.

== Schedule ==
Date	Opponent	Site	Result	Source
September 30	at Elmhurst*	Elmhurst, IL	W 6–0	
October 7	Eastern Illinois	Glidden Field; DeKalb, IL	W 25–6	
October 14	Elmhurst*^{†}	Glidden Field; DeKalb, IL	W 25–12	
October 21	at Western Illinois	Macomb, IL	W 13–6	
October 28	at Concordia (IL)*	River Forest, IL	W 12–6	
November 4	Wheaton (IL)*	Glidden Field; DeKalb, IL	W 19–6	
November 10	at Southern Illinois	McAndrew Stadium; Carbondale, IL	W 13–12	
*Non-conference game; ^{†}Homecoming
