= 1944 Eastern Illinois Panthers football team =

American college football season

1944 Eastern Illinois Panthers football
- Conference: Illinois Intercollegiate Athletic Conference
- Record: 1–3 (1–2 IIAC)
- Head coach: Charles Lantz (1st season)
- Home stadium: Schahrer Field

1944 Illinois Intercollegiate Athletic Conference football standings
	Conf.					Overall
Team	W		L		T	W		L		T
Northern Illinois State $	3	–	0	–	0	7	–	0	–	0
Illinois State Normal	1	–	0	–	0	3	–	4	–	1
Southern Illinois	2	–	1	–	0	3	–	3	–	0
Eastern Illinois	1	–	2	–	0	1	–	3	–	0
Western Illinois	0	–	4	–	0	0	–	8	–	0
$ – Conference champion

The 1944 Eastern Illinois Panthers football team represented Eastern Illinois University as a member of the Illinois Intercollegiate Athletic Conference (IIAC) during the 1944 college football season. The team was led by first-year head coach Charles Lantz and played their home games at Schahrer Field in Charleston, Illinois. The Panthers finished the season with a 1–3 record overall and a 1–2 record in conference play.

== Schedule ==
Date	Opponent	Site	Result	Source
September 23	Western Illinois	Schahrer Field; Charleston, IL	W 12–0	
September 30	at Southern Illinois	McAndrew Stadium; Carbondale, IL	L 12–15	
October 7	at Northern Illinois State	Glidden Field; DeKalb, IL	L 6–25	
October 14	Illinois Wesleyan*^{†}	Schahrer Field; Charleston, IL	L 7–40	
*Non-conference game; ^{†}Homecoming
