= 1944 Central Michigan Chippewas football team =

American college football season

1944 Central Michigan Chippewas football
- Conference: Independent
- Record: 5–2
- Head coach: Ron Finch (8th season)
- Home stadium: Alumni Field

1944 Midwestern college football independents records
| | Conf. | | | Overall |
| Team | W | L | T | W | | L | | T |
|---|---|---|---|---|---|---|---|---|
| Miami (OH) | | – | | 8 | – | 1 | – | 0 |
| Michigan State | | – | | 6 | – | 1 | – | 0 |
| No. 9 Notre Dame | | – | | 8 | – | 2 | – | 0 |
| Central Michigan | | – | | 5 | – | 2 | – | 0 |
| Wichita | | – | | 5 | – | 2 | – | 1 |
| Bowling Green | | – | | 5 | – | 3 | – | 0 |
| Western Michigan | | – | | 4 | – | 3 | – | 0 |
| Wayne | | – | | 1 | – | 1 | – | 0 |
| Ohio Wesleyan | | – | | 1 | – | 8 | – | 1 |
| Marquette | | – | | 1 | – | 7 | – | 0 |
Rankings from AP Poll

The 1944 Central Michigan Chippewas football team represented Central Michigan College of Education, later renamed Central Michigan University, as an independent during the 1944 college football season. In their eighth season under head coach Ron Finch, the Chippewas compiled a 5–2 record and outscored all opponents by a combined total of 150 to 106. The team's two losses were to Bowling Green and Western Michigan.

== Schedule ==
| Date | Opponent | Site | Result |
|---|---|---|---|
| August 25 | at Alma | Alma, MI | W 20–13 |
| September 1 | Bowling Green | Alumni Field; Mount Pleasant, MI | L 19–20 |
| September 15 | Alma | Alumni Field; Mount Pleasant, MI | W 33–13 |
| September 23 | Indiana State | Alumni Field; Mount Pleasant, MI | W 25–0 |
| September 29 | at Michigan JV | Ferry Field; Ann Arbor, MI | W 14–13 |
| October 7 | at Western Michigan | Waldo Stadium; Kalamazoo, MI (rivalry) | L 14–35 |
| October 14 | at Michigan JV | Ann Arbor, MI | W 25–12 |
