= John J. Weinheimer =

American football player and coach

Biographical details
- Born: c. 1896
- Died: December 18, 1951 (aged 55); New York, New York, U.S.

Playing career
- 1916: NYU
- 1919–1921: NYU

Coaching career (HC unless noted)
- 1922–1943: NYU (assistant)
- 1944–1946: NYU

Head coaching record
- Overall: 10–12

John J. Weinheimer (c. 1896 – December 18, 1951) was an American college football player and coach. He served as the head football coach at New York University from 1944 to 1946, compiling a record of 10–12. Weinheimer played football and other sports at NYU. He was awarded a place in NYU's Athletic Hall of Fame for his playing and coaching efforts. Weinheimer died at the age of 55 on December 18, 1951, of a heart attack at his home in New York City.

== Head coaching record ==
Year	Team	Overall	Conference	Standing	Bowl/playoffs
NYU Violets (Independent) (1944–1946)
1944	NYU	2–5			
1945	NYU	3–4			
1946	NYU	5–3			
NYU:		10–12			
Total:		10–12			
