= 1944 Brown Bears football team =

American college football season

1944 Brown Bears football
- Conference: Independent
- Record: 3–4–1
- Head coach: Rip Engle (1st season)
- Captain: R. E. Lowe
- Home stadium: Brown Stadium

1944 Eastern college football independents records
	Conf.			Overall
Team	W	L	T	W		L		T
No. 1 Army		–		9	–	0	–	0
Yale		–		7	–	0	–	1
Harvard		–		5	–	1	–	0
Bucknell		–		7	–	2	–	1
Penn State		–		6	–	3	–	0
Penn		–		5	–	3	–	0
Boston College		–		4	–	3	–	0
Cornell		–		5	–	4	–	0
Villanova		–		4	–	4	–	0
Drexel		–		2	–	2	–	0
Pittsburgh		–		4	–	5	–	0
Brown		–		3	–	4	–	1
Temple		–		2	–	4	–	2
Syracuse		–		2	–	4	–	1
Princeton		–		1	–	2	–	0
Dartmouth		–		2	–	5	–	1
Colgate		–		2	–	5	–	0
NYU		–		2	–	5	–	0
Columbia		–		2	–	6	–	0
Tufts		–		1	–	4	–	1
Franklin & Marshall		–		1	–	8	–	0
CCNY		–		0	–	7	–	0
Rankings from AP Poll

The 1944 Brown Bears football team represented Brown University during the 1944 college football season.

In their first season under head coach Charles "Rip" Engle, the Bears compiled a 3–4–1 record, and were outscored 150 to 132 by opponents. R.E. Lowe was the team captain.

Brown played its home games at Brown Stadium in Providence, Rhode Island.

== Schedule ==
Date	Opponent	Site	Result	Attendance	Source
September 30	Tufts	Brown Stadium; Providence, RI	W 44–0	7,000	
October 7	at Army	Michie Stadium; West Point, NY	L 7–59	3,500	
October 21	at Holy Cross	Fitton Field; Worcester, MA	T 24–24	5,000	
October 28	Dartmouth	Brown Stadium; Providence, RI	L 13–14	8,000	
November 4	Coast Guard	Brown Stadium; Providence, RI	L 0–20	10,000	
November 11	at Yale	Yale Bowl; New Haven, CT	L 0–13	12,000	
November 18	at Columbia	Baker Field; New York, NY	W 12–0	12,000	
November 25	Colgate	Brown Stadium; Providence, RI	W 32–20	12,000	
