= 1944 Rutgers Queensmen football team =

American college football season

1944 Rutgers Queensmen football
- Conference: Middle Three Conference
- Record: 3–2 (2–2 Middle Three)
- Head coach: Harry Rockafeller (7th season)
- Captain: Joseph E. D'Imperio
- Home stadium: Rutgers Stadium

1944 Middle Three Conference football standings
	Conf.					Overall
Team	W		L		T	W		L		T
Lafayette $	4	–	0	–	0	6	–	1	–	0
Rutgers	2	–	2	–	0	3	–	2	–	0
Lehigh	0	–	4	–	0	0	–	6	–	0
$ – Conference champion

The 1944 Rutgers Queensmen football team represented Rutgers University in the 1944 college football season. In their seventh season under head coach Harry Rockafeller, the Queensmen compiled a 3–2 record and were outscored by their opponents 82 to 58.

== Schedule ==
Date	Opponent	Site	Result	Attendance	Source
October 28	at Lafayette	Fisher Field; Easton, PA	L 6–19	4,000	
November 4	at Lehigh	Taylor Stadium; Bethlehem, PA	W 19–6	2,200	
November 11	Lafayette	Rutgers Stadium; Piscataway, NJ	L 0–39	5,000	
November 18	Rutgers ASTP*	Rutgers Stadium; Piscataway, NJ	W 18–12	500	
November 24	Lehigh	Rutgers Stadium; Piscataway, NJ	W 15–6	3,000	
*Non-conference game
