= 1944 Temple Owls football team =

American college football season

1944 Temple Owls football
- Conference: Independent
- Record: 2–4–2
- Head coach: Ray Morrison (5th season)
- Home stadium: Temple Stadium

1944 Eastern college football independents records
	Conf.			Overall
Team	W	L	T	W		L		T
No. 1 Army		–		9	–	0	–	0
Yale		–		7	–	0	–	1
Harvard		–		5	–	1	–	0
Bucknell		–		7	–	2	–	1
Penn State		–		6	–	3	–	0
Penn		–		5	–	3	–	0
Boston College		–		4	–	3	–	0
Cornell		–		5	–	4	–	0
Villanova		–		4	–	4	–	0
Drexel		–		2	–	2	–	0
Pittsburgh		–		4	–	5	–	0
Brown		–		3	–	4	–	1
Temple		–		2	–	4	–	2
Syracuse		–		2	–	4	–	1
Princeton		–		1	–	2	–	0
Dartmouth		–		2	–	5	–	1
Colgate		–		2	–	5	–	0
NYU		–		2	–	5	–	0
Columbia		–		2	–	6	–	0
Tufts		–		1	–	4	–	1
Franklin & Marshall		–		1	–	8	–	0
CCNY		–		0	–	7	–	0
Rankings from AP Poll

The 1944 Temple Owls football team was an American football team that represented Temple University as an independent during the 1944 college football season. In its fifth season under head coach Ray Morrison, the team compiled a 2–4–2 record and was outscored by a total of 96 to 93. The team played its home games at Temple Stadium in Philadelphia.

== Schedule ==
Date	Opponent	Site	Result	Attendance	Source
September 29	Swarthmore	Temple Stadium; Philadelphia, PA	W 34–12	10,000	
October 6	Holy Cross	Temple Stadium; Philadelphia, PA	L 0–30	12,000	
October 14	at NYU	Ohio Field; Bronx, NY	W 25–0	4,000	
October 20	Syracuse	Temple Stadium; Philadelphia, PA	T 7–7	200	
October 27	Bucknell	Temple Stadium; Philadelphia, PA	T 7–7	8,000	
November 4	at West Virginia	Mountaineer Field; Morgantown, WV	L 0–6	6,000	
November 11	Penn State	Temple Stadium; Philadelphia, PA	L 6–7	12,000	
November 18	at No. 17 Tennessee	Shields–Watkins Field; Knoxville, TN	L 14–27	15,000	
Rankings from AP Poll released prior to the game
