= 1944 NYU Violets football team =

American college football season

1944 NYU Violets football
- Conference: Independent
- Record: 2–5
- Head coach: John J. Weinheimer (1st season)
- Home stadium: Ohio Field

1944 Eastern college football independents records
	Conf.			Overall
Team	W	L	T	W		L		T
No. 1 Army		–		9	–	0	–	0
Yale		–		7	–	0	–	1
Harvard		–		5	–	1	–	0
Bucknell		–		7	–	2	–	1
Penn State		–		6	–	3	–	0
Penn		–		5	–	3	–	0
Boston College		–		4	–	3	–	0
Cornell		–		5	–	4	–	0
Villanova		–		4	–	4	–	0
Drexel		–		2	–	2	–	0
Pittsburgh		–		4	–	5	–	0
Brown		–		3	–	4	–	1
Temple		–		2	–	4	–	2
Syracuse		–		2	–	4	–	1
Princeton		–		1	–	2	–	0
Dartmouth		–		2	–	5	–	1
Colgate		–		2	–	5	–	0
NYU		–		2	–	5	–	0
Columbia		–		2	–	6	–	0
Tufts		–		1	–	4	–	1
Franklin & Marshall		–		1	–	8	–	0
CCNY		–		0	–	7	–	0
Rankings from AP Poll

The 1944 NYU Violets football team was an American football team that represented New York University as an independent during the 1944 college football season.

In their first season under head coach John J. Weinheimer, the Violets compiled a 2–5 record and were outscored 160–71.

The Violets took the field in October 1944 after a two-year absence from the gridiron. NYU officials said they had dropped the sport because of a dip in enrollment during World War II and because the most recent two seasons, 1940 and 1941, had lost $65,000. Students successfully petitioned to bring back the sport.

Not all aspects of the prewar program were restored: head coach Mal Stevens was no longer under contract, and was serving in the Navy Medical Corps. His replacement was John "Jacko" Weinheimer, a 1920s Violets football captain. The schedule no longer featured matchups at Yankee Stadium with big-name programs from across the United States. Instead, NYU faced only smaller colleges in New York City and the Northeast.

The team played its home games at Ohio Field on NYU's University Heights campus in The Bronx borough of New York City.

== Schedule ==
Date	Opponent	Site	Result	Attendance	Source
October 7	Lafayette	Ohio Field; Bronx, NY	L 0–39	4,000	
October 14	Temple	Ohio Field; Bronx, NY	L 0–25	4,000	
October 20	at Boston College	Fenway Park; Boston, MA	L 13–42	5,000	
October 28	CCNY	Ohio Field; Bronx, NY	W 45–0	4,000	
November 4	at Bucknell	Memorial Stadium; Lewisburg, PA	L 0–26		
November 11	Swarthmore	Ohio Field; Bronx, NY	L 0–21	5,000	
November 18	Brooklyn	Ohio Field; Bronx, NY	W 13–7	6,000	
