= 1944 Southern Illinois Maroons football team =

American college football season

1944 Southern Illinois Maroons football
- Conference: Illinois Intercollegiate Athletic Conference
- Record: 3–3 (2–1 IIAC)
- Head coach: Glenn Martin (5th season)
- Home stadium: McAndrew Stadium

1944 Illinois Intercollegiate Athletic Conference football standings
| | Conf. | | | | | Overall |
| Team | W | | L | | T | W | | L | | T |
|---|---|---|---|---|---|---|---|---|---|---|
| Northern Illinois State $ | 3 | – | 0 | – | 0 | 7 | – | 0 | – | 0 |
| Illinois State Normal | 1 | – | 0 | – | 0 | 3 | – | 4 | – | 1 |
| Southern Illinois | 2 | – | 1 | – | 0 | 3 | – | 3 | – | 0 |
| Eastern Illinois | 1 | – | 2 | – | 0 | 1 | – | 3 | – | 0 |
| Western Illinois | 0 | – | 4 | – | 0 | 0 | – | 8 | – | 0 |
$ – Conference champion

The 1944 Southern Illinois Maroons football team was an American football team that represented Southern Illinois Normal University (now known as Southern Illinois University Carbondale) in the Illinois Intercollegiate Athletic Conference (IIAC) during the 1944 college football season. Under fifth-year head coach Glenn Martin, the team compiled a 3–3 record. The team played its home games at McAndrew Stadium in Carbondale, Illinois.

== Schedule ==
| Date | Opponent | Site | Result | Attendance | Source |
|---|---|---|---|---|---|
| September 30 | Eastern Illinois | McAndrew Stadium; Carbondale, IL | W 15–12 | | |
| October 7 | at Indiana State* | Terre Haute, IN | L 6–55 | | |
| October 14 | at Western Illinois | Morgan Field; Macomb, IL | W 25–6 | | |
| October 28 | Western Illinois^{†} | McAndrew Stadium; Carbondale, IL | W 39–0 | 2,200 | |
| November 4 | at Southeast Missouri State* | Houck Stadium; Cape Girardeau, MO | L 7–26 | | |
| November 10 | Northern Illinois State | McAndrew Stadium; Carbondale, IL | L 12–13 | | |
*Non-conference game; ^{†}Homecoming
