= 1944 Michigan State Spartans football team =

American college football season

1944 Michigan State Spartans football
- Conference: Independent
- Record: 6-1
- Head coach: Charlie Bachman (8th season)
- MVP: Jack Breslin
- Captain: Thomas B. Sullivan
- Home stadium: Macklin Field

1944 Midwestern college football independents records
	Conf.			Overall
Team	W	L	T	W		L		T
Miami (OH)		–		8	–	1	–	0
Michigan State		–		6	–	1	–	0
No. 9 Notre Dame		–		8	–	2	–	0
Central Michigan		–		5	–	2	–	0
Wichita		–		5	–	2	–	1
Bowling Green		–		5	–	3	–	0
Western Michigan		–		4	–	3	–	0
Wayne		–		1	–	1	–	0
Ohio Wesleyan		–		1	–	8	–	1
Marquette		–		1	–	7	–	0
Rankings from AP Poll

The 1944 Michigan State Spartans football team represented Michigan State College as an independent in the 1944 college football season. In their 11th season under head coach Charlie Bachman, the Spartans compiled a 6–1 record. The 1944 Spartans lost only to Missouri by a 13 to 7 score. The team did not play its annual rivalry game with Michigan.

== Schedule ==
Date	Opponent	Site	Result	Attendance	Source
September 30	Scranton	Macklin Field; East Lansing, MI	W 40–12	7,164	
October 7	at Kentucky	McLean Stadium; Lexington, KY	W 2–0	10,000	
October 14	Kansas State	Macklin Field; East Lansing, MI	W 45–6	7,000	
October 20	at Maryland	Byrd Stadium; College Park, MD	W 8–0	500	
October 27	at Wayne	University of Detroit Stadium; Detroit, MI	W 32–0	10,500	
November 4	at Missouri	Memorial Stadium; Columbia, MO	L 7–13	5,000	
November 11	Maryland^{†}	Macklin Field; East Lansing, MI	W 33–0	8,160	
^{†}Homecoming
