= 1944 Illinois State Normal Redbirds football team =

American college football season

1944 Illinois State Normal Redbirds football
- Conference: Illinois Intercollegiate Athletic Conference
- Record: 3–4–1 (1–0–0 IIAC)
- Head coach: Howard Hancock (14th season)
- Home stadium: McCormick Field

1944 Illinois Intercollegiate Athletic Conference football standings
	Conf.					Overall
Team	W		L		T	W		L		T
Northern Illinois State $	3	–	0	–	0	7	–	0	–	0
Illinois State Normal	1	–	0	–	0	3	–	4	–	1
Southern Illinois	2	–	1	–	0	3	–	3	–	0
Eastern Illinois	1	–	2	–	0	1	–	3	–	0
Western Illinois	0	–	4	–	0	0	–	8	–	0
$ – Conference champion

The 1944 Illinois State Normal Redbirds football team represented Illinois State Normal University — now known as Illinois State University — as a member of the Illinois Intercollegiate Athletic Conference (IIAC) during the 1944 college football season. The team was led by fourteenth-year head coach Howard Hancock and played its home games at McCormick Field. The Redbirds finished the season with a 3–4–1 overall record; they only played one game against a conference opponent, a victory over Western Illinois.

== Schedule ==
Date	Opponent	Site	Result	Attendance	Source
September 16	at Illinois*	Memorial Stadium; Champaign, IL	L 0–79	5,386	
September 23	Wabash*	McCormick Field; Normal, IL	T 7–7		
September 30	at Indiana State*	Terre Haute, IN	L 13–33		
October 7	DePauw*	McCormick Field; Normal, IL	W 31–13		
October 13	at Southeast Missouri State*	Houck Stadium; Cape Girardeau, MO	W 13–12		
October 21	Indiana State*^{†}	McCormick Field; Normal, IL	L 7–13	3,500	
November 4	Western Illinois	McCormick Field; Normal, IL	W 26–6		
November 11	at Illinois Wesleyan*	Wesleyan Stadium; Bloomington, IL	L 0–19		
*Non-conference game; ^{†}Homecoming
