= 1944 Western Michigan Broncos football team =

American college football season

1944 Western Michigan Broncos football
- Conference: Independent
- Record: 4–3
- Head coach: John Gill (3rd season)
- MVP: Glenn Rodney
- Captain: Dick Leahy
- Home stadium: Waldo Stadium

1944 Midwestern college football independents records
	Conf.			Overall
Team	W	L	T	W		L		T
Miami (OH)		–		8	–	1	–	0
Michigan State		–		6	–	1	–	0
No. 9 Notre Dame		–		8	–	2	–	0
Central Michigan		–		5	–	2	–	0
Wichita		–		5	–	2	–	1
Bowling Green		–		5	–	3	–	0
Western Michigan		–		4	–	3	–	0
Wayne		–		1	–	1	–	0
Ohio Wesleyan		–		1	–	8	–	1
Marquette		–		1	–	7	–	0
Rankings from AP Poll

The 1944 Western Michigan Broncos football team represented Michigan College of Education (later renamed Western Michigan University) as an independent during the 1944 college football season. In their third season under head coach John Gill, the Broncos compiled a 4–3 record and outscored their opponents, 162 to 123. The team played its home games at Waldo Stadium in Kalamazoo, Michigan.

Guard Dick Leahy was the team captain. Tackle Glenn Rodney received the team's most outstanding player award.

== Schedule ==
Date	Opponent	Site	Result
September 9	Fort Sheridan	Waldo Stadium; Kalamazoo, MI	W 67–6
September 16	Wabash	Waldo Stadium; Kalamazoo, MI	W 20–0
September 23	Bunker Hill NAS	Waldo Stadium; Kalamazoo, MI	L 7–33
September 30	at Miami (OH)	Miami Field; Oxford, OH	L 6–32
October 7	Central Michigan	Waldo Stadium; Kalamazoo, MI (rivalry)	W 35–14
October 14	at No. 5 Great Lakes Navy	Great Lakes, IL	L 0–38
October 20	at Wooster	Ross Field; Wooster, OH	W 27–0
Rankings from AP Poll released prior to the game
