= 1944 Villanova Wildcats football team =

American college football season

1944 Villanova Wildcats football
- Conference: Independent
- Record: 4–4
- Head coach: Jordan Olivar (2nd season)
- Captain: William Williams
- Home stadium: Shibe Park

1944 Eastern college football independents records
	Conf.			Overall
Team	W	L	T	W		L		T
No. 1 Army		–		9	–	0	–	0
Yale		–		7	–	0	–	1
Harvard		–		5	–	1	–	0
Bucknell		–		7	–	2	–	1
Penn State		–		6	–	3	–	0
Penn		–		5	–	3	–	0
Boston College		–		4	–	3	–	0
Cornell		–		5	–	4	–	0
Villanova		–		4	–	4	–	0
Drexel		–		2	–	2	–	0
Pittsburgh		–		4	–	5	–	0
Brown		–		3	–	4	–	1
Temple		–		2	–	4	–	2
Syracuse		–		2	–	4	–	1
Princeton		–		1	–	2	–	0
Dartmouth		–		2	–	5	–	1
Colgate		–		2	–	5	–	0
NYU		–		2	–	5	–	0
Columbia		–		2	–	6	–	0
Tufts		–		1	–	4	–	1
Franklin & Marshall		–		1	–	8	–	0
CCNY		–		0	–	7	–	0
Rankings from AP Poll

The 1944 Villanova Wildcats football team represented the Villanova University during the 1944 college football season. The head coach was Jordan Olivar, coaching his second season with the Wildcats. The team played their home games at Villanova Stadium in Villanova, Pennsylvania.

== Schedule ==
Date	Time	Opponent	Site	Result	Attendance	Source
September 23		at Scranton	Scranton, PA	W 13–7		
September 30		at Franklin & Marshall*	Lancaster, PA	W 14–6		
October 7	8:45 p.m.	Sampson NTS	Shibe Park; Philadelphia, PA	W 7–6	12,000	
October 15		at Holy Cross	Fitton Field; Worcester, MA	L 0–26	32,000	
October 28		Muhlenberg	Shibe Park; Philadelphia, PA	W 7–0		
November 4		at No. 1 Army	Michie Stadium; West Point, NY	L 0–83		
November 10	8:45 p.m.	Atlantic City NAS	Shibe Park; Philadelphia, PA	L 6–25	5,000	
November 18		Bucknell	Shibe Park; Philadelphia, PA	L 6–27	5,000	
*Non-conference game; Rankings from AP Poll released prior to the game; All times are in Eastern time
