= 1944 Lafayette Leopards football team =

American football club

1944 Lafayette Leopards football

Middle Three champion
- Conference: Middle Three Conference
- Record: 6–1 (4–0 Middle Three)
- Head coach: Ben Wolfson (2nd season)
- Captain: Edward Podgorski
- Home stadium: Fisher Field

1944 Middle Three Conference football standings
	Conf.					Overall
Team	W		L		T	W		L		T
Lafayette $	4	–	0	–	0	6	–	1	–	0
Rutgers	2	–	2	–	0	3	–	2	–	0
Lehigh	0	–	4	–	0	0	–	6	–	0
$ – Conference champion

The 1944 Lafayette Leopards football team was an American football team that represented Lafayette College in the Middle Three Conference during the 1944 college football season. In its second season under head coach Ben Wolfson, the team compiled a 6–1 record and won the Middle Three championship. Edward Podgorski was the team captain. The team played home games at Fisher Field in Easton, Pennsylvania.

== Schedule ==
Date	Opponent	Site	Result	Attendance	Source
October 7	at NYU*	Ohio Field; Bronx, NY	W 39–0	4,000	
October 14	at Syracuse*	Archbold Stadium; Syracuse, NY	L 7–32	5,000	
October 21	at Lehigh	Taylor Stadium; Bethlethem, PA (rivalry)	W 44–0	500	
October 28	at Rutgers	Fisher Field; Easton, PA	W 19–6	4,000	
November 4	Ursinus*	Fisher Field; Easton, PA	W 34–21		
November 11	at Rutgers	Rutgers Stadium; Piscataway, NJ	W 39–0	5,000	
November 18	Lehigh	Fisher Field; Easton, PA (rivalry)	W 64–0	10,000	
*Non-conference game
