= 1944 Syracuse Orangemen football team =

American college football season

1944 Syracuse Orangemen football
- Conference: Independent
- Record: 2–4–1
- Head coach: Ossie Solem (7th season)
- Captain: Victor Merkel
- Home stadium: Archbold Stadium

1944 Eastern college football independents records
	Conf.			Overall
Team	W	L	T	W		L		T
No. 1 Army		–		9	–	0	–	0
Yale		–		7	–	0	–	1
Harvard		–		5	–	1	–	0
Bucknell		–		7	–	2	–	1
Penn State		–		6	–	3	–	0
Penn		–		5	–	3	–	0
Boston College		–		4	–	3	–	0
Cornell		–		5	–	4	–	0
Villanova		–		4	–	4	–	0
Drexel		–		2	–	2	–	0
Pittsburgh		–		4	–	5	–	0
Brown		–		3	–	4	–	1
Temple		–		2	–	4	–	2
Syracuse		–		2	–	4	–	1
Princeton		–		1	–	2	–	0
Dartmouth		–		2	–	5	–	1
Colgate		–		2	–	5	–	0
NYU		–		2	–	5	–	0
Columbia		–		2	–	6	–	0
Tufts		–		1	–	4	–	1
Franklin & Marshall		–		1	–	8	–	0
CCNY		–		0	–	7	–	0
Rankings from AP Poll

The 1944 Syracuse Orangemen football team represented Syracuse University as an independent during the 1944 college football season. The Orangemen were led by seventh-year head coach Ossie Solem and played their home games at Archbold Stadium in Syracuse, New York. Syracuse resumed play after taking a hiatus during the 1943 season due to World War II. They finished the season with a record of 2–4–1.

== Schedule ==
Date	Opponent	Site	Result	Attendance	Source
September 23	Cornell	Archbold Stadium; Syracuse, NY	L 6–39	22,000	
October 7	at Columbia	Baker Field; New York, NY	L 2–26	18,000	
October 14	Lafayette	Archbold Stadium; Syracuse, NY	W 32–7	5,000	
October 21	at Temple	Temple Stadium; Philadelphia, PA	T 7–7	200	
October 28	at Boston College	Fenway Park; Boston, MA	L 12–19	6,500	
November 4	Penn State	Archbold Stadium; Syracuse, NY (rivalry)	L 0–41		
November 18	Colgate	Archbold Stadium; Syracuse, NY (rivalry)	W 43–13	15,000	
