= 1944 Army Cadets football team =

American college football season

1944 Army Cadets football

AP Poll national champion Eastern champion
- Conference: Independent

Ranking
- AP: No. 1
- Record: 9–0
- Head coach: Earl Blaik (4th season)
- Captain: Tom Lombardo
- Home stadium: Michie Stadium

1944 Eastern college football independents records
	Conf.			Overall
Team	W	L	T	W		L		T
No. 1 Army		–		9	–	0	–	0
Yale		–		7	–	0	–	1
Harvard		–		5	–	1	–	0
Bucknell		–		7	–	2	–	1
Penn State		–		6	–	3	–	0
Penn		–		5	–	3	–	0
Boston College		–		4	–	3	–	0
Cornell		–		5	–	4	–	0
Villanova		–		4	–	4	–	0
Drexel		–		2	–	2	–	0
Pittsburgh		–		4	–	5	–	0
Brown		–		3	–	4	–	1
Temple		–		2	–	4	–	2
Syracuse		–		2	–	4	–	1
Princeton		–		1	–	2	–	0
Dartmouth		–		2	–	5	–	1
Colgate		–		2	–	5	–	0
NYU		–		2	–	5	–	0
Columbia		–		2	–	6	–	0
Tufts		–		1	–	4	–	1
Franklin & Marshall		–		1	–	8	–	0
CCNY		–		0	–	7	–	0
Rankings from AP Poll

The 1944 Army Cadets football team was an American football team that represented the United States Military Academy as an independent during the 1944 college football season. In their fourth season under head coach Earl Blaik, the Cadets compiled a perfect 9–0 record and outscored opponents by a total of 504 to 35. Army's 1944 season was part of a 32-game undefeated streak that included the entire 1944, 1945, and 1946 seasons.

In the final AP Poll released on December 5, Army was ranked No. 1 nationally with 1,165 points, more than 200 points ahead of No. 2 Ohio State. Army was also recognized as the 1944 national champion by most other selectors, both at the time and retroactively in later decades, including the Billingsley Report, Boand System, College Football Researchers Association, Dunkel System, Helms Athletic Foundation, Houlgate System, National Championship Foundation, Poling System, and Sagarin Ratings. Army also won the Lambert Trophy as the best football team in the east.

Army halfback Glenn Davis received the Maxwell Award as the best college football player of 1944. Davis and fullback Doc Blanchard were selected as consensus first-team players on the 1944 All-America college football team.

Six persons affiliated with the 1944 Army team were later inducted into the College Football Hall of Fame: head coach Blaik (inducted 1964); Blanchard (inducted 1959); Davis (inducted 1961); end Barney Poole (inducted 1974); quarterback Doug Kenna (inducted 1984); and guard John Green (inducted 1989).

The team captain was Tom Lombardo. Other notable players included tackle Tex Coulter, guard Joe Stanowicz, and center Robert St. Onge.

Color photographs of the 1944 season, including the Army–Navy game at Baltimore’s Municipal Stadium, survive in a private collection.

== Schedule ==
Date	Opponent	Rank	Site	Result	Attendance	Source
September 30	North Carolina		Michie Stadium; West Point, NY	W 46–0	7,000	
October 7	Brown		Michie Stadium; West Point, NY	W 59–7	3,500	
October 14	Pittsburgh	No. 3	Michie Stadium; West Point, NY	W 69–7	10,000	
October 21	Coast Guard	No. 2	Michie Stadium; West Point, NY	W 76–0	3,000	
October 28	vs. Duke	No. 2	Polo Grounds; New York, NY	W 27–7	45,000	
November 4	Villanova	No. 1	Michie Stadium; West Point, NY	W 83–0		
November 11	vs. No. 5 Notre Dame	No. 1	Yankee Stadium; Bronx, NY (rivalry)	W 59–0	74,437	
November 18	at Penn	No. 1	Franklin Field; Philadelphia, PA	W 62–7	65,000	
December 2	vs. No. 2 Navy	No. 1	Municipal Stadium; Baltimore, MD (Army–Navy Game)	W 23–7	70,000	
Rankings from AP Poll released prior to the game

== Rankings ==
Ranking movements Legend: ██ Increase in ranking ██ Decrease in ranking ( ) = First-place votes
	Week								
Poll	1	2	3	4	5	6	7	8	Final
AP	3 (3)	2 (11.67)	2 (30)	1 (41)	1 (58)	1 (77)	1 (65.33)	1 (55.33)	1 (95)
