= 1944 CCNY Beavers football team =

American college football season

1944 CCNY Beavers football
- Conference: Independent
- Record: 0–7
- Head coach: Leo Miller (2nd season)
- Home stadium: Lewisohn Stadium

1944 Eastern college football independents records
	Conf.			Overall
Team	W	L	T	W		L		T
No. 1 Army		–		9	–	0	–	0
Yale		–		7	–	0	–	1
Harvard		–		5	–	1	–	0
Bucknell		–		7	–	2	–	1
Penn State		–		6	–	3	–	0
Penn		–		5	–	3	–	0
Boston College		–		4	–	3	–	0
Cornell		–		5	–	4	–	0
Villanova		–		4	–	4	–	0
Drexel		–		2	–	2	–	0
Pittsburgh		–		4	–	5	–	0
Brown		–		3	–	4	–	1
Temple		–		2	–	4	–	2
Syracuse		–		2	–	4	–	1
Princeton		–		1	–	2	–	0
Dartmouth		–		2	–	5	–	1
Colgate		–		2	–	5	–	0
NYU		–		2	–	5	–	0
Columbia		–		2	–	6	–	0
Tufts		–		1	–	4	–	1
Franklin & Marshall		–		1	–	8	–	0
CCNY		–		0	–	7	–	0
Rankings from AP Poll

The 1944 CCNY Beavers football team was an American football team that represented the City College of New York (CCNY) as an independent during the 1944 college football season. In their second season under head coach Leo Miller, the team compiled an 0–7 record.

== Schedule ==
Date	Opponent	Site	Result	Attendance	Source
October 7	Brooklyn	Lewisohn Stadium; New York, NY	L 0–37	6,000	
October 13	at Boston College	Braves Field; Boston, MA	L 0–33		
October 21	at Connecticut	Gardner Dow Athletic Fields; Storrs, CT	L 0–21		
October 28	at NYU	Ohio Field; Bronx, NY	L 0–45	4,000	
November 4	Connecticut	Lewisohn Stadium; New York, NY	L 0–52		
November 7	at Brooklyn	Kingsmen Field; Brooklyn, NY	L 0–37	3,000	
November 11	at Bucknell	Memorial Stadium; Lewisburg, PA	L 0–78		
