= 1944 Bucknell Bison football team =

American college football season

1944 Bucknell Bison football
- Conference: Independent
- Record: 7–2–1
- Head coach: J. Ellwood Ludwig (1st season)
- Captains: Ralph Grant; Gene Hubka
- Home stadium: Memorial Stadium

1944 Eastern college football independents records
	Conf.			Overall
Team	W	L	T	W		L		T
No. 1 Army		–		9	–	0	–	0
Yale		–		7	–	0	–	1
Harvard		–		5	–	1	–	0
Bucknell		–		7	–	2	–	1
Penn State		–		6	–	3	–	0
Penn		–		5	–	3	–	0
Boston College		–		4	–	3	–	0
Cornell		–		5	–	4	–	0
Villanova		–		4	–	4	–	0
Drexel		–		2	–	2	–	0
Pittsburgh		–		4	–	5	–	0
Brown		–		3	–	4	–	1
Temple		–		2	–	4	–	2
Syracuse		–		2	–	4	–	1
Princeton		–		1	–	2	–	0
Dartmouth		–		2	–	5	–	1
Colgate		–		2	–	5	–	0
NYU		–		2	–	5	–	0
Columbia		–		2	–	6	–	0
Tufts		–		1	–	4	–	1
Franklin & Marshall		–		1	–	8	–	0
CCNY		–		0	–	7	–	0
Rankings from AP Poll

The 1944 Bucknell Bison football team was an American football team that represented Bucknell University as an independent during the 1944 college football season.

In its first season under head coach J. Ellwood Ludwig, the team compiled a 7–2–1 record. Gene Hubka and Ralph Grant were the team captains.

The team played its home games at Memorial Stadium in Lewisburg, Pennsylvania.

== Schedule ==
Date	Opponent	Site	Result	Attendance	Source
September 16	at Muhlenberg	Scotty Wood Stadium; Allentown, PA	W 24–7	3,000	
September 23	Muhlenberg	Memorial Stadium; Lewisburg, PA	W 14–10		
September 30	at Cornell	Schoellkopf Field; Ithaca, NY	L 0–26	7,000	
October 7	Franklin & Marshall	Memorial Stadium; Lewisburg, PA	W 16–13		
October 14	at Penn State	New Beaver Field; State College, PA	L 6–20	8,000	
October 27	at Temple	Temple Stadium; Philadelphia, PA	T 7–7	8,000	
November 4	NYU	Memorial Stadium; Lewisburg, PA	W 26–0		
November 11	CCNY	Memorial Stadium; Lewisburg, PA	W 78–0		
November 17	at Villanova	Shibe Park; Philadelphia, PA	W 27–6	5,000	
November 23	at Franklin & Marshall	Sponaugle-Williamson Field; Lancaster, PA	W 6–0	5,000	
