= Bob Jenkins (American football) =

American football player (1923–2001)

Profile
- Position: Halfback

Personal information
- Born: August 16, 1923; Talladega, Alabama, U.S.
- Died: November 23, 2001 (aged 78)
- Listed height: 6 ft 1 in (1.85 m)
- Listed weight: 195 lb (88 kg)

Career information
- High school: Talladega High School
- College: Navy

Career history
- 1942: Alabama
- 1943–1945: Navy

Awards and highlights
- Consensus All-American, 1944; First-team All-Eastern (1944)

Robert Thomas "Trigger Tom" Jenkins (August 16, 1923 – November 23, 2001) was an American football halfback at University of Alabama and the United States Naval Academy. While at Navy he was a consensus All-American in 1944

== Early life ==
Jenkins was born in Talladega, Alabama on August 16, 1923 to William Thomas Jenkins and Pauline Odessa West Jenkins. He attended Talladega High School graduating as valedictorian in 1941. A gifted athlete Jenkins played high school football earning All-State and All-Southern in 1939 and 1940. During his final year he accounted for 24 touchdowns.

== Playing career ==
Jenkins lettered in football at the University of Alabama under coach Frank Thomas in 1942. In 1943 he moved on to United States Naval Academy where he lettered in football during the 1943, 1944, and 1945 seasons. In 1944, as a 6-foot 1-inch, 195-pound halfback, he was recognized as a consensus first-team All-American, having received first-team honors from several publications and organizations including the United Press and Collier's Weekly (Grantland Rice). The three other members of the 1944 consensus All-American backfield were Les Horvath, Doc Blanchard, and Glen Davis, who all won the Heisman Trophy in 1944, 1945, and 1946 respectively. While at Navy the media heaped colorful praise of his playing ability by writing he was a “human dynamo,” “190 lbs fluid force,” and “the piston-legged personification of power.” A knee injury in 1945 ended his football playing career. Jenkins was selected as the sixth pick in the 17th round (170th overall) by the Washington Redskins in the 1945 National Football League draft.

== After football ==
Jenkins stayed in the Navy until he retired in 1950. He moved to Birmingham, Alabama where he was a businessman and civic leader. In 1959, he founded machine tools business Birmingham called Modern Machinery Associates, Inc. He died on November 23, 2001.
