= 1944 Princeton Tigers football team =

American college football season

1944 Princeton Tigers football
- Conference: Independent
- Record: 1–2
- Head coach: Harry Mahnken (2nd season)
- Home stadium: Palmer Stadium

1944 Eastern college football independents records
	Conf.			Overall
Team	W	L	T	W		L		T
No. 1 Army		–		9	–	0	–	0
Yale		–		7	–	0	–	1
Harvard		–		5	–	1	–	0
Bucknell		–		7	–	2	–	1
Penn State		–		6	–	3	–	0
Penn		–		5	–	3	–	0
Boston College		–		4	–	3	–	0
Cornell		–		5	–	4	–	0
Villanova		–		4	–	4	–	0
Drexel		–		2	–	2	–	0
Pittsburgh		–		4	–	5	–	0
Brown		–		3	–	4	–	1
Temple		–		2	–	4	–	2
Syracuse		–		2	–	4	–	1
Princeton		–		1	–	2	–	0
Dartmouth		–		2	–	5	–	1
Colgate		–		2	–	5	–	0
NYU		–		2	–	5	–	0
Columbia		–		2	–	6	–	0
Tufts		–		1	–	4	–	1
Franklin & Marshall		–		1	–	8	–	0
CCNY		–		0	–	7	–	0
Rankings from AP Poll

The 1944 Princeton Tigers football team was an American football team that represented Princeton University as an independent during the 1944 college football season. In its second and final season under head coach Harry Mahnken, the team compiled a 1–2 record and was outscored by a total of 40 to 22. Princeton played its 1944 home games at Palmer Stadium in Princeton, New Jersey.

== Schedule ==
Date	Opponent	Site	Result	Source
November 11	Muhlenberg	Palmer Stadium; Princeton, NJ	W 16–6	
November 18	Swarthmore	Palmer Stadium; Princeton, NJ	L 0–3	
November 25	Atlantic City NAS	Palmer Stadium; Princeton, NJ	L 6–31	
