= 1944 Penn Quakers football team =

American college football season

1944 Penn Quakers football
- Conference: Independent
- Record: 5–3
- Head coach: George Munger (7th season)
- Home stadium: Franklin Field

1944 Eastern college football independents records
	Conf.			Overall
Team	W	L	T	W		L		T
No. 1 Army		–		9	–	0	–	0
Yale		–		7	–	0	–	1
Harvard		–		5	–	1	–	0
Bucknell		–		7	–	2	–	1
Penn State		–		6	–	3	–	0
Penn		–		5	–	3	–	0
Boston College		–		4	–	3	–	0
Cornell		–		5	–	4	–	0
Villanova		–		4	–	4	–	0
Drexel		–		2	–	2	–	0
Pittsburgh		–		4	–	5	–	0
Brown		–		3	–	4	–	1
Temple		–		2	–	4	–	2
Syracuse		–		2	–	4	–	1
Princeton		–		1	–	2	–	0
Dartmouth		–		2	–	5	–	1
Colgate		–		2	–	5	–	0
NYU		–		2	–	5	–	0
Columbia		–		2	–	6	–	0
Tufts		–		1	–	4	–	1
Franklin & Marshall		–		1	–	8	–	0
CCNY		–		0	–	7	–	0
Rankings from AP Poll

The 1944 Penn Quakers football team was an American football team that represented the University of Pennsylvania as an independent during the 1944 college football season. In its seventh season under head coach George Munger, the team compiled a 5–3 record and outscored opponents by a total of 165 to 149. The team played its home games at Franklin Field in Philadelphia.

== Schedule ==
Date	Opponent	Rank	Site	Result	Attendance	Source
September 30	Duke		Franklin Field; Philadelphia, PA	W 18–7	40,000	
October 7	Dartmouth		Franklin Field; Philadelphia, PA	W 20–6	40,000	
October 14	William & Mary	No. 9	Franklin Field; Philadelphia, PA	W 46–0	32,000	
October 28	No. 12 Navy	No. 7	Franklin Field; Philadelphia, PA	L 0–26	73,000	
November 4	No. 10 Michigan		Franklin Field; Philadelphia, PA	L 19–41	48,000	
November 11	Columbia		Franklin Field; Philadelphia, PA	W 35–7	40,000	
November 18	No. 1 Army		Franklin Field; Philadelphia, PA	L 7–62	65,000	
November 25	Cornell		Franklin Field; Philadelphia, PA (rivalry)	W 20–0	50,000	
Rankings from AP Poll released prior to the game

== Rankings ==
Ranking movements Legend: ██ Increase in ranking ██ Decrease in ranking — = Not ranked т = Tied with team above or below
	Week								
Poll	1	2	3	4	5	6	7	8	Final
AP	9	7	7т	—	—	—	—	—	—
