= 1944 Yale Bulldogs football team =

American college football season

1944 Yale Bulldogs football
- Conference: Independent
- Record: 7–0–1
- Head coach: Howie Odell (3rd season)
- Captain: Macauley Whiting
- Home stadium: Yale Bowl

1944 Eastern college football independents records
	Conf.			Overall
Team	W	L	T	W		L		T
No. 1 Army		–		9	–	0	–	0
Yale		–		7	–	0	–	1
Harvard		–		5	–	1	–	0
Bucknell		–		7	–	2	–	1
Penn State		–		6	–	3	–	0
Penn		–		5	–	3	–	0
Boston College		–		4	–	3	–	0
Cornell		–		5	–	4	–	0
Villanova		–		4	–	4	–	0
Drexel		–		2	–	2	–	0
Pittsburgh		–		4	–	5	–	0
Brown		–		3	–	4	–	1
Temple		–		2	–	4	–	2
Syracuse		–		2	–	4	–	1
Princeton		–		1	–	2	–	0
Dartmouth		–		2	–	5	–	1
Colgate		–		2	–	5	–	0
NYU		–		2	–	5	–	0
Columbia		–		2	–	6	–	0
Tufts		–		1	–	4	–	1
Franklin & Marshall		–		1	–	8	–	0
CCNY		–		0	–	7	–	0
Rankings from AP Poll

The 1944 Yale Bulldogs football team represented Yale University in the 1944 college football season. The Bulldogs were led by third-year head coach Howie Odell, played their home games at the Yale Bowl and finished the season with a 7–0–1 record.

== Schedule ==
Date	Opponent	Rank	Site	Result	Attendance	Source
September 30	Coast Guard		Yale Bowl; New Haven, CT	W 7–3	16,000	
October 7	Cornell		Yale Bowl; New Haven, CT	W 16–7	25,000	
October 14	Columbia		Yale Bowl; New Haven, CT	W 27–10	10,000	
October 28	Rochester		Yale Bowl; New Haven, CT	W 32–0	8,000	
November 4	Dartmouth		Yale Bowl; New Haven, CT	W 6–0	40,000	
November 11	Brown		Yale Bowl; New Haven, CT	W 13–0	12,000	
November 18	North Carolina	No. 20	Yale Bowl; New Haven, CT	W 13–6	10,000	
November 25	Virginia		Yale Bowl; New Haven, CT	T 6–6	18,000	
Rankings from AP Poll released prior to the game

== Rankings ==
Ranking movements Legend: ██ Increase in ranking ██ Decrease in ranking — = Not ranked т = Tied with team above or below
	Week								
Poll	1	2	3	4	5	6	7	8	Final
AP	—	—	—	—	—	20	—	18т	—

== NFL draft ==
The following Bulldog was selected in the National Football League draft following the season.

Round	Pick	Player	Position	NFL team
10	95	Paul Walker	E	Detroit Lions
