= 1944 college football season =

American college football season

- First AP No. 1 of season: Notre Dame
- Number of bowls: 5
- Champion: Army (AP)
- Heisman: Les Horvath (halfback/quarterback, Ohio State)

The 1944 college football season was the 76th season of intercollegiate football in the United States. Competition included schools from the Big Ten Conference, the Pacific Coast Conference (PCC), the Southeastern Conference (SEC), the Big Six Conference, the Southern Conference, the Southwestern Conference, and numerous smaller conferences and independent programs.

The season was played at the height of World War II, starting less than three months after the Normandy landings and as battles raged throughout Europe and the Pacific. As in 1943, the Associated Press poll included service teams, drawn from flight schools and training centers which were preparing men for fighting in the war. Half of the final top 20 teams were composed of service teams, in addition to the Army and Navy service academies. Many colleges that had suspended their programs in 1943 returned to competition in 1944, including the entire SEC.

The teams ranked highest in the final Associated Press poll in December 1944 were:

| Rank | Team | Record | Notes |
|---|---|---|---|
| 1 | Army | 9–0 | Voted No. 1 by 95 of 121 writers in the final AP poll. Halfback Glenn Davis led nation with 120 points scored and finished second in Heisman voting. Fullback Doc Blanchard finished third in Heisman voting. Davis and Blanchard were consensus All-Americans. The Cadets ranked No. 1 nationally in scoring offense (56.0 points per game), No. 2 in total offense (430.8 yards per game), and No. 4 in total defense (129.1 yards per game). |
| 2 | Ohio State | 9–0 | Big Ten champion. Halfback/quarterback Les Horvath won the 1944 Heisman Trophy. Horvath, guard Bill Hackett, and end Jack Dugger were consensus All-Americans. Retroactively selected national champion by National Championship Foundation and Sagarin Ratings. |
| 3 | Randolph Field | 9–0 | Texas air field team featuring Glenn Dobbs, Bill Dudley, Pete Layden. Ranked No. 2 nationally in total defense (110.8 yards per game) and scoring offense (42.3 points per game) and No. 3 in total offense (377.0 yards per game). Defeated Second Air Force in Treasury Bond Bowl. |
| 4 | Navy | 6–3 | Tackle Don Whitmire and halfback Bob Jenkins finished fourth and seventh, respectively, in Heisman Trophy voting. Whitmire and guard Ben Chase were consensus All-Americans. Ranked No. 2 nationally in rushing defense (allowing only 53.8 yards per game). |
| 5 | Bainbridge NTS | 10–0 | Naval training center in Maryland. Players included Charlie Justice. |
| 6 | Iowa Pre-Flight | 10–1 | Navy pre-flight school at University of Iowa. |
| 7 | USC | 7–0–2 | PCC champion. Shut out victory over Tennessee in 1945 Rose Bowl. Tackle John Ferraro was a consensus All-American. |
| 8 | Michigan | 8–2 | Fullback Don Lund team MVP. Tackle Milan Lazetich a second-team All-American. |
| 9 | Notre Dame | 8–2 | Halfback Bob Kelly finished fifth in Heisman Trophy voting. Halfback Creighton Miller was a consensus All-American. |
| 10 | March Field | 7–2–2 | Air Force base in Riverside, California. |

The year's statistical leaders included Bob Fenimore of Oklahoma A&M with 1,758 yards of total offense, Wayne Williams of Minnesota with 911 rushing yards, Paul Rickards of Pittsburgh with 997 passing yards, Reid Moseley of Georgia with 424 receiving yards, and Glenn Davis of Army with 120 points scored.

== Season timeline ==
=== September ===
On September 16 the Great Lakes Naval Training Center team defeated Fort Sheridan, 62–0, before a crowd of 25,000 at its base north of Chicago. Michigan beat Iowa Pre-Flight, 12–7 before a crowd of 22,000 in Ann Arbor.

September 23 Great Lakes won at Purdue, 27–18. In Milwaukee, Michigan beat Marquette 14–0. At San Antonio, Randolph Field defeated Abilene Field, 67–0.

September 30 Notre Dame won at Pittsburgh 58–0. Great Lakes and Illinois played to a 26–26 tie. Michigan lost to Indiana, 20–0. In Houston, Randolph Field beat Rice 59–0. Army beat North Carolina, 46–0. North Carolina Pre-Flight, quarterbacked by Otto Graham (formerly of Northwestern, and a future Cleveland Browns star) upset Navy, 21–14.

=== October ===
October 7 Notre Dame beat Tulane 26–0 and Army defeated Brown 59–7. In games between service teams and colleges, the servicemen triumphed, as North Carolina Pre-Flight won at Duke, 13–6, Great Lakes won at Northwestern 25–0, and Randolph Field won at Texas 42–6. In the poll that followed, Notre Dame was first and Army third, with service teams occupying the other spots in the top five: No. 2 North Carolina Pre-Flight, No. 4 Randolph Field, and No. 5 Great Lakes.

October 14 In Boston, No. 1 Notre Dame beat Dartmouth, 64–0. No. 2 North Carolina Pre-Flight was tied by Virginia, 13–13. No. 3 Army beat Pittsburgh, 69–7. No. 4 Randolph Field, quarterbacked by “Bullet Bill” Dudley, beat SMU at home in San Antonio, 41–0. No. 5 Great Lakes beat Western Michigan 38–0. No. 8 Ohio State won at No. 19 Wisconsin, 20–7 and No. 11 Iowa Pre-Flight won at No. 7 Purdue, 13–6. N.C. Pre-Flight and Great Lakes fell out of the top five, which was now No. 1 Notre Dame, No. 2 Army, No. 3 Randolph Field, No. 4 Ohio State, and No. 5 Iowa Pre-Flight.

October 21 No. 1 Notre Dame defeated Wisconsin 28–13. No. 2 Army beat the Coast Guard Academy, 76–0. No. 3 Randolph Field and Camp Polk played a Sunday game at Fort Worth, Texas, with Randolph's Ramblers winning 67–0. No. 4 Ohio State beat No. 6 Great Lakes, 26–6. No. 5 Iowa Pre-Flight defeated Fort Warren, 30–0. In Atlanta, No. 8 Georgia Tech defeated No. 9 Navy 17–15 and moved up to No. 5 behind Notre Dame, Army, Randolph Field, and Ohio State.

October 28 No. 1 Notre Dame won at No. 14 Illinois, 13–7. At a war bonds fundraiser at the Polo Grounds in New York, No. 2 Army beat Duke 27–7. No. 3 Randolph Field defeated Morris Field 19–0. No. 4 Ohio State beat Minnesota 34–14. No. 5 Georgia Tech reached 5–0–0 after a 13–7 win over the flight training school located on the U.Ga. campus, Georgia Pre-Flight. Army moved up to No. 1 in the next poll—the first time since the 1942 season that Notre Dame did not hold the top spot. The Fighting Irish fell to No. 2, followed by No. 3 Ohio State, No. 4 Randolph Field, and No. 5 Georgia Tech.

=== November ===
November 4 No. 1 Army rolled over Villanova, 83–0. In six games, the Cadets had outscored their opponents by an average of 60 to 3. In Baltimore, No. 2 Notre Dame lost to No. 6 Navy, 32–13. No. 3 Ohio State beat Indiana 21–7. No. 4 Randolph Field beat North Texas Agricultural (later called the University of Texas-Arlington) 68–0. No. 5 Georgia Tech lost at Duke, 19–13. The new top five were No. 1 Army, No. 2 Ohio State, No. 3 Navy, No. 4 Randolph Field, and No. 5 Notre Dame.

November 11 At Yankee Stadium in New York, No. 1 Army crushed No. 5 Notre Dame, 59–0. No. 2 Ohio State beat Pittsburgh 54–19. No. 3 Navy beat Cornell, 48–0. No. 4 Randolph Field defeated Maxwell Field, 25–0. No. 8 Michigan, which beat No. 10 Illinois 14–0, took Notre Dame's place at No. 5 behind No. 1 Army, No. 2 Randolph Field, No. 3 Navy, and No. 4 Ohio State.

November 18 In Philadelphia, No. 1 Army beat Pennsylvania, 62–7. In Georgetown, Texas, No. 2 Randolph Field beat Southwestern University, 54–0. No. 3 Navy defeated No. 14 Purdue in Baltimore, 32–0. In Cleveland, before a crowd of 83,627 fans, No. 4 Ohio State beat Illinois 26–12. No. 5 Michigan defeated Wisconsin, 14–0. In a Sunday game between service teams, No. 6 United States Naval Training Center Bainbridge, Maryland defeated Camp Lejeune, 33–6. The next top five was No. 1 Army, No. 2 Navy, No. 3 Ohio State, No. 4 Randolph Field, and No. 5 Bainbridge Naval.

November 25 No. 1 Army (8–0–0) and No. 2 Navy (6–2–0) were both idle as they prepared for the annual Army–Navy Game. No. 3 Ohio State beat No. 6 Michigan 18–14. The next day, No. 4 Randolph Field beat Amarillo Field, 33–0, and No. 5 Bainbridge Naval beat No. 14 Camp Peary, 21–13. The top five remained the same.

=== December ===
December 2 No. 1 Army and No. 2 Navy met in Baltimore. Army's offense was held to its lowest score of the season, but won 23–7 to cap a perfect season. Army had scored 59 points or more in seven of its nine games, with a 504 to 35 aggregate over its opponents. No. 3 Ohio State had finished its season and moved up to No. 2 after Navy's loss, while No. 4 Randolph Field and No. 5 Bainbridge Naval were idle. After the release of the final poll, Randolph Field participated in two more games for the sale of bonds. In Los Angeles, the "Ramblers" beat the Fourth Air Force team (March Field), 20–7, on December 10. Six days later, Randolph Field met the Second Air Force Superbombers at the Polo Grounds in New York for the “Treasury Bond Bowl”, and won 13–6 to complete their season at 11–0–0. Their final ranking was No. 3, ahead of No. 4 Navy and No. 5 Bainbridge Naval.

=== Bowl games ===
| Bowl game | Winning team | | Losing team | |
|---|---|---|---|---|
| Rose Bowl | No. 7 USC | 25 | No. 12 Tennessee | 0 |
| Sugar Bowl | No. 11 Duke | 29 | Alabama | 26 |
| Orange Bowl | Tulsa | 26 | No. 13 Georgia Tech | 12 |
| Cotton Bowl Classic | Oklahoma A&M | 34 | TCU | 0 |
| Sun Bowl | Southwestern (TX) | 35 | Pumas CU | 0 |

== Conference standings ==
=== Major conference standings ===
1944 Big Six Conference football standings
| | Conf. | | | | | Overall |
| Team | W | | L | | T | W | | L | | T |
|---|---|---|---|---|---|---|---|---|---|---|
| Oklahoma $ | 4 | – | 0 | – | 1 | 6 | – | 3 | – | 1 |
| Iowa State | 3 | – | 1 | – | 1 | 6 | – | 1 | – | 1 |
| Missouri | 2 | – | 1 | – | 2 | 3 | – | 5 | – | 2 |
| Nebraska | 2 | – | 3 | – | 0 | 2 | – | 6 | – | 0 |
| Kansas | 1 | – | 4 | – | 0 | 3 | – | 6 | – | 1 |
| Kansas State | 1 | – | 4 | – | 0 | 2 | – | 5 | – | 2 |
$ – Conference champion

1944 Big Ten Conference football standings
| | Conf. | | | | | Overall |
| Team | W | | L | | T | W | | L | | T |
|---|---|---|---|---|---|---|---|---|---|---|
| No. 2 Ohio State $ | 6 | – | 0 | – | 0 | 9 | – | 0 | – | 0 |
| No. 8 Michigan | 5 | – | 2 | – | 0 | 8 | – | 2 | – | 0 |
| Purdue | 4 | – | 2 | – | 0 | 5 | – | 5 | – | 0 |
| Minnesota | 3 | – | 2 | – | 1 | 5 | – | 3 | – | 1 |
| Indiana | 4 | – | 3 | – | 0 | 7 | – | 3 | – | 0 |
| No. 15 Illinois | 3 | – | 3 | – | 0 | 5 | – | 4 | – | 1 |
| Wisconsin | 2 | – | 4 | – | 0 | 3 | – | 6 | – | 0 |
| Northwestern | 0 | – | 5 | – | 1 | 1 | – | 7 | – | 1 |
| Iowa | 0 | – | 6 | – | 0 | 1 | – | 7 | – | 0 |
+ – Conference co-champions; Rankings from AP Poll

1944 Missouri Valley Conference football standings
| | Conf. | | | | | Overall |
| Team | W | | L | | T | W | | L | | T |
|---|---|---|---|---|---|---|---|---|---|---|
| Oklahoma A&M $ | 1 | – | 0 | – | 0 | 8 | – | 1 | – | 0 |
| Tulsa | 0 | – | 1 | – | 0 | 8 | – | 2 | – | 0 |
| Drake | 0 | – | 0 | – | 0 | 7 | – | 2 | – | 0 |
$ – Conference champion

1944 Mountain States Conference football standings
| | Conf. | | | | | Overall |
| Team | W | | L | | T | W | | L | | T |
|---|---|---|---|---|---|---|---|---|---|---|
| Colorado $ | 2 | – | 0 | – | 0 | 6 | – | 2 | – | 0 |
| Denver | 2 | – | 1 | – | 1 | 4 | – | 3 | – | 2 |
| Utah | 1 | – | 2 | – | 1 | 5 | – | 2 | – | 1 |
| Utah State | 0 | – | 2 | – | 0 | 3 | – | 3 | – | 0 |
$ – Conference champion

1944 Pacific Coast Conference football standings
| | Conf. | | | | | Overall |
| Team | W | | L | | T | W | | L | | T |
|---|---|---|---|---|---|---|---|---|---|---|
| No. 7 USC $ | 3 | – | 0 | – | 2 | 8 | – | 0 | – | 2 |
| Washington | 1 | – | 1 | – | 0 | 5 | – | 3 | – | 0 |
| UCLA | 1 | – | 2 | – | 1 | 4 | – | 5 | – | 1 |
| California | 1 | – | 3 | – | 1 | 3 | – | 6 | – | 1 |
$ – Conference champion; Rankings from AP Poll

1944 Southeastern Conference football standings
| | Conf. | | | | | Overall |
| Team | | W | | L | | | W | | L |
|---|---|---|---|---|---|---|---|---|---|---|
| No. T–13 Georgia Tech $ | 4 | – | 0 | – | 0 | 8 | – | 3 | – | 0 |
| No. 12 Tennessee | 5 | – | 0 | – | 1 | 7 | – | 1 | – | 1 |
| Georgia | 4 | – | 2 | – | 0 | 7 | – | 3 | – | 0 |
| Alabama | 3 | – | 1 | – | 2 | 5 | – | 2 | – | 2 |
| Mississippi State | 3 | – | 2 | – | 0 | 6 | – | 2 | – | 0 |
| LSU | 2 | – | 3 | – | 1 | 2 | – | 5 | – | 1 |
| Ole Miss | 2 | – | 3 | – | 0 | 2 | – | 6 | – | 0 |
| Tulane | 1 | – | 2 | – | 0 | 4 | – | 3 | – | 0 |
| Kentucky | 1 | – | 5 | – | 0 | 3 | – | 6 | – | 0 |
| Florida | 0 | – | 3 | – | 0 | 4 | – | 3 | – | 0 |
| Auburn | 0 | – | 4 | – | 0 | 4 | – | 4 | – | 0 |
| Vanderbilt | 0 | – | 0 | – | 0 | 3 | – | 0 | – | 1 |
$ – Conference champion; Rankings from AP Poll

1944 Southern Conference football standings
| | Conf. | | | | | Overall |
| Team | W | | L | | T | W | | L | | T |
|---|---|---|---|---|---|---|---|---|---|---|
| No. 11 Duke $ | 4 | – | 0 | – | 0 | 6 | – | 4 | – | 0 |
| Wake Forest | 6 | – | 1 | – | 0 | 8 | – | 1 | – | 0 |
| Clemson | 3 | – | 1 | – | 0 | 4 | – | 5 | – | 0 |
| NC State | 3 | – | 1 | – | 0 | 7 | – | 2 | – | 0 |
| William & Mary | 2 | – | 1 | – | 1 | 5 | – | 2 | – | 1 |
| Maryland | 1 | – | 1 | – | 0 | 1 | – | 7 | – | 1 |
| South Carolina | 1 | – | 3 | – | 0 | 3 | – | 4 | – | 2 |
| VMI | 1 | – | 5 | – | 0 | 1 | – | 8 | – | 0 |
| North Carolina | 0 | – | 3 | – | 1 | 1 | – | 7 | – | 1 |
| Richmond | 0 | – | 4 | – | 0 | 2 | – | 6 | – | 0 |
$ – Conference champion; Rankings from AP Poll

1944 Southwest Conference football standings
| | Conf. | | | | | Overall |
| Team | W | | L | | T | W | | L | | T |
|---|---|---|---|---|---|---|---|---|---|---|
| TCU $ | 3 | – | 1 | – | 1 | 7 | – | 3 | – | 1 |
| Texas | 3 | – | 2 | – | 0 | 5 | – | 4 | – | 0 |
| Arkansas | 2 | – | 2 | – | 1 | 5 | – | 5 | – | 1 |
| Texas A&M | 2 | – | 3 | – | 0 | 7 | – | 4 | – | 0 |
| SMU | 2 | – | 3 | – | 0 | 5 | – | 5 | – | 0 |
| Rice | 2 | – | 3 | – | 0 | 5 | – | 6 | – | 0 |
$ – Conference champion

=== Independents ===
1944 Eastern college football independents records
| | Conf. | | | Overall |
| Team | W | L | T | W | | L | | T |
|---|---|---|---|---|---|---|---|---|
| No. 1 Army | | – | | 9 | – | 0 | – | 0 |
| Yale | | – | | 7 | – | 0 | – | 1 |
| Harvard | | – | | 5 | – | 1 | – | 0 |
| Bucknell | | – | | 7 | – | 2 | – | 1 |
| Penn State | | – | | 6 | – | 3 | – | 0 |
| Penn | | – | | 5 | – | 3 | – | 0 |
| Boston College | | – | | 4 | – | 3 | – | 0 |
| Cornell | | – | | 5 | – | 4 | – | 0 |
| Villanova | | – | | 4 | – | 4 | – | 0 |
| Drexel | | – | | 2 | – | 2 | – | 0 |
| Pittsburgh | | – | | 4 | – | 5 | – | 0 |
| Brown | | – | | 3 | – | 4 | – | 1 |
| Temple | | – | | 2 | – | 4 | – | 2 |
| Syracuse | | – | | 2 | – | 4 | – | 1 |
| Princeton | | – | | 1 | – | 2 | – | 0 |
| Dartmouth | | – | | 2 | – | 5 | – | 1 |
| Colgate | | – | | 2 | – | 5 | – | 0 |
| NYU | | – | | 2 | – | 5 | – | 0 |
| Columbia | | – | | 2 | – | 6 | – | 0 |
| Tufts | | – | | 1 | – | 4 | – | 1 |
| Franklin & Marshall | | – | | 1 | – | 8 | – | 0 |
| CCNY | | – | | 0 | – | 7 | – | 0 |
Rankings from AP Poll

1944 Midwestern college football independents records
| | Conf. | | | Overall |
| Team | W | L | T | W | | L | | T |
|---|---|---|---|---|---|---|---|---|
| Miami (OH) | | – | | 8 | – | 1 | – | 0 |
| Michigan State | | – | | 6 | – | 1 | – | 0 |
| No. 9 Notre Dame | | – | | 8 | – | 2 | – | 0 |
| Central Michigan | | – | | 5 | – | 2 | – | 0 |
| Wichita | | – | | 5 | – | 2 | – | 1 |
| Bowling Green | | – | | 5 | – | 3 | – | 0 |
| Western Michigan | | – | | 4 | – | 3 | – | 0 |
| Wayne | | – | | 1 | – | 1 | – | 0 |
| Ohio Wesleyan | | – | | 1 | – | 8 | – | 1 |
| Marquette | | – | | 1 | – | 7 | – | 0 |
Rankings from AP Poll

1944 Southern college football independents records
| | Conf. | | | Overall |
| Team | W | L | T | W | | L | | T |
|---|---|---|---|---|---|---|---|---|
| Virginia | | – | | 6 | – | 1 | – | 2 |
| No. 4 Navy | | – | | 6 | – | 3 | – | 0 |
| West Virginia | | – | | 5 | – | 3 | – | 1 |
| Millsaps | | – | | 3 | – | 6 | – | 0 |
| Delaware State | | – | | 2 | – | 3 | – | 0 |
| Tennessee Tech | | – | | 1 | – | 2 | – | 0 |
| North Texas Aggies | | – | | 2 | – | 6 | – | 0 |
| Miami (FL) | | – | | 1 | – | 7 | – | 1 |
| Sewanee | | – | | 0 | – | 3 | – | 1 |
| Howard (AL) | | – | | 0 | – | 5 | – | 0 |
Rankings from AP Poll

1944 Western college football independents records
| | Conf. | | | Overall |
| Team | W | L | T | W | | L | | T |
|---|---|---|---|---|---|---|---|---|
| Nevada | | – | | 4 | – | 4 | – | 0 |
| Idaho Southern Branch | | – | | 4 | – | 5 | – | 0 |
| Pacific (CA) | | – | | 3 | – | 8 | – | 0 |
| Saint Mary's | | – | | 0 | – | 5 | – | 0 |
| Fresno State | | – | | 0 | – | 6 | – | 0 |

1944 military service football records
| | Conf. | | | Overall |
| Team | W | L | T | W | | L | | T |
|---|---|---|---|---|---|---|---|---|
| No. 3 Randolph Field | | – | | 11 | – | 0 | – | 0 |
| No. 5 Bainbridge | | – | | 10 | – | 0 | – | 0 |
| No. 18 Fort Pierce | | – | | 9 | – | 0 | – | 0 |
| No. T–13 Norman NAS | | – | | 6 | – | 0 | – | 0 |
| No. 6 Iowa Pre-Flight | | – | | 10 | – | 1 | – | 0 |
| No. 16 El Toro Marines | | – | | 8 | – | 1 | – | 0 |
| Hondo AAF | | – | | 7 | – | 1 | – | 0 |
| Bunker Hill NAS | | – | | 6 | – | 1 | – | 0 |
| Lincoln AAF | | – | | 6 | – | 1 | – | 0 |
| Blackland AAF | | – | | 7 | – | 1 | – | 1 |
| Keesler Field | | – | | 8 | – | 1 | – | 2 |
| No. 17 Great Lakes Navy | | – | | 9 | – | 2 | – | 1 |
| No. 10 March Field | | – | | 7 | – | 2 | – | 2 |
| Third Air Force | | – | | 8 | – | 3 | – | 0 |
| North Carolina Pre-Flight | | – | | 6 | – | 2 | – | 1 |
| Atlantic City NAS | | – | | 5 | – | 2 | – | 0 |
| Camp Peary | | – | | 5 | – | 2 | – | 0 |
| Tonopah AAF | | – | | 5 | – | 2 | – | 0 |
| Daniel Field | | – | | 7 | – | 3 | – | 0 |
| No. 20 Second Air Force | | – | | 10 | – | 4 | – | 1 |
| San Francisco Coast Guard | | – | | 4 | – | 2 | – | 1 |
| Ellington Field | | – | | 6 | – | 3 | – | 2 |
| Amarillo AAF | | – | | 5 | – | 3 | – | 0 |
| Alameda Coast Guard | | – | | 4 | – | 2 | – | 2 |
| Coronado Amphibious | | – | | 2 | – | 1 | – | 1 |
| Olathe NAS | | – | | 4 | – | 2 | – | 2 |
| Selman Field | | – | | 4 | – | 2 | – | 2 |
| Galveston AAF | | – | | 5 | – | 3 | – | 2 |
| Fleet City | | – | | 6 | – | 4 | – | 1 |
| Jacksonville NAS | | – | | 4 | – | 3 | – | 0 |
| San Diego NTS | | – | | 4 | – | 3 | – | 1 |
| Camp Beale | | – | | 5 | – | 4 | – | 0 |
| Lubbock AAF | | – | | 5 | – | 4 | – | 0 |
| Fort Warren | | – | | 5 | – | 4 | – | 1 |
| Fort Monroe | | – | | 5 | – | 5 | – | 0 |
| Klamath Falls Marines | | – | | 2 | – | 2 | – | 1 |
| Maxwell Field | | – | | 5 | – | 5 | – | 0 |
| Minter Field | | – | | 3 | – | 3 | – | 0 |
| No. 19 Saint Mary's Pre-Flight | | – | | 4 | – | 4 | – | 0 |
| Fourth Infantry | | – | | 3 | – | 4 | – | 2 |
| Georgia Pre-Flight | | – | | 4 | – | 5 | – | 0 |
| Third Infantry | | – | | 4 | – | 5 | – | 0 |
| Melville PT Boats | | – | | 3 | – | 0 | – | 0 |
| Bergstrom Field | | – | | 3 | – | 4 | – | 0 |
| Ottumwa NAS | | – | | 3 | – | 4 | – | 0 |
| Camp Lee | | – | | 3 | – | 5 | – | 0 |
| Cherry Point Marines | | – | | 3 | – | 6 | – | 0 |
| Chatham Field | | – | | 2 | – | 8 | – | 1 |
| Sampton NTS | | – | | 2 | – | 7 | – | 0 |
| Miami NTC | | – | | 2 | – | 8 | – | 0 |
| Bryan AAF | | – | | 1 | – | 7 | – | 0 |
| Fairfield-Suisun AAB | | – | | 1 | – | 7 | – | 0 |
| Richmond AAB | | – | | 0 | – | 10 | – | 1 |
| Camp Ellis | | – | | 0 | – | 5 | – | 0 |
| South Plains AAF | | – | | 0 | – | 8 | – | 0 |
Rankings from AP Poll

=== Minor conferences ===
| Conference | Champion(s) | Record |
|---|---|---|
| California Collegiate Athletic Association | No champion | — |
| Central Intercollegiate Athletics Association | Morgan State College | 4–0 |
| Central Intercollegiate Athletic Conference | No champion | — |
| Far Western Conference | No champion | — |
| Indiana Intercollegiate Conference | Wabash College | 4–0–1 |
| Iowa Intercollegiate Athletic Conference | No champion | — |
| Kansas Collegiate Athletic Conference | No champion | — |
| Lone Star Conference | No champion | — |
| Midwest Collegiate Athletic Conference | No champion | — |
| Minnesota Intercollegiate Athletic Conference | No champion | — |
| Missouri Intercollegiate Athletic Association | No champion | — |
| Nebraska College Athletic Conference | No champion | — |
| New Mexico Intercollegiate Conference | No champion | — |
| North Central Intercollegiate Athletic Conference | No champion | — |
| North Dakota College Athletic Conference | No champion | — |
| Ohio Athletic Conference | No champion | — |
| Oklahoma Collegiate Athletic Conference | No champion | — |
| Pacific Northwest Conference | No champion | — |
| Pennsylvania State Athletic Conference | No champion | — |
| Rocky Mountain Athletic Conference | No champion | — |
| South Dakota Intercollegiate Conference | No champion | — |
| Southern California Intercollegiate Athletic Conference | No champion | — |
| Southern Intercollegiate Athletic Conference | Florida A&M College | 5–0 |
| Southwestern Athletic Conference | Langston; Texas College; Wiley (TX) | 5–1 |
| State Teacher's College Conference of Minnesota | No champion | — |
| Texas Collegiate Athletic Conference | No champion | — |
| Washington Intercollegiate Conference | No champion | — |
| Wisconsin State Teachers College Conference | No champion | — |

=== Minor conference standings ===
1944 Border Conference football standings
| | Conf. | | | | | Overall |
| Team | W | | L | | T | W | | L | | T |
|---|---|---|---|---|---|---|---|---|---|---|
| Texas Tech | 2 | – | 0 | – | 0 | 4 | – | 7 | – | 0 |
| West Texas State | 1 | – | 1 | – | 0 | 4 | – | 3 | – | 0 |
| New Mexico | 0 | – | 2 | – | 0 | 1 | – | 7 | – | 0 |
| Arizona State–Flagstaff | 0 | – | 0 | – | 0 | 2 | – | 2 | – | 0 |
$ – Conference champion

1944 Colored Intercollegiate Athletic Association football standings
| | Conf. | | | | | Overall |
| Team | W | | L | | T | W | | L | | T |
|---|---|---|---|---|---|---|---|---|---|---|
| Morgan State $ | 4 | – | 0 | – | 0 | 6 | – | 1 | – | 0 |
| Virginia State | 4 | – | 1 | – | 1 | 5 | – | 2 | – | 1 |
| Johnson C. Smith | 3 | – | 0 | – | 2 | 5 | – | 0 | – | 3 |
| North Carolina A&T | 1 | – | 3 | – | 1 | 4 | – | 4 | – | 1 |
| Hampton | 1 | – | 4 | – | 1 | 1 | – | 5 | – | 1 |
| Howard | 1 | – | 2 | – | 0 | 1 | – | 4 | – | 0 |
| Lincoln (PA) | 1 | – | 3 | – | 0 | 2 | – | 4 | – | 1 |
| West Virginia State | 0 | – | 2 | – | 1 | 1 | – | 4 | – | 1 |
$ – Conference champion; Conference standings were based on the Dickinson System.

1944 Illinois Intercollegiate Athletic Conference football standings
| | Conf. | | | | | Overall |
| Team | W | | L | | T | W | | L | | T |
|---|---|---|---|---|---|---|---|---|---|---|
| Northern Illinois State $ | 3 | – | 0 | – | 0 | 7 | – | 0 | – | 0 |
| Illinois State Normal | 1 | – | 0 | – | 0 | 3 | – | 4 | – | 1 |
| Southern Illinois | 2 | – | 1 | – | 0 | 3 | – | 3 | – | 0 |
| Eastern Illinois | 1 | – | 2 | – | 0 | 1 | – | 3 | – | 0 |
| Western Illinois | 0 | – | 4 | – | 0 | 0 | – | 8 | – | 0 |
$ – Conference champion

1944 Middle Three Conference football standings
| | Conf. | | | | | Overall |
| Team | W | | L | | T | W | | L | | T |
|---|---|---|---|---|---|---|---|---|---|---|
| Lafayette $ | 4 | – | 0 | – | 0 | 6 | – | 1 | – | 0 |
| Rutgers | 2 | – | 2 | – | 0 | 3 | – | 2 | – | 0 |
| Lehigh | 0 | – | 4 | – | 0 | 0 | – | 6 | – | 0 |
$ – Conference champion

1944 New England Conference football standings
| | Conf. | | | | | Overall |
| Team | W | | L | | T | W | | L | | T |
|---|---|---|---|---|---|---|---|---|---|---|
| New Hampshire + | 1 | – | 1 | – | 0 | 1 | – | 3 | – | 0 |
| Maine + | 1 | – | 1 | – | 0 | 2 | – | 2 | – | 0 |
| Connecticut | 0 | – | 0 | – | 0 | 7 | – | 1 | – | 0 |
+ – Conference co-champions

1944 Southern Intercollegiate Athletic Conference football standings
| | Conf. | | | | | Overall |
| Team | W | | L | | T | W | | L | | T |
|---|---|---|---|---|---|---|---|---|---|---|
| Florida A&M $ | 5 | – | 0 | – | 0 | 7 | – | 3 | – | 0 |
| Tuskegee | 5 | – | 1 | – | 0 | 6 | – | 4 | – | 0 |
| Clark (GA) | 3 | – | 2 | – | 0 | 5 | – | 3 | – | 0 |
| Morehouse | 3 | – | 3 | – | 0 | 3 | – | 4 | – | 0 |
| Morris Brown | 2 | – | 4 | – | 0 | 3 | – | 4 | – | 0 |
| Alabama State | 1 | – | 5 | – | 0 | 1 | – | 7 | – | 0 |
| Knoxville | 0 | – | 1 | – | 0 | 4 | – | 3 | – | 0 |
| Alabama A&M | 0 | – | 1 | – | 0 | 0 | – | 1 | – | 0 |
| Xavier (LA) | 0 | – | 2 | – | 0 | 3 | – | 5 | – | 0 |
$ – Conference champion

1944 Southwestern Athletic Conference football standings
| | Conf. | | | | | Overall |
| Team | W | | L | | T | W | | L | | T |
|---|---|---|---|---|---|---|---|---|---|---|
| Texas College + | 5 | – | 1 | – | 0 | 8 | – | 1 | – | 0 |
| Wiley + | 5 | – | 1 | – | 0 | 8 | – | 1 | – | 0 |
| Langston + | 5 | – | 1 | – | 0 | 6 | – | 2 | – | 1 |
| Southern | 2 | – | 4 | – | 0 | 4 | – | 4 | – | 0 |
| Samuel Huston | 2 | – | 4 | – | 0 | 3 | – | 5 | – | 0 |
| Prairie View | 2 | – | 4 | – | 0 | 3 | – | 6 | – | 0 |
| Arkansas AM&N | 0 | – | 6 | – | 0 | 1 | – | 7 | – | 0 |
+ – Conference co-champions

== Awards and honors ==
=== All-Americans ===
The consensus All-America team included:

| Position | Name | Height | Weight (lbs.) | Class | Hometown | Team |
|---|---|---|---|---|---|---|
| QB | Les Horvath | 5'10" | 173 | Sr. | Parma, Ohio | Ohio State |
| HB | Glenn Davis | 5'9" | 175 | So. | Claremont, California | Army |
| HB | Bob Jenkins | 6'1" | 195 | Jr. | Talladega, Alabama | Navy |
| FB | Doc Blanchard | 6'0" | 205 | Jr. | Bishopville, South Carolina | Army |
| E | Phil Tinsley | 6'1" | 188 | Sr. | Bessemer, Alabama | Georgia Tech |
| E | Paul Walker | 6'3" | 203 | Jr. | Springfield, Missouri | Yale |
| T | Don Whitmire | 5'11" | 215 | Sr. | Giles Co., Tennessee | Alabama |
| G | Bill Hackett | 5'9" | 191 | Jr. | London, Ohio | Ohio State |
| C | John Tavener | 6'0" | 220 | Sr. | Newark, Ohio | Indiana |
| G | Ben Chase | 6'1" | 195 | | San Diego, California | Navy |
| T | John Ferraro | 6'4" | 245 | So. | Los Angeles, California | USC |
| E | Jack Dugger | 6'3" | 210 | Sr. | Canton, Ohio | Ohio State |

=== Heisman Trophy voting ===
The Heisman Trophy is given to the year's most outstanding player

| Player | School | Position | Total |
|---|---|---|---|
| Les Horvath | Ohio State | HB/QB | 412 |
| Glenn Davis | Army | HB | 287 |
| Doc Blanchard | Army | FB | 237 |
| Don Whitmire | Navy | OT | 115 |
| Buddy Young | Illinois | HB | 105 |
| Bob Kelly | Notre Dame | HB | 76 |
| Bob Jenkins | Navy | HB | 60 |
| Doug Kenna | Army | QB | 56 |
| Bob Fenimore | Oklahoma A&M | HB | 54 |
| Shorty McWilliams | Mississippi State | HB | 37 |

== Statistical leaders ==
=== Team leaders ===
==== Total offense ====
| Rank | Team | Games played | Total plays | Yards gained | Yards per game |
|---|---|---|---|---|---|
| 1 | Tulsa | 9 | 576 | 3912 | 434.7 |
| 2 | Army | 9 | 501 | 3877 | 430.8 |
| 3 | Randolph Field | 10 | 584 | 3770 | 377.0 |
| 4 | Auburn | 6* | 399 | 2191 | 365.2 |
| 5 | Ohio State | 9 | 635 | 3264 | 362.7 |
| 6 | Illinois | 10 | 521 | 3559 | 355.9 |
| 7 | Notre Dame | 10 | 690 | 3552 | 355.2 |
| 8 | Georgia | 9* | 680 | 3193 | 354.8 |
| 9 | Navy | 9 | 620 | 3159 | 351.0 |
| 10 | Tulane | 7 | 463 | 2381 | 340.1 |
| 11 | Indiana | 10 | 626 | 3381 | 338.1 |
| 12 | Great Lakes Navy | 12 | 733 | 3936 | 328.0 |
| 13 | Minnesota | 9 | 511 | 2928 | 325.3 |
| 14 | Oklahoma A&M | 8 | 435 | 2576 | 322.0 |
| 15 | Texas A&M | 11 | 656 | 3510 | 319.1 |
| 16 | Virginia | 9 | 558 | 2870 | 318.8 |

(*) One game not reported (**) Two or more games not reported

==== Total defense ====
| Rank | Team | Games played | Total plays | Yards gained | Yards per game |
|---|---|---|---|---|---|
| 1 | Virginia | 9 | 394 | 872 | 96.8 |
| 2 | Randolph Field | 10 | 516 | 1108 | 110.8 |
| 3 | Michigan State | 6 | 286 | 692 | 115.3 |
| 4 | Army | 9 | 499 | 1162 | 129.1 |
| 5 | Wake Forest | 7** | 303 | 907 | 129.6 |
| 6 | Navy | 9 | 447 | 1227 | 136.3 |
| 7 | Yale | 5** | 260 | 707 | 141.4 |
| 8 | Alabama | 7* | 365 | 1008 | 144.0 |
| 9 | USC | 9 | 434 | 1385 | 153.9 |
| 10 | Texas A&M | 11 | 607 | 1754 | 159.5 |
| 11 | Temple | 7* | 330 | 1245 | 177.9 |
| 12 | Tulsa | 9 | 436 | 1628 | 180.1 |
| 13 | TCU | 10 | 589 | 1874 | 187.4 |
| 14 | Tennessee | 8* | 395 | 1526 | 190.8 |
| 15 | South Carolina | 9 | 481 | 1758 | 195.3 |
| 16 | Penn State | 9 | 480 | 1770 | 196.7 |

(*) One game not reported (**) Two or more games not reported

==== Rushing offense ====
| Rank | Team | Games | Rushes | Yards gained | Yards per game |
|---|---|---|---|---|---|
| 1 | Army | 9 | 381 | 2687 | 298.6 |
| 2 | Tulane | 7 | 385 | 2074 | 296.3 |
| 3 | Illinois | 10 | 449 | 2940 | 294.0 |
| 4 | Auburn | 6* | 319 | 1752 | 292.0 |
| 5 | Ohio State | 9 | 542 | 2506 | 278.4 |
| 6 | Virginia | 9 | 481 | 2468 | 274.2 |
| 7 | Minnesota | 9 | 452 | 2381 | 264.6 |
| 8 | Randolph Field | 10 | 424 | 2574 | 257.4 |
| 9 | Michigan | 10 | 528 | 2541 | 254.1 |
| 10 | Navy | 9 | 470 | 2166 | 240.7 |
| 11 | Washington | 7 | 289 | 1680 | 240.0 |
| 12 | Iowa State | 6** | 258 | 1436 | 239.3 |
| 13 | Notre Dame | 10 | 509 | 2323 | 232.3 |
| 14 | Great Lakes Navy | 12 | 553 | 2770 | 230.8 |
| 15 | Tulsa | 9 | 398 | 2055 | 228.3 |
| 16 | Purdue | 10 | 534 | 2277 | 227.7 |
| 17 | USC | 9 | 465 | 2024 | 224.9 |

(*) One game not reported (**) Two or more games not reported

==== Rushing defense ====
| Rank | Team | Games | Rushes | Yards gained | Yards per game |
|---|---|---|---|---|---|
| 1 | Randolph Field | 10 | 289 | 296 | 29.6 |
| 2 | Navy | 9 | 282 | 484 | 53.8 |
| 3 | Virginia | 9 | 276 | 499 | 55.4 |
| 4 | Army | 9 | 298 | 518 | 57.6 |
| 5 | Texas A&M | 11 | 390 | 845 | 76.7 |
| 6 | Tulsa | 9 | 249 | 737 | 81.9 |
| 7 | Wake Forest | 7** | 207 | 728 | 81.9 |
| 8 | Yale | 5** | 181 | 414 | 82.8 |
| 9 | USC | 9 | 277 | 759 | 84.3 |
| 10 | Michigan State | 6 | 220 | 532 | 88.7 |

(*) One game not reported (**) Two or more games not reported

==== Passing offense ====
| Rank | Team | Games | Att. | Compl. | Int. | Pct. Compl. | Yards | Yds/Game |
|---|---|---|---|---|---|---|---|---|
| 1 | Tulsa | 9 | 178 | 102 | 11 | .573 | 1857 | 206.3 |
| 2 | Georgia Tech | 6** | 125 | 53 | 10 | .424 | 852 | 142.0 |
| 3 | Georgia | 9* | 153 | 73 | 13 | .477 | 1244 | 138.2 |
| 4 | Army | 9 | 120 | 64 | 8 | .533 | 1190 | 132.2 |
| 5 | Oklahoma A&M | 8 | 110 | 63 | 8 | .573 | 1008 | 126.0 |
| 6 | Pittsburgh | 9 | 212 | 97 | 28 | .458 | 1117 | 124.1 |
| 7 | Notre Dame | 10 | 181 | 81 | 16 | .448 | 1229 | 122.9 |
| 8 | Texas | 9 | 166 | 88 | 12 | .530 | 1092 | 121.3 |
| 9 | Randolph Field | 10 | 160 | 66 | 12 | .413 | 1196 | 119.6 |
| 10 | Texas A&M | 11 | 177 | 88 | 18 | .497 | 1300 | 118.2 |

(*) One game not reported (**) Two or more games not reported

==== Scoring ====
1. Army - 56.0 points per game
2. Randolph Field - 42.3 points per game
3. Tulsa - 38.0 points per game
4. Washington - 36.6 points per game
5. Second Air Force - 34.2 points per game
6. Ohio State - 31.9 points per game
7. Alabama - 30.2 points per game
9. Great Lakes - 29.0 points per game
10. Iowa Pre-Flight - 28.5 points per game

=== Individual leaders ===
==== Total offense ====
| Rank | Player | Team | Games | Plays | Rush Yds | Pass Yds | Total Yds | Avg Gain per Play |
|---|---|---|---|---|---|---|---|---|
| 1 | Bob Fenimore | Oklahoma A&M | 8 | 241 | 897 | 861 | 1758 | |
| 2 | Wayne Williams | Minnesota | 9 | 176 | 911 | 378 | 1289 | |
| 3 | Les Horvath | Ohio State | 9 | 194 | 905 | 345 | 1250 | |
| 4 | Frank Dancewicz | Notre Dame | 10 | 231 | 841 | 989 | 1220 | |
| 5 | Al Dekdebrun | Cornell | 9 | 258 | 398 | 648 | 1046 | |

==== Rushing ====
| Rank | Player | Team | Games | Rushes | Net Yds | Avg Gain per Play |
|---|---|---|---|---|---|---|
| 1 | Wayne Williams | Minnesota | 9 | 136 | 911 | 6.70 |
| 2 | Les Horvath | Ohio State | 9 | 163 | 905 | 5.55 |
| 3 | Bob Fenimore | Oklahoma A&M | 8 | 162 | 897 | 5.54 |
| 4 | Kuykendall | Auburn | 7* | 127 | 841 | 6.62 |
| 5 | Young | Illinois | 10 | 94 | 840 | 8.94 |
| 6 | Dimancheff | Purdue | 10 | 175 | 830 | 4.74 |
| 7 | Patterson | Illinois | 10 | 131 | 790 | 5.27 |
| 8 | Duda | Virginia | 9 | 125 | 716 | 5.72 |
| 9 | Jones | Tulane | 7 | 140 | 700 | 5.00 |
| 10 | Kelly | Notre Dame | 10 | 136 | 681 | 5.01 |
| 11 | Glenn Davis | Army | 9 | 58 | 667 | 11.50 |

==== Passing ====
| Rank | Player | Team | Games | Att. | Compl. | Int. | Pct. Compl. | Yds. |
|---|---|---|---|---|---|---|---|---|
| 1 | Paul Rickards | Pittsburgh | 9 | 178 | 84 | 20 | .472 | 997 |
| 2 | Frank Dancewicz | Notre Dame | 10 | 153 | 68 | 12 | .444 | 989 |
| 3 | Cashion | Texas A&M | 11 | 113 | 59 | 12 | .522 | 852 |
| 4 | Bob Waterfield | UCLA | 10 | 136 | 55 | 19 | .404 | 901 |
| 5 | Al Dekdebrun | Cornell | 9 | 121 | 53 | 13 | .438 | 648 |

==== Receiving ====
| Rank | Player | Team | Games | Receptions | Receiving Yards |
|---|---|---|---|---|---|
| 1 | Reid Moseley | Georgia | 9 | 32 | 506 |
| 2 | Armstrong | Oklahoma A&M | 8 | 26 | 325 |
| 3 | White | Tulsa | 9 | 25 | 450 |
| 4 | Howell | Texas A&M | 11 | 24 | 394 |
| 5 | Folsom | SMU | 10 | 21 | 246 |

==== Scoring ====
| Rank | Player | Team | Touchdowns | PAT | FG | Points |
|---|---|---|---|---|---|---|
| 1 | Glenn Davis | Army | 20 | 0 | 0 | 120 |
| 2 | Charlie Justice | Bainbridge | 14 | 0 | 0 | 84 |
| 3 | Kelley | Notre Dame | 13 | 6 | 0 | 84 |
| 4 | McWilliams | Mississippi State | 14 | 0 | 0 | 84 |
| 5 | Perry | Compton College | 14 | 0 | 0 | 84 |
