= 1944 Harvard Crimson football team =

American college football season

1944 Harvard Crimson football
- Conference: Independent
- Record: 5–1
- Head coach: Henry Lamar (2nd season)
- Captain: Wally Trumbull Jr.
- Home stadium: Harvard Stadium

1944 Eastern college football independents records
	Conf.			Overall
Team	W	L	T	W		L		T
No. 1 Army		–		9	–	0	–	0
Yale		–		7	–	0	–	1
Harvard		–		5	–	1	–	0
Bucknell		–		7	–	2	–	1
Penn State		–		6	–	3	–	0
Penn		–		5	–	3	–	0
Boston College		–		4	–	3	–	0
Cornell		–		5	–	4	–	0
Villanova		–		4	–	4	–	0
Drexel		–		2	–	2	–	0
Pittsburgh		–		4	–	5	–	0
Brown		–		3	–	4	–	1
Temple		–		2	–	4	–	2
Syracuse		–		2	–	4	–	1
Princeton		–		1	–	2	–	0
Dartmouth		–		2	–	5	–	1
Colgate		–		2	–	5	–	0
NYU		–		2	–	5	–	0
Columbia		–		2	–	6	–	0
Tufts		–		1	–	4	–	1
Franklin & Marshall		–		1	–	8	–	0
CCNY		–		0	–	7	–	0
Rankings from AP Poll

The 1944 Harvard Crimson football team was an American football team that represented Harvard University during the 1944 college football season. In its second and final season under head coach Henry Lamar, the team compiled a 5–1 record and outscored its opponents 100 to 37. Wally Trumbull Jr. was the team captain.

For 1944, as in 1943, rather than scheduling its usual mix of Ivy League opponents and national college football powerhouses, Harvard played a shorter schedule of smaller New England colleges and military teams. Its football record book describes these two World War II-era seasons as "informal".

Harvard played its home games at Harvard Stadium in the Allston neighborhood of Boston, Massachusetts.

== Schedule ==
Date	Opponent	Site	Result	Attendance	Source
September 16	Tufts	Harvard Stadium; Boston, MA	W 19–12	12,000	
September 23	Bates	Harvard Stadium; Boston, MA	W 43–6	8,000	
September 30	Worcester Tech	Harvard Stadium; Boston, MA	W 13–0	8,500	
October 7	Boston College	Harvard Stadium; Boston, MA	W 13–0	43,000	
November 11	Melville PT Boat Training Center	Harvard Stadium; Boston, MA	L 0–13	7,500	
November 18	at Tufts	Ellis Oval; Medford, MA	W 12–6	5,000	
