= 1944 Penn State Nittany Lions football team =

American college football season

1944 Penn State Nittany Lions football
- Conference: Independent
- Record: 6–3
- Head coach: Bob Higgins (15th season)
- Captain: John R. Chuckran
- Home stadium: New Beaver Field

1944 Eastern college football independents records
	Conf.			Overall
Team	W	L	T	W		L		T
No. 1 Army		–		9	–	0	–	0
Yale		–		7	–	0	–	1
Harvard		–		5	–	1	–	0
Bucknell		–		7	–	2	–	1
Penn State		–		6	–	3	–	0
Penn		–		5	–	3	–	0
Boston College		–		4	–	3	–	0
Cornell		–		5	–	4	–	0
Villanova		–		4	–	4	–	0
Drexel		–		2	–	2	–	0
Pittsburgh		–		4	–	5	–	0
Brown		–		3	–	4	–	1
Temple		–		2	–	4	–	2
Syracuse		–		2	–	4	–	1
Princeton		–		1	–	2	–	0
Dartmouth		–		2	–	5	–	1
Colgate		–		2	–	5	–	0
NYU		–		2	–	5	–	0
Columbia		–		2	–	6	–	0
Tufts		–		1	–	4	–	1
Franklin & Marshall		–		1	–	8	–	0
CCNY		–		0	–	7	–	0
Rankings from AP Poll

The 1944 Penn State Nittany Lions football team represented Pennsylvania State University as an independent during the 1944 college football season. The team was coached by Bob Higgins and played its home games at New Beaver Field in State College, Pennsylvania.

== Schedule ==
Date	Opponent	Site	Result	Attendance	Source
September 30	Muhlenberg	New Beaver Field; State College, PA	W 58–13	2,799	
October 7	at Navy	Thompson Stadium; Annapolis, MD	L 14–55		
October 14	Bucknell^{†}	New Beaver Field; State College, PA	W 20–6	4,753	
October 21	at Colgate	Colgate Athletic Field; Hamilton, NY	W 6–0	3,000	
October 28	West Virginia	New Beaver Field; State College, PA (rivalry)	L 27–28	5,534	
November 4	at Syracuse	Archbold Stadium; Syracuse, NY (rivalry)	W 41–0		
November 11	at Temple	Temple Stadium; Philadelphia, PA	W 7–6	12,000	
November 18	Maryland	New Beaver Field; State College, PA (rivalry)	W 34–19		
November 25	at Pittsburgh	Pitt Stadium; Pittsburgh, PA (rivalry)	L 0–14	8,840	
^{†}Homecoming
