= 1944 Colgate Red Raiders football team =

American college football season

1944 Colgate Red Raiders football
- Conference: Independent
- Record: 2–5
- Head coach: Andrew Kerr (16th season)
- Captains: Edward Stacco; Joseph Dilts
- Home stadium: Colgate Athletic Field

1944 Eastern college football independents records
	Conf.			Overall
Team	W	L	T	W		L		T
No. 1 Army		–		9	–	0	–	0
Yale		–		7	–	0	–	1
Harvard		–		5	–	1	–	0
Bucknell		–		7	–	2	–	1
Penn State		–		6	–	3	–	0
Penn		–		5	–	3	–	0
Boston College		–		4	–	3	–	0
Cornell		–		5	–	4	–	0
Villanova		–		4	–	4	–	0
Drexel		–		2	–	2	–	0
Pittsburgh		–		4	–	5	–	0
Brown		–		3	–	4	–	1
Temple		–		2	–	4	–	2
Syracuse		–		2	–	4	–	1
Princeton		–		1	–	2	–	0
Dartmouth		–		2	–	5	–	1
Colgate		–		2	–	5	–	0
NYU		–		2	–	5	–	0
Columbia		–		2	–	6	–	0
Tufts		–		1	–	4	–	1
Franklin & Marshall		–		1	–	8	–	0
CCNY		–		0	–	7	–	0
Rankings from AP Poll

The 1944 Colgate Red Raiders football team was an American football team that represented Colgate University as an independent during the 1944 college football season. In its 16th season under head coach Andrew Kerr, the team compiled a 2–5 record and was outscored by a total of 127 to 79. Edward Stacco and Joseph Dilts were the team captains. The team played its home games at Colgate Athletic Field in Hamilton, New York.

== Schedule ==
Date	Opponent	Site	Result	Attendance	Source
September 30	at Rochester	River Campus Stadium; Rochester, NY	L 13–20	8,000	
October 14	at Cornell	Schoellkopf Field; Ithaca, NY (rivalry)	W 14–7	7,000	
October 21	Penn State	Colgate Athletic Field; Hamilton, NY	L 0–6	3,000	
October 28	at Columbia	Baker Field; New York, NY	W 6–0	15,000	
November 11	at Holy Cross	Fitton Field; Worcester, MA	L 13–19	10,000	
November 18	at Syracuse	Archbold Stadium; Syracuse, NY (rivalry)	L 13–43	15,000	
November 25	at Brown	Brown Stadium; Providence, RI	L 20–32	12,000	
