= 1944 Columbia Lions football team =

American college football season

1944 Columbia Lions football
- Conference: Independent
- Record: 2–6
- Head coach: Lou Little (15th season)
- Captain: George Gilbert
- Home stadium: Baker Field

1944 Eastern college football independents records
	Conf.			Overall
Team	W	L	T	W		L		T
No. 1 Army		–		9	–	0	–	0
Yale		–		7	–	0	–	1
Harvard		–		5	–	1	–	0
Bucknell		–		7	–	2	–	1
Penn State		–		6	–	3	–	0
Penn		–		5	–	3	–	0
Boston College		–		4	–	3	–	0
Cornell		–		5	–	4	–	0
Villanova		–		4	–	4	–	0
Drexel		–		2	–	2	–	0
Pittsburgh		–		4	–	5	–	0
Brown		–		3	–	4	–	1
Temple		–		2	–	4	–	2
Syracuse		–		2	–	4	–	1
Princeton		–		1	–	2	–	0
Dartmouth		–		2	–	5	–	1
Colgate		–		2	–	5	–	0
NYU		–		2	–	5	–	0
Columbia		–		2	–	6	–	0
Tufts		–		1	–	4	–	1
Franklin & Marshall		–		1	–	8	–	0
CCNY		–		0	–	7	–	0
Rankings from AP Poll

The 1944 Columbia Lions football team was an American football team that represented Columbia University as an independent during the 1944 college football season.

In their 15th season under head coach Lou Little, the Lions compiled a 2–6 record, and were outscored 125 to 71 by opponents. George Gilbert was the team captain.

Columbia played its home games at Baker Field in Upper Manhattan, in New York City.

== Schedule ==
Date	Opponent	Site	Result	Attendance	Source
September 30	Union (NY)	Baker Field; New York, NY	W 21–0	8,000	
October 7	Syracuse	Baker Field; New York, NY	W 26–2	18,000	
October 14	at Yale	Yale Bowl; New Haven, CT	L 10–27	10,000	
October 28	Colgate	Baker Field; New York, NY	L 0–6	15,000	
November 4	Cornell	Baker Field; New York, NY (rivalry)	L 7–25	25,000	
November 11	at Penn	Franklin Field; Philadelphia, PA	L 7–35	40,000	
November 18	at Brown	Brown Stadium; Providence, RI	L 0–12	12,000	
November 25	Dartmouth	Baker Field; New York, NY	L 0–18	12,000	
