= 1944 Cornell Big Red football team =

American college football season

1944 Cornell Big Red football
- Conference: Independent
- Record: 5–4
- Head coach: Carl Snavely (9th season)
- Captains: Frank Accorsi; Grant Ellis
- Home stadium: Schoellkopf Field

1944 Eastern college football independents records
	Conf.			Overall
Team	W	L	T	W		L		T
No. 1 Army		–		9	–	0	–	0
Yale		–		7	–	0	–	1
Harvard		–		5	–	1	–	0
Bucknell		–		7	–	2	–	1
Penn State		–		6	–	3	–	0
Penn		–		5	–	3	–	0
Boston College		–		4	–	3	–	0
Cornell		–		5	–	4	–	0
Villanova		–		4	–	4	–	0
Drexel		–		2	–	2	–	0
Pittsburgh		–		4	–	5	–	0
Brown		–		3	–	4	–	1
Temple		–		2	–	4	–	2
Syracuse		–		2	–	4	–	1
Princeton		–		1	–	2	–	0
Dartmouth		–		2	–	5	–	1
Colgate		–		2	–	5	–	0
NYU		–		2	–	5	–	0
Columbia		–		2	–	6	–	0
Tufts		–		1	–	4	–	1
Franklin & Marshall		–		1	–	8	–	0
CCNY		–		0	–	7	–	0
Rankings from AP Poll

The 1944 Cornell Big Red football team was an American football team that represented Cornell University as an independent during the 1944 college football season. In its ninth and final season under head coach Carl Snavely, the team compiled a 5–4 record and outscored its opponents 131 to 130. The team captains were Frank Accorsi and Grant Ellis.

Cornell played its home games at Schoellkopf Field in Ithaca, New York.

== Schedule ==
Date	Time	Opponent	Site	Result	Attendance	Source
September 23		at Syracuse	Archbold Stadium; Syracuse, NY	W 39–6	20,000	
September 30		Bucknell	Schoellkopf Field; Ithaca, NY	W 26–0	7,000	
October 7		at Yale	Yale Bowl; New Haven, CT	L 7–16	25,000	
October 14		Colgate	Schoellkopf Field; Ithaca, NY (rivalry)	L 7–14	7,000	
October 21	3:00 p.m.	Sampson NTS	Schoellkopf Field; Ithaca, NY	W 13–6	3,000	
November 4		at Columbia	Baker Field; New York, NY (rivalry)	W 25–7	25,000	
November 11		vs. No. 3 Navy	Memorial Stadium; Baltimore, MD	L 0–48	25,000	
November 18		Dartmouth	Schoellkopf Field; Ithaca, NY (rivalry)	W 14–13	13,000	
November 25		at Penn	Franklin Field; Philadelphia, PA (rivalry)	L 0–20	50,000	
Rankings from AP Poll released prior to the game; All times are in Eastern time
