= Wayne Williams (American football) =

American football player (1921–2001)

Personal information
- Born: October 24, 1921; Minneapolis, Minnesota, U.S.
- Died: August 18, 2001 (aged 79); Edina, Minnesota, U.S.

Career information
- College: University of Minnesota

Awards and highlights
- NCAA rushing leader (1944); Second-team All-Big Ten (1944)

Wayne Henry "Red" Williams Jr. (October 24, 1921 – August 18, 2001) was an American college football player, who played for the Minnesota Golden Gophers football team from 1942 to 1945.

At Roosevelt High School, Williams was a standout in both baseball and football.

He led the NCAA major colleges in rushing yardage with 911 rushing yards in 1944. He's the only Gopher to ever lead the nation in rushing yards or all-purpose yards for a season. His 1944 average of 7.73 yards per carry and his career average 6.25 yards per carry during his career at Minnesota both remain Minnesota school records. With 1,999 rushing yards, he ranked second behind Pug Lund on Minnesota's career rushing record book at the time of his graduation. He died of congestive heart failure in 2001.

Williams was drafted in the second round of the 1945 NFL draft (13th overall), but never played in the NFL.

After his football career was over he became the manager of WLOL radio and worked in marketing.

== See also ==
- List of college football yearly rushing leaders
