= 1944 Drexel Dragons football team =

American college football season

1944 Drexel Dragons football
- Conference: Independent
- Record: 2–2
- Head coach: Maury McMains (1st season)
- Home stadium: Drexel Field

1944 Eastern college football independents records
	Conf.			Overall
Team	W	L	T	W		L		T
No. 1 Army		–		9	–	0	–	0
Yale		–		7	–	0	–	1
Harvard		–		5	–	1	–	0
Bucknell		–		7	–	2	–	1
Penn State		–		6	–	3	–	0
Penn		–		5	–	3	–	0
Boston College		–		4	–	3	–	0
Cornell		–		5	–	4	–	0
Villanova		–		4	–	4	–	0
Drexel		–		2	–	2	–	0
Pittsburgh		–		4	–	5	–	0
Brown		–		3	–	4	–	1
Temple		–		2	–	4	–	2
Syracuse		–		2	–	4	–	1
Princeton		–		1	–	2	–	0
Dartmouth		–		2	–	5	–	1
Colgate		–		2	–	5	–	0
NYU		–		2	–	5	–	0
Columbia		–		2	–	6	–	0
Tufts		–		1	–	4	–	1
Franklin & Marshall		–		1	–	8	–	0
CCNY		–		0	–	7	–	0
Rankings from AP Poll

1944 Drexel Dragons football team was head coached by Maury McMains.

== Schedule ==
Date	Time	Opponent	Site	Result
October 21	2:00 pm	at Bloomsburg	Bloomsburg, PA	L 6–20
October 28		at Lehigh	Bethlehem, PA	W 13–6
November 4		Haverford	Drexel Field; Philadelphia, PA	L 7–13
November 11	2:00 pm	Bloomsburg	Drexel Field; Philadelphia, PA	W 30–0
All times are in Eastern time

== Roster ==
1944 Drexel Dragons football team roster
Players
Coaches
Offense

Pos.	#	Name	Class
QB	48	Dick Dowd
HB	26	McFarland
HB	32	George Lechler
FB	11	John Christie
TE	24	Drummond	Jr
OT	14	Davis
G	68	Kuter
C	53	Grand
G	30	Marchionni
OT	43	Lebidine
TE	35	Horrocks
[[American football positions|]]	12	Coneys
[[American football positions|]]	15	Fenton
[[American football positions|]]	21	Goldfarb
[[American football positions|]]	22	Kouvatas
[[American football positions|]]	25	Goldshalk
[[American football positions|]]	28	Kimmel
[[American football positions|]]	31	Harvath
[[American football positions|]]	36	Martinelli
[[American football positions|]]	37	Stizenman
HB	39	Bob McCracken
[[American football positions|]]	42	Emsley
[[American football positions|]]	44	Phelan
[[American football positions|]]	46	Allen
OT	52	Simon
[[American football positions|]]	55	Isen
TE	58	Fernon
[[American football positions|]]	59	Dubroff
[[American football positions|]]	62	Koitzsch
[[American football positions|]]	65	Jarret
[[American football positions|]]	66	Leone
[[American football positions|]]	69	LaVergatta

Defense

Pos.	#	Name	Class

Special teams

Pos.	#	Name	Class

Head coach

- Maury McMains (McDaniel)

Coordinators/assistant coaches

Legend

- (C) Team captain
- (S) Suspended
- (I) Ineligible
- Injured
- Redshirt
