= Chris Creighton =

American football player and coach (born 1969)

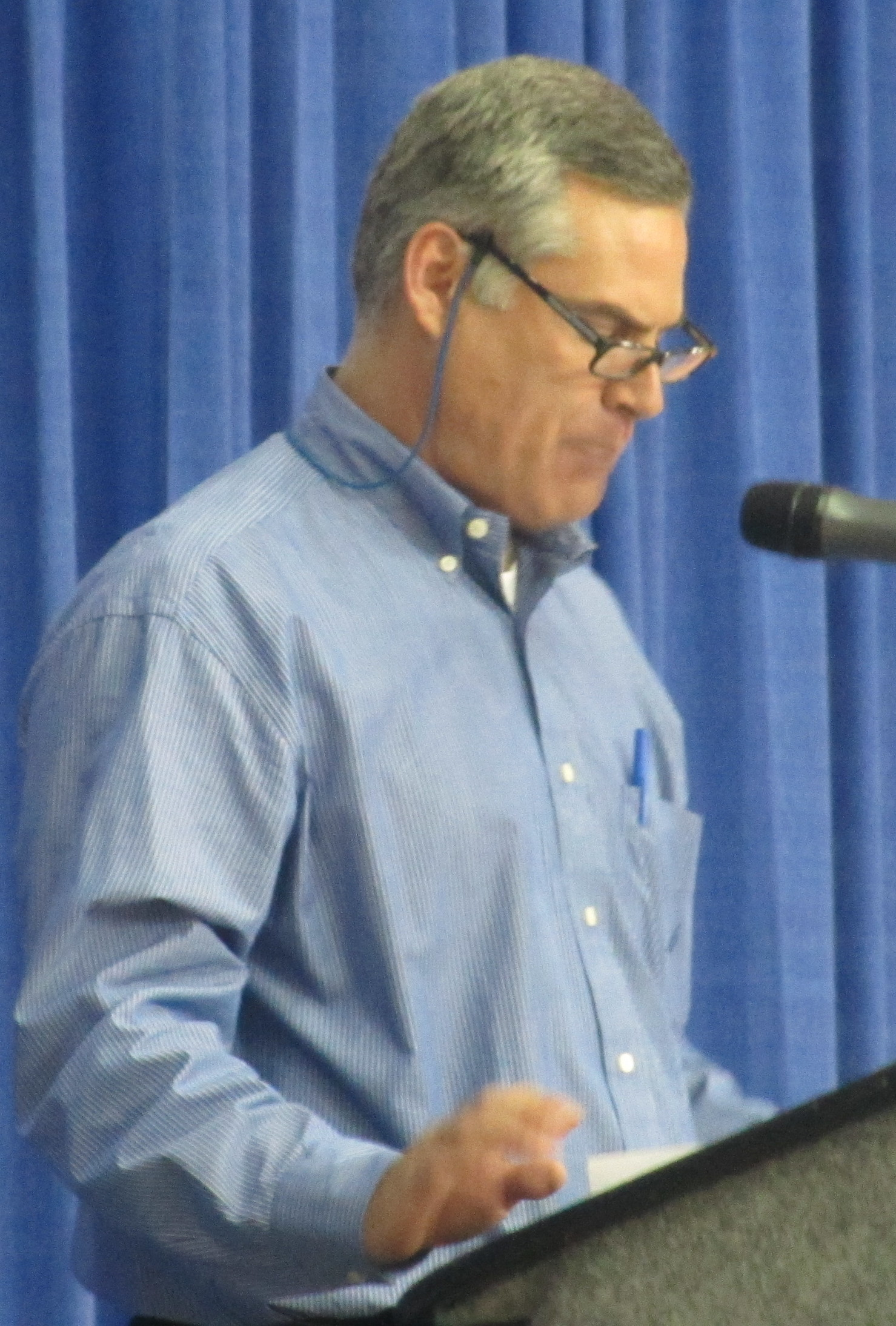
- Creighton in 2013

Current position
- Title: Head coach
- Team: Eastern Michigan
- Conference: Mid-American
- Record: 65–90

Biographical details
- Born: February 7, 1969 (age 57); San Francisco, California, U.S.
- Education: Kenyon College (BA); Concordia University Chicago (MA)

Playing career
- 1988–1990: Kenyon
- Position: Quarterback

Coaching career (HC unless noted)
- 1991–1992: Concordia (IL) (OC)
- 1993: Limhamn Griffins
- 1993–1996: Manchester (IN) (OC)
- 1997–2000: Ottawa (KS)
- 2001–2007: Wabash
- 2008–2013: Drake
- 2014–present: Eastern Michigan

Head coaching record
- Overall: 204–136
- Bowls: 1–5
- Tournaments: 0–2 (NAIA playoffs); 5–3 (NCAA D-III playoffs)

Accomplishments and honors

Championships
- 2 KCAC (1997, 2000); 4 NCAC (2002, 2005–2007); 2 PFL (2011–2012); 1 MAC West (2022)

Awards
- KCAC Coach of the Year (1997); 3x NCAC Coach of the Year (2002, 2005, 2007)

Christopher William Creighton (born February 7, 1969) is an American football coach and former player. He is currently the head coach at Eastern Michigan University, a position he has held since the 2014 season. Creighton has served as the head coach at three other schools: Ottawa University (1997–2000), Wabash College (2001–2007), and Drake University (2008–2013).

Creighton played quarterback at Kenyon College where he established several North Coast Athletic Conference records (since broken). As the head coach at Wabash in the early 2000s, he turned the school into a national contender at the NCAA Division III level. At Drake, he shared back-to-back Pioneer Football League conference titles. Creighton holds the unusual distinction of having won football games on three different continents.

In 1993, he played professionally for the Limhamn Griffins, a Swedish club team, and won the Superserien league championship as the team's quarterback.

In 2011, he coached Drake in an exhibition game in the Sheikh Amri Abeid Memorial Stadium in Arusha, Tanzania, defeating a Mexican all-star team. In addition, he coached Wabash in exhibition games in Austria and Panama.

== Playing career ==
Creighton was born on February 7, 1969, and grew up in San Francisco. He attended his first Oakland Raiders game at the age of eight. Creighton remained a "diehard" Raiders fan even as his playing and coaching career pulled him east. His family moved to Seattle, where Creighton attended Roosevelt High School and played quarterback on the football team. For college, Creighton chose Kenyon College in Gambier, Ohio, where he played quarterback from 1988 to 1990. In 1989 Kenyon won a share of the North Coast Athletic Conference (NCAC) title, Kenyon's first and as of 2020 only conference championship. In 1990 Creighton's 29 touchdown passes set an NCAC record which stood until 2001 when Wabash College's Jake Knott–playing under Creighton–eclipsed it. His 48 passing touchdowns over his two years as a starter were also an NCAC record until Kenyon's Brad Hensley surpassed it in 1994. Kenyon inducted Creighton into its athletic hall of fame in 2008. While at Kenyon, Creighton studied abroad in Ecuador, kindling an interest in developing countries.

In 1993, he signed to play professionally for Limhamn Griffins in Sweden's top league Superserien. As the team's quarterback, Creighton led the Griffins to win the Swedish league championship.

== Coaching career ==
=== Concordia and Sweden ===
Following graduation in 1991, Creighton became offensive coordinator (OC) at Concordia University Chicago under Jim Braun while working on his master's degree, which he completed in 1993. In the spring of 1993, he received an opportunity to play quarterback for Sweden's Limhamn Griffins, where he also served as a coach. The Griffins won the Superserien championship.

=== Manchester ===
Creighton returned to the United States in the fall of 1993 to become offensive coordinator at Manchester College in North Manchester, Indiana, under Dale Liston. Still in Sweden when the job became available, Creighton applied for it over the phone. Creighton spent four seasons at Manchester, continuing under Dave Harms after the latter replaced Liston following the 1994 season. His offenses set ten new school records during his tenure.

=== Ottawa (KS) ===
Creighton's first head coaching job was at Ottawa University in Ottawa, Kansas, from 1997 to 2000. Ottawa competed as part of the National Association of Intercollegiate Athletics (NAIA). He succeeded Dave Dallas, who had taken the head coaching job at Kansas Wesleyan University. In those four seasons, Creighton's teams went 32–9 and won the Kansas Collegiate Athletic Conference championship in 1997 and 2000. He was the head football coach for the Ottawa University Braves and ranked fourth in school history in total wins and first in winning percentage (.780). Creighton, who has a life-long interest in mountain climbing, took his seniors on mountain-climbing trips. Creighton explained that the trips encouraged personal growth: "You're doing something that maybe you didn't think you could do...I just think you grow as a person in those situations." Steve Ryan, then an assistant coach, carried over the practice of mountain hikes when he became head coach at Morningside College. Ryan credited the hikes with improving the senior leadership of the team.

=== Wabash ===
Creighton departed Ottawa after the 2000 season to become the head coach at Wabash College, replacing Greg Carlson. Wabash, like Kenyon and Manchester, competed in NCAA Division III. The move returned him to the NCAC, and his first game was against Manchester and his mentor, Dave Harms. Creighton was at Wabash from 2001 to 2007, and turned the program into a "national championship contender." His career coaching record at Wabash was 63–15, ranking him third in school history in total wins and fifth in winning percentage (.808). In 2002, Creighton led Wabash to an undefeated season and its first playoff appearance since 1977, earning him NCAC coach of the year honors. He would also be named NCAC coach of the year in 2005 and 2007. On departing Wabash for Drake after the 2007 season, Creighton called his years at Wabash "the best years of my life, both on the field and off." Under Creighton, Wabash played exhibition games in Austria, losing (against the Vienna Vikings) and winning in Panama.

While head coach at Wabash, Creighton began a practice of writing to national championship-winning coaches to seek their advice on building a successful team. One such coach, Ohio State's Jim Tressel, later called Creighton "one of [his] favorites", and acted as a reference for Creighton when the latter applied for the Drake job.

=== Drake ===
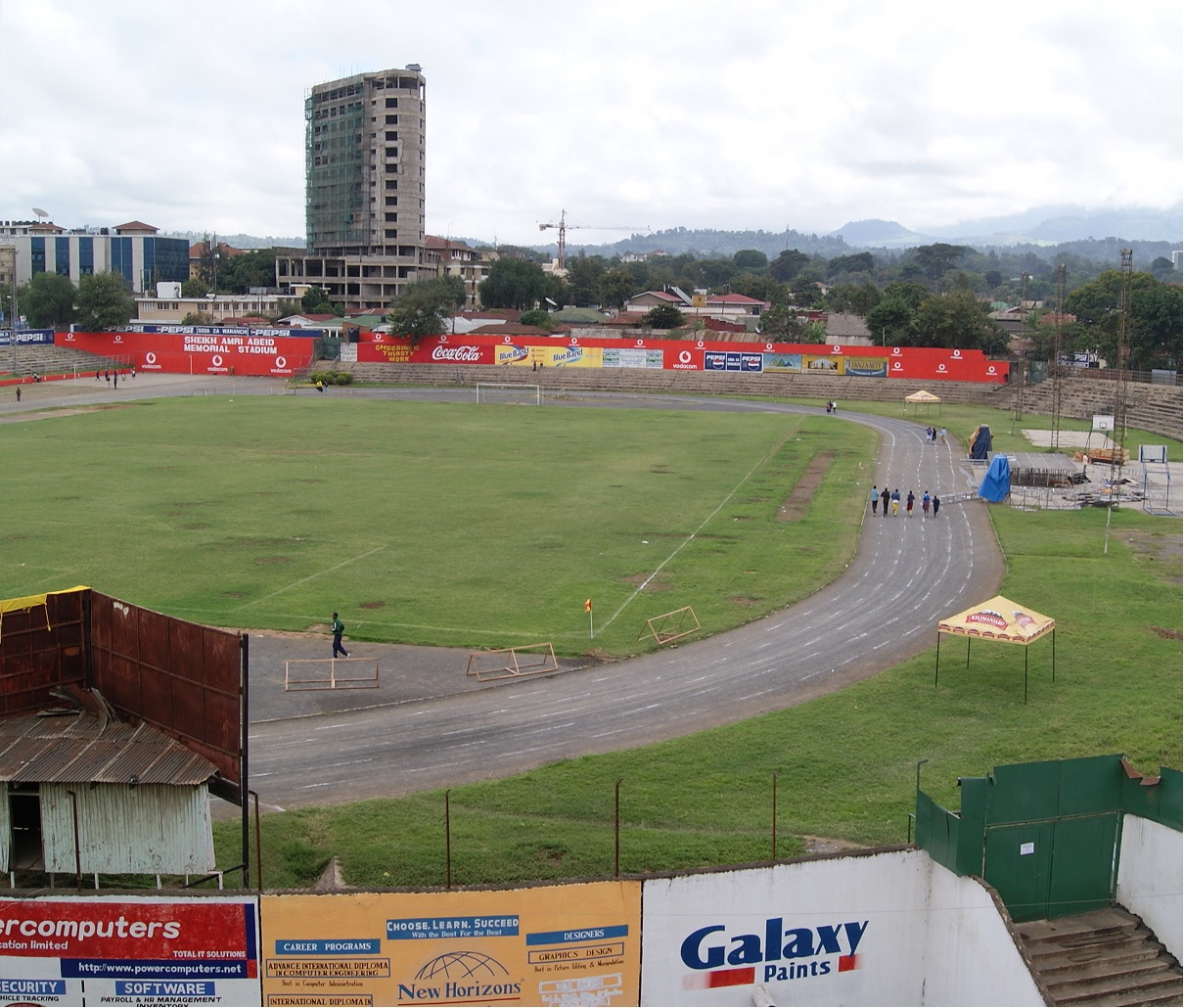
Sheikh Amri Abeid Memorial Stadium in Arusha, Tanzania, played host to the first football game in Africa.

On December 22, 2007, Creighton was named the head football coach at Drake University in Des Moines, Iowa, replacing interim head coach Steve Loney. Drake, a member of the non-football Missouri Valley Conference, played football in the Pioneer Football League, a Football Championship Subdivision (FCS) conference whose members do not award scholarships for football. Creighton coached at Drake from 2008 to 2013, compiling a record of 41–22. Although NCAA regulations prevented Creighton from leading mountain climbing trips such as those he had at Ottawa, an unofficial tradition of climbing Pikes Peak developed during his tenure. In 2011 Creighton's interests in developing countries and mountain climbing intersected when he helped organize the 2011 Kilimanjaro Bowl, the first football game to be played on the African continent. Drake defeated a team of Mexican all-stars 17–7, giving Creighton a victory on his third continent. During the trip, which also included various service-learning activities, Creighton led his players on a six-day hike up Mount Kilimanjaro. Under Creighton, Drake shared the Pioneer League title in 2011 and 2012.

=== Eastern Michigan ===
On December 11, 2013, Creighton was named the head football coach at Eastern Michigan University in Ypsilanti, Michigan, replacing Ron English. Eastern Michigan competed in the Mid-American Conference (MAC) of the Football Bowl Subdivision (FBS). It was Creighton's first job at that level of competition. Creighton inherited a difficult situation. Eastern Michigan had not had a winning season since 1995 nor gone to a bowl game since 1987. English had gone 11–46 over the past five seasons; in his first two seasons, Creighton won only three games. Amid public criticism, including calls by the faculty union and student government in early 2016 for the school to move down to FCS, the university reaffirmed its commitment to Creighton and staying in FBS. Continuing the mountain-climbing tradition from his other coaching stops, Creighton instituted an annual trip to Pikes Peak for the team's seniors.

In 2016, Creighton led Eastern to a 7–5 regular season record, its first winning season in twenty years. Eastern was invited to the 2016 Bahamas Bowl, its first postseason appearance since the 1987 California Bowl. It was also the sixth different country in which Creighton had coached a game. That season included a victory over Rutgers, Eastern's first victory over a "Power Five" opponent. By the 2018 season, average attendance at home games had increased from 4,000 to 15,000. The improved performance protected the football program in early 2018 when budget cuts eliminated four other sports, amid ongoing controversy within the campus community as to whether the program, successful or no, was worth funding.

Creighton's performance at Eastern, regarded as one of, if not the "toughest place to win in Division I football", attracted attention from other programs. Following the 2018 season, Creighton was a rumored candidate for the head coach job at Temple University that eventually went to Rod Carey. Creighton's was one of several names floated during the intermittent negotiations between Greg Schiano and Rutgers which culminated in Schiano's return. In 2019, Eastern finished 6–7 after losing to the University of Pittsburgh in the Quick Lane Bowl; it was the first time Eastern had qualified for the postseason in back-to-back years. Creighton assumed the role of offensive coordinator for the 2020 season after Aaron Keen, OC for the last three seasons and on the staff since 2014, departed to become head coach at Washington University in St. Louis.

== Personal life ==
Creighton is married to his wife, Heather. They have three children. Creighton is a Christian. At the age of 16 he joined Teen Missions International, an interdenominational Christian mission organization. Creighton credits the organization with eliminating his use of profanity, unusual in the coaching ranks.

== Head coaching record ==
Year	Team	Overall	Conference	Standing	Bowl/playoffs
Ottawa Braves (Kansas Collegiate Athletic Conference) (1997–2000)
1997	Ottawa	9–2	7–1	T–1st	L NAIA First Round
1998	Ottawa	8–2	6–2	2nd	
1999	Ottawa	6–3	5–3	T–3rd	
2000	Ottawa	9–2	9–0	1st	L NAIA First Round
Ottawa:		32–9	27–6		
Wabash Little Giants (North Coast Athletic Conference) (2001–2007)
2001	Wabash	8–2	6–1	T–2nd	
2002	Wabash	12–1	7–0	1st	L NCAA Division III Quarterfinal
2003	Wabash	7–3	4–2	T–2nd	
2004	Wabash	6–4	4–3	T–4th	
2005	Wabash	11–1	7–0	1st	L NCAA Division III Second Round
2006	Wabash	8–2	6–1	T–1st	
2007	Wabash	11–2	7–0	1st	L NCAA Division III Quarterfinal
Wabash:		63–15	41–7		
Drake Bulldogs (Pioneer Football League) (2008–2013)
2008	Drake	6–5	4–4	T–4th	
2009	Drake	8–3	6–2	T–3rd	
2010	Drake	7–4	6–2	3rd	
2011	Drake	9–2	7–1	T–1st	
2012	Drake	8–3	7–1	T–1st	
2013	Drake	6–5	5–3	T–4th	
Drake:		44–22	35–13		
Eastern Michigan Eagles (Mid-American Conference) (2014–present)
2014	Eastern Michigan	2–10	1–7	6th (West)	
2015	Eastern Michigan	1–11	0–8	6th (West)	
2016	Eastern Michigan	7–6	4–4	4th (West)	L Bahamas
2017	Eastern Michigan	5–7	3–5	5th (West)	
2018	Eastern Michigan	7–6	5–3	T–2nd (West)	L Camellia
2019	Eastern Michigan	6–7	3–5	T–5th (West)	L Quick Lane
2020	Eastern Michigan	2–4	2–4	5th (West)	
2021	Eastern Michigan	7–6	4–4	T–4th (West)	L LendingTree
2022	Eastern Michigan	9–4	5–3	T–1st (West)	W Famous Idaho Potato
2023	Eastern Michigan	6–7	4–4	3rd (West)	L 68 Ventures
2024	Eastern Michigan	5–7	2–6	T–9th	
2025	Eastern Michigan	4–8	3–5	T–9th	
2026	Eastern Michigan	4–7	3–4		
Eastern Michigan:		65–90	39–62		
Total:		204–136			
National championship Conference title Conference division title or championship game berth
