= 1944 Southwestern Pirates football team =

American college football season

1944 Southwestern Pirates football

Sun Bowl, W 35–0 vs. UNAM
- Conference: Texas Conference
- Record: 7–5 (0–0 Texas)
- Head coach: Randolph M. Medley (6th season)
- Captain: Ed J. "Blotz" Blodzinski

The 1944 Southwestern Pirates football team represented Southwestern University during the 1944 college football season. The Pirates were coached by Randolph M. Medley, compiled a 7–5 record, and were invited to the Sun Bowl, where they defeated the UNAM Pumas, champions of American football in Mexico. This was also the first time an American football team had played in a bowl with a team from Mexico, the phenomenon not occurring again until the 2011 Kilimanjaro Bowl.

== Schedule ==
Date	Opponent	Site	Result	Attendance	Source
September 17	at Galveston AAF*	Galveston, TX	W 32–6		
September 23	at Louisiana Tech*	Tech Stadium; Ruston, LA	W 26–0	3,500	
September 30	at Texas*	War Memorial Stadium; Austin, TX	L 0–20	14,500	
October 5	John Tarleton*	Georgetown, TX	W 18–0		
October 7	at SMU*	Ownby Stadium; Dallas, TX	L 15–16		
October 13	North Texas Aggies*^{†}	Georgetown, TX	W 39–7	1,500	
October 21	at Texas Tech*	Tech Field; Lubbock, TX	W 21–19		
November 3	South Plains AAF*	Georgetown, TX	W 21–6		
November 11	at Tulsa*	Skelly Field; Tulsa, OK	L 6–51	8,000	
November 18	at No. 2 Randolph Field*	Alamo Stadium; San Antonio, TX	L 0–54	652	
December 2	at Rice*	Rice Field; Houston, TX	L 7–18		
January 1, 1945	vs. UNAM*	Kidd Field; El Paso, TX (Sun Bowl)	W 35–0	13,000	
*Non-conference game; ^{†}Homecoming; Rankings from AP Poll released prior to the game
