= 1945 Cotton Bowl Classic =

- 9th Cotton Bowl Classic
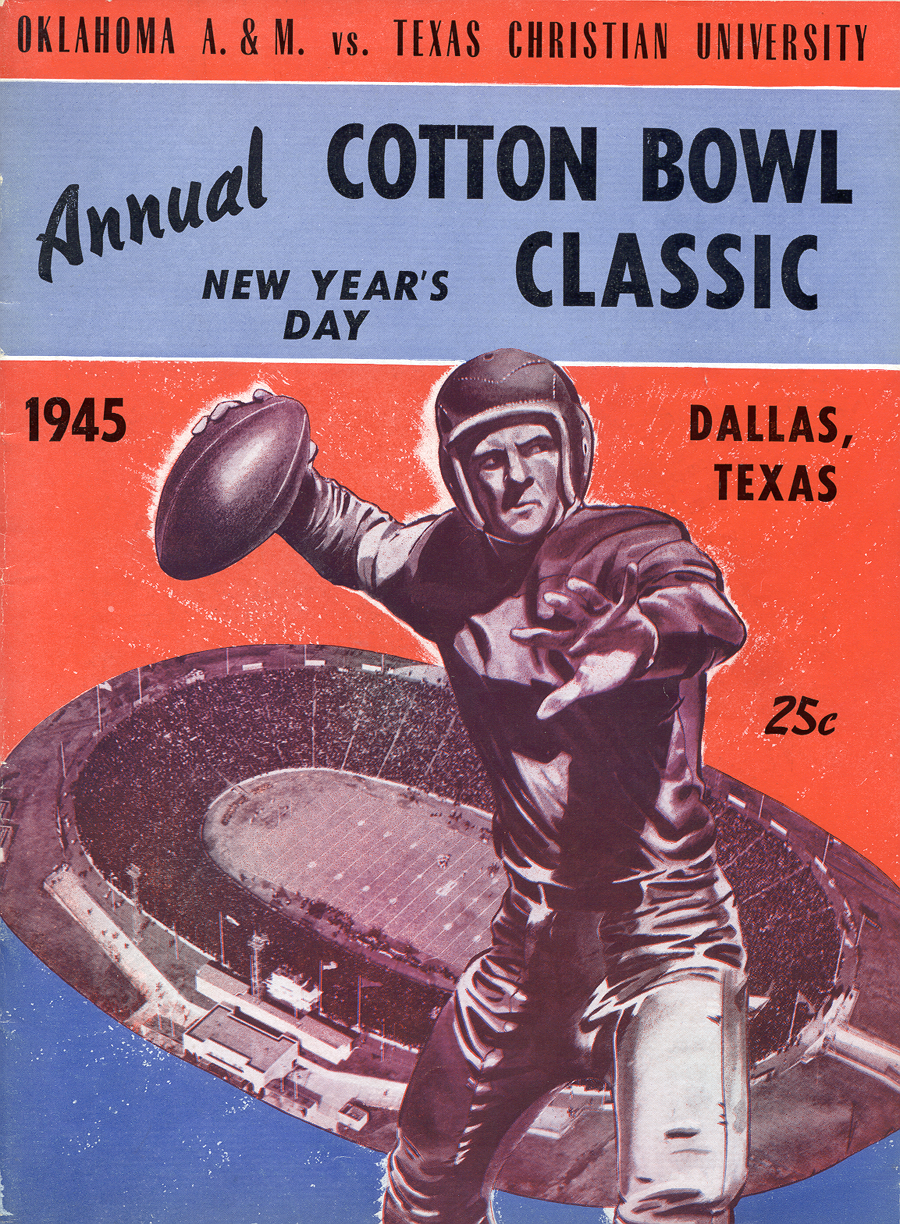
Oklahoma A&M Cowboys	TCU Horned Frogs
(7–1)	(7–2–1)
MVC	SWC
34	0
Head coach: Jim Lookabaugh	Head coach: Dutch Meyer
	1	2	3	4	Total
Oklahoma A&M	14	0	7	13	34
TCU	0	0	0	0	0
- Date: January 1, 1945
- Season: 1944
- Stadium: Cotton Bowl
- Location: Dallas, Texas
- MVP: End Neill Armstrong (Oklahoma A&M); RB Bob Fenimore (Oklahoma A&M); DT Ralph Foster (Texas)
- Referee: Harry Viner (SWC; split crew: SWC, Missouri Valley)
- Attendance: 37,500

The Cotton Bowl in Dallas, Texas, hosted the Cotton Bowl Classic.

The 1945 Cotton Bowl Classic featured the TCU Horned Frogs and the Oklahoma A&M Cowboys.

== Background ==
Oklahoma A&M won the Missouri Valley Conference and had only lost to Norman NAS (a naval team). TCU was lucky to be there, with a 7–2–1 record and 3–1–1 conference record. This was Oklahoma A&M's first bowl game.

== Game summary ==
The game started with and ended with an Oklahoma A&M touchdown. Bob Fenimore had two touchdown runs with additional touchdowns by Jim Spavital, Joe Thomas, and Mack Creage the game was dominated by A&M, who had long drives of 59, 61, 62, 40, and 66 all result in touchdowns while TCU turned the ball over twice and let Oklahoma A&M run the ball 60 times in one of the more lopsided Cotton Bowl games.

== Aftermath ==
Oklahoma A&M would win the Sugar Bowl the year after, but they would not reach another Cotton Bowl until 2003 (now known as Oklahoma State) and has not won one since the 1945 game. TCU would reach the Cotton Bowl four more times from 1951 to 1958.

Statistics	TCU	Oklahoma A&M
First downs	5	20
Yards rushing	74	295
Yards passing	31	199
Total yards	105	494
Punts-Average	8-34.3	6-26.3
Fumbles-Lost	2-1	1-1
Interceptions	1	0
Penalties-Yards	5-25	7-75
