= 1944 UNAM Pumas football team =

American college football season

1944 UNAM Pumas football

Liga Mayor champions

Sun Bowl, L 0–35 vs. Southwestern (TX)
- Conference: Independent
- Record: 5–1–1
- Head coach: Bernard A. Hoban (3rd season)
- Offensive scheme: Modified T-formation

The 1944 UNAM Pumas football team (also known as Pumas Dorados) represented the National Autonomous University of Mexico (UNAM) during the 1944 college football season. The Pumas were coached by Bernard A. Hoban, compiled a 5–1–1, and were invited to the 1945 Sun Bowl, where they were defeated by the Southwestern Pirates. This was the first time an American football team had played in a bowl with a team from Mexico, which did not occur again until the 2011 Kilimanjaro Bowl. Despite the Sun Bowl loss, UNAM claimed their 12th consecutive national championship, a streak dating back to 1933.

== Schedule ==
Date	Opponent	Site	Result	Attendance	Source
	YMCA		W 25–0		
	Mexico Educacion		W 32–0		
	Politécnico		T 6–6		
	YMCA		W 14–12		
	Mexico Educacion		W 51–6		
November 26	at South Plains AAF	Tech Field; Lubbock, TX	cancelled		
December 16	Politécnico	Mexico City, MX	W 8–0		
January 1, 1945	vs. Southwestern (TX)	Kidd Field; El Paso, TX (Sun Bowl)	L 0–35	13,000	
