= 1944 Texas Longhorns football team =

American college football season

1944 Texas Longhorns football
- Conference: Southwest Conference
- Record: 5–4 (3–2 SWC)
- Head coach: Dana X. Bible (8th season)
- Home stadium: War Memorial Stadium

1944 Southwest Conference football standings
	Conf.					Overall
Team	W		L		T	W		L		T
TCU $	3	–	1	–	1	7	–	3	–	1
Texas	3	–	2	–	0	5	–	4	–	0
Arkansas	2	–	2	–	1	5	–	5	–	1
Texas A&M	2	–	3	–	0	7	–	4	–	0
SMU	2	–	3	–	0	5	–	5	–	0
Rice	2	–	3	–	0	5	–	6	–	0
$ – Conference champion

The 1944 Texas Longhorns football team was an American football team that represented the University of Texas (now known as the University of Texas at Austin) as a member of the Southwest Conference (SWC) during the 1944 college football season. In their eighth year under head coach Dana X. Bible, the Longhorns compiled an overall record of 5–4, with a mark of 3–2 in conference play, and finished second in the SWC.

== Schedule ==
Date	Opponent	Site	Result	Attendance	Source
September 30	Southwestern (TX)*	War Memorial Stadium; Austin, TX	W 20–0	14,500	
October 7	No. 4 Randolph Field*	War Memorial Stadium; Austin, TX	L 6–42	19,000	
October 14	vs. Oklahoma*	Cotton Bowl; Dallas, TX (rivalry)	W 20–0	23,000	
October 21	at Arkansas	Quigley Stadium; Little Rock, AR (rivalry)	W 19–0	10,000	
October 28	at Rice	Rice Field; Houston, TX (rivalry)	L 0–7	25,000	
November 4	SMU	War Memorial Stadium; Austin, TX	W 34–7	12,000	
November 11	Oklahoma A&M*	War Memorial Stadium; Austin, TX	L 8–13	13,000	
November 18	at TCU	Amon G. Carter Stadium; Fort Worth, TX (rivalry)	L 6–7	2,000	
November 30	Texas A&M	War Memorial Stadium; Austin, TX (rivalry)	W 6–0	43,000	
*Non-conference game; Rankings from AP Poll released prior to the game
