= 1944 SMU Mustangs football team =

American college football season

1944 SMU Mustangs football
- Conference: Southwest Conference
- Record: 5–5 (2–3 SWC)
- Head coach: Jimmy Stewart (3rd season)
- Captains: Charles D. Allen; Ivan Cunningham
- Home stadium: Ownby Stadium

1944 Southwest Conference football standings
	Conf.					Overall
Team	W		L		T	W		L		T
TCU $	3	–	1	–	1	7	–	3	–	1
Texas	3	–	2	–	0	5	–	4	–	0
Arkansas	2	–	2	–	1	5	–	5	–	1
Texas A&M	2	–	3	–	0	7	–	4	–	0
SMU	2	–	3	–	0	5	–	5	–	0
Rice	2	–	3	–	0	5	–	6	–	0
$ – Conference champion

The 1944 SMU Mustangs football team was an American football team that represented Southern Methodist University (SMU) as a member of the Southwest Conference (SWC) during the 1944 college football season. In their third season under head coach Jimmy Stewart, the Mustangs compiled a 5–5 record (2–3 against conference opponents) and were outscored by a total of 201 to 131. The team played its home games at Ownby Stadium in the University Park suburb of Dallas.

== Schedule ==
Date	Opponent	Site	Result	Attendance	Source
September 30	North Texas Aggies*	Ownby Stadium; University Park, TX	W 49–0	5,000	
October 7	Southwestern (TX)*	Ownby Stadium; University Park, TX	W 16–15		
October 14	at No. 4 Randolph Field*	Alamo Stadium; San Antonio, TX	L 0–41	18,000	
October 21	at Rice	Rice Field; Houston, TX	L 10–21		
October 28	at Tulane*	Tulane Stadium; New Orleans, LA	L 7–27	22,000	
November 4	at Texas	War Memorial Stadium; Austin, TX	L 7–34	12,000	
November 11	Texas A&M	Ownby Stadium; University Park, TX	L 6–39	17,000	
November 18	Arkansas	Ownby Stadium; University Park, TX	W 20–12		
November 25	at Texas Tech*	Tech Field; Lubbock, TX	W 7–6	5,000	
December 2	TCU	Ownby Stadium; University Park, TX	W 9–6	8,000	
*Non-conference game; Rankings from AP Poll released prior to the game
