= Schollmaier Arena =

Basketball arena in Fort Worth, Texas

Ed and Rae Schollmaier Arena
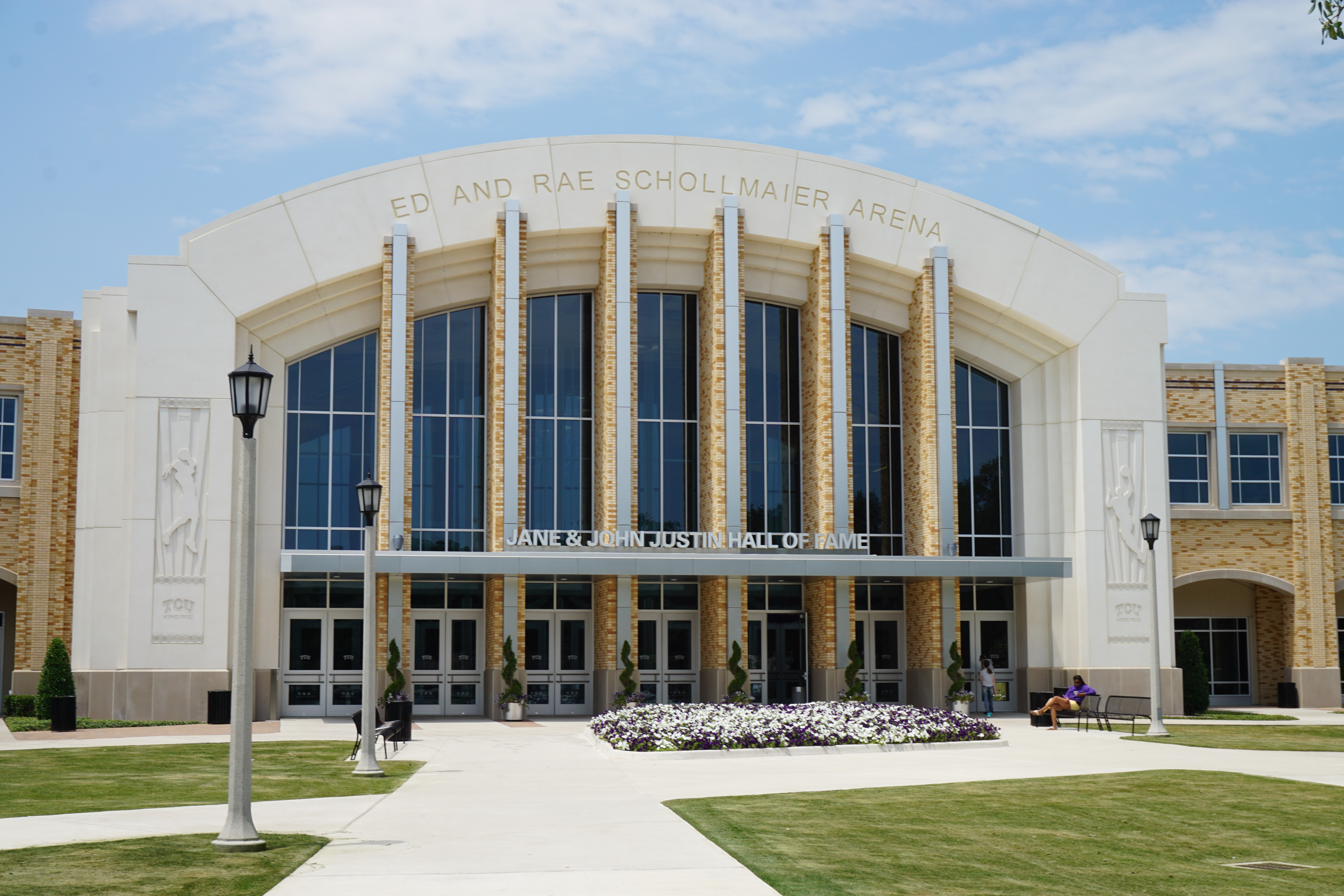
- Interactive map of Ed and Rae Schollmaier Arena
- Former names: Daniel-Meyer Coliseum (1961–2015)
- Location: 2900 Stadium Drive; Fort Worth, TX 76109
- Coordinates: 32.708774°N 97.36673°W
- Owner: Texas Christian University
- Operator: Texas Christian University
- Capacity: 6,800
- Surface: Connor Uni-Force floor
- Scoreboard: Yes

Construction
- Groundbreaking: March 1961; March 2014
- Opened: December 14, 1961; November 20, 2015
- Renovated: 2014–2015
- Closed: February 2014
- Demolished: March 2014 (renovations)
- Cost: 1961: US$1.45 million ($15.6 million in 2025 dollars); 2015 renovation: $80 million
- Architects: 1961: Joseph R. Pelich; 2015 renovation: HKS Inc.
- General contractors: 1961: Cadenheard Company; 2015 renovation: Austin Commercial

Tenant
- TCU Horned Frogs (NCAA DI) (1961–present)

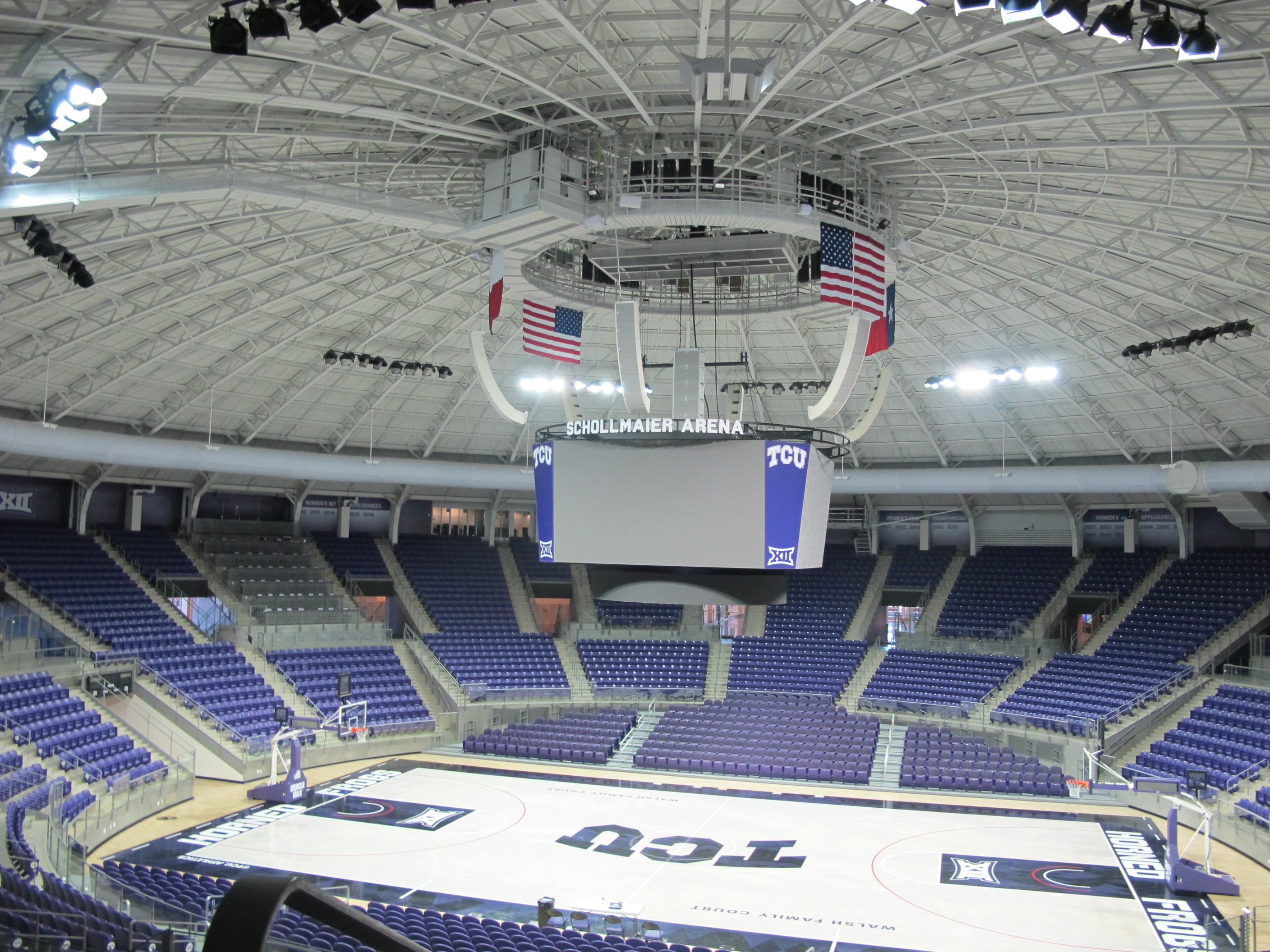
TCU Arena Interior 2016

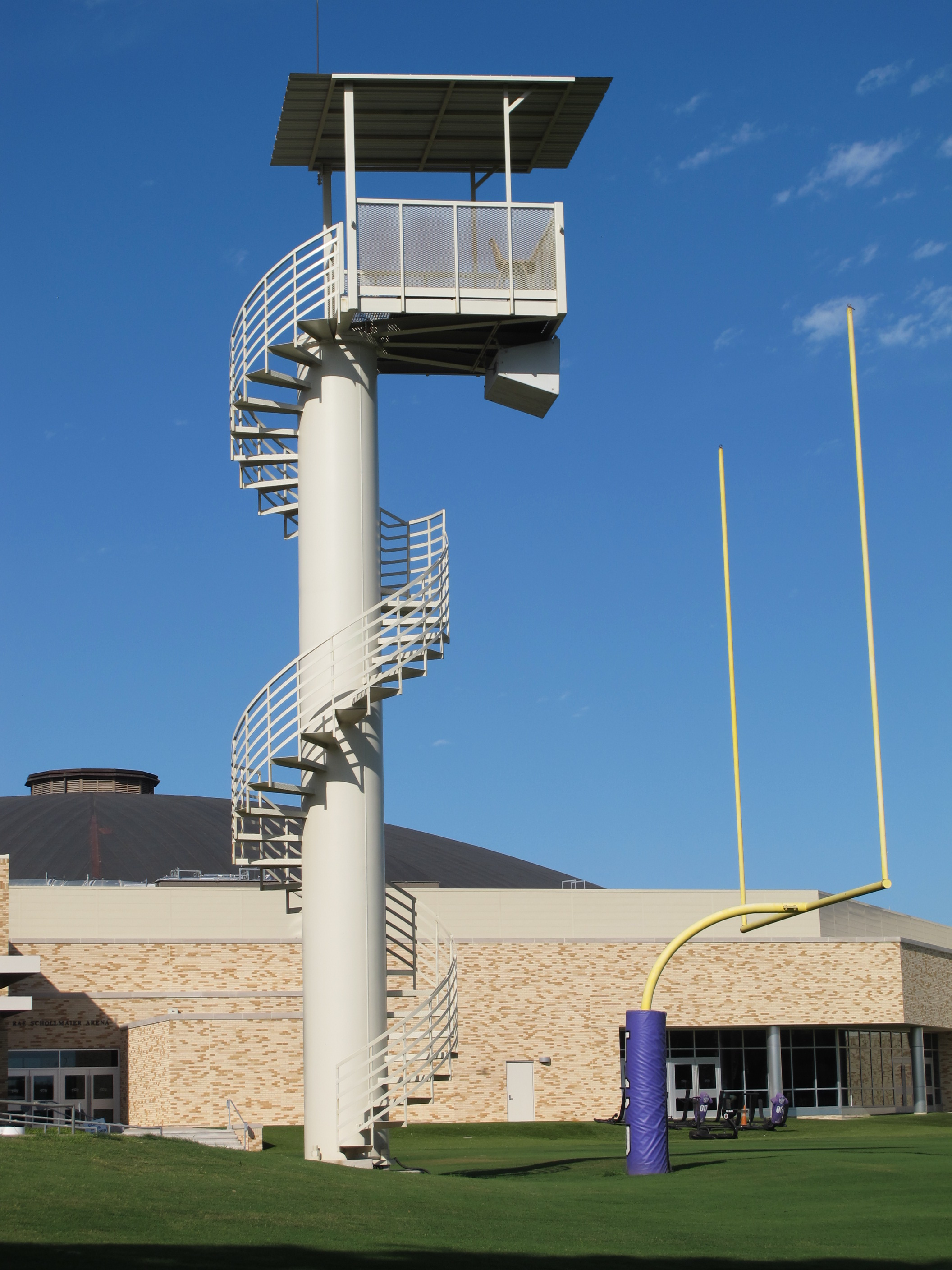
Arena Sitting Behind Baugh Indoor Football Facility, 2016

Ed & Rae Schollmaier Arena, formerly known as Daniel–Meyer Coliseum, is a basketball arena located on the campus of Texas Christian University (TCU) in Fort Worth, Texas, United States. The arena is part of the Daniel-Meyer Athletics Complex and sits between Amon G. Carter Stadium and Sam Baugh Indoor Practice Facility. The arena is home to the TCU Horned Frogs Men's and Women's basketball teams. It was built in 1961 and originally named after former TCU football and basketball coach Dutch Meyer and former TCU board member Milton Daniel. As part of the 2015 renovation, the facility was renamed for lead donors Ed & Rae Schollmaier. The facility currently seats 6,800 people.

== History ==
=== First men's basketball Big XII home win ===
Prior to the TCU vs. KU men's basketball game on February 6, 2013, the TCU men's basketball team was 9–12 (0–8 Big 12) with their last win being Sunday, December 30 against Mississippi Valley State. University of Kansas was 19–2 prior to playing TCU, coming off a loss at home, in Lawrence, Kansas, against the Oklahoma State Cowboys.

The TCU men's basketball team took out the Kansas Jayhawks men's basketball team, ranked #5 at the time, in the Daniel–Meyer Coliseum on February 6, 2013. The game was scheduled to tip off at 8:00 pm CT and air on ESPNU. It took the Jayhawks over seven minutes from the start of the game to make a field goal. The score going into halftime was 22–13 in TCU's favor. Kansas head coach Bill Self sounded furious with the play of his Kansas Basketball team, as he said in a post game interview, “It was the worst team that Kansas ever put on the floor, since Dr. Naismith was there.”

Senior guard Garlon Green, whose brother is Gerald Green, scored a team high with 20 points on his 100th consecutive game for the Horned Frogs. The final score was 62–55 in TCU's favor, and as soon as time expired, TCU students and fans rushed the court to celebrate their first Big 12 victory. The highest ranked squad TCU had beaten prior to the game was #6 Oklahoma on December 27, 1987.

Daniel–Meyer Coliseum had a record crowd of 7,412 fans on February 6, which broke the previous record of 7,267 from December 1, 2003 against Kansas. In the 2014 game against Kansas, there were 7,494 fans in attendance, breaking the record set on February 6, 2013. TCU lost in the team's second Big 12 game against the University of Kansas at the DMC 69–91. Andrew Wiggins scored a game high 27 against the Horned Frogs. Ed and Rae Schollmaier Arena had a record crowd of 8,412 fans on January 25, 2022, against the University of Texas at Austin, which broke the previous record of 7,494 on January 25, 2014.

=== First women's basketball Big XII home win ===
The TCU Lady Frogs faced the Oklahoma State women's basketball team on February 20, 2013. TCU came into the game with a 7–17 record (0–13 in the Big 12). The game tipped off at 8:00 pm ET, with TCU still winless in Big 12 women's basketball, but the TCU Lady Frogs scored 11 unanswered points to beat OSU 64–63 and win their first Big 12 game. Delisa Gross scored the game winner with 1:04 left to put the Frogs up by one. The Oklahoma State Cowgirls women's basketball team was ranked #23 going into the game.

TCU went on to beat the Iowa State Cyclones 61–58 in the Daniel–Meyer Coliseum on Saturday, March 2, 2013. The Cyclones were ranked #23 at the time of the game, with a record of 20–6 (11–5 in the Big 12). Zahna Medley scored 18 points for the Lady Frogs to help secure a win over Iowa State. Delisa Ross contributed 15 points of her own for the Lady Frogs on her final game in the DMC as a TCU Horned Frog. This was the second, and last, Big 12 win for the Lady Frogs of the 2012-13 basketball season.

== Renovations ==
Schollmaier Arena has a four-panel LED scoreboard, along with LED sideline boards. The cost of the new screens came to be $1.5 million. The screens are used during the games to show the live feed, highlights, and company promotions.

On April 16, 2013, the university announced plans for a $45 million renovation to the arena. The project transformed the 53-year-old facility into a modern arena, with widened concourses, additional bathrooms and upgraded concessions. The proposed facade remade the outdated exterior of the venue into something resembling the brick and art deco architecture of the neighboring Amon G. Carter Stadium. The court was lowered several feet to accommodate additional rows of seating that would fill in the large curves currently on either side of the court, giving fans courtside seating and much closer views of the action. Among the many additions and upgrades were a courtside club on the floor level for season ticket holders and new offices for TCU athletic staff coaches of sports such as soccer, tennis and golf. New locker rooms for both TCU and visiting teams and team meeting rooms were added. TCU was forced to play at another area arena during the 2014-15 season.

The project was formally approved by the university on November 7, 2013, with construction beginning in March 2014. Fences were set up around the arena with outdoor print of the future design of the Daniel–Meyer Coliseum. The new arena's renovation was scheduled for completion in October 2015. During the renovations, the university agreed to play games at Wilkerson-Greines Activity Center, a 4,759-seat arena adjacent to Tarrant County College and owned by the Fort Worth Independent School District and located approximately 15 minutes southeast of campus.

On July 30, 2015, TCU revised the total cost of the renovations to over $80 million, and announced the facility would be renamed as Ed & Rae Schollmaier Arena for the project's lead donors. The renovated facility was re-opened on December 20, 2015 when the men's basketball team played Abilene Christian.

== See also ==
- List of NCAA Division I basketball arenas
