= 1944 Texas A&M Aggies football team =

American college football season

1944 Texas A&M Aggies football
- Conference: Southwest Conference
- Record: 7–4 (2–3 SWC)
- Head coach: Homer Norton (11th season)
- Home stadium: Kyle Field

1944 Southwest Conference football standings
	Conf.					Overall
Team	W		L		T	W		L		T
TCU $	3	–	1	–	1	7	–	3	–	1
Texas	3	–	2	–	0	5	–	4	–	0
Arkansas	2	–	2	–	1	5	–	5	–	1
Texas A&M	2	–	3	–	0	7	–	4	–	0
SMU	2	–	3	–	0	5	–	5	–	0
Rice	2	–	3	–	0	5	–	6	–	0
$ – Conference champion

The 1944 Texas A&M Aggies football team represented the Agricultural and Mechanical College of Texas—now known as Texas A&M University—in the Southwest Conference (SWC) during the 1944 college football season. In its 11th season under head coach Homer Norton, the team compiled an overall record of 7–4, with a mark of 2–3 in conference play, and finished tied for fourth in the SWC.

== Schedule ==
Date	Opponent	Site	Result	Attendance	Source
September 23	Bryan AAF*	Kyle Field; College Station, TX	W 39–0		
September 30	vs. Texas Tech*	Alamo Stadium; San Antonio, TX (rivalry)	W 27–14		
October 7	vs. Oklahoma*	Taft Stadium; Oklahoma City, OK	L 14–21	16,000	
October 14	at LSU*	Tiger Stadium; Baton Rouge, LA (rivalry)	W 7–0	25,000	
October 21	TCU	Kyle Field; College Station, TX (rivalry)	L 7–13		
October 28	North Texas Aggies*	Kyle Field; College Station, TX	W 61–0		
November 4	Arkansas	Kyle Field; College Station, TX (rivalry)	L 6–7		
November 11	at SMU	Ownby Stadium; University Park, TX	W 39–6	17,000	
November 18	at Rice	Rice Field; Houston, TX	W 19–6	20,000	
November 30	at Texas	War Memorial Stadium; Austin, TX (rivalry)	L 0–6	43,000	
December 8	at Miami (FL)*	Burdine Stadium; Miami, FL	W 70–14	10,000	
*Non-conference game
