= 1945 Sun Bowl =

American college football game

- Game program
UNAM Pumas	Southwestern Pirates
(4–0–1)	(6–5)
Liga Mayor	Texas Conference
0	35
Head coach: Bernard A. Hoban	Head coach: Randolph M. Medley
	1	2	3	4	Total
UNAM	0	0	0	0	0
Southwestern	7	7	14	7	35
- Date: January 1, 1945
- Season: 1944
- Stadium: Kidd Field
- Location: El Paso, Texas
- Attendance: 13,000
- Payout: US$6,511

The 1945 Sun Bowl was a postseason college football bowl game held at Kidd Field in El Paso, Texas, on January 1, 1945, with approximately 13,000 spectators in attendance. The game featured the Southwestern Pirates representing Southwestern University and the UNAM Pumas representing the National Autonomous University of Mexico (UNAM). This game was the first time an American football bowl game has included a team from Mexico. The next time an American Division I college would play a Mexican opponent was the 2011 Kilimanjaro Bowl.

UNAM entered the game with a 4–0–1 record and had outscored its opponents 182–24. Southwestern was considered a "slight" favorite over the Mexican team. One reason given was that the game played at El Paso was 6,000 feet lower in elevation to what the Mexicans were accustomed.

Southwestern won with a score of 35 points to 0, becoming the first team to win back-to-back Sun Bowl championships. Southwestern set a record for the most penalty yards gained (109 yards) while UNAM set records for the fewest passing yards, fewest offensive plays, fewest offensive yards, lowest offensive average per play, fewest first downs, and fewest first down passes. Southwestern also set the record for most points scored in the Sun Bowl up to that point.
