= TCU Horned Frogs =

Intercollegiate sports teams of Texas Christian University

- University: Texas Christian University
- Nickname: Horned Frogs
- NCAA: Division I (FBS)
- Conference: Big 12 (primary); PRC (rifle)
- Athletic director: Mike Buddie
- Location: Fort Worth, Texas
- Varsity teams: 21
- Football stadium: Amon G. Carter Stadium
- Basketball arena: Schollmaier Arena
- Baseball stadium: Lupton Stadium
- Colors: Purple and white
- Mascot: Super Frog
- Fight song: TCU Fight
- Website: gofrogs.com

The TCU Horned Frogs are the athletic teams that represent Texas Christian University. The 18 varsity teams participate in NCAA Division I and in the Football Bowl Subdivision (FBS) for football, competing mostly in the Big 12 Conference. The school was a founding member of the Southwest Conference and was a member of the Western Athletic Conference, Conference USA (CUSA), and the Mountain West Conference before joining the Big 12. One TCU team participates outside the Big 12 in a sport not sponsored by that conference. The rifle team competes in the Patriot Rifle Conference. The beach volleyball team formerly played in CUSA and the Coastal Collegiate Sports Association prior to the Big 12 sponsoring beach volleyball in 2024-25.

The "horned frog" nickname and mascot refer to the Texas horned lizard, also known as the "horned frog".

== History ==
Texas Christian University began its athletic life as an independent program with a six-year (1914–1920) stint in the Texas Intercollegiate Athletic Association before eventually joining its longtime home, the Southwest Conference (SWC), in 1923. TCU remained a member of the SWC until it disbanded after the 1995–96 academic year when the University of Texas, Texas A&M University, Texas Tech University and Baylor University defected from the conference to form the Big 12 Conference together with the members of the Big Eight Conference; the University of Arkansas had previously left for the Southeastern Conference in 1990, in the aftermath of the Southern Methodist University football scandal, leaving the SWC with no presence outside of the state of Texas. The Horned Frogs, without a conference to call home after 72 years, joined the Western Athletic Conference (WAC), along with SMU and Rice. TCU called the WAC home from 1996 through 2000. In 2001, TCU joined Conference USA (CUSA) and remained there through 2004. TCU joined the Mountain West Conference (MWC) in 2005. In 2010, TCU accepted an invitation to join the Big East Conference in all sports starting in 2012; however, on October 10, 2011, TCU announced that it had reversed its decision and would be joining the Big 12 (headquartered in another Metroplex city, Irving) in 2012 instead, a move that went into effect July 1.

== Sponsored sports ==
Texas Christian University sponsors teams in nine men's and twelve women's NCAA sanctioned sports.

Big 12 Conference logo in TCU's colors

Men's sports	Women's sports
Baseball	Basketball
Basketball	Beach volleyball
Cross country	Cross country
Football	Equestrian
Golf	Golf
Swimming & diving	Rifle
Tennis	Soccer
Track and field^{†}	Swimming & diving
	Tennis
	Track and field^{†}
	Volleyball
† – Track and field includes both indoor and outdoor

=== Football ===
The return of national prominence of TCU football began under the watch of Dennis Franchione when TCU defeated the Trojans of USC in the 1998 Sun Bowl. From 1939, the year after TCU's last national championship, to 1997, TCU's record was 314–383–24. In those 67 years, TCU won 6 Southwest Conference titles and attended 11 bowl games winning only one of those games. Since the 1998 season, TCU has won 7 conference titles, two in the Western Athletic Conference (1999 & 2000), one in Conference USA (2002), three in the Mountain West Conference (2005, 2009, and 2010) and the Big 12 Conference 2014 Co-Championship (with Baylor University). Since 1998, TCU has amassed a record of 79–30. In four of the last five years, the Horned Frogs have won at least 10 games in a season, and won 11 games in three of the last four. During this period TCU has won games against Louisville, Oklahoma, Texas Tech, Utah and BYU. From 1998 to 2006, TCU has attended 8 bowl games, winning five of them. The record of TCU in bowl games as of 2006 is 9–13–1. TCU also claims two national championships from 1935 and 1938.

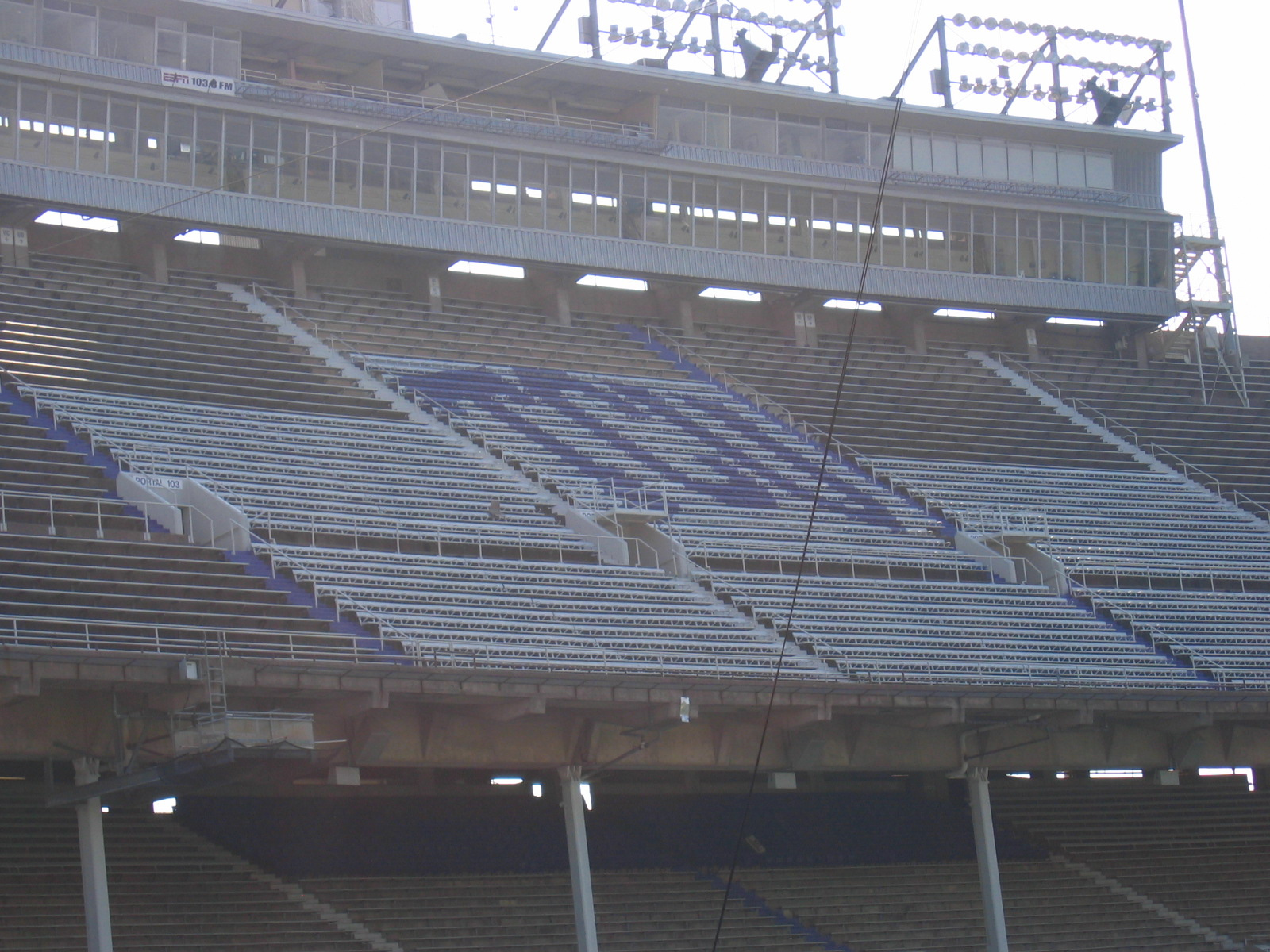
Upper Deck of Amon G. Carter Stadium prior to 2010 demolition

TCU has 41 1st team All-Americans, listed at TCU Horned Frogs football. The school's most famous past players include Rags Matthews, Sammy Baugh, Davey O'Brien (a Heisman Trophy winner, and namesake of the Davey O'Brien National Quarterback Award), Johnny Vaught (later one of the most celebrated coaches of the University of Mississippi), Ki Aldrich, Darrell Lester, Jim Swink, Sonny Gibbs, Norm Bulaich, Bob Lilly, Kenneth Davis, 2006–07 NFL MVP LaDainian Tomlinson and two-time consensus All-American Jerry Gaither. TCU have achieved success under numerous coaches including Matty Bell, Dutch Meyer, Abe Martin, Dennis Franchione, and their longest-serving coach Gary Patterson. Gary Patterson received nine National Coach of the Year honors in 2009. Coaches Matthews, Baugh, O'Brien, Aldrich, Lester, Swink, Lilly, and Dutch Meyer are all members of the College Football Hall of Fame. Baugh and Lilly are also members of the Pro Football Hall of Fame.

The TCU Football team plays its games in Amon G. Carter Stadium. The stadium opened in 1930 and has a capacity of 44,008. On December 5, 2010, the west wing of the Amon G. Carter Stadium was imploded in order accommodate 24 suites, including six Founder's suites on the lower level, and 2,300 club seats on the West side. Total cost of the renovation of Amon G. Carter Stadium is $105 million.

=== Baseball ===
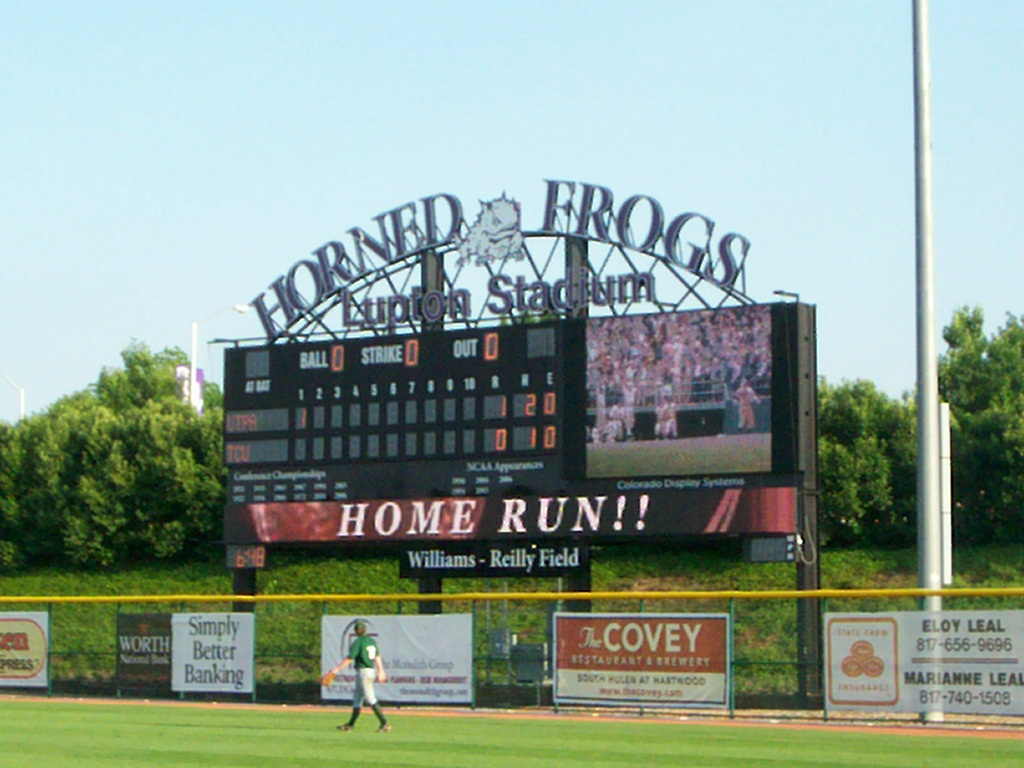
The Lupton Stadium scoreboard in use during a game.

TCU has fielded a baseball team since 1896, before the school found its home in Fort Worth, Texas. The Horned Frog baseball team began playing baseball in the Southwest Conference when it became a member of the conference in 1923. That year they finished the year with a 13–11 overall record and a 2–10 conference record. In 1933 Dutch Meyer, also the coach of the football team, led TCU to its first SWC title with a 9–1 record. During the rest of their time in the SWC, the Frogs would win 6 more regular-season SWC baseball titles. Their next conference championship would come while members of Conference USA in 2004 and 2005. 2006 saw the Horned Frogs in a new conference, the Mountain West Conference. The Frogs went 17–5 in their first year in the MWC and never left first place. They also only had to play 3 games in the conference tournament to win the MWC Tournament Title to complement the regular season title.

TCU has made 14 appearances in the NCAA baseball tournament: 1956, 1994, 2004, 2005, 2006, 2007, 2008, 2009, 2010, 2011, 2012, 2014, 2015, and 2016. TCU has 23 All-Americans, six Freshman All-Americans, three players of the year awards, two pitchers of the year, and numerous All-Conference selections. The TCU Baseball Team makes its home in Lupton Stadium, with a capacity of 3,500.

=== Men's basketball ===
TCU has played since the 1908–1909 season. That first year they entered the Waco City League and left with a record of 2–3, losing to the Baylor teams and defeating the Waco High teams.

The Horned Frogs played basketball in the Southwest Conference from the 1923–24 seasons until the breakup of the conference after the 1995–96 season. During their time in the SWC they won 10 conference titles (1931, 1934, 1951*, 1952, 1953, 1959, 1968, 1971, 1986*, 1987; * denotes shared title). Buster Brannon owns the most wins as a coach in TCU Men's Basketball history with a career that spanned 20 years he earned a record of 205–259, a 104–144 record in SWC play, won 4 conference titles and earned three trips to the NCAA basketball tournament in 1952, 1953 and 1959. The TCU Men's Basketball Team would only win one more conference championship after the breakup of the Southwest Conference. During the 1997–98 season under Coach Billy Tubbs, the team went 27–6 and 14–0 in WAC play. The team earned a trip to the Midwest Regional played in Oklahoma City, OK. They would lose in the first round to Florida State. TCU never won a title during their time in Conference USA or the Mountain West Conference.

TCU's other NCAA tournament appearances occurred in 1968, 1971 and 1987, 2017, and 2022.

Along with NCAA Tournament appearances, TCU appeared in the National Invitational Tournament six times – 1983, 1986, 1992, 1997, 1999 and 2005. They advanced to the quarterfinal round three times – 1983, 1999 and 2005, and they won the NIT championship in 2017.

The TCU Men's Basketball Team was coached from 2002 to 2007 by Neil Dougherty. He was fired in March 2008, after TCU limped through yet another season with a losing record. Jim Christian, previously with Kent State University, was hired shortly after Dougherty was fired. Christian resigned on April 2, 2012, to accept the head coaching position at Ohio University. He was replaced by Trent Johnson, who guided TCU into the Big 12. From 2012 to 2016, Johnson's teams posted a 50–79 record, including an 8–64 mark in Big 12 play, and never finished better than ninth in the ten-team league. Johnson was fired in 2016 and replaced by Jamie Dixon, a former TCU player who had served as head coach at Pittsburgh prior to returning to Fort Worth.

As of the end of the 2021–22 season, Dixon has led TCU to a 117–84 record, a 42–64 mark in Big 12 play, an NIT championship in 2017, and two appearances in the NCAA tournament. The 2021–22 season was the Frogs' best season yet, as they finished tied for fifth in the Big 12, reached the semifinals of the 2022 Big 12 men's basketball tournament, and won an NCAA tournament game for the first time since 1987.

The TCU Men's Basketball Team plays their home games in Schollmaier Arena, formerly known as the Daniel–Meyer Coliseum, on the campus of TCU.

Kurt Thomas, considered by some as the best athlete to attend TCU, played for the basketball team from 1990 to 1995. He was a three time All-American and averaged 29 points and 15 rebounds his senior year.

=== Women's basketball ===
The Horned Frogs fielded their first women's basketball team in the 1977–78 season and recorded a 5–18 record. They improved significantly the following year, going 19–8. Current coach Raegan Pebley has been the coach of the team since the 2014–15 season. During the 2000–01 season, the Horned Frogs won their first regular season and conference championship at the WAC Tournament. The program matched that accomplishment the next season, their first season in Conference USA during the 2001–2002 season. They then proceeded to win the C-USA tournament in 2002–03 and 2004–05. Of the four years the Horned Frogs were in C-USA, they won the conference title four out of five years.

TCU has also reached the Women's NCAA tournament for six consecutive years, stretching back to the 2000–01 season. Each year, they have won their first game of the tournament and lost the second game, except for first-round losses to Oregon in 2005 and to South Dakota State in 2009. TCU women's basketball has reached the post season 11 out of 12 years that Coach Jeff Mittie has been head of the program.

The Horned Frogs share Schollmaier Arena with the men's team, playing under the roof there for the entire history of the program.

Until the 2010–11 athletics' season, the women's athletic teams went by "Lady Frogs".

=== Women's volleyball ===
The TCU Women's Volleyball Team is coached by Prentice Lewis with the help of associate head coach Jason Tanaka who both joined the team in February 2002. Since Lewis' arrival, the volleyball team has had the third best record to date at 12–18. The next year, 2003, the Horned Frogs recorded their best record to date at 20–11 and made it to the second round of the C-USA tournament, a first for a TCU Volleyball team. 2005 the Horned Frog Volleyball team saw their first year in the Mountain West Conference. The team finished the season 16–18 and were seeded 8th in the conference tournament. They defeated the number 9 seed, Air Force, in the play-in match 3–1. The Frogs then fell to the top seeded BYU 3–0 in the quarterfinals round. 2006 the Frogs recorded a 17–15 record and were the sixth seed in the MWC tournament. They eventually lost to Colorado State University 3–1. The 2006 season marked the Horned Frogs third winning season in four years.

The team plays their home games at Shollmaier Arena on the TCU campus.

=== Men's and women's cross country ===
The Men's and Women's TCU Harriers Cross Country teams compete in the Big 12 Conference. For purposes of qualifying for the NCAA Men's and Women's Cross Country Championships, the TCU Harriers compete in the South Central Regional while the rest of the conference competes in the Rocky Mountain Regional. From 2003 to 2005 the TCU Harriers sent a runner to the NCAA Men's or Women's Cross Country Championships. The TCU Harriers Cross Country team is coached by Eric Heins.

=== Women's equestrian ===
In December 2005 it was announced that starting in the 2006–2007 academic year women's equestrian would become a varsity sport sponsored by TCU. The NCAA designated equestrian as an emerging sport in 1998, and, in 2013, there were 37 intercollegiate programs recognized for NCAA competition. Programs in the region include Baylor, Kansas State, Oklahoma State, SMU, Stephen F. Austin, Texas A&M, and West Texas A&M. Intercollegiate equestrian programs support an average of 70 student-athletes.

=== Golf ===
==== Men's golf ====
The TCU Men's Golf team is led by 20-year Head Coach Bill Montigel. During his tenure, Coach Montigel has guided the men's golf team to five consecutive conference titles from 2001 to 2005 between the Horned Frogs time in the WAC and MWC. Since 1990, the Horned Frogs have qualified as a team to the NCAA South Central Regional every year. In ten of those years, the team moved on to the NCAA Championships. Among the most notable TCU men's golf alumni are J. J. Henry and Tom Hoge who was a member of the United States team during the 2006 Ryder Cup. The TCU golf team practices at the Colonial Golf & Country Club. They have won nine conference titles: SWC (1986), WAC (1997, 1998, 2001) C-USA (2002, 2003, 2004, 2005), and MWC (2009).

==== Women's golf ====
In 1983, the TCU Women's Golf team accounted for the school's lone national championship outside of football. Currently the women's golf team is led by Head Coach Angie Ravaioli-Larkin. The Horned Frogs have at least four former players now playing professionally. The most notable is multiple LPGA Tour-winner Angela Stanford. TCU practices at the Colonial Country Club.

=== Women's rifle ===
The Women's Rifle team has had a number of firsts in the history of TCU athletics. In 1972, Sue Ann Sandusky was recorded as Texas Christian University's first All-American. Also, In 2010, the team became the first all-female squad to win a national championship. They would win the national championship again in 2012, 2019, and 2024. The TCU Women's Rifle team is currently led by head coach Karen Monez, who has been a part of the program since 2003.

In June 2013, the Horned Frogs became a charter member of the Patriot Rifle Conference.

All-Americans

Player	Event	Year(s)
Sue Ann Sandusky	Smallbore	1972, 1973, 1974
G. David Tubb	Smallbore	1976, 1977, 1978
Allen W. Cunniff	Smallbore	1976, 1977
William H. Kovaric	Smallbore	1976, 1977
Robert A. Hayes	Smallbore	1977
Wendy S. Warner	Air Rifle	1980
Barbara Mann	Air Rifle	1980, 1981, 1982
Celeste Green	Smallbore	2003

=== Women's soccer ===
In 1986, the TCU Women's Soccer team played its first season in Fort Worth, Texas. After three decades of mediocrity, the Horned Frogs made their first NCAA tournament appearance in 2016, and has since qualified for the tournament every year except 2023. In 2025, they made the College Cup for the first time in school history. TCU has played in the Big 12 Conference since the 2012 season, winning the conference regular season championship in 2020, 2021, 2024 and 2025, and the conference tournament in 2021.

Since joining the Big 12 Conference in 2012, TCU has been coached by Eric Bell, the winningest head coach in program history. His record with the team is 167-84-43, and has coached the team to all four conference championships and all nine NCAA tournament appearances in program history, including seven straight between 2016 and 2022. From 2016 to 2024, Bell coached the team to nine straight seasons of double-digit wins. Prior to coaching at TCU, Bell was an assistant coach and associate head coach at Florida State, helping the Seminoles reach the College Cup three times, including a championship game appearance.

In 2007, the TCU Women's Soccer team received an award for being one of the best academic sports teams in the nation. For the second-consecutive year the women's soccer program was recognized by the National Soccer Coaches Association of America with the NSCAA Team Academic Award. The Horned Frogs also placed 14 individuals on the Fall Academic All-Mountain West Conference Team.

The Horned Frogs play their home matches at Garvey-Rosenthal Stadium, which seats 1,500. The single-game attendance record is 3,648, set on September 5, 2022.

In August 2010, the Jane Justin Field House was added to the complex. It contains a locker room for the TCU women's soccer team, its visitors, and officials. There are also coaches' meeting rooms and an athletic training room. The field house was named honoring Jane C. Justine, who graduated from TCU in 1943. The facility's field house was a $1.5 million gift from the John and Jane Justin Foundation. This is the largest gift solely provided for woman's athletics at Texas Christian University to date.

The team's all-time record is 357–335–72.

All-Conference Players

Award	Player
1995 SWC All-Conference	Angela Garrett
1996 WAC All-Conference	Sarah Suess
1998 WAC All-Conference	Allison Calleri
1998 WAC All-Conference	Jill Cook
1999 WAC All-Conference	Brenda DeRose
1999 WAC All-Conference	Jennifer Maunder
2000 WAC All-Conference	Brenda DeRose
2000 WAC All-Conference	Sherry Dick

=== Men's and women's swimming and diving ===
Recently taken over by Head Coach James Winchester in April 2018, the Texas Christian University swimming and diving program officially formed in 1979. Richard Sybesma was the first head coach for TCU swimming and diving and remained so for thirty-eight years. Although there was an actual swim team before 1979, but the team did not keep records, therefore we know little about the team.

The TCU swimming and diving program has won over 400 dual meets including championship meets. The TCU swimming and diving team has been in three different conferences since its beginning. First was the Southwest conference from 1979 to 1993, then moved to the Western Atlantic Conference (WAC) in 1994–2000, in 2001 they proceeded to Conference USA, and finally from 2005–present the TCU swim team has been in the Mountain West Conference (MWC).

While in the Conference USA conference the men's swimming and diving team dominated the pools across the country. They were the Conference USA champions in 2002, 2003, 2004, and 2005. The women's team also had much success in the Conference USA. In 2002 and 2004 TCU swimming and diving swept Conference USA by winning both on the men and women's side. The TCU swimming and diving team had yet to achieve such awards until 2010 when the men's team won the Mountain West Conference dual meet Championship.

The College Coaches Association has honored the TCU women's program as an Academic All-American swim team for over thirty-five consecutive semesters while the men's program has been honored on over thirteen occasions. This program, along with all the athletic programs at Texas Christian University have been in many different conferences including the Western Atlantic Conference, Conference USA, Mountain West Conference. Starting in 2012 the Horned Frogs joined the Big 12 Conference.

All home meets are located in the Student Recreation Center on the campus of TCU.

Men and women swimming All-Americans

The TCU Horned Frog Swimming and Diving have produced fourteen All-Americans within the AIAW and NCAA. Between these swimmers are twelve women and two men.

Year	Name	Source
1980	Kathy Todd	AIAW
1981	Karen Andrews	AIAW
1981	Linda Wadsworth	AIAW
1981–82	Becky Brill	AIAW
1981–82	Dea Fredrick	AIAW
1981–82	Kim Healy	AIAW
1981–82	Catherine MacLane	AIAW
1981–82	Susan Seppanen	AIAW
1981–82	Dianna Stiles	AIAW
1982	Mary Bridge	AIAW
1982	Laura Crouch	AIAW
1992	Kelly Crowell	NCAA
1994	Walter Soza	NCAA
1997	Jason Flint	NCAA

=== Men's & women's track and field ===
==== Indoor track ====
Individual championships

Year	Name	Event	Time
1989	Raymond Stewart	55m Dash	6.07
2000	R. Williams	4 × 400 m Relay	3:06.69
2000	A. Amantine	4 × 400 m Relay	3:06.69
2000	K. Campbell	4 × 400 m Relay	3:06.69
2000	J. Collins	4 × 400 m Relay	3:06.69
2001	Kim Collins	60m Dash	6.58
2001	Kim Collins	200m Dash	20.55
2006	Jackson Langat	800m Dash	1:47.02
2015	Ronnie Baker	60m Dash	6.52
2016	Ronnie Baker	60m Dash	6.47

==== Outdoor championships ====
Individual champions

Year	Name	Event	Time
1983	A. Ingraham	4 × 400 m Relay	3:02.09
1983	J. Richard	4 × 400 m Relay	3:02.09
1983	K. Burnett	4 × 400 m Relay	3:02.09
1983	D. Walker	4 × 400 m Relay	3:02.09
1986	R. Tatum	4 × 100 m Relay	38.46^{**}
1986	A. Smith	4 × 100 m Relay	38.46^{**}
1986	L. Reid	4 × 100 m Relay	38.46^{**}
1986	G. Sholars	4 × 100 m Relay	38.46^{**}
1987	R. Tatum	4 × 100 m Relay	38.82
1987	A. Smith	4 × 100 m Relay	38.82
1987	G. Sholars	4 × 100 m Relay	38.82
1987	R. Stewart	4 × 100 m Relay	38.82
1987	Raymond Stewart	100m Dash	10.14
1989	R. Tatum	4 × 100 m Relay	38.23^{**}
1989	A. Smith	4 × 100 m Relay	38.23^{**}
1989	G. Sholars	4 × 100 m Relay	38.23^{**}
1989	R. Stewart	4 × 100 m Relay	38.23^{**}
1989	Raymond Stewart	100m Dash	9.97
1991	J. Drummond	4 × 100 m Relay	38.88
1991	C. Johnson	4 × 100 m Relay	38.88
1991	R. Wright	4 × 100 m Relay	38.88
1991	H. Porter	4 × 100 m Relay	38.88
1995	D. Powell	4 × 100 m Relay	38.63
1995	B. Carter	4 × 100 m Relay	38.63
1995	L. Edwards	4 × 100 m Relay	38.63
1995	H. Abdallah	4 × 100 m Relay	38.63
1998	Khadevis Robinson	800m Run	1:46.04

^{**}collegiate record; NCAA meet record

=== Tennis ===
The TCU Tennis teams play their home matches at the Bayard H. Friedman Tennis Center, rated the #1 facility in the nation by Tennis Magazine.

==== Men's tennis ====
The TCU Men's Tennis team was coached by Dave Borelli. Before he became coach of the men's team, Borelli coached the TCU Women's Tennis team four years before. They are the 2005–2006 Mountain West Conference Tournament Champions. Currently, the Horned Grogs are coached by David Roditi, who led the program to its first national championship in 2024, beating Texas 4–3 in the championship match.

==== Women's tennis ====
The TCU Women's Tennis team was coached by Jefferson Hammond. They are the 2005–2006 Mountain West Conference regular season and tournament champions. Lee Walker is the current head coach of TCU Women's tennis who are ranked #22 for this upcoming season.

== Notable non-varsity sports ==
=== Rugby ===
The Texas Christian University Rugby Football Club plays in Division 1 of college rugby in the Southwest conference against other in-state rivals. TCU rugby plays its home games at the TCU Rugby Pitch, located at 3400 W. Berry St. TCU rugby has been led since 2008 by head coach Ben Cole, a USA Rugby certified coach.

== Traditions ==
=== Horned Frog Mascot ===
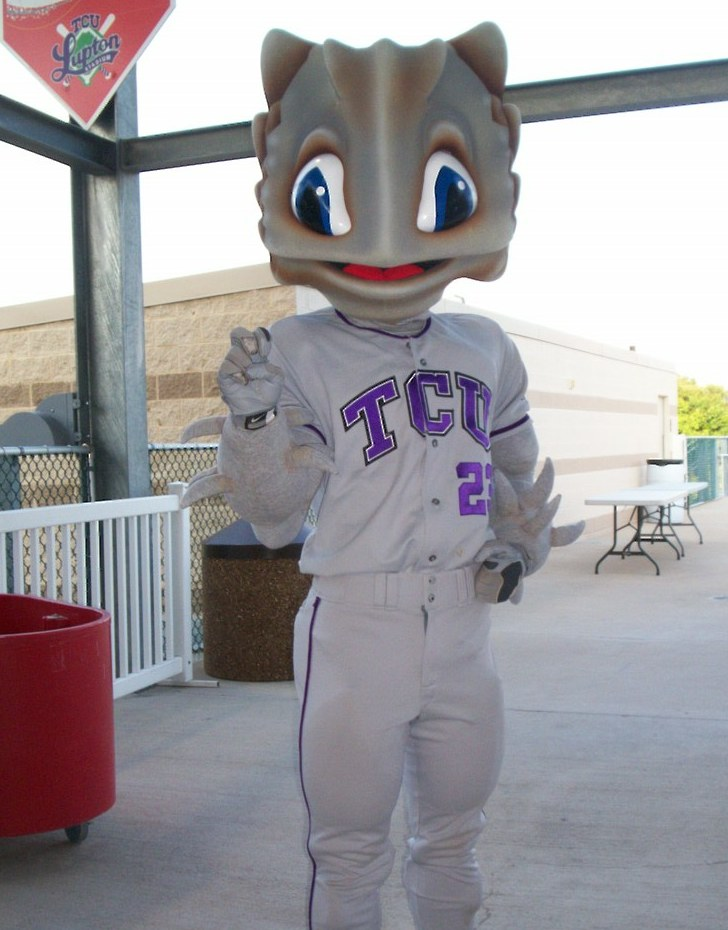
Super Frog at a Baseball game.

The Horned Frog first appeared in 1897 on the cover of the first AddRan yearbook. By 1915, the mascot made its way onto the first TCU seal. During the post-WWII years, the Horned Frog Mascot was embraced in costume, on stationery, class rings and the band's bass drums. In 1979 the mascot was renamed from Addy the All-American Frog to Super Frog.

TCU has capitalized on its mascot by marketing a bumper sticker (in a role reversal of where a frog, once kissed, turns into a prince) stating "My Princess Turned into a Frog".

=== Team colors ===
TCU's official colors are purple and white. Since the 1990s, the Horned Frogs have gradually incorporated black as a color and it now features prominently as a tertiary color with most uniforms having black trim and TCU teams occasionally wearing black alternate uniforms. The Horned Frogs will also occasionally wear red as an accent color, a reference to horned lizards shooting blood from their eye sockets as a defense mechanism.

=== Music ===
==== Fight song ====
The TCU fight song "TCU March" was written for the marching band by Claude Sammis in 1928.

==== Cheers ====
TCU's most notable cheer is Riff Ram Bah Zoo.

== Championships ==
=== NCAA team championships ===
TCU has won 7 NCAA team national championships.

- Men's (1)
  - Tennis (1): 2024
- Women's (2)
  - Beach volleyball (1): 2025
  - Golf (1): 1983
- Co-ed (4)
  - Rifle (4): 2010, 2012, 2019, 2024
- see also:
  - Big 12 Conference national team titles
  - List of NCAA schools with the most NCAA Division I championships

=== Other national team championships ===
TCU claims 5 additional team titles not bestowed by the NCAA:

- Men's (4)
  - Football (2): 1935, 1938
  - Indoor Tennis (2): 2022, 2023
- Women's (1)
  - Equestrian (1): 2008
- see also:
  - List of NCAA schools with the most Division I national championships

=== Championship coaches ===
Year	Sport	Coach
1935	Football^{1}	Dutch Meyer
1938	Football	Dutch Meyer
1983	Women's Golf	Fred Warren
2008	Women's Equestrian	Gary Reynolds
2010	Rifle ^{2}	Karen Monez
2012	Rifle	Karen Monez
2019	Rifle	Karen Monez
2022	Men's Tennis (indoor)	David Roditi
2023	Men's Tennis (indoor)	David Roditi
2024	Rifle	Karen Monez
2024	Men's Tennis (outdoor)	David Roditi
2025	Beach Volleyball	Hector Gutierrez

^{1} – Named Co-National Champion by the Williamson System along with LSU. SMU was named National Champion by the Dickinson System which was favored at the time. Princeton and Minnesota also claim a national championship from this season by other poll systems active at the time.

^{2} – Although the NCAA Rifle Sport is coed, the TCU Rifle National Championship Team was made up of only females, marking the first time an all-women team has won the national title.

=== Conference championships ===
TCU has won 148 conference championships: 28 in the Big 12, 34 in the Mountain West, 18 in Conference USA, 15 in the WAC, 40 in the Southwest Conference, 1 in the TIAA, 7 in the Patriot Rifle Conference, and 1 in the CCSA.

Football (18)

- 1920, 1929, 1932, 1938, 1944, 1951, 1955, 1958, 1959, 1994, 1999, 2000, 2002, 2005, 2009, 2010, 2011, 2014

Baseball (30)

- Regular season (20): 1933, 1956, 1963, 1966, 1967, 1972, 1994, 2004, 2005, 2006, 2007, 2008, 2009, 2010, 2011, 2012, 2015, 2017, 2021, 2022
- Conference tournament (10): 2004, 2005, 2006, 2007, 2008, 2010, 2014, 2016, 2021, 2023

Men's basketball (11)

- Regular season: 1931, 1934, 1951, 1952, 1953, 1959, 1968, 1971, 1986, 1987, 1998

Women's basketball (9)

- Regular season (5): 2001, 2002, 2010, 2025, 2026
- Conference tournament (4): 2001, 2003, 2005, 2025

Men's golf (9)

- 1986, 1997, 1998, 2001, 2002, 2003, 2004, 2005, 2009

Women's golf (5)

- 1983, 1998, 2002, 2007, 2011

Rifle (7)

- 2016, 2017, 2018, 2020, 2021, 2023, 2024

Soccer (4)

- Regular season (4): 2020, 2021, 2024, 2025
- Conference tournament (1): 2021

Men's tennis (29)

- Regular season (13): 1989, 1991, 1992, 1994, 1996, 2008, 2009, 2016, 2017, 2018, 2021, 2022, 2025
- Conference tournament (17): 1988, 1989, 1991, 1992, 1994, 1995, 1996, 1997, 2000, 2001, 2006, 2008, 2010, 2016, 2017, 2023, 2026

Women's tennis (17)

- Regular season (10): 1991, 2000, 2001, 2002, 2006, 2007, 2008, 2009, 2010, 2012
- Conference tournament (8): 2000, 2001, 2002, 2006, 2009, 2010, 2012, 2026

Beach volleyball (6)

- Regular season (3): 2022, 2023, 2024
- Conference tournament (3): 2023, 2024, 2025
