= 1944 Rice Owls football team =

American college football season

1944 Rice Owls football
- Conference: Southwest Conference
- Record: 5–6 (2–3 SWC)
- Head coach: Jess Neely (5th season)
- Home stadium: Rice Field

1944 Southwest Conference football standings
| | Conf. | | | | | Overall |
| Team | W | | L | | T | W | | L | | T |
|---|---|---|---|---|---|---|---|---|---|---|
| TCU $ | 3 | – | 1 | – | 1 | 7 | – | 3 | – | 1 |
| Texas | 3 | – | 2 | – | 0 | 5 | – | 4 | – | 0 |
| Arkansas | 2 | – | 2 | – | 1 | 5 | – | 5 | – | 1 |
| Texas A&M | 2 | – | 3 | – | 0 | 7 | – | 4 | – | 0 |
| SMU | 2 | – | 3 | – | 0 | 5 | – | 5 | – | 0 |
| Rice | 2 | – | 3 | – | 0 | 5 | – | 6 | – | 0 |
$ – Conference champion

The 1944 Rice Owls football team was an American football team that represented Rice Institute as a member of the Southwest Conference (SWC) during the 1944 college football season. In its fifth season under head coach Jess Neely, the team compiled a 5–6 record (2–3 against SWC opponents) and was outscored by a total of 163 to 143.

== Schedule ==
| Date | Opponent | Site | Result | Attendance | Source |
|---|---|---|---|---|---|
| September 23 | Galveston AAF* | Rice Field; Houston, TX | W 57–0 | 12,000 | |
| September 30 | Randolph Field* | Rice Field; Houston, TX | L 0–59 | 20,000 | |
| October 7 | LSU* | Rice Field; Houston, TX | W 14–13 | 10,000 | |
| October 14 | at Tulane* | Tulane Stadium; New Orleans, LA | L 0–21 | 28,000 | |
| October 21 | SMU | Rice Field; Houston, TX | W 21–10 | | |
| October 28 | Texas | Rice Field; Houston, TX | W 7–0 | 25,000 | |
| November 4 | Texas Tech* | Rice Field; Houston, TX | L 7–13 | 10,000 | |
| November 11 | at Arkansas | Razorback Stadium; Fayetteville, AR | L 7–12 | 9,000 | |
| November 18 | Texas A&M | Rice Field; Houston, TX | L 6–19 | 20,000 | |
| November 25 | TCU | Rice Field; Houston, TX | L 6–9 | | |
| December 2 | Southwestern (TX)* | Rice Field; Houston, TX | W 18–7 | | |
*Non-conference game
