= 1944 Oklahoma A&M Cowboys football team =

American college football season

1944 Oklahoma A&M Cowboys football

MVC champion Cotton Bowl Classic champion

Cotton Bowl Classic, W 34–0 vs. TCU
- Conference: Missouri Valley Conference
- Record: 8–1 (1–0 MVC)
- Head coach: Jim Lookabaugh (6th season)
- Home stadium: Lewis Field

1944 Missouri Valley Conference football standings
	Conf.					Overall
Team	W		L		T	W		L		T
Oklahoma A&M $	1	–	0	–	0	8	–	1	–	0
Tulsa	0	–	1	–	0	8	–	2	–	0
Drake	0	–	0	–	0	7	–	2	–	0
$ – Conference champion

The 1944 Oklahoma A&M Cowboys football team represented Oklahoma Agricultural and Mechanical College (later renamed Oklahoma State University–Stillwater) in the Missouri Valley Conference during the 1944 college football season. In their sixth year under head coach Jim Lookabaugh, the Cowboys compiled an 8–1 record (1–0 against conference opponents), won the Missouri Valley championship, defeated TCU in the 1945 Cotton Bowl Classic, and outscored all opponents by a combined total of 228 to 103. They played their home games at Lewis Field in Stillwater, Oklahoma.

On offense, the 1944 team averaged 25.3 points, 196.9 rushing yards, and 126.3 passing yards per game. On defense, the team allowed an average of 11.4 points, 182.9 rushing yards and 66.0 passing yards per game.

The team's statistical leaders included halfback Bob Fenimore with 897 rushing yards, 861 passing yards, and 53 points scored, and Cecil Hankins with 474 receiving yards. Fenimore was selected by several selectors (Associated Press, Collier's Weekly, Football News, Football Writers Association of America, and Newspaper Enterprise Association) as a first-team halfback on the 1944 College Football All-America Team. He was later inducted into the College Football Hall of Fame.

== Schedule ==
Date	Opponent	Rank	Site	Result	Attendance	Source
September 23	West Texas State*		Lewis Field; Stillwater, OK	W 41–6		
September 29	vs. Arkansas*		Taft Stadium; Oklahoma City, OK	W 19–0	12,000	
October 7	at Texas Tech*		Tech Field; Lubbock, TX	W 14–7		
October 21	at Denver*		DU Stadium; Denver, CO	W 33–21		
October 28	at No. 7 Tulsa		Skelly Field; Tulsa, OK (rivalry)	W 46–40	12,063	
November 4	Norman NAS*^{†}	No. 19	Lewis Field; Stillwater, OK	L 0–15	7,000	
November 11	at Texas*		War Memorial Stadium; Austin, TX	W 13–8	13,000	
November 25	vs. Oklahoma*		Taft Stadium; Oklahoma City, OK (Bedlam Series)	W 28–6		
January 1, 1945	vs. TCU*		Cotton Bowl; Dallas, TX (Cotton Bowl Classic)	W 34–0	37,500	
*Non-conference game; ^{†}Homecoming; Rankings from AP Poll released prior to the game

== Rankings ==
The AP released their first rankings on October 9. The Cowboys entered the rankings on October 30.

Ranking movements Legend: ██ Increase in ranking ██ Decrease in ranking — = Not ranked т = Tied with team above or below
	Week								
Poll	1	2	3	4	5	6	7	8	Final
AP	—	—	—	19т	—	—	—	15	—

== After the season ==
The 1945 NFL draft was held on April 8, 1945. The following Cowboys were selected.

Round	Pick	Player	Position	NFL team
19	195	Joe Spencer	Tackle	Philadelphia Eagles
19	197	Ed Jeffers	Tackle	Green Bay Packers
20	206	Leo Pratt	Tackle	Philadelphia Eagles
24	250	Blair Brown	Guard	Philadelphia Eagles
28	287	Jim Marsh	Tackle	Pittsburgh Steelers
32	330	Billy Joe Aldridge	Back	Green Bay Packers
