= 1944 Arkansas Razorbacks football team =

American college football season

1944 Arkansas Razorbacks football
- Conference: Southwest Conference
- Record: 5–5–1 (2–2–1 SWC)
- Head coach: Glen Rose (1st season)
- Captains: Lamar Dingler; James Young
- Home stadium: Razorback Stadium

1944 Southwest Conference football standings
	Conf.					Overall
Team	W		L		T	W		L		T
TCU $	3	–	1	–	1	7	–	3	–	1
Texas	3	–	2	–	0	5	–	4	–	0
Arkansas	2	–	2	–	1	5	–	5	–	1
Texas A&M	2	–	3	–	0	7	–	4	–	0
SMU	2	–	3	–	0	5	–	5	–	0
Rice	2	–	3	–	0	5	–	6	–	0
$ – Conference champion

The 1944 Arkansas Razorbacks football team represented the University of Arkansas in the Southwest Conference (SWC) during the 1944 college football season.

In their first year under head coach Glen Rose, the Razorbacks compiled a 5–5–1 record (2–2–1 against SWC opponents), finished in third place in the SWC, and were outscored by their opponents by a combined total of 161 to 120.

== Schedule ==
Date	Opponent	Site	Result	Attendance	Source
September 23	vs. Missouri*	Walsh Stadium; St. Louis, MO (rivalry)	W 7–6	8,500	
September 29	vs. Oklahoma A&M*	Taft Stadium; Oklahoma City, OK	L 0–19	12,000	
October 7	at TCU	Amon G. Carter Stadium; Fort Worth, TX	T 6–6		
October 14	Norman NAS*	Razorback Stadium; Fayetteville, AR	L 7–27		
October 21	Texas	Quigley Stadium; Little Rock, AR (rivalry)	L 0–19	10,000	
October 28	vs. Ole Miss*	Crump Stadium; Memphis, TN (rivalry)	W 26–18	10,000	
November 4	at Texas A&M	Kyle Field; College Station, TX (rivalry)	W 7–6		
November 11	Rice^{†}	Razorback Stadium; Fayetteville, AR	W 12–7	9,000	
November 18	at SMU	Ownby Stadium; University Park, TX	L 12–20		
November 23	at Tulsa*	Skelly Field; Tulsa, OK	L 2–33	16,000	
December 2	Arkansas A&M*	Razorback Stadium; Fayetteville, AR	W 41–0	1,200	
*Non-conference game; ^{†}Homecoming
