= 1944 Tulsa Golden Hurricane football team =

American college football season

1944 Tulsa Golden Hurricane football

Orange Bowl champion

Orange Bowl, W 26–12 vs. Georgia Tech
- Conference: Missouri Valley Conference
- Record: 8–2 (0–1 MVC)
- Head coach: Henry Frnka (4th season)
- Home stadium: Skelly Field

1944 Missouri Valley Conference football standings
	Conf.					Overall
Team	W		L		T	W		L		T
Oklahoma A&M $	1	–	0	–	0	8	–	1	–	0
Tulsa	0	–	1	–	0	8	–	2	–	0
Drake	0	–	0	–	0	7	–	2	–	0
$ – Conference champion

The 1944 Tulsa Golden Hurricane football team represented the University of Tulsa during the 1944 college football season. In their fourth year under head coach Henry Frnka, the Golden Hurricane compiled an 8–2 record (0–1 against Missouri Valley Conference opponents) and defeated Georgia Tech in the 1945 Orange Bowl.

Tulsa was ranked No. 7 in the AP Poll after defeating Texas Tech (34–7) and Ole Miss (47–0), but then lost back-to-back games against Oklahoma State and Iowa Pre-Flight. Later in the season, Tulsa also defeated Arkansas (33–2) and the Miami Hurricanes (48–2).

Center Felto Prewitt was selected as a first-team All-American by Football News, and guard Ellis Jones was selected as a first-team All-American by Look magazine.

== Schedule ==
Date	Time	Opponent	Rank	Site	Result	Attendance	Source
September 23	7:45 p.m.	North Texas Aggies*		Skelly Field; Tulsa, OK	W 47–6	12,000	
October 7		Kansas*		Skelly Field; Tulsa, OK	W 27–0	12,000	
October 14		Texas Tech*	No. 13	Skelly Field; Tulsa, OK	W 34–7	8,500–9,000	
October 21		vs. Ole Miss*	No. 13	Crump Stadium; Memphis, TN	W 47–0	8,000	
October 28		Oklahoma A&M^{†}	No. 7	Skelly Field; Tulsa, OK (rivalry)	L 40–46	12,063	
November 4		No. 7 Iowa Pre-Flight*		Skelly Field; Tulsa, OK	L 27–47	18,000	
November 11		Southwestern (TX)*		Skelly Field; Tulsa, OK	W 51–6	8,000	
November 23		Arkansas*		Skelly Field; Tulsa, OK	W 33–2	16,000	
December 1		at Miami (FL)*		Burdine Stadium; Miami, FL	W 48–2	11,234	
January 1, 1945		vs. No. T–13 Georgia Tech*		Burdine Stadium; Miami, FL (Orange Bowl)	W 26–12	29,426	
*Non-conference game; ^{†}Homecoming; Rankings from AP Poll released prior to the game; All times are in Central time

== Rankings ==
The AP released their first rankings on October 9, the Golden Hurricane were ranked 13th.

Ranking movements Legend: ██ Increase in ranking ██ Decrease in ranking — = Not ranked т = Tied with team above or below
	Week								
Poll	1	2	3	4	5	6	7	8	Final
AP	13	13	7т	—	—	—	—	—	—

== After the season ==
=== 1945 NFL draft ===
The following Golden Hurricane players were selected in the 1945 NFL draft following the season.

Round	Pick	Player	Position	NFL club
3	27	Clyde Goodnight	End	Green Bay Packers
5	34	Al Kowalski	Back	Brooklyn Tigers
7	60	Glen Burgeis	Tackle	Chicago Bears
8	69	Ellis Jones	Guard	Boston Yanks
8	76	Toby Collins	Tackle	Green Bay Packers
19	194	Clyde LeForce	Quarterback	Detroit Lions
25	263	Nolan Luhn	End	Green Bay Packers
27	280	Dell Taylor	Back	Detroit Lions
