= 1944 Texas Tech Red Raiders football team =

American college football season

1944 Texas Tech Red Raiders football
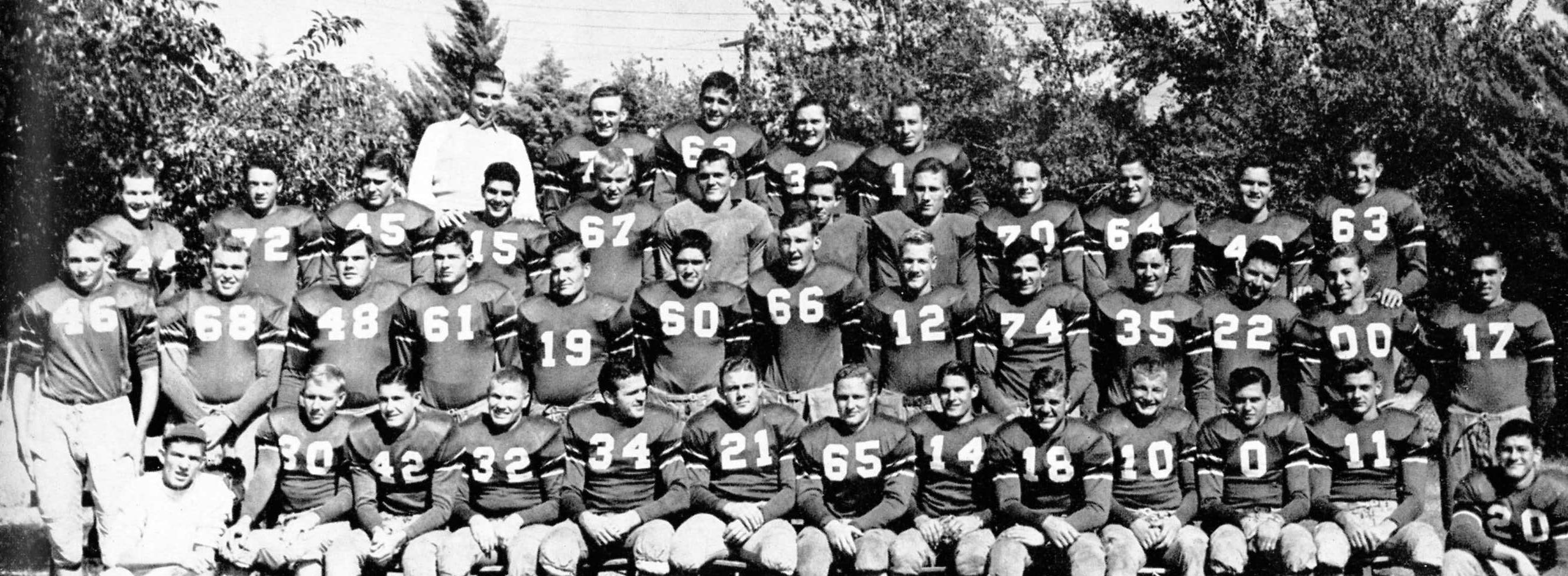
- Conference: Border Conference
- Record: 4–7 (2–0 Border)
- Head coach: Dell Morgan (4th season)
- Offensive scheme: Single-wing
- Base defense: 6–2
- Home stadium: Tech Field

1944 Border Conference football standings
| | Conf. | | | | | Overall |
| Team | W | | L | | T | W | | L | | T |
|---|---|---|---|---|---|---|---|---|---|---|
| Texas Tech | 2 | – | 0 | – | 0 | 4 | – | 7 | – | 0 |
| West Texas State | 1 | – | 1 | – | 0 | 4 | – | 3 | – | 0 |
| New Mexico | 0 | – | 2 | – | 0 | 1 | – | 7 | – | 0 |
| Arizona State–Flagstaff | 0 | – | 0 | – | 0 | 2 | – | 2 | – | 0 |
$ – Conference champion

The 1944 Texas Tech Red Raiders football team represented Texas Technological College—now known as Texas Tech University—as a member of the Border Conference during the 1944 college football season. Led by fourth-year head coach Dell Morgan, the Red Raiders compiled an overall record of 4–7 with a mark of 2–0 in conference play. No Border Conference title was awarded. The team played home games at Tech Field in Lubbock, Texas.

== Schedule ==
| Date | Time | Opponent | Site | Result | Attendance | Source |
|---|---|---|---|---|---|---|
| September 23 | 8:00 p.m. | Lubbock AAF* | Tech Field; Lubbock, TX | L 13–27 | | |
| September 30 | | vs. Texas A&M* | Alamo Stadium; San Antonio, TX (rivalry) | L 14–27 | | |
| October 7 | | Oklahoma A&M* | Tech Field; Lubbock, TX | L 7–14 | | |
| October 14 | | at No. 13 Tulsa* | Skelly Field; Tulsa, OK | L 7–34 | 8,500–9,000 | |
| October 21 | | Southwestern (TX)* | Tech Field; Lubbock, TX | L 19–21 | | |
| October 27 | | vs. West Texas State | Butler Field; Amarillo, TX | W 35–6 | | |
| November 4 | | at Rice* | Rice Field; Houston, TX | W 13–7 | 10,000 | |
| November 11 | | at TCU* | Amon G. Carter Stadium; Fort Worth, TX (rivalry) | L 0–14 | | |
| November 18 | | New Mexico | Tech Field; Lubbock, TX | W 13–7 | 1,500 | |
| November 25 | | SMU*^{†} | Tech Field; Lubbock, TX | L 6–7 | 5,000 | |
| December 2 | 2:00 p.m. | South Plains AAF* | Tech Field; Lubbock, TX | W 7–6 | | |
*Non-conference game; ^{†}Homecoming; Rankings from AP Poll released prior to the game; All times are in Central time
