= Dutch Meyer =

American football coach

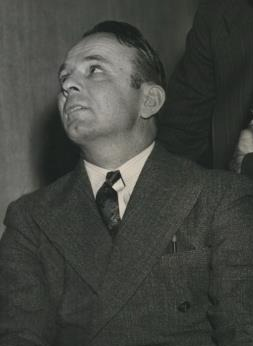
- Meyer in 1942

Biographical details
- Born: January 15, 1898; Ellinger, Texas, U.S.
- Died: December 3, 1982 (aged 84); Fort Worth, Texas, U.S.

Playing career

Football
- 1916–1917: TCU
- 1920–1921: TCU
- Position: End

Coaching career (HC unless noted)

Football
- 1922: Polytechnic HS (TX)
- 1923–1933: TCU (assistant)
- 1934–1952: TCU

Basketball
- 1934–1937: TCU

Baseball
- 1926–1934: TCU
- 1945: TCU
- 1956–1957: TCU

Administrative career (AD unless noted)
- 1950–1963: TCU

Head coaching record
- Overall: 109–79–13 (football); 10–37 (basketball); 111–83–1 (baseball)
- Bowls: 3–4

Accomplishments and honors

Championships
- Football; 2 National (1935, 1938); 3 SWC (1938, 1944, 1951)
- College Football Hall of Fame; Inducted in 1956 (profile)

Leo Robert "Dutch" Meyer (January 15, 1898 – December 3, 1982) was an American football, basketball, and baseball player and coach. He served as the head football coach at Texas Christian University (TCU) from 1934 to 1952, compiling a record of 109–79–13. His TCU Horned Frogs football teams of 1935 and 1938 have been recognized as national champions. Meyer was also the head basketball coach at TCU from 1934 to 1937, tallying a mark of 10–37, and the head baseball coach at TCU (1926–1934, 1945, 1956–1957), amassing a record of 111–83–1. He was inducted into the College Football Hall of Fame as a coach in 1956.

== Biography ==
A native of Ellinger, Texas, Meyer prepped at Waco High School under coach Paul Tyson. He went on to play football, baseball and basketball at TCU, earning 11 varsity letters overall. Upon graduation in 1922 with a degree in geology, Meyer played one summer in the minor leagues for the Cleveland Indians organization. That fall, he coached at Polytechnic High School in Fort Worth, Texas before becoming the freshman coach at TCU in 1923. He was promoted to head coach in 1934.

In 19 years as the Horned Frogs' coach, Meyer amassed a record of 109–79–13. His 109 wins were the most in school history until Gary Patterson passed him in 2012. He led TCU to an undisputed national championship in 1938, and his 1935 team was named national champion by mathematician Paul Williamson. His teams won Southwest Conference championships in 1938, 1944 and 1951.

TCU played in seven bowl games under his tenure, and he coached twelve All-Americans at TCU, including Sammy Baugh, Heisman Trophy winner Davey O'Brien, Darrell Lester and Ki Aldrich.

Meyer helped invent the modern passing game after he saw Baugh playing in a sandlot league and enrolled him at TCU. Because of Baugh's great arm, Coach Meyer created the "Meyer Spread" which is what is now known as the Double-Wing formation. This was a formation where the ends and wingback spread wider than was common for the time.

Sammy Baugh told The Washington Post:

"Dutch Meyer taught us. All the coaches I had in the pros, I didn't learn a damn thing from any of `em compared with what Dutch Meyer taught me. He taught the short pass. The first day we go into a room and he has three S's up on a blackboard; nobody knew what that meant. Then he gives us a little talk and he says, `This is our passing game.' He goes up to the blackboard and he writes three words that complete the S's: `Short, Sure and Safe.' That was his philosophy — the short pass."Everybody loved to throw the long pass. But the point Dutch Meyer made was, `Look at what the short pass can do for you.' You could throw it for seven yards on first down, then run a play or two for a first down, do it all over again and control the ball. That way you could beat a better team."

Meyer's overall coaching style and philosophy is best summed up in a quote still given to TCU athletes before they go out to compete - "Fight 'em until hell freezes over. Then fight 'em on the ice!"

Meyer wrote a book entitled Spread Formations which detailed his ideas about football formations. He retired from coaching in 1952, and became the athletic director at TCU until 1963. He also briefly served as the baseball coach at TCU in 1956, winning an SWC Championship. The same year, he was inducted into the College Football Hall of Fame. He was inducted into the Texas Sports Hall of Fame in Waco in 1957. In 1961 the university named the recently constructed basketball facility, Daniel-Meyer Coliseum, in honor of Coach Meyer and Milton E. Daniel, a TCU trustee.

Meyer earned a number of nicknames through the years, including "Mr. Football," "The Saturday Fox," "Old Iron Pants" and "Old Dutch," in reference to his nephew, L. D. Meyer, who played for him at TCU and was known at "Little Dutch."

There is currently an up-scale burger joint on University Drive right next to campus called "Dutch's" that is dedicated to the former TCU coach.

== Head coaching record ==
=== Football ===
Year	Team	Overall	Conference	Standing	Bowl/playoffs	Coaches^{#}	AP^{°}
TCU Horned Frogs (Southwest Conference) (1934–1952)
1934	TCU	8–4	3–3	4th			
1935	TCU	12–1	5–1	2nd	W Sugar		
1936	TCU	9–2–2	4–1–1	2nd	W Cotton		16
1937	TCU	4–4–2	3–1–2	2nd			16
1938	TCU	11–0	6–0	1st	W Sugar		1
1939	TCU	3–7	1–5	6th			
1940	TCU	3–7	2–4	5th			
1941	TCU	7–3–1	4–1–1	T–2nd	L Orange		
1942	TCU	7–3	4–2	3rd			
1943	TCU	2–6	1–4	T–5th			
1944	TCU	7–3–1	3–1–1	1st	L Cotton		
1945	TCU	5–5	3–3	T–3rd			
1946	TCU	2–7–1	2–4	T–5th			
1947	TCU	4–5–2	2–3–1	4th	L Delta		
1948	TCU	4–5–1	1–4–1	6th			
1949	TCU	6–3–1	3–3	T–3rd			
1950	TCU	5–5	3–3	T–3rd			
1951	TCU	6–5	5–1	1st	L Cotton	10	11
1952	TCU	4–4–2	2–2–2	4th			
TCU:		109–79–13	57–46–9				
Total:		109–79–13					
National championship Conference title Conference division title or championship game berth
^{#}Rankings from final Coaches Poll.; ^{°}Rankings from final AP Poll.
