= 1944 North Texas Aggies football team =

American college football season

1944 North Texas Aggies football
- Conference: Independent
- Record: 2–6
- Head coach: Klepto Holmes (10th season)

1944 Southern college football independents records
	Conf.			Overall
Team	W	L	T	W		L		T
Virginia		–		6	–	1	–	2
No. 4 Navy		–		6	–	3	–	0
West Virginia		–		5	–	3	–	1
Millsaps		–		3	–	6	–	0
Delaware State		–		2	–	3	–	0
Tennessee Tech		–		1	–	2	–	0
North Texas Aggies		–		2	–	6	–	0
Miami (FL)		–		1	–	7	–	1
Sewanee		–		0	–	3	–	1
Howard (AL)		–		0	–	5	–	0
Rankings from AP Poll

The 1944 North Texas Aggies football team represented North Texas Agricultural College (NTAC)—now known as the University of Texas at Arlington—as an independent during the 1944 college football season. In their tenth year under head coach Klepto Holmes, the Aggies compiled a record of 2–6.

== Season personnel ==
The 1944 North Texas Agricultural College roster reflected the unusual conditions of college football during World War II, when military service and wartime training programs affected player movement between schools. Among the players associated with the team was Lloyd Burditt, who played at North Texas Agricultural College in 1944 before being assigned to military service at Pearl Harbor the following year.

Contemporary coverage described the North Texas Aggies as a light but fast team. Before the game against SMU, blocking back Butch Butchofsky and backs Bobby Goff and Jimmie Cashion were identified as key members of the offense.

The college's 1945 yearbook also lists players including Manuel N. Bass and J. Wm. McLean at end, E. P. "Bud" Dosher and Edward Eberhard at back, Albert N. Davis and Jack Mimms at tackle, and Vernon Gladwin, Thomas A. Ritchie and Bert J. Powell at guard.

== Schedule ==
Date	Time	Opponent	Site	Result	Attendance	Source
September 23	7:45 p.m.	at Tulsa	Skelly Field; Tulsa, OK	L 6–47	12,000	
September 30		at SMU	Ownby Stadium; University Park, TX	L 0–49	5,000	
October 6		South Plains AAF	Arlington, TX	W 15–0		
October 13		at Southwestern (TX)	Georgetown, TX	L 7–39	1,500	
October 21		vs. No. 19 Second Air Force	Fly Stadium; Odessa, TX	L 0–68	8,000	
October 28		at Texas A&M	Kyle Field; College Station, TX	L 0–61		
November 4		at No. 4 Randolph Field	Alamo Stadium; San Antonio, TX	L 0–68		
November 10		at John Tarleton	Hays Field; Stephenville, TX	W 12–0		
Rankings from AP Poll released prior to the game; All times are in Central time
