= Dale Liston =

American football coach

Biographical details
- Education: Heidelberg (1966)

Coaching career (HC unless noted)
- 1978: Akron (DC)
- 1979–1984: Friends
- 1988–1991: Thiel
- 1992–1994: Manchester

Administrative career (AD unless noted)
- 1988–1991: Thiel

Head coaching record
- Overall: 49–72

Accomplishments and honors

Awards
- PAC Coach of the Year (1989)

Dale A. Liston is a retired American football coach. He served as the head coach at Friends University in Wichita, Kansas (1979–1984), Thiel College in Greenville, Pennsylvania (1988–1991), and Manchester University in North Manchester, Indiana (1992–1994).

== Head coaching record ==
Year	Team	Overall	Conference	Standing	Bowl/playoffs
Friends Falcons (Kansas Collegiate Athletic Conference) (1979–1984)
1979	Friends	7–2	6–2	3rd	
1980	Friends	4–5	3–5	6th	
1981	Friends	5–4	5–3	T–3rd	
1982	Friends	5–4	5–4	T–4th	
1983	Friends	2–7	2–7	10th	
1984	Friends	4–6	4–5	T–6th	
Friends:		27–28	25–26		
Thiel Tomcats (Presidents' Athletic Conference) (1988–1991)
1988	Thiel	0–9	0–6	7th	
1989	Thiel	3–6	3–2	3rd	
1990	Thiel	4–5	1–3	T–3rd	
1991	Thiel	5–4	2–2	3rd	
Thiel:		12–24	6–13		
Manchester Spartans (Indiana Collegiate Athletic Conference) (1992–1994)
1992	Manchester	5–5	2–4	T–5th	
1993	Manchester	5–5	2–4	T–4th	
1994	Manchester	0–10	0–6	7th	
Manchester:		10–20	4–14		
Total:		49–72			
