= 1944 TCU Horned Frogs football team =

American college football season

1944 TCU Horned Frogs football

SWC champion

Cotton Bowl Classic, L 0–34 vs. Oklahoma A&M
- Conference: Southwest Conference
- Record: 7–3–1 (3–1–1 SWC)
- Head coach: Dutch Meyer (11th season)
- Offensive scheme: Meyer spread
- Captain: Clyde Flowers
- Home stadium: Amon G. Carter Stadium

1944 Southwest Conference football standings
	Conf.					Overall
Team	W		L		T	W		L		T
TCU $	3	–	1	–	1	7	–	3	–	1
Texas	3	–	2	–	0	5	–	4	–	0
Arkansas	2	–	2	–	1	5	–	5	–	1
Texas A&M	2	–	3	–	0	7	–	4	–	0
SMU	2	–	3	–	0	5	–	5	–	0
Rice	2	–	3	–	0	5	–	6	–	0
$ – Conference champion

The 1944 TCU Horned Frogs football team represented Texas Christian University (TCU) in the 1944 college football season. The Horned Frogs finished the season 7–3–1 overall and 3–1–1 in the Southwest Conference. The team was coached by Dutch Meyer in his eleventh year as head coach. The Frogs played their home games in Amon G. Carter Stadium, which is located on campus in Fort Worth, Texas. They were invited to the Cotton Bowl Classic, where they lost to Oklahoma A&M by a score of 34–0.

== Schedule ==
Date	Time	Opponent	Site	Result	Attendance	Source
September 23		vs. Kansas*	Blues Stadium; Kansas City, MO	W 7–0	11,516	
September 30	4:00 p.m.	South Plains AAF	Amon G. Carter Stadium; Fort Worth, TX	W 34–0	4,000	
October 7		Arkansas	Amon G. Carter Stadium; Fort Worth, TX	T 6–6		
October 21		at Texas A&M	Kyle Field; College Station, TX (rivalry)	W 13–7		
October 28		vs. Oklahoma	Taft Stadium; Oklahoma City, OK	L 19–34		
November 4		at Chatham Field*	Savannah, GA	W 19–7	6,000	
November 11		Texas Tech	Amon G. Carter Stadium; Fort Worth, TX (rivalry)	W 14–0		
November 18		at Texas	Amon G. Carter Stadium; Fort Worth, TX (rivalry)	W 7–6	2,000	
November 25		at Rice	Rice Field; Houston, TX	W 9–6		
December 2		at SMU	Ownby Stadium; University Park, TX (rivalry)	L 6–9	8,000	
January 1, 1945		vs. Oklahoma A&M	Cotton Bowl; Dallas, TX (Cotton Bowl Classic)	L 0–34	37,500	
*Non-conference game; All times are in Central time
