= Dave Harms =

American football player and coach

Biographical details
- Education: Drake (1980)

Playing career
- 1976–1979: Drake
- Position: Offensive lineman

Coaching career (HC unless noted)
- 1995–2003: Manchester

Head coaching record
- Overall: 23–63

Dave Harms is an American former football coach. He served as the head coach at Manchester University in North Manchester, Indiana, from 1995 to 2003.

Harms played college football at Drake University.

== Head coaching record ==
Year	Team	Overall	Conference	Standing	Bowl/playoffs
Manchester Spartans (Indiana Collegiate Athletic Conference / Heartland Collegiate Athletic Conference) (1995–2003)
1995	Manchester	4–6			
1996	Manchester	4–6	2–4		
1997	Manchester	6–4	2–4		
1998	Manchester	2–8	2–5	T–6th	
1999	Manchester	2–8	0–7	8th	
2000	Manchester	2–8	1–5	6th	
2001	Manchester	2–8	1–5	6th	
2002	Manchester	3–7	2–4	T–4th	
2003	Manchester	2–8	1–5	6th	
Manchester:		27–63	7–31		
Total:		27–63			
