= Greg Carlson =

American football coach (1948–2025)

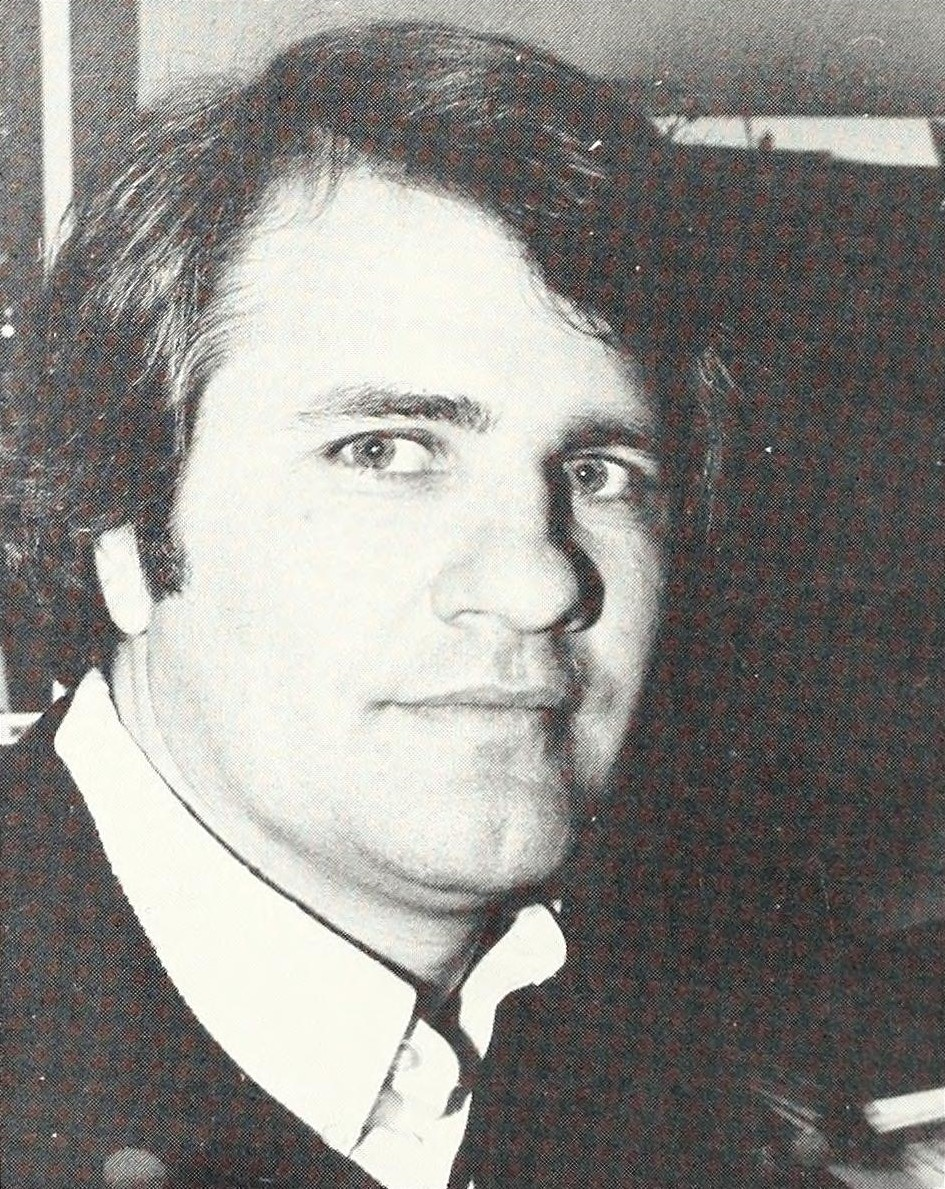
- Carlson, c. 1983

Biographical details
- Born: March 5, 1948; Lansing, Michigan, U.S.
- Died: November 15, 2025 (aged 77); Crawfordsville, Indiana, U.S.
- Education: Wisconsin–Oshkosh (1970)

Coaching career (HC unless noted)

Football
- c. 1970: Oklahoma (GA)
- 1972–1976: Metairie Park Country Day (LA)
- 1977–1979: Evansville (assistant)
- 1980–1982: Wabash (DC)
- 1983–2000: Wabash
- 2001: Illinois (dir. ops.)
- 2002: Ball State (assistant)
- 2003–2005: Whittier
- 2006: Los Angeles Avengers (DL/LB)
- 2008–2013: St. Scholastica

Golf
- c. 1982: Wabash

Head coaching record
- Overall: 156–101–2 (college football); 32–14–1 (high school football)
- Tournaments: Football; 0–3 (NCAA D-III playoffs)

Accomplishments and honors

Championships
- Football; 4 ICAC/HCAC (1991–1992, 1994, 1998); 3 UMAC (2011–2013)

Greg Carlson (March 5, 1948 – November 15, 2025) was an American football coach. He was the head football coach at Wabash College from 1983 to 2001, at Whittier College from 2003 to 2005, and at the College of St. Scholastica from 2008 to 2013. Carlson was hired in 2007 as St. Scholastica's first football coach. The program began play the following season in 2008.

== Early life and education ==
Carlson was born in Lansing, Michigan, on March 5, 1948. He graduated from Wauwatosa West High School in Wauwatosa, Wisconsin. Carlson earned a bachelor's degree in physical education from Wisconsin State College Oshkosh—now known as the University of Wisconsin–Oshkosh and a Master of Education degree from the University of Oklahoma.

== Coaching career ==
Carlson began his coaching career at the high school level in New Orleans. He then was a graduate assistant at the University of Oklahoma under Chuck Fairbanks. From 1977 to 1979, he served as an assistant football coach at University of Evansville under John Moses. In 1980, Carlson was hired as the defensive coordinator at Wabash under Stan Parrish. He succeeded Parrish as head football coach in 1983. Carlson also coached golf at Wabash.

== Death ==
Carlson died in Crawfordsville on November 15, 2025, at the age of 77.

== Head coaching record ==
=== College football ===
Year	Team	Overall	Conference	Standing	Bowl/playoffs
Wabash Little Giants (NCAA Division III independent) (1983–1988)
1983	Wabash	5–4			
1984	Wabash	8–2			
1985	Wabash	7–2–1			
1986	Wabash	6–3			
1987	Wabash	8–2			
1988	Wabash	7–2			
Wabash Little Giants (Indiana Collegiate Athletic Conference / Heartland Collegiate Athletic Conference) (1989–1999)
1989	Wabash	5–4	3–4	T–5th	
1990	Wabash	4–5	4–3	T–3rd	
1991	Wabash	7–2	5–1	1st	
1992	Wabash	6–2–1	5–0–1	1st	
1993	Wabash	5–4	4–2	3rd	
1994	Wabash	6–3	5–1	T–1st	
1995	Wabash	5–5	2–4	T–5th	
1996	Wabash	7–3	4–2	2nd	
1997	Wabash	6–4	4–2	3rd	
1998	Wabash	9–1	7–0	1st	
1999	Wabash	5–5	5–2	3rd	
Wabash Little Giants (North Coast Athletic Conference) (2000)
2000	Wabash	6–4	5–2	3rd	
Wabash:		112–57–2	53–23–1		
Whittier Poets (Southern California Intercollegiate Athletic Conference) (2003–2005)
2003	Whittier	1–8	1–5	6th	
2004	Whittier	2–7	1–5	T–6th	
2005	Whittier	2–7	0–6	7th	
Whittier:		5–22	2–16		
St. Scholastica Saints (Upper Midwest Athletic Conference) (2008–2013)
2008	St. Scholastica	1–7	0–4	5th	
2009	St. Scholastica	4–6	2–2	3rd (North)	
2010	St. Scholastica	7–3	5–2	2nd	
2011	St. Scholastica	10–1	9–0	1st	L NCAA Division III First Round
2012	St. Scholastica	8–3	7–1	T–1st	L NCAA Division III First Round
2013	St. Scholastica	9–2	9–0	1st	L NCAA Division III First Round
St. Scholastica:		39–22	32–9		
Total:		156–101–2			
National championship Conference title Conference division title or championship game berth
