= 2011 Kilimanjaro Bowl =

2011 Global Kilimanjaro Bowl
CONADEIP All-Stars	Drake Bulldogs
(1–1)	(7–4)
7	17
Head coach: Juan Carlos Maya	Head coach: Chris Creighton
	1	2	3	4	Total
CONADEIP	0	0	0	7	7
Drake	3	0	0	14	17
- Date: May 21, 2011
- Season: 2010
- Stadium: Sheikh Amri Abeid Memorial Stadium
- Location: Arusha, Tanzania
- Referee: Bill LeMonnier
- Attendance: 11,781

United States TV coverage
- Network: ITV
- Announcers: Mike Carlson (play-by-play), Reggie Brooks (color analyst)

International TV coverage
- Network: ITV
- Announcers: Mike Carlson (play-by-play), Reggie Brooks (color analyst)

The 2011 Global Kilimanjaro Bowl was the first college football game played on the continent of Africa. The game at the Sheikh Amri Abeid Memorial Stadium in Arusha, Tanzania, was played on May 21, 2011, due to the seasonal difference in Africa, featuring Drake against an All-Star team of Mexican players from the CONADEIP league. It marked the first NCAA Division I bowl game versus a Mexican opponent since the 1945 Sun Bowl, and the first to be played after the BCS Championship Game.

== Organization ==
The title sponsor of the game was Global Football, along with counterpart sponsors Iowa Resource for International Service (IRIS), IRIS Youth Exchange & Study Program alumni from Tanzania, Tanapa Partners and Younger Optics.

While in Africa, the teams ran youth camps and worked on orphanage service projects. They also climbed Mount Kilimanjaro before returning to North America. In all, the trip lasted 15 days.

The idea for the game was conceived by Drake head coach and climbing enthusiast Chris Creighton, who suggested the idea to Global Football president Patrick Steenberge.

=== Bowl game itinerary ===
2010–2011 Global Kilimanjaro Bowl Schedule
May 17–18: Depart Des Moines, Iowa & Mexico City, Mexico - Arrive in Arusha, Tanzania	May 19–20: Youth camps
May 21: Global Kilimanjaro Bowl	May 22–24: Youth orphanage service projects
May 25–30: Climb Mount Kilimanjaro	May 31 – June 1: Depart Arusha, Tanzania - Arrive in Des Moines, Iowa & Mexico City, Mexico
Total Trip — 15 Days

== Game recap ==
The Drake Bulldogs and CONADEIP All-Stars from Mexico met on the gridiron painted for the first time on African soil in Arusha, Tanzania. Fans lined up outside Sheikh Amri Abeid Memorial Stadium for three hours before kickoff, although their entrance to the stadium was delayed due to tight security measures.

Drake opened with a drive that started at their own 20-yard mark, but the drive stalled when quarterback Mike Piatkowski was intercepted in the corner of the end zone by CONADEIP cornerback Carlos García. The Bulldogs turned the ball over on downs (fourth and inches on the CONADEIP goal line) during the next drive and they took the initial lead after their third offensive possession courtesy of a 27-yard field goal made by Billy Janssen. Injury would hit Drake’s quarterbacking core as Piatkowski was injured in the first quarter and his replacement Tyler Castro (the Bulldogs regular back-up Cody Seeger was unavailable for action) left due to an injury later in the second quarter.

Both teams went scoreless in the second and third quarter. Two promising CONADEIP drives ended with failed field goal attempts. CONADEIP also fumbled inside the Drake 10-yard line. Freshman quarterback Nick Ens took his first snaps under center for the Bulldogs due to the injuries of Piatkowski and Castro. Drake would struggle to find an offensive rhythm.

A CONADEIP Dewin García 49-yard pass to Ivan Piña as time expired in the third quarter delighted the capacity crowd. José Reyes would score the first touchdown of the game on a 5-yard rush to give the All-Stars a 7-3 lead. Drake would fight back on their ensuing offensive possession. Ens settled into a groove with the Drake offense and completed an 18-yard pass over the middle to wide receiver Joey Orlando on third and long. The gain kept the drive alive leading to a touchdown by the Bulldogs, a 11-yard pass to Orlando in the corner of the end zone. Having seen Drake regain the lead at 10-7, the CONADEIP offense drove down the field to the Bulldogs 2-yard line, capped by Reyes' 37-yard run (he was tripped only two yards short of the end zone). The All-Stars fumbled on the next possession due to a botched snap from the center and the Bulldog defense recovered the loose football. Drake would take advantage of the opportunity, driving 98 yards, ending in a Patrick Cashmore 2-yard rushing touchdown. With just over two minutes remaining in the game, Bulldog Matt Buckley intercepted a pass by García to seal the 17-7 Drake victory.

"It truly was a magical day," said Drake coach Chris Creighton. "I think everybody had the sense that we were part of something way bigger than ourselves, just bigger than a football game. It was emotional, kind of the realization of something very special to all of us."

The game was an exhibition game and was not included on Drake's record. CONADEIP finished their tour with a 1-2 record. The All-Star team selected from top college players from Mexico's CONADEIP league and had played two games in Mexico in order to prepare for the bowl. The game was watched by the American Ambassador to Tanzania Alfonso Lenhardt, the nation’s Deputy Minister of Industry and Trade Lazaro Nayland, and a procession of dignitaries. Maasai tribesmen entertained the crowd where cheerleaders would have danced in an American stadium.

== Scoring summary ==
First quarter

Drake - Billy Janssen 27 Yard Field Goal

Second quarter

None

Third quarter

None

Fourth quarter

CONADEIP - José Reyes 5-Yard Run (Erick Gómez Vargas Kick)

Drake - Nick Ens 11-Yard Pass To Joey Orlando (Billy Janssen Kick)

Drake - Patrick Cashmore 2-Yard Run (Billy Janssen Kick)

== See also ==
- 2010 NCAA Division I FCS football season
- List of historically significant college football games
