= Yankee Stadium (1923) =

Former baseball stadium in the Bronx, New York

- "The House That Ruth Built" "The Cathedral of Baseball"; The Stadium "The Bronx Zoo"
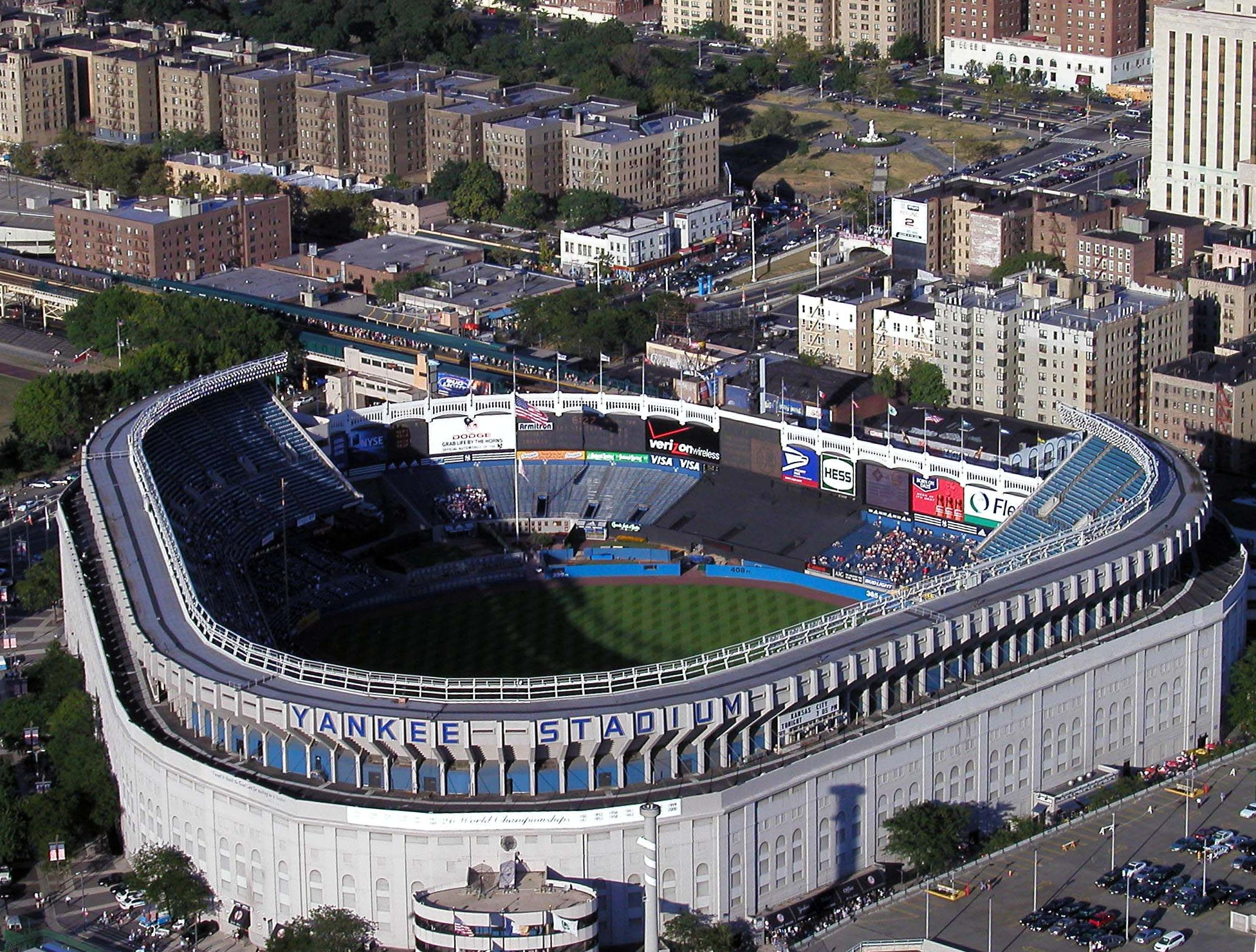
- Original Yankee Stadium in August 2002

- Location in New York City Location in New York State Location in the United States
- Interactive map of Yankee Stadium
- Address: East 161st Street & River Avenue
- Location: The Bronx, New York City, U.S.
- Coordinates: 40°49′37″N 73°55′41″W
- Owner: City of New York
- Operator: New York Yankees
- Capacity: 58,000 (1923) • 82,000 (1927) • 62,000 (1929) • 71,699 (1937) • 70,000 (1942) • 67,000 (1948) • 67,205 (1958) • 67,337 (1961) • 67,000 (1965) • 65,010 (1971) • 54,028 (1976) • 57,145 (1977) • 57,545 (1980) • 57,478 (2003) • 56,936 (2005)
- Surface: Grass
- Record attendance: 123,707 on August 3, 1958 Jehovah's Witnesses International Convention
- Field size: Left Field – 318 feet (97 m); Left-Center – 399 feet (122 m); Center Field – 408 feet (124 m); Right-Center – 385 feet (117 m); Right Field – 314 feet (96 m); Backstop – 84 feet (26 m)

Construction
- Groundbreaking: May 5, 1922
- Opened: April 18, 1923; April 15, 1976 (re-opening)
- Renovated: October 1973 – April 1976
- Closed: September 30, 1973 (renovations); September 21, 2008 (final game); November 9, 2008 (final tour)
- Reopened: April 15, 1976
- Demolished: March 16, 2009 – May 13, 2010
- Cost: $2.4 million ($34,417,738.10 in 2022); Renovations: $167 million (1976; $945 million in 2025)
- Architects: Osborn Engineering Corporation (1923); Praeger-Kavanaugh-Waterbury (1976)
- General contractor: White Construction Co. (1923)

Tenants
- New York Yankees (MLB) 1923–1973, 1976–2008; Manhattan Jaspers (NCAA), 1932, 1938, 1940; NYU Violets (NCAA) part-time, 1926–1948; New York Yankees (AFL I / NFL) 1926–1928; New York Yankees (AFL II) 1936–1937; New York Yankees (AFL III) 1940; New York Americans (AFL III) 1941; New York Yankees (AAFC) 1946–1949; New York Yanks (NFL) 1950–1951; New York Giants (NFL) 1956–1973; Gotham Bowl (NCAA) 1962; New York Skyliners (USA) 1967; New York Generals (NPSL / NASL) 1967–1968; New York Cosmos (NASL) 1971, 1976; New York Black Yankees (NLB) 1931, 1941–1948; New York Cubans (NLB) 1941–1946

The original Yankee Stadium was located in the Bronx in New York City. It was the home of the New York Yankees from 1923 to 2008, except for 1974–1975 when it was renovated. It hosted 6,581 Yankees regular season home games during its 85-year history. It was also the home of the New York Giants of the National Football League (NFL) from October 21, 1956 through September 23, 1973. The stadium's nickname is "The House That Ruth Built" which is derived from Babe Ruth, the baseball superstar whose prime years coincided with the stadium's opening and the beginning of the Yankees' winning history.

The stadium was built from 1922 to 1923 for $2.4 million (equivalent to $45.4 million in 2025). Its construction was paid for entirely by Yankees owner Jacob Ruppert, who was eager to have his own stadium after sharing the Polo Grounds with the New York Giants baseball team the previous ten years. Yankee Stadium opened for the 1923 season and was hailed at the time as a unique facility in the country. Over the course of its history, it became one of the most famous venues in the United States, hosting a variety of events and historic moments during its existence. Many of these moments were baseball-related, including World Series games, no-hitters, perfect games, and historic home runs, but the stadium also hosted boxing matches, the 1958 NFL Championship Game, college football, concerts, and three Papal Masses. Its condition deteriorated in the 1960s and 1970s, prompting its closure for renovation from October 1973 through 1975. The renovation significantly altered the appearance of the venue and reduced the distance of the outfield fences.

In 2006, the Yankees began construction on a new $2.3 billion stadium in public parkland adjacent to the existing stadium, which included $1.2 billion in public subsidies. The design included a replica of the frieze along the roof that had been part of the original Yankee Stadium. Monument Park, a Hall of Fame for prominent former Yankees, was relocated to the new stadium.

Yankee Stadium closed following the 2008 season and the new stadium opened in 2009, adopting the "Yankee Stadium" moniker. The original Yankee Stadium was demolished in 2010, two years after it closed, and the 8-acre (3.2 ha) site was converted into a public park called Heritage Field.

== History ==
=== Planning and construction ===
The Yankees had played at the Polo Grounds in upper Manhattan since 1913, sharing the venue with the New York Giants. However, relations between the two teams were rocky, with the Giants harboring resentment towards the Yankees. The Yankees had been looking for a new and permanent venue since at least 1909. The local papers had periodic announcements about the Yankees acquiring and developing land in the Kingsbridge neighborhood for a new ballpark northeast of 225th and Broadway, and wrote about the park as if its construction was already in progress. The Kingsbridge pipe dream continued with new owners Ruppert and Huston, but nothing came of it. The Yankees would remain tenants at the Polo Grounds for ten years, the same length of time they had spent at Hilltop Park.

For the 1920 season, the Yankees acquired star slugger Babe Ruth and in his first year with his new team, the Yankees drew 1.3 million fans to the Polo Grounds, outdrawing the Giants. By the middle of 1920, the Giants had issued an eviction notice to the Yankees, which was soon rescinded. In 1921, the Yankees won their first American League pennant (but lost the then-best-of-nine 1921 World Series to the Giants in eight games, all played at the Polo Grounds). This exacerbated Giants owner Charles Stoneham's and manager John McGraw's resentment of the Yankees and reinforced their insistence that the Yankees find another place to play their home games. McGraw, always ready with a pointed quote for the sportswriters, derisively suggested that the Yankees relocate "to Queens or some other out-of-the-way place".

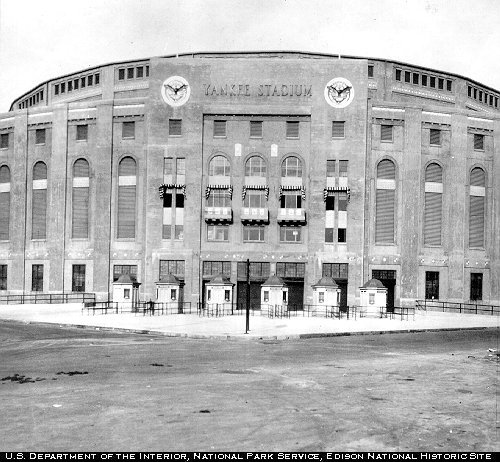
Main entrance during the 1920s

Tillinghast L'Hommedieu Huston and Jacob Ruppert, the Yankees' owners since January 1915, finally decided to put the club's dream into reality and build their own stadium. The owners did so at considerable financial risk and speculation. Baseball teams typically played in 30,000-seat facilities, but Huston and Ruppert invoked Ruth's name when asked how the Yankees could justify a ballpark with 60,000 seats. The doubt over the Yankees' lasting power was amplified by baseball's sagging popularity after the 1919 Black Sox Scandal, in which eight Chicago White Sox players were expelled for conspiring with gamblers to fix that year's World Series. Many people also felt three baseball teams could not prosper in New York City, but Huston and Ruppert were confident the Yankees could thrive amongst the more established New York Giants and Brooklyn Dodgers of the National League (their gamble eventually paid off: Both National League teams relocated to California following the 1957 season). The total bill for construction of the stadium was $2.5 million.

Huston and Ruppert explored many areas for Yankee Stadium. Of the other sites being considered, the Hebrew Orphan Asylum, at Amsterdam Avenue between 136th and 138th streets in Manhattan, nearly became reality. Consideration was also given to building atop railroad tracks on the West Side of Manhattan (an idea revived in 1998) and to Long Island City, in Queens. The area Huston and Ruppert settled on was a 10 acres (4.0 ha) lumberyard in the Bronx within walking distance from and in sight of, Coogan's Bluff. The Polo Grounds was located on the Manhattan side of the Harlem River, at 155th Street and Eighth Avenue. Huston and Ruppert purchased the lumberyard from William Waldorf Astor for $600,000, equal to $11.5 million today. Construction began May 5, 1922 and Yankee Stadium opened to the public less than a year later. The stadium's walls were built of "an extremely hard and durable concrete that was developed and supplied by Thomas Edison", with a total of 20,000 cubic yards (15,000 m^{3}) of concrete used in the original structure.

=== 1923–1973 ===
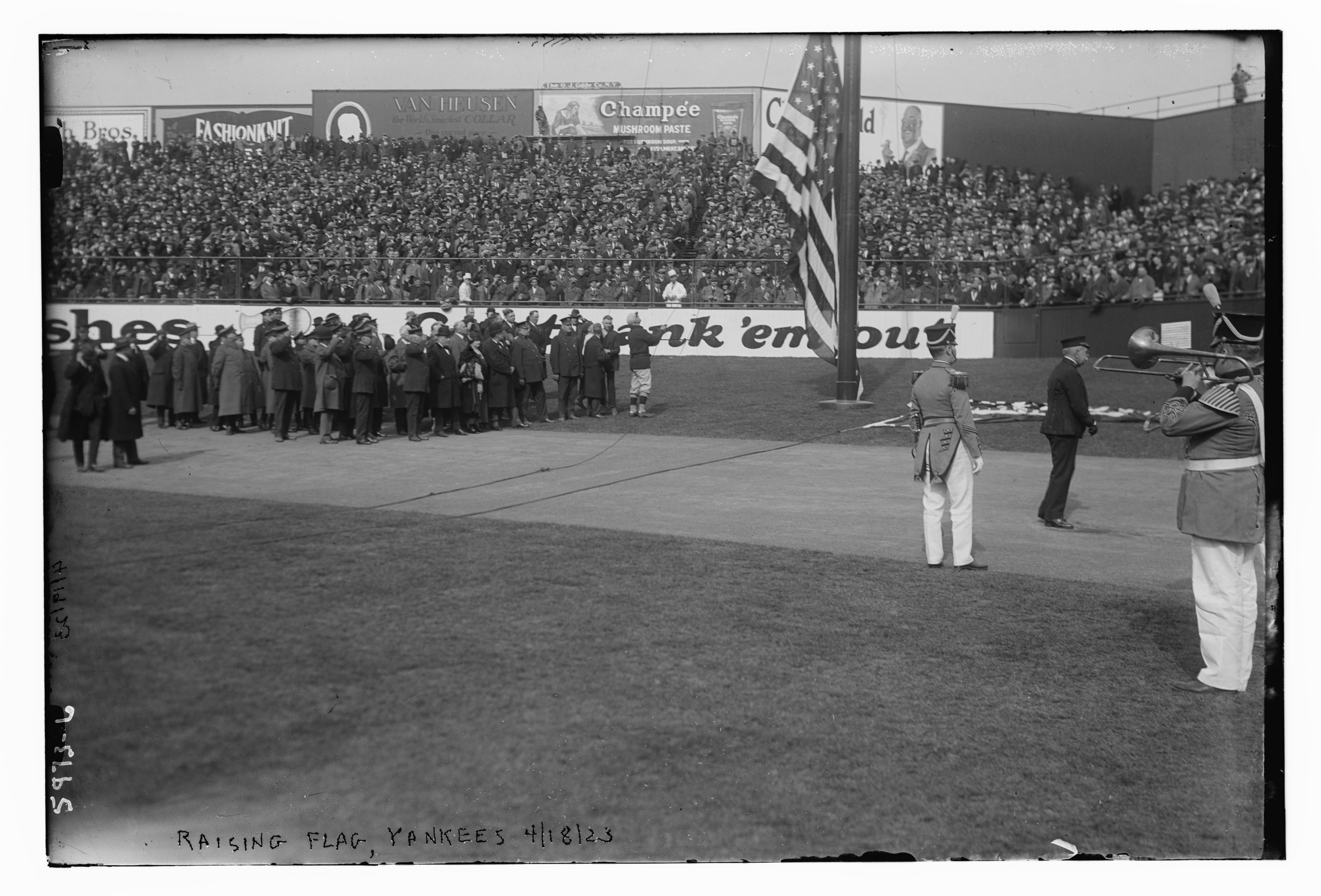
The raising of the American flag on Opening Day in 1923

Yankee Stadium officially opened on Wednesday, April 18, 1923, with the Yankees' first home game, against the Boston Red Sox. According to the New York Evening Telegram, "everything smelled of ... fresh paint, fresh plaster and fresh grass". At 3 pm, the composer-conductor John Philip Sousa led the Seventh ("Silk-Stocking") Regiment Band in playing The Star-Spangled Banner. After a parade of the players and dignitaries, Babe Ruth was presented with a case containing a symbolically big bat. New York Governor Al Smith threw out the first pitch directly into the glove of catcher Wally Schang rather than the customary couple of feet wide. The Yankees went on to defeat Ruth's former team, the Boston Red Sox, by a score of 4–1, with Ruth hitting a three-run home run into the right-field stands. Asked later for his opinion of the stadium, he replied, "Some ball yard."

Field layout compared with Polo Grounds

Upon opening, Fred Lieb of the New York Evening Telegram dubbed it "The House That Ruth Built". The Yankees also won their first World Series during the Stadium's inaugural season. Future Yankee manager Casey Stengel hit the first post-season home run in stadium history while playing with the opposing New York Giants. The only other teams to do so prior to the 2006 St. Louis Cardinals in (the new) Busch Stadium had been the Pittsburgh Pirates, who won the 1909 World Series in Forbes Field's inaugural season, and the Boston Red Sox, who won the 1912 World Series in Fenway Park's first year. The Yankees accomplished this feat yet again in the New Yankee Stadium in the 2009 World Series.

The Stadium was the first facility in North America with three tiers, although the triple deck originally extended only to the left and right field corners. The concrete lower deck extended well into left field, with the obvious intention of extending the upper deck over it, which was accomplished during the 1927–28 off-season. As originally built, the stadium seated 58,000. For the stadium's first game, the announced attendance was 74,217 (with another 25,000 turned away); however, Yankees business manager Ed Barrow later admitted that the actual attendance was closer to 60,000. Regardless of what the figure was, it was undoubtedly more than the 42,000 fans who attended game five of the 1916 World Series at Braves Field, baseball's previous attendance record. However, during the 1920s and 1930s, the Yankees' popularity was such that crowds in excess of 80,000 were not uncommon. It was referred to as "the Yankee Stadium" (with the "s" in "stadium" sometimes lowercase) until the 1950s.

Yankee Stadium underwent more extensive renovations from 1936 through 1938. During the 1936 season, the wooden bleachers were replaced with concrete, shrinking the "death valley" area of left and center substantially, although the area was still much deeper than in most ballparks. During the 1937 season, the second and third decks were extended to short right center. Runways were left between the bleachers and the triple-deck on each end, serving as bullpens. By 1938, the Stadium had assumed the "classic" shape that it would retain for the next 35 years. In April 1945, Yankees president Larry MacPhail announced that after the War, the Yankees would install an additional tier of bleachers to increase stadium capacity to 100,000. In addition to the bleachers, he also planned to add 2,000 additional box-seats by lowering the field and shortening the distance from the backstop to home-plate from 82 to 60 feet (25 to 18 m). However, the plans fell through and the expansion did not take place.

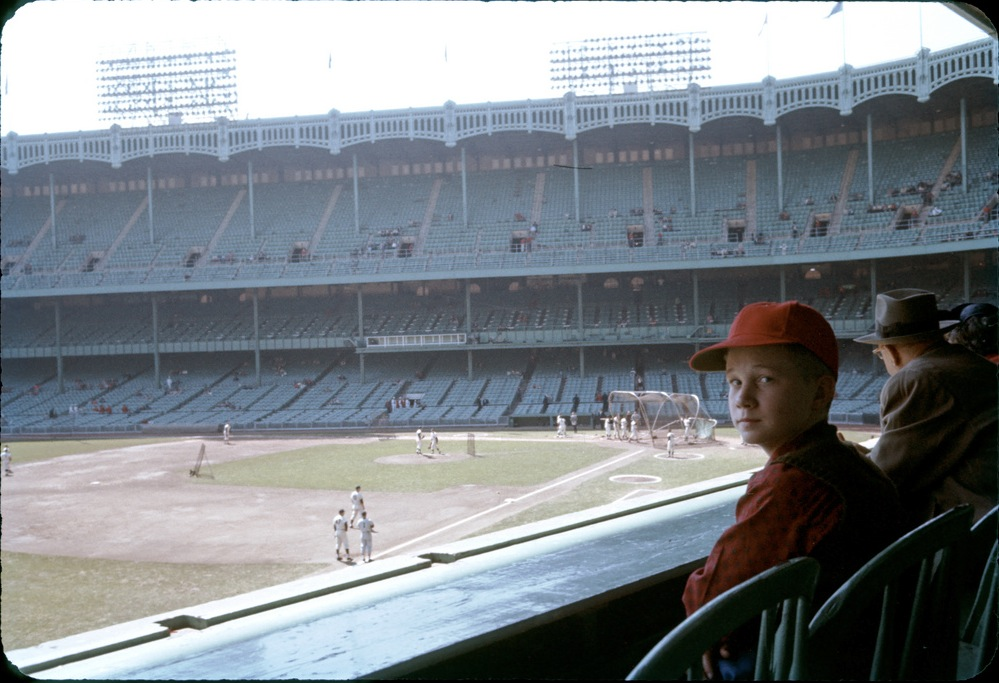
A pre-renovation Yankee Stadium in 1959

Some sources incorrectly state that prior to the 1955 season, Yankee Stadium's Ballantine Beer scoreboard was sold to the Phillies for use in Shibe Park. Although the two scoreboards possessed some superficial resemblances, they differed in detail. The Yankee Stadium scoreboard remained at Yankee Stadium until 1959 when it was replaced, two years after a different Ballantine scoreboard was installed at Shibe (by then renamed Connie Mack Stadium).

The stadium was owned by the Yankees until December 17, 1953 when the ballclub's co-owners Dan Topping and Del Webb sold it and Blues Stadium for $6.5 million ($57,676,180 in 2016 dollars) to Arnold Johnson, who also dealt the land under the ballpark to the Knights of Columbus for $2 million ($17,746,517 in 2016 dollars). After he purchased the Philadelphia Athletics and transferred the franchise to Kansas City on November 8, 1954, Johnson sold Yankee Stadium to John W. Cox on March 22, 1955. Cox, a 1927 graduate of Rice University, donated the ballpark to his alma mater on July 19, 1962.

In the 1966–67 offseason, during the period in which Rice owned the stadium, the concrete exterior was painted white, and the interior was painted blue. The metal frieze circling the upper deck was painted white.

=== 1974–75 renovations and beyond ===
In 1970, newly reelected Mayor John Lindsay approached team president Michael Burke of CBS, which owned the Yankees, with an offer to spend $25 million on improvements to Yankee Stadium. (Six years earlier, the Mets' new home, Shea Stadium, had opened in Queens at a similar public cost.) By this time, it was obvious that the stadium had significant structural issues; concrete chunks were seen by several fans falling from the stands.

Burke floated two proposals to build a new stadium on the same site in the Bronx; one included a dome. CBS also asked for 10,000 additional parking spaces and road improvements to alleviate traffic. In August 1971, the New York Giants football team announced that it would leave Yankee Stadium for a new football-only stadium in the Meadowlands Sports Complex under development in New Jersey. In 1971, the city of New York forced (via eminent domain) Rice to sell the stadium for a mere $2.5 million (equivalent to $19.9 million today). That December, after significant lobbying by Lindsay, the New York City Board of Estimate approved $24 million ($140 million in 2014 dollars) for the city to renovate Yankee Stadium. The figure included $3.5 million for the purchase of the stadium and the 8-acre (3.2 ha) piece of land from Rice University and the Knights of Columbus. At the time, New York City was on the brink of bankruptcy. In January 1973, CBS sold the Yankees to a group led by George Steinbrenner for $10 million. Yankee Stadium closed for renovation on September 30, 1973. The Yankees played their home games in 1974 and 1975 at Shea Stadium (The NFL Giants played their last Yankee Stadium game on September 23 (a tie), then went to the Yale Bowl through 1974, Shea in 1975, and the new Giants Stadium in 1976). When the renovated stadium opened in 1976 on April 15, the cost had ballooned to $160 million ($905 million in 2025 dollars); originally borne by New York City, it is now being paid off by New York State.

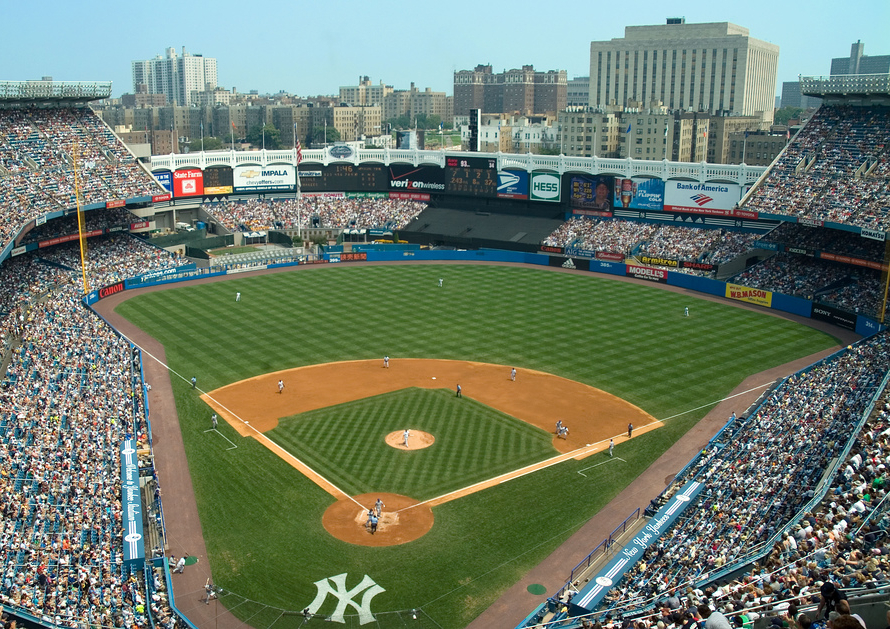
The post-renovation interior of the stadium, pictured in August 2007.

The outside shell of the stadium remained the same, with its original concrete walls painted over. Among the more noticeable changes after the renovation was the removal of 118 columns reinforcing each tier of the stadium's grandstand. The stadium's roof, including its distinctive 15 feet (4.6 m) metal frieze, was replaced by the new upper shell and new lights were added. A white painted concrete replica of the frieze was added atop the wall encircling the bleachers. The playing field was lowered by about 7 feet (2.1 m) and moved outward slightly. Escalators and ramps were added in three sections to make the upper deck more accessible. The original wooden stadium seats were replaced with wider plastic ones and the upper deck expanded upward nine rows, excluding the walkway. A new upper concourse was built above the old and original concourse exits were closed in by new seating. A new middle tier was built featuring a larger press box and 16 luxury boxes. About one-third of the bleacher seats were eliminated, their middle section converted to a blacked-out batter's eye. A wall was built behind the bleachers blocking the views from Gerard Avenue and the elevated subway platform above River Avenue. On this wall, the Yankees erected the first instant replay display in baseball, referred to in literature as a "telescreen". All told, the Stadium was reduced to a listed capacity of 57,545. The Stadium's playing field was drastically altered. "Death Valley" was reduced by more than 40 feet (12 m) while the right-field home-run porch was moved out. Monuments once in play were moved to a newly created Monument Park. In 1985, the left field fence was moved in and the stadium assumed its final dimensions in 1988. Although it was essentially the same structure, the renovations were significant enough that some sources consider them two different stadiums. The ESPN Sports Almanac, for instance, calls the original stadium "Yankee Stadium I" and the renovated stadium "Yankee Stadium II".

On April 13, 1998, an 18-inch (46 cm) long beam fell onto a seat before a scheduled game causing the postponement of two games and the relocation of a third to nearby Shea Stadium while the stadium was inspected.

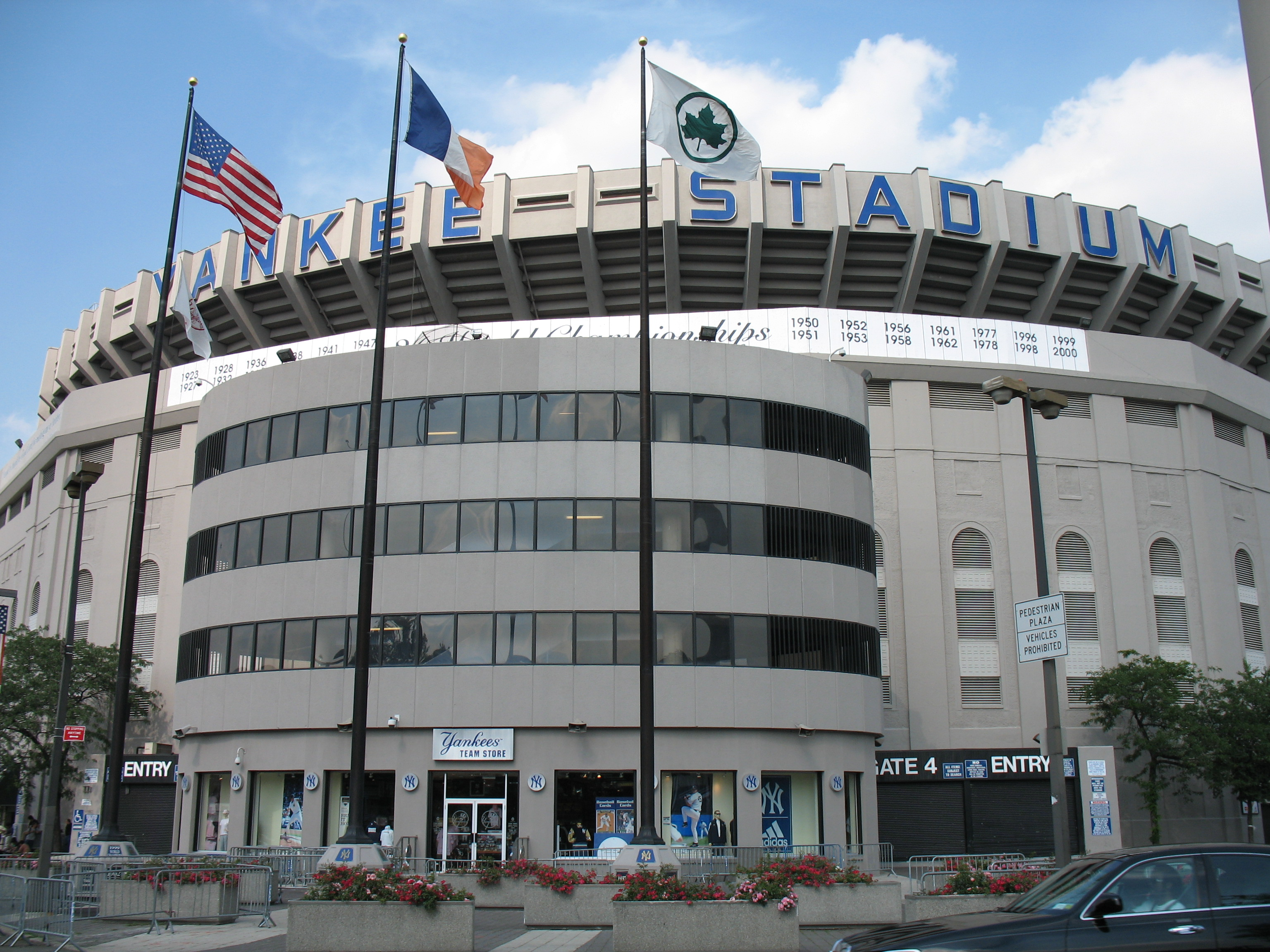
The post-renovation exterior of the stadium, as it appeared in 2006.

=== Replacement, closing, and demolition ===
Logo to commemorate the stadium's last season.

After years of speculation that the Yankees would build a new stadium to replace Yankee Stadium, construction began on August 16, 2006, with a groundbreaking ceremony across the street in Macombs Dam Park. The Yankees played their final two seasons in the stadium in 2007 and 2008 while the new venue was being built.

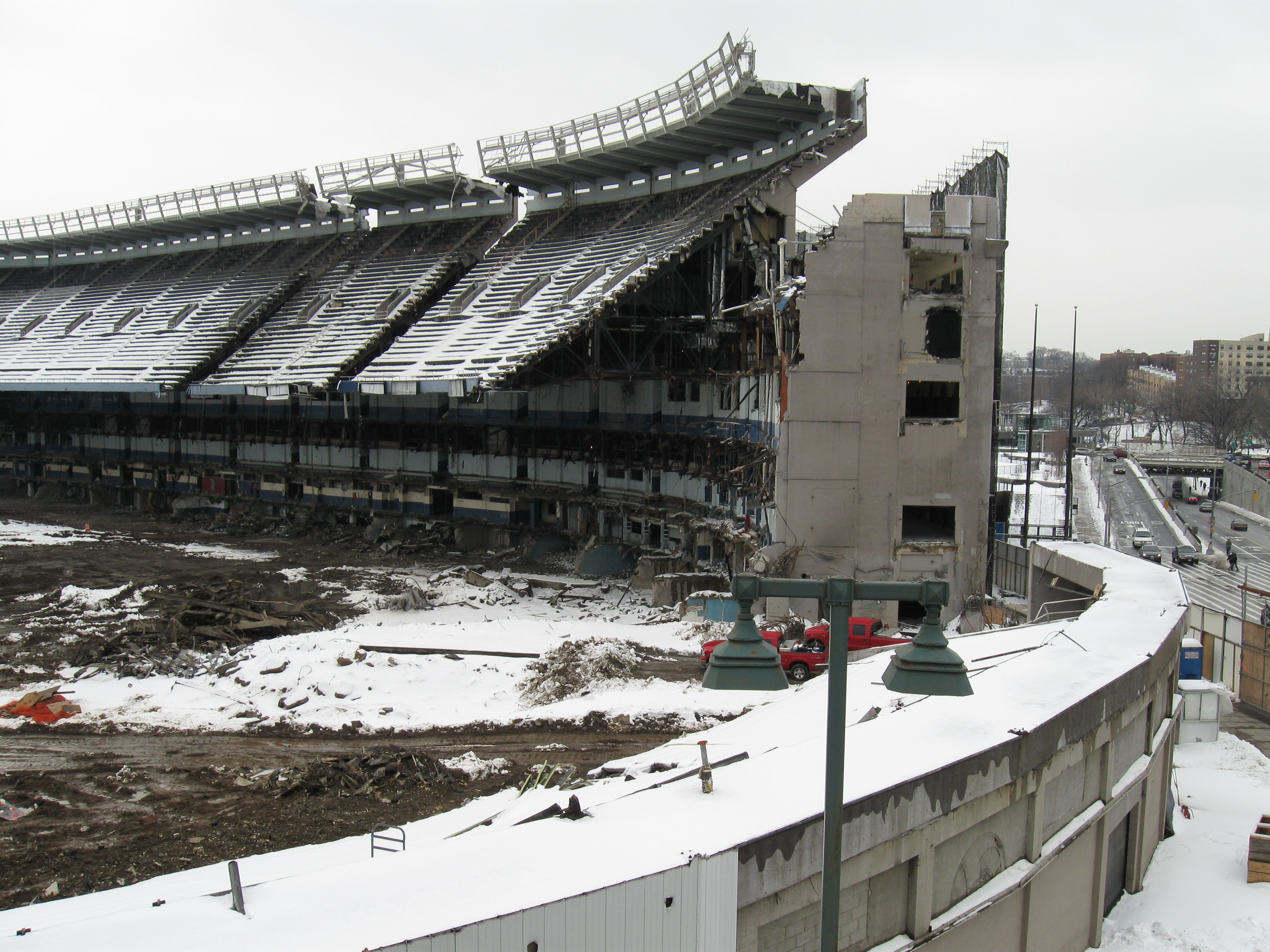

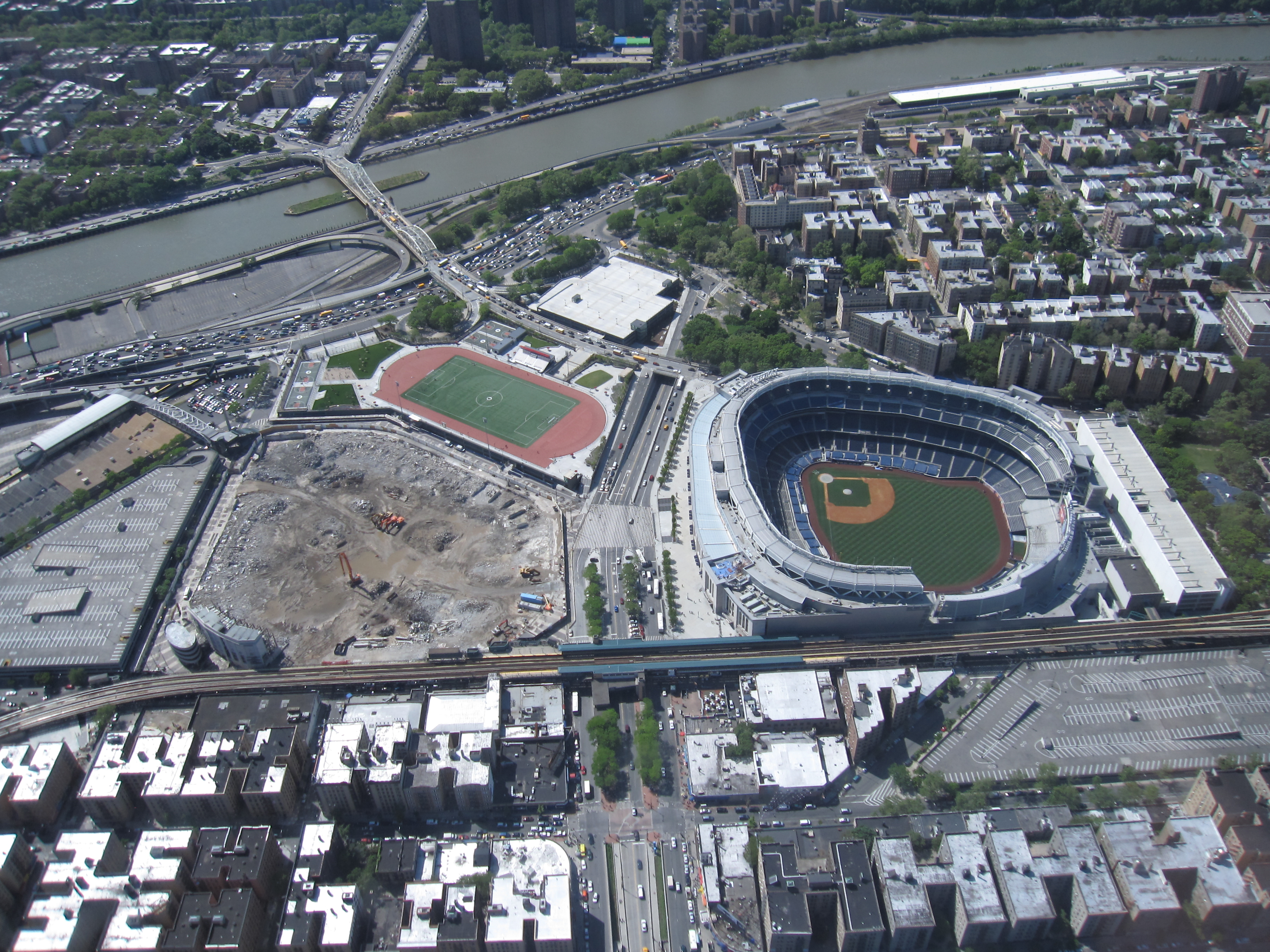
Demolition in February 2010 (top), and 3 months later, the remains of the original stadium (middle left) next to the new Yankee Stadium (middle right)

After the final game in Yankee Stadium's history was played on September 21, 2008, public tours of Yankee Stadium continued until November 23, 2008. November 9, 2008 was the last day the public tours included Monument Park and the retired number area. On November 12, 2008, construction workers began removing memorials from Monument Park for relocation to the new facility. On November 8, 2008, former Yankees Scott Brosius, Paul O'Neill, David Cone and Jeff Nelson, all members of the 1998 World Series championship team, joined 60 children from two Bronx based youth groups Youth Force 2020 and the ACE Mentor Program in ceremoniously digging up home plate, the pitcher's mound pitching plate (rubber) and the surrounding dirt of both areas and transporting them to comparable areas of new Yankee Stadium.

An official closing ceremony was reportedly discussed to occur in November 2008, but was scrapped when the organization decided the final event should be a baseball game. Yankee officials said that while the team had contemplated a final ceremony (with any proceeds going to charity), talk of a concert was just media speculation.

The front office staff vacated the premises on January 23, 2009. Demolition began in March 2009 with the removal of the playing field. On May 13, 2009, the process of removing seats began and was completed on June 8. On September 3 and 4, the iconic white facade was dismantled.

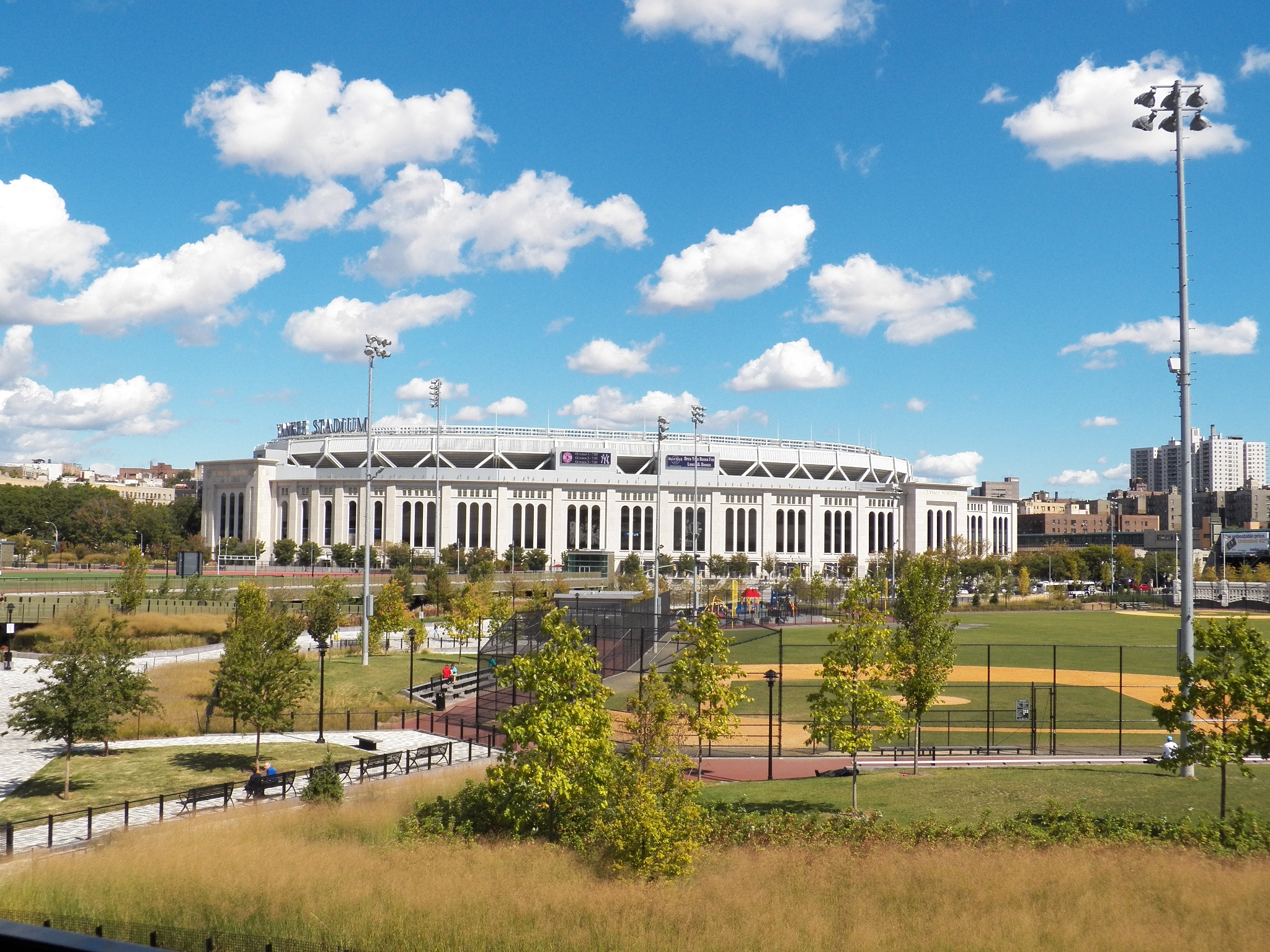
Heritage Field in 2012, with the new Yankee Stadium in background

On November 4, 2009, construction workers began dismantling the outfield bleachers. On November 12, demolition work began on the field level grandstand. By the end of November, most of the grandstand and bleachers at field level were gone. By the first week of December, demolition of the midlevel loge seats had begun. By January 2010, the loge level was gone and demolition began on the left field escalator bank adjacent to Gate 2. In February 2010, demolition work began on the upper deck and the outfield wall; the final part of the outfield wall (the Continental Airlines ad, the out-of-town scoreboard and the remaining part of the advertising panel to its right) was taken down February 24, 2010. By March 25, the entire upper deck was taken down.

Following an unsuccessful attempt to save Gate 2 (the only portion of the original Yankee Stadium that mostly remained unaltered after the venue's renovation), demolition of the outer walls of the stadium began on March 29. Demolition of the original Yankee Stadium was completed on May 13, 2010.

A 10-acre (40,000 m^{2}) park complex called Heritage Field was constructed on the old stadium site, accounting for 40% of the original parkland that is now occupied by the new Stadium. The groundbreaking ceremony for Heritage Field took place on June 29, 2010. Heritage Field was officially opened in April 2012. At its opening, a blue outline showing the location of the original Yankee Stadium diamond was interwoven into the grass, showing that second base on the new field is at the approximate location of home plate of the original diamond.

== Features ==
=== Design ===
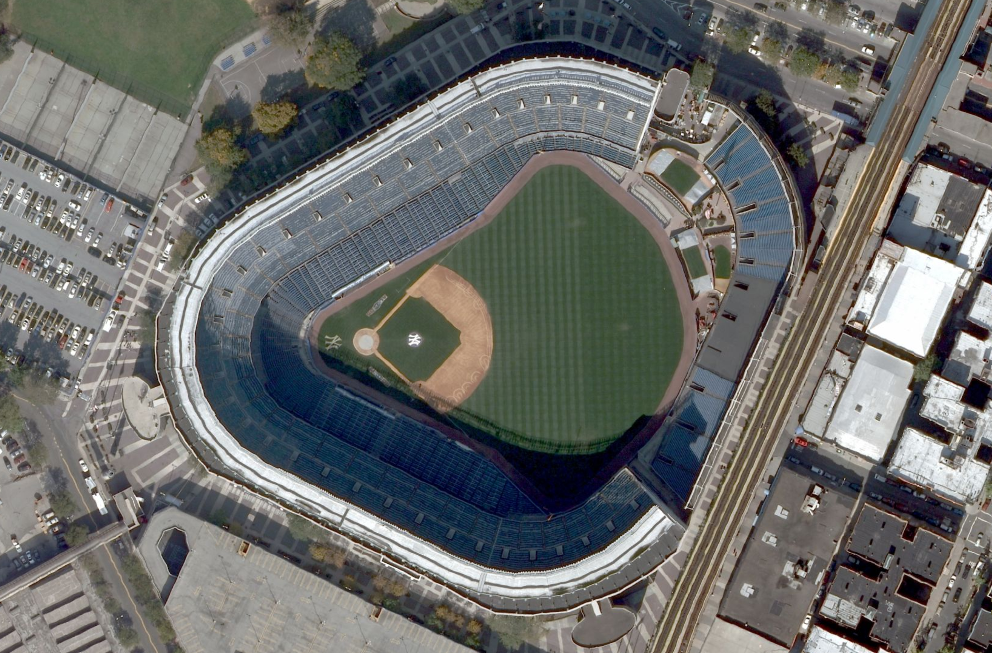
An aerial view of Yankee Stadium shows the asymmetrical shape of the venue.

Yankee Stadium was the first three-tiered sports facility in the United States and one of the first baseball venues to be given the lasting title of stadium. The word stadium deliberately evoked ancient Greece, where a stade was a unit of measure—the length of a footrace; the buildings that housed these footraces were called stadia. Yankee Stadium was one of the first to be designed with the intent to be a multi-purpose facility. The field was initially surrounded by a (misshapen) 0.25-mile (0.40 km) running track, which effectively also served as a "warning track" for outfielders, the first in baseball, a feature now standard on all professional and major league fields. The left and right field bleacher sections were laid out roughly at a right angle to the third base stands, to be properly positioned for both track-and-field events and football. The large electronic scoreboard in right-center field, featuring both teams' lineups and scores of other baseball games, was the first of its kind.

As Yankee Stadium owed its creation largely to Ruth, its design partially accommodated the game's left-handed-hitting slugger. Initially the fence was 295 feet (90 m) from home plate down the right-field line, referred to as the "short porch" and 350 feet (110 m) to near right field, compared with 490 feet (150 m) to the deepest part of center field, nicknamed "Death Valley". The right-field bleachers were appropriately nicknamed "Ruthville". Although the right field fences were eventually pushed back after the 1974–1975 renovations, they were still relatively close to home plate and retained the "short porch" moniker, favoring future Yankee lefty sluggers such as Graig Nettles and Reggie Jackson. There is an urban legend that the stadium's field level was several feet below sea level, but that is easily disproven by observing how much higher the stadium site was (and is) than the level of the nearby Harlem River. The altitude of the old ballpark's site is 55 feet (17 m) above sea level.

=== Monument Park ===
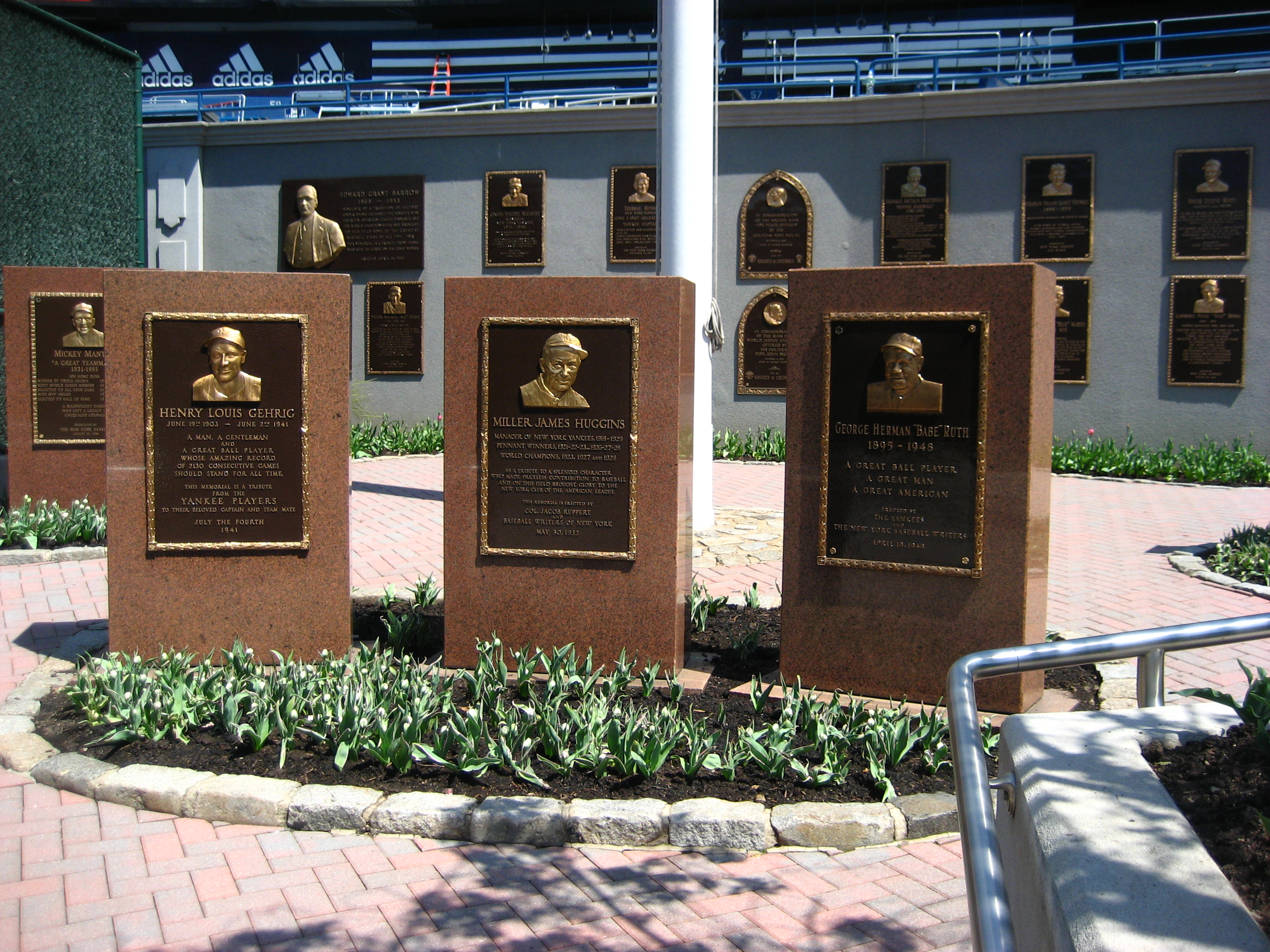
Monument Park featured monuments and plaques dedicated to Yankee greats.

Monument Park was an open-air museum that contained the Yankees' retired numbers, as well as a collection of monuments and plaques honoring distinguished members of the New York Yankees. It was located beyond the left-center field fences, near the bullpens.

The origins of Monument Park can be traced to the original three monuments of Lou Gehrig, Miller Huggins and Babe Ruth that once used to stand in-play in center field. Over the years, the Yankees continued to honor players and personnel with additional monuments and plaques. After the 1974–1975 renovations of Yankee Stadium, the outfield fence was moved in, enclosing the monuments and plaques on the old fence and creating "Monument Park". A visual collection of retired numbers was soon added to this location. Monument Park remained there until the stadium's closing in 2008; after the new Yankee Stadium opened, the retired numbers, plaques, and monuments were moved into a new Monument Park in the new ballpark.

=== Façade ===
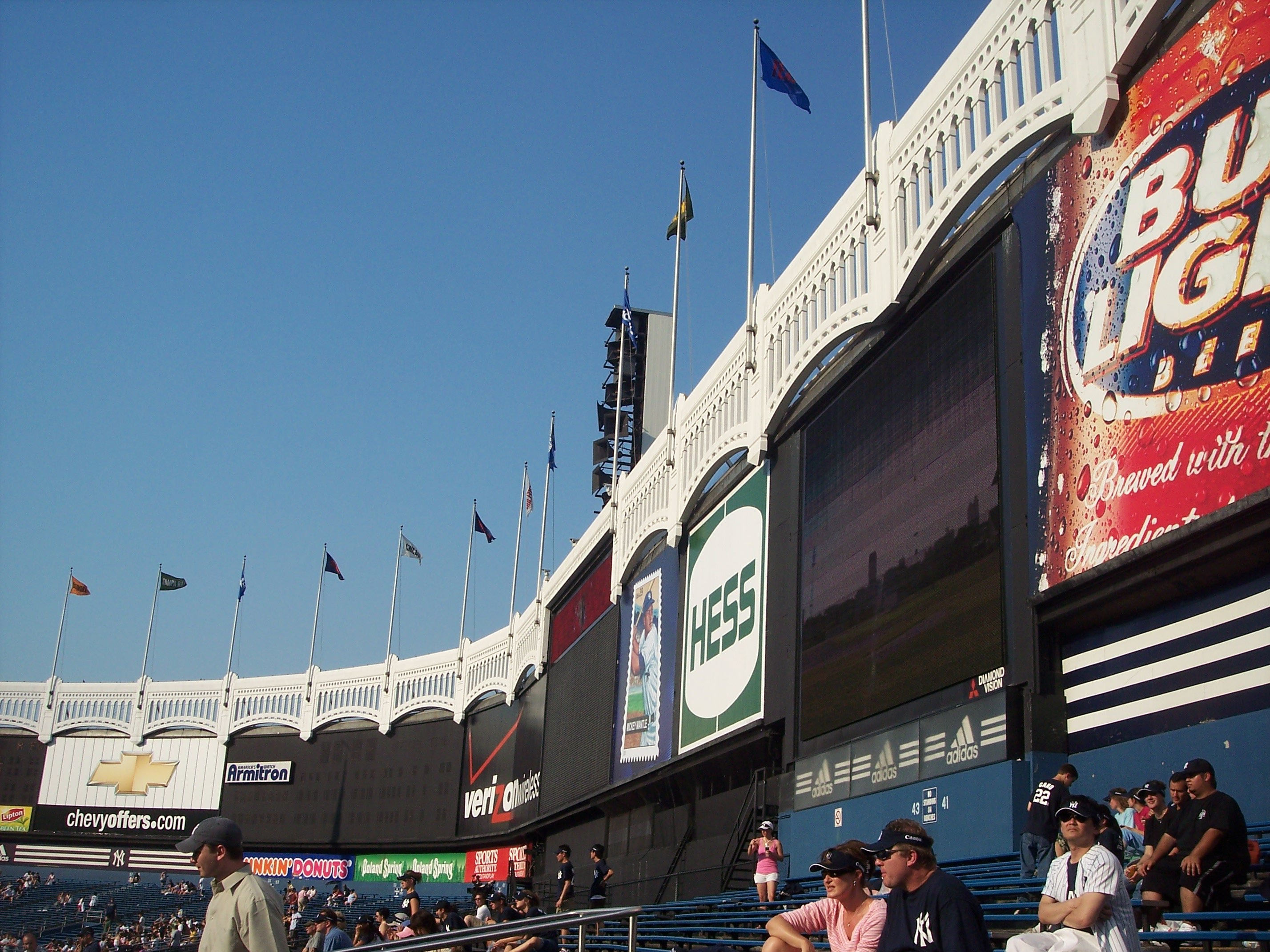
The façade over the wall behind the bleachers

One of the most distinguishing characteristics of Yankee Stadium was the façade, which consisted of a copper frieze that originally ran along the front of the roof of the triple-decked grandstand. The copper frieze developed a green patina over time until it was painted white during the 1960s. After the 1970s renovation, it ran a shorter distance, restricted to the top of the bleacher billboards and scoreboard.

Until the September 30, 1973 – April 14, 1976 renovation, the Yankees' American League championship pennants hung from the frieze. Tony Morante, who was in charge of tours at the Stadium, found most of these pennants in a box in 2004 and brought them to team executives to have them restored for display at the new Stadium.

The YES Network uses the frieze in its graphics. It was incorporated into the logo for the 2008 All-Star Game held at the Stadium. It is also used around the main grandstand at the team's spring training facility, which has the post-reconstruction dimensions.

=== Outfield dimensions ===
During its 87-year existence, Yankee Stadium's dimensions were changed several times. The many photographs taken throughout the stadium's history serve as references, especially as the Yankees were among the first to post distance markers on the outfield walls, doing so beginning in 1928. New York newspapers also provided detailed information on changes to the stadium and its field dimensions.

In its original 1923 incarnation, the left field foul line hit the box seat railing at a distance of 257 feet 1 inch (78.36 m), the right field foul line length was 257 feet 6 inches (78.49 m), and the deepest part of center field was reported as 498 feet (152 m).

The short foul lines did not pose too much of a problem for pitchers, as the seating angled away sharply, especially in left field. The right field corner was a problem for the outfielders, as its construction tended to make a bounding fair ball take an unpredictable carom.

This problem, dubbed the "bloody angle" by the players, was solved prior to the 1924 season by moving the infield about ten feet toward center and rotating it slightly to the right. That resulted in a new left field distance of 281 feet 1 inch (85.67 m), and a new right field of 294 feet 6 inches (89.76 m) (eventually posted as 295). The deepest part of center field was eventually labeled as 490 feet. These changes also made the sun angles less extreme for the fielders.

By 1928 some of the box seats had been chiseled away in the left field corner, allowing a somewhat longer foul line distance of 301 feet (92 m). The seating curved away sharply and the far corner of the lower left stand was 402 feet (123 m) away. The large wooden bleachers remained well out of reach to most batters hitting toward left and center fields. In 1928 the deep left-center field corner was marked as 490 feet (150 m), with the deep right-center field corner 429 feet (131 m). For 1928 only, there was also a marker of 462 feet (141 m), in direct center field. The "straightaway" right field distance (at an exit gate) was marked 350 feet (110 m) and the right field foul line 295 feet (90 m). The right field area would remain the only hitter-friendly portion of the outfield before its 1970s remodeling.

When the wooden bleachers were replaced by a concrete structure during the 1936 season, its left corner (now aligned with the main stand) was marked as 415 feet (126 m). Deep left center shrank to a mere 461 feet (141 m), behind the flagpole. As the monuments began to accumulate, the 461 sign was moved a few feet to the right. The deep right-center corner was 407 feet (124 m), the right corner of the bleacher area was 367 feet (112 m), and the right field line 296 feet (90 m), with a 344 feet (105 m) sign about halfway between them. For the 1939 season, a 457 feet (139 m) sign was added to left-center's "Death Valley", between the 402/415 pair and the 461.

The 415 sign in deep left field appears in clips of Al Gionfriddo's catch of Joe DiMaggio's long drive in the 1947 World Series. That sign, and its 367 counterpart in right field, were both covered by auxiliary scoreboards which were built prior to the 1949 season. Those boards displayed the current game inning-by-inning along with runs-hits-errors.

As part of the upgrade for the 1967 season, the 461 marker was replaced by one reading 463 feet (141 m), and a 433 feet (132 m) marker was added for direct center field.

When the stadium reopened in 1976, the distance in straight-away center field was 417 feet (127 m). The deepest part of the outfield was in left center at 430 feet (130 m). The most recent field dimensions were reached primarily by moving the Yankee bullpen to left-center from right and making a few other changes so as to bring the left-center field wall in. The 1973-era left-center field wall locations could still be seen in 1976, as this is where the outfield bleacher seats began.

The following is a partial list of the stadium's dimensions throughout the years:

| Year | Left Field Line | Straightaway Left Field | Left Center | Deepest Center Field | Right Center | Straightaway Right Field | Right Field Line | Backstop |
|---|---|---|---|---|---|---|---|---|
| 1923 | 257 ft (78 m) | ? | ? | 498 ft (152 m) | ? | ? | 257.5 ft (78.5 m) | ? |
| 1924 | 281 ft (86 m) | 395 ft (120 m) | 460 ft (140 m) | 490 ft (150 m) | 429 ft (131 m) | 350 ft (110 m) | 295 ft (90 m) | 82 ft (25 m) |
| 1937 | 301 ft (92 m) | 402 ft (123 m) / 415 ft (126 m). | 457 ft (139 m) | 461 ft (141 m) | 407 ft (124 m) | 367 ft (112 m) / 344 ft (105 m). | 296 ft (90 m) | 82 ft (25 m) |
| 1976 | 312 ft (95 m) | 387 ft (118 m) | 430 ft (130 m) | 417 ft (127 m) | 385 ft (117 m) | 353 ft (108 m) | 310 ft (94 m) | 84 ft (26 m) |
| 1985 | 312 ft (95 m) | 379 ft (116 m) | 411 ft (125 m) | 410 ft (120 m) | 385 ft (117 m) | 353 ft (108 m) | 310 ft (94 m) | 84 ft (26 m) |
| 1988 | 318 ft (97 m) | 379 ft (116 m) | 399 ft (122 m) | 408 ft (124 m) | 385 ft (117 m) | 353 ft (108 m) | 314 ft (96 m) | 82 ft (25 m) |

After a mid-1960s remodeling, the 461 marker was replaced by a 463 marker slightly farther to the left of the pair of double doors and a 433 marker was added between the 463 and 407 markers ostensibly to represent true straightaway center field (being roughly at the midpoint of the batter's-eye screen).

== Legacy, traditions and mainstays ==
=== Bob Sheppard ===
From 1951 through 2007, Bob Sheppard was the public address announcer at Yankee Stadium. His distinctive voice (Yankee legend Reggie Jackson has called him "the Voice of God") and the way he announced players for over half a century made him a part of the lore of the stadium and the team. Before a player's first at-bat of the game, Sheppard announced his position, his uniform number, his name, and his uniform number again. Example: "Now batting for the Yankees, the shortstop, number 2, Derek Jeter, Number 2." For each following at-bat, Sheppard announced just the position and name: "The shortstop, Derek Jeter." Due to health reasons, 96-year-old Sheppard announced his last game on September 5, 2007. He did sign a new two-year contract with the Yankees in March 2008 but lacked the strength necessary to do the job and missed the entire 2008 season, including the 2008 All-Star Game, which was played at Yankee Stadium. He could not announce the final game at the old stadium in September 2008, but recorded a video address that was played during the pregame ceremonies and also recorded the lineups for the game. He officially announced his retirement after the 2009 season. Sheppard died in July 2010. Following Sheppard's death, Derek Jeter used Sheppard's recorded announcement for his at-bats at Yankee Stadium until the end of his career.

=== Hammond Organ ===
The Hammond Organ was installed at Yankee Stadium in 1967 and was primarily played by Eddie Layton from its introduction until his retirement after the 2003 season. The playing of the organ has added to the character of the stadium for many years, playing before games, introducing players, during the national anthem and the rendition of "Take me out to the ball game" during the seventh-inning stretch. After Layton's retirement, he got to pick his replacement, Paul Cartier. In recent years, the use of the organ has been decreased in favor of recorded music between innings and introducing players. Since the 2004 season, the national anthem has rarely been performed by the organists, opting for military recordings of the Star Spangled Banner. In 2005, a new Hammond Elegante was installed replacing the original Hammond Colonnade.

=== Music ===
One of the most famous traditions for Yankee Stadium was playing Frank Sinatra's version of the "Theme from New York, New York" over the loudspeakers after every home win, since 1980. Sinatra's version was played after Yankees wins, whereas Liza Minnelli's was played after Yankee losses.

After the September 11 attacks, all American Major League Baseball stadiums started playing "God Bless America" during the seventh-inning stretch for the remainder of the 2001 season. Many teams ceased this practice the following season, although it has continued in postseason events at many cities and become a tradition at Yankee Stadium alongside '"Take Me Out to the Ballgame". Usually, a recording of "God Bless America" by Kate Smith was played, although sometimes there was a live performance by Irish tenor Ronan Tynan. For part of the 2005 season, the Yankees used a recording of Tynan, but the Smith version was reinstated due to fan complaints about the long duration of the Tynan version. The tradition of playing Smith's version continued in the new stadium until April 2019, when accusations surfaced that some of her other songs contained racist lyrics. For the final game at Yankee Stadium, Tynan performed "God Bless America" live, including the rarely heard introduction to the song (which Tynan included every time he performed the song at a Yankees game). "God Bless America" was later played on the organ at the new stadium, and currently, Robert Merrill's rendition of the song of played.

When the Yankees scored a run, a version of the Westminster chime played as the last player to score in the at-bat gets to home plate. The version of the chime is the beginning of "Workaholic" by the music group 2 Unlimited. When the Yankees' closer Mariano Rivera entered a game, he was accompanied by Metallica's "Enter Sandman". Since 1996, the Yankees' World Series championships were celebrated with the playing of Queen's "We Are the Champions" followed by Frank Sinatra's "New York, New York".

=== Meeting at "the bat" ===
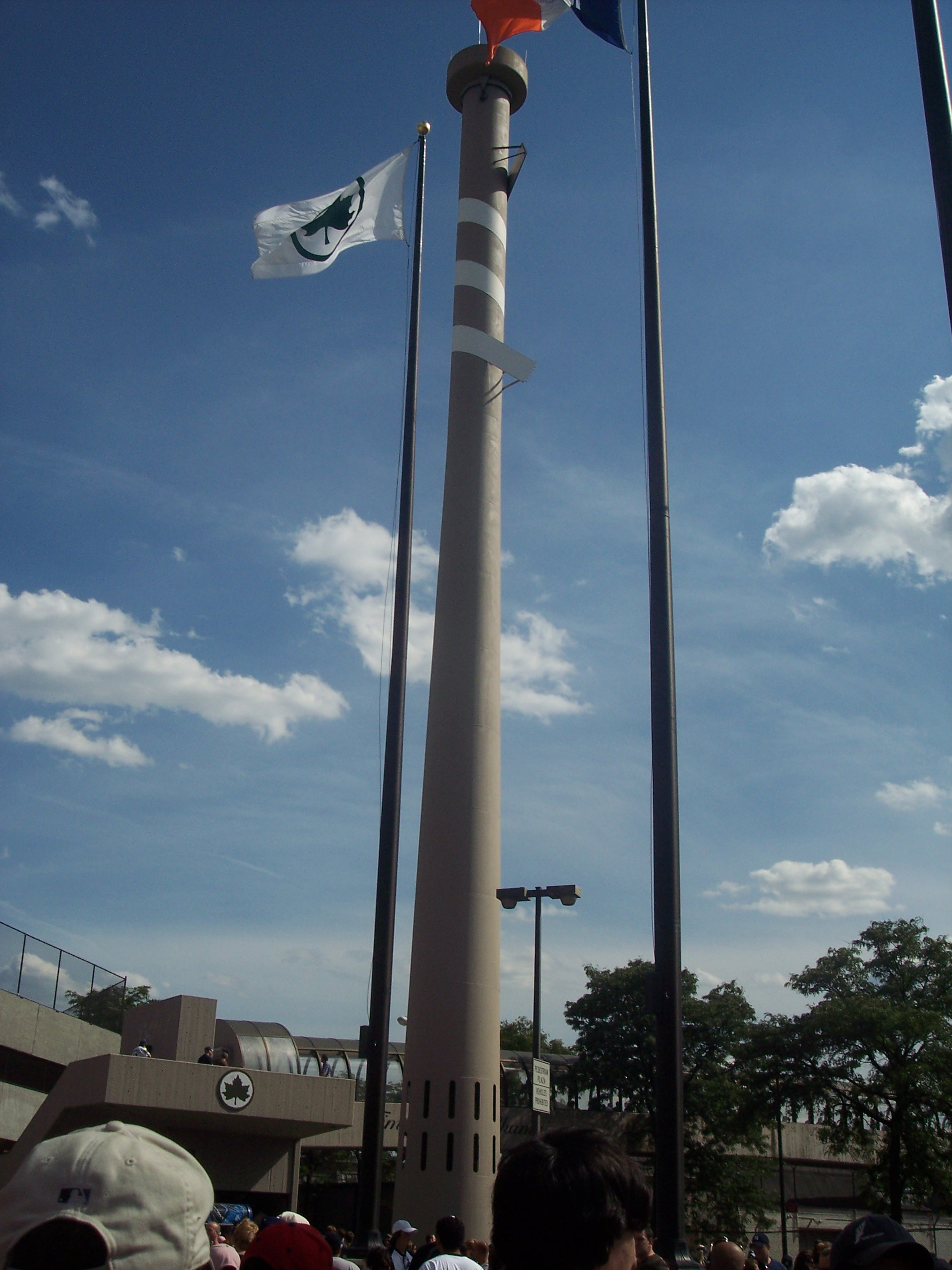
The Louisville Slugger-shaped exhaust pipe

Outside the stadium's main entrance gate stands a 138-foot (42 m) tall exhaust pipe in the shape of a baseball bat, complete with tape at the handle that frays off at the end. It is sponsored by Hillerich & Bradsby, makers of the famous Louisville Slugger line of baseball bats, which is specifically designed to look like a Babe Ruth model. As the most prominent feature on the stadium's exterior, recognizable even to first-time visitors, the bat was often used as a designated meeting spot for fans to meet their ticket holding friends before entering the stadium.

The "Bat" continues to stand outside the Metro North Station, built in 2009. A 450-foot (140 m) long pedestrian walkway and its staircase meet at the "bat".

=== Roll call ===
Beginning in the 1990s and after the first pitch was thrown at the top of the first inning, the "Bleacher Creatures" in Section 39, usually led by a man nicknamed Bald Vinny, began chanting the names of every player in the defensive lineup (except the pitcher and catcher, with some rare exceptions), starting with the center fielder. They did not stop chanting the player's name until he acknowledged the Creatures (usually with a wave or a point), who then moved on to the next player. Other names called out during roll call from time to time have included Yankee broadcasters John Sterling and Michael Kay or Aaron Boone, Bucky Dent and Babe Ruth when the Yankees hosted the rival Boston Red Sox. Sometimes, after a long rain delay, the Creatures started another Roll Call for comedic effect. Often when a player was replaced in the field, their replacement was also welcomed with a chant. In 2008, center fielder Melky Cabrera booted a routine grounder while attempting to wave to the fans.

== Stadium usage ==
=== Baseball ===
In its 86 years of existence, Yankee Stadium hosted 6,581 regular season home games for the Yankees. Only Fenway Park (Boston), Wrigley Field (Chicago), Sportsman's Park (St. Louis), and Tiger Stadium (Detroit) have hosted more games. Due to the Yankees' frequent appearances in the World Series, Yankee Stadium played host to 161 postseason games, more than any other stadium in baseball history. The Stadium hosted 37 of the 83 possible World Series during its existence (not counting 1974–75, and the 1994 strike), with the Yankees winning 26 of them. In total, the venue hosted 100 World Series games.

16 of the 17 World Series won in the Bronx were clinched at the 1923 Yankee Stadium, nine by the Yankees and seven by their opponents:

- Yankees, in 1927, 1938, 1947, 1950, 1951, 1953, 1977, 1996 and 1999
- St. Louis Cardinals, in 1926 and 1942
- Brooklyn Dodgers, in 1955, the only World Championship won by the Dodgers before moving to Los Angeles.
- Milwaukee Braves, in 1957, the only World Series won by a Milwaukee team.
- Cincinnati Reds, in 1976
- Los Angeles Dodgers, in 1981
- Florida Marlins, in 2003

The Yankees won their first 26 World Series championships while playing in Yankee Stadium, with their 27th coming in the first year of playing at its namesake replacement (2009).

Perhaps the most memorable moment in the venue's history came on July 4, 1939, designated as "Lou Gehrig Appreciation Day". Gehrig, forced out of action permanently by amyotrophic lateral sclerosis (ALS) and facing his impending death, gave a legendary farewell speech thanking his fans and colleagues for making him "the luckiest man on the face of the earth".

Many memorable and historic games have been played at Yankee Stadium. Three out of the four perfect games thrown by Yankee pitchers have occurred at the Stadium. Don Larsen threw a perfect game on October 8, 1956, in the fifth game of the World Series, while David Wells and David Cone threw theirs on May 17, 1998, and July 18, 1999, respectively. (Domingo Germán threw his June 28, 2023 perfect game in Oakland.) No-hitters were thrown by Monte Pearson, Bob Feller, Allie Reynolds, Virgil Trucks, Dave Righetti, Jim Abbott, Dwight Gooden and a combination of six Houston Astros pitchers in one game.

The Stadium was the site of a nationally televised game on August 6, 1979, the same day as the funeral for departed Yankees captain Thurman Munson. The team attended the funeral in Canton, Ohio earlier in the day and flew to New York for an emotional game. Bobby Murcer drove in all five runs for the Yankees, including a game winning two-run single that defeated the Baltimore Orioles 5–4.

Many historic home runs have been hit at Yankee Stadium. Babe Ruth hit the ballpark's first home run on its Opening Day in 1923. Ruth also set the then-league record for most home runs in a single season by hitting his 60th home run in 1927. Roger Maris would later break this record in 1961 at Yankee Stadium on the final day of the season by hitting his 61st home run. In 1967, Mickey Mantle slugged his 500th career home run. Chris Chambliss won the 1976 ALCS by hitting a "walk-off" home run in which thousands of fans ran onto the field as Chambliss circled the bases. A year later, in the 1977 World Series, Reggie Jackson hit three home runs on three consecutive pitches in the championship-clinching Game 6. In 1983, the Pine Tar Incident involving George Brett occurred; Brett's go-ahead home run in the ninth inning of the game was overturned for his bat having too much pine tar, resulting in him furiously charging out of the dugout. In Game 1 of the 1996 ALCS, Derek Jeter hit a fly ball to right-field that was interfered with by fan Jeffrey Maier but ruled a home run. In Game 7 of the 2003 ALCS, Aaron Boone hit an extra-inning "walk-off" home run to send the Yankees to the World Series. The Red Sox would get revenge coming back from 3-0 and beating their rivals in Yankee Stadium the following year. On August 6, 2007, Alex Rodriguez hit his 500th home run against the Kansas City Royals at the Stadium. José Molina hit the ballpark's last home run in its final game on September 21, 2008.

In 2001, six weeks after the September 11 attacks, Yankee Stadium hosted an emotional three games in the World Series. For Game 3, President George W. Bush hurled the ceremonial first pitch, throwing a strike. In Game 4, Tino Martinez hit a game-tying home run off Arizona Diamondbacks closer Byung-hyun Kim with two outs in the ninth inning. Derek Jeter hit the winning "walk-off" home run in extra innings off Kim, earning himself the nickname "Mr. November". The following night in Game 5, the Yankees replicated their heroics from the previous night; Scott Brosius hit a game-tying home run off Kim with two outs in the bottom of the ninth inning en route to a win.

==== All-Star Games ====
On July 11, 1939, Major League Baseball held its seventh All-Star Game at Yankee Stadium, in concert with the World's Fair being held at Flushing-Meadows in Queens. Yankees manager Joe McCarthy loaded his American League team with pinstripes: Bill Dickey (catcher), Joe DiMaggio (outfield), Joe Gordon (second base), Red Rolfe (third base), George Selkirk (outfield) and Red Ruffing (pitcher) were all in the starting lineup. Reserve players included Frank Crosetti (shortstop), Lou Gehrig (first base), Lefty Gomez (pitcher) and Johnny Murphy (pitcher). The American League won, 3–1, behind a home run by DiMaggio, in front of more than 62,000. This was the second All-Star Game held in New York; the Polo Grounds had hosted the event in 1934.

From 1959 to 1962, Major League Baseball held two All-Star Games each year. On July 13, 1960, Yankee Stadium hosted baseball's second All-Star Game in three days. The National League won both games. In the latter game, Whitey Ford was the starting pitcher. Yogi Berra (catcher), Mickey Mantle (outfield), Roger Maris (outfield) and Bill Skowron (first base) were in the starting lineup; Jim Coates (pitcher) and Elston Howard (catcher) were reserves. The National League won the Yankee Stadium game, 6–0, tying a record with four home runs, including one by hometown favorite Willie Mays. The 38,000 fans who attended the game also saw the Red Sox' Ted Williams in his final All-Star appearance.

Showcasing its new renovation, Yankee Stadium hosted the All-Star Game on July 19, 1977. With the Yankees defending their 1976 pennant, Billy Martin managed the American League team on his home field. The National League won its sixth consecutive All-Star Game, 7–5, in front of more than 56,000 fans; the senior circuit's streak would reach 11. Reggie Jackson (outfield) and Willie Randolph (second base) started for the American League; Sparky Lyle (pitcher), Thurman Munson (catcher) and Graig Nettles (third base) also made the team. Jim Palmer was the game's starting pitcher because Nolan Ryan refused to play when Martin asked him.

In honor of its final year of existence, in July 2008, Yankee Stadium hosted 2008 All-Star Game festivities. The Yankees were represented by Derek Jeter, Alex Rodriguez and Mariano Rivera. In the Home Run Derby, Josh Hamilton set a single-round record with 28 home runs in the first round. At one point, he hit 13 straight home runs, many of which landed in the stadium's upper deck and deep into the right field bleachers, spurring the crowd to chant his name. Minnesota Twins first baseman Justin Morneau won the competition defeating Hamilton in the final round. The following evening, the American League won the 2008 All-Star Game 4–3 in 15 innings. Michael Young hit the game winning sacrifice fly in the 15th inning off Brad Lidge. The game was the longest in All-Star Game history by time, lasting 4 hours and 50 minutes and tied for the longest in history by innings, tied with the 1967 All-Star Game and was played in front of 55,632 people. J. D. Drew was named game MVP going 2 for 4 with a home run and two RBIs.

==== Final game, 2008 ====
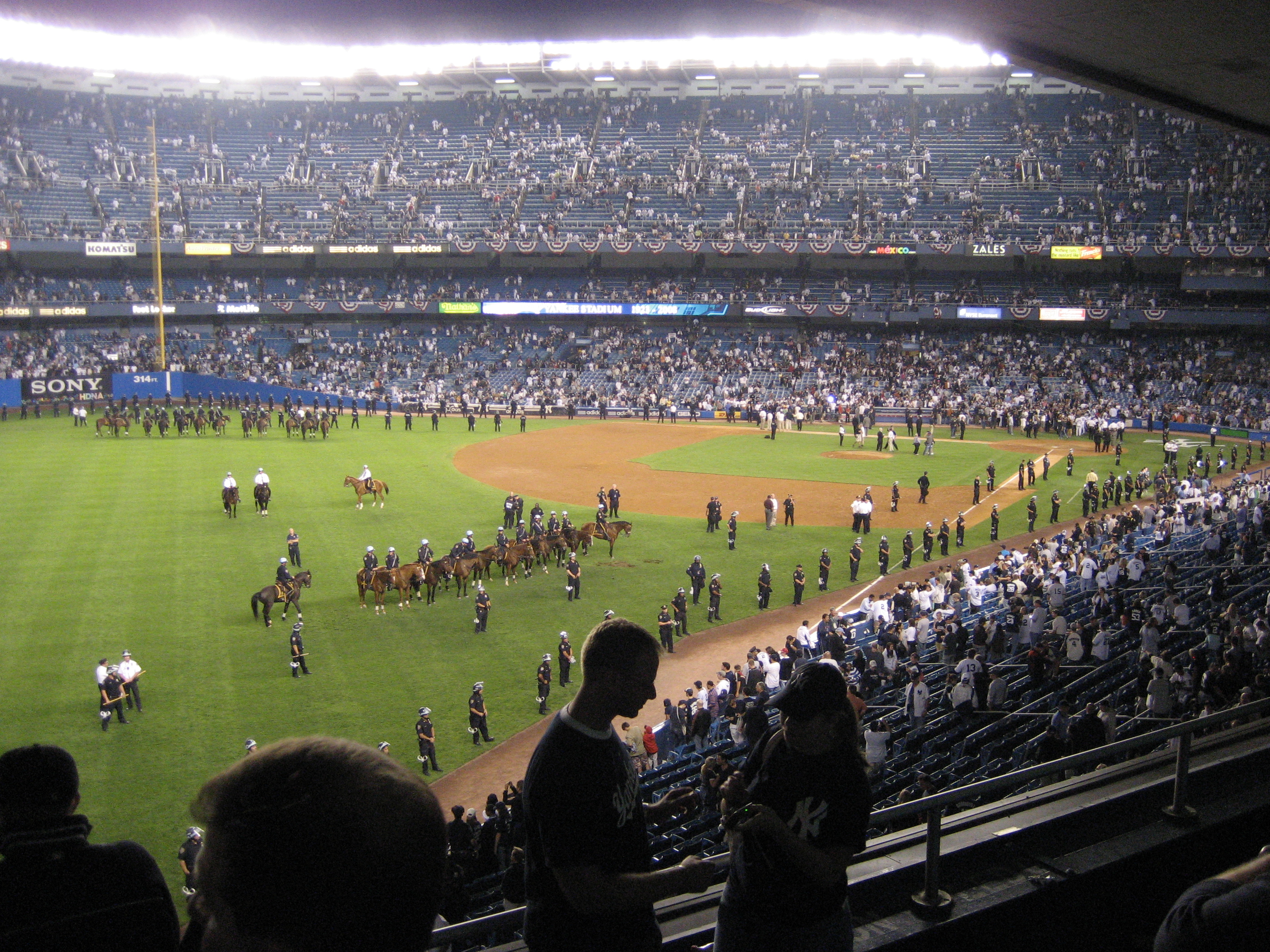
Yankee Stadium after the last game was played on September 21, 2008.

Yankee Stadium hosted its final baseball game on September 21, 2008. The ceremonies for the final game at Yankee Stadium began with the opening of Monument Park, as well as allowing Yankee fans to walk on the warning track around the field. Many former Yankee greats, including Yogi Berra, Whitey Ford, Reggie Jackson, Bernie Williams, Paul O'Neill, Willie Randolph, Roy White and Chris Chambliss took their positions in the playing field as their names were announced by the legendary Bob Sheppard. Julia Ruth Stevens, daughter of Babe Ruth, threw out the ceremonial first pitch in the final game in "The House That Ruth Built".

With Andy Pettitte as the starting pitcher, the Yankees played their final game at Yankee Stadium against the Baltimore Orioles, recording the final out at 11:43 pm EDT in a 7–3 Yankee victory. Among many lasts to be recorded, a long-time standing question was answered. It was first wondered by Babe Ruth after he hit the first home run in Yankee Stadium on its opening day of April 18, 1923:

I was glad to have hit the first home run in this park. God only knows who will hit the last.

That player turned out to be Yankees backup catcher José Molina, as he hit a go-ahead and eventual game-winning two-run home run in the fourth inning.

Other lasts were Jason Giambi recording the last hit in Yankee Stadium, driving in Brett Gardner, who scored the last run in Yankee Stadium. Mariano Rivera made the final pitch in the stadium with Cody Ransom recording the final out at first base. In the eighth inning, Derek Jeter became the final Yankee to bat in Yankee Stadium.

After the game was over, captain Derek Jeter delivered a speech on the field surrounded by his teammates. In the unplanned speech, Jeter thanked and saluted the fans:

For all of us up here, it's a huge honor to put this uniform on every day and come out here and play. And every member of this organization, past and present, has been calling this place home for eighty-five years. There's a lot of tradition, a lot of history, and a lot of memories.

Now the great thing about memories is you're able to pass it along from generation to generation. And although things are going to change next year, we're going to move across the street, there are a few things with the New York Yankees that never change— its pride, its tradition, and most of all, we have the greatest fans in the world.

And we are relying on you to take the memories from this stadium, add them to the new memories that come at the new Yankee Stadium, and continue to pass them on from generation to generation. So on behalf of the entire organization, we just want to take this moment to salute you, the greatest fans in the world.

Afterwards, the team circled the stadium on the warning track waving to fans and wishing the stadium goodbye.

Line score

| Team | 1 | 2 | 3 | 4 | 5 | 6 | 7 | 8 | 9 | R | H | E |
|---|---|---|---|---|---|---|---|---|---|---|---|---|
| Baltimore | 0 | 1 | 1 | 1 | 0 | 0 | 0 | 0 | 0 | 3 | 7 | 1 |
| New York | 0 | 0 | 3 | 2 | 0 | 0 | 2 | 0 | X | 7 | 9 | 1 |
WP: Andy Pettitte (14–14) LP: Chris Waters (3–4); Home runs: BAL: None; NYY: Johnny Damon (16), Jose Molina (3)

==== Collegiate baseball ====
From 1970 to 1987, the Cape Cod Baseball League (CCBL) played its annual all-star game at various major league stadiums. The games were interleague contests between the CCBL and the Atlantic Collegiate Baseball League (ACBL). The 1970, 1973, 1976 and 1980 games were played at Yankee Stadium. The star of the 1973 contest was game MVP and future major league manager Jim Riggleman. The 1980 game starred future New York Mets all-star pitcher Ron Darling of Yale University. In the game, Darling singled, doubled and homered as the CCBL left fielder, then came on in the final inning to pitch in relief, preserving the CCBL's one-run victory.

=== Boxing ===
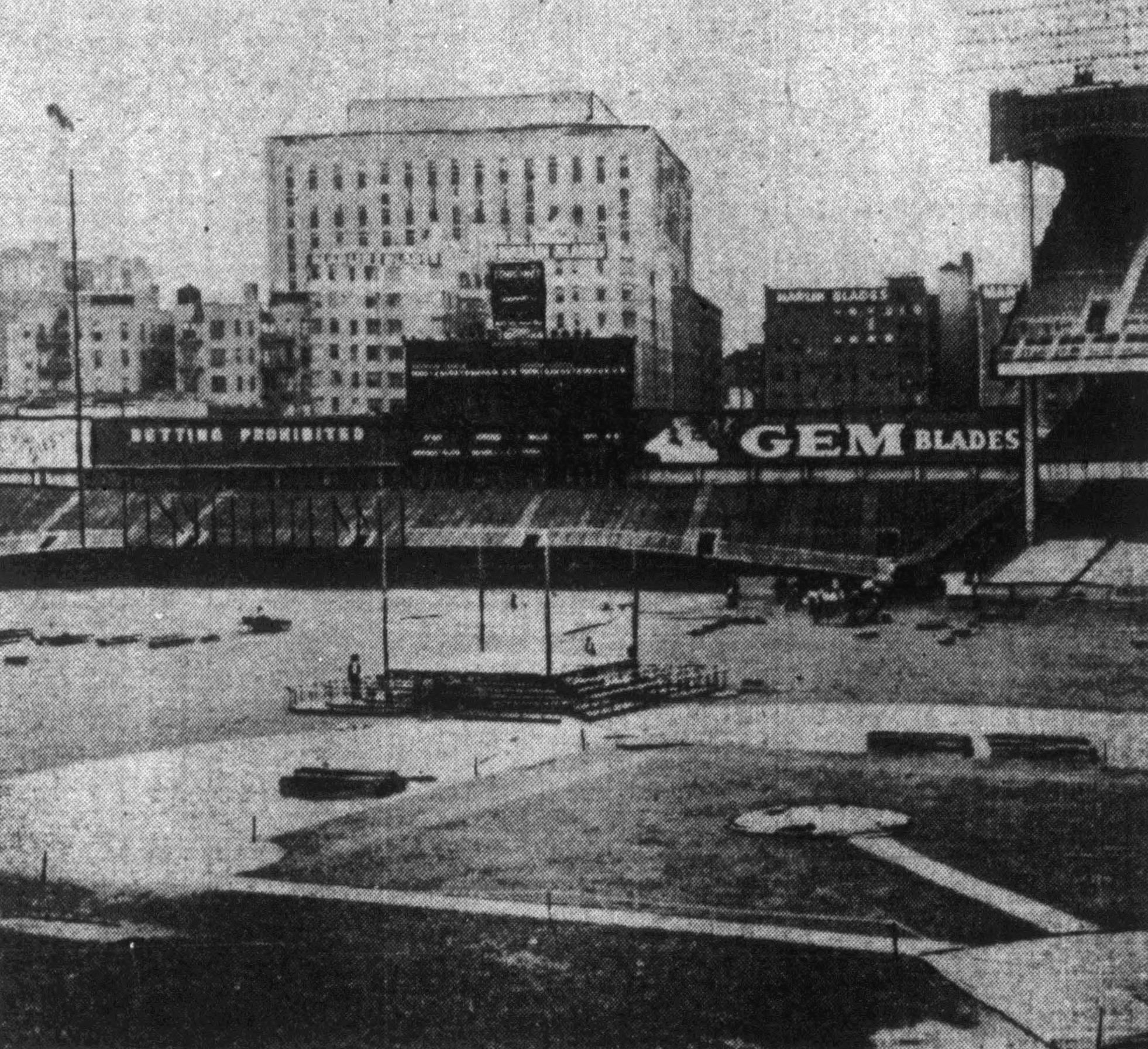
Yankee Stadium being prepared for the boxing match between Joe Louis and Billy Conn in June 1946.

When Yankee Stadium opened in 1923, the Polo Grounds continued to host boxing matches; however, Yankee Stadium was home to prizefighting beginning in its first few months. Benny Leonard retained the lightweight championship in a 15-round decision over Lew Tendler on July 24, 1923, in front of more than 58,000 fans. It was the first of 30 championship bouts to be held at the Stadium. (This excludes dozens of non-title fights.) The boxing ring was placed over second base; a 15-foot (4.6 m) vault contained electrical, telegraph and telephone connections. In July 1927, the aging former heavyweight champion Jack Dempsey came from behind to defeat heavily favored Jack Sharkey by delivering several questionable punches that were deemed illegal. Sharkey had similarly bad luck in a July 1930 heavyweight championship bout at Yankee Stadium, when his knockout punch to Max Schmeling was ruled illegal; Schmeling won by default. In July 1928, Gene Tunney upheld the heavyweight title against Tom Heeney at Yankee Stadium, and then retired as champion.

Perhaps the most famous boxing match ever held at Yankee Stadium was on June 22, 1938, when Joe Louis, an African-American, squared off against Schmeling, a German. Adolf Hitler followed the rematch carefully, imploring Schmeling to defeat Louis, whom Hitler publicly berated. This left some with what they perceived as a moral predicament: root for the black fighter, or for the Nazi. Schmeling had defeated Louis in 1936, but in defense of his title, Louis knocked out Schmeling in the first round. This was one of eight championship fights the "Brown Bomber" fought at Yankee Stadium.

On July 1, 1939, Max Baer defeated Lou Nova at Yankee Stadium, in the first televised boxing match in the United States. The event was broadcast by television station W2XBS, forerunner of WNBC-TV. (The World Series was not televised until 1947.) On September 27, 1946, Tony Zale knocked out New York native Rocky Graziano for the middleweight crown; it was the first of three bouts between Zale and Graziano.

On June 25, 1952, middleweight champion Sugar Ray Robinson sought his third title against light-heavyweight champ Joey Maxim at Yankee Stadium. More than 47,000 saw Robinson outfight Maxim but lose due to heat exhaustion in round 14 (due to the weather that topped 104 °F (40 °C)). The referee who declared Maxim the winner was the second that night; the first had left the fight due to heat exhaustion.

On June 26, 1959, 5-1 Swedish underdog Ingemar Johansson defeated Floyd Patterson at the stadium by stoppage in the third round to become world heavyweight champion.

After its 1970s renovation, Yankee Stadium hosted only one championship fight, primarily as Atlantic City (Philadelphia market) and Las Vegas had taken over as the sites for championship boxing matches. On September 28, 1976, a declining Muhammad Ali defended his heavyweight crown against Ken Norton. To that point, Norton was one of only two boxers who had beaten Ali (in 1973); this was their third and final meeting. Norton led for most of the fight, but Ali improved in the later rounds to win by unanimous decision.

=== College football ===
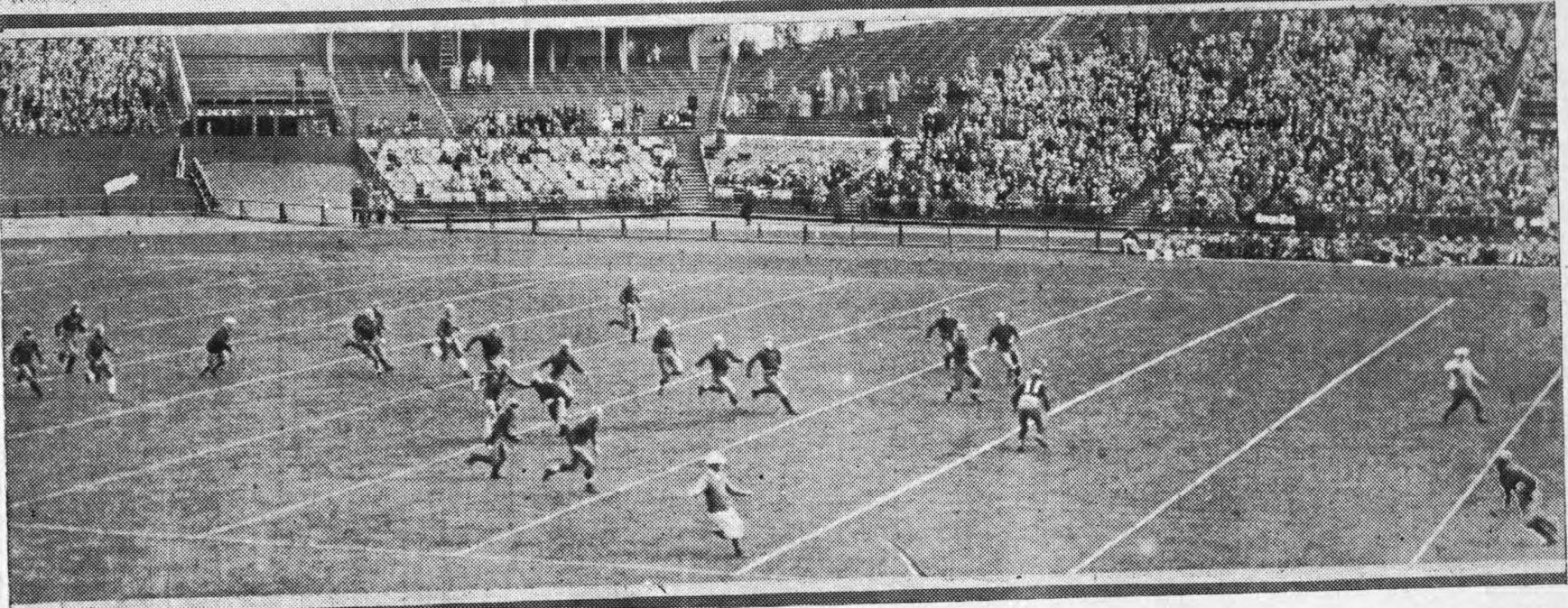
Georgia Tech vs. Penn State at Yankee Stadium, 1925

The first college football game played in Yankee Stadium was a 3-0 Syracuse victory over Pittsburgh on October 20, 1923. When an ill Ruth could not lead the Yankees to the World Series in 1925, college football took center stage at Yankee Stadium that fall. The fiercely competitive Notre Dame–Army game moved to Yankee Stadium, where it remained until 1947. In the 1928 game, with the score 0–0 at halftime, legendary Notre Dame coach Knute Rockne gave his "win one for the Gipper" speech (with reference to All-American halfback George Gipp, who died in 1920); Notre Dame went on to defeat Army, 12–6. The 1929 game between the two teams had the highest attendance in the series at 79,408. The 1946 Army vs. Notre Dame football game at Yankee Stadium is regarded as one of the 20th century college football Games of the Century.

Notre Dame played 24 games at Yankee Stadium, going 15–6–3. Army played 38, compiling a 17–17–4 record (including the best-attended game, on December 1, 1928, when Army lost to Stanford 26–0 before 86,000 fans). New York University played more games there than any other school, 96, using it as a secondary home field from 1923 to 1948, with a record of 52–40–4. Nearby Fordham University played 19 games there, going 13–5–1 while Manhattan University played 5 games there going 3–1–1.

Eight college football games were played at Yankee Stadium on Thanksgiving Day, the first seven by New York University. Perhaps, the most famous Thanksgiving Day game was the first. Oregon State Agricultural College (now Oregon State) was the first West Coast team to travel across the country and play an East Coast team. 8–1 NYU was a 3–1 favorite to beat 5–3 OSAC, but Oregon State upset the hometown favorites 25–13. Will Rogers lamented what the "Oregon apple knockers" had done to his "city slickers" in a column after the game. After the 1928 game, NYU beat Carnegie Tech (now Carnegie Mellon University) in 1931 and 1932, defeated Fordham in 1936, lost to Carnegie Tech in 1929 and lost to Fordham in 1934 and 1935. In the eighth game, in 1963, Syracuse beat Notre Dame, 14–7. This was a rematch following the teams' controversial 1961 game won by Notre Dame, 17–15.

The Gotham Bowl was scheduled to premiere at Yankee Stadium in 1960, but was canceled when no opponent could be found for Oregon State University. The 1961 game was moved to the Polo Grounds, and when just 6,166 people came to Yankee Stadium for the 1962 game, in which Nebraska defeated Miami (FL) 36–34, the Gotham Bowl was never played again. The Miami–Nebraska game was the only college bowl played at the stadium.

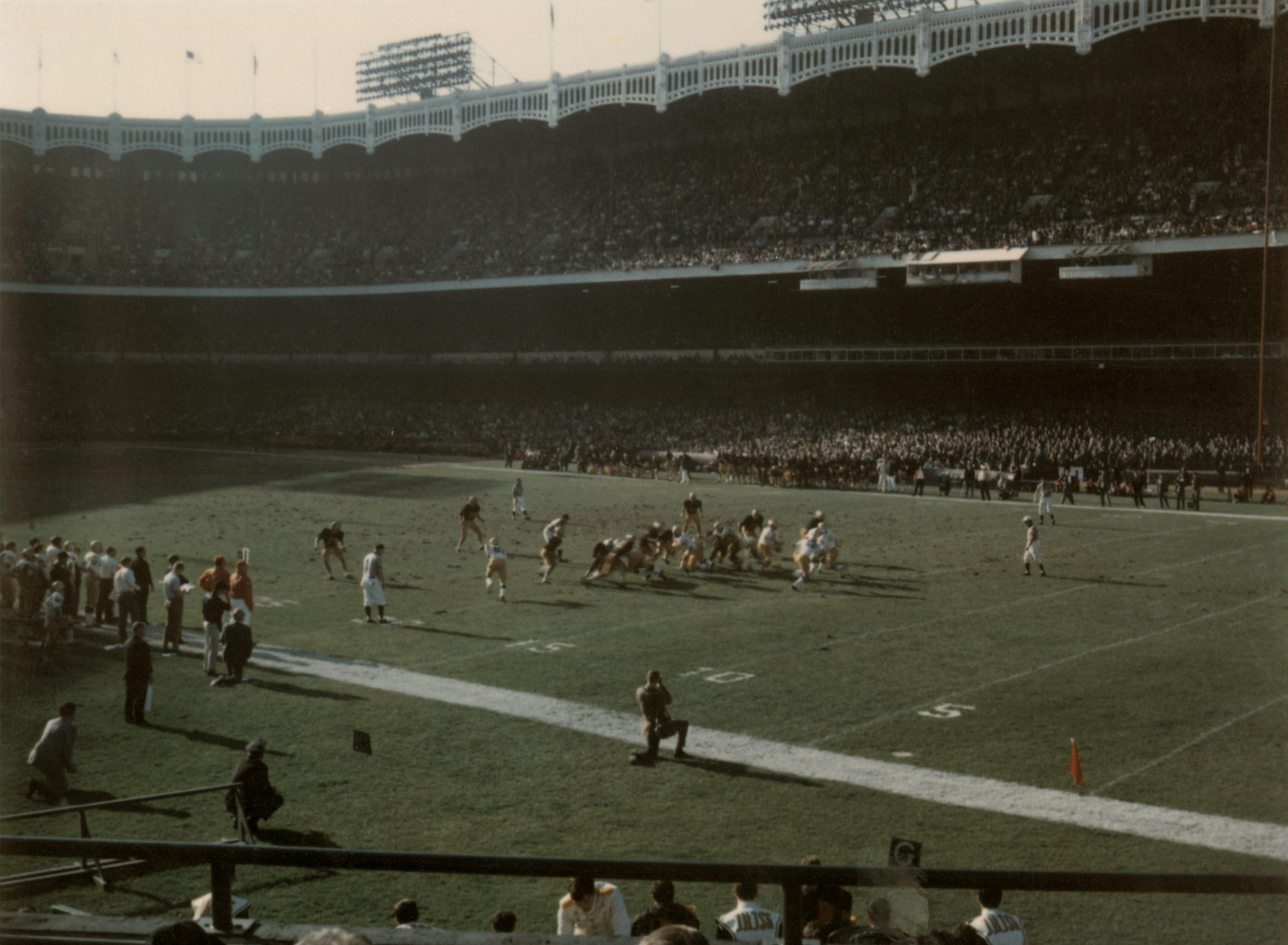
Notre Dame vs. Army at Yankee Stadium, 1969.

In 1969, Notre Dame and Army reprised their long series at the Stadium (1925–1946 except 1930) with one final game, which the Fighting Irish won, 45–0. It was the final game at the stadium for either team.

Starting in 1971, the Stadium hosted the Whitney M. Young Urban League Classic, a game between historically black colleges, often featuring Grambling State University of Louisiana, coached by Eddie Robinson, the first college coach to win 400 games. The Classic helped to spread the fame of Grambling and other similar schools. Yankee Stadium hosted its final Classic during the 1987 season, also the last time a football game was played there. Grambling lost to Central State University of Ohio, 37–21.

The Classic has been held at Giants Stadium and MetLife Stadium in New Jersey's Meadowlands Sports Complex ever since, though the Yankees remain a supporter of the event.

==== Games ====
| Date | Winning Team | Score | Losing Team | Attendance |
|---|---|---|---|---|
| October 20, 1923 | Syracuse | 3-0 | Pittsburgh | - |
| October 17, 1925 | Army | 27-0 | Notre Dame | - |
| November 13, 1926 | Notre Dame | 7-0 | Army | 63,029 |
| November 12, 1927 | Army | 18-0 | Notre Dame | 65,678 |
| November 10, 1928 | Notre Dame | 12-6 | Army | 78,188 |
| December 1, 1928 | Stanford | 26-0 | Army | 86,000 |
| November 30, 1929 | Notre Dame | 7-0 | Army | 79,408 |
| November 8, 1930 | Army | 18-0 | Illinois | - |
| December 13, 1930 | Army | 7-6 | Navy | - |
| November 28, 1931 | Army | 12-0 | Notre Dame | 78,559 |
| December 12, 1931 | Army | 17-7 | Navy | - |
| November 26, 1932 | Notre Dame | 21-0 | Army | 78,115 |
| December 2, 1933 | Notre Dame | 21-0 | Army | 73,594 |
| November 24, 1934 | Notre Dame | 12–6 | Army | 78,757 |
| November 16, 1935 | Notre Dame | 6–6 | Army | 78,114 |
| November 14, 1936 | Notre Dame | 20–6 | Army | 74,423 |
| November 13, 1937 | Notre Dame | 7–0 | Army | 76,359 |
| October 29, 1938 | Notre Dame | 14–0 | Army | 76,338 |
| November 4, 1939 | Notre Dame | 19–7 | Army | 75,632 |
| November 2, 1940 | Notre Dame | 7-0 | Army | 75,474 |
| November 1, 1941 | Notre Dame | 0-0 | Army | 75,226 |
| November 7, 1942 | Notre Dame | 13-0 | Army | 74,946 |
| November 21, 1942 | Army | 40–7 | Princeton | - |
| November 6, 1943 | Notre Dame | 26-0 | Army | 75,121 |
| November 11, 1944 | Army | 59-0 | Notre Dame | 75,142 |
| October 13, 1945 | Army | 28–7 | Michigan | 62,878 |
| November 10, 1945 | Army | 48-0 | Notre Dame | 74,621 |
| November 9, 1946 | Notre Dame | 0-0 | Army | 74,121 |
| October 11, 1947 | Army | 0–0 | Illinois | - |
| October 9, 1948 | Army | 43–0 | Stanford | - |
| October 14, 1950 | Army | 27–6 | Michigan | - |
| November 3, 1951 | USC | 28-6 | Army | - |
| October 31, 1959 | Army | 13-13 | Air Force | - |
| November 5, 1960 | Army | 9–6 | Syracuse | - |
| November 18, 1961 | Oklahoma | 14-8 | Army | - |
| November 17, 1962 | Pittsburgh | 7-6 | Army | - |
| December 15, 1962 | Nebraska | 36-34 | Miami (FL) | 6,166 |
| November 28, 1963 | Syracuse | 14-7 | Notre Dame | 56,972 |
| November 7, 1964 | Syracuse | 27-15 | Army | - |
| October 11, 1969 | Notre Dame | 45-0 | Army | - |

=== Professional football ===
In 1926, after negotiations failed with the fledgling NFL and the Chicago Bears, Red Grange and his agent C.C. Pyle formed the first American Football League and fielded a team called the New York Yankees based in Yankee Stadium. The league failed after only one year, but the team continued as a member of the NFL for two seasons before ceasing operations. A second New York Yankees football team, not related to the first, split its home games between Yankee Stadium and Downing Stadium as it competed in the second AFL in 1936 and 1937. A third AFL New York Yankees took the field in 1940 and became the New York Americans in 1941.

The New York Yankees of the All-America Football Conference (AAFC) played their home games at Yankee Stadium from 1946 to 1949. The 1947 AAFC championship game was held at Yankee Stadium. Following the 1949 season, the NFL New York Bulldogs acquired many of the players from the 1949 Yankees. Using the name the New York Yanks they played two seasons at Yankee Stadium, 1950 and 1951.

The New York Giants of the NFL played their home games at Yankee Stadium from 1956 to 1973. On December 28, 1958, Yankee Stadium hosted the 1958 NFL championship game, frequently called "The Greatest Game Ever Played". The Baltimore Colts tied the Giants, 17–17, on a field goal with seven seconds left. Led by quarterback Johnny Unitas, the Colts won in overtime, 23–17. The game's dramatic ending is often cited as elevating professional football to one of the United States' major sports. The game was one of three NFL championships games that were played at Yankee Stadium; the 1956 and 1962 championship games were also played there.

A play known simply as The Hit occurred at Yankee Stadium on November 20, 1960. The Philadelphia Eagles' Chuck Bednarik tackled the Giants' Frank Gifford in the last minute of a close game, forcing a fumble recovered by the Eagles that clinched the victory for Philadelphia and ultimately helped the Eagles dethrone the two-time defending champion Giants as NFL Eastern Conference champions. The hit left Gifford with a concussion and forced his temporary retirement from football for the remainder of the 1960 season and all of the 1961 season.

The Giants played their first two home games at Yankee Stadium in 1973, concluding their tenancy on September 23 with a 23–23 tie against the Philadelphia Eagles. In October, they moved to the Yale Bowl in New Haven, Connecticut, for the rest of the season.

In 1976, after the renovations, the New York Jets hosted 3 preseason games (Giants, Raiders, and Redskins) at Yankee Stadium.

=== Soccer ===
Celtic F.C. defeated New York Yankees in the first major soccer game to be played at the Stadium on June 28, 1931. In the coming three decades, a number of games between the Maccabbees - Jewish All-stars from Palestine and American all-stars were played. European club exhibitions first came in 1952, when on June 14, Liverpool drew 1–1 with Grasshopper Club Zürich. The next day, Tottenham Hotspur thrashed Manchester United 7–1, just a year after United had taken over for Spurs as champions of England. The following year, on June 8, the English national team defeated the U.S. national team 6–3, in a rematch of the Miracle on Grass match at the 1950 World Cup.

Major international clubs returned to the Stadium in 1966, with Pele's Santos of Brazil beating Inter Milan 4–1 on June 5. In 1967, C.A. Cerro of Uruguay played in the United Soccer Association during the summer months under the title "New York Skyliners". They played major games against Hibernian F.C. of Scotland, renamed "Toronto City", Cagliari F.C. of Italy, renamed "Chicago Mustangs" and Bangu Atlético Clube of Brazil, renamed "Houston Stars". During the same year, the stadium also became home to the New York Generals of the National Professional Soccer League. Upon the 1968 merger of the United Soccer Association and the National Professional Soccer League, a new league was created known as the North American Soccer League, where the Generals remained as the New York team. In 1968, in addition to league competition, the Generals took on Santos, winning 5–3 and Real Madrid, losing 4–1. That year, Santos also played and beat S.S.C. Napoli of Italy 4–2 at the Stadium, along with S.L. Benfica of Portugal, with whom they drew 3–3. The next year, four major international club games were played at the Stadium: Barcelona beat Juventus 3–2 on May 30, Inter Milan beat Sparta Prague 4–0 on June 27 and A.C. Milan defeated Panathinaikos 4–0 also on June 27. Finally, on June 29, Yankee Stadium hosted its own version of the Derby della Madonnina, with A.C. Milan defeating Inter 6–4. The latter three games that year were all part of a three-day "United States Cup of Champions".

On September 15, 1968, the U.S. national soccer team played an international friendly against the Israel national team at the Stadium. It was the first game for the U.S. in 15 months and 10,118 saw Israel and the U.S. draw 3-3.

In 1971 and 1976, the New York Cosmos of the NASL played their home games at Yankee Stadium. During the 1971 season, they also hosted Hearts from Scotland, and Apollon Kalamarias of Greece. In 1976 the team's star attraction was Pelé. The Brazil native, known as "The King of Football", was considered the best player in the world. Also that year, in Yankee Stadium's final international match on May 28, England defeated Italy 3–2 as part of the Bicentennial Cup Tournament. Finally, on August 10, 1976, the last soccer game was played at Yankee Stadium, with the Cosmos thrashing the Miami Toros 8–2. The Cosmos moved to Giants Stadium for the 1977 season.

==== International soccer matches ====
| Date | Winning Team | Result | Losing Team | Competition | Attendance |
|---|---|---|---|---|---|
| June 28, 1931 | (Scotland) Celtic | 4-1 | (United States) New York Yankees | Friendly | — |
| June 14, 1952 | (England) Liverpool | 1-1 | (Switzerland) Grasshoppers | Friendly | — |
| June 15, 1952 | (England) Tottenham Hotspur | 7-1 | (England) Manchester United | Friendly | — |
| June 8, 1953 | England | 6–3 | United States | Friendly | — |
| June 5, 1966 | (Brazil) Santos | 4–1 | (Italy) Internazionale | Friendly | — |
| June 21, 1968 | (Brazil) Santos | 4–2 | (Italy) Napoli | Friendly | 43,002 |
| July 12, 1968 | (United States) New York Generals | 5-3 | (Brazil) Santos | Friendly | 15,645 |
| August 21, 1968 | (Spain) Real Madrid | 4–1 | (United States) New York Generals | Friendly | 16,520 |
| September 1, 1968 | (Brazil) Santos | 3-3 | (Portugal) Benfica | Friendly | 36,904 |
| September 15, 1968 | United States | 3-3 | Israel | Friendly | 10,118 |
| May 30, 1969 | (Spain) Barcelona | 3-2 | (Italy) Juventus | Friendly | — |
| June 27, 1969 | (Italy) Internazionale | 4–0 | (Czech Republic) Sparta Prague | Friendly | — |
| June 27, 1969 | (Italy) Milan | 4–0 | (Greece) Panathinaikos | Friendly | — |
| May 28, 1976 | England | 3-2 | Italy | Bicentennial Cup Tournament | 40,650 |

=== Ice hockey ===
National Hockey League (NHL) executives inquired about the possibility of using Yankee Stadium for an outdoor ice hockey match featuring the New York Rangers in the 2008–09 season after the successful reception of both the 2003 Heritage Classic and the 2008 NHL Winter Classic outdoor games. If approved, it would have been the final sporting event at the current stadium. The NHL, however, decided to hold the second Winter Classic in Chicago, at Wrigley Field. The new Yankee Stadium would end up hosting two outdoor NHL games in 2014.

=== Concerts ===
The first concert ever held there was an ensemble R&B show on June 21, 1969, put together by the Isley Brothers; the first rock concert held at the stadium was on June 22, 1990, by Billy Joel. It was also the site of two dates of U2's Zoo TV Tour in 1992. During one song, Bono paid tribute to the show's setting with the line "I dreamed I saw Joe DiMaggio/Dancing with Marilyn Monroe". Pink Floyd also performed two sold-out shows at this venue on their final North American tour in 1994 in support of their album The Division Bell.

=== Other events ===
Beginning in 1950, the stadium began holding religious conventions of Jehovah's Witnesses. The 1958 New York International Convention of Jehovah's Witnesses attracted 253,922 people from all over the world, although many were at the nearby Polo Grounds, the Yankee Stadium total of 123,707 in a single day remains the biggest attendance ever for any event at Yankee Stadium and is commemorated by a historical marker in the sidewalk nearby. These conventions would continue on until the late 1980s. When room ran out in the stands, the ladies were asked to remove their heels, and people were brought in to sit in the outfield. There was also a makeshift camp nearby where the program was broadcast for hundreds others to listen to.

On July 20, 1957, evangelist Billy Graham attracted a crowd of 100,000 to a televised "crusade" at Yankee Stadium. A New York Times article of the following day described the turnout as "the largest crowd in stadium history" to that time.

Cardinal Francis Spellman (1957), Pope Paul VI (1965), Pope John Paul II (1969 as a cardinal, 1979 as pope) and Pope Benedict XVI (2008) all celebrated Mass at the ballpark, along with numerous clergy. On June 21, 1990, a rally was held at Yankee Stadium for Nelson Mandela upon his release from prison. On September 23, 2001, Yankee Stadium hosted a memorial service for victims of the September 11 terrorist attacks in New York City.

On March 10, 2006, Yankee Stadium saw its only wedding at home plate. Blind sportswriter Ed Lucas, who has been a member of the Yankee family for over 40 years, got special permission from the Yankees, the City of New York and Major League Baseball to exchange vows with his fiancée, Allison Pfieffle, on the same spot where Lou Gehrig made his famous farewell speech, among the many notable events. Over 400 people, including present and former members of the Yankee family were in attendance to see the happy couple united, and the ceremony was broadcast on ESPN, the YES Network, NBC's Today Show and other national media outlets.

== Photo gallery ==
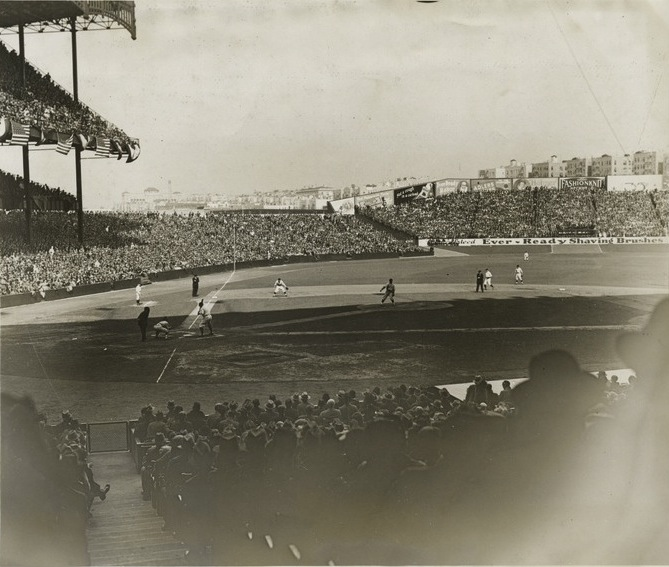
The Stadium during the 1927 season before the left field grandstand was extended

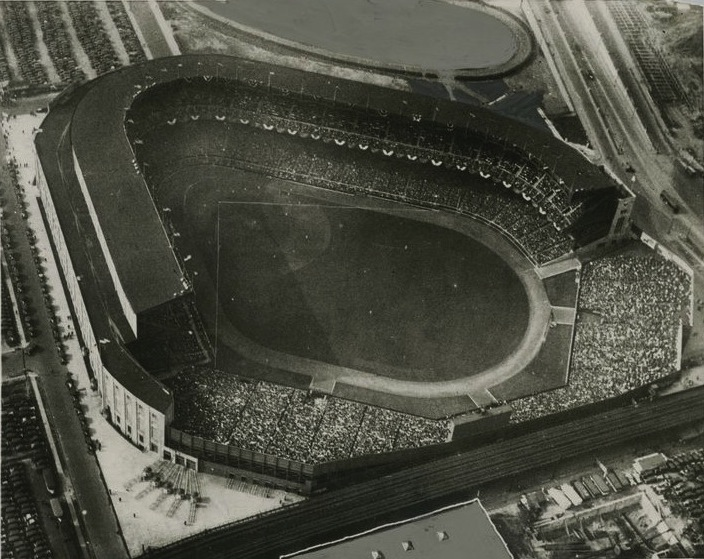
Aerial view of Yankee Stadium after the left field grandstand was extended

Panoramic view of the pre-renovated Yankee Stadium

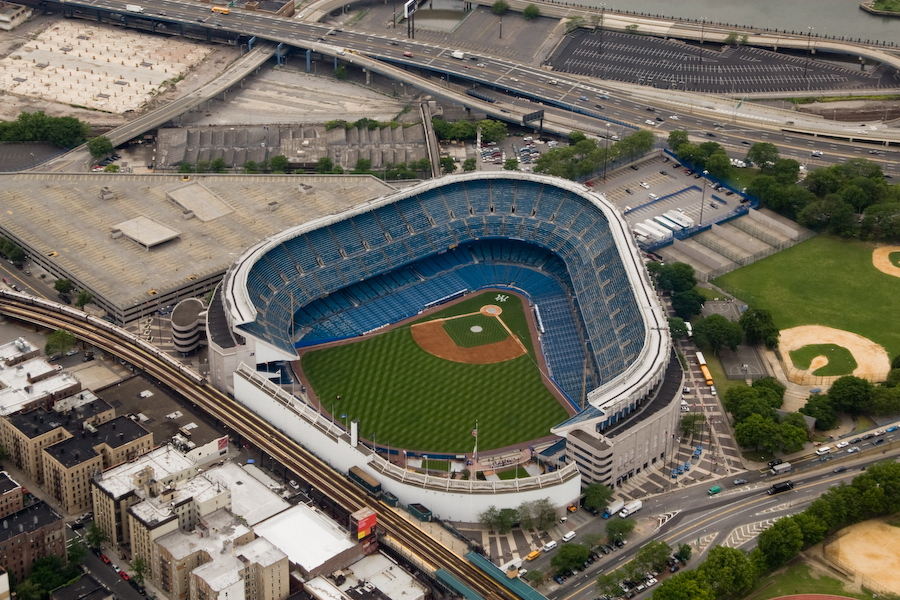
Aerial photo of the stadium and surrounding neighborhood

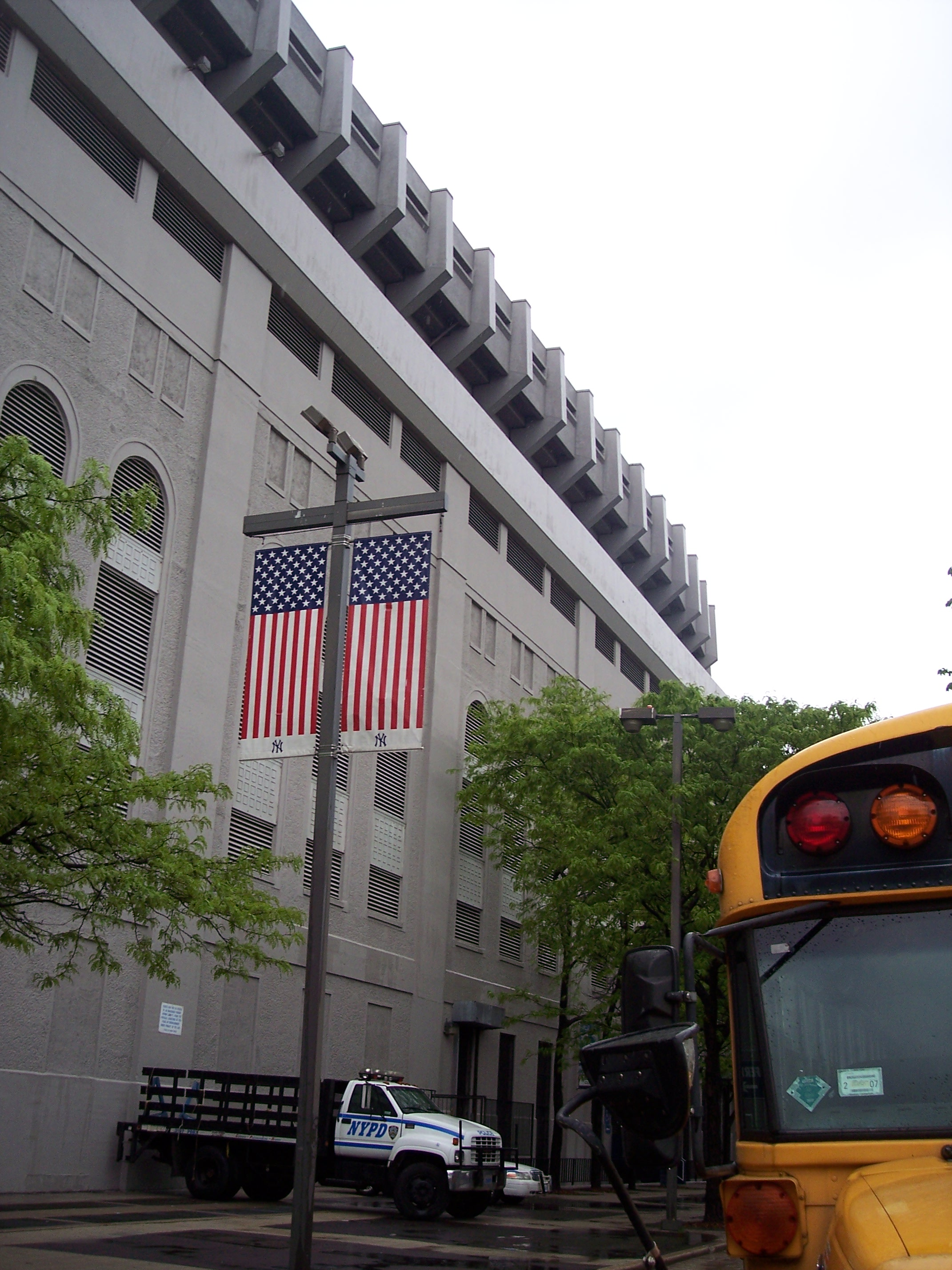
The outer wall of the stadium

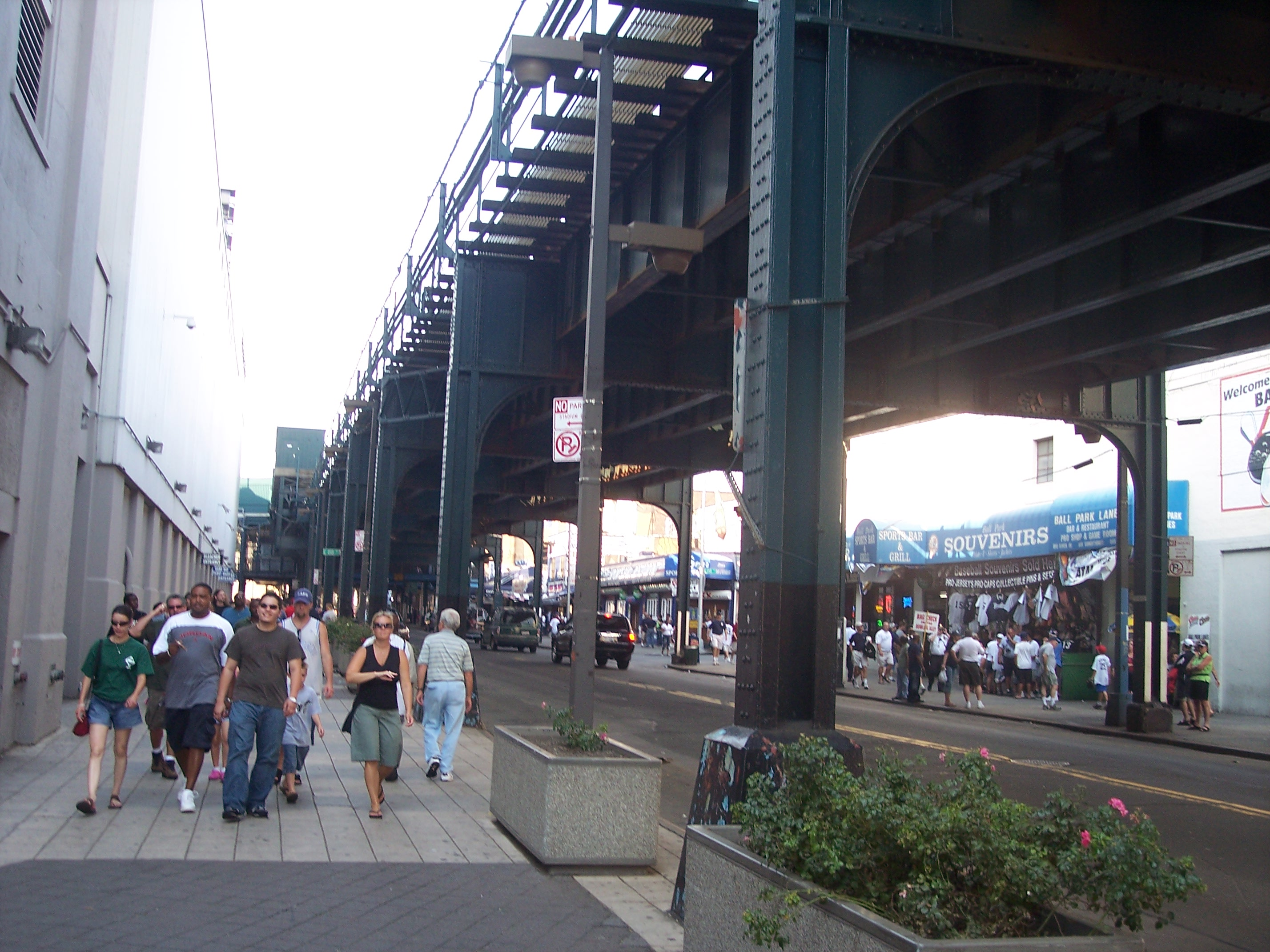
River Avenue, located behind the stadium and under the 4 (New York City Subway service) train

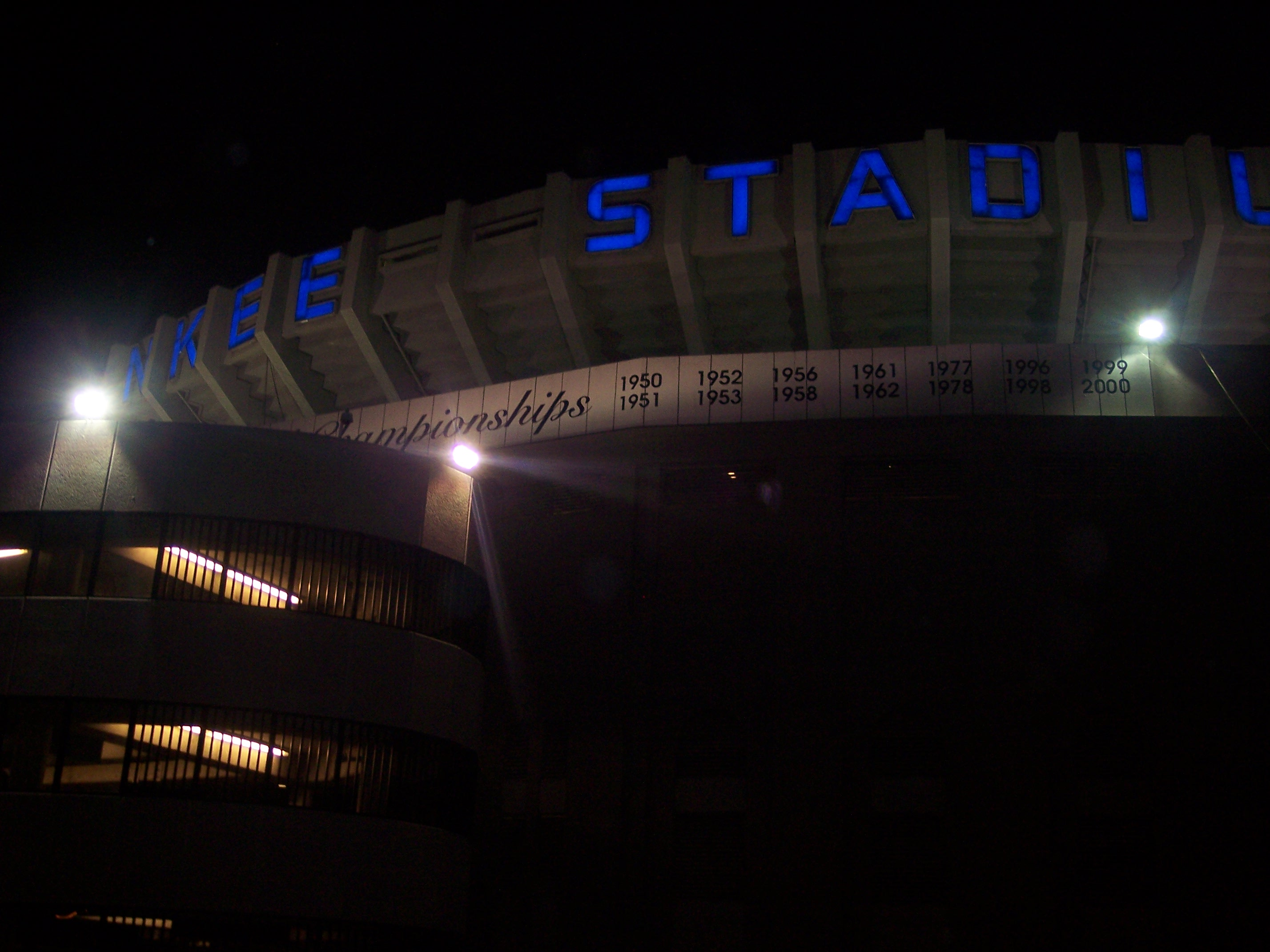
The front of the stadium at night

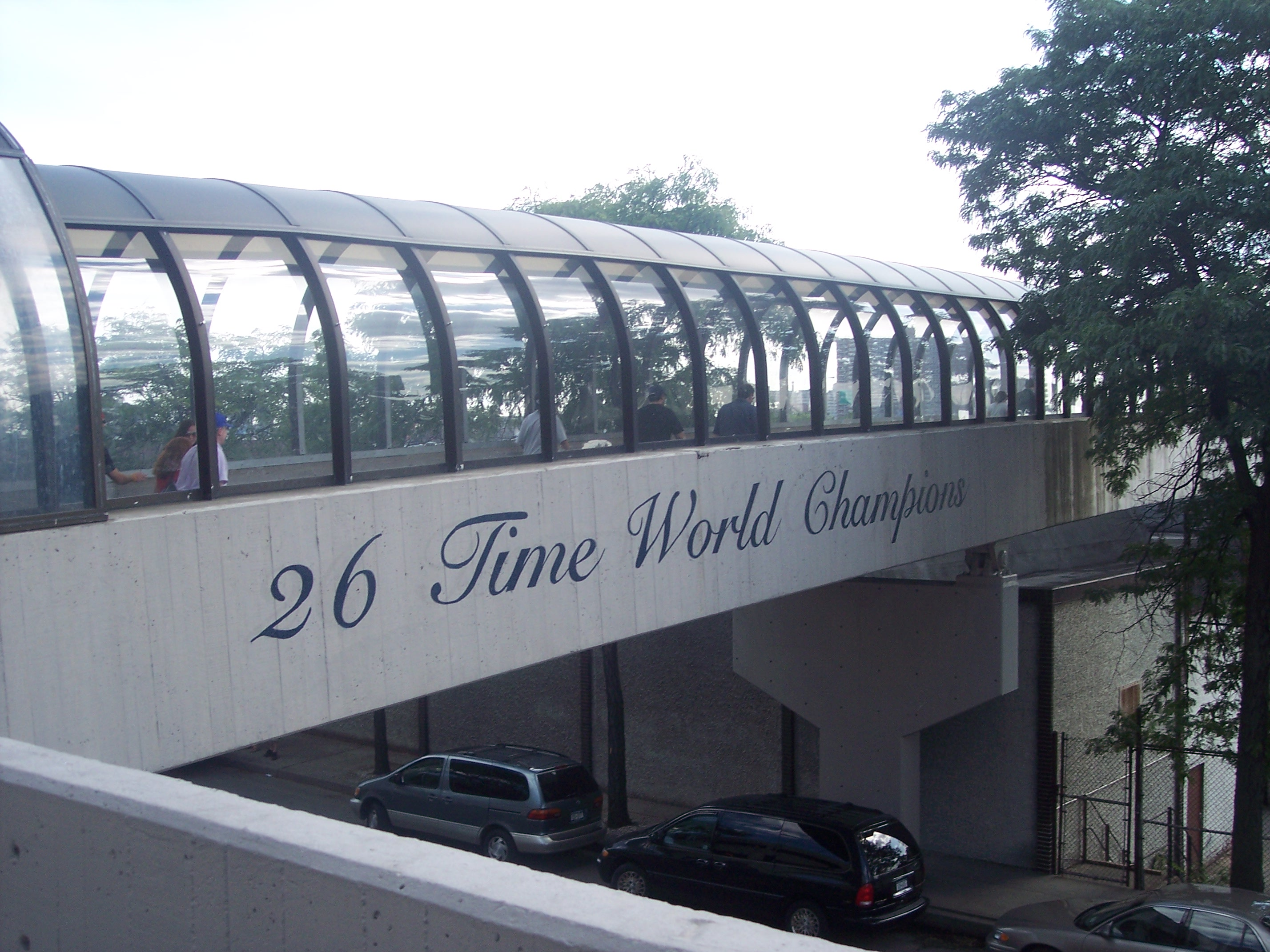
A bridge leading to the front of the stadium over Metro-North Railroad tracks

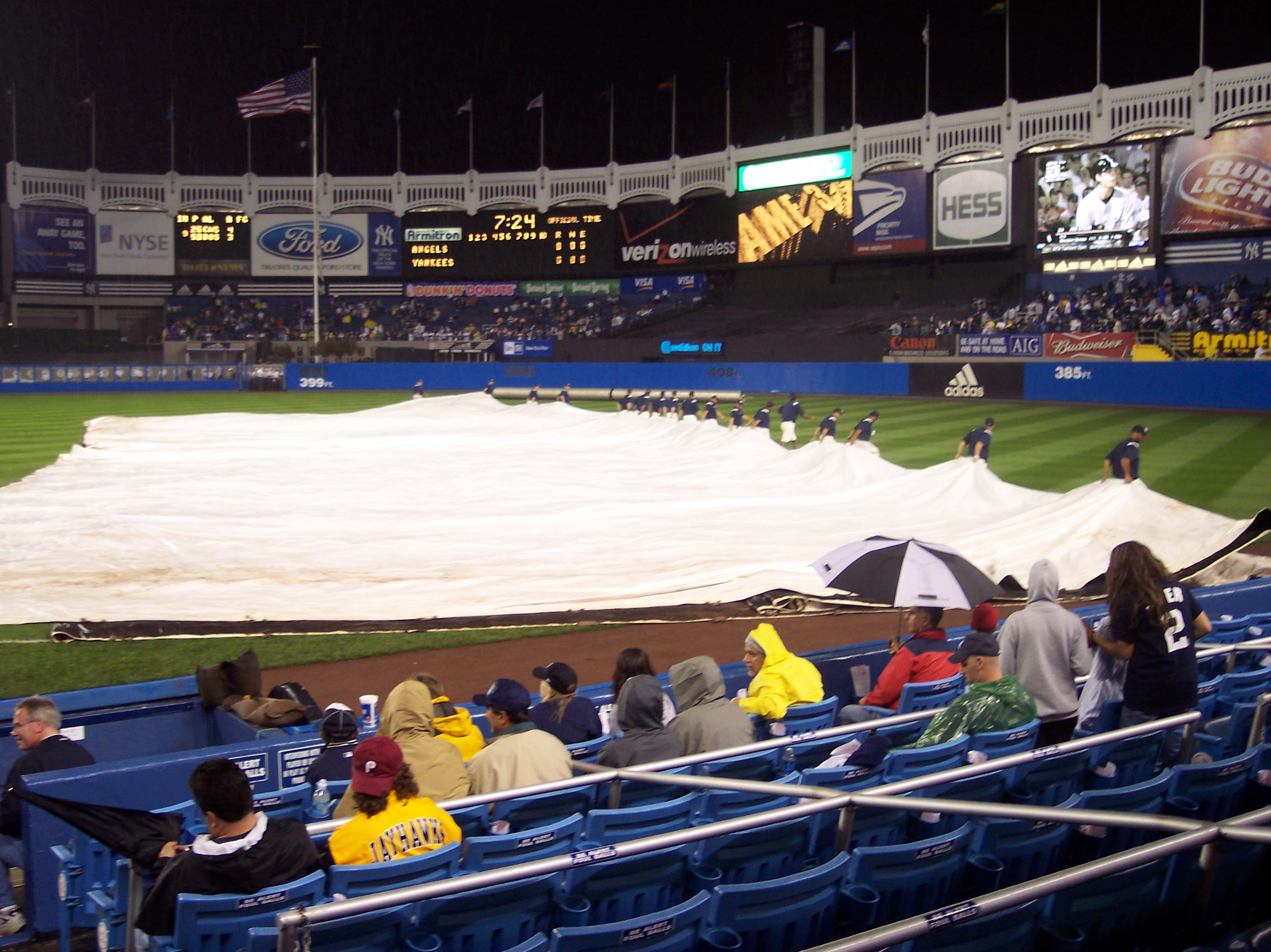
The grounds crew taking the tarp off the infield

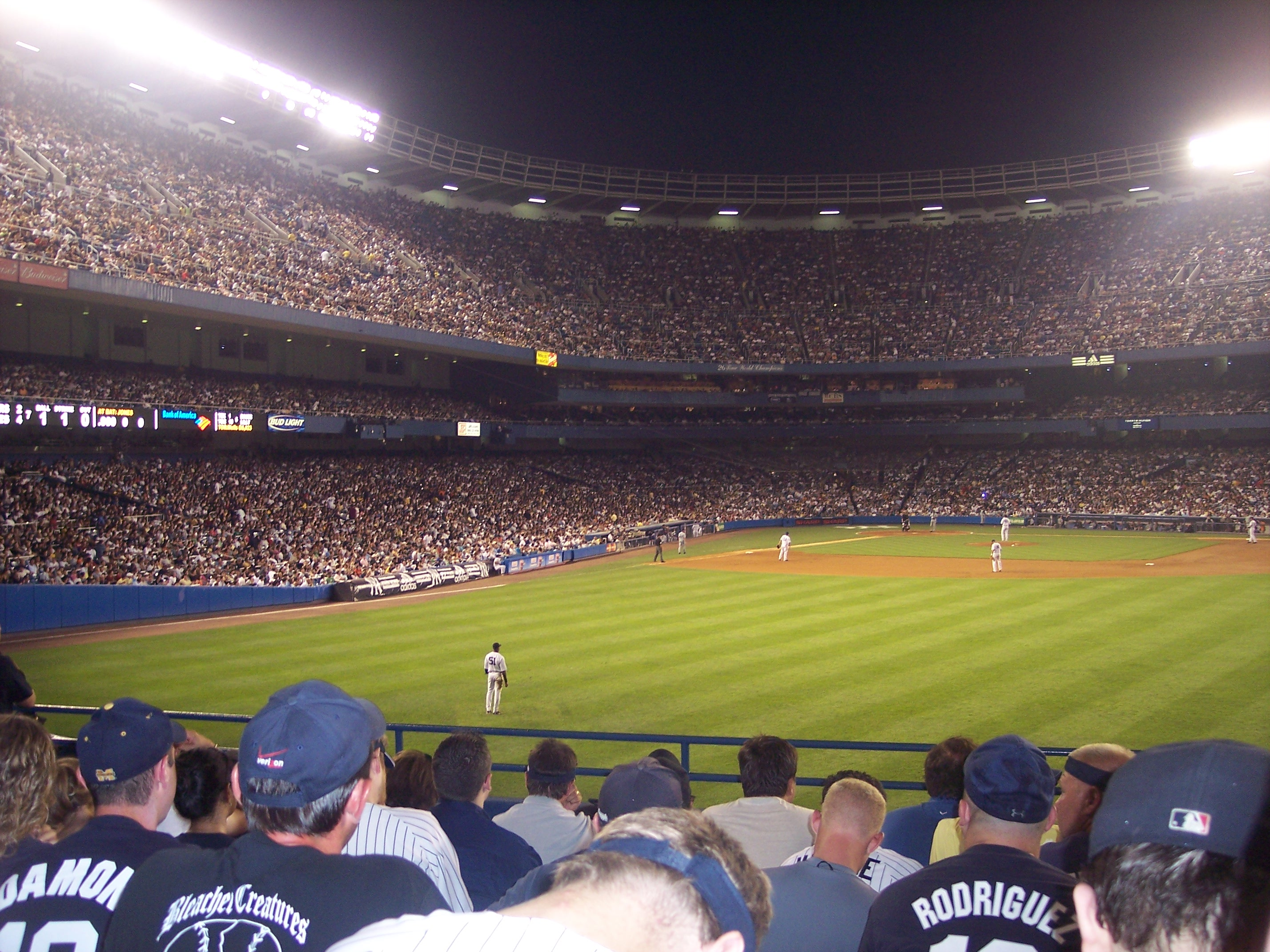
The stadium during a night game

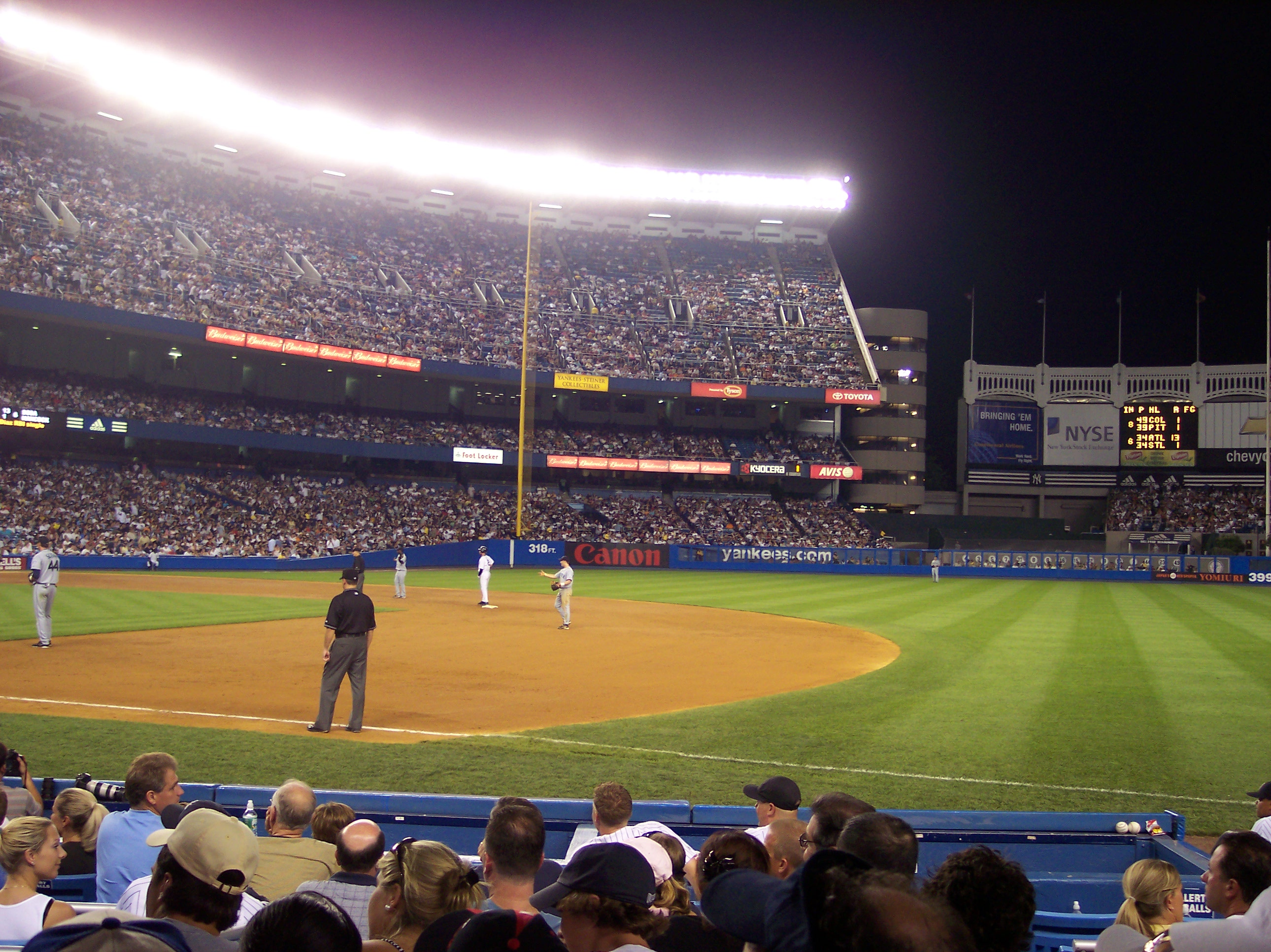
The left field side of the grandstand

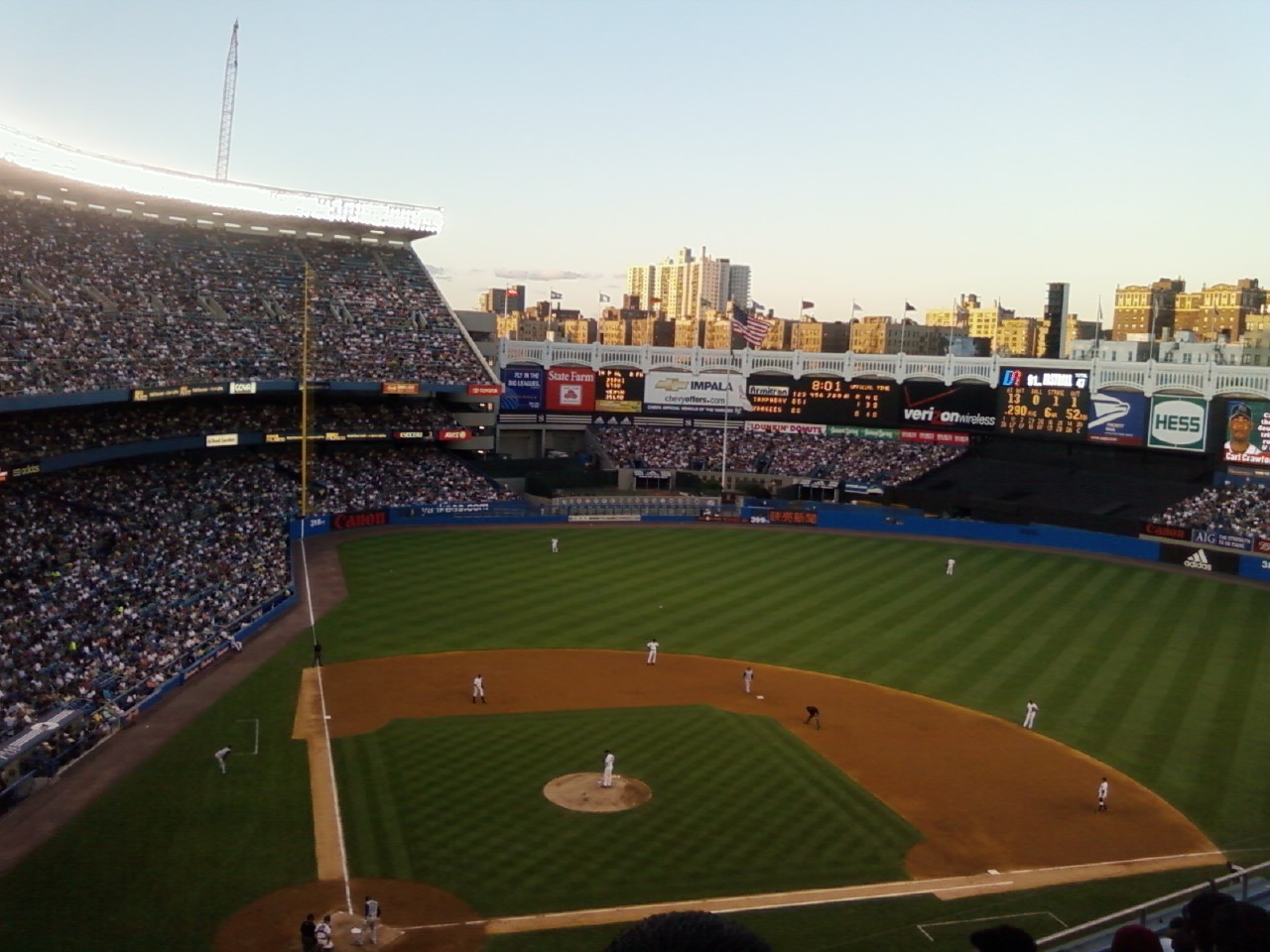
The Stadium just before sunset from the upper deck

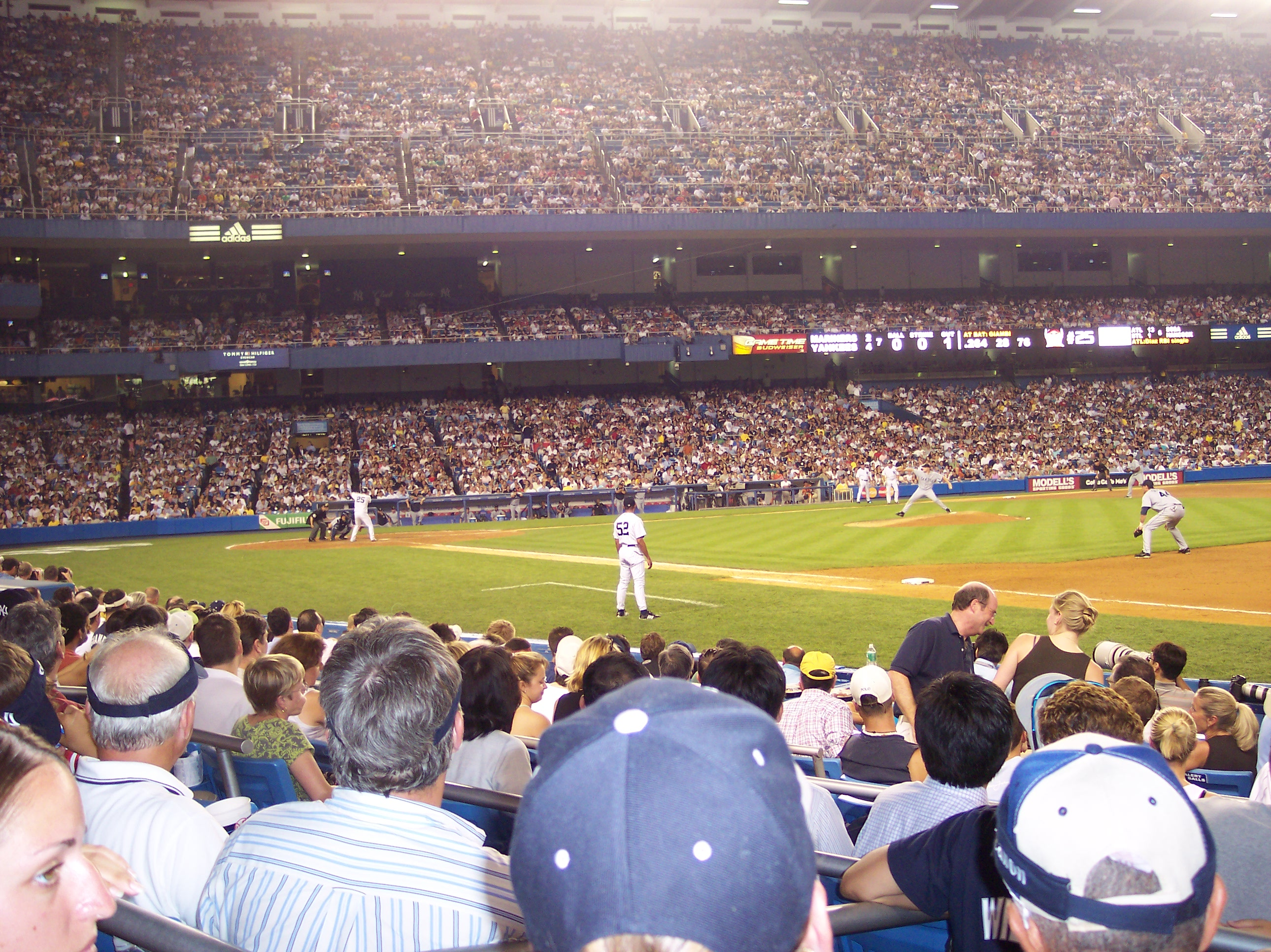
The infield during a night game

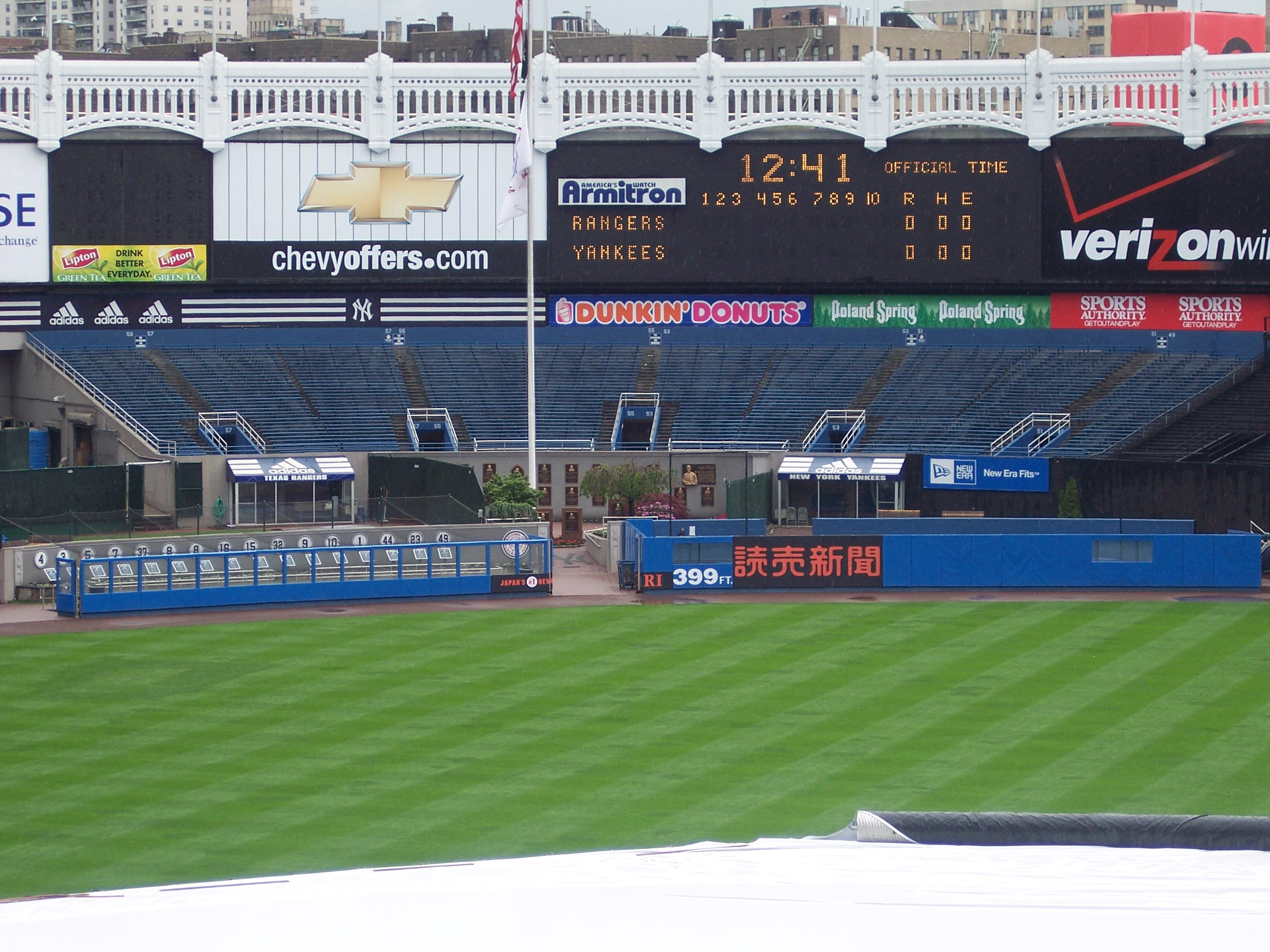
Monument Park, the LF bleachers, the bullpens, and the retired numbers

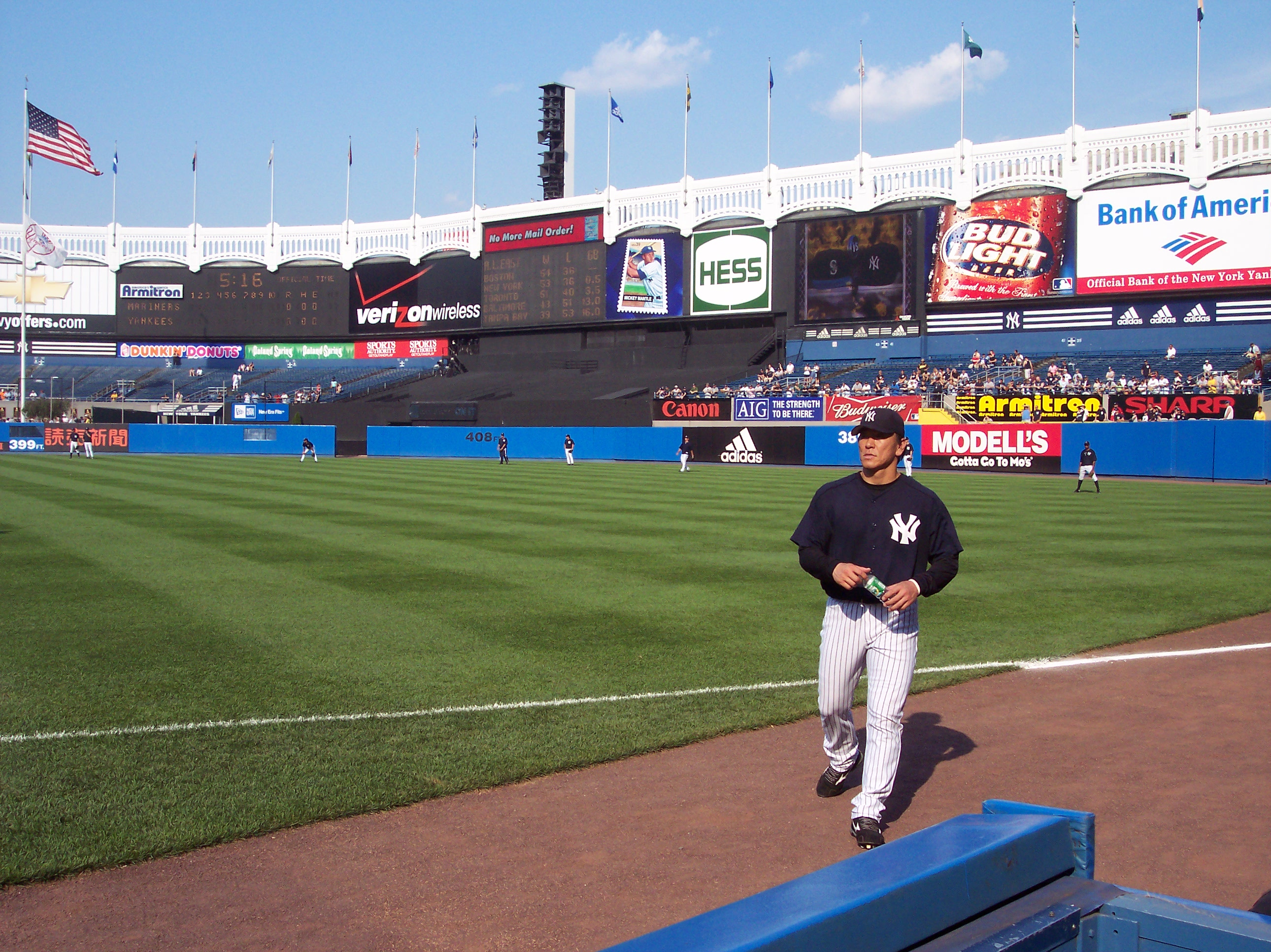
The outfield during batting practice

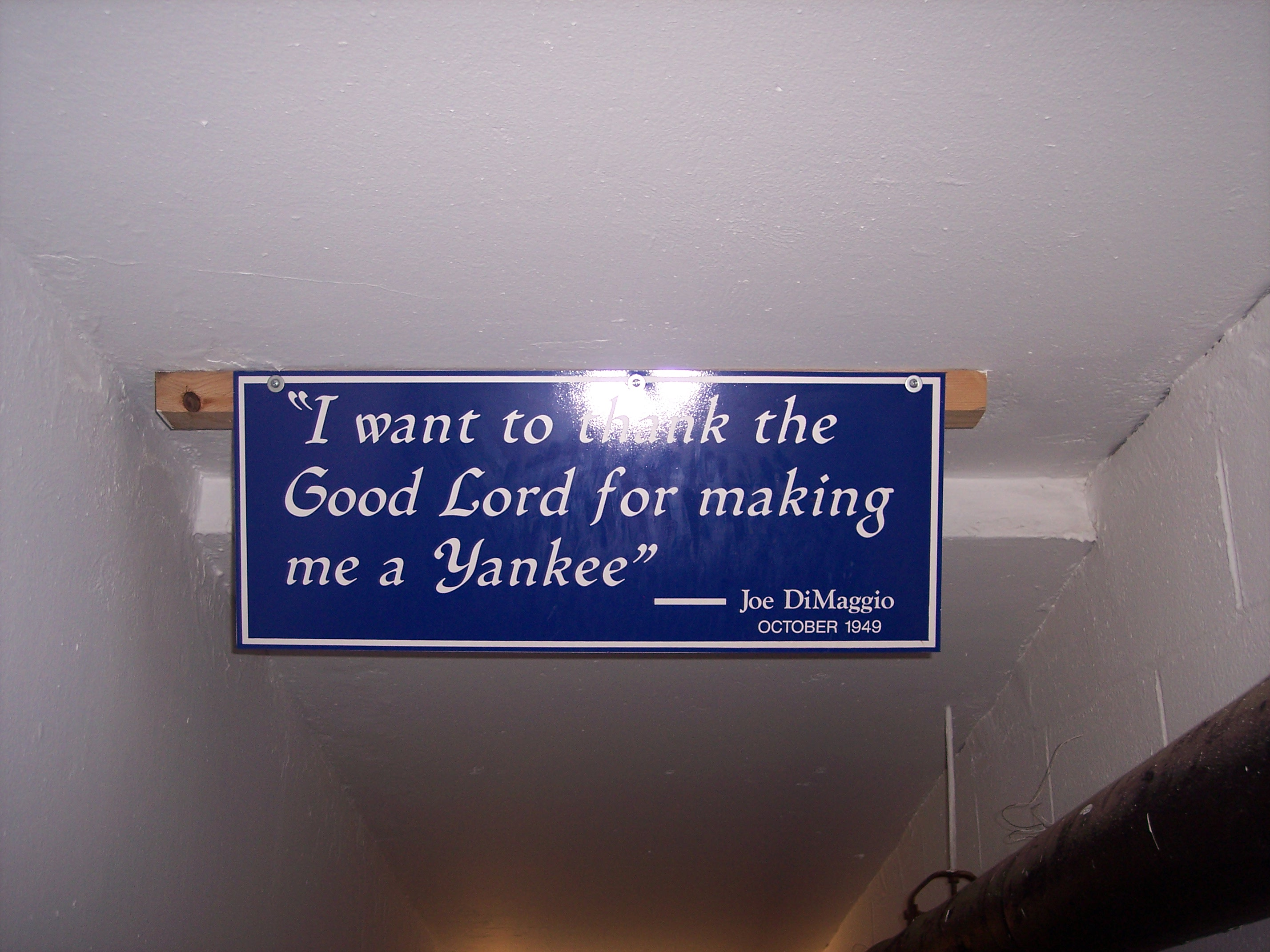
A sign in the hallway en route to the dugout that the Yankees touch as they come out of the clubhouse. Derek Jeter, with permission from the Yankees, took the sign after the stadium closed.

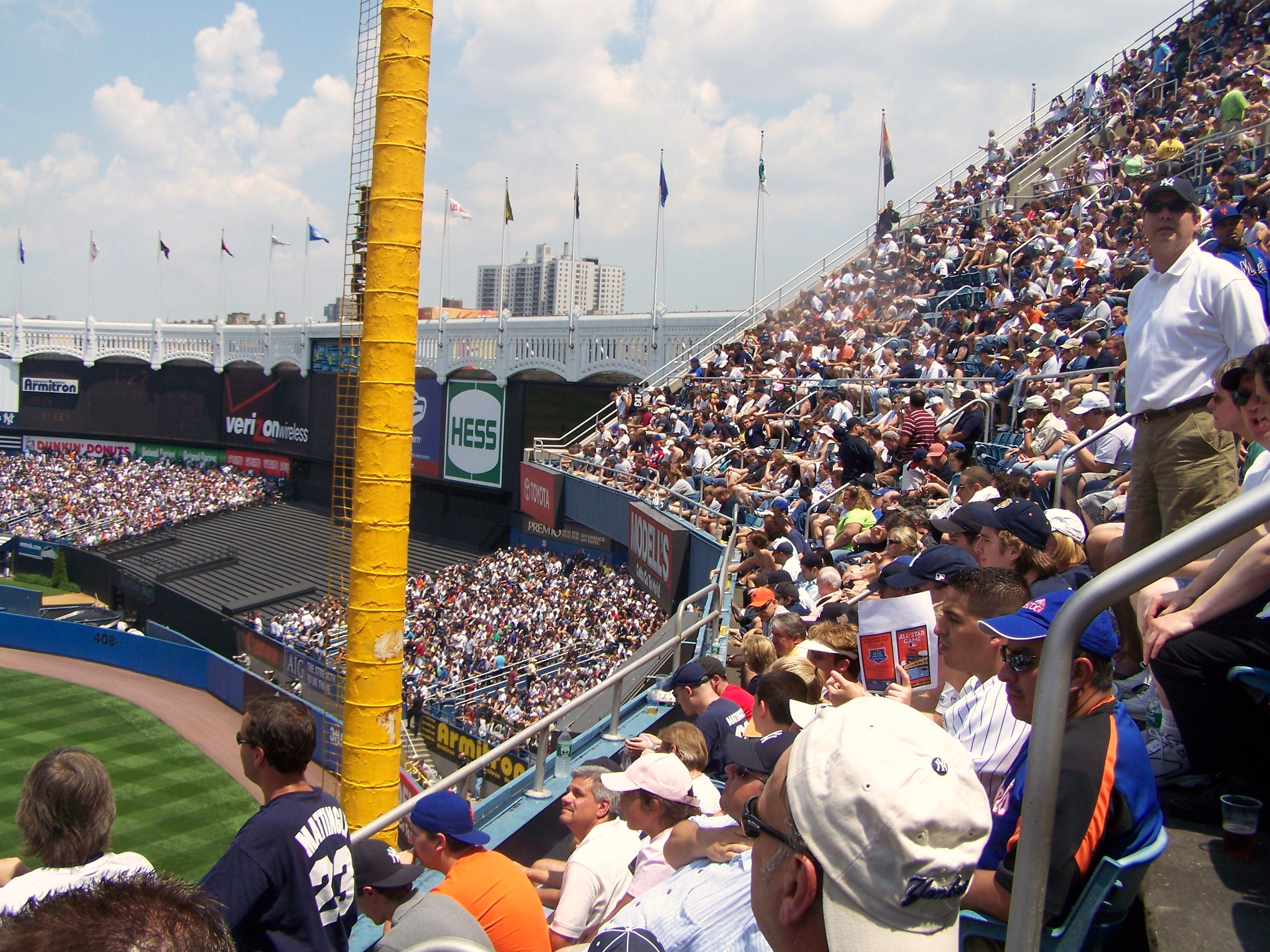
The foul pole, upper deck, and the bleachers

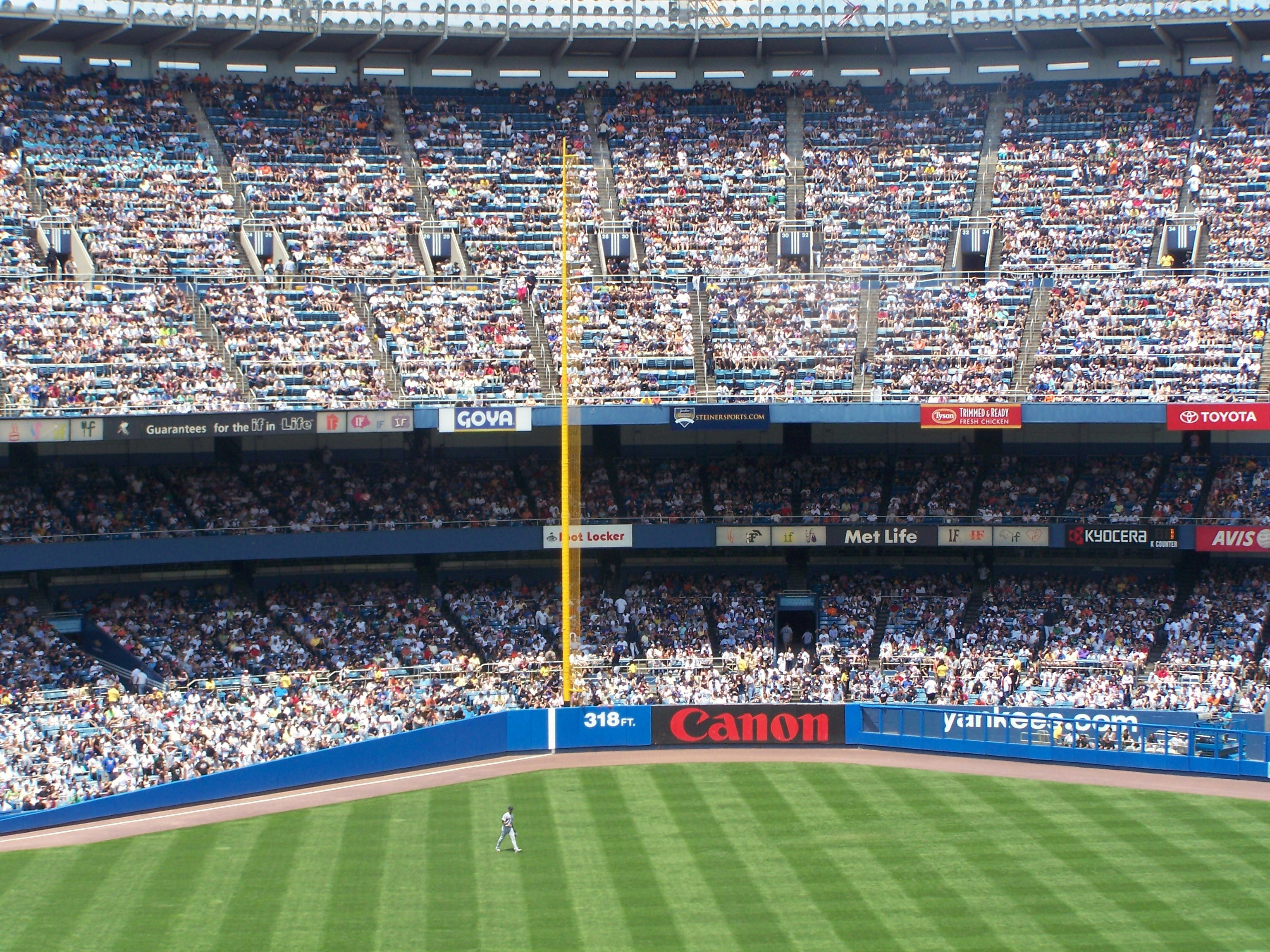
The left field corner at Yankee Stadium

Buster Keaton at the Stadium 1928, in film 15:30-18:45

Events and tenants
| Preceded by Polo Grounds; Shea Stadium | Home of the New York Yankees; 1923–1973; 1976–2008 | Succeeded by Shea Stadium; Yankee Stadium II |
| Preceded by Polo Grounds | Home of the New York Giants (NFL); 1956 – September 30, 1973 | Succeeded by Yale Bowl |
| Preceded by Crosley Field; Municipal Stadium; Veterans Stadium; AT&T Park | Host of the All-Star Game; 1939; 1960 2nd Game; 1977; 2008 | Succeeded by Sportsman's Park; Candlestick Park; San Diego Stadium; Busch Stadium |
