= Buffalo Indians =

Buffalo Indians-Tigers

General information
- Founded: 1940
- Folded: 1941
- Stadium: Civic Stadium
- Headquartered: Buffalo, New York, United States
- Colors: Green, White (1940) Black, Gold (1941)

Personnel
- Owner: Buffalo American Legion
- Head coach: Earl Seick (1940); Orlando Nesmith (1940-41); Paul Engebretsen (1941)

Team history
- Buffalo Indians (1940); Buffalo Tigers (1941)

League / conference affiliations
- American Football league III

The Buffalo Indians were a professional American football team that competed in the third American Football League in 1940 and in 1941. The team played its home games in Civic Stadium in Buffalo, New York. Owned by the Buffalo American Legion, the Indians were managed by Earl "Red" Seick, who was also player-coach for the team for the first five games in 1940 (he was replaced by Orlando Nesmith for the rest of the season). While most of the AFL membership focused on raiding the rosters of the local members of the National Football League teams, the Indians (which did not have a local NFL competitor) concentrated on signing local talent, castoffs from the NFL, and men who played in the defunct second American Football League.

Featuring the running talents of halfback Carl Littlefield, the Indians struggled to a 2–8 record in 1940 (having been shut out four times and forfeited one game; they also won one game by forfeit) and finished in fifth place. The club was reorganized in early 1941, with a new name (Buffalo Tigers) and a new coach (Tiny Engebretsen). The changes yielded the same results once league play resumed that fall, Buffalo finishing with a 2–6 record and fourth place in the five team loop before the AFL suspended operations after the Pearl Harbor attack and the U.S. entry into World War II.

By the time the war ended, both the league and the Buffalo Tigers officially ceased to exist, but Buffalo's foray into major league football was not forgotten as the All-America Football Conference formed in 1946 with a new team, the Buffalo Bisons, being the new tenants in the newly renamed War Memorial Stadium.

== Origin ==
The history of the Buffalo Indians begins in early 1940, with an agreement among businessmen in Buffalo, New York City, and Boston to start a new major league football league to compete with the established National Football League. At roughly the same time, a minor league calling itself the American Football League announced plans for expansion with the goal of becoming a major league itself. When the businessmen convinced the owners of the Columbus Bullies, Cincinnati Bengals and the newly minted expansion team, the Milwaukee Chiefs to join their league, the minor AFL imploded as the formation the new six-team "major league," the third "major" American Football League, was announced July 14, 1940.

The Indians were originally owned by the Buffalo American Legion, which "Red" Seick acting in the triple role of player, coach, and business manager. The team drew its players from two sources, area college stars and men who once played in the NFL and the second AFL.

== 1940 ==
Within two weeks of the league's organizational meeting (held in Buffalo's Hotel Lafayette, August 4–5, 1940), Seick proceeded to sign up local college talent and players who had been out of pro football for one or two years. The team's first quarterback was Steve Banas, former Pittsburgh Steeler and Detroit Lion. New starting tackle Ed Karp was another former Steeler who helped Byron White's rushing game decades before he became a U.S. Supreme Court justice. A third former Steeler, Carl Littlefield, became the Indians' starting halfback.

Despite the presence of local and veteran talent, the Indians suffered from a lack of offense. Banas was shifted from quarterback to fullback in the fourth game and was replaced behind center by former St. Bonaventure star Steve Hrycyszyn. About the same time, former New York Yankee Orlando "Ole" Nesmith was signed to be a backup halfback; a week later, Nesmith replaced Seick as player-coach of the Indians (which, at that time, had a 1–4 record). Buffalo then proceeded to lose four more games (one by forfeit) before winning its last scheduled game (against the Cincinnati Bengals) by forfeit.

=== Two forfeits ===
While the Bengals had two games cancelled (against the Milwaukee Chiefs and against the New York Yankees) in 1940, the Buffalo Indians were involved in two forfeits, the last two forfeited games in the history of major professional football.

On November 17, 1940, the last scheduled home game in Buffalo was called after a storm dumped four inches of snow on the field, which was covered by a tarpaulin. The snow had partially melted overnight, and then froze on top of the cover... and also froze the tarp to the ground itself. Early-arriving fans assisted the grounds crew in a futile attempt to clear the field of snow and remove the tarp while other fans struggled to find usable seats in the stands. When the time for kickoff approached, it became apparent that the field would not be in playable condition for the game; so the officiating crew declared a forfeit in favor of the visiting New York Yankees.

Two weeks later, the Tigers were scheduled to play their last game of the season, but the scheduled opponent, the Cincinnati Bengals, were so diminished by a rash of injuries that they couldn't field a team in time for the game. A forfeit was declared, this time in favor of the Tigers, the last forfeit to be declared in major professional football in the United States.

== 1941 ==
The span of time between the last game of the 1940 season and the first game of 1941 brought sizable changes to the Buffalo AFL team. A reorganization resulted in a new owner (coal magnate Fiore Cesare), a new coach (Paul Engebretsen), and a new team name (the Buffalo Tigers). Most of the 1940 Indians players did not return to Buffalo in 1941 to play as Tigers, but stars Steve Hrycyszyn, Steve Banas, and Carl Littlefield were back in the hope of improving on the 2–8 record the team had in 1940.

Engebretsen signed former Milwaukee Chief end Sherm Barnes and back Andy Karpus, who had started for four teams in two American Football Leagues. Joe Ratica, formerly of the Brooklyn Dodgers and Boston Bears, became the Tigers' new starting center.

The efforts to improve the offense from its four-shutout performance in 1940 appeared to be in vain as the 1941 season began when the Tigers were shut out by the Cincinnati Bengals (a team that lost twice to Buffalo the previous season) by a score of 29–0, and then to the newly renamed New York Americans 26-7 three days later, but the rematch with the Bengals ended in a 16–0 victory for the Tigers. It was the first on-field victory for the Buffalo franchise in over a year.

While Tiny Engebretsen's upgrades in the team's offense were taking hold (the Tigers scored touchdowns in each remaining game except one), they were still losing with regularity, matching the two wins they had in 1940. A 14-0 whitewash by the Milwaukee Chiefs ended the Tigers' 2–6 season.

=== One game with Johnny "Blood" McNally ===
The third American Football League featured teams with fluid rosters, and the Buffalo Indians and Tigers were no exception. For the October 8, 1941, game against the New York Americans, three members of the Kenosha Cardinals appeared in Buffalo Tigers uniforms: two members of the Cardinals roster (Johnny Dolan, former Pittsburgh Steeler and Chicago Cardinal Ernie Wheeler) and the Kenosha coach, eventual Pro Football Hall of Fame inductee Johnny Bloody. (McNally, to date, is the only player to have played in this particular incarnation of the AFL to be inducted into the Hall.

The Kenosha Cardinals had an unexpected two weeks off after the cancellation of two games between the Cardinals and the Milwaukee Chiefs when McNally took notice of his old teammate Tiny Engebretsen's Buffalo Tigers were outmanned by the Cincinnati Bengals in the first game of the AFL season by the score of 29–0. McNally, Dolan, and Wheeler traveled from Kenosha to Buffalo for the Tigers' second game.

Against the Americans, McNally rushed five times in the game (longest run: eight yards), but the Tigers lost again, 26–7. While NcNally returned to Kenosha, Wheeler and Dolan stayed with the Tigers for a rematch with Cincinnati on October 19, 1941, a 16–0 victory for Buffalo. Dolan and Wheeler returned to Kenosha after the game, but a month later, Wheeler returned to Buffalo, this time with Kenosha teammate Clem Naughton in tow, for the Tigers' last two games of the 1941 season (both losses against the Milwaukee Chiefs).

== Demise ==
Although the AFL lost the Boston Bears franchise prior to the beginning of the 1941 season, its owners were optimistic about the league's long-term future. Although the league's average attendance was less than that of the more-established NFL, the AFL seemed to be on as firm a financial footing as the older league. By the end of the 1941 season, the new Detroit franchise was preparing for a 1942 debut in the AFL. The league was the first major football league to complete a double round robin schedule, in which each team played each other twice.

All the plans for 1942 came to a sudden stop upon the Japanese attack on Pearl Harbor and the start of World War II on December 7, 1941. With the induction of college and professional players into the U.S. military, it became increasingly apparent to the AFL owners that the global conflict would put the continued success of the league into question.

On September 2, 1942, AFL president William D. Cox announced the suspension of league activities until the end of the war. Neither the third AFL nor the Buffalo Tigers returned; 1946 saw the beginning of a new professional football team in Buffalo (the Bisons, later renamed the Bills) in a new major league (the All-America Football Conference).

Team	Year	W	L	T	Finish	Coach
Buffalo Indians	1940	2	8	0	5th (AFL)	Earl "Red" Seick, Orlando Nesmith
Buffalo Tigers	1941	2	6	0	4th (AFL)	Paul "Tiny" Engebretsen

Roster of Buffalo Indians - 1940 season
No.	Name	Position	College	Notes
-	Steve Banas	fullback	Notre Dame	played for Philadelphia Eagles, Detroit Lions
-	Bing Binkowski	fullback-quarterback	-	-
40	Henry Bogacki	center-guard	Canisius	played for New York Yankees (1936 AFL) and Rochester Tigers
-	Dan Bukovich	guard	Toledo	-
-	Alex Drobnitch	guard-tackle	Denver	Indians kicker (all league 1940); also played for New York Yankees (1940 AFL), New York Americans
-	Jack "Cowboy" Farris	halfback	Wyoming	-
-	Johnny Fedorchak	back-tackle	Duquesne	-
6	Steve Gilbert	end	St. Bonaventure	played basketball for Socony Vacuum
-	Art Gottlieb	halfback-fullback-quarterback	Rutgers	-
28	Steve Hrycyszyn	quarterback-fullback-end	St. Bonaventure	name later changed to Steve Hersey
79	Ed Karp	tackle	Catholic University	born Ed Karpowich; played for Pittsburgh Steelers (all league 1940)
-	Bill Koepsell	halfback	Pennsylvania	-
43	Carl "Moon Eyes" Littlefield	halfback-fullback	Washington State	played for Pittsburgh Steelers, Cleveland Rams
32	Maurice "Moose" McGrath	tackle-center	Niagara	played for Cleveland Rams
-	Joe Miller	end	Rochester	-
-	Lawrence "Moon" Mullins	halfback	Notre Dame	-
-	Orlando "Ole" Nesmith	halfback	Kansas	played for New York Yankees (1936 AFL); replaces Seick as coach in 1940
39	Walter "Horse" Padlo	guard	Duquesne	-
34	Larry Peace	halfback	Pittsburgh	played for Brooklyn Dodgers (NFL) in 1941
-	Hal "Mike" Pegg	center	Bucknell	-
44	Alec Shellogg	tackle	Notre Dame	played for Brooklyn Dodgers (NFL), Chicago Bears
-	Ed Siminski	end-tackle	Bowling Green	-
-	Earl "Red" Sieck	guard	Buffalo, Manhattan	team business manager, coach (games 1–5)
-	Dan Snell	end	-	-
-	John "Turk" Stylianos	halfback	Temple	-
14	Joe Szur	halfback-quarterback	Canisius	-
-	Russ Wile	end	Minnesota	played for Los Angeles Bulldogs
-	Wid Worthington	back	Washington and Lee	-

Roster of Buffalo Tigers - 1941 season
Name	Position	College	Notes
Steve Banas	fullback	Notre Dame	played for Philadelphia Eagles, Detroit Lions
Sherm Barnes	end	Baylor	played for Milwaukee Chiefs
Ed Blodzinski	guard	Canisius	-
Henry Bogacki	center	Canisius	played for New York Yankees (1936 AFL) and Rochester Tigers
Frank Bykowski	guard	Purdue	played for Pittsburgh Steelers
LeVant "Itch" Dahl	end	Canisius	-
John "Mike" Dolan	end	Montana	played for Kenosha Cardinals
Frank Durkin	back	-	-
Ralph Elliot	tackle	-	-
Andy Hlat	-	-	-
Bob Holstrom	back	Detroit Tech	played for Boston Bears, Milwaukee Chiefs
Steve Hrycyszyn	quarterback-end	St. Bonaventure	name later changed to Steve Hersey
Edmond "Bud" Hughes	end	-	-
Andy Karpus	halfback	Detroit	played for New York Yankees and Los Angeles Bulldogs of AFL II, Boston Bears and New York Yankees of AFL III
Leon Losey	back	-	-
Hank Luebcke	tackle	Iowa	-
Butch Mastriola	guard	N. C. State	played with Boston Bears
Malcolm McLain	-	St. Bonaventure	-
Johnny "Blood" McNally	back	St. John's College	Member, Pro Football Hall of Fame
Dan Morabito	tackle	Michigan State	-
Clem Naughton	end	DePaul	also played for Kenosha Cardinals
Merle Osborne	fullback	Iowa State	-
Joe Ratica	center-guard	St. Vincent	also played for Brooklyn Dodgers (NFL) and Boston Bears (AFL)
Roy Russell	end-tackle	-	-
Alec Shellogg	tackle	Notre Dame	played for Brooklyn Dodgers (NFL), Chicago Bears
Louis "Tex" Tolliver	halfback	-	played for Wilmington in American Association in 1940
Nick Toth	guard	Canisius	-
Bill Valiquette	halfback	Georgetown	-
Ernie Wheeler	halfback	North Dakota State	also played with Pittsburgh Steelers, Chicago Cardinals, Boston Bears (AFL), Kenosha Cardinals
Larry Yurkonis	halfback	Niagara	-
