= 1940 American Football League season =

The 1940 AFL season was the first season of the third American Football League. The league was formed when the New York Yankees, Boston Bears, and Buffalo Indians were joined by the Cincinnati Bengals, Columbus Bullies, and Milwaukee Chiefs of the minor American Professional Football Association (the mass defection doomed the minor league). After the announcement of the formation of the AFL (July 14, 1940), applications for membership by former APFA members St. Louis Gunners and Kenosha Cardinals were rejected by the upstart league, which started with six members.

The Columbus Bullies were declared league champions after compiling an 8-1-1 record, just edging the 7-2 of the Milwaukee Chiefs.

== Final standings ==
W = Wins, L = Losses, T = Ties, Pct.= Winning Percentage, PF = Points for, PA = Points against

=== Final 1940 standings ===
| Team | W | L | T | Pct. | PF | PA |
|---|---|---|---|---|---|---|
| Columbus Bullies | 8 | 1 | 1 | .889 | 134 | 69 |
| Milwaukee Chiefs | 7 | 2 | 0 | .778 | 180 | 59 |
| Boston Bears | 5 | 4 | 1 | .556 | 120 | 79 |
| New York Yankees | 4 | 5 | 0 | .444 | 138 | 138 |
| Buffalo Indians | 2 | 8 | 0 | .200 | 45 | 138 |
| Cincinnati Bengals | 1 | 7 | 0 | .125 | 53 | 187 |

The standings include two forfeits: Buffalo forfeited to New York due to the field being deemed unplayable on November 17, 1940, while Cincinnati forfeited to Buffalo on November 24, 1940 due to injuries leaving the Bengals unable to field a team.

Results of AFL games - 1940 season

WEEK ONE

15 September, Red Bird Stadium, Columbus, Ohio: Milwaukee Chiefs 14, Columbus Bullies 2

WEEK TWO

22 September, Civic Stadium, Buffalo, New York: Milwaukee Chiefs 23, Buffalo Tigers 0

WEEK THREE

29 September, Civic Stadium, Buffalo: Buffalo Tigers 17, Cincinnati Bengals 7

WEEK FOUR

6 October, Fenway Park, Boston, Massachusetts: Boston Bears 29, Cincinnati Bengals 7
6 October, Yankee Stadium, New York: Columbus Bullies 23. New York Yankees 13
9 October, Civic Stadium, Buffalo: Columbus Bullies 17, Buffalo Tigers 7
9 October, Yankee Stadium, New York: New York Yankees 40, Cincinnati Bengals 13

WEEK FIVE

13 October, Fenway Park, Boston: Boston Bears 28, New York Yankees 7
13 October, Dairy Bowl, Milwaukee, Wisconsin: Milwaukee Chiefs 49, Cincinnati Bengals 0
16 October, Red Bird Stadium, Columbus: Columbus Bullies 7, Milwaukee Chiefs 3
16 October, Civic Stadium, Buffalo: Boston Bears 10, Buffalo Tigers 0

WEEK SIX

20 October, Fenway Park, Boston: Boston Bears 20, Buffalo Tigers 0
20 October, Yankee Stadium, New York: New York Yankees 30, Milwaukee Chiefs 7

WEEK SEVEN

27 October, Fenway Park, Boston: Milwaukee Chiefs 14, Boston Bears 0
27 October, Red Bird Stadium, Columbus: Columbus Bullies 17, Cincinnati Bengals 7

WEEK EIGHT

3 November, Crosley Field, Cincinnati: Columbus Bullies 21, Cincinnati Bengals 2
3 November, Dairy Bowl, Milwaukee: Milwaukee Chiefs 10, Boston Bears 0
3 November, Yankee Stadium, New York: New York Yankees 17, Buffalo Tigers 0

WEEK NINE

10 November, Red Bird Stadium, Columbus: Columbus Bullies 13. Buffalo Tigers 7
10 November, Dairy Bowl, Milwaukee: Milwaukee Chiefs 30, New York Yankees 7
11 November, Crosley Field, Cincinnati: Cincinnati Bengals 17, Boston Bears 13

WEEK TEN

17 November, Civic Stadium, Buffalo: New York Yankees 1, Buffalo Tigers 0 (forfeit – unplayable field)
17 November, Red Bird Stadium, Columbus: Boston Bears 0, Columbus Bullies 0 (tie)
21 November, Red Bird Stadium, Columbus: Columbus 17, New York Yankees 16
21 November, Dairy Bowl, Milwaukee: Milwaukee Chiefs 30, Buffalo Tigers 13
21 November, Yankee Stadium, New York: Boston Bears 20, New York Yankees 7

WEEK ELEVEN

24 November, Crosley Field, Cincinnati: Buffalo Tigers 1, Cincinnati Bengals 0 (forfeit – Bengals unable to field team)

Note: Two scheduled games were cancelled: New York-Cincinnati and Milwaukee-Cincinnati (both games scheduled to have been played in Cincinnati)

==== 1940 All-League Team ====
The league's coaches selected the all-league team:

1940 AFL All-League Teams
| Position | First Team | Second Team |
|---|---|---|
| End | Sherman Barnes, Milwaukee | Keith Ranspot, Boston |
| End | Harlan Gustafson, New York | Joel Mason, Boston |
| Tackle | Ed Karpowich, Buffalo | Ralph Niehaus, Columbus |
| Tackle | Bob Eckl, Milwaukee | Alec Shellogg, Buffalo |
| Guard | Jim Karcher, Columbus | Vic Marino, Boston |
| Guard | Alex Drobnitch, Buffalo | Len Akin, Milwaukee |
| Center | Joe Alexus, Columbus | Joe Ratica, Boston |
| Back | Andy Karpus, Boston, QB | Bob Davis, Columbus |
| Back | Bill Hutchinson, New York, HB | Ray Cole, Milwaukee |
| Back | Nelson Peterson, Columbus, HB | Lee Elkins, New York |
| Back | Al Novakofski, Milwaukee, FB | Paul Shu, Cincinnati |

== See also ==
- 1940 NFL season
- 1941 American Football League season
