= Warren Kilbourne =

American football player (1916–1967)

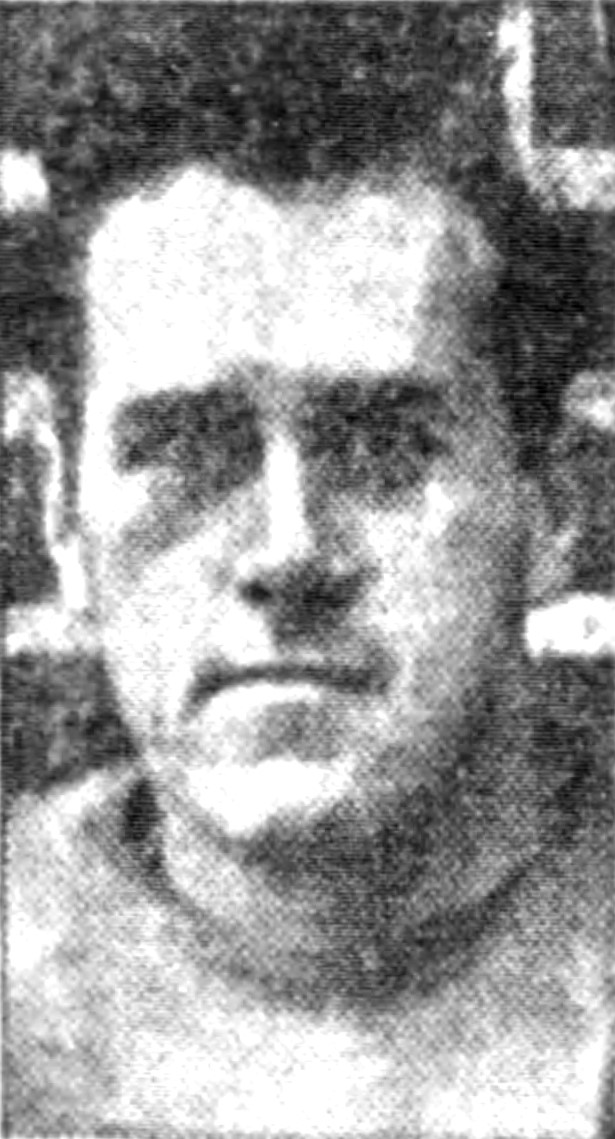
- Kilbourne in the Minneapolis Star Tribune in 1938

No. 58, 41
- Position: Tackle

Personal information
- Born: June 20, 1916; Saint Paul, Minnesota, U.S.
- Died: May 16, 1967 (aged 50); Ramsey County, Minnesota, U.S.
- Listed height: 6 ft 3 in (1.91 m)
- Listed weight: 240 lb (109 kg)

Career information
- High school: Humboldt (Saint Paul, Minnesota)
- College: Minnesota (1935–1938)
- NFL draft: 1939: undrafted

Career history
- Green Bay Packers (1939–1940); → Kenosha Cardinals (1939); → St. Louis Gunners (1940); Buffalo Indians (1940); New York Yankees (1940); Cincinnati Bengals (1941)

Awards and highlights
- NFL champion (1939); National champion (1936)

Career NFL statistics
- Games played: 4
- Stats at Pro Football Reference

Warren William Kilbourne (June 20, 1916 – May 16, 1967) was an American professional football player. A tackle, he played college football for the Minnesota Golden Gophers and then three seasons professionally. He was a member of the Green Bay Packers of the National Football League (NFL), the Kenosha Cardinals, Buffalo Indians, New York Yankees and Cincinnati Bengals of the American Football League (AFL), and the St. Louis Gunners.

== Early life ==
Kilbourne was born on June 20, 1916, in Saint Paul, Minnesota. His father served as the director of physical education in the Saint Paul public schools system. He attended Humboldt High School where he competed in three sports and received seven varsity letters, three each in football and basketball, and one in baseball. He played football as a tackle, basketball as a forward, and baseball as a first baseman. After high school, Kilbourne enrolled at the College of St. Thomas, where he attended half a year before transferring to the University of Minnesota.

== College career ==
Kilbourne joined Minnesota in 1935 and was a member of the freshman football team that year. The Star Tribune described him as "the energetic type of lineman who seems to enjoy his work. He's powerful and ... gets around with pleasing quickness." Although he was not a standout for the freshman team, he impressed in practices as a sophomore and made the varsity team in 1936. He contributed to the team's 7–1 record and national championship in the 1936 season. He received a letter for the 1936 season and remained with the varsity team in 1937 and 1938, being a starter at right tackle as a senior. He helped Minnesota win the Big Ten Conference championship in the 1937 and 1938 seasons. In his collegiate career, he was always used on the right side of the line, and in addition to tackle, also saw action at guard as a senior in 1938.

== Professional career ==
Kilbourne signed with the Green Bay Packers of the National Football League (NFL) in June 1939. At 230 pounds (100 kg) and 6 feet 2 inches (1.88 m), he was one of the biggest players on the team. He appeared in four games as a backup during the 1939 season before being released by the Packers near the end of October. The Packers went on to win the 1939 NFL Championship. After being released by the Packers, Kilbourne concluded the 1939 season with the minor league Kenosha Cardinals, appearing in six games. He initially returned to the Packers for the 1940 season, but was then sent to the St. Louis Gunners after not making the team. At the start of the 1940 season, the Gunners played a charity practice game, but did not pay their players for it. Kilbourne, upset at not being paid, led a strike that resulted in him and two others quitting the team.

In October 1940, Kilbourne signed with the Buffalo Indians of the American Football League (AFL). He did not appear in any games for the Indians and that same season joined the New York Yankees, appearing in two games for them. In 1941, he played for the Cincinnati Bengals in the AFL.

== Later life and death ==
After his stint with the Bengals, Kilbourne joined the United States Army and served 18 months, stationed at Fort Knox, before being discharged due to illness. By 1949, he was working part-time at the University of Minnesota. He died on May 16, 1967, aged 50, in Ramsey County, Minnesota.
