= 1941 American Football League season =

The 1941 AFL season was the second and final season of the third American Football League. After deeming the 1940 season to be a success, the league made overtures of expansion, even going to the point of having a press conference to announce the addition of new teams (July), but when the press conference was held, the Boston Bears had withdrawn from the league and the new Detroit franchise deferred entry for the 1942 season (interests representing Philadelphia and Baltimore also applied for membership and were denied).

The New York Yankees were sold to promoter and agent Douglas Hertz in January; by mid-summer, the AFL revoked the franchise in light of controversies involving Hertz’s finances. A syndicate headed by William Cox was awarded the franchise in August, but Hertz kept the name for his new independent team (which later in the season became a traveling team in the American Association). Cox and the new owners of the AFL franchise redubbed the team the Americans. In Buffalo, a less contentious change of ownership resulted in the Indians becoming the Tigers.

The Columbus Bullies successfully defended their 1940 AFL championship. Their 5-1-2 record edged the 5-2-1 of the Americans and the 4-3-1 of the Milwaukee Chiefs.

At the beginning of the 1941 season, the Bullies accepted a challenge from the defending Western Interprovincial Football Union champion Winnipeg Blue Bombers for a three-game series; the Bombers had been banned from Grey Cup contention that year due to rules discrepancies between the WIFU and the other organizations playing Canadian football at the time. The Bullies and Blue Bombers played three games, at least partially by Canadian rules (as one of the games, the deciding third game, has Winnipeg's final score as 1 point, which is not possible in the American game). Columbus won the series, 2-1; Winnipeg won the first game 19-12, but Columbus won the next two, 6-0 and 31-1.

== Final standings ==
W = Wins, L = Losses, T = Ties, Pct.= Winning Percentage, PF = Points for, AP = Points against

| Team | W | L | T | Pct. | Off. | Def. |
|---|---|---|---|---|---|---|
| Columbus Bullies | 5 | 1 | 2 | .833 | 142 | 55 |
| New York Americans | 5 | 2 | 1 | .714 | 116 | 73 |
| Milwaukee Chiefs | 4 | 3 | 1 | .571 | 105 | 84 |
| Buffalo Tigers | 2 | 6 | 0 | .250 | 72 | 172 |
| Cincinnati Bengals | 1 | 5 | 2 | .167 | 69 | 120 |

=== 1941 All-League Team ===
The league's coaches selected the all-league team:

1941 AFL All-League Teams
| Position | First Team | Second Team |
|---|---|---|
| End | Earl Ohlgren, Milwaukee | Wayland Becker, Columbus |
| End | Joe Kruse, Cincinnati | Len Thom, Columbus |
| Tackle | Alec Shellogg, Buffalo | Ralph Niehaus, Columbus |
| Tackle | Bob Eckl, Milwaukee | Nick Drahos, New York |
| Guard | Ted Livinston, Columbus | Merle Larson, Milwaukee |
| Guard | Len Akin, Milwaukee | Tom Byrd, New York |
| Center | Paul Humphrey, Milwaukee | Nick Padgen, Columbus |
| Quarterback | Bob Davis, Columbus, QB | Jack Hinkle, New York |
| Halfback | Charley Armstrong, New York, HB | Nelson Peterson, Columbus |
| Halfback | Bill McGannon, Cincinnati, HB | Gene Tornquist, Cincinnati |
| Fullback | John Kimbrough, New York, FB | Howie Weiss, Milwaukee |

Results of AFL games - 1941 season
- Week 1
  - Sun. Sep. 14 ... Columbus Bullies 34, Milwaukee Chiefs 7 (at Milwaukee)
- Week 2
  - Sun. Sep. 28 ... New York Americans 10, Milwaukee Chiefs 3 (at Milwaukee)
- Week 3
  - Sun. Oct. 5 ... Columbus Bullies 14, New York Americans 0 (at Columbus)
  - Sun. Oct. 5 ... Cincinnati Bengals 29, Buffalo Tigers 0 (at Cincinnati)
- Week 4
  - Wed. Oct. 8 ... New York Americans 26, Buffalo Tigers 7 (at Buffalo) (n.)
  - Sun. Oct. 12 ... Columbus Bullies 14, Milwaukee Chiefs 7 (at Columbus)
  - Sun. Oct. 12 ... New York Americans 23, Cincinnati Bengals 14 (at Cincinnati) (n.)
- Week 5
  - Wed. Oct. 15 ... Columbus Bullies 35, Cincinnati Bengals 6 (at Akron) (n.)
  - Sun. Oct. 19 ... New York Americans 7, Columbus Bullies 7 (at New York) (tie)
  - Sun. Oct. 19 ... Buffalo Tigers 16, Cincinnati Bengals 0 (at Buffalo)
- Week 6
  - Sun. Oct. 26 ... New York Americans 31, Buffalo Tigers 14 (at New York)
  - Sun. Oct. 26 ... Milwaukee Chiefs 26, Cincinnati Bengals 6 (at Cincinnati)
- Week 7
  - Sun. Nov. 2 ... Milwaukee Chiefs 7, New York Americans 6 (at New York)
  - Sun. Nov. 2 ... Columbus Bullies 24, Buffalo Tigers 7 (at Columbus)
- Week 8
  - Sun. Nov. 9 ... Buffalo Tigers 14, Columbus Bullies 7 (at Buffalo)
  - Sun. Nov. 9 ... Milwaukee Chiefs 0, Cincinnati Bengals 0 (at Milwaukee) (tie)
- Week 9
  - Sun. Nov. 16 ... Columbus Bullies 7, Cincinnati Bengals 7 (at Columbus) (tie)
  - Sun. Nov. 16 ... Milwaukee Chiefs 41, Buffalo Tigers 14 (at Milwaukee)
- Week 10
  - Sun. Nov. 23 ... Milwaukee Chiefs 14, Buffalo Tigers 0 (at Buffalo)
- Week 11
  - Sun. Nov. 30 ... New York Americans 13, Cincinnati Bengals 7 (at New York)

== After the 1941 season ==
Precisely one week after the last regular season AFL game --- Sunday, December 7, 1941 --- Pearl Harbor was attacked by Japanese military forces. The euphoria of a successful season gave way to the realization that the military demands of the American participation in World War II would put the continued success of the AFL (and the NFL, for that matter) into question. As both major football leagues were losing personnel to military service, both made plans for a 1942 season (the AFL as a six team loop with a new Detroit franchise). Ironically, the NFL came close to suspending operations, but continued as a ten-team league, but on September 2, 1942, the AFL suspended operations “until the end of the war.” AFL president William Cox announced the suspension, stating “We do not have the time to go into the football business this fall. I want to stress that there is no financial problem involved. Each team definitely has enough finances to continue.”

The league did not return after the end of World War II. In 1946, a minor league, the American Association, appropriated the American Football League name for itself, and the All-America Football Conference replaced the suspended league as the primary rival of the National Football League.

== See also ==
- 1941 NFL season
- 1940 American Football League season
