= List of Arizona Cardinals first-round draft picks =

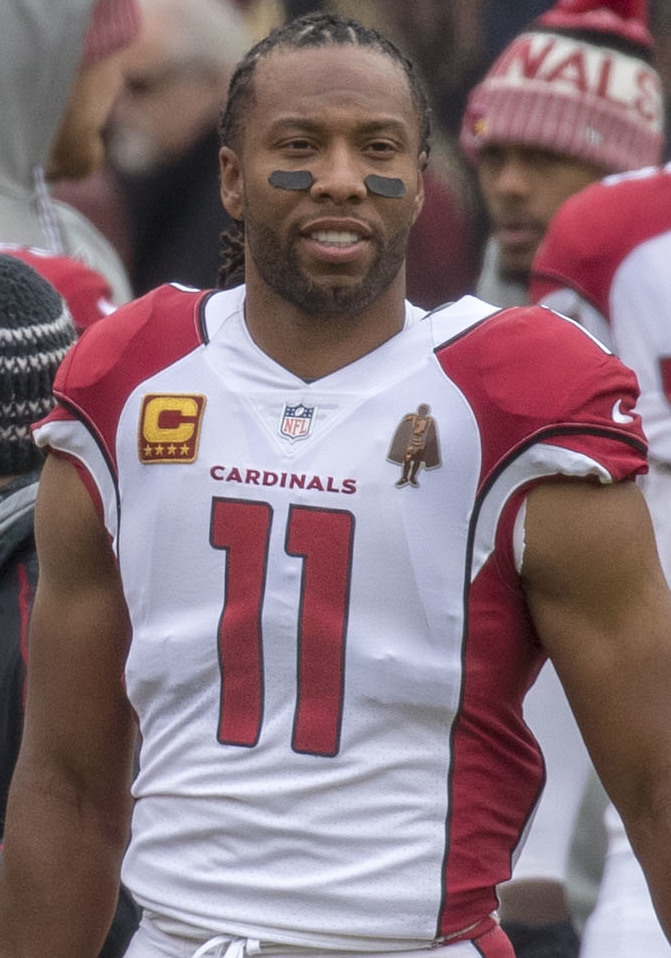
Wide receiver Larry Fitzgerald was drafted 3rd overall by the Cardinals in the 2004 NFL draft. Fitzgerald spent his entire career, 17 seasons, with the team and was a three-time All-Pro, 11-time Pro Bowler, and was the 2016 Walter Payton NFL Man of the Year Award. He is currently second all-time in career receiving yards and was selected for the NFL 100th Anniversary All-Time Team.

The Arizona Cardinals are a professional American football team based in the Phoenix metropolitan area. The Cardinals compete in the National Football League (NFL) as a member of the National Football Conference West Division. The team was established in Chicago in 1898 as the Morgan Athletic Club and is the oldest continuously run professional football franchise. They joined the NFL as a charter member on September 17, 1920, as the Chicago Cardinals. In 1960, the team moved to St. Louis, Missouri, where it became the St. Louis Cardinals. Before the 1988 season, the team moved to Tempe, Arizona, and played home games for the next 18 seasons at Sun Devil Stadium on the campus of Arizona State University. In 1994, after being known as the Phoenix Cardinals from 1988 to 1993, they became the Arizona Cardinals. In 2006, the team moved their home games to State Farm Stadium (then known as University of Phoenix Stadium), where they have played their home games since. The team was purchased by Charles Bidwill in 1932 and has been owned by a member of the Bidwill family since, with Charles' grandson Michael Bidwill being the current owner.

The NFL draft, officially known as the "NFL Annual Player Selection Meeting", is an annual event which serves as the league's most common source of player recruitment. The draft order is determined based on the previous season's standings; the teams with the worst win–loss records receive the earliest picks. Teams that qualified for the NFL playoffs select after non-qualifiers, and their order depends on how far they advanced, using their regular season record as a tie-breaker. The final two selections in the first round are reserved for the Super Bowl runner-up and champion. Draft picks are tradable and players or other picks can be acquired with them.

In 1936, the league introduced the NFL draft after team owners voted on it in 1935. The intention of the draft is to make the NFL more competitive, as some teams had an advantage in signing players. From 1947 through 1958, the NFL designated the first overall selection as a "bonus" or "lottery pick". The pick was awarded by a random draw and the winner who received the "bonus pick" forfeited its selection in the final round of the draft and became ineligible for future draws. The system was abolished prior to the 1959 NFL draft, as all twelve teams in the league at the time had received a bonus choice.

Since the first draft, the Cardinals have selected 95 players in the first round. The team's first-round pick in the inaugural NFL draft was Jimmy Lawrence, a back from Texas Christian University; he was the 5th overall selection. The Cardinals have selected first overall five times and selected Ki Aldrich in 1939, George Cafego in 1940, Charley Trippi in 1945, King Hill in 1958, and Kyler Murray in 2019. In the most recent draft, held in 2026, the Cardinals selected Notre Dame running back Jeremiyah Love.

The Cardinals did not draft a player in the first round on five occasions. Four of the team's first-round picks—Ollie Matson, Joe Namath, Charley Trippi, and Roger Wehrli—have been elected to the Pro Football Hall of Fame. The Cardinals have used seven first-round picks on players—Glenn Dobbs, Dub Jones, John Kimbrough, Carl McAdams, Joe Namath, Ken Rice, Jim Spavital—who chose to sign with competing leagues instead.

== Player selections ==
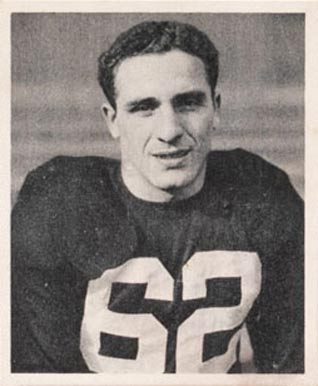
Charley Trippi was drafted by the Cardinals in the 1947 NFL draft and spent his whole career with the team. Trippi, an All-Pro, two-time Pro Bowler, and member of the 1940s All-Decade Team, was inducted into the Pro Football Hall of Fame in 1968.

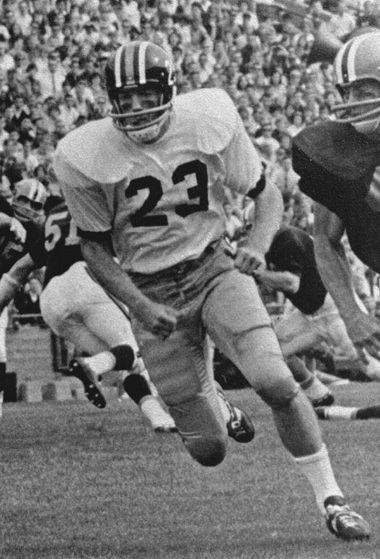
Roger Wehrli was drafted in the 1969 draft as a defensive back and spent his whole career with the Cardinals. Wehrli was a five-time first-team All-Pro, seven-time Pro Bowler, member of the Arizona Cardinals Ring of Honor, and was selected to the 1970s All-Decade Team. He was inducted into the Pro Football Hall of Fame in 2007.

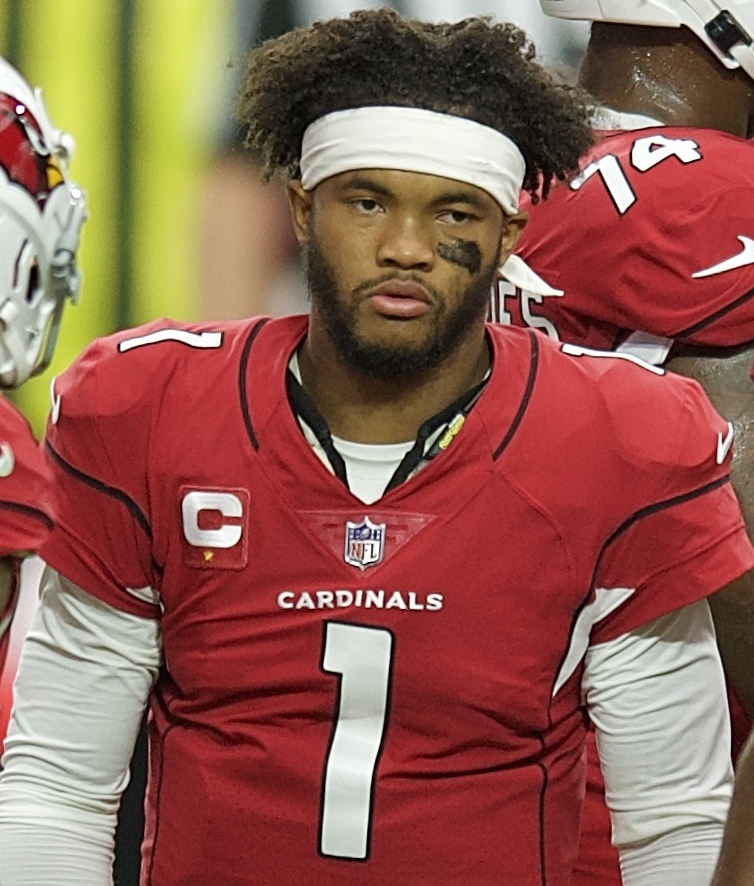
Quarterback Kyler Murray was drafted first overall in the 2019 NFL draft. Murray is a two-time Pro Bowler and was the 2019 Offensive Rookie of the Year.

Key
Symbol	Meaning
†	Inducted into the Pro Football Hall of Fame
*	Selected number one overall
‡	Selected number one overall and inducted into the Pro Football Hall of Fame

Position abbreviations
B	Back
C	Center
DB	Defensive back
DE	Defensive end
DT	Defensive tackle
E	End
FB	Fullback
G	Guard
HB	Halfback
K	Placekicker
LB	Linebacker
QB	Quarterback
RB	Running back
T	Tackle
TB	Tailback
TE	Tight end
WB	Wingback
WR	Wide receiver

Arizona Cardinals (Note: The Arizona Cardinals were previously known as the Chicago Cardinals (1920–1959), St. Louis Cardinals (1960–1987), and Phoenix Cardinals (1988–1993).) first-round draft picks
Season	Pick	Player	Position	College	Notes
1936	5	Jimmy Lawrence	B	TCU	
1937	3	Ray Buivid	B	Marquette	Never played for the team
1938	5	Jack Robbins	TB	Arkansas	
1939	1	Ki Aldrich*	C	TCU	
1940	1	George Cafego*	FB	Tennessee	Never played for team (Note: Arizona traded back George Cafego and defensive back Ben Kish to the Brooklyn Dodgers in exchange for offensive linemen Ed Beinor and Joe Kuharich.)
1941	2	John Kimbrough	FB	Texas A&M	Signed for the New York Yankees of the AFL III instead
1942	4	Steve Lach	WB	Duke	
1943	3	Glenn Dobbs	TB	Tulsa	Signed for the AAFC's Brooklyn Dodgers instead (Note: Glenn Dobbs's career was delayed by military service. Upon returning from service, Dobbs signed with the Brooklyn Dodgers of the AAFC.)
1944	2	Pat Harder	FB	Wisconsin	
1945	1	Charley Trippi‡	HB	Georgia	
1946	2	Dub Jones	HB	LSU	Signed for the AAFC's Brooklyn Dodgers instead
1947	7	Tex Coulter	T	Army	
1948	11	Jim Spavital	FB	Oklahoma	Signed for the AAFC's Los Angeles Dons instead
1949	10	Bill Fischer	T	Notre Dame	
1950	No pick				Pick traded to Los Angeles Rams (Note: Arizona traded their 1950 first-round selection (No. 9 overall) and cash to the Los Angeles Rams in exchange for quarterback Jim Hardy.)
1951	6	Jerry Groom	G	Notre Dame	
1952	3	Ollie Matson†	RB	San Francisco	
1953	4	Johnny Olszewski	FB	California	
1954	2	Lamar McHan	QB	Arkansas	
1955	2	Max Boydston	E	Oklahoma	
1956	7	Joe Childress	HB	Auburn	
1957	10	Jerry Tubbs	LB	Oklahoma	
1958	1	King Hill*	QB	Rice	Lottery bonus pick
1958	2	John David Crow	HB	Texas A&M	
1959	3	Billy Stacy	DB	Mississippi State	
1960	2	George Izo	QB	Notre Dame	
1961	8	Ken Rice	T	Auburn	Signed for the AFL's Buffalo Bills instead
1962	6	Fate Echols	T	Northwestern	
1962	12	Irv Goode	C	Kentucky	Pick received from Philadelphia Eagles (Note: Arizona traded quarterback King Hill to the Philadelphia Eagles in exchange for their 1962 first-round selection (No. 12 overall).)
1963	2	Jerry Stovall	DB	LSU	
1963	13	Don Brumm	DE	Purdue	Pick received from New York Giants (Note: Arizona traded quarterback Ralph Guglielmi to the New York Giants in exchange for their 1963 first-round selection (No. 13 overall) and fullback Bill Triplett.)
1964	9	Ken Kortas	DT	Louisville	
1965	12	Joe Namath†	QB	Alabama	Signed for the AFL's New York Jets instead
1966	8	Carl McAdams	LB	Oklahoma	Signed for the AFL's New York Jets instead
1967	16	Dave Williams	WR	Washington	
1968	13	MacArthur Lane	RB	Utah State	
1969	19	Roger Wehrli†	DB	Missouri	
1970	8	Larry Stegent	RB	Texas A&M	
1971	17	Norm Thompson	DB	Utah	
1972	4	Ahmad Rashad	RB	Oregon	
1973	5	Dave Butz	DT	Purdue	
1974	7	J. V. Cain	TE	Colorado	
1975	21	Tim Gray	DB	Texas A&M	
1976	22	Mike Dawson	DT	Arizona	
1977	19	Steve Pisarkiewicz	QB	Missouri	Original pick traded to Atlanta Falcons. (Note: Arizona traded their 1977 first-round selection (No. 20 overall) and guard Greg Kindle to the Atlanta Falcons in exchange for defensive end John Zook.) Pick received from Washington Redskins. (Note: As compensation for defensive tackle Dave Butz, and as a result of the Rozelle Rule, Arizona received the Washington Redskins' 1977 first-round selection (No. 19 overall), 1978 first-round selection (No. 19 overall), and 1979 second-round selection (No.42 overall).)
1978	15	Steve Little	K	Arkansas	
1978	19	Ken Greene	DB	Washington State	Pick received from Washington Redskins
1979	8	Ottis Anderson	RB	Miami (FL)	
1980	6	Curtis Greer	DE	Michigan	
1981	5	E. J. Junior	LB	Alabama	
1982	16	Luis Sharpe	T	UCLA	Moved down draft order in trade with Kansas City Chiefs (Note: Arizona traded their 1982 first-round selection (No. 11 overall) to the Kansas City Chiefs in exchange for their 1982 first- and third-round selections (Nos. 16 and 73 overall).)
1983	17	Leonard Smith	DB	McNeese State	
1984	17	Clyde Duncan	WR	Tennessee	
1985	18	Freddie Joe Nunn	LB	Ole Miss	
1986	5	Anthony Bell	LB	Michigan State	
1987	6	Kelly Stouffer	QB	Colorado State	
1988	12	Ken Harvey	LB	California	
1989	10	Eric Hill	LB	LSU	
1989	17	Joe Wolf	G	Boston College	Pick received from Seattle Seahawks (Note: Arizona traded quarterback Kelly Stouffer to the Seattle Seahawks in exchange for their 1988 first-round selection (No. 120 overall) and 1989 first- and fifth-round selections (Nos. 17 and 128 overall).)
1990	No pick				Pick used in 1989 supplemental draft (Note: Pick exercised in 1989 supplemental draft. As a result, the Cardinals lost their 1990 first-round selection.)
1991	6	Eric Swann	DE	None	
1992	No pick				Pick traded to Miami Dolphins (Note: Arizona traded their 1992 first-round selection (No. 7 overall) to the Miami Dolphins in exchange for wide receiver Randal Hill.)
1993	3	Garrison Hearst	RB	Georgia	Moved up draft order in trade with New York Jets (Note: Arizona traded their 1993 first-round selection (No. 4 overall) and running back Johnny Johnson to the New York Jets in exchange for their 1993 first-round selection (No. 3 overall).)
1993	18	Ernest Dye	T	South Carolina	Pick received from NFL. (Note: Arizona received a 1993 first-round selection (No. 20 overall) as compensation for free agent defensive back Tim McDonald. The NFL added an additional pick to the first-round for Arizona.) Moved up draft order in trade with San Francisco 49ers. (Note: Arizona traded a 1993 first-, received as compensation from the NFL, and fifth-round selection (Nos. 20 and 116 overall) to the San Francisco 49ers in exchange for their 1993 first-round selection (No. 18 overall).)
1994	10	Jamir Miller	LB	UCLA	
1995	No pick				Pick traded to New York Jets (Note: Arizona traded their 1995 first- and fourth-round selections (Nos. 16 and 106 overall) and running back Ronald Moore to the New York Jets in exchange for wide receiver Rob Moore.)
1996	3	Simeon Rice	DE	Illinois	
1997	9	Tom Knight	DB	Iowa	
1998	3	Andre Wadsworth	DE	Florida State	Moved down draft order in trade with San Diego Chargers (Note: Arizona traded their 1998 first-round selection (No. 2 overall) to the San Diego Chargers in exchange for their 1998 first- and second-round selections (Nos. 3 and 33 overall), 1999 first-round selection (No. 8 overall), linebacker Patrick Sapp, and wide receiver Eric Metcalf.)
1999	8	David Boston	WR	Ohio State	Pick received from San Diego Chargers
1999	21	L. J. Shelton	T	Eastern Michigan	
2000	7	Thomas Jones	RB	Virginia	
2001	2	Leonard Davis	T	Texas	
2002	12	Wendell Bryant	DT	Wisconsin	
2003	17	Bryant Johnson	WR	Penn State	Moved down draft order in trade with New Orleans Saints (Note: Arizona traded their 2003 first-, second-, and third-round selections (Nos. 6, 37, and 102 ovreall) to the New Orleans Saints in exchange for two 2003 first-round selections and a second-round selection (Nos. 17, 18, and 54 overall).)
2003	18	Calvin Pace	DE	Wake Forest	Pick received from New Orleans Saints
2004	3	Larry Fitzgerald†	WR	Pittsburgh	
2005	8	Antrel Rolle	DB	Miami (FL)	
2006	10	Matt Leinart	QB	USC	
2007	5	Levi Brown	T	Penn State	
2008	16	Dominique Rodgers-Cromartie	DB	Tennessee State	
2009	31	Beanie Wells	RB	Ohio State	
2010	26	Dan Williams	DT	Tennessee	
2011	5	Patrick Peterson	DB	LSU	
2012	13	Michael Floyd	WR	Notre Dame	
2013	7	Jonathan Cooper	G	North Carolina	
2014	27	Deone Bucannon	DB	Washington State	
2015	24	D. J. Humphries	T	Florida	
2016	29	Robert Nkemdiche	DT	Ole Miss	
2017	13	Haason Reddick	LB	Temple	
2018	10	Josh Rosen	QB	UCLA	Moved up draft order in trade with Oakland Raiders (Note: Arizona traded their 2018 first-, third-, and fifth-round selections (Nos. 15, 79, and 152 overall) to the Oakland Raiders in exchange for their 2018 first-round selection (No. 10 overall).)
2019	1	Kyler Murray*	QB	Oklahoma	
2020	8	Isaiah Simmons	LB	Clemson	
2021	16	Zaven Collins	LB	Tulsa	
2022	No pick				Pick traded to Baltimore Ravens (Note: Arizona traded their 2022 first-round selection (No. 23 overall) to the Baltimore Ravens in exchange for their 2022 third-round selection (No. 100 overall) and wide receiver Marquise Brown.)
2023	6	Paris Johnson Jr.	T	Ohio State	Moved down draft order in trade with Houston Texans. (Note: Arizona traded their 2023 first- and fourth-round selections (Nos. 3 and 105 overall) to the Houston Texans in exchange for their 2023 first- and second-round selections (Nos. 12 and 33 overall) and 2024 first- and third-round selections (Nos. 27 and 90 overall).) Moved up draft order in trade with Detroit Lions. (Note: Arizona traded a 2023 first-, received from the Houston Texans, second-, and fifth-round selections (Nos. 12, 34, and 168 overall) to the Detroit Lions in exchange for their 2023 first- and third-round selections (Nos. 6 and 81 overall).)
2024	4	Marvin Harrison Jr.	WR	Ohio State	
2024	27	Darius Robinson	DE	Missouri	Pick received from Houston Texans
2025	16	Walter Nolen	DT	Ole Miss	
2026	3	Jeremiyah Love	RB	Notre Dame	

== See also ==
- History of the Arizona Cardinals
- List of Arizona Cardinals seasons
