= Cole Willging =

American football player and coach (1911–1973)

No. 37, 60, 41
- Position: End

Personal information
- Born: August 14, 1911; Norwood, Ohio, U.S.
- Died: March 10, 1973 (aged 61); Cincinnati, Ohio, U.S.
- Listed height: 6 ft 3 in (1.91 m)
- Listed weight: 205 lb (93 kg)

Career information
- High school: Norwood (OH)
- College: Xavier

Career history

Playing
- Cincinnati Reds (1934); Cincinnati Models (1935–1937); Cincinnati Bengals (1938–1940)

Coaching
- Cincinnati Models (1936–1937) Assistant coach

Awards and highlights
- All-Midwest Football League (1937)

Career statistics
- Games played: 4
- Stats at Pro Football Reference

Coleman G. Willging (August 14, 1911 – March 10, 1973) was an American football end who played one season in the National Football League (NFL) for the Cincinnati Reds. He also played in the Midwest Football League and AFL III as a member of the Cincinnati Models and Bengals. He was assistant coach of the Models from 1936 to 1937.

== Early life and education ==
Willging was born on August 14, 1911, in Norwood, Ohio. He attended Norwood High School in the late 1920s, where he was an all-state tackle. In 1930 he joined Xavier University, playing for their freshman team. He would play for their varsity team from 1931 to 1933, earning a varsity letter in his final two years. Following his senior year, Willging was named to the All-Ohio, All-Midwestern, and All-Catholic national rosters.

== Professional career ==
Willging joined the local Cincinnati Reds, of the National Football League (NFL) in 1934. He appeared in four games with the Reds, making two receptions for fourteen yards as an end. It would be his only NFL season, as the Reds forfeited their franchise near the end of the season. After the year he would join the Cincinnati Models of the Midwest Football League, appearing in 12 games over three seasons. He was named All-MWFL in 1937, after helping his team reach the league championship serving as starting guard/tackle and assistant coach. He joined the independent Cincinnati Bengals in 1938, playing in 11 games over three seasons. They were part of the Midwest Football League in 1939, and AFL III in 1940.

== Later life and death ==
Willging was part of the United States Navy during World War II. Afterwards he lived in Amberley village working as an Ohio claims investigator. His son, Dan, was the starting guard at Miami (Ohio) University in the early 1970s. Willging died on March 10, 1973, at the age of 61, following a heart attack.
