= Earl Ohlgren =

American football player (1918–1962)

No. 6, 23
- Position: End

Personal information
- Born: February 21, 1918; Cokato, Minnesota, U.S.
- Died: December 31, 1962 (aged 44)
- Listed height: 6 ft 2 in (1.88 m)
- Listed weight: 210 lb (95 kg)

Career information
- High school: Cokato
- College: Minnesota (1936–1939)
- NFL draft: 1940: undrafted

Career history
- Milwaukee Chiefs (1940); San Diego Bombers (1940); Milwaukee Chiefs (1941); Green Bay Packers (1942)

Career NFL statistics
- Games played: 2
- Stats at Pro Football Reference

Earl Ohlgren (February 21, 1918 – December 31, 1962) was an American professional football end. He played college football for the Minnesota Golden Gophers and then played professionally for three seasons. He was a member of the Milwaukee Chiefs of the American Football League (AFL), the San Diego Bombers of the Pacific Coast Professional Football League (PCFL), and the Green Bay Packers of the National Football League. He appeared in two NFL games with the Packers in 1942.

== Early life ==
Ohlgren was born on February 21, 1918, in Cokato, Minnesota. He attended Cokato High School where he played multiple sports, receiving a total of 14 varsity letters. In addition to playing football, he was also considered a "star" basketball player, according to the Star Tribune. After high school, he enrolled at the University of Minnesota in 1936. He joined the Minnesota Golden Gophers football team and played for the freshman squad that year. An end, he was described in the Tribune as having the perfect build for the position, as well as being "fast, long-armed and sure-handed ... [and] unusually well advanced in the intricacies of the position".

Ohlgren made the varsity team in 1937 and spent two seasons as a reserve end, being the top backup as a junior in 1938. He helped them win the Big Ten Conference title in the 1938 season. He played his final season for Minnesota in 1939, with the Golden Gophers compiling a record of 3–4–1.

== Professional career ==
After his collegiate career, Ohlgren signed to play professional football for the Milwaukee Chiefs of the American Football League (AFL) in 1940. He appeared in eight games, two as a starter – for the Chiefs that year – helping them place second in the AFL with a record of 7–2. He then signed with the San Diego Bombers of the Pacific Coast Professional Football League (PCFL), appearing in one game that same season. He returned to the Chiefs in 1941 and appeared in all eight games, catching two touchdown passes. He was unanimously named to the All-AFL team after the season.

In 1942, Ohlgren signed with the Green Bay Packers of the National Football League (NFL). In an exhibition against the Washington Redskins, he was injured and feared to have broken his neck, but was determined to be "suffering only from shock". He later returned to the Packers and appeared in two games during the 1942 season. He did not return to the Packers for the 1943 season and concluded his professional career.

== Later life and death ==
After his football career, Ohlgren worked as a manager for a creamery in Park Rapids, Minnesota. He had a son, Earl Jr., who also played football as an end in the early 1960s. He died on December 31, 1962, at the age of 44, from a heart attack.
