= Carl Littlefield =

American football player (1916–1988)

Profile
- Position: Back

Personal information
- Born: August 6, 1916; Plymouth, California, U.S.
- Died: May 23, 1988 (aged 71); Plymouth, California, U.S.
- Listed height: 6 ft 0 in (1.83 m)
- Listed weight: 200 lb (91 kg)

Career information
- College: Sacramento Junior College; Washington State

Career history
- Cleveland Rams (1938); Pittsburgh Pirates (1939–1940); Buffalo Indians (1940)

Career statistics
- Rushing yards: 210
- Rushing average: 3.6
- Rushing TDs: 0

Carl Lester Littlefield (August 6, 1916 – May 23, 1988) was an American football back who played from 1938 to 1940 in the National Football League (NFL) and third American Football League (AFL).

Born in Plymouth, California, Littlefield attended Sacramento Junior College, where he played fullback and was the team's punter. He then played as a fullback at Washington State, and the Associated Press called him "Probably the most sought-after player" among those who were not picked in the 1938 NFL draft. Littlefield went to the Cleveland Rams for the 1938 season, where he played in nine games and rushed 19 times for 69 yards; he also returned a fumble for his only NFL touchdown. After the season, the Rams traded him to the New York Giants for Jack Haden, but they released him and the Pittsburgh Pirates acquired Littlefield. In 1939 and 1940, he played for the Pirates, running for 141 yards in 39 attempts. In 1940, Littlefield also played for the AFL's Buffalo Indians.
