= Henry Obst =

American football player (1906–1975)

No. 22, 16
- Position: Guard

Personal information
- Born: December 23, 1906; Brooklyn, New York, U.S.
- Died: August 27, 1975 (aged 68); New York, New York, U.S.
- Listed height: 5 ft 11 in (1.80 m)
- Listed weight: 192 lb (87 kg)

Career information
- High school: Textile (New York City)
- College: Syracuse (1927–1930)

Career history
- Staten Island Stapletons (1931); Philadelphia Eagles (1933); New York Yankees (1936)
- Stats at Pro Football Reference

Henry D. Obst (December 23, 1906 – August 27, 1975) was an American professional football guard who played two seasons in the National Football League (NFL) with the Staten Island Stapletons and Philadelphia Eagles. He played college football at Syracuse University.

== Early life and college ==
Henry D. Obst was born on December 23, 1906, in Brooklyn, New York. (Note: Pro Football Archives claims he was born on December 12, 1909, in New York City.) He attended Textile High School in New York City.

He was a member of the Syracuse Orange from 1927 to 1930 and a three-year letterman from 1928 to 1930. He earned Associated Press honorable mention All-East honors his senior year in 1930.

== Professional career ==
Obst signed with the Staten Island Stapletons of the National Football League (NFL) in 1931. He appeared in two games, both starts at guard, for the team during the 1931 season.

He was signed by the Philadelphia Eagles of the NFL in 1933. He played in one game for the Eagles at end during the team's inaugural 1933 season before being released that year.

Obst played in two games, both starts at guard, for the New York Yankees of the American Football League in 1936.

== Personal life ==
Obst died on August 27, 1975, in New York City. (Note: Pro Football Archives claims he died on September 25, 1975, in Sun City, Arizona.)
