= Bill Steinkemper =

American football player (1913–1973)

No. 72, 35
- Position: Tackle

Personal information
- Born: December 27, 1913; Anna, Ohio, U.S.
- Died: November 26, 1973 (aged 59); Franklin Park, Illinois, U.S.
- Listed height: 6 ft 2 in (1.88 m)
- Listed weight: 220 lb (100 kg)

Career information
- High school: DePaul Academy (Chicago, Illinois)
- College: Notre Dame (1933–1936)
- NFL draft: 1937: undrafted

Career history
- Cincinnati Bengals (1937); Chicago Bears (1943)

Awards and highlights
- NFL champion (1943)
- Stats at Pro Football Reference

William Jacob Steinkemper (December 27, 1913 – November 26, 1973) was an American professional football tackle who played one season with the Chicago Bears of the National Football League (NFL). He played college football at the University of Notre Dame.

== Early life and college ==
William Jacob Steinkemper was born on December 27, 1913, in Anna, Ohio. He attended DePaul Academy in Chicago, Illinois.

He was a member of the Notre Dame Fighting Irish of the University of Notre Dame from 1933 to 1936 and a three-year letterman from 1934 to 1936.

== Professional career ==
After going undrafted in the 1937 NFL draft, Steinkemper started all eight games for the Cincinnati Bengals of the American Football League in 1937. The Bengals finished the season with a 2–4–2 record.

He later signed with the Chicago Bears of the National Football League in 1943. He played in all ten games, starting nine, for the Bears during the 1943 season. The Bears finished the regular season with a 8–1–1 record. He also played for the Bears in the 1943 NFL Championship Game, a 41–21 victory over the Washington Redskins. He became a free agent after the season.

== Personal life ==
Steinkemper served in the United States Navy. He died on November 26, 1973, in Franklin Park, Illinois.
