= List of Bucknell Bison in the NFL draft =

This is a list of Bucknell Bison football players in the NFL draft.

== Key ==
| B | Back | K | Kicker | NT | Nose tackle |
| C | Center | LB | Linebacker | FB | Fullback |
| DB | Defensive back | P | Punter | HB | Halfback |
| DE | Defensive end | QB | Quarterback | WR | Wide receiver |
| DT | Defensive tackle | RB | Running back | G | Guard |
| E | End | T | Offensive tackle | TE | Tight end |

== Selections ==
Selections as of the 2017 NFL Draft.

| Year | Round | Pick | Overall | Player | Team | Position |
|---|---|---|---|---|---|---|
| 1939 | 11 | 2 | 92 | Lou Tomasetti | Pittsburgh Steelers | B |
| 1939 | 19 | 3 | 173 | Bill Lane | Cleveland Rams | B |
| 1940 | 3 | 3 | 18 | George Kiick | Pittsburgh Steelers | B |
| 1940 | 7 | 2 | 52 | Hal Pegg | Philadelphia Eagles | C |
| 1940 | 17 | 4 | 154 | Frank Funair | Brooklyn Dodgers | B |
| 1944 | 18 | 1 | 176 | Walt Szot | Chicago Cardinals | T |
| 1945 | 9 | 1 | 77 | Etling Johnson | Brooklyn Dodgers | B |
| 1945 | 29 | 1 | 297 | Ralph Grant | Pittsburgh Steelers | B |
| 1946 | 21 | 6 | 196 | Ralph Grant | Green Bay Packers | B |
| 1946 | 22 | 4 | 204 | George Kochins | Chicago Bears | T |
| 1947 | 29 | 2 | 267 | Tom Rodgers | Boston Yanks | T |
| 1951 | 13 | 7 | 154 | Bill Szabo | Pittsburgh Steelers | T |
| 1952 | 26 | 1 | 302 | George Young | New York Yanks | T |
| 1952 | 36 | 4 | 305 | Bob Albert | Philadelphia Eagles | B |
| 1953 | 9 | 11 | 108 | Brad Myers | Los Angeles Rams | B |
| 1953 | 21 | 1 | 242 | Frank Kirby | Baltimore Colts | T |
| 1953 | 24 | 3 | 280 | Stan Butterworth | Washington Redskins | B |
| 1955 | 20 | 7 | 236 | Bob Anowiak | Green Bay Packers | B |
| 1955 | 26 | 3 | 304 | Marion Minker | Baltimore Colts | T |
| 1955 | 29 | 8 | 345 | Ron Lloyd | Philadelphia Eagles | T |
| 1961 | 8 | 7 | 105 | Paul Terhes | Baltimore Colts | B |
| 1969 | 8 | 25 | 207 | Sam Havrilak | Baltimore Colts | RB/WR |
| 2017 | 4 | 24 | 130 | Julién Davenport | Houston Texans | T |

== Notable Undrafted Players ==
| Year | Player | Team | Position |
|---|---|---|---|
| 2018 | Abdullah Anderson | Chicago Bears | DE |
