= Downing Stadium =

Former sports stadium in New York City

Coordinates: 40°47′38″N 73°55′27″W

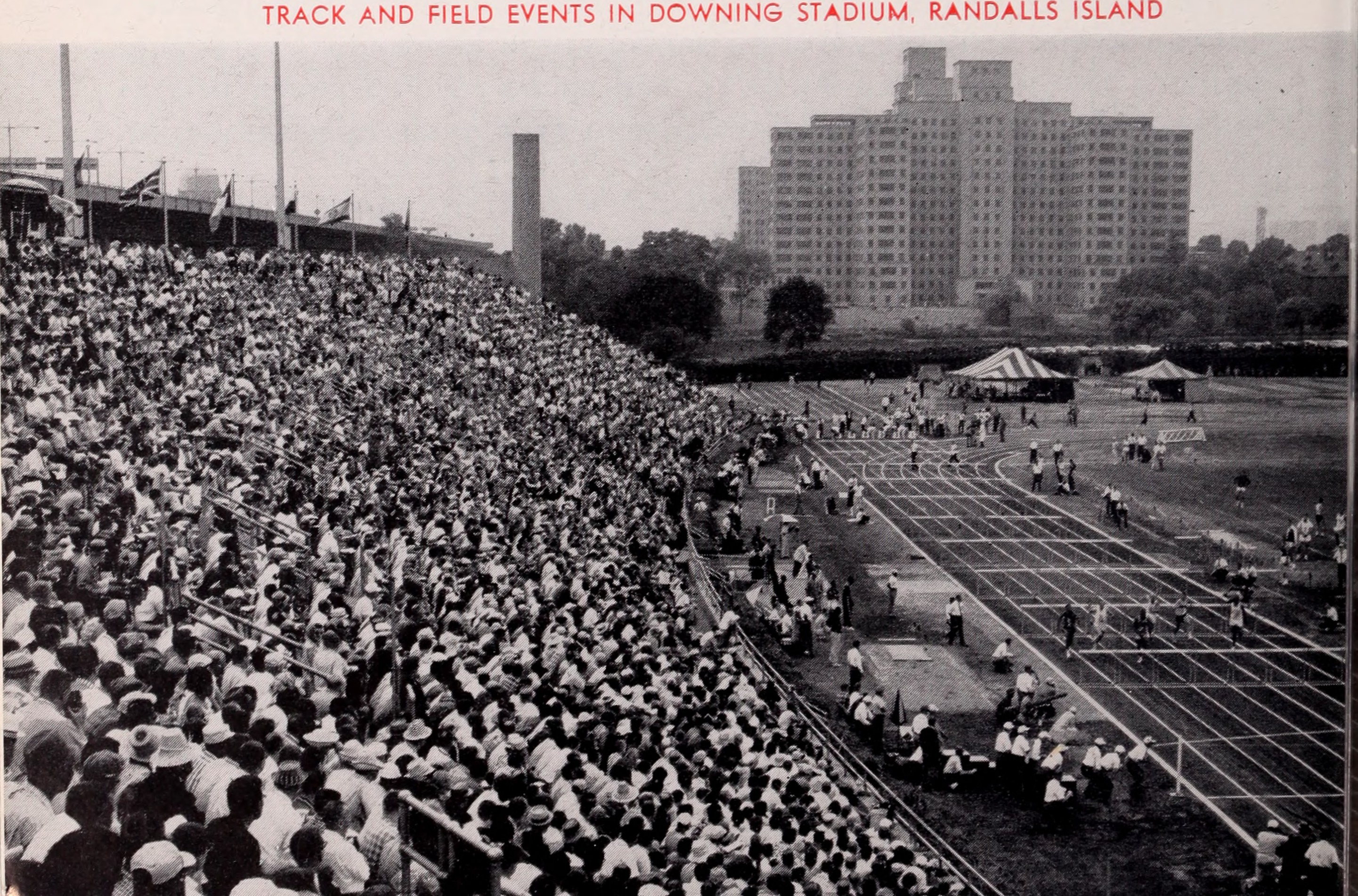
- Downing Stadium during the 1964 U.S. Olympic track and field trials
- Interactive map of Downing Stadium
- Former names: Randall's Island Stadium (1936–1948); Triborough Stadium (1948–1955)
- Location: New York City, New York
- Owner: New York City Department of Parks and Recreation
- Capacity: 22,000
- Surface: grass

Construction
- Groundbreaking: 1935
- Built: 1935–1936
- Opened: July 11, 1936
- Closed: 2002; 24 years ago
- Architect: Robert Moses

Tenants
- New York Yankees (AFL II) (some games, 1936–1937); Negro league games (1936–1940); Olympic trials (1936–1964); New York Yankees/Americans (AFL III) (some games 1940–1941); Brooklyn Dodgers (CFL) (1966); New York Stars (WFL) (1974); New York Cosmos (NASL) (1974–1975); New York Centaurs (A-League) (1995); New York United (ASL) (1981); Several concerts (1938–2002)

Downing Stadium, previously known as Triborough Stadium and Randall's Island Stadium, was a 22,000-seat stadium on Randalls Island in New York City. It was renamed Downing Stadium in 1955 after John J. Downing, a director at the New York City Department of Parks and Recreation. It was demolished in 2002 and the current Icahn Stadium was built on the site.

== Overview ==
=== Track and field ===
Built on Randalls Island in the East River as a WPA project, 15,000 attendees witnessed Jesse Owens compete at the stadium in the Men's Olympic Trials on July 11, 1936, the opening night of the new facility. Downing Stadium also hosted the Women's Olympic Trials in 1964. Later the stadium hosted the 1991 USA Outdoor Track and Field Championships.

The stadium was also used as a filming site for a Sesame Street segment about The Flashettes girls track team.

=== Football ===
Triborough Stadium served as one of two home stadiums of the second AFL team New York Yankees (along with Yankee Stadium) in 1936 and 1937. The first televised American football game was held at Triborough on September 30, 1939, as Fordham took on Waynesburg. It was for many years the home of the Stuyvesant High School Peglegs and the Cardinal Hayes High School football teams.

NYU's football team also played its last two seasons at Triborough in 1951 and 1952.

In 1966, the Continental Football League's Brooklyn Dodgers, unable to find a suitable field in Brooklyn (Ebbets Field had been torn down in 1960), played their home games at Downing. (Coincidentally, the football Dodgers wound up playing under the same lights used at Ebbets, as they had been moved to Randalls Island upon the older stadium's destruction.) The club would play only three games at Downing before the league took over the franchise and shifted their remaining home games elsewhere. Eight years later, Downing Stadium became the home of the New York Stars of the WFL; like the Dodgers, the Stars left the stadium before the season ended, shifting to Charlotte.

=== Soccer ===
Randalls Island was the site of three international soccer matches: the US team played Scotland on Randalls Island on June 19, 1949, with the Scots winning, 4–0, with 17,000 in attendance; on May 27, 1964, the English squad crushed the Americans, 10–0, in front of just 5,062 fans. Another friendly match took place in 1965 between the Argentine team CA Independiente, winners of the 1965 Copa Libertadores, and Spanish giants Real Madrid, five times champion of the European Cup at the time. The teams drew 1–1 in front of 12,000 people.

A friendly held at the stadium in July 1973 between Haiti and Millonarios of Colombia was delayed for more than two hours and forty five minutes by Haitian exiles protesting against the Duvalier regime. At one point, Haitian manager Antoine Tassy took his team to the dressing room and said that they were going home. He later made a call to Haitian Football Federation president Claude Raymond who told him to resume the match, if possible. Then, Serge Charles, a high-ranking member of the Haitian delegation to the United Nations, arrived and made another call to Raymond, and the Haitians agreed to go back on the field. Police arrived and cordoned off the field.

The New York Cosmos of the NASL moved to Downing in 1974. On June 15, 1975, Pelé made his NASL debut against the Dallas Tornado with 21,567 spectators in attendance and a national television audience on CBS. The stadium's condition was derided by team staff and television commentators; prior to Pelé's debut match, the field had broken glass and other litter that was cleared before green paint was added to improve its appearance for television audiences. The locker room roof had holes that were patched hours before. In 1976, the Cosmos moved out, back to Yankee Stadium (where they had spent their debut season in 1971); for years afterward, the words "COSMOS SOCCER" remained on the stadium to be seen from the nearby highway viaduct on the Triborough Bridge. Downing's last pro soccer tenant were the New York Centaurs of the A-League in 1995.

The site was considered for a 48,000-seat capacity soccer specific stadium, based on the design of the City of Manchester Stadium, had the New York City bid for the 2012 Summer Olympics been successful. The plan was shelved when New York lost out to London.

=== Baseball ===
The stadium was also used for some Negro league baseball games in the 1930s; it was the home of the New York Black Yankees in 1938.

=== Rugby ===
The stadium also played host to the rugby football New Zealand All Blacks several times, in the course of larger tours to Europe. They last played a New York Metropolitan selection in October 1972, beating their hosts 41–9.

Date	Teams	Match Type	Attendance	Notes
October 21, 1972	New Zealand 41–9 (United States) New York Metropolitan	1972–73 New Zealand Tour		
September 9, 1989	Ireland XV 32–7 United States	1989 Ireland Tour		

=== Other sports ===
In October 1997, Downing played host to a Gaelic football match between Cavan and Kerry; the game was moved to New York in order to commemorate the 1947 All Ireland Final between the same teams played at the Polo Grounds.

In May 1989, Downing hosted a number of international cricket players from Pakistan and India. They played a 40-over exhibition match, the first in a three-game US series which Pakistan won 2-1.

The "North America Cup", as it was known, continued the following May. In 1990, Pakistan played Australia, with many regular international cricketers participating from both countries. Australia won the match by 5 runs.

=== Music ===
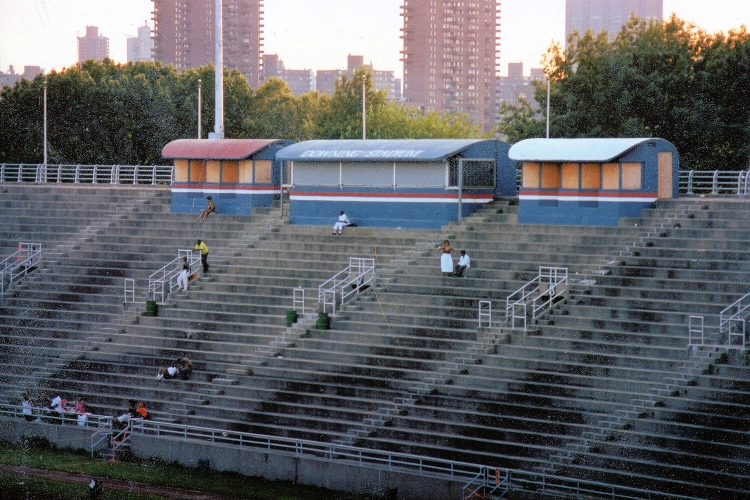
Downing Stadium during a music concert, c. 1990

In 1938, the stadium hosted the Carnival of Swing, one of the first large outdoor jazz festivals.

In August 1968, the New York Jazz Festival took place at Downing Stadium. Performers included Ray Charles, Miles Davis, Dizzy Gillespie, Miriam Makeba, and Mongo Santamaria.

On August 31, 1968, T.P. Productions presented N.Y. City Fun Festival at Downing, which included performances by Sam & Dave, Stevie Wonder, Wilson Pickett, B.B. King, Arthur Conley, Big Maybelle, and the Mirettes.

After the triumph of Woodstock the previous year, the three-day New York Pop Festival tried to re-create its success in New York City, opening on Randalls Island on July 17, 1970. Unfortunately, the concert was a bust, as half the big name lineup failed to show up (although Jimi Hendrix performed a memorable set). What is more, the festival was picketed by several radical groups: some of the protesters demanded that a portion of the ticket sales go to worthy causes (even threatening the box office), while others wanted everyone to get in free. (This was partially accomplished when thousands of concert-goers literally crashed through the gates.)

Once the stadium stopped being a major sports venue, Downing was used largely for concerts, serving as a venue for rock concerts such as Lollapalooza in 1994, Pearl Jam in 1996, and the Tibetan Freedom Concert in 1997.

== Fate ==
The stadium was torn down in 2002 in order to be replaced by a newer, smaller complex, Icahn Stadium, which was completed in 2004. This facility is used primarily for track and field.
