= Bill Hutchinson (American football) =

American football player (1916–2008)

Profile
- Position: Quarterback

Personal information
- Born: March 9, 1916; The Bronx, New York, U.S.
- Died: January 27, 2008 (aged 91)

Career information
- College: Dartmouth

Career history
- New York Yankees (1940); New York Americans (1941); New York Giants (1942)

Awards and highlights
- 1940 AFL All-League Team; First-team All-Eastern (1939)

Career statistics
- TD–INT: 0–2
- Passing yards: –3
- Passer rating: 0

William David Hutchinson (March 9, 1916 – January 27, 2008) was an American professional football player who was a quarterback in the National Football League (NFL). Hutchinson played in two games for the New York Giants in 1942, completing one pass in four attempts. In those two games, he recorded 27 rushing yards in seven attempts. In 1940, Hutchinson played for the New York Yankees of the third American Football League. He was a member of the AFL's All-League Team in 1940. In 1941 the Yankees, still with Hutchinson, changed their name to the Americans.

Hutchinson played college football for the Dartmouth Big Green from 1936–1939 as a fullback.
