= Steve Banas =

American football player (1907–1974)

Profile
- Position: Fullback

Personal information
- Born: April 30, 1907; Bridgeport, Connecticut, U.S.
- Died: May 10, 1974 (aged 67); Gardena, California, U.S.
- Listed height: 6 ft 0 in (1.83 m)
- Listed weight: 190 lb (86 kg)

Career information
- High school: Central (Bridgeport)
- College: Notre Dame

Career history
- Detroit Lions (1935); Philadelphia Eagles (1935); Buffalo Indians (1940-1941) (AFL)

Awards and highlights
- NFL champion (1935)
- Stats at Pro Football Reference

Stephen Peter Banas (April 30, 1907 – May 10, 1974) was an American football player. He played college football for Notre Dame from 1931 to 1933, and professional football for the Detroit Lions and Philadelphia Eagles in 1935. In July 1935, Banas became the football coach at St. Mary's College of Orchard Lake, Michigan, but he instead played professional football that fall. In 1940 He played for the Buffalo Indians in the AFL, where he played 8 games and started two. He played another five games for them in 1941. Banas died in 1974 at age 67 in Gardena, California.
