= Maurice McGrath =

American football player (1916–1968)

Maurice Neil "Moose" McGrath (October 1, 1916 – July 7, 1968) was an American football player. He played professionally as a tackle for the Buffalo Indians of the American Football League (1940). McGrath played college football as a center at Niagara University.

Following his football career, McGrath became a lawyer and served as a Democratic Party chairman for Oswego County. A native of Oswego, New York, he earned a law degree from Syracuse University College of Law and served as an infantry major in the United States Army during World War II. He died on July 7, 1968, in Oswego, from injuries suffered in a car accident when his car struck a bridge abutment.
