= Joe Ratica =

American football player (1914–1942)

Profile
- Position: Center / Linebacker

Personal information
- Born: August 4, 1914; Denbo, Pennsylvania
- Died: 1942 (aged 27–28)
- Listed height: 6 ft 0 in (1.83 m)
- Listed weight: 205 lb (93 kg)

Career information
- College: St. Vincent
- NFL draft: 1939: undrafted

Career history
- Brooklyn Dodgers (1939); Boston Bears (1940); Buffalo Indians (1941)

Awards and highlights
- Second-team All-AFL honors (1940)

Career NFL statistics
- Games played: 7
- Games started: 4
- Stats at Pro Football Reference

Joseph H. Ratica (August 4, 1914 – 1942) was an American professional football center and linebacker for the Brooklyn Dodgers of the National Football League during their 1939 season. He was born in Pennsylvania, and attended St. Vincent College. On October 22, 1939, he played in the first NFL game to be broadcast live on television, against the Philadelphia Eagles.
