= New York Yankees (1936 AFL) =

1936-1937 AFL season

General information
- Founded: 1936
- Folded: 1937
- Stadium: Yankee Stadium; Triborough Stadium
- Headquartered: New York, New York, United States
- Colors: Red, White, Blue

Personnel
- Owner: James Bush (president)
- Head coach: Jack McBride (1936–1937)

Team history
- New York Yankees (1936–37)

League / conference affiliations
- American Football League (1936–1937)

The New York Yankees of the second American Football League was the second professional American football team competing under that name. It is unrelated to the Yankees of the first AFL (and the National Football League), the Yankees of the third AFL, the Yankees of the American Association (then also called the American Football League) and the (later) Yankees of the All-America Football Conference. The Yankees played their home games in Yankee Stadium and Triborough Stadium in New York, New York. Jack McBride was the team’s head coach throughout its existence; Yankees' president James Bush served as president of the second American Football League in 1936.

Formed by signing National Football League players, primarily New York Giants, the 1936 Yankees (including back Elmer Strong and tackle Jess Quatse) battled the Boston Shamrocks and the Cleveland Rams for the league title (which Boston won). New York Giants-turned-Yankees also included end Les Borden and back Stu Clancy. The 1937 edition of the Yankees was never truly in the running as league newcomers Los Angeles Bulldogs were the only AFL team with a winning record as Los Angeles dominated the league with an unbeaten, untied 8–0–0 record (the Yankees finished in third place for the second straight year, this time with 2–3–1).

While there was no "official" all-AFL team declared for the 1936 season, guard Alex Drobnitch was the sole Yankee to be named to the All-League team in 1937. Other Yankees stars include Dean Nesmith, Charlie Segal, Al Rose, and Irv "King Kong" Klein.

The complete domination of the AFL by the Bulldogs decimated attendance in Yankee Stadium as LA played the second half of its season on the American West Coast (while the Yankees averaged roughly 14,000 in attendance in 1936, the number was cut to about 5000 in 1937). With all the AFL clubs (except Los Angeles) deeply in the red, the second American Football League – and the Yankees – closed up shop at the end of the 1937 season.

Year	W	L	T	Finish	Head coach
1936	5	3	2	3rd (AFL)	Jack McBride
1937	2	3	1	3rd (AFL)	Jack McBride

== Link to AFL III Yankees? ==
Some sources indicate the Yankees of the third American Football League (1940) a continuation of the 1936–1937 Yankees, citing a common head coach (Jack McBride) and the continuing existences of two other AFL II teams, the Cincinnati Bengals (which also competed in the third AFL) and the Los Angeles Bulldogs (which became a founding member of the Pacific Coast Professional Football League in 1940 – after competing with Cincinnati in the American Professional Football League, which ironically called itself the American Football League in 1938). While circumstantial evidence hints at the Yankees having a similar continuation, there is no record of any Yankees games played in 1938 and 1939, and the 1940 Yankees team had different ownership/management from its 1937 namesakes, aside from their common head coach. They had a center, Henry Bogacki who played on the team.
