= New York Yankees (1940 AFL) =

1940-1941

General information
- Founded: 1940
- Folded: 1941
- Stadium: Yankee Stadium; Downing Stadium
- Headquartered: New York, New York, United States
- Colors: Red, White, Blue

Personnel
- Owners: Douglas Hertz (1941); William Cox (1941)
- Head coach: Jack McBride (1940); Benny Friedman (1941); Jack Wallace (1941)

Team history
- New York Yankees (1940–41); New York Americans (1941)

League / conference affiliations
- American Football League (1940–41); American Association (1941)

The New York Yankees of the third American Football League was the third professional American football team competing under that name. It is unrelated to the Yankees of the first AFL (and the National Football League), the Yankees of the second AFL, and the (later) Yankees of the All-America Football Conference. The Yankees played their home games in Yankee Stadium and Downing Stadium in New York, New York.

After finishing fourth in the AFL’s season of 1940, the Yankees were sold to agent and promoter Douglas Hertz. By the summer of 1941, the team’s AFL franchise was revoked in light of a scandal involving the new owner, and a group headed by William Cox assumed control of the team by the beginning of the new season. The newly renamed New York Americans were competitive, finishing one-half game behind league champions Columbus Bullies. While the Americans were making plans for a 1942 AFL season, the league suspended operations in the wake of the entry of the United States into World War II, and the Americans followed suit. The league did not return to business after the end of the war, and neither did the New York Americans.

== 1940 New York Yankees ==
The Yankees were one of three charter members of the third AFL (along with the Boston Bears and Buffalo Indians) that were formed with the expressed purpose of competing in a major professional football league to compete with the established National Football League. The new league became official after the Cincinnati Bengals, Columbus Bullies and a newly minted Milwaukee Chiefs defected from the American Professional Football Association. The roster for the 1940 season had five players who competed in the NFL in 1939. Head coach Jack McBride was also the coach of the New York Yankees of the second American Football League (1936–1937).

Year	W	L	T	Finish
1940	4	5	0	4th (AFL)

== 1941 New York Americans ==
In January 1941, the Yankees were sold to agent and promoter Douglas Hertz. After questions arose about the finances of the new owner arose, the AFL revoked the franchise and transferred ownership to a syndicate headed by William Cox (later the owner of the Philadelphia Phillies baseball team) in August. Shortly afterward, the team’s name was changed to the New York Americans.

Year	W	L	T	Finish
1941	5	2	1	2nd (AFL)

Unlike the 1940 Yankees, the Americans had a flair for publicity, having signed college star running back John Kimbrough for $37,500 on a personal services contract that required personal appearances on behalf of the team. Well into the season, the Americans announced the signing of Heisman Trophy winner Tom Harmon (who had begun a career in broadcasting University of Michigan football games) for the game between the Americans and league leader Columbus. Harmon threw two interceptions while Hutchinson was similarly ineffective. In the second half, the New York fans shouted “We want [Bill] Hutchinson,” the Americans’ regular rusher. The game ended in a 0–0 tie.

A loss to the Milwaukee Chiefs the following week (the last game of the season) cost the Americans the AFL championship.

== 1941 New York Yankees ==
The 1941 New York Yankees, the fourth New York professional football team with the name, was a team formed and owned by Douglas Hertz after the third American Football League revoked his ownership of a franchise that was later renamed the New York Americans in August 1941. Initially an independent team, the Yankees joined the American Association in October to replace the Providence Steamroller, which dropped out of the league after only two games. Having four members of the 1940 Yankees, the 1941 edition lost all six of its American Association games (as a traveling team) and folded soon afterward.

Year	W	L	T	Finish
1941	0	6	0	6th (AA)

Note: won-lost record includes American Association league games only
