= Jack McBride =

American football player and coach (1901–1966)

- McBride in 1925

No. 16, 1, 12, 26, 20
- Positions: Running back, quarterback

Personal information
- Born: November 30, 1901; Conshohocken, Pennsylvania, U.S.
- Died: October 11, 1966 (aged 64); Tonopah, Nevada, U.S.
- Listed height: 5 ft 11 in (1.80 m)
- Listed weight: 185 lb (84 kg)

Career information
- College: Syracuse

Career history

Playing
- 1925–1928: New York Giants
- 1929: Providence Steam Roller
- 1930–1932: Brooklyn Dodgers
- 1932–1934: New York Giants
- 1935: Patterson Panthers

Coaching
- 1935: Patterson Panthers
- 1936–1937: New York Yankees
- 1940: New York Yankees

Awards and highlights
- 2× NFL champion (1927, 1934); All-Pro (1925)
- Stats at Pro Football Reference

John F. "Jack" McBride (November 30, 1901 – October 11, 1966) was an American football player who played the positions of halfback, fullback, and quarterback in the National Football League (NFL). He played college football for the Syracuse Orangemen.

McBride finished second in the nation in scoring in his senior year to Heinie Benkert. McBride scored 90 points on 7 touchdowns, 11 field goals, and 15 extra points in his senior year.

McBride played 10 seasons in the NFL, leading the Giants in scoring in each of their first three seasons (1925–27), and the NFL in scoring in 1927. McBride was named the Most Valuable Player of the NFL for the 1927 season, handily topping teammate Hinkey Haines and the injured Red Grange of the Chicago Bears in voting for the honor.

As a passer, McBride ended his career with 3,123 yards passing, 31 touchdown passes, and 57 interceptions. As a rusher McBride totalled 2,093 yards rushing, and 26 rushing touchdowns, while averaging 4.2 yards a carry.

McBride maintained his connection with pro football after his career in the NFL serving as the player/coach of the Paterson Panthers (later of the American Association) in 1935 and as coach of the New York Yankees of the second American Football League and the New York Yankees of the third AFL from 1940 to 1941.

== See also ==
- History of the New York Giants (1925–1978)
