= Bob Eckl =

American football player (1917–1961)

Profile
- Position: Tackle

Personal information
- Born: November 20, 1917; Milwaukee, Wisconsin, U.S.
- Died: September 30, 1961 (aged 43); Ripon, Wisconsin, U.S.

Career information
- College: Wisconsin

Career history
- 1940–1941: Milwaukee Chiefs (AFL)
- 1941: Cincinnati Bengals (AFL)
- 1945: Chicago Cardinals (NFL)

Robert Joseph Eckl (November 20, 1917 - September 30, 1961) was an American professional football player in the National Football League as a tackle for the Chicago Cardinals in 1945. Prior to that he played for the Milwaukee Chiefs of the third American Football League. In 1940 Eckl was elected to the All-AFL, with 1st team honors. A year later, he remained in the AFL, and split the season between the Chiefs and the Cincinnati Bengals.

Prior to his professional career, Eckl played at the collegiate level at the University of Wisconsin–Madison.
