= Hal Pegg =

American football player (1915–1991)

No. 22
- Position: Center

Personal information
- Born: September 10, 1915; Plymouth, Pennsylvania, U.S.
- Died: November 28, 1991 (aged 76); Dundalk, Maryland, U.S.
- Listed height: 6 ft 0 in (1.83 m)
- Listed weight: 196 lb (89 kg)

Career information
- College: Bucknell
- NFL draft: 1940: 7th round, 52nd overall pick

Career history
- Philadelphia Eagles (1940)*; Buffalo Indians (1940)
- * Offseason or practice squad member only

Harold Clark Pegg (September 10, 1915 – November 28, 1991), who preferred to be called "Hal" or "Mike", was an American football center who played for the Buffalo Indians of the American Football League (AFL) in 1940. He played college football at Bucknell and was drafted by the Philadelphia Eagles of the National Football League (NFL) in the seventh round of the 1940 NFL draft. He played in seven games in 1940 for the Indians, starting five.
