= Jim Karcher =

American football player (1914–1997)

No. 29
- Position: Guard

Personal information
- Born: May 2, 1914; Forest, Ohio, U.S.
- Died: August 19, 1997 (aged 83); St. Louis Park, Minnesota, U.S.
- Listed height: 6 ft 0 in (1.83 m)
- Listed weight: 205 lb (93 kg)

Career information
- High school: Forest
- College: Ohio State

Career history
- Boston/Washington Redskins (1936–1939); Columbus Bullies (1940)

Awards and highlights
- NFL champion (1937); Second-team All-Big Ten (1935)

Career statistics
- Games played: 42
- Starts: 33
- Stats at Pro Football Reference

James Norman Karcher (May 2, 1914 – August 19, 1997) was an American football offensive lineman for the Boston/Washington Redskins in the National Football League (NFL) and the Columbus Bullies in the American Football League (AFL), making the AFL All-League team for 1940. He played college football at Ohio State University.

== Biography ==
Karcher was born in Forest, Ohio, the son of Jerome John Karcher and Daisy E. Tuttle Karcher. His father died by drowning during a 1924 flood. He played college football at Ohio State University.

Karcher played professional football with the Washington Redskins from 1936 to 1939 (starting while they were still based in Boston). He was a right guard in the starting lineup for the 1937 NFL championship game. He played one more year on the Columbus Bullies, an AFL team.

Karcher married Helen Roberta Zimmerman. They had three daughters. His wife died in 1989, and he died in 1997, at the age of 83, in St. Louis Park, Minnesota.
