= Earl Seick =

American football player (1911–1989)

Profile
- Position: Guard

Personal information
- Born: April 28, 1911; Lewiston, New York
- Died: October 31, 1989 (aged 78); Riverside County, California
- Listed height: 6 ft 0 in (1.83 m)
- Listed weight: 195 lb (88 kg)

Career information
- College: Manhattan

Career history
- Boston Shamrocks (1936); New York Giants (1942)

Career statistics
- Games: 6
- Games Started: 0
- Interceptions: 0
- Stats at Pro Football Reference

Frederick Earl "Red" Seick (April 29, 1911 – October 31, 1989) was a professional American football Guard who played in 1942 with the New York Giants. He also played for the old American Football League's Boston Shamrocks in 1936.
