= Hal Pennington =

American athletics coach

- Education: Xavier University
- Occupation: Athletics coach
- Years active: 1934–1988

Hal Pennington is a former American athletics coach. He was the founder and first head coach of the AFL II Cincinnati Bengals. He also had a 33-year career in amateur baseball, winning four National Amateur Baseball Federation World Series titles.

== Early life and education ==
Pennington attended St. Xavier High School where he was a three-sport athlete, graduating in 1930. He was an all-city first baseman in baseball and played halfback and fullback in football. In basketball, he led the team in scoring his junior and senior years. Pennington attended Xavier University where he served as co-captain of the basketball team his senior year. He went on to play professional basketball prior to the NBA.

== Career ==
Pennington was the head coach of the Midwest Football League Cincinnati Model Shoes. He left after one season to form the Cincinnati Bengals of the second American Football League.

Pennington became a legendary amateur baseball coach in Cincinnati, winning four NABF World Series titles. He retired from baseball with 1,392 wins and .862 winning percentage. He coached 60 players that went on to play professional baseball, 11 who went on to the major leagues including Dave Parker, Buddy Bell, Ron Oester, and Len Matuszek.

Pennington retired from coaching in 1988. Throughout his sports career, he recorded 1,577 wins and 246 losses among all sports.

== Recognition ==
In 1987, Pennington was inducted into the St. Xavier High School hall of fame. He is also a member of the Hamilton County Sports Hall of Fame, Buddy La-Rosa High School Hall of Fame, and Xavier University Basketball Hall of Fame.
