= Dean Nesmith =

American football player and athletic trainer

Dean Nesmith was a professional football player and athletic trainer in the United States. He played professionally for the New York "Football" Yankees and was a three-year letterman for the Kansas Jayhawks, where he would return as athletic trainer of the school. He also was the trainer for the 1960 United States Olympic Basketball Team.

Nesmith was a native of Belleville, Kansas and in 1997 was inducted into the Kansas Athletic Trainers Hall of Fame.
