= Joe Kruse =

American basketball and football player (1914–2003)

Personal information
- Born: September 9, 1914 Louisville, Kentucky, U.S.
- Died: January 18, 2003 (aged 88) Cincinnati, Ohio, U.S.
- Listed height: 6 ft 2 in (1.88 m)
- Listed weight: 200 lb (91 kg)

Career information
- High school: St. Xavier (Louisville, Kentucky)
- College: Xavier (1934–1937)
- Position: Guard

Career history
- 1937–1938: Cincinnati Comellos

Joseph Raymond Kruse (September 9, 1914 – January 18, 2003) was an American professional basketball and football player. He played for the Cincinnati Comellos in the National Basketball League during the 1937–38 season and averaged 3.3 points per game.

Kruse also played in the American Football League for the Cincinnati Bengals from 1937 through 1941. He was named to the All-AFL Team in the 1941 season.
