= Ernie Wheeler =

American football player (1915–1982)

No. 15, 41, 31
- Positions: Defensive back, Tailback

Personal information
- Born: January 28, 1915; Fargo, North Dakota, U.S.
- Died: June 18, 1982 (aged 67); Fargo, North Dakota, U.S.
- Listed height: 6 ft 1 in (1.85 m)
- Listed weight: 190 lb (86 kg)

Career information
- High school: Central (Fargo)
- College: North Dakota State (1935-1938)
- NFL draft: 1939: 5th round, 32nd overall pick

Career history
- Pittsburgh Pirates (1939); Chicago Cardinals (1939); Boston Bears (1939); Chicago Cardinals (1942)

Career NFL statistics
- Passing yards: 94
- TD–INT: 1-7
- Passer rating: 30.1
- Stats at Pro Football Reference

Ernest Martin Wheeler (January 28, 1915 – June 18, 1982) was an American football defensive back and tailback who played in the National Football League (NFL) in 1939 and 1942.

Wheeler played college football at North Dakota State University from 1936 to 1938, and was named to the All-North Central Conference team each year as a running back. In college, he also played basketball and participated in track events. In the 1939 NFL draft, the Pittsburgh Pirates chose Wheeler with the 32nd overall pick, during round five. Wheeler played in five games for the Pirates, posting 8 rushing yards in 15 attempts. He also delivered a punt of 75 yards, the second-longest in the NFL that year. Later in 1939, Wheeler played in two games for the Chicago Cardinals, rushing the ball twice for a net loss of eight yards. He did not play again in the NFL until 1942, when he played in three games for the Cardinals. Wheeler was part of the inaugural class inducted into North Dakota State's Bison Athletic Hall of Fame in 1972.
