= Henry Bogacki =

American football player (1912–2007)

Henry Bogacki (November 8, 1912 – April 3, 2007) was a center for New York Yankees and Rochester Tigers.
