= Harlan Gustafson =

American football and baseball player (1917–1984)

Profile
- Position: End

Personal information
- Born: December 29, 1917; Joliet, Illinois, U.S.
- Died: April 18, 1984 (aged 66); Los Angeles, California, U.S.

Career information
- College: Penn

Career history
- New York Yankees (1940)

Awards and highlights
- First-team All-AFL (1940); First-team All-American (1939); First-team All-Eastern (1939)

Harlan Iver Gustafson (December 29, 1917 – April 18, 1984) was an American football player.

Gustafson was born in Joliet, Illinois, and attended the University of Pennsylvania. He played college football for the Penn Quakers football team and was selected by the International News Service as a first-team end on the 1939 College Football All-America Team. He also played baseball for Penn in 1940, compiling a .402 batting average.

Gustafson played professional football in the American Football League for the New York Yankees during the 1940 season and was selected by the league's coaches as a first-team end on the 1940 All-League team.

Gustafson joined the Naval Reserve in Philadelphia in March 1941. He began active duty in the United States Navy in December 1941 and served as a Navy pilot through October 1945. He was rescued after making a forced landing in the Pacific Ocean in early 1944.

Gustafson died in 1984 in Los Angeles, California, at age 66.
