= Milwaukee Chiefs (AFL) =

General information
- Founded: 1940
- Folded: 1941
- Stadium: Dairy Bowl (State Fair Park)
- Headquartered: Milwaukee, Wisconsin
- Colors: Blue & Silver

Personnel
- General manager: George M. Harris
- Head coach: Tiny Cahoon

League / conference affiliations
- American Football League

The Milwaukee Chiefs were a professional American football team based in Wisconsin that competed in the third American Football League in 1940 and in 1941.

The team played its home games in the Dairy Bowl at State Fair Park in West Allis, a suburb just west of Milwaukee. Originally formed as an expansion team for the minor league formerly known as the American Professional Football Association for the 1940 season, the new team joined fellow AFL members Cincinnati Bengals and Columbus Bullies in becoming charter members of a new major-league AFL (the triple defection triggered the demise of the minor league, allowing the new major league to adopt the AFL name). The team president was George M. Harris, and the head coach was Tiny Cahoon.

The team's first training camp in 1940 was held at Weyauwega in Waupaca County. The second camp in 1941 was closer to home, with lights, at West Bend in Washington County.

In the two seasons of the league's existence, the Chiefs fielded a competitive team. In 1940, the team scored the most points and gave up the fewest over the course of the season, but lost to Columbus in the final game to give the league championship to the Bullies. The following year, the Chiefs and the Bullies were joined by the New York Americans in a three-way race for the championship, with the Chiefs' continuing inability to defeat the Bullies (losing in Columbus and tying in Milwaukee) led to Columbus repeating as AFL champions and Milwaukee finishing third.

For the two years of the league's existence, the Chiefs were a popular draw as they played in Wisconsin's largest stadium. The AFL had accepted the 1941 entrance of a new Detroit team and deferred it until 1942, but the Pearl Harbor attack and the subsequent U.S. entry into World War II put all plans for football to a halt. In September 1942, league president William D. Cox announced the suspension of league activities until after the war, but the league – and the Chiefs – never returned.

Year	W	L	T	Finish
1940	7	2	0	2nd (AFL)
1941	4	3	1	3rd (AFL)
