= William D. Cox =

American sports executive

William Cox
- Born: William Drought Cox; November 8, 1909; New York, New York, U.S.
- Died: March 28, 1989 (aged 79); Mount Kisco, New York, U.S.
- Occupation: Sports Executive

William Drought Cox (November 8, 1909 – March 28, 1989) was an American businessman and sports executive.

== Early life ==
Cox was born in 1909, growing up on Riverside Drive on Manhattan's Upper West Side. He graduated from high school at the age of 15, then attended New York University and Yale University. After working in commercial and investment banking, he joined a lumber firm, becoming that company's president at the age of 27. He later founded his own lumber brokerage.

== New York Yankees (AFL III) ==
Cox first entered the sports world when he headed a group that bought the New York Yankees of the third American Football League in 1941. He also served as the league's president. After changing the team's name to the New York Americans, Cox's first major splash was signing Heisman Trophy winner Tom Harmon and complete a backfield tandem with John Kimbrough. Soon afterward, Cox was named league president as well. He had ambitious plans for the Yankees, but the outbreak of World War II resulted in several players from the Yankees and other teams either enlisting or being drafted into the military. With several teams' rosters depleted to the point that they could not field viable teams, Cox announced the league would shut down for the war's duration. As it turned out, it never returned. He also supplied the pilings used to reinforce the Panama Canal during the war.

== Philadelphia Phillies ==
In 1943, Cox bought the Philadelphia Phillies of Major League Baseball's National League (NL). Financially strapped owner Gerald Nugent had barely survived the 1942 season, needing an advance from the league just to go to spring training. Realizing there was no way he could operate the team in 1943, he initially planned to sell it to Bill Veeck, only to have those plans derailed by Baseball Commissioner Kenesaw Mountain Landis when word got out that Veeck planned to stock the team with Negro league stars. Landis pressured National League president Ford Frick to take over the franchise. The league sold it to Cox a week later. Although long thought to be false based on press accounts of the time, evidence has surfaced that Nugent indeed planned to sell the Phillies to Veeck, only to have Landis step in and engineer the sale to Cox. Cox headed a 30-man syndicate that outbid another group headed by construction magnate John B. Kelly Sr., buying the Phillies for $190,000 and a $50,000 note on March 15, 1943. At the age of only 33 at the time, he was the youngest owner in the league.

At the time Cox took over, the Phillies had been the dregs of the NL for a quarter century; they had finished above .500 only once since 1918, at least in part because the team's owners had been unwilling or unable to spend the money necessary to build a winner. Cox, however, was not afraid to spend what it took to get the Phillies out of the cellar. He significantly increased the team's payroll and devoted significant resources to player development (including the farm system) for the first time in the history of the franchise. He also hired Bucky Harris, who had won two pennants and one World Series with the Washington Senators, as manager.

However, Cox was a very hands-on owner; as Rich Westcott of the Society for American Baseball Research put it, he tried to run the Phillies "with the same strict regimen with which he ran his lumber company." He'd played baseball at Yale, and still thought of himself as a star athlete. Believing the team needed to be better conditioned, he hired his high school track coach, Harold Bruce, as team trainer. Cox even suited up for workouts, and frequently showed up at the clubhouse before and after games. All of this grated on Harris, and when he protested against Cox's interference, Cox fired him on July 27 at a press conference, without bothering to inform Harris. The players threatened to go on strike in protest, but Harris urged them to drop those plans after Cox threatened legal action.

Despite this, the Phillies showed signs of respectability for the first time in years, and they finished 64–90, a healthy 22-game improvement from 1942, to get out of the cellar for the first time in five years. Although they were still a long way from contention, the long-beleaguered Phillies fans appreciated what Cox was trying to do. The Phillies attracted over 466,000 fans, more than double their 1942 gate and their best attendance since 1916. At the time of Harris' firing, the Phillies had already won 38 games, just four fewer than they had won in the previous season. More importantly in the long run, the farm system had begun developing the players who would help lead the Phillies to the 1950 World Series.

On July 28, Harris dropped a bombshell at his hotel room in Philadelphia: he had evidence that Cox was betting on his own team. When Landis got wind of Harris' charges, he launched an immediate investigation. Initially, Cox denied any wrongdoing, but conceded that some of his business associates bet on the Phillies. As the investigation progressed, Cox changed his story and admitted making some "sentimental" bets on the Phillies, and he claimed that he didn't know it was against the rules. This made no difference to Landis, who suspended Cox indefinitely on November 23, 1943.

Cox immediately resigned as team president but appealed Landis' ruling 11 days later. At the December 4 hearing, Harris testified that he'd heard Cox's secretary asking about the odds for a game between the Phillies and Brooklyn Dodgers; when Harris asked, "Do you mean to tell me Mr. Cox is betting on baseball?" the secretary replied that it was common knowledge in the Phillies office. On the basis of this and other evidence, Landis ordered that Cox be banned for life, thus making Cox the first non-player to be banned from baseball by Landis; he is the last owner to be banned for life as of 2025.

Bob Carpenter Sr., scion of the Delaware-based Du Pont family, bought the team with his son for an estimated $400,000 on Nov. 23, 1943, the same day that Cox was banned. The Carpenter family owned the Phillies until 1981.

Cox was reinstated by Commissioner Rob Manfred on May 13, 2025 along with other deceased players who were on the ineligible list.

== Professional soccer leagues ==
In 1960, Cox led entrepreneurs in creating the International Soccer League, an annual summer competition that would bring professional soccer teams from various nations, as well as a team of American-born players, the New York Americans to play against each other in New York City. The International Soccer League competition lasted for six summers, and would stage matches in other cities during its existence. In 1967, Cox and other sportsmen launched the National Professional Soccer League in 10 American cities. After a merger with the rival United Soccer Association, eight of the NPSL franchises (the Atlanta Chiefs, Baltimore Bays, Chicago/Kansas City Spurs, Los Angeles/San Diego Toros, New York Generals, Oakland Clippers, St. Louis Stars, and Toronto Falcons) would become part of the North American Soccer League.

Cox retired to other business interests and died in Mount Kisco, New York in 1989.
