= Nelson Peterson =

American football player (1913–1990)

No. 28, 11
- Position: Running back

Personal information
- Born: September 22, 1913; Weston, West Virginia, U.S.
- Died: December 4, 1990 (aged 77); Broward County, Florida, U.S.
- Listed height: 5 ft 8 in (1.73 m)
- Listed weight: 179 lb (81 kg)

Career information
- High school: Weston
- College: West Virginia Wesleyan

Career history

Playing
- Cleveland Rams (1936); Washington Redskins (1937); Cleveland Rams (1938); St. Louis Gunners (1939); Columbus Bullies (1940–1941)

Coaching
- Fort McClellan (1945) Head coach

Awards and highlights
- NFL champion (1937)
- Stats at Pro Football Reference

Nelson Lane Peterson (September 22, 1913 – December 4, 1990) was an American football running back who played the National Football League (NFL) for the Washington Redskins and the Cleveland Rams. He attended West Virginia Wesleyan College. Peterson was the head coach and played for the 1945 Fort McClellan Riflemen football team.

== Head coaching record ==
Year	Team	Overall	Conference	Standing	Bowl/playoffs
Fort McClellan Riflemen (Independent) (1945)
1945	Fort McClellan	4–2			
Fort McClellan:		4–2			
Total:		4–2			
