= John Kimbrough =

American politician, actor, football player (1918–2006)

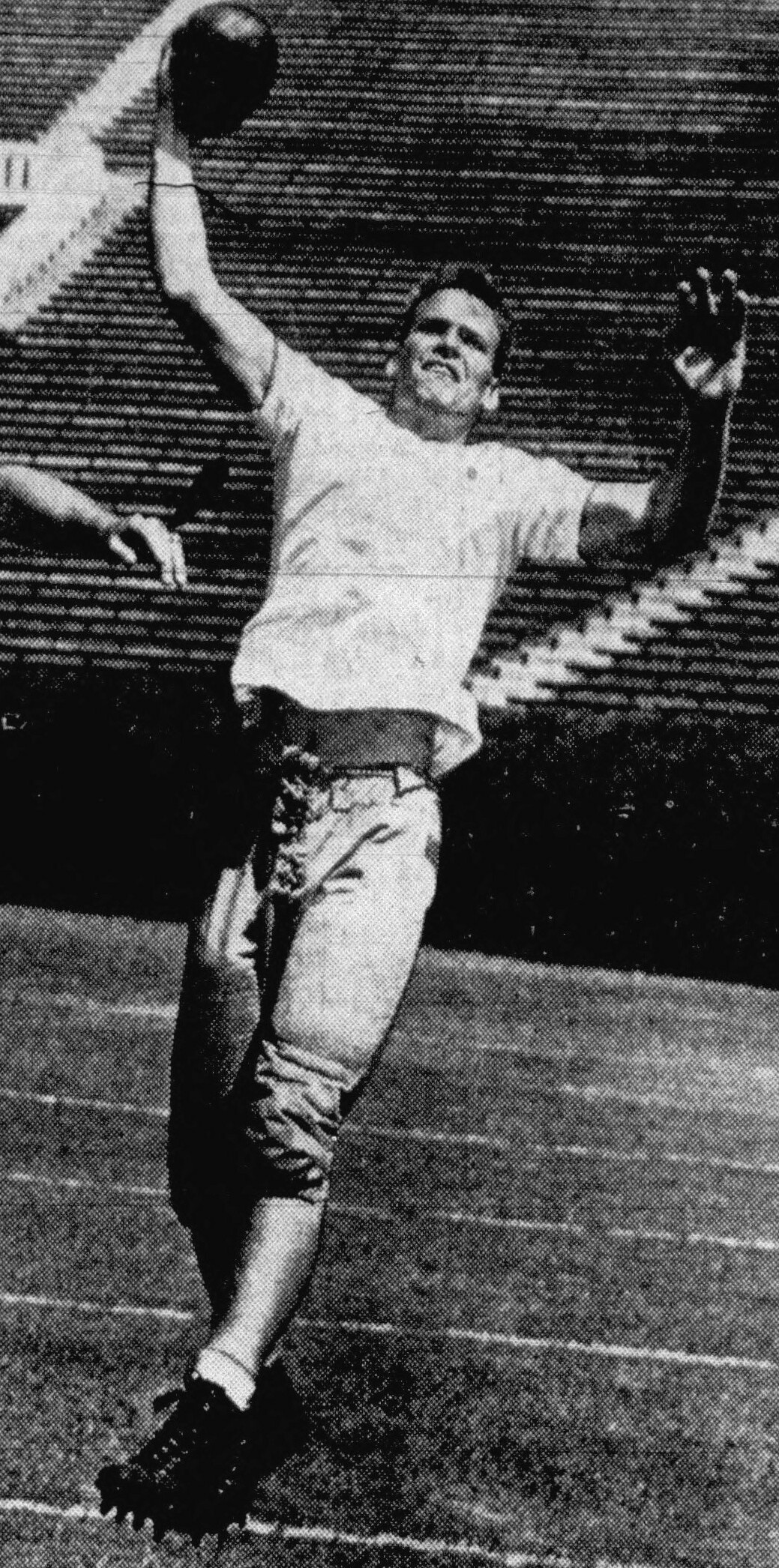
- Kimbrough c. 1942

No. 39, 77
- Position: Fullback

Personal information
- Born: June 14, 1918; Haskell, Texas, U.S.
- Died: May 8, 2006 (aged 87); Haskell, Texas, U.S.
- Listed height: 6 ft 2 in (1.88 m)
- Listed weight: 210 lb (95 kg)

Career information
- High school: Haskell (Texas); Abilene (Abilene, Texas)
- College: Texas A&M (1938–1940)
- NFL draft: 1941: 1st round, 2nd overall pick

Career history
- New York Americans (1941); Los Angeles Dons (1946–1948)

Awards and highlights
- AAFC rushing touchdowns co-leader (1946); National champion (1939); Unanimous All-American (1940); Consensus All-American (1939); 3× First-team All-SWC (1938, 1939, 1940)

Career AAFC statistics
- Rushing yards: 1,224
- Rushing average: 3.7
- Rushing touchdowns: 17
- Receptions: 35
- Receiving yards: 574
- Receiving touchdowns: 6
- Stats at Pro Football Reference
- College Football Hall of Fame

John Alec Kimbrough (June 14, 1918 – May 8, 2006) was a college athlete, a member of the Texas Legislature, a starring actor of two western movies, and a rancher. His older brother, Frank Kimbrough, served as head football coach for the Baylor Bears and the West Texas State Buffaloes.

== Career ==
=== Football ===
Kimbrough, an alumnus of Texas A&M University, was known as the "Haskell Hurricane" when he played Texas A&M Aggies football team. He played fullback on the Aggie's undefeated 1939 national championship team. In 1940 he finished second to the University of Michigan's Tom Harmon in Heisman Trophy balloting. According to his College Football Hall of Fame biography, Jarrin' John was a punishing 6 ft 2 in tall 210 lb running back known for breaking tackles with his high knee action who was honored with induction into that organization in 1954.

Kimbrough was drafted in the first round with the second overall pick in the 1941 NFL Draft by the Chicago Cardinals. He made his professional football debut on October 19, 1941, playing for the New York Americans against the Columbus Bullies, the same game that also marked the professional debut of Tom Harmon. In 1941, he started alongside Harmon in the Americans backfield in the third American Football League and became the team's primary running threat after Harmon left the team for military service.

=== Acting ===
After the AFL folded in response to the Japanese attack on Pearl Harbor, Kimbrough parlayed his gridiron fame and athletic good looks into a Hollywood contract, though he only appeared in two western motion pictures, Sundown Jim and The Lone Star Ranger, both released in 1942.

=== Military ===
After leaving Hollywood, Kimbrough served as an Army pilot in the Pacific Theater of Operations during World War II.

=== Return to football ===
Kimbrough leads the charge on the cover of this 1947 LA Dons program.

Returning from military service, Kimbrough played for the Los Angeles Dons of the All-America Football Conference; his second run at a professional football career was cut short by a series of heart attacks that started when he was only 30 years old. He was forced to leave the game in 1948 after three seasons with the Dons.

=== Politics ===
Kimbrough was elected to the Texas House of Representatives in 1953 as a Democrat.

== Personal life ==
Kimbrough died May 8, 2006, in Haskell, Texas. The cause of death was pneumonia.
