= Alex Drobnitch =

American football player (1913–1960)

Profile
- Position: Guard

Personal information
- Born: November 25, 1913; Denver, Colorado, U.S.
- Died: June 2, 1960 (aged 46); Kersey, Colorado, U.S.
- Listed weight: 189 lb (86 kg)

Career information
- College: Denver
- NFL draft: 1937: 5th round, 41st overall pick

Career history
- New York Yankees (1937); St. Louis Gunners (1939); Buffalo Indians (1940); New York Americans (1941)

Awards and highlights
- First-team All-American (1936); Third-team All-American (1935)

Alex Lewis Drobnitch (November 25, 1913 – June 2, 1960) was an American football player. He played college football for the Denver Pioneers football team and was selected by the Newspaper Enterprise Association as a first-team guard on the 1936 College Football All-America Team. He was drafted in the fifth round of the 1937 NFL Draft. He later played professional football for New York Yankees in 1937, the Buffalo Indians in 1940, and the New York Americans in 1941. He was inducted into the University of Denver Athletic Hall of Fame in 1996.

Drobntich was born on November 25, 1913, in Denver. He raised on a farm near Eaton, Colorado. Drobntich died on June 2, 1960.
