= Alec Shellogg =

American football player (1914–1968)

Profile
- Position: Tackle

Personal information
- Born: February 17, 1914; New Castle, Pennsylvania, U.S.
- Died: July 12, 1968 (aged 54)

Career information
- College: Notre Dame

Career history
- 1939: Chicago Bears
- 1939: Brooklyn Dodgers
- 1940: Buffalo Indians
- 1941: Buffalo Tigers

Alec Regis Shellogg (February 17, 1914 – July 12, 1968) was an American professional football player in the National Football League as well as the third American Football League. In 1939, he played in the NFL for the Chicago Bears and the Brooklyn Dodgers. In 1940 and 1941 he played in the AFL for the Buffalo Indians/Tigers. He earned all-AFL honors both years in the league. He was also one of over 1,000 NFL personnel who served in the military during World War II.

Prior to his professional career, Shellogg played at the college level while attending Notre Dame. He was a two-time letterman in 1936 and 1937. He was even elected captain of the 1938 Notre Dame team.

He died on July 12, 1968, of a heart attack.
