= Ed Karpowich =

American football player (1912–2005)

No. 35, 36, 79
- Position: Tackle

Personal information
- Born: September 28, 1912; Duquesne, Pennsylvania, U.S.
- Died: November 26, 2005 (aged 93); Sunland, California, U.S.
- Listed height: 6 ft 4 in (1.93 m)
- Listed weight: 220 lb (100 kg)

Career information
- High school: Duquesne; Dickinson Seminary
- College: Catholic (1932-1935)
- NFL draft: 1936: 8th round, 66th overall pick

Career history
- Pittsburgh Pirates (1936–1940); Buffalo Indians (1940)

Awards and highlights
- Orange Bowl champion (1936)

Career NFL statistics
- Games played: 36
- Games started: 16
- Rushing yards: 15
- Stats at Pro Football Reference

Edwin Walter Karpowich (September 28, 1912 – November 26, 2005) was an American professional football tackle who played for five seasons with the Pittsburgh Pirates of the National Football League (NFL). He was drafted by the Pirates in the eighth round of the 66th pick in the 1936 NFL draft. He played college football at Catholic University for the Catholic University Cardinals football team.
