= American Football League (1936) =

Professional American football league that operated from 1936 to 1937

- Sport: American football
- Founded: 1935
- First season: 1936
- Folded: 1937
- No. of teams: 8
- Last champion: Los Angeles Bulldogs (1937)

The American Football League (AFL) was a professional American football league that operated in 1936 and 1937. The AFL operated in direct competition with the more established National Football League (NFL) throughout its existence. While the American media generally ignored its operation (often relegating game coverage to "page filler" status), this second AFL was the first "home" of the Cleveland Rams, which joined the National Football League after one year in the AFL.

In 1937, the Los Angeles Bulldogs, the first professional football team to play its home games on the West Coast, also became the first professional football team to win a league championship with a perfect record (no losses, no ties) – 11 years before the Cleveland Browns (AAFC) and 35 years before the Miami Dolphins (NFL) accomplished the same feat.

== Origin ==
The brainchild of former New York Giants personnel director Harry March, plans for the formation of the second American Football League were announced on November 12, 1935. Fifteen cities bid for charter franchises for the new league, and on April 11, 1936, eight (Boston, Cleveland, Jersey City, New York, Philadelphia, Pittsburgh, Providence, and Syracuse) were awarded.

Within a few months, Jersey City, Providence, and Philadelphia pulled out and Rochester was granted a franchise. Two weeks later, the newest franchise was transferred to Brooklyn even though there was no stadium available at the time.

The league was envisioned to be a "players league", with veteran players involved in the management of the participating teams. March served as the AFL's president until his resignation in October. He was succeeded by James Bush, president of the New York Yankees AFL franchise.

Most of the new AFL franchises were built on the raiding of nearby NFL franchises in the league's first season. While first-season AFL champion Boston did not plunder the roster of the struggling Redskins team, the New York Yankees and Pittsburgh Americans had no such qualms with their crosstown rivals, the Giants and the Pirates. Similarly the Cleveland Rams signed their head coach, Damon Wetzel, from the backfield of the Chicago Bears.

== Teams ==
Primary locations of the 1936-37 American Football League

Boston Shamrocks. The offensive powerhouse of the AFL in the 1936 season, the George Kenneally-led Shamrocks were in a three-way battle with Cleveland and New York for the league championship when Boston beat the other two on consecutive weeks at the end of the season. The following year, the Shamrocks were beset with player defections and struggled to a 2–7 record. Playing its home games at Fenway Park and Braves Field, the team folded along with the league at the end of the 1937 season.

Brooklyn Tigers. Awarded a franchise in 1936 although no home field was available in Brooklyn, the Tigers had a short, troubled existence. In mid-November, the team moved to Rochester (changing its name to the Rochester Tigers) and played in Red Wing Stadium despite the failure of another AFL team based in that city mere weeks before. The team limped to the end of the 1937 season before fading into oblivion. The Tigers were coached by Mike Palm, who owned the team along with Harry Newman.

Cleveland Rams. Owned by Homer Marshman and playing its home games in Cleveland Municipal Stadium, the Rams competed in the AFL for only one season (finishing second with a 5–2–2 record) with the league's stingiest defense and one of the league's two most potent offenses (along with Boston). When the NFL announced that it was willing to expand, Marshman applied for a franchise in the more-established league (along with representatives from Houston and Los Angeles). As a result, the Rams left the AFL for the 1937 season, to be replaced by the group from Los Angeles whose NFL application was turned down. The 1936 Rams had Sid Gillman as a rookie end in his only season as an active professional player. The Rams are the only team from this league to still exist in the present day, albeit as the Los Angeles Rams (and formerly, the St. Louis Rams).

New York Yankees. The second New York Yankees football team for an American Football League was coached by Jack McBride and featured the talents of star back Ken Strong. Team president James Bush doubled as league president in the latter half of the 1936 season. Like the defending league champion Boston Shamrocks, the 1937 Yankees team was plagued by player defections to the NFL. Unlike the other New York Yankees football teams, the Yankees of AFL II had two home stadia: Yankee Stadium and Triborough Stadium on Randall's Island.

Pittsburgh Americans. While the Americans were holding their own on the football field in 1936, they lagged the rest of the league in attendance (2500 average attendance for home games in Forbes Field); although the Americans survived the first season as a middle-of-the-pack AFL team, the team was folded after the third game in 1937. The Americans were not without stars: they signed former Pirates Ben Smith and Loran Ribble.

Syracuse Braves. The existence of the Braves was doomed from lack of fan support while losing every game at Municipal Stadium (Don Irwin and end Red Badgro were the head coaches). The team moved to Rochester at midseason and called itself the Rochester Braves for a few weeks before calling it quits. At the lone home game in Red Wing Stadium (November 1, 1936) the second half was delayed 40 minutes by Braves players demanding back pay. The game was finished; the franchise folded immediately afterward. Soon afterwards, another AFL team (Brooklyn) followed the Braves to Rochester in an effort to survive the 1936 season.

Cincinnati Bengals. Not related to the current NFL franchise, the Bengals joined the AFL for the 1937 season. Playing at Crosley Field, the team was a steady draw despite the team having a losing record. When the league folded at the end of the year, the Bengals continued as an independent team for 1938, joined the short-lived minor American Professional Football Association for 1939, and became a charter member of the third AFL in 1940. Hal Pennington was the team's originator; he was also the first head coach and general manager of the Bengals.

Los Angeles Bulldogs. While an independent team, the Bulldogs defeated the Philadelphia Eagles in 1936. After being turned down for the NFL for the 1937 season, the Bulldogs joined the AFL and became the first professional football team to play its home games on the West Coast. Averaging 14,000 in attendance for its home games in Gilmore Stadium, the Bulldogs were drawing twice as many fans per game as the rest of the league. Los Angeles did not lose or tie a game in its one season with the AFL, the first professional football team to win its league title with a perfect record. When the league folded at the end of the season, the Gus Henderson-led Bulldogs continued on as an independent team before joining the minor league American Professional Football Association in 1939 and becoming a charter member of the Pacific Coast Professional Football League the following year.

== League standings ==
=== Final 1936 standings ===
Team	W	L	T	Pct.	PF	PA
Boston Shamrocks	8	3	0	.727	133	97
Cleveland Rams	5	2	2	.714	123	77
New York Yankees	5	3	2	.625	75	74
Pittsburgh Americans	3	2	1	.600	78	65
Syracuse/Rochester Braves	1	6	0	.147	51	113
Brooklyn/Rochester Tigers	0	6	1	.000	58	82

=== Final 1937 standings ===
Team	W	L	T	Pct.	PF	PA
Los Angeles Bulldogs	8	0	0	1.000	219	69
Rochester Tigers	3	3	1	.500	94	115
New York Yankees	2	3	1	.400	57	115
Cincinnati Bengals	2	3	2	.400	102	89
Boston Shamrocks	2	5	0	.286	76	98
Pittsburgh Americans	0	3	0	.000	7	69

== All-League selections ==
There was no All-League team named for the 1936 season.

=== 1937 ===
Bill Moore, Los Angeles (end)
Bill Steinkemper, Cincinnati (tackle)
Pete Mehringer, Los Angeles (guard)
Lee Mulleneaux, Cincinnati (center)
Alex Drobnitch, New York (guard)
Harry Field, Los Angeles (tackle)
Red Fleming, Boston (end)
Harry Newman, Rochester (quarterback)
Don Geyer, Cincinnati (halfback)
Al Nichelini, Los Angeles (halfback)
Gordon Gore, Los Angeles (fullback)

== Demise of the second AFL ==
While league champion contenders Boston, Cleveland, and the Yankees were consistent draws in 1936 (Boston nearly outdrawing the NFL rival Redskins, which moved to Washington the following year), the other three franchises presented problems for the AFL. Pittsburgh drew only 2500 customers per home game, Syracuse drew less than 5000 before moving to Rochester (and folding after one game), and Brooklyn didn't have a home until the team followed the Braves to Rochester. With the departure of two franchises (the Braves and the Rams), it was clear that change was in order for the AFL.

In the beginning of 1937, the league inaugurated its third president in less than 14 months, J. J. Schafer, added Jack Dempsey and Bing Crosby to its board, and proceeded to restock its franchise line-up with a franchise in a city in which an NFL franchise failed a mere three years earlier (Cincinnati) and a team based in Los Angeles whose application to join the more established league was turned down in favor of the Rams.

Unlike the NFL, AFL teams tended to have local interest only. Out-of-town newspapers rarely covered the league's activities, and when they did, the coverage was usually a bare-bones mention of the scores inserted as page filler.

Three weeks into the 1937 season, the poorly-drawing Pittsburgh Americans gave up the ghost while the other eastern teams were suffering the results of player raids by NFL teams (defending champion Boston was virtually gutted, leaving it in no shape to repeat its success).

The entry of the Los Angeles Bulldogs into the league also helped lead to the league's demise. The new team simply overwhelmed the rest of the AFL as the only team with a winning record. The Bulldogs played all of its away games in the first half of the season and then finished the demolition as they stayed home for the second half. While the Bulldogs had attendance figures comparable to that of the 1936 Shamrocks and Yankees (about 14,000 per home game), the former eastern powers lost their draw. Shamrocks owner Bill Scully noted that the team lost $37,000 in 1937; the rest of the league (excluding Los Angeles) fared worse.

With the optimism that began the 1937 season gone, the second American Football League closed up shop at the end of the season.

== After the second AFL ==
While the existence of the second American Football League was relatively brief, its influence in American sports was actually more than realized at that time. It introduced major league football to the West Coast, which had a team based in Los Angeles and played its games there (whereas the Los Angeles Buccaneers, a prior NFL team, was a traveling team based in Chicago).

The success of the Boston Shamrocks, particularly at the gate, was also a factor in George Preston Marshall moving his Boston Redskins to Washington. The AFL was also the first "home league" of the Cleveland Rams, which exist today as the Los Angeles Rams.

The Los Angeles Bulldogs returned to the independent circuit in 1938, as did the Cincinnati Bengals, which joined the fledgling minor league, the American Professional Football Association, in 1939 and became a charter member of the third AFL in 1940. The Bulldogs also joined the APFA for 1939 before becoming a charter member of the Pacific Coast Professional Football League in 1940.

In 1968, 27 years after the collapse of the third AFL, the Bengals name would be revived by Paul Brown for his Cincinnati expansion franchise in the fourth AFL, a team that continues to play in the NFL.

== See also ==
- American Football League (1926)
- American Football League (1940)
