= Columbus Bullies =

Professional football team from 1938 to 1942

General information
- Founded: 1939
- Folded: 1942
- Stadium: Red Bird Stadium
- Headquartered: Columbus, Ohio, United States
- Colors: Red, Orange, White

Team history
- Columbus Bullies (1939–41)

League / conference affiliations
- American Football League II (1939); American Football League III (1940–41)

Championships
- AFL Championships: 2; 1940, 1941

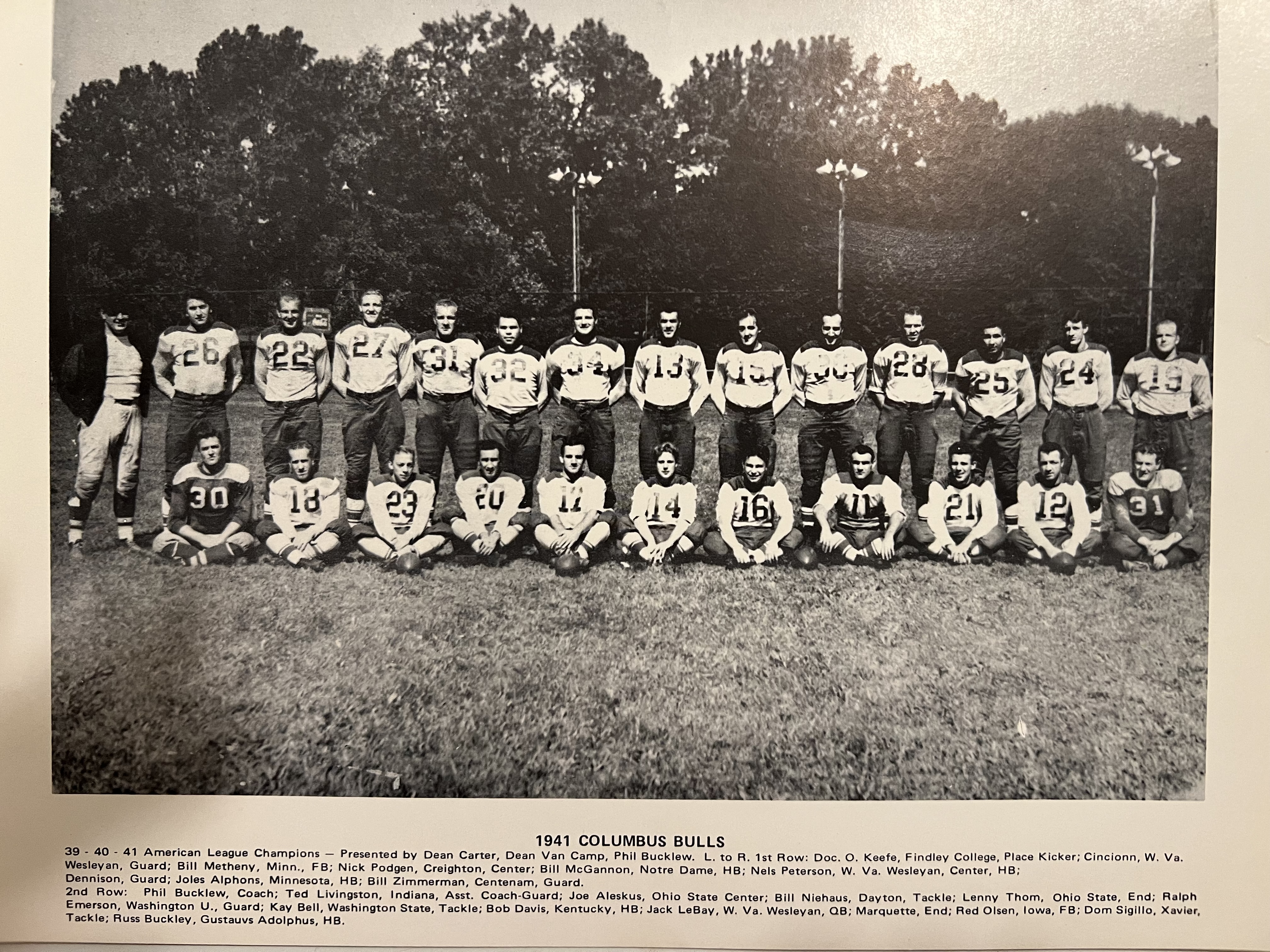

The Columbus Bullies were a professional football team founded by Dean Carter in Columbus, Ohio, in 1938. The Bullies started out as a member of the American Professional Football Association (APFA) in 1939. Later, in 1940, the Bullies joined the Cincinnati Bengals and Milwaukee Chiefs in leaving the APFA and becoming charter members of a new American Football League. Playing in Red Bird Stadium, the Bullies won both AFL Championships prior to ceasing operations when the AFL disbanded due to World War II. The Bullies defeated the Milwaukee Chiefs in 1940, and the New York Americans in 1941 in the only two AFL Championships.

At the beginning of the 1941 season, the Bullies accepted a challenge from the defending Western Interprovincial Football Union champion Winnipeg Blue Bombers for a three-game series; the Bombers had been banned from Grey Cup contention that year due to rules discrepancies between the WIFU and the other organizations playing Canadian football at the time. The Bullies and Blue Bombers played three games, at least partially by Canadian rules (as one of the games, the deciding third game, had Winnipeg's final score as 1 point, which was not then possible in the American game). Winnipeg won the first game 19–12, making the Bullies one of only two major league American football teams to have ever lost to a current Canadian Football League team. (The other American team to lose to a Canadian team is the modern Buffalo Bills, who lost to the Hamilton Tiger-Cats in 1961.) The Bullies responded, however, by defeating Winnipeg twice in the next two games, 6–0 and 31–1. Columbus won the series, 2–1.

== Yearly records ==
=== APFA ===
Year	W	L	T	Pct.
1939	8	1	1	.889

=== AFL ===
Year	W	L	T	Pct.
1940	8	1	1	.889
1941	5	1	2	.833
