= Midwest Football League (1935–1940) =

Defunct American football league (1935–1940)

- Sport: American football
- Founded: 1935
- First season: 1936
- Folded: 1940
- President: George J. Heitzler
- Claim to fame: Precursor to the 3rd competitor of National Football League
- No. of teams: Unknown (1935); 7 (1936); 6 (1937–1938); 8 (1939)
- Country: United States
- Last champion: Columbus Bullies
- Most titles: Louisville Tanks (3)

The Midwest Football League (MFL) was a professional American football minor league that existed from 1935 to 1940. Originally comprising teams from Ohio, Kentucky, Indiana, and Illinois, the league eventually expanded its reach to include teams from Missouri, Tennessee, Wisconsin, and California to become a national league with major league aspirations by 1939. In 1938, the league became the American Professional Football League after the collapse of the second major league of the same name, but changed its name once again the following year to American Professional Football Association (APFA). (Note: Not to be confused with the APFA of the early 1920s, which became the National Football League (NFL).) Some sources refer to it as the American Professional Football League.

Originally without major league aspirations, the APFA changed its ambition along with its name in 1939 when it admitted the Cincinnati Bengals and Los Angeles Bulldogs, two teams that survived the 1937 AFL collapse and spent the 1938 season as independent teams. Another independent Ohio team, the Columbus Bullies, also joined the loop for 1939.

After the end of the 1939 season, the league was preparing to continue as a major league (with Milwaukee replacing Los Angeles in the lineup) when eastern businessmen lured Cincinnati, Columbus, and Milwaukee to join teams based in Boston, Buffalo, and New York to form a new American Football League. The resulting split doomed the APFA, as two members folded and two others were turned away from membership in the new league.

== Midwest Football League (1935–1937) ==
The Midwest Football League was formed in 1935 with George J. Heitzler as president and James C. Hogan as secretary-treasurer. Like the National Football League in its first year, it was a loose assemblage of teams from the American Midwest, with teams representing Cincinnati, Dayton, Indianapolis, Louisville, Columbus, Ohio, and Springfield, Illinois. The league did not maintain standings for its first year and declared the Cincinnati Models, Indianapolis Indians and Louisville Tanks tri-champions.

=== 1936 ===
Reino Nori, quarterback of the Springfield Bicos (a Detroit Lions farm club) in 1936.

In its second year the MFL was transformed from an informal collection of teams to an official minor league of professional American football. A second team from Cincinnati, the Treslers (named after sponsor Tresler Oil), was added and the 1935 tri-champion Indians were replaced by another team from Indianapolis, the Leons. After a regular season in which the Cincinnati Models finished with an undefeated, untied record, the Louisville Tanks defeated them in the league championship game, 2–0 Two weeks later, the Models defeated the Tanks in a rematch, 19–7, but the MWL considered the contest to be an exhibition game with no effect on the status of the league championship.

Final league standings – 1936

Team	W	L	T	Pct.	PF	PA
Cincinnati Models	6	0	0	1.000	149	13
Louisville Tanks	5	1	0	.833	123	26
Dayton Rosies	4	2	0	.333	69	38
Springfield Bicos	2	3	0	.400	24	59
Cincinnati Treslers	1	4	0	.200	33	84
Columbus Bobbs	0	4	0	.000	13	80
Indianapolis Leons	0	4	1	.000	0	111

Championship: Louisville Tanks 2, Cincinnati Models 0

Beaten by the Models both on and off the field, the Cincinnati Treslers – with quarterback Pete Rose, Sr. (father of baseball's Pete Rose) – left the MFL. That was not the only change involving a Cincinnati professional football team: Models head coach Hal Pennington was enticed by Queen City Athletics, Inc., to form a new team, this time to compete in a major pro football league: the Cincinnati Bengals of the second American Football League.

=== 1937 ===
The Treslers were not the only MFL team to leave the league in 1937. The Springfield Bicos and Columbus Bobbs also left, while the Ashland Armcos (named after a local steel manufacturing business) joined. With new player-coach John Wiethe, the Cincinnati Models returned to its winning ways, including a 95–7 demolition of the Indianapolis Indians, which failed to win a game for the second consecutive year. Only a loss to Ashland kept the Models from another unbeaten regular season.

The 1937 league championship game was a rematch of the two teams who battled for the title in 1936, with the same result: the Louisville Tanks shut out the Models to win its third title in the Tanks' third season of competition.

Final league standings – 1937

Team	W	L	T	Pct.	PF	PA
Cincinnati Models	6	1	0	.857	197	47
Louisville Tanks	6	3	0	.667	170	61
Ashland Ironmasters	5	3	1	.625	120	92
Dayton Rosies	3	5	0	.375	74	105
St. Louis Gunners	1	4	1	.200	50	60
Indianapolis Leons	0	5	0	.000	14	260

Championship: Louisville Tanks 13, Cincinnati Models 0

After the conclusion of the 1937 season, change was inevitable for the MFL as the second AFL imploded. Indianapolis left after two years without a win, Ashland departed after one winning season. The MFL quickly adopted the name of the recently deceased league and expanded its reach by adding teams in East Chicago, Indiana and Nashville, Tennessee. The Cincinnati Bengals (formerly of the second AFL) were asked to join the newly minted American Football League… and opted to remain an independent team instead.

On the other hand, Bengals head coach Hal Pennington did return to the Cincinnati Models, just in time to see the team's name change to the Cincinnati Blades.

== American Professional Football League (1938) ==
The Louisville Tanks won championships in the three years of the existence of the Midwest Football League. Prior to joining the AFL, the St. Louis Gunners were an independent team that actually played three games in the NFL in 1934 as a replacement for the ill-fated Cincinnati Reds. After the demise of the AFL, the Gunners returned to an independent status. The Cincinnati Blades disbanded October 13, 1938 (after playing three games, all Blades victories); the scheduled games were not cancelled, and as a result, they were officially recorded as forfeit losses for the Blades. League requests for the Cincinnati Bengals (a team that was founded by Blades head coach Hal Pennington) to replace the Blades for the remaining games were rebuffed.

=== 1938 standings ===
Team	W	L	T	Pct.	Off.	Def.
Chicago Indians	5	1	0	.833	87	26
St. Louis Gunners	4	3	1	.571	31	73
Louisville Tanks	4	3	0	.571	67	40
Nashville Rebels	2	2	1	.500	46	71
Cincinnati Blades	3	5	0	.375	53	11
Dayton Rosies	1	5	0	.167	7	80

Playoffs: Louisville defeated Chicago 13–0; St. Louis defeated Nashville 19–13
Championship: Louisville defeated St. Louis 3–0 to win fourth consecutive championship of MFL/AFL

Following the three Midwest Football League champions from 1935 to 1937, the Tanks became the first professional football team to win four consecutive league championships. Only the Cleveland Browns (AAFC 1945–1949, NFL 1950) have managed to match this feat so far.

== American Professional Football Association (1939) ==
The league changed its name once again in 1939 as it abandoned any pretense of being a regional league. After one year of being the American Football League, the league became the American Professional Football Association, ironically the original name of the professional football league that became the National Football League. The name of the league was not the only change for the season: the Dayton Rosies became the Dayton Bombers; the Nashville Rebels left the league after only one year of competition; and Wisconsin's Kenosha Cardinals and three familiar teams joined the loop for the upcoming season.

The Cincinnati Bengals and Los Angeles Bulldogs were members of the second AFL in 1937, with Los Angeles winning the championship with an undefeated, untied record. The Bengals and the Columbus Bullies became charter members of the successor to this league, the "third AFL" in 1940, with the Bullies winning the championship in both years of its existence. The Bulldogs became a charter franchise of the Pacific Coast League in 1940.

The Cincinnati Bengals were wooed by the league on at least three occasions before they finally agreed to join for the 1939 season. The Bengals were offered an opportunity to join the former Midwest Football League in 1938 (as a natural rival for the Cincinnati Models/Blades, and when the Blades stopped playing, the AFL asked the Bengals if they could take over the Blades' remaining games in the 1938 Blades' AFL schedule. Citing scheduling conflicts, the Bengals refused the invitation.

=== 1939 standings ===
Team	W	L	T	Pct.	Off.	Def.
Los Angeles Bulldogs	7	1	0	.875	223	35
Cincinnati Bengals	6	2	0	.750	117	85
Columbus Bullies	9	4	0	.692	235	81
Chicago Indians	4	3	0	.571	55	51
St. Louis Gunners	5	6	0	.455	141	164
Dayton Bombers	2	5	0	.286	45	167
Kenosha Cardinals	2	7	0	.222	97	105
Louisville Tanks	2	9	0	.182	51	226

There was no championship game in 1939. In a meeting of the owners of the APFA on January 7, 1940, the Columbus Bullies were announced as league champions with a 9–2 record, despite the standings shown above. It was the only time that the Louisville Tanks failed to win the league title.

== Demise of the league ==
As the 1939 season wound down, the league anticipated change as the Los Angeles Bulldogs left to form the football version of the Pacific Coast League. With the subsequent awarding of a new franchise to Milwaukee, the league announced plans to compete with the National Football League, while the Green Bay Packers protested the intrusion into their territory.

In July 1940, the league's ambitious plans for the upcoming season were derailed: a group of businessmen based on the American East Coast formed their own American Football League, with new franchises in Boston, New York, and Buffalo, and had APFA members Cincinnati, Columbus, and Milwaukee jumped to their league, which split the five-year-old league and mortally wounded it. After Louisville and Dayton both decided not to field teams for the 1940 season, only three teams (Chicago, Kenosha, and St. Louis) remained, and the APFA subsequently folded.

Kenosha and St. Louis applied to the new AFL for membership, but were rejected. They and the Chicago Indians rejoined the ranks of independent professional football teams in 1940, ironically often playing the teams that had jumped from the APFA in the first place. For two games in 1941, Kenosha also loaned three players to the AFL's Buffalo Tigers.
