= American Football League (1940) =

Former American football organization

- Sport: American football
- Founded: 1940
- First season: 1940
- Folded: 1941
- Claim to fame: 3rd competitor of National Football League
- No. of teams: 6 (1940), 5 (1941)
- Country: United States
- Status: Defunct
- Last champion: Columbus Bullies

The American Football League, also known retrospectively as the AFL III to distinguish it from earlier organizations of that name, was a professional American football league that operated from 1940 to 1941. It was created when three teams, the original Cincinnati Bengals, the Columbus Bullies, and the Milwaukee Chiefs, were lured away from the minor-league American Professional Football Association and joined three new franchises in Boston, Buffalo, and New York City in a new league. It competed against the National Football League (NFL), the oldest existing professional football league, which had been established in 1920 and reorganized in 1922.

The organization was the third major league to bear the name American Football League. Its establishment resulted in the dissolution of the American Professional Football Association, which had just announced its intentions to compete with the NFL as a major league organization. In 1941, the American Football League became the first football league to play a double round robin schedule (five home games and five away games). However, it folded after the end of the 1941 season.

== Origin ==
Although the third American Football League was not directly connected to any previous American football leagues of the same name, its formation was at the cost of an already-existing minor football league of the same name.

In the spring of 1940, the former American Professional Football Association announced intentions of turning itself into a major league with the addition of a Milwaukee team for the upcoming season, over the protests of the Green Bay Packers.

As the teams prepared for the upcoming season, the announcement of a rival major league resulted in the collapse of this edition of the American Football League. On July 14, 1940, a press conference introduced a new American Football League - not a continuation of the former minor league, but a new one with franchises in New York, Boston, and Buffalo. Bill Edwards, the president of the first AFL of 1926, was slated to be both the president of the new league and co-owner of the New York Yankees franchise, while Joseph Carr Jr., the son of recently deceased NFL president and Columbus Panhandles founder Joe Carr, was touted as a potential backer of the Columbus franchise.

The group of businessmen based on the American East Coast behind the formation of the new league had resorted to a trick done by the first two AFLs: they raided the established minor league by enticing APFA members Cincinnati, Columbus, and the new Milwaukee team to jump to their circuit.

The move fractured the APFA as two of its members decided not to field teams for 1940, while one the Los Angeles Bulldogs had already resigned from the league, and there were only three teams left with only two months to go before the start of the new season. After the Kenosha Cardinals and St. Louis Gunners applied to join the new league (and were subsequently rejected), the APFA went out of business.

After a 30-hour-long meeting of the owners (and other representatives) of the six invited teams in Buffalo's Hotel Lafayette, the bylaws and officials of the new league were determined. Each team was scheduled to play a double round robin schedule (five home games, five away games), with games on either Sunday or Wednesday to reduce the likelihood of conflicts with baseball teams sharing the stadium in five of the six AFL cities (all except Buffalo). The agreement was signed by the team owners on October 5, 1940.

While Bill Edwards did not take over the league as previously announced (that job eventually went to former Ohio State University publicity director William D. Griffith), the 1940 season began with six teams owned by people who were, for the most part, in better financial standing than their NFL counterparts. In the NFL, many of the owners had their franchise as their primary investment and source of income, while the AFL of 1940 had most of the owners with money invested in many other fields, such as local newspapers.

== Teams ==
The third American Football League had teams playing in six U.S. markets

Boston Bears. Disbanded in 1941, before the beginning of the second AFL season.

Buffalo Indians. Became the Buffalo Tigers for the 1941 season after a change in ownership.

Cincinnati Bengals. Previously a member of the second AFL, and the American Professional Football Association, the "original Bengals" joined the third AFL with traditional rival Columbus Bullies.

Columbus Bullies. Former APFA member which won the AFL championship both years the league was in existence. Quarterback Jay Arnold, formerly of the Philadelphia Eagles, led the team in 1940; when Arnold returned to the Eagles in 1941, John LeBay took over the signal calling role.

Milwaukee Chiefs. Former APFA member joined the AFL without being in an official APFA contest.

New York Yankees. The third major league professional football team with the name, it became the New York Americans in 1941 after a change of ownership.

== League standings and All-League teams ==
=== Final 1940 standings ===
Team	W	L	T	Pct.	PF	PA
Columbus Bullies	8	1	1	.889	134	69
Milwaukee Chiefs	7	2	0	.778	180	59
Boston Bears	5	4	1	.556	120	79
New York Yankees	4	5	0	.444	138	138
Buffalo Indians	2	8	0	.200	45	138
Cincinnati Bengals	1	7	0	.125	53	187

==== 1940 All-League Team ====
Sherman Barnes, Milwaukee (end)
Ed Karp, Buffalo (tackle)
Jim Karcher, Columbus (guard)
Joe Alexus, Columbus (center)
Alex Drobnitch, Buffalo (guard)
Bob Eckl, Milwaukee (tackle)
Harlan Gustafson, New York (end)
Andy Karpuls, Boston (quarterback)
Bill Hutchinson, New York (halfback)
Nelson Peterson, Columbus (halfback)
Al Novakofski, Milwaukee (fullback)

=== Final 1941 standings ===
Team	W	L	T	Pct.	Off.	Def.
Columbus Bullies	5	1	2	.833	142	55
New York Americans	5	2	1	.714	116	73
Milwaukee Chiefs	4	3	1	.571	105	84
Buffalo Tigers	2	6	0	.250	72	172
Cincinnati Bengals	1	5	2	.167	69	120

Encouraged by the success of the New York and Columbus franchises, Detroit, Baltimore, and Philadelphia applied to join the league for the 1941 season. While the Detroit application was accepted for play in 1942, the latter two were turned down by a league that was not interested in further expansion.

Promoter Douglas Grant Hertz purchased the New York Yankees, changed their name to the New York Americans, and then announced (in August) the team's withdrawal from the league. The league refused to acknowledge the "withdrawal." Boston folded before the start of the 1941 season. Buffalo changed the team name upon new ownership assuming control of the team. New York Americans president William D. Cox became the new AFL league president in 1941.

==== 1941 All-League Team ====
Earl Ohlgren, Milwaukee (end)
Alec Shellogg, Buffalo (tackle)
Ted Livinston, Columbus (guard)
Paul Humphrey, Milwaukee (center)
Tex Akin, Milwaukee (guard)
Bob Eckl, Milwaukee (tackle)
Joe Kruse, Cincinnati (end)
Bob Davis, Columbus (quarterback)
Charlie Armstrong, New York (halfback)
Bill McGannon, Cincinnati (halfback)
John Kimbrough, New York (fullback)

Columbus was league champion again in 1941, with a final record of 5-1-2.

== Demise of the third major league AFL ==
Although the AFL lost the Boston Bears franchise prior to the beginning of the 1941 season, its owners were optimistic about the league's long-term future. Although the league's average attendance was less than that of the more-established NFL, the AFL seemed to be on as firm a financial footing as the older league. By the end of the 1941 season, a new franchise was awarded to Detroit for the 1942 season. The league was the first major football league to complete a double round robin schedule, in which each team played each other twice.

All the plans for 1942 came to a sudden stop upon the Japanese attack on Pearl Harbor and the United States' entry into World War II on December 7, 1941. During the winter of 1941–42, numerous players from both leagues were drafted into the U.S. military. So many players went overseas that several AFL and NFL teams were left with barely enough players to field viable teams. It soon became apparent to the AFL owners that the success of the league was very much in question.

On September 2, 1942, AFL president William D. Cox announced the league would suspend operations for the war's duration.

We do not have the time to go into the football business this fall. I want to stress that there is no financial problem involved. Each team definitely has enough finances to continue.

— William B. Cox, September 2, 1942

The league did not return. The NFL was without a competitor until the formation of the All-America Football Conference in 1946, one year after the end of World War II.

== See also ==
- American Football League (1926)
- American Football League (1936)
