= Cincinnati Bengals (1937–1941) =

American professional football team

General information
- Founded: 1937
- Folded: 1942
- Stadium: Crosley Field (1937); Corcoran Stadium (1938–1941)
- Headquartered: Cincinnati, Ohio
- Colors: Black, Orange

Personnel
- Owners: Queen City Athletics, Inc.
- General manager: Hal Pennington (1937); Dana King (1938–1941)
- Head coach: Hal Pennington (1937); Dana King (1938–1941)

Team history
- Cincinnati Bengals (1937–41)

League / conference affiliations
- American Football League II (1937); Independent (1938); American Professional Football Association (1939); American Football League III (1940–1941)

The Cincinnati Bengals were a short-lived professional football team that played in Cincinnati, Ohio. It is unrelated to the current Cincinnati Bengals. Originated by Hal Pennington (who was also the team's first head coach and general manager), the team was formed as a member of the second American Football League in the 1937 season. The Bengals finished with a 2–3–2 record in their first year, but the league folded after the season, and Pennington returned to his former team, the Cincinnati Models, which would change its name to the Cincinnati Blades for an ill-fated 1938 campaign. Pennington was replaced by new player-coach Dana King, who would guide the Bengals for the remainder of the team's existence.

The Bengals continued as an independent team in 1938 (rejecting overtures from the former Midwest Football League, first as the league renamed itself the American Football League and in October 1938 after the dissolution of the Cincinnati Blades). In their one season as an independent, they defeated the Chicago Bears and tied the Chicago Cardinals.

In 1939, the team joined the newly renamed American Professional Football Association after yet another overture, finishing in second place with a 6–2–0 record. The APFA folded as Cincinnati, the Columbus Bullies, and the newly formed Milwaukee Chiefs defected to a newly formed major league, yet another American Football League, for the 1940 season.

In 1940 and 1941, the two Ohio AFL teams were fairly successful at the gate (rivaling their NFL counterparts), before the AFL suspended operations in response to the Pearl Harbor attack. Teams in both leagues were decimated by players being drafted, to the point that there weren’t enough players to field viable rosters in some cases. While the league had every intention of returning after the war (an expansion franchise was awarded to Detroit for the 1942 season before the United States entered World War II), the "third AFL" (and the fourth professional league with the name) never returned to business.

== Season-by-season ==
Cincinnati Bengals season by season league won-lost records (only league games count toward the total)

Year	W	L	T	Finish
1937	2	4	2	4th (AFL)
1938	Independent
1939	6	2	0	2nd (APFA)
1940	1	7	0	6th (AFL)
1941	1	5	2	5th (AFL)
