= Boston Bears =

Boston Bears and Boston Bears (football) may refer to:

- Boston Bears (AFL), team in third American Football League
- Boston Bears (soccer), team in American Soccer League
- Boston Bears (rugby league), team in the USA rugby league
