= Manger Hotels =

American hotel chain

- Industry: Hotel
- Founded: 1907
- Defunct: ~1980
- Fate: Closed
- Key people: William Manger; Julius Manger; Julius Manger Jr.

Manger Hotels (later Manger Hotels & Motor Inns) was a major 20th-century national chain of luxury hotels, full service motor inns, and upscale motels. Originally founded in 1907 as a chain of luxury hotels by Julius and William Manger, the company shifted to extensive development of large strategically located motor inns and motels in the 1960s.

== Early years ==
William and Julius Manger were born in Boonville, Missouri. William graduated from Valparaiso University and Julius graduated from Tulane University Law School. The brothers' first business was the International Coffee Company, which imported and sold coffee. The pair then entered the construction business, building homes in Galveston, Texas, and New York City. They eventually moved on to commercial projects, including the Builders' Exchange Building in Manhattan.

== Company history ==
=== Manger brothers ===
The Mangers entered the hotel business in 1907 when they traded the Builders' Exchange Building for the Plaza Hotel in Chicago. The pair then expanded their hotel operations to New York City, where they took over management of the Grand, Great Northern and Navarre hotels.

The Early Years

The Manger Hotels (New York City)

- Wolcott Hotel, 4 West 31st Street
- Hotel Imperial, 81st to 82nd Street and Broadway
- Great Northern Hotel, 118 West 57th Street
- Bell Apartment Hotel, Bronx, New York
- Times Square Hotel, 255 W. 43rd Street
- Hermitage Hotel, 42nd Street and 7th Avenue
- Cumberland Hotel, Broadway and 54th Street
- Endicott Hotel, 81st Street and Columbus Avenue
- Navarre Hotel, 38th Street, and 7th Avenue
- Grand Hotel, Broadway and 31st Street
- York Hotel, 36th Street and 7th Avenue
- Hotel Manger, 50-51 street, 7th avenue
- St. Regis Hotel, East 55th Street, 5th Avenue
- Gotham Hotel, 55th and Fifth Avenue
- Netherlands Hotel (Sherry Netherlands Hotel)
- Cumberland Hotel, Broadway at 54th Street
- Hotel Martha Washington, 29 to 30 East 30th Street
- Windsor Hotel, West 58th Street
- Hotel Aberdeen, West 32nd Street

The Manger Hotels (Washington DC)

- The Hay Adams Hotel, 800 16TH ST NW, WASHINGTON, DC 20006
- The Annapolis Hotel, 11to to 12th on H Streets, NW Washington, D.C
- The Hamilton Hotel, 1001 14th St NW Washington, DC 20005 United States

The Manger Hotels (Boston)

- The Manger Hotel, Boston & Maine R. R. Terminal and Boston Madison Square Garden, North Station

The Manger Hotels (Philadelphia)

- The Continental Hotel, (834 Chestnut Street in Center City, Philadelphia, Pennsylvania)

The Manger Hotels (Chicago)

- The Hotel Plaza, (Chicago, Clark and North, Lincoln Park)

In 1912 the Manger brothers purchased the 8-year lease on the New Grand Hotel from George H. Hurlburt. In 1922 they purchased the hotel from the Brooks estate. The adjoining Grand Hotel Annex, which was also managed by the Mangers but owned by William C. Adams, was purchased from Adams' estate in 1926.

The Mangers' next hotel was the Continental in Philadelphia.

In 1915 the pair took over the lease on the Hotel Netherland from the widow of its long time proprietor, H. P. Whitaker. At the time of the purchase, the Netherlands' residents included Alfred Holland Smith, James J. Coogan, and Edward W. Hatch.

In 1917, William and Julius Manger purchased the Endicott Hotel, which they had previously been leasing, for $1 million.

In 1920 the Mangers obtained a sublease on the Martha Washington Hotel from George C. Brown. Later that year the two purchased the Bell apartment house as well as the lease on the Hotel Cumberland. That same year they purchased The Gotham Hotel, which was managed by Weatherbee & Wood until the Mangers bought out their lease and took over management in 1927.

On January 18, 1923, they purchased the financially struggling Hermitage Hotel from the estate of Charles A. Cowen. One week later the Mangers purchased the Hotel Woodstock from T. Coleman du Pont and Lucius M. Boomer. The following month they purchased the Hotel Wolcott and acquired a 21-year lease on the William M. Sloane-owned Hotel York.

In 1924 the Hotel Claman, a hotel for men that had been completed the previous year, was bought by the Mangers. They soon changed the name to the Times Square Hotel and began providing accommodations to both men and women.

On October 22, 1924, it was announced that the Manger brothers had purchased a block on Seventh Avenue between 50th and 51st Streets from Realty Associates and Bing & Bing for approximately $5.5 million after plans for a sports arena on that site fell through. H. Craig Severance was hired to design a 2,250 room hotel for the property and Bing & Bing were named the general contractors for the project. The twenty-story, Spanish Renaissance-style Manger Hotel opened on November 15, 1926. When it opened, the Manger was the largest hotel in Times Square and the third largest in Manhattan. The total development cost of the Hotel Manger including the purchase of the 50-51 and 7th avenue block was close to $12,000,000.

In 1926, the Manger brothers reached an agreement with Vincent Astor to operate the St. Regis. This arrangement ended the following year when Astor bought out their lease as part of the hotel's sale to the Durham Realty Company.

The Manger hotel chain assisted Richard E. Byrd's expeditions by providing free room and office space for expedition personnel. At Byrd's recommendation, the Advisory Committee on Antarctic Names named a mountain in Antarctica Mount Manger for William Manger.

On July 8, 1928, William Manger, vice-president of the Manger chain, died in his apartment at the Grand Northern. He was 63 years old. A lifelong bachelor, Manger left the bulk of his estate to his brother Julius.

=== Julius Manger ===
On July 15, 1929, Manger Hotels and the Boston & Maine Railroad announced that the two parties had signed a contract for the construction of a hotel at B&M's new North Station facility. B&M and Manger would each hold 50% of the stock in the building company and the hotel would be leased to a company owned by Julius Manger. The cost of the building was to be $2.8 million. The Hotel Manger opened to the public on August 30, 1930. The 17-story hotel contained 500 rooms, a restaurant, private dining rooms, oyster bar, banquet hall/ballroom, barber shop, and beauty salon. At the time of its opening, the Hotel Manger had proportionately more marble than any other building in New England. The top floors offered views of the Charles River, Bunker Hill Monument, and Boston Harbor. The hotel had direct access to the Boston Garden and North Station.

In 1931, Manger sold the Times Square and Manger Hotel on 7th avenue and ended its leases on Grand Northern and Cumberland.

During The Great Depression, Manger purchased hotels in Washington D.C. In 1932 he purchased the Hay–Adams Hotel. By 1937 he also owned the Annapolis and Hamilton hotels.

In 1934, Manger purchased The Hotel Windsor in New York City.

On March 28, 1937, Julius Manger died suddenly in his suite at the Hay–Adams Hotel. He was 69 years old. When Julius Manger died in 1937 he was the largest independent hotel owner and operator in the United States as cited in the National Cyclopedia of American Biography.

=== Julius Manger Jr. ===
Following Julius Manger's death, Julius Manger Jr. became chairman of the board and Edward J. Carrol, who had been with the company since 1920, became managing director.

In 1939, Manger purchased the Hotel Rochester in Rochester, New York from the Metropolitan Life Insurance Company. The following year, Metropolitan Life sold the Hotel Rowe in Grand Rapids, Michigan to Manger. In 1941, Manger purchased the 21-story Vanderbilt Hotel in New York City from MetLife.

In 1953, Manger purchased The Allerton in Cleveland for about $2.4 million.

In 1954, Manger purchased the Hotel Savannah in Savannah, Georgia. Manger also owned a motel, the Towne and Country Motor Lodge, in Savannah.

In 1955, Manger introduced a family plan that allowed for children under 14 to stay for free in 9 of the chain's 11 hotels (The New York City Hotel Association outlawed family plans, so it was not available at the Windsor or Vanderbilt). Manger also provided babysitting, special menus, and gifts for children in order to entice more families to their hotels. By 1958, Manger's sales had increased sales by 5%.

In 1958, Manger purchased the DeWitt Clinton Hotel in Albany, New York from the Knott Hotels Corporation. Manger sold the hotel back to Knott five years later.

On January 30, 1959, the company sold its share of the Hotel Manger in Boston to the B&M Railroad. At the time of the sale, Julius Manger Jr. announced that the company was shifting its focus from luxury hotels to motels. In 1960, Manger opened the $2 million Manger Motor Inn in downtown Charlotte, North Carolina. The motel had 147 rooms and a 48-foot pool covered in the winter by a transparent plastic bubble. The company also obtained leases on the Tucson Inn in Tucson, Arizona and the Desert Sun in Phoenix, Arizona.

In 1960 the company diversified by announcing the creation of a private food brand. Manger would start by selling its own brand of coffee, returning the family to a business it had left more than 50 years prior. In 1961, Park Avenue Foods was formed to distribute Manger's food products.

In August 1961, Manger Hotels sold its Grand Rapids hotel for $515,000 to a nonprofit affiliated with the Fountain Street Church. The property later became a retirement community known as Olds Manor. In 1963 the company opened the Indianapolis Manger Motor Inn. On January 1, 1966, Manger closed its flagship hotel - The Manger Vanderbilt. Later that year, the Vanderbilt was sold for $3.625 million to an investment group that sought to convert the building into apartments. That same year, Manger sold its Rochester hotel to a local businessman. In 1968 the Tampa, Florida Manger Motor Inn opened.

=== Final years ===
After unsuccessfully trying to convince Cleveland State University to purchase the building for use as a dormitory, Manger sold its Cleveland hotel to local investors for $2 million in 1970. The following year the Indianapolis Manger Motor Inn became a Quality Inn. In 1972, the Manger Windsor was acquired by Harry Helmsley. The same year, Manger closed the Hamilton Hotel. It was sold to the Salvation Army for $1.2 million. In 1973, the Manger family sold the Hay–Adams Hotel to Washington developer Sheldon Magazine. In 1974 the Tampa Manger Motor Inn was sold to Hilton Hotels. It is now known as the Sheraton Tampa Riverwalk Hotel. By 1977, the Manger Building in Savannah was unoccupied and in the process of being converted into an office building. By 1980 the Manger Motor Inn in Charlotte had been sold and was known as the Executive Inn. It later served as a senior living center, office space, restaurant, and meeting space until it was demolished in 2006.

== Gallery ==
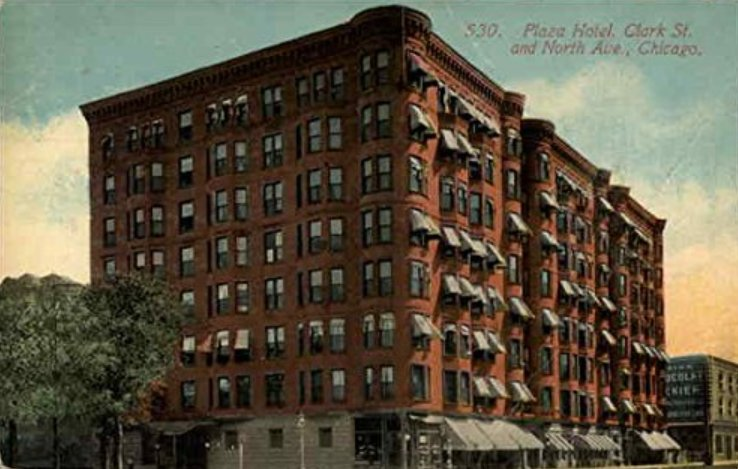
Plaza Hotel in 1913

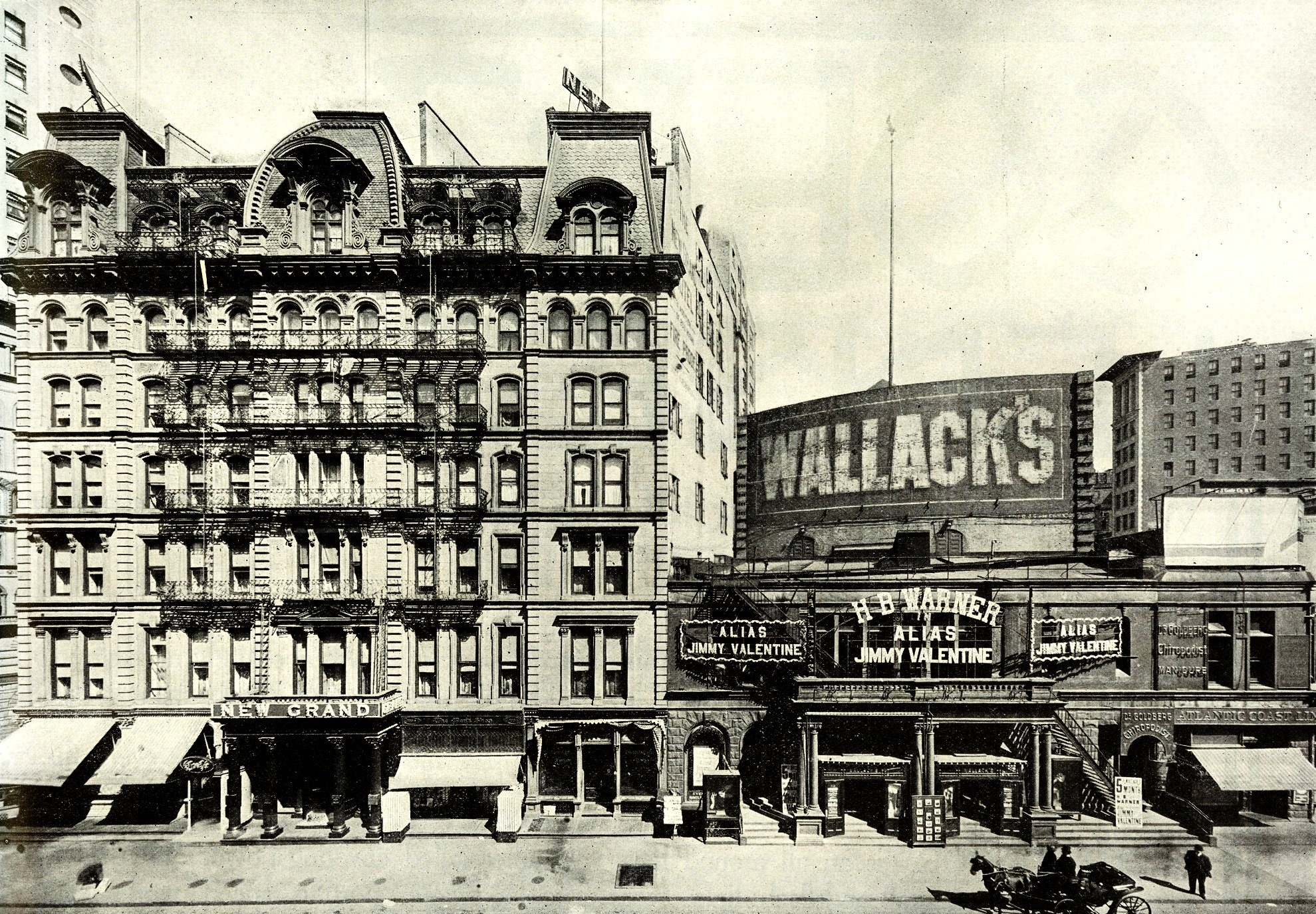
The New Grand Hotel (left) in 1910. At right is Wallack's Theatre

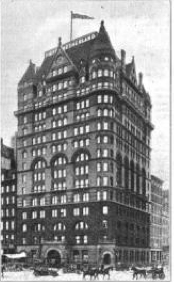
Hotel Netherland circa 1911

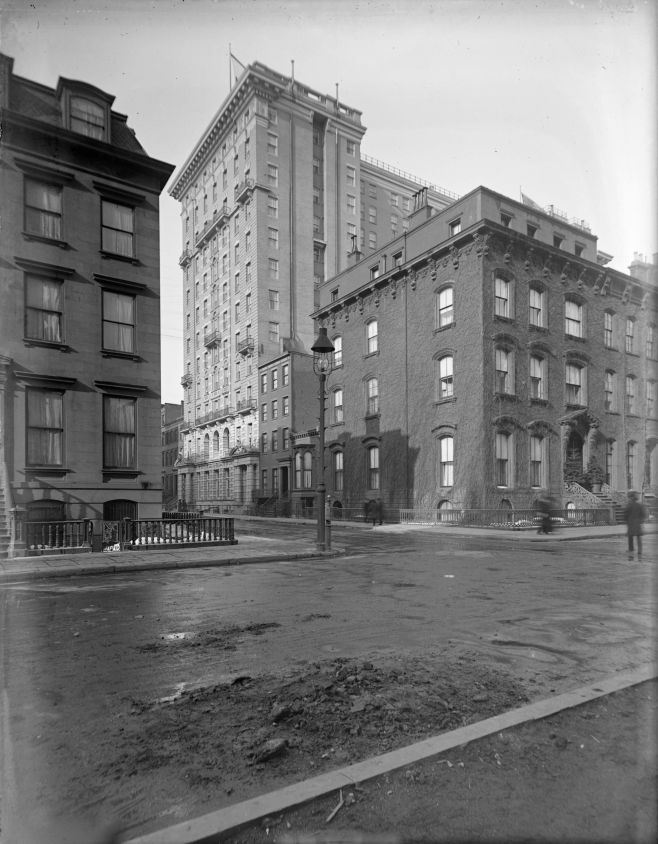
Martha Washington Hotel in February 1903, shortly after construction completed

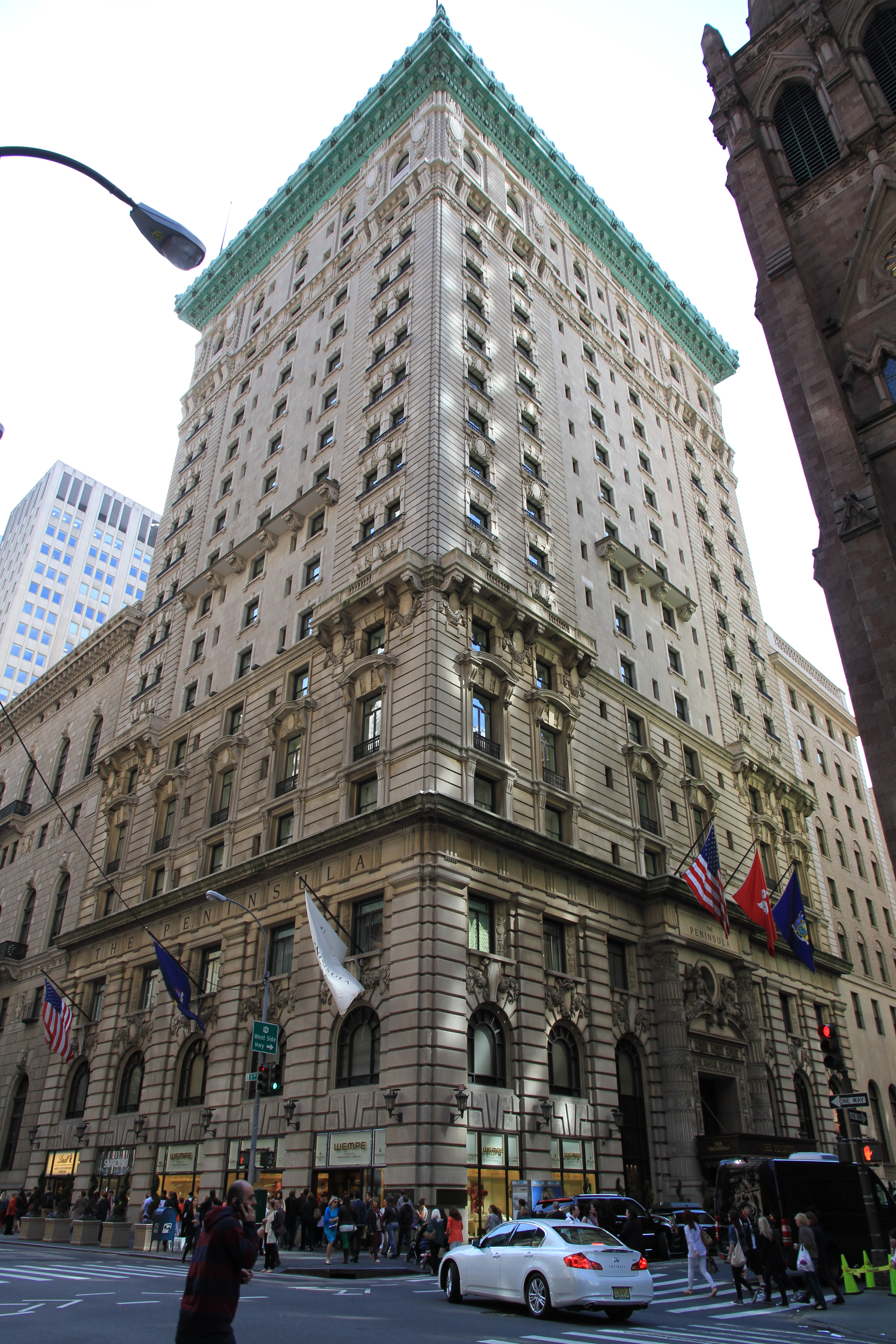
The Peninsula New York, formerly known as The Gotham Hotel

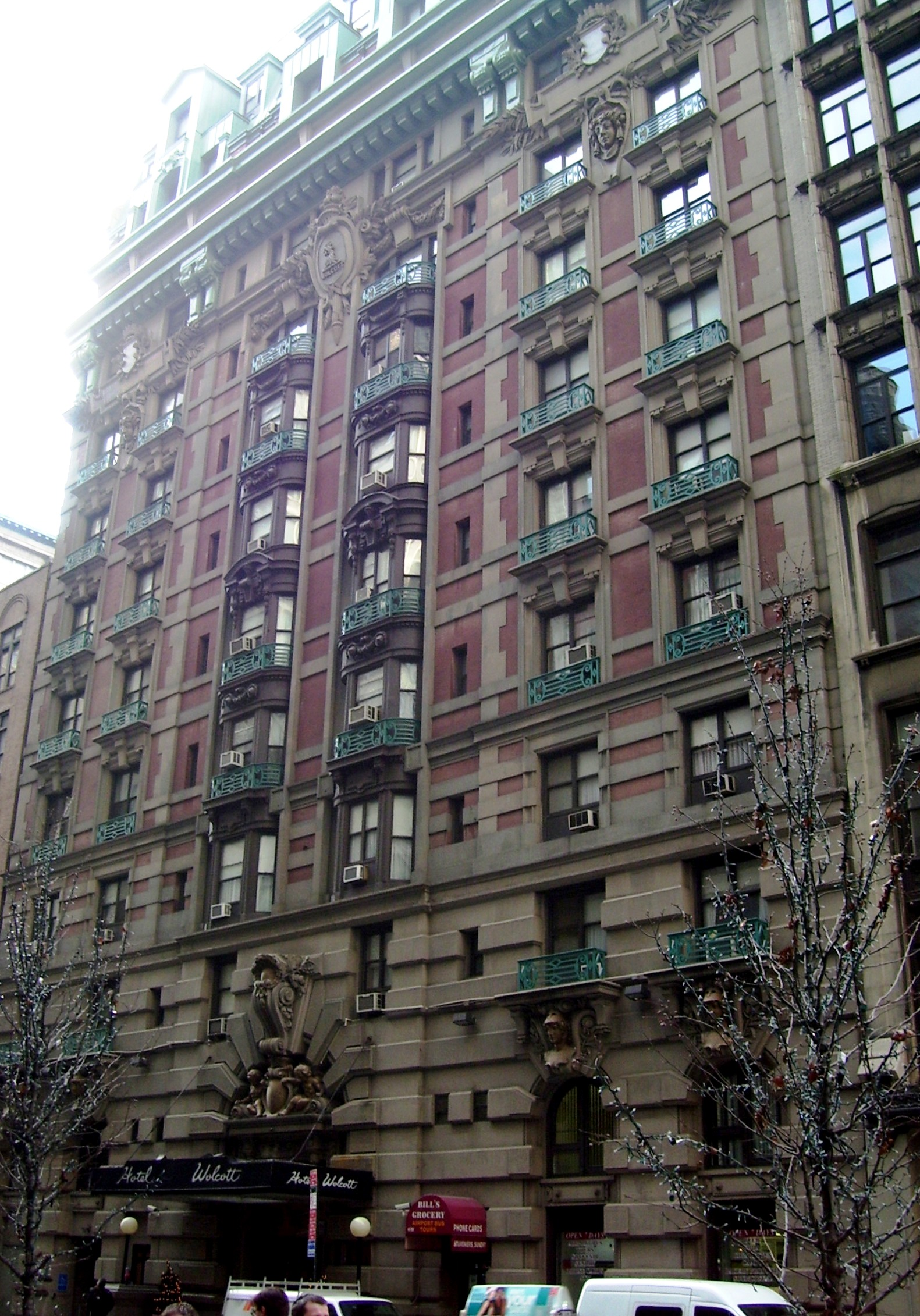
Hotel Wolcott

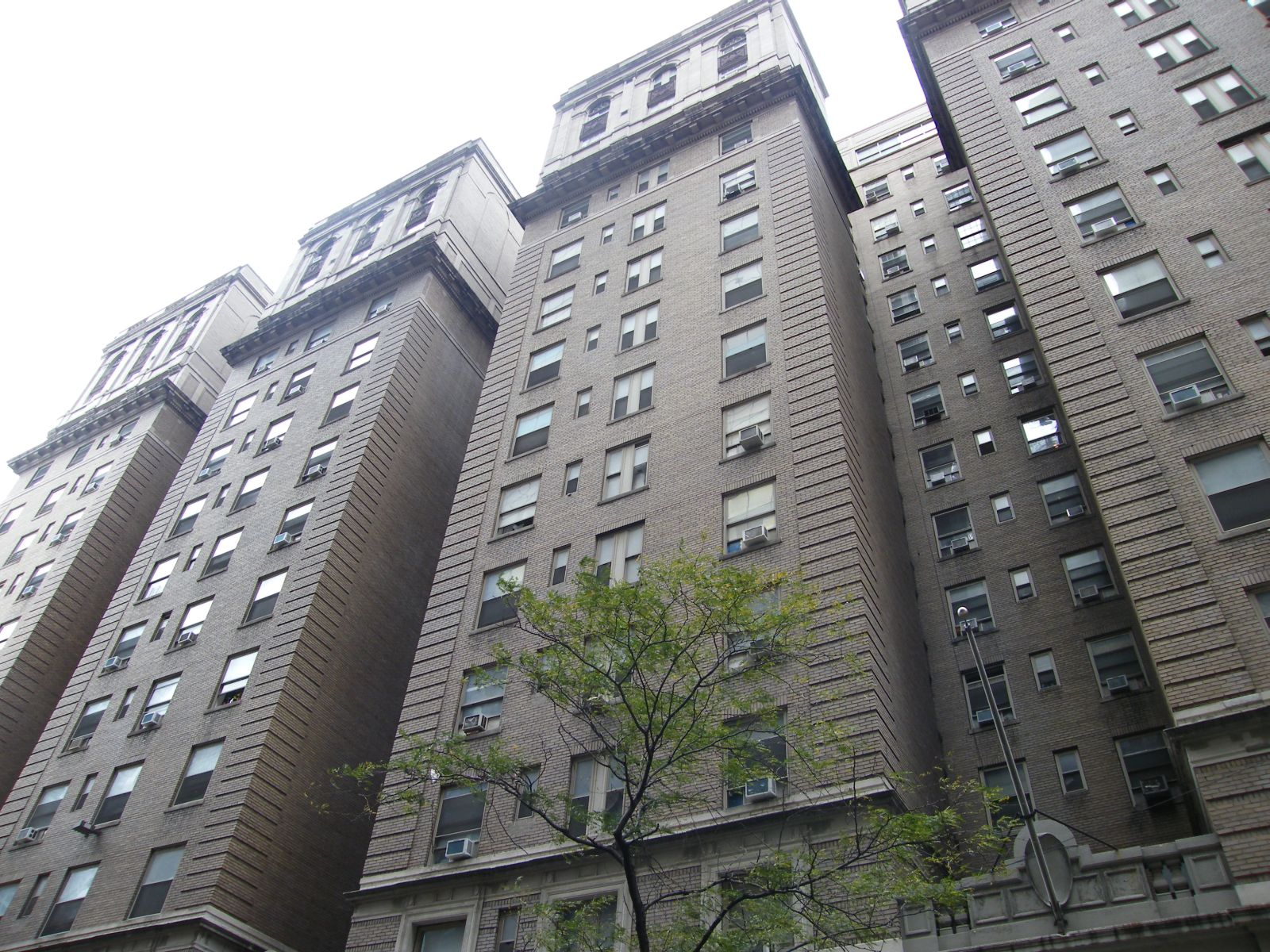
Times Square Hotel in 2008

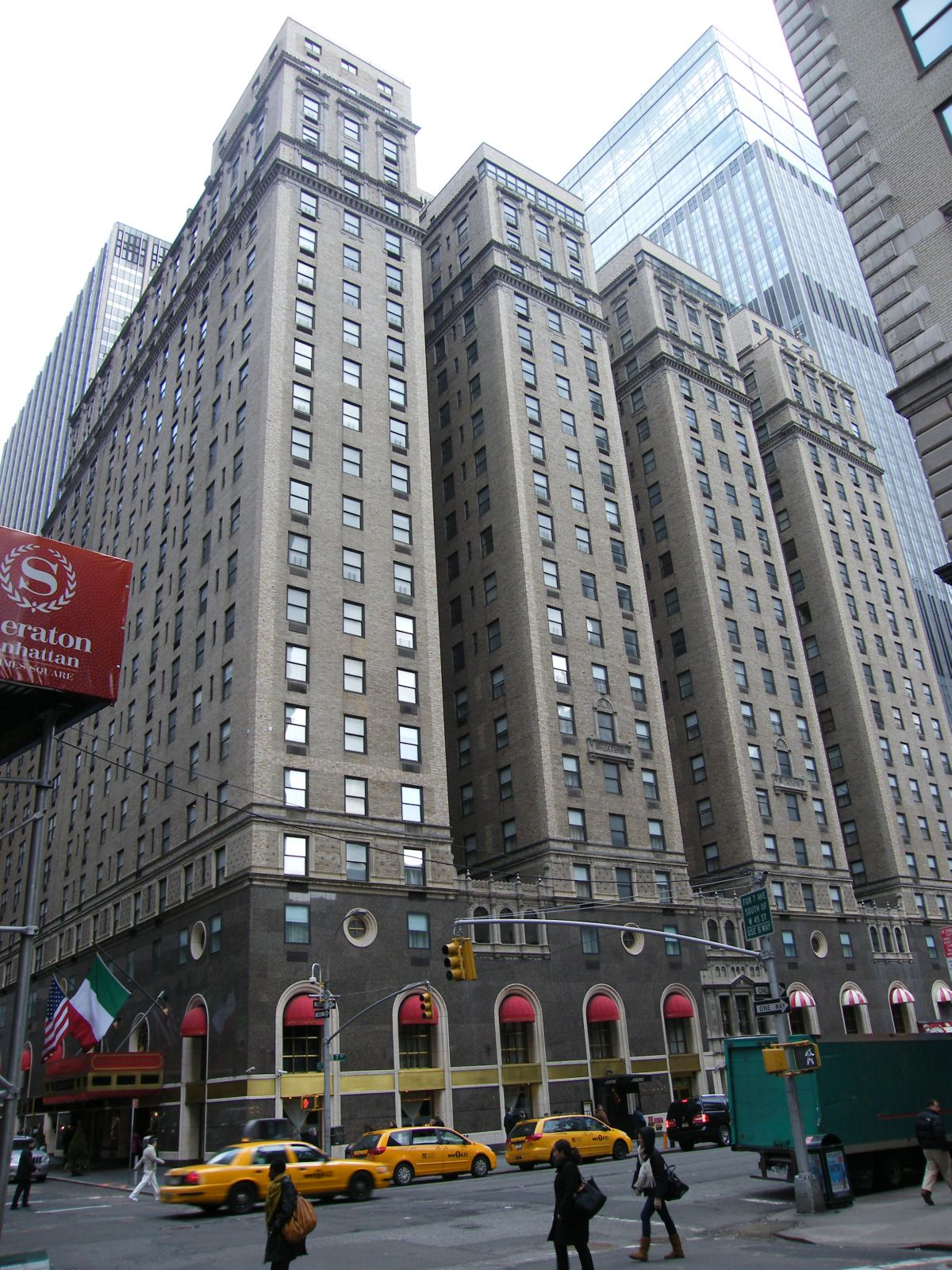
The Michelangelo, formerly known as the Manger Hotel

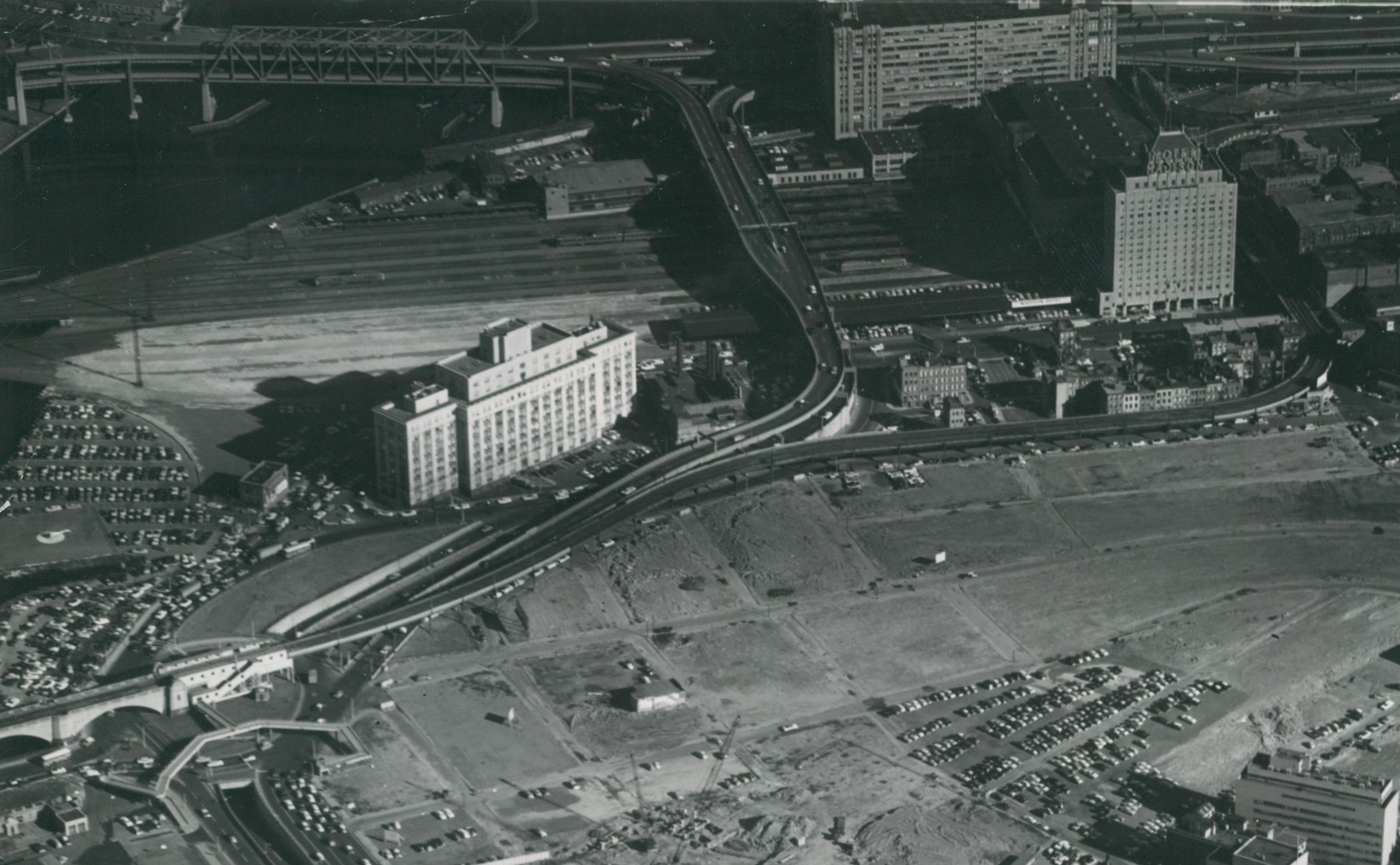
North Station area in early 1960s, The former Hotel Manger at upper right

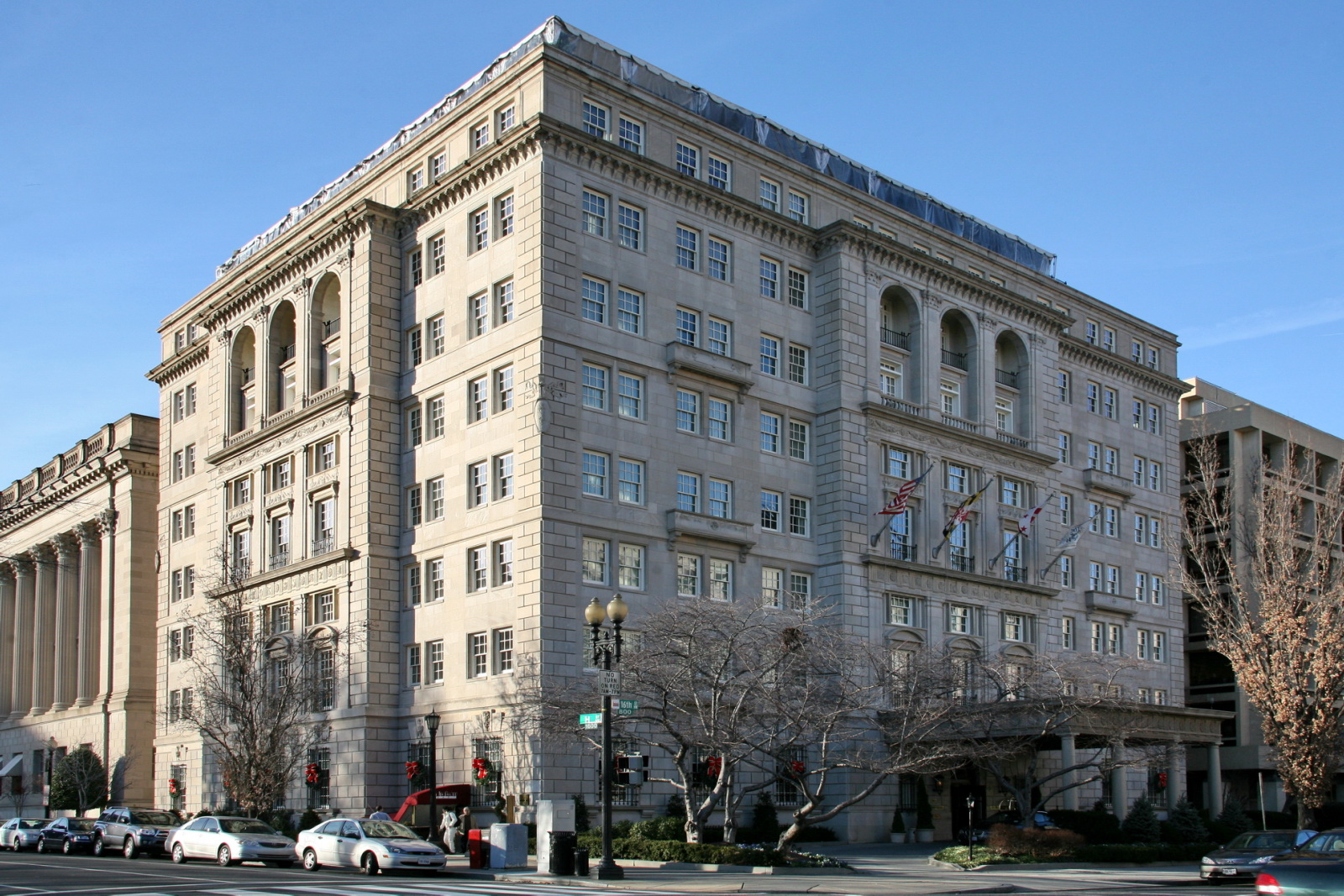
The Hay–Adams

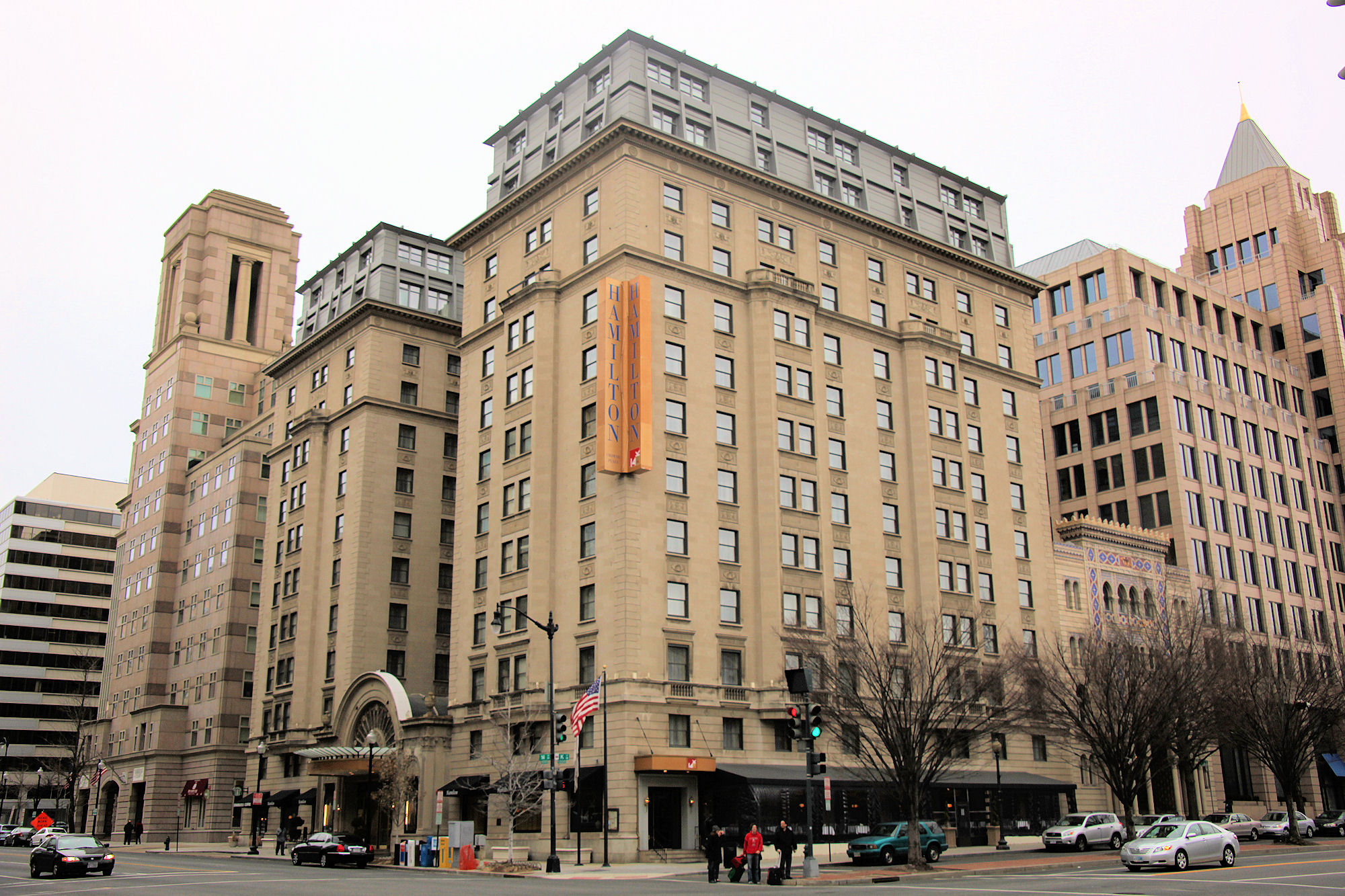
The Hamilton

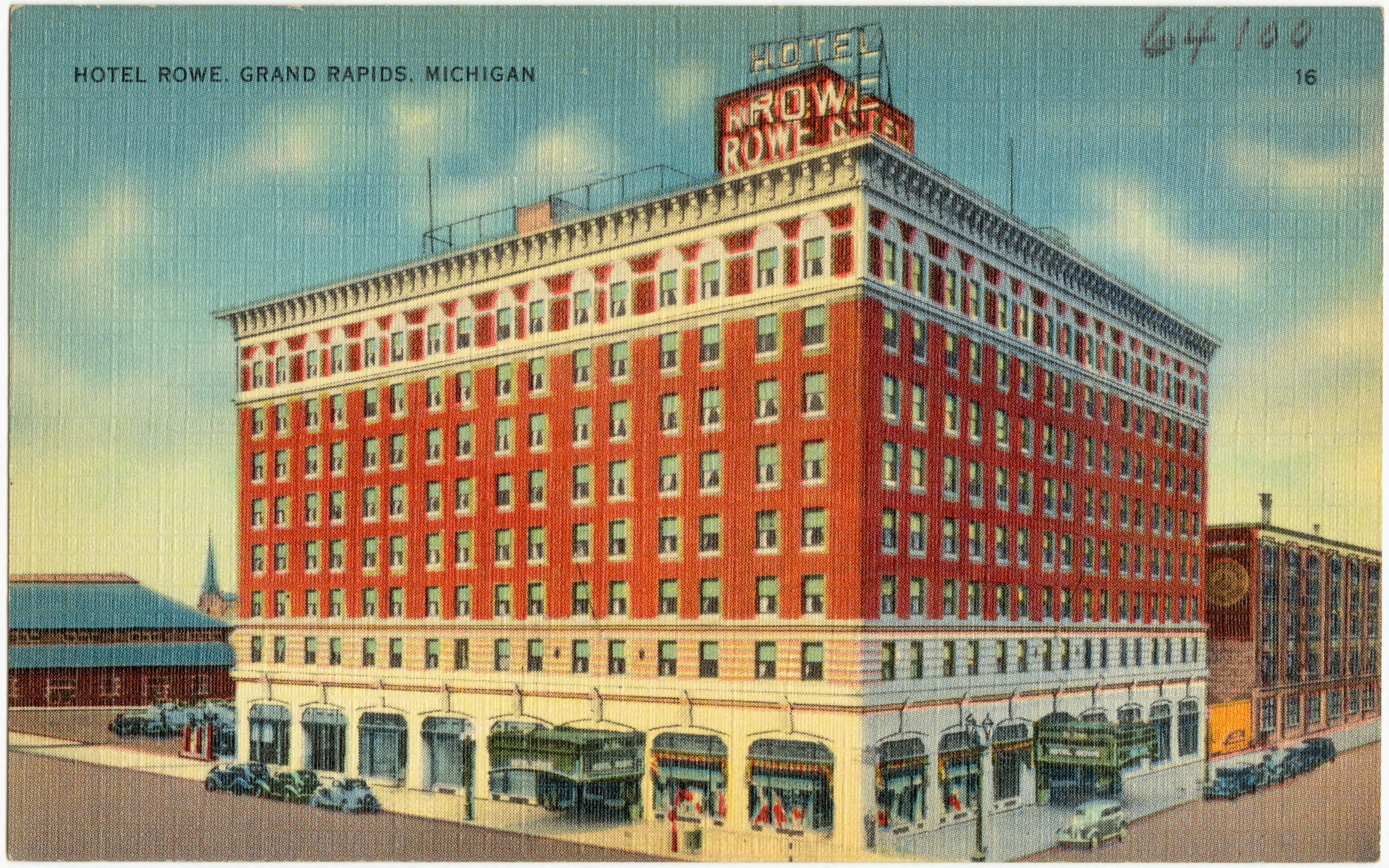
Hotel Rowe in Grand Rapids, Michigan

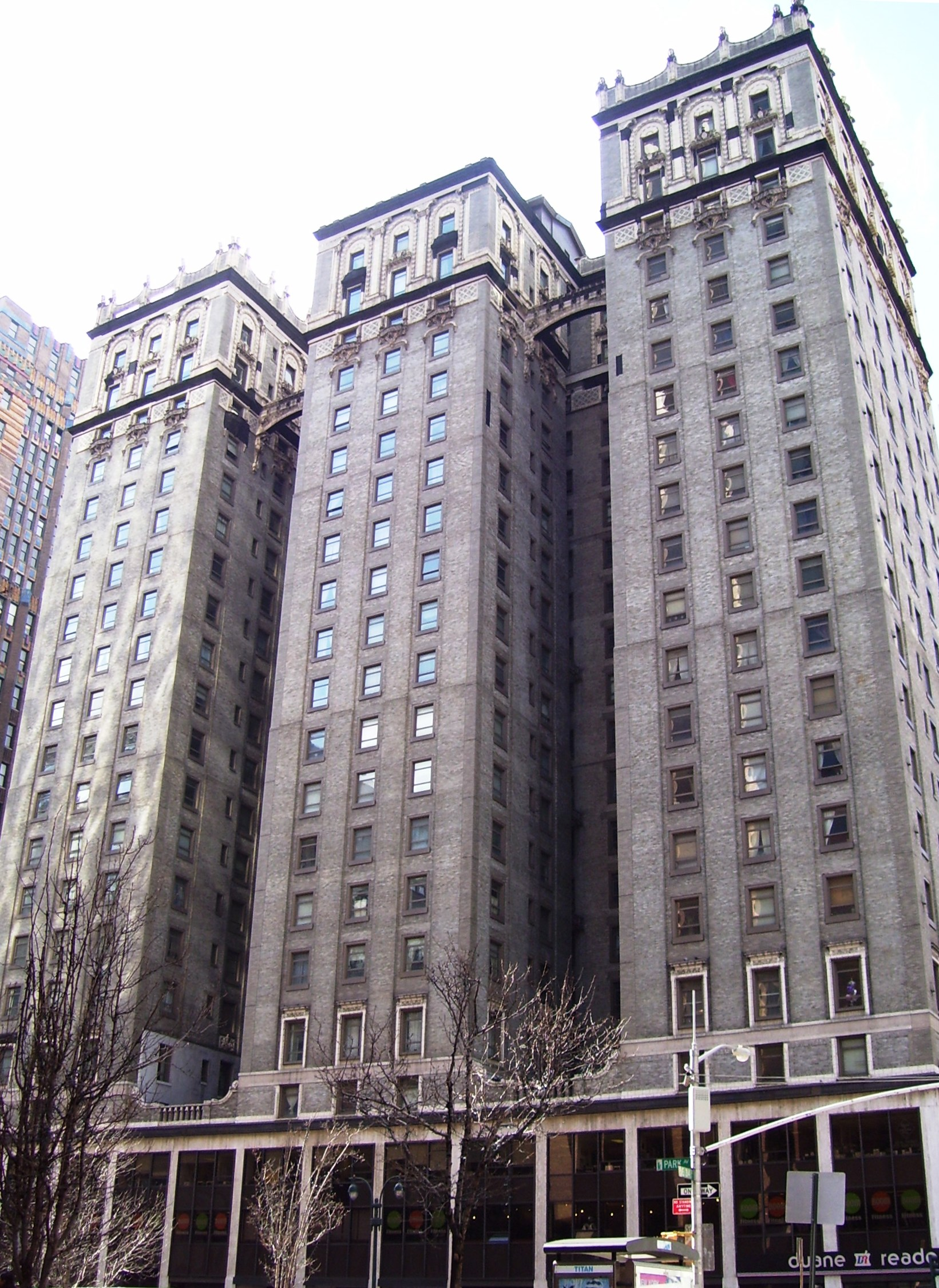
Hotel Vanderbilt, former flagship hotel of the Manger chain

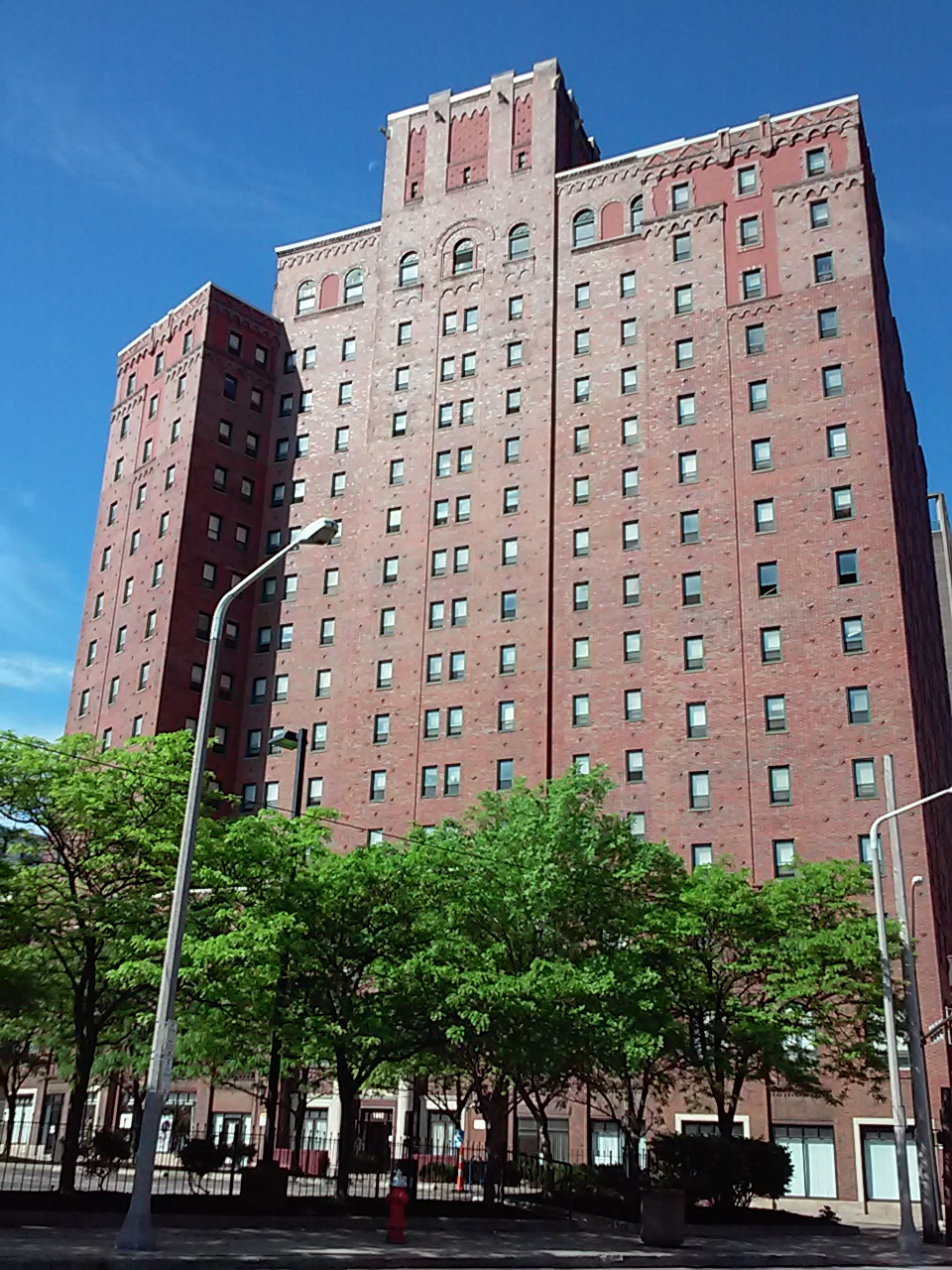
The former Allerton Hotel

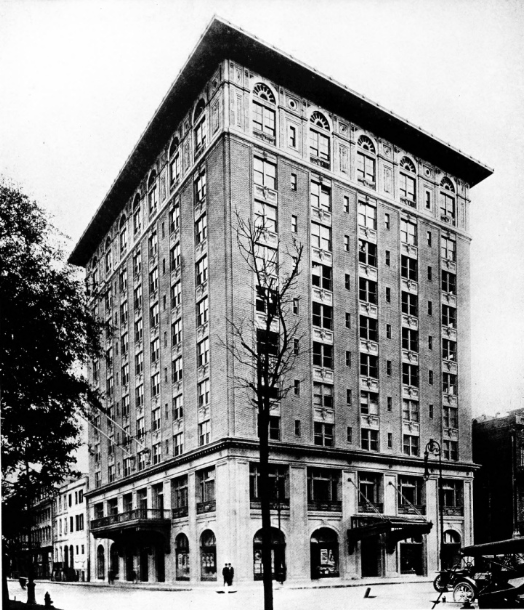
The Manger in Savannah, Georgia
