= Hotel Wolcott =

Hotel in Manhattan, New York

General information
- Architectural style: Beaux-Arts and neoclassical
- Location: 4 West 31st Street, New York, NY, 10001
- Coordinates: 40°44′48″N 73°59′12″W
- Construction started: 1902
- Opening: March 1, 1904
- Owner: Wolcott Hotel Co.
- Operator: Erlich family

Technical details
- Floor count: 12

Design and construction
- Architect: John H. Duncan
- Developer: William C. Dewey

Other information
- Number of rooms: appx. 160

Website
- Official website

New York City Landmark
- Designated: December 20, 2011
- Reference no.: 2423

The Hotel Wolcott is a hotel at 4 West 31st Street, between Fifth and Sixth Avenues, in the Midtown South neighborhood of Manhattan in New York City. Constructed between 1902 and 1904 by developer William C. Dewey, it was designed by John H. Duncan in the French Beaux-Arts and neoclassical styles. The hotel's namesake was Henry Roger Wolcott, a businessman, politician, and philanthropist. The hotel is a New York City designated landmark.

The hotel building is 12 stories tall. Its facade is largely made of red brick and limestone, with elaborate decorations. The facade is divided vertically into six bays and horizontally into a two-story base, a six-story midsection, a transitional story, and a three-story mansard roof. The hotel originally contained several ground-floor amenity areas for guests, including a neo-Grec lobby, reception room, and ballroom. The upper floors are arranged in an "H" shape and originally contained various suites and rooms, which have been rearranged over the years into 160 guestrooms.

Dewey acquired the site in 1902. The hotel opened on March 1, 1904, several months behind schedule, and Dewey had lost the Wolcott to foreclosure by that September. The Wolcott was operated by numerous individuals during the early 20th century, including William and Julius Manger of Manger Hotels during the 1920s. Over the years, it was popular with travelers, though the Wolcott also had permanent residents such as Isadora Duncan, James Buchanan Duke, Doris Duke, Edith Wharton, Mark Twain, and Henry Miller. The Wolcott had declined into a single room occupancy hotel by 1975, when the Erlich family bought it and made numerous renovations. The Wolcott was known as a budget hotel in the late 20th and early 21st centuries, then served as a temporary shelter in the 2020s.

== Site ==
The Wolcott is on the south side of 31st Street, between Broadway and Fifth Avenue, in the Midtown South neighborhood of Manhattan in New York City, at the southern edge of the Koreatown neighborhood. The land lot is nearly square and measures around 9,500 square feet (880 m^{2}), with a frontage of 97 feet (30 m) and a depth of 98.75 feet (30.10 m). The Grand Hotel is on the same block to the west, while the Wilbraham is on the same block to the south. Other nearby buildings include the Marble Collegiate Church and the old Holland House to the south, Gilsey House to the southwest, the Aberdeen Hotel (17-21 West 32nd Street) to the north, and the Colony Club building and the Church of the Transfiguration to the southeast.

During the mid-19th century, the stretch of Fifth Avenue between 23rd Street and 42nd Street contained brownstones and mansions for some of New York City's wealthiest residents, as well as churches. Many hotels and social clubs opened in what is now NoMad following the opening of the Fifth Avenue Hotel in the 1850s, followed by apartment hotels, apartment buildings, Broadway theaters, and stores in the 1870s. The area's wealthiest residents moved uptown in the 1880s, but the neighborhood remained fashionable for clubs, hotels, and apartment hotels.

== Architecture ==
The building was designed by John Hemenway Duncan, the architect of Grant's Tomb in Upper Manhattan. It is largely designed in the French Beaux-Arts style, with large decorative elements that were characteristic of that style. The structure is 12 stories high and has light courts facing east and west, giving it an "H" shape.

=== Facade ===
The Wolcott has a limestone and brick facade, with elaborate decorations. The facade is symmetrical and is divided vertically into six bays; the two center bays comprise the main entrance. It is split horizontally into a two-story base, six-story midsection, and two-story capital. Most of the original facade decorations remain intact, but most of the original wooden windows have been replaced with one-over-one metal sash windows. The northern elevation of the facade is the only side with ornamentation; the western and eastern elevations have plain brick facades with a small number of windows.

The base is clad with rusticated blocks of stone. There is an arch at the center of the double-height ground story, with a pair of metal-and-glass doors within the arch, topped by a transom window. In front of the entrance doorways is a terrace that is raised slightly above the ground, with a short stone partition wall extends from the facade on either side of the terrace. A marquee with a skylight and recessed lights is cantilevered over the main entrance, above which is an oversized cartouche and an ornate keystone. To the east (left) of the main entrance, there is a metal-and-glass door, a ramp leading to an automatic sliding door, and a service entrance. To the west (right) is a wood-and-glass door with a semicircular glass pane above, followed by two of the original sash windows. There is a recessed areaway in front of the westernmost windows. Over the years, a metal sign with the hotel's name, security cameras, and an air-conditioner have been added to the ground floor. There are windows on the second floor, topped by a cornice that separates the base and midsection.

The third through eighth stories have a pink-brick facade, with vertical stone piers and quoins, and are largely similar to one another. There are horizontal string courses above the third and eighth stories, as well as various brackets, cartouches, and other decorations above the windows. Between the third and seventh stories, the two center bays of the Wolcott's facade have oriel windows with curved glass; at the time of the hotel's construction, such windows were expensive and thus generally rare in New York City. The remaining bays have simple sash windows with copper balconettes. At the third story, the balconettes are made of stone and contain spotlights. There is another oversized cartouche between the two center bays above the eighth story, with the name "Wolcott" carved into it.

The ninth story has a stone facade and is treated as a "transitional story". On this story, the windows are recessed between pairs of large brackets that support a protruding copper cornice with giant dentils. The hotel building contains a triple-height mansard roof with copper cresting. The roof formerly had finials and other ornate details; the copper cresting was added during a later modification.

=== Features ===
From the outset, the Wolcott was intended as a fireproof building; the hotel's steel frame was built using what was known as the "Roebling system". The Wolcott also had modern mechanical systems for its time, including ice-making machines, a laundry room, a private steam plant, and a heating and ventilation system.

==== Public rooms ====
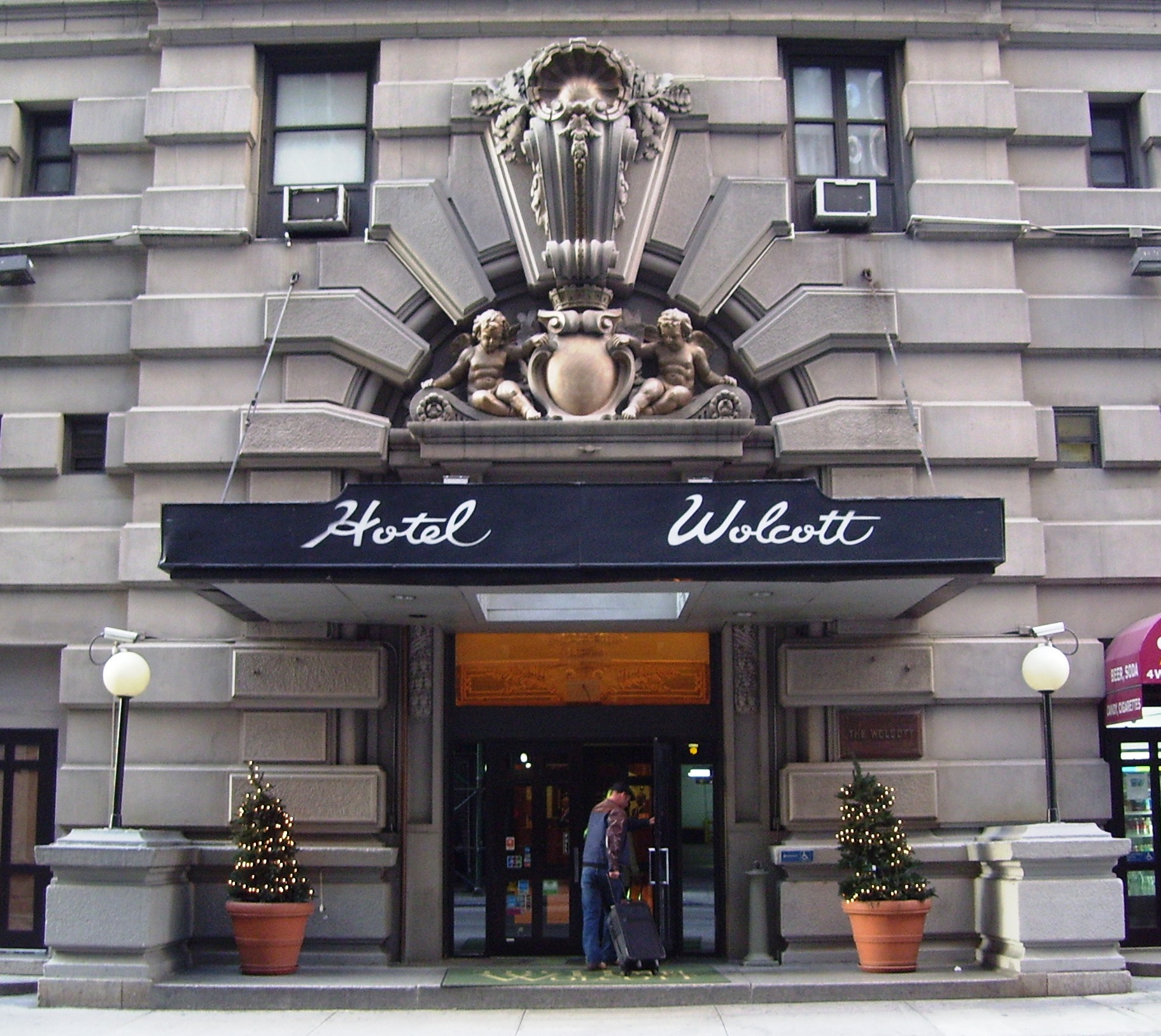
The entrance to the Hotel Wolcott

The Wolcott originally had a vestibule leading to a lobby, both designed in the Neo-Grec style. The vestibule and lobby were decorated in verde antique green, white and gold. The 20-foot (6.1 m) ceiling had elaborate moldings, as well as gold-colored brackets. Some of the marble has been replaced with wood over the years, and the ceiling has been painted to match the color of the carpet. The modern lobby is in the Louis XVI style and has marble columns and a chandelier. The lobby ends at a check-in counter.

A parlor and ladies' reception room led off the left (east) side of the vestibule, while a cafe and smoking room led off the right (west) side. The latter rooms contained a high leaded glass ceiling. To the right of the lobby was an office with green-and-white marble pilasters and counters, as well as a mosaic floor with an ornamental border and centerpiece. Near the center of the hotel, there was also a palm room to the left of the lobby and a children's dining room to the right. The palm room was a classical-style space decorated with Caen stone; the ceiling of the palm room had trellises. There was also a mezzanine level with several private dining rooms. By the 2000s, the hotel had a fitness room, business center, and a conference room, as well as a self-service laundry.

The ground story also has a ballroom covering 3,500 square feet (330 m^{2}). Originally an elaborate ballroom, it measured 100 by 50 feet (30 by 15 m) across and was designed in the Louis XVI style. The ballroom was decorated in a white, gray, and gold color scheme, with red plush hangings, and was illuminated by full-height windows on its rear wall. The decorations included Baroque-style moldings, a mosaic-tile floor, a dozen Palladian windows, a set of columns with scagliola-style plaster capitals, and a coffered ceiling. The ceiling is variously cited as measuring 20 feet (6.1 m) or 24 feet (7.3 m) high. A musicians' gallery with palms and shrubs overlooked the ballroom. The space had become a jazz club by the 1990s before being largely abandoned in the 2000s.

==== Guestrooms ====
The upper stories are arranged in an "H" shape, with a hallway connecting to a pair of emergency staircases. Two passenger elevators and a freight elevator, clustered at the center of the hotel, also served all stories. There were telephones in each room and mail chutes in the hallways.

According to a brochure published from the hotel's opening, every suite and almost every guestroom had a bathroom, and both the bedrooms and bathrooms were illuminated by natural light. The brochure also described the hotel as having many closets and full-height mirrors and windows. The closets in each bedroom have large hooks for women's dresses, which, at the time of the hotel's construction, tended to be heavy. By the 2000s, the rooms had been redecorated with striped wallpaper and "muted Federalist" designs. The modern-day hotel has about 160 or 165 units, most of which have sparse furnishings and small bathrooms. Although the rooms have air-conditioning and TVs, they do not have mini fridges or coffee machines; according to one critic, the rooms with queen-sized beds only had enough space for a nightstand, an armoire, and a small closet.

== History ==
When the Wolcott Hotel was developed at the beginning of the 20th century, many commercial structures were being developed around Herald Square. Manhattan's theater district had begun to shift northward along Broadway, from Union Square and Madison Square to Herald Square and eventually Times Square, during the first decade of the 20th century. Half a block to the east, new department store buildings were quickly being developed on Fifth Avenue. Because of growing demand for these theaters and department stores, numerous hotels were developed on Broadway between Madison Square and Times Square, a half-block to the west during the late 19th and early 20th century. The opening of Pennsylvania Station, Macy's Herald Square, and the Hudson and Manhattan Railroad's 33rd Street Terminal in the 1900s further spurred growth immediately around Herald Square. The presence of commercial structures and entertainment on Fifth Avenue and Broadway also affected development on side streets, where hotels and clubs were built to replace private residences.

=== Development and opening ===
The Alvord family sold three land lots on 31st Street in February 1902 to New York Realty Corporation, which then resold them to William C. Dewey. Prior to Dewey's purchase, the Alvord family had owned the site for a half-century, and the lots had included a three-story house and a horse stable. Dewey indicated that he would build a 12-story hotel about 100 ft (30 m) west of Fifth Avenue, and he hired Duncan to design the hotel, which was to cost $500,000. The George F. Balmer Construction Company began excavating the site in June 1902, and A. L. Goldschmidt was hired that September to install the electrical equipment. James Breslin, the longtime operator of the nearby Gilsey House hotel, leased the building in March 1903, paying more than $2 million over 21 years. By then, the hotel had been named after businessman and politician Henry Roger Wolcott, a brother of U.S. senator Edward O. Wolcott and a descendant of U.S. founding father Oliver Wolcott.

The Wolcott's construction was delayed by several months because Dewey had to import structural steel from Europe, having encountered issues in acquiring the steel domestically. Furthermore, as a result of labor strikes, the hotel could not open in November 1903, as was originally scheduled. The Wolcott opened on March 1, 1904, with J. H. Woods as its first manager. At the time of the Wolcott's opening, guests paid $3 per night for guestrooms with bathrooms and $8 per night for guestrooms with a parlor and bathrooms. The hotel had its own restaurant, which, according to a contemporary brochure, served "little chicken that come unplucked from the Jersey farms" and Cape Cod oysters. In addition, the hotel hired porters to carry bags from nearby train stations, as well as a valet and a "ladies' maid".

=== 1900s to 1960s ===
Because of the atypically long time that it had taken to construct the Wolcott, Dewey was unable to make payments on his mortgage. At the end of September 1904, the American Mortgage Company foreclosed on a $391,000 mortgage that it had placed on the hotel, and G. Thornton Warren was appointed as the Wolcott's receiver. A state judge ordered in January 1905 that the Wolcott be sold. After the Wolcott was sold, Breslin maintained his lease of the hotel until his death in early 1906, and his estate held the hotel's lease for another two years. George T. Stockham bought the hotel's lease in May 1908 and retained most of its staff, operating the hotel for ten years. After Stockham took over the Wolcott, the hotel began offering additional amenities for dog owners. The Wolcott Realty Company acquired the hotel in 1912. William and Julius Manger of Manger Hotels bought the Wolcott in February 1923, and their subsidiary Wolcott Operating Corporation owned it for nine years.

In the Wolcott's early years, it was popular with travelers, although it also rented rooms to permanent residents. Among the Wolcott's most famous residents were dancer Isadora Duncan, tobacco magnate James Buchanan Duke, heiress Doris Duke, writers Edith Wharton and Mark Twain, and theatrical producer Henry Miller. The writer Francis Trevelyan Miller also stayed at the Wolcott, suing the hotel's managers in 1930 after he allegedly got electrocuted while trying to plug in a lamp. The hotel also hosted events such as American League baseball meetings; at one such meeting in 1914, the New York Yankees were sold to Jacob Ruppert and Tillinghast Huston. The Commission Resident Buyers' Association of America opened a clubhouse on the Wolcott's mezzanine in 1928, using the main ballroom and the private dining rooms for meetings.

In October 1932, the Wolcott Operating Company sold the hotel to Wolcott Inc., headed by Hyman Portnof, at which point the hotel was valued at $600,000. The new owners planned to overhaul the interior for about $100,000. The hotel continued to host events such as Fiorello La Guardia's inauguration ball in 1938. The Office of Price Administration, an agency of the U.S. government, accused the Wolcott's operators of overcharging rent in 1944; the case was settled the next year, when the operators agreed to refund tenants' rent and pay damages. Architect Samuel A. Hertz filed plans for $8,000 worth of alterations in 1947. The Wolcott also hosted the Beltone Studios, a recording studio, during the 1950s and 1960s. Among the musicians who stayed at the Wolcott while recording at Beltone Studios were Buddy Holly and the Everly Brothers.

=== 1970s to present ===
The Erlich family paid $650,000 for the building in 1975, at which point it had declined into a single room occupancy hotel. Scientologists such as Kate Bornstein rented rooms there during this timeframe, with the penthouse's condition described as being "the corrugated tin shack on the roof", and they did not tell hotel management about their affiliation with Scientology. Scott Erlich took over as the hotel's manager around 1989. The Wolcott's occupancy rate increased by about 5 percent per year for the next five years; some of the increase in occupancy came from European tourists who learned of the hotel through travel publications. The lobby was renovated in 1992, when the Tiffany glass window and other details were restored. A jazz club called the Five Spot opened at the hotel in February 1993, within the hotel's ballroom. The club hosted musicians such as David Sanborn and McCoy Tyner until it closed in 1996. By the late 1990s and early 2000s, the Wolcott operated as a budget hotel; it did not offer any room service.

The New York City Landmarks Preservation Commission designated the Wolcott as a city landmark in 2011. The building's owners decided to renovate the ballroom in 2014 after completing a five-year renovation of the guest rooms. At the time, the ballroom was mostly empty and used as storage space, although it sometimes held photo shoots for celebrities such as actresses Jennifer Lawrence and Amanda Seyfried.

Under a contract with nonprofit organization Exodus Transitional Communities, in March 2020, the hotel became a shelter for homeless former prisoners during the COVID-19 pandemic. The hotel was almost entirely staffed by formerly incarcerated people. After local news website thecity.nyc reported in 2022 that Exodus Transitional Communities had hired an unlicensed security contractor at another shelter that it operated, Exodus closed the Hotel Wolcott shelter that October. The next month, New York City mayor Eric Adams announced that he would open a temporary 175-room shelter for asylum seekers at the Wolcott, amid an increase in the number of people within the city who sought asylum in the United States. The city government also paid a contractor to cook Latin American food for the hotel's occupants.

== Critical reception ==
A writer for The New York Times wrote in 1980 that the Wolcott's design "show[s] the romantic extravagance once lavished on city hostelries". Another critic for the same paper wrote in 2000: "Walking into the giddy, ornate plaster-and-marble ornamented lobby [...] I fooled myself for an instant, thinking that I'd returned to the elegant New York of 1910." In 2014, Lana Bortolot of The Wall Street Journal wrote of the Wolcott that "Its distinctive pink-brick facade, limestone frills and copper mansard roof gave it standing among other luxury hotels of its time". Christopher Gray wrote that Duncan's design "combines his blocky, brusque stonework with a veritable galleon of copper cresting along the three-story-high mansard".

Reviews of the service were mixed. The Los Angeles Times wrote in 1998 that the Wolcott was "old-fashioned but well maintained, and especially popular with Europeans". Similarly, The Daily Telegraph called the Wolcott a "faded hotel with a shabby-grand lobby and cramped rooms". A Chicago Tribune critic praised "the lobby's elaborate, turn-of-the-century decorative ceiling" and the quietness of the rooms in the rear, although the critic described the rooms as somewhat expensive and claimed to have found an empty condom wrapper on the floor.

== See also ==
- List of New York City Designated Landmarks in Manhattan from 14th to 59th Streets
- National Register of Historic Places listings in Manhattan from 14th to 59th Streets
