= Thomas P. O'Neill Jr. Federal Building (Boston) =

Federal government building in Boston, Massachusetts

Coordinates: 42.36515°N 71.06309°W

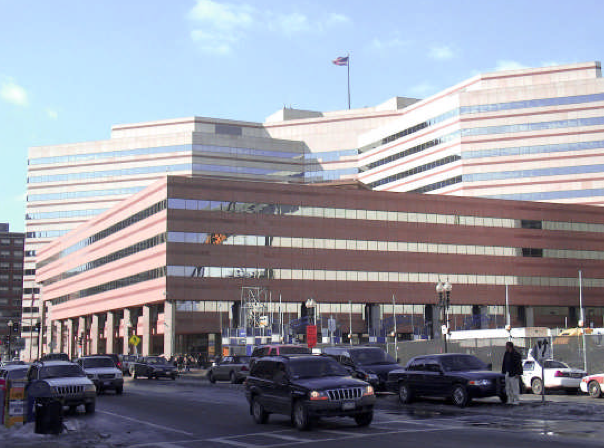
Tip O'Neill building, Boston

The Thomas P. "Tip" O'Neill Federal Building is an administrative center of the U.S. federal government in Boston, Massachusetts. Named for former Massachusetts congressman and Speaker of the House of Representatives Tip O'Neill, the building houses the New England regional offices of numerous federal agencies, e.g. the Social Security Administration, the Peace Corps, Boston Passport Agency, etc. It is located at 10 Causeway Street.

== History ==
Built in 1986, the building is named after Thomas Phillip "Tip" O'Neill Jr. (1912–1994), Speaker of the House of Representatives from 1977 to 1987. It was built on the site of the former Hotel Manger.

== Tenants ==
- Department of Agriculture; APHIS/PPQ; Food & Nutrition Service
- Department of Commerce; Export Enforcement
- Department of Homeland Security; Office of the Inspector General; U.S. Secret Service; U.S. Homeland Security Investigations, U.S. Customs & Border Protection
- Department of Housing & Urban Development
- Department of Justice; Bureau of Alcohol, Tobacco, Firearms & Explosives
- Department of Labor; Office of Administrative Law Judges
- Department of State; U.S. Passport Agency, Diplomatic Security
- Department of the Treasury; Internal Revenue Service
- Federal Labor Relations Authority
- General Services Administration
- Government Accountability Office
- Hanscom Federal Credit Union
- National Labor Relations Board
- Small Business Administration
- Social Security Administration
- Defense Contract Management Agency
- Federal Protective Services
- Census Bureau

== Architecture ==
Built mainly of pink granite, the Thomas P. O'Neill Jr. Federal Building is characterized by intersecting triangular and chamfered-cornered rectangular sections, horizontal ribbon windows, a sheltered entry loggia off Causeway Street, a sequence of round bollards placed along its front elevation to deter traffic and truck bombers, and a large glass atrium that pours sunlight into its center concourse. In 2000 and 2005, the Environmental Protection Agency awarded the structure the Energy Star for its white reflective roofing system, installed to reduce the urban heat island effect, as well as its use of low-VOC (volatile organic compound) paints and recycled-content ceiling tiles and metal studs.

== Art installations ==
Since October 1986, the building has displayed Jane Kaufman's “Crystal Hanging," a cascade of 9,000 glass crystals measuring 26 feet (7.9 m) high and 16 feet (4.9 m) across, in its atrium, as well as Mary Miss' "Cascading Wall Fountain," an abstract sculpture of dried twigs, plywood and painted cardboard.

== Image gallery ==
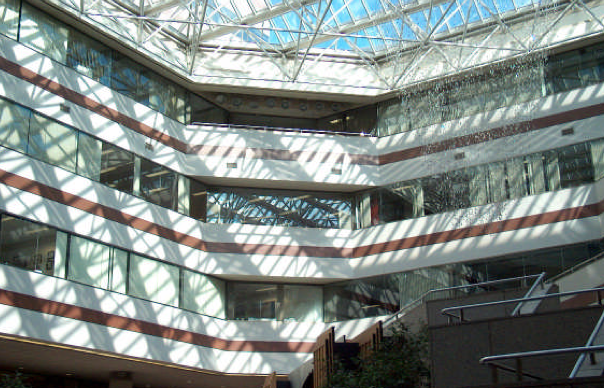
Interior, O'Neill building

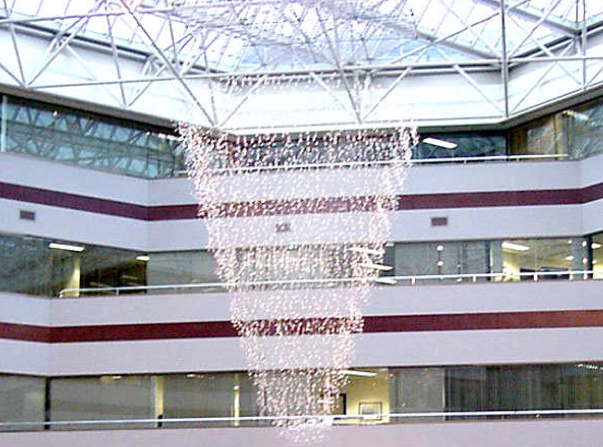
Jane Kaufman's "Crystal Hanging," interior, O'Neill building

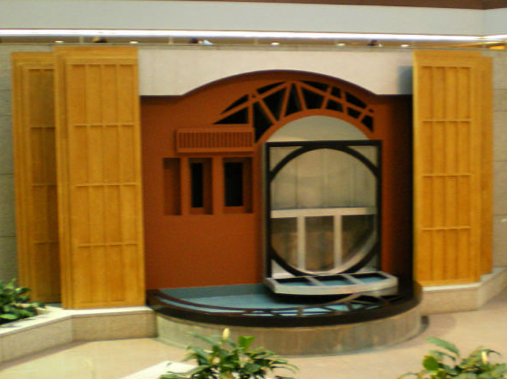
Mary Miss' "Cascading Wall Fountain," interior, O'Neill building
