= Russell N. Cox =

American businessperson

Member of the New Hampshire House of Representatives from the Rockingham 24th District
- In office 1998–2002
- Preceded by: John J. McCarthy
- Succeeded by: Daniel M. Hughes

Personal details
- Born: December 24, 1926 Newton, Massachusetts
- Died: October 20, 2017 (aged 90) New Castle, New Hampshire
- Party: Republican
- Education: Massachusetts Institute of Technology; Harvard Business School
- Occupation: Real estate developer

Russell Nye Cox (December 24, 1926 – October 20, 2017) was an American real-estate developer who owned the Boston Garden and developed industrial parks in Greater Boston. He later moved to New Hampshire and served two terms in the New Hampshire House of Representatives.

== Early life ==
Cox was born on December 24, 1926, to John E. Cox and Mary (Hoyt) Cox. His father was the owner of a wholesale confectionery distribution company. Cox graduated from the Massachusetts Institute of Technology and Harvard Business School. In 1953 he married Sally Stewart of Utica, New York.

== Business career ==
In 1953, Cox joined the firm of Cabot, Cabot & Forbes. In 1960 he was promoted to vice president and general member of the real estate division. In 1962 he formed Linnell and Cox with fellow Cabot, Cabot & Forbes vice president Robert C. Linnell.

In 1963 Linnell and Cox purchased the Hotel Madison, North Station Industrial Building, and about 17 acres of land behind North Station from the Boston and Maine Railroad. They soon sold the hotel to Dison Corp. for a reported $2 million amid threats that the city would take over the property because of tax defaults. In 1965 they purchased the remainder of B&M's North Station properties, which included the Boston Garden. In 1973 the Garden was sold to the Boston Garden-Arena Corporation for $4 million. Linnell and Cox also developed a number of industrial parks along Route 128. Cox later served as president of General Investment and Development and Resort Management Inc.

== Politics ==
From 1998 to 2002 Cox represented the Rockingham 24th district in the New Hampshire House of Representatives.

== Death ==
Cox died on October 20, 2017, in New Castle, New Hampshire. He was predeceased by his second wife, Susanna, and one of his four daughters.
