= Sheldon Fairbanks =

American exposition promoter (1893–1969)

Sheldon Hughes Fairbanks (September 29, 1893 - April 25, 1969) was an American exposition promoter and the first general manager of the Boston Garden.

== Early life ==
Fairbanks was born on September 29, 1893, in Roxbury, Boston and attended Dorchester High School, where he was a noted athlete.

== Journalism ==
By the age of 20 he was the New England manager of the United Press Associations - the youngest press association manager in the country. Two years later he became the managing editor of the Akron Press. Fairbanks then served as city editor of the Cleveland Press and later as the news editor of The Detroit News. He left Detroit during World War I to enter the first officers' training camp at Fort Sheridan. After the War he worked for the North American Newspaper Alliance. In 1923, Fairbanks went on special assignment aboard the Bowdoin to accompany Donald Baxter MacMillan on an Arctic exhibition.

== Radio ==
In the spring of 1922, Fairbanks staged the world's first commercial radio exposition. Beginning in 1927, the Boston Radio Exposition was combined with the newly-formed New England Aero Show. Fairbanks also staged the first commercial radio expositions in New York City and Chicago, served as executive director of the Rhode Island Radio and Aero Show, the Hartford Home Progress Exposition, Norwich Progress Exposition, the Haverhill Pageant of Progress, and the Sportsmen's Show in Boston, Indianapolis, Detroit, and Chicago. He also served an advisory director for a number of exhibitions held in New York City's Grand Central Palace.

Fairbanks purchased the business of fellow promoter Chester I. Campbell following Campbell's death in 1933. This gave Fairbanks the opportunity to arrange boating, automobile, sporting, and electrical expositions across the country.

== Boston Garden ==
On June 6, 1928, Fairbanks was appointed the first general manager of the Boston Garden. He resigned as general manager in 1930 due to his myriad other business responsibilities, but remained on the Boston Garden board of directors until the late 1950s.

== Thoroughbred and greyhound racing ==
In 1933, Fairbanks began racing thoroughbred horses. One of his horses, Gold Step, was nicknamed "the inaugural horse" for winning many opening day purses at tracks throughout the country.

Fairbanks was also involved with greyhound racing. He was the vice president and general manager of Wonderland Greyhound Park in Revere, Massachusetts.

== Football ==
In 1940, Fairbanks ran the Boston Bears of the American Football League. The team folded prior to the 1941 season.

== Later life ==
Fairbanks retired in 1954. In his later years, Fairbanks spent much of his time traveling and attended many sporting shows. He died on April 25, 1969, at Milton Hospital. At the time of his death, Fairbanks was residing in Milton, Massachusetts.
