= Eddie Casey =

American football player and coach (1894–1966)

Biographical details
- Born: May 16, 1894; Natick, Massachusetts, U.S.
- Died: July 26, 1966 (aged 72); Boston, Massachusetts, U.S.

Playing career
- 1916: Harvard
- 1917: Charlestown Navy Yard
- 1919: Harvard
- 1920: Buffalo All-Americans
- Position: Halfback

Coaching career (HC unless noted)
- 1920–1921: Mount Union
- 1922–1925: Tufts
- 1926–1928: Harvard (freshmen)
- 1929–1930: Harvard (backfield)
- 1931–1934: Harvard
- 1935: Boston Redskins
- 1940: Boston Bears

Head coaching record
- Overall: 42–36–4 (college); 2–8–1 (NFL); 5–4–1 (AFL)

Accomplishments and honors

Awards
- Consensus All-American (1919; Second-team All-American (1916); First-team All-Service (1917)
- College Football Hall of Fame; Inducted in 1968 (profile)

Edward Lawrence Casey (May 16, 1894 – July 26, 1966) was an American football player and coach. He played college football at Harvard University and was inducted to the College Football Hall of Fame in 1968. Casey was MVP of the 1920 Rose Bowl Game in which Harvard defeated Oregon 7-6. In recognition of his Rose Bowl accomplishments, Casey was inducted into the Rose Bowl Hall of Fame in 2019. Casey also played professional football in 1920 for the Buffalo All-Americans; he was also the head coach of the Boston Redskins of the National Football League (NFL) in 1935 and the Boston Bears of the third American Football League (AFL) in 1940.

== Early life ==
Casey was born in Natick, Massachusetts, on May 16, 1894, to James Francis and Ellen (Ahern) Casey. He attended Phillips Exeter Academy where he graduated in 1915.

== College coaching career ==
Casey started his football coaching career in 1920 at Mount Union College in Alliance, Ohio. In 1922, he moved on to Tufts College in Medford, Massachusetts, where he coached until 1925. That year, he moved on to Harvard University. He was the Harvard freshmen coach from 1926 to 1928, the backfield coach from 1929 to 1930 and head coach from 1931 to 1934.

== Head coaching record ==
=== College ===
Year	Team	Overall	Conference	Standing	Bowl/playoffs
Mount Union Purple (Ohio Athletic Conference) (1920–1921)
1920	Mount Union	6–3	3–3	T–9th	
1921	Mount Union	1–6–1	0–5–1	17th	
Mount Union:		7–9–1	3–8–1		
Tufts Jumbos (Independent) (1922–1925)
1922	Tufts	5–4			
1923	Tufts	6–2			
1924	Tufts	3–4–2			
1925	Tufts	1–6			
Tufts:		15–16–2			
Harvard Crimson (Independent) (1931–1934)
1931	Harvard	7–1			
1932	Harvard	5–3			
1933	Harvard	5–2–1			
1934	Harvard	3–5			
Harvard:		20–11–1			
Total:		42–36–4			

=== Professional ===
Team	Year	Regular season					Postseason			
Team	Year	Won	Lost	Ties	Win %	Finish	Won	Lost	Win %	Result
BOS	1935	2	8	1	.227	4th in NFL Eastern	–	–	–	–
BOS/NFL Total		2	8	1	.227		–	–	–	
BSB	1940	5	4	1	.550	3rd in AFL	–	–	–	–
BSB/AFL Total		5	4	1	.550		–	–	–	
Total		7	12	1	.375		–	–	–	
