= Hotel Manger =

Former hotel in Boston, Massachusetts

The Hotel Manger, Hotel Madison
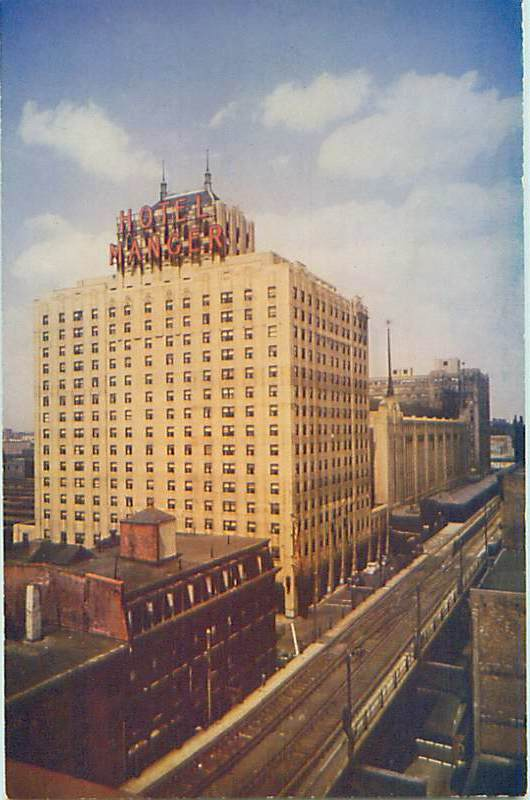
- Hotel Manger in the 1950s
- Hotel chain: Manger (1930–1958)

General information
- Location: Boston, Massachusetts
- Coordinates: 42.3658°N 71.0611°W
- Opening: August 30, 1930
- Closed: October 30, 1976
- Demolished: May 15, 1983
- Cost: $2.8 million
- Owner: Manger Hotels & Boston & Maine Railroad (1930–1958); Boston & Maine Railroad (1958–1963); Linnell & Cox (1963–1963); Dison Corp. (1963–1983); Boston Redevelopment Authority (1983–1983)

Technical details
- Floor count: 17

Design and construction
- Architects: Funk & Wilcox

Other information
- Number of rooms: 500

The Hotel Manger (pronounced Mang-er as in hangar), renamed the Hotel Madison in 1959, was a hotel in Boston, Massachusetts, United States, which operated from 1930 to 1976. It was attached to North Station and the Boston Garden. In 1983, the building was demolished to make way for the Thomas P. O'Neill Jr. Federal Building.

== Development ==
On November 15, 1927, Homer Loring, chairman of the Boston & Maine Railroad, announced that plans had been finalized for the construction of a new North Station facility, which would include a sports arena, hotel, office building, and distributing terminal. On July 15, 1929, Manger Hotels and the Boston & Maine Railroad announced that the two parties had signed a contract for the construction of the hotel. B&M and Manger would each hold 50% of the stock in the building company, and the hotel would be leased to a company owned by Julius Manger. The cost of the building was to be $2.8 million.

== Opening ==
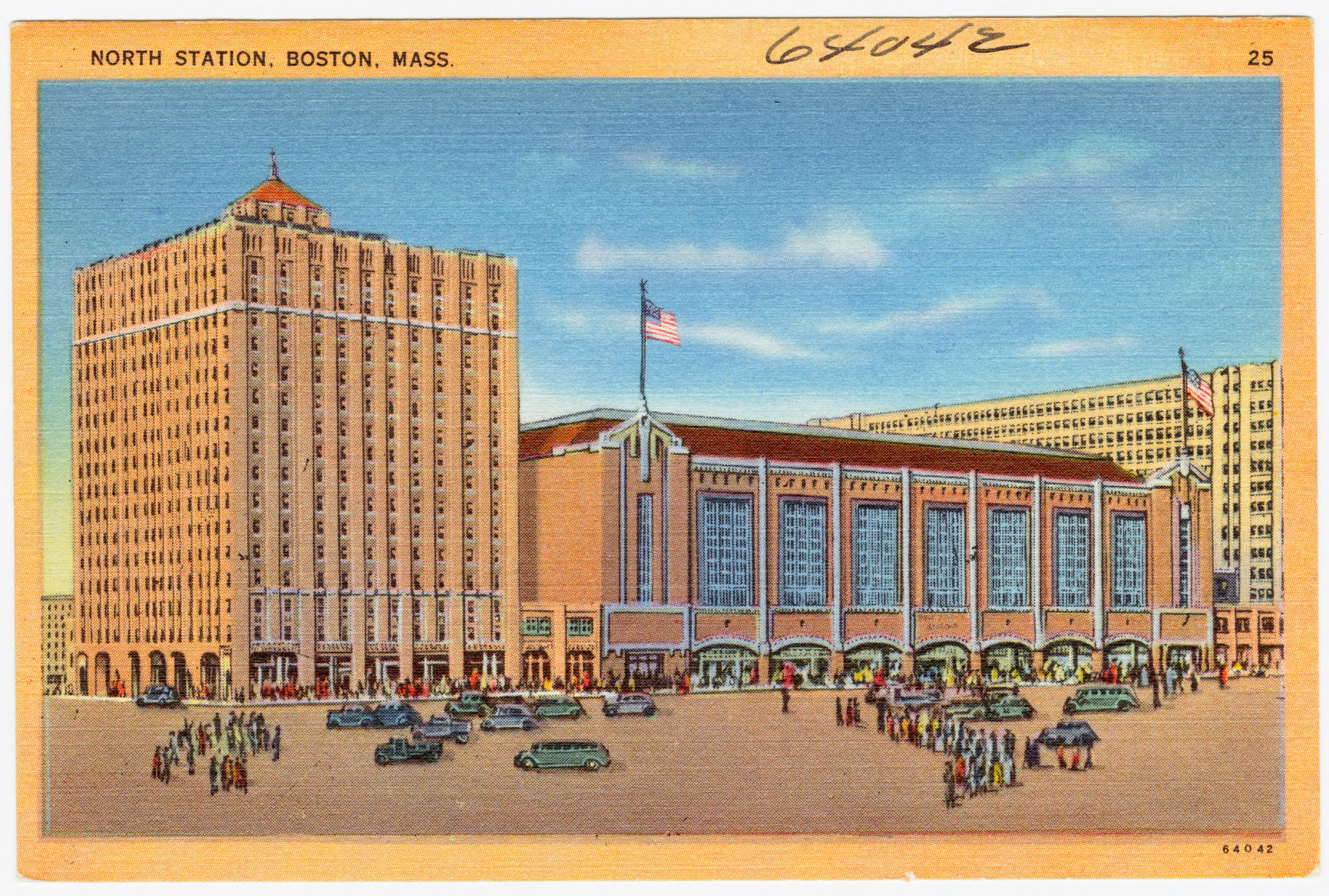
Postcard of the hotel, circa 1930–1945. The Causeway Street elevated is not shown.

The Hotel Manger opened to the public on August 30, 1930. It was the fifteenth hotel opened by the Manger chain, which also owned hotels in New York City and Chicago. The 17-story hotel contained 500 rooms, a restaurant, private dining rooms, oyster bar, banquet hall/ballroom, barber shop, and beauty salon. At the time of its opening, the Hotel Manger had proportionately more marble than any other building in New England. The top floors offered views of the Charles River, Bunker Hill Monument, and Boston Harbor. The hotel had direct access to the Boston Garden and North Station. George L. Bowles was the hotel's first manager.

The hotel was formally opened on September 27, 1930. The reception was attended by over 200 guests, including Mayor James Michael Curley, Secretary of the Commonwealth Frederic W. Cook, and U.S. Representative John McCormack. Former Boston fire commissioner Theodore A. Glynn was the toastmaster for the event.

From 1934 to 1936, radio station WMEX had its studio in the Hotel Manger.

== Notable guests and incidents ==
Throughout its early years, acts that were performing at the Boston Garden, including Arthur Godfrey, Paul Whiteman, Gene Autry, and Roy Rogers, stayed at the Hotel Manger. Visiting hockey and basketball teams playing at the Garden stayed at the hotel until they switched from rail to air travel. Track athletes participating at the BAA Meet, including Glenn Cunningham, Harrison Dillard, Charles Beetham, and Ralph Boston, also stayed at the Manger.

On July 29, 1932, the Boston Police Department arrested 26 men they believed were involved in the pool and lottery racket. 25 of the 26 men were also charged with suspicion of knowledge of murder. On March 13, 1935, the body of Sturgis H. Hunt, a Quincy, Massachusetts political figure who was a "missing witness" in the removal proceedings against Mayor Charles A. Ross, was found by a chambermaid. Hunt had committed suicide by drinking poison.

On April 5, 1947, at the Boston Bruins annual breakup party, Bill Cowley unexpectedly announced he was leaving hockey because general manager Art Ross left him off of the roster for a post-season exhibition tour of Western Canada and the United States (Cowley's wife was from Vancouver and he wanted to use the trip as a honeymoon). At the time of his retirement, Cowley was the NHL's all-time leading point scorer. On May 14, 1970, Bruins head coach Harry Sinden held a press conference at the hotel to announce he was leaving hockey to enter private business. His announcement came four days after the Bruins defeated the St. Louis Blues in the 1970 Stanley Cup Finals.

On October 25, 1949, the body of Leon G. Whittemore, head of a local chemical company, was found in a third-floor restroom. The medical examiner ruled that Whittemore's death was a suicide by poisoning. On April 1, 1950, the literary scholar F. O. Matthiessen committed suicide by jumping out of a 12th floor window.

On October 21, 1951, groundwork on the Central Artery resulted in the hotel losing its steam supply. The hotel used a steam locomotive to heat the hotel until service was restored. On September 19, 1953, boxing trainer and manager Ray Arcel was critically injured in front of the hotel when he was hit from behind by an assailant wielding a lead pipe. The attack was a warning from the mob, who did not want Arcel to organize a competing television broadcast. The attack was never solved and Arcel remained out of boxing until 1972, when he came out of retirement to train Roberto Durán.

On September 12, 1964, The Beatles stayed at the hotel and held a press conference there.

== Ownership changes ==
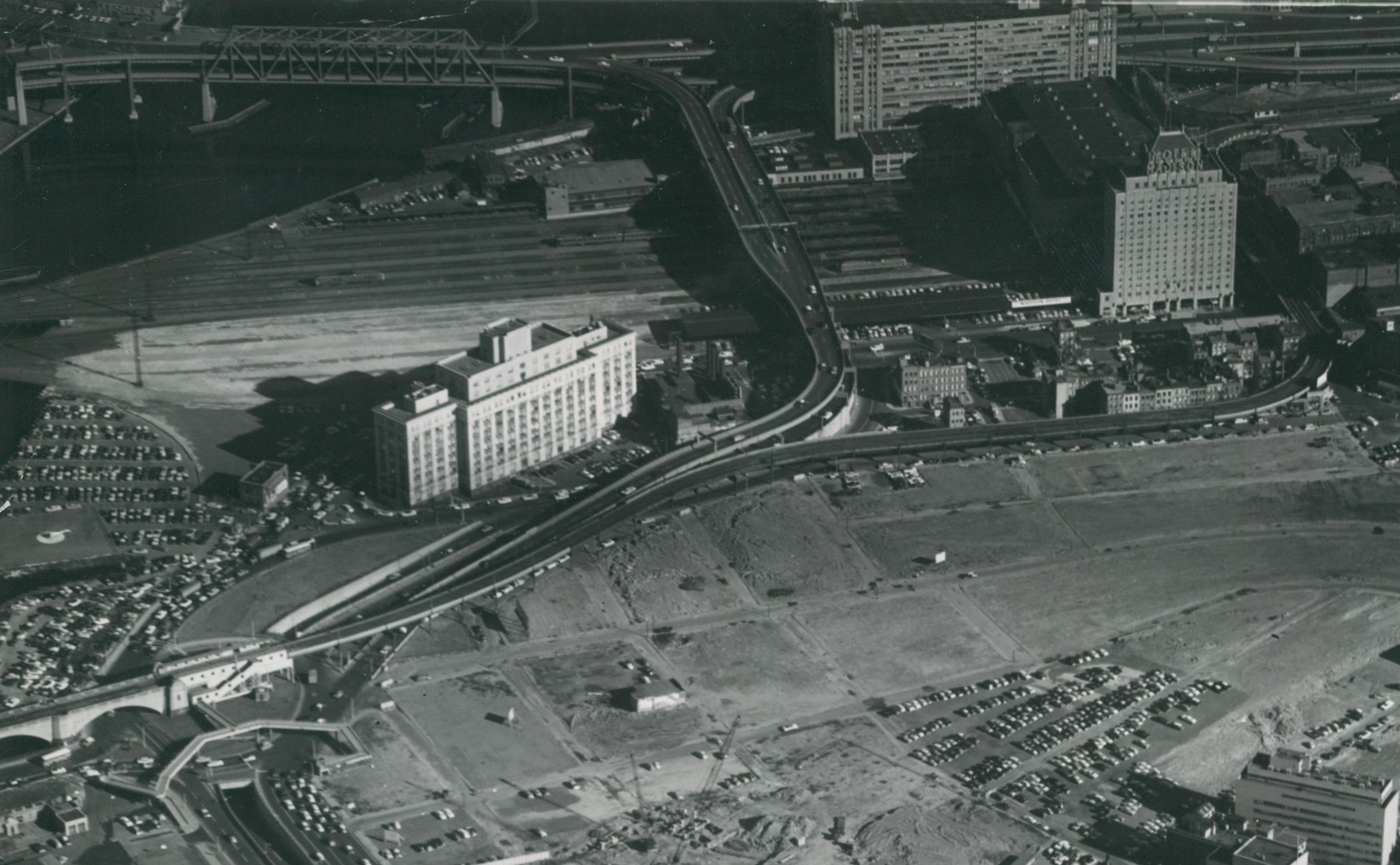
The cleared West End around 1960, with Hotel Madison at right

In 1958, the Boston and Maine Railroad began negotiations to purchase full ownership of the hotel. The purchase was announced on January 30, 1959. The hotel was renamed as the Hotel Madison by B&M. Julius Manger Jr. stated that the reason for the sale was the company's desire to focus on its motel operations.

In July 1963, B&M sold the hotel, the North Station Industrial Building, and about 17 acres of land behind North Station to Linnell & Cox. Linnell & Cox soon sold the hotel to Dison Corp. for a reported $2 million amid threats that the city would take over the property because of tax defaults.

== Closure and demolition ==
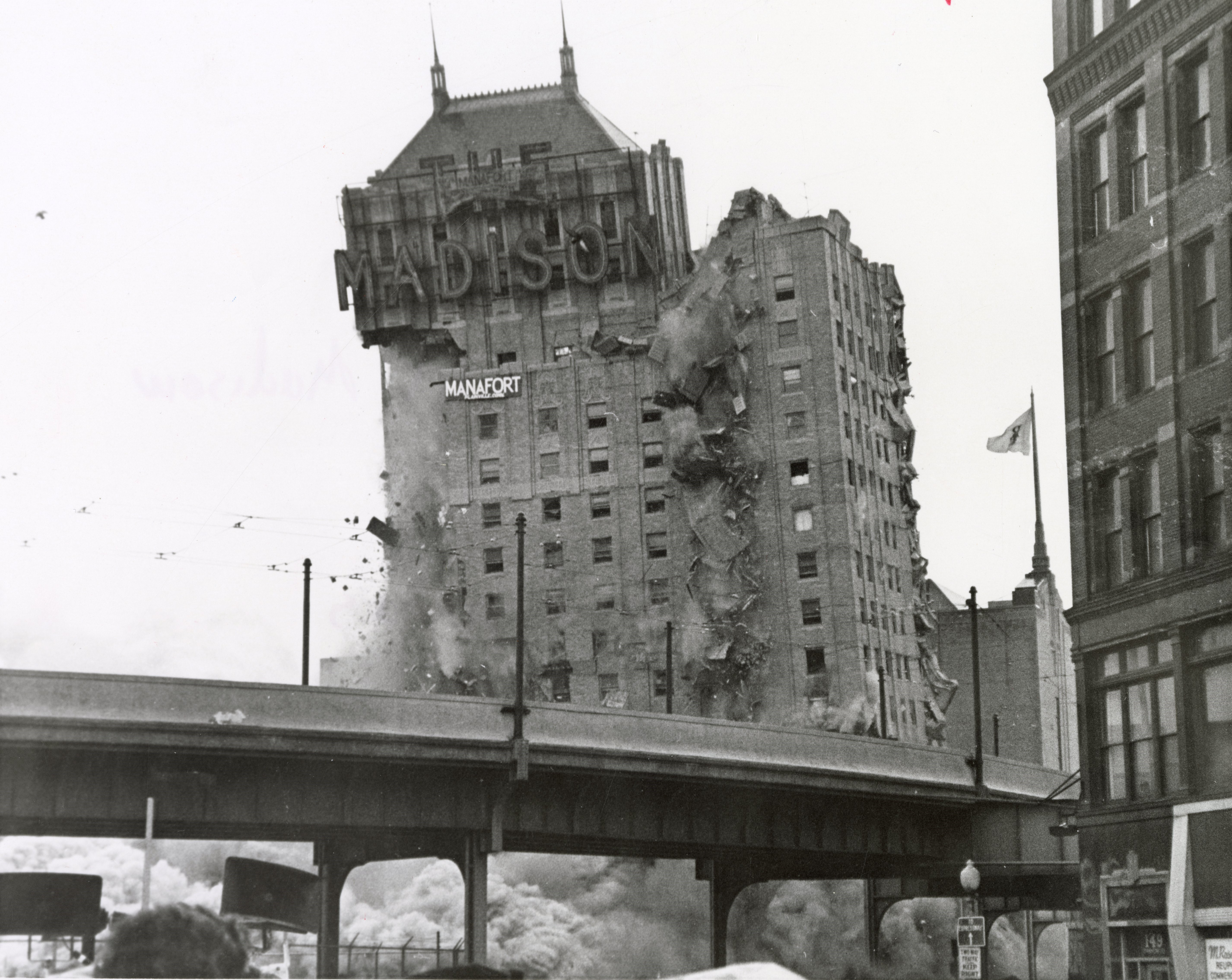
Demolition in 1983

As railroad traffic declined, the neighborhood surrounding North Station lost its importance as a commuter center and the hotel began to suffer financially. In 1973, Dison petitioned to convert the hotel into an elderly housing complex. The Boston Housing Authority supported the proposal and worked to get federal funding. The BHA also considered moving its headquarters to the hotel if the project was completed. However, plans for the housing development fell through. On October 21, 1976, it was announced that due to financial problems, the hotel would close on October 30.

In March 1983, the Boston Redevelopment Authority purchased the hotel from the MSL Reality Trust for $2.2 million. On May 15, 1983, the hotel was demolished by explosives. An estimated 26,000 people observed the implosion, which was also televised live by WNEV. The hotel was demolished in order to make way for the construction of the Thomas P. O'Neill Jr. Federal Building.
