= Boston Bears (AFL) =

General information
- Founded: 1940
- Folded: 1940
- Stadium: Fenway Park
- Headquartered: Boston, Massachusetts, United States
- Colors: Unknown

Personnel
- Owner: Sheldon Fairbanks
- Head coach: Eddie Casey

Team history
- Boston Bears (1940)

League / conference affiliations
- American Football League III (1940)

The Boston Bears were a professional American football team that competed in the third American Football League in 1940. Owned by Sheldon H. Fairbanks, the team played its home games in the Fenway Park in Boston, Massachusetts. Coach Eddie Casey’s team was a competitive one, finishing the 1940 season with a 5-4-1 record, good for third place in the AFL, behind league champions Columbus Bullies and second-place Milwaukee Chiefs.

But success on the field did not transform itself into success in the stands. The Bears became the third professional football team to leave Boston in the space of four years (behind the Redskins of the NFL (which moved to Washington in 1937) and the Boston Shamrocks (of the defunct second American Football League, which folded in 1937; the Shamrocks lasted one more year as an independent team before calling it quits). Before the league’s annual preseason meeting, Fairbanks announced the dissolution of the team (in the meeting, the league tabbed Detroit for an expansion team for the 1941 season to replace the Bears; the team later asked the league for a deferment until 1942, which was granted; but the league suspended operations in the wake of the Pearl Harbor attack and the U.S. entry into World War II). Boston would welcome the Boston Yanks of the NFL in the late 1940s, but not have a stable major league football franchise until 1960, when the fourth American Football League’s Boston Patriots started play.

Year	W	L	T	Finish	Coach
1940	5	4	1	3rd (AFL)	Eddie Casey
