= Boston Garden =

Arena in Boston, Massachusetts, US (1928–1997)

- "The Garden"
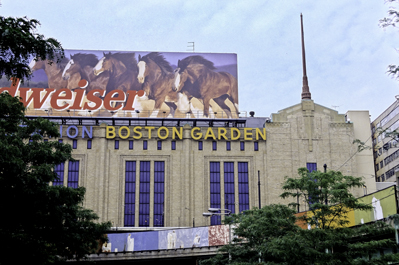
- Boston Garden viewed from Causeway Street 1994
- Interactive map of Boston Garden
- Former names: Boston Madison Square Garden
- Address: 150 Causeway Street
- Location: Boston, Massachusetts
- Coordinates: 42°21′57″N 71°3′42″W
- Owner: Boston and Maine Corporation (1928–1965); Linnell & Cox (1965–1973); Storer Broadcasting (1973–1975); Delaware North (1975–1997)
- Operator: Madison Square Garden Corporation (1928–1934); Boston Garden-Arena Corporation (1934–1973); Storer Broadcasting (1973–1975); Delaware North (1975–1997)
- Capacity: Ice hockey: 14,448; Basketball: 14,890; Concerts: 15,909
- Surface: Ice / Parquet floor

Construction
- Groundbreaking: December 1927
- Opened: November 17, 1928
- Closed: September 28, 1995
- Demolished: March 1998 – September 1998
- Cost: $4 million ($75 million in 2025 dollars)
- Architects: Tex Rickard; Funk & Wilcox Company
- General contractors: Dwight P. Robinson Company, Inc.

Tenants
- Boston Bruins (NHL) (1928–1995); Boston Celtics (BAA/NBA) (1946–1995); Boston Braves (AHL) (1971–1974); New England Whalers (WHA) (1973–1974); Boston Blazers (MILL) (1992–1995)

The Boston Garden was an arena in Boston, Massachusetts. Designed by boxing promoter Tex Rickard, who also built the third iteration of New York's Madison Square Garden, it opened on November 17, 1928, as "Boston Madison Square Garden" (later shortened to just "Boston Garden") and outlived its original namesake by 30 years. It was above North Station, a train station which was originally a hub for the Boston and Maine Railroad and is now a hub for MBTA Commuter Rail and Amtrak trains.

The Garden hosted home games for the Boston Bruins of the National Hockey League (NHL) and the Boston Celtics of the National Basketball Association (NBA), as well as rock concerts, amateur sports, boxing and professional wrestling matches, circuses, and ice shows. It was also used as an exposition hall for political rallies such as the speech by John F. Kennedy in November 1960. Boston Garden was demolished in 1998, three years after the completion of its successor arena, TD Garden.

== Design ==
Rickard built the arena specifically with boxing in mind, believing every seat should be close enough to see the "sweat on the boxers' brows". Because of this design theme, fans were much closer to the players during Bruins and Celtics games than in most arenas, leading to a distinct hometown advantage. This physical proximity also created spectacular acoustic effects, much like the Chicago Stadium.

Due to the success of the Celtics in the 1980s, the Boston Garden was one of the most difficult buildings for visiting NBA teams. During the 1985–86 season, the Celtics were 40–1 at home, setting the NBA record for home court mastery (the San Antonio Spurs tied the record 30 years later in the 2015–16 season). They also finished the post-season undefeated at home. Combined with the following regular season, the Celtics' Garden record was 79–3 between the 1985–86 and 1986–87 regular seasons.

While the parquet floor was an important part of the history of the Celtics, it was not originally part of the Garden. The parquet floor was built and installed in the Boston Arena (first home of the Bruins hockey team) and moved to the Garden in 1952. It is said the Celtics knew which way the basketball would bounce off any section of the floor; this was one contributing factor to the Celtics' many NBA championships. The floor became as much a part of Boston sports lore as the Green Monster of Fenway Park. The parquet floor was used at the FleetCenter until December 22, 1999. Portions of the original floor are integrated with new parquet.

The floor was cut into small pieces and sold as souvenirs along with seats and bricks. The Naden/Day Industries overhead scoreboard (which was electro-mechanical, not electronic, as more recent arenas used) hung in the Boston Garden-themed food court of the Arsenal Mall in Watertown until 2018, when the mall began to undergo renovations. The Celtics' old championship banners and retired numbers now hang at the team's now-former practice facility in Waltham; a new set of banners was made for the move to the FleetCenter (now TD Garden). The Celtics used to raise Eastern Division championship banners at Boston Garden in the 1960s, but stopped this practice by the 1970s. Likewise, the Bruins made a new set of banners when they moved to the FleetCenter, which were again replaced after the 2011 Stanley Cup Final with six new banners, each using the contemporary logo of the Bruins when each Cup victory occurred. The Bruins also raised numerous Adams Division, Presidents' Trophy and Wales Conference championship banners at the old Garden, but due to lack of space, they consolidated them into one single banner each upon moving to TD Garden.

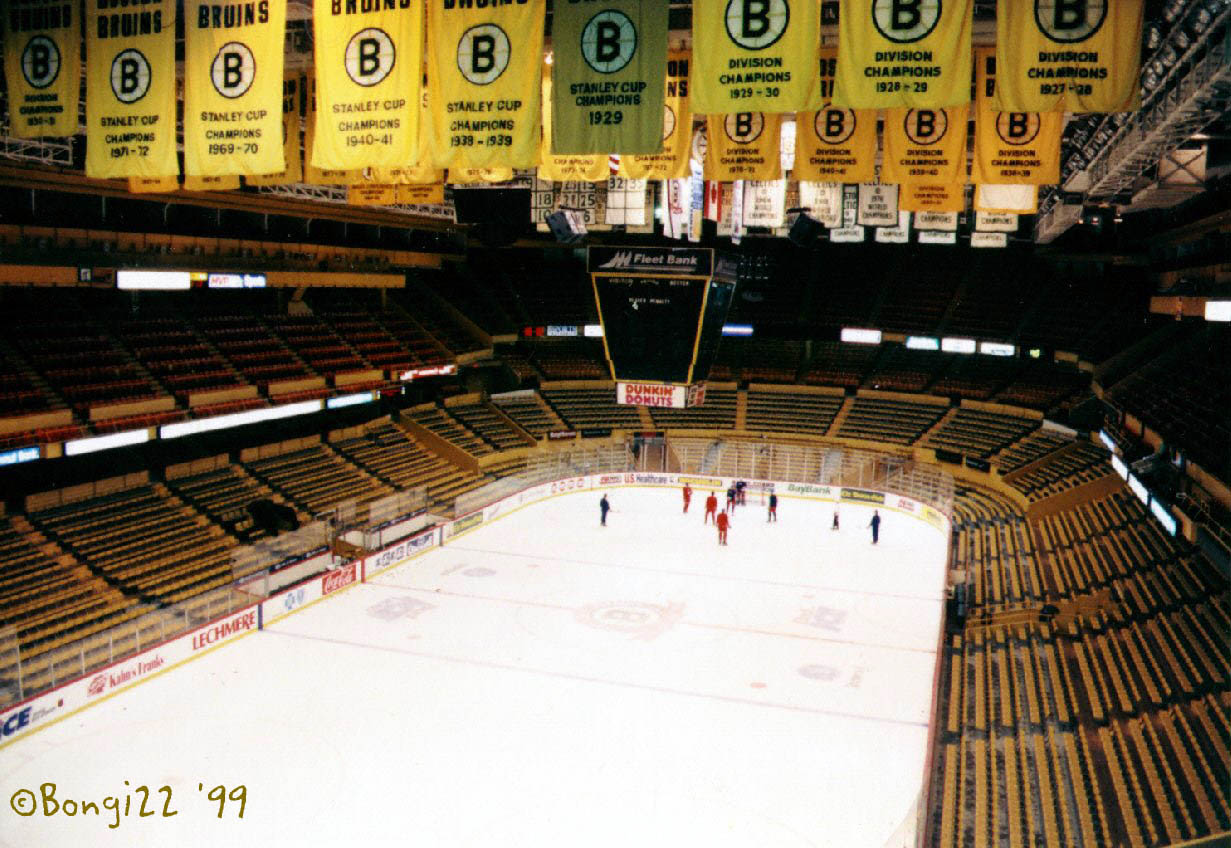
Shot of the New York Rangers practicing in Boston Garden

=== Flaws ===
The Garden's hockey rink was undersized at 191 by 83 feet (58.2 m × 25.3 m), some nine feet shorter and two feet narrower than standard (200 ft × 85 ft or 61 m × 26 m), due to the rink being built at a time when the NHL did not have a standard size for rinks. This size matched the size of the Boston Arena ice surface, the original home of the Bruins. When the Bruins moved in as tenant, the Boston Arena had had a 220-by-90-foot (67 m × 27 m) ice surface; this was reduced so as to add more seats. The Boston Arena, later renamed the Matthews Arena, modified its ice surface in 1995 to the standard-length 200-by-80-foot (61 m × 24 m) rink, which was used until 2026 for college hockey. Visiting players were frequently thrown off their games by the differing setup of the players' benches being on opposing sides of the ice, as well as the non-standard penalty box locations. This also was the setup in the Boston Arena. This setup, still occasionally seen in college hockey, was done to ensure that each team could have a bench connected to their dressing room. Towards the end of the Garden's life as an arena, the NHL required all rinks to have both benches on the same side: the Garden obliged by moving the penalty boxes (formerly adjacent to the Bruins' bench) to the side vacated by the visitor's bench, and as such visiting teams were required to skate across the ice to head back to their rooms.

The Garden's earlier Bulova-crafted "Sports Timer" game clock system using the typical analog dial-type game clock design of that era, said to have been installed at the Garden early in the 1940s, and essentially identical in appearance and function to the one used in the Chicago Stadium until September 1975, was removed and replaced by an all-digital-display unit created by the Day Sign Company of Toronto in time for the 1970 Stanley Cup playoffs, and remained in use until the Garden's closure.

The Garden had no air conditioning, resulting in fog forming over the ice during some Bruins' playoff games. During Game 5 of the 1984 NBA Finals, the 97 °F (36 °C) heat in the facility was so intense that oxygen tanks were provided to exhausted Lakers players.

The Bruins' Stanley Cup finals appearances in 1988 and 1990 were both disrupted by power outages. On May 24, 1988, a 1930s vintage 4160V switchgear failed and the emergency generator did not start during Game 4 of the Finals between the Bruins and the Edmonton Oilers, causing the game to be suspended; Game 4 was replayed in its entirety in Edmonton two days later. Two years later, on May 15, 1990, the lights went out during an overtime finals game between the same two teams. However, the lights were on an automatic timer and could be turned back on this time with the game ending with a 3–2 triple overtime win for the visiting Oilers.

== History ==
=== Founding ===
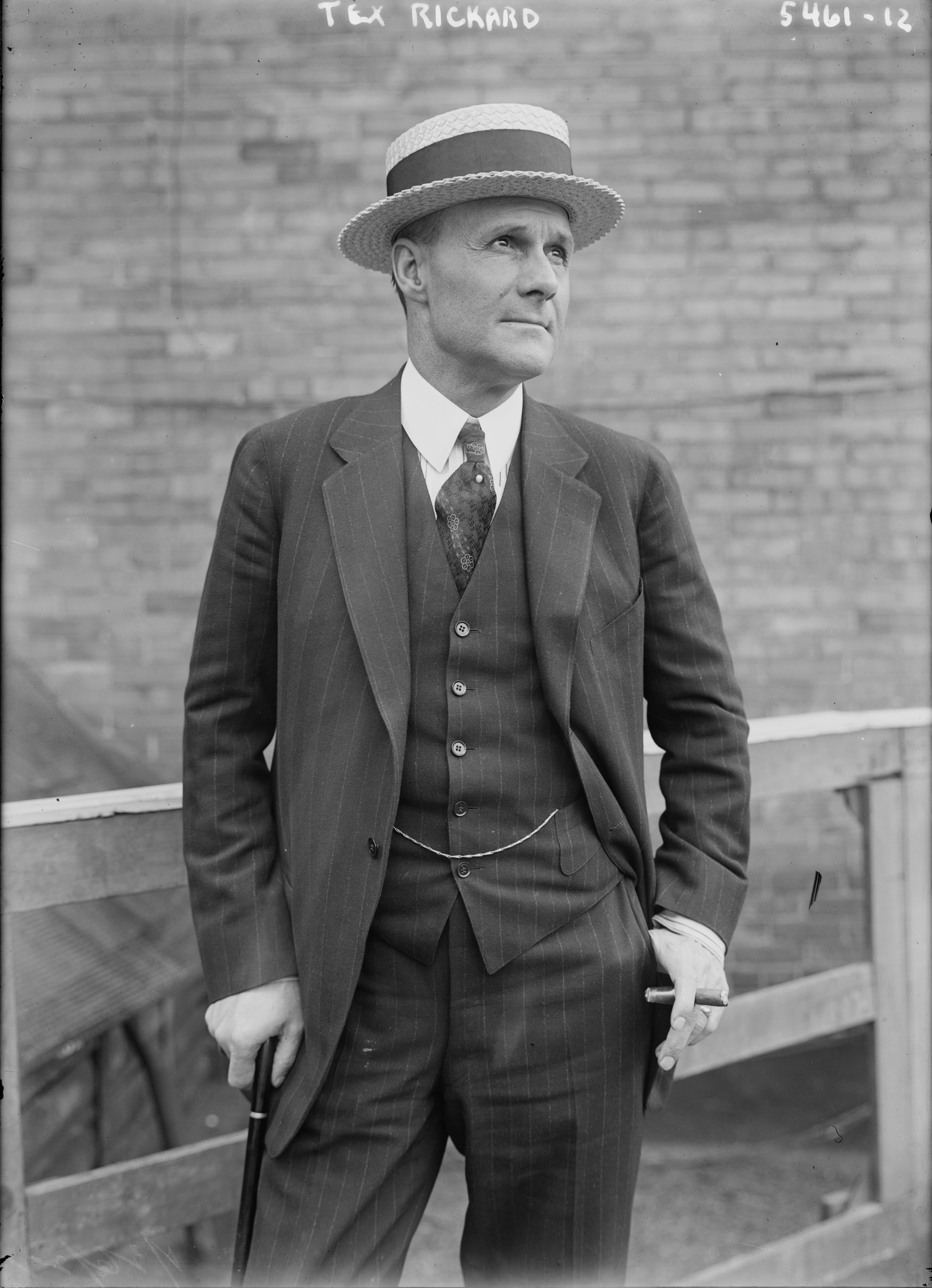
Tex Rickard, president of the Madison Square Garden Corporation, opened the Boston Garden in November 1928.

Tex Rickard, the noted entrepreneur and boxing promoter who built and operated the third Madison Square Garden, sought to expand his empire by building seven "Madison Square Gardens" around the country. On November 15, 1927, Homer Loring, chairman of the Boston & Maine Railroad, announced that plans had been finalized for the construction of a new North Station facility, which would include a sports arena. A group led by Rickard, John S. Hammond, and William F. Carey of the Madison Square Garden Corporation, as well as Boston businessmen Charles F. Adams and Huntington Hardwick, signed a 25-year lease for the arena. Sheldon Fairbanks was chosen to be the arena's first general manager. Boston & Maine shareholder Edmund D. Codman challenged the legality of the railroad constructing a non-railroad building. The Massachusetts General Court passed legislation expanding the corporate powers of the Boston & Maine Railroad which was signed by Governor Alvan T. Fuller on March 6, 1928. Codman's Bill in equity was dismissed by Massachusetts Supreme Court Justice John Crawford Crosby in October 1928. Built at a cost of $10 million – over double the cost for New York's arena three years earlier – Boston Garden turned out to be the last of Rickard's proposed series, a decision fueled by rising costs and Rickard's untimely death in early 1929 due to a ruptured appendix, the arena was only 2 months old when Rickard died.

The Garden's first event was on November 17, 1928, a boxing card headlined by Boston Native "Honey Boy" Dick Finnegan's defeat of Andre Routis. The first team sporting event was held three days later, an ice hockey game between the Bruins and their archrival, the Montreal Canadiens, won by the Canadiens 1–0. The game was attended by 17,000 fans, 2,000 over capacity, as fans without tickets stormed their way in. The game started 25 minutes late. Windows and doors were broken by the fans in the action. The first non-sporting event, a conclave featuring evangelist Rodney "Gipsy" Smith, was held on March 24, 1929.

=== Early years ===
The Boston Garden was originally owned by the Boston and Maine Corporation and controlled by Rickard and the Madison Square Garden.

During the early years of the Boston Garden, the building's main draws were boxing, wrestling, and Bruins hockey. Johnny Indrisano, Lou Brouillard, Ernie Schaaf, Al Mello, and Jack Sharkey were among the boxers who fought at the Boston Garden. Wrestling became big due to the popularity of Gus Sonnenberg. Sonnenberg defeated Ed "Strangler" Lewis at the Garden in 1929 in a fight that set an attendance record for a wrestling match (19,500) and drew a record gate ($77,000). Paul Bowser promoted wrestling in Boston at this time, and when the sport began to lose popularity, he brought Danno O'Mahony from Ireland to Boston. O'Mahony became a popular draw at the Garden.

In 1930, construction on the Hotel Manger, a 500-room hotel connected to the Boston Garden through an elevated skyway, was completed. The hotel (later known as the Hotel Madison) closed in 1976 and was demolished in 1983.

Under the leadership of manager Dick Dunn, the Boston Garden booked a wide variety of events, including an Aimee Semple McPherson revival, a welterweight championship bout between Young Jack Thompson and Lou Brouillard, New England's first rodeo event, and a Reinald Werrenrath concert. Dunn was able to bring the Garden from a deficit to a $200,000 profit in his first year as manager.

The Boston Garden also promoted events at Rockingham Park in Salem, New Hampshire, including the New England States Fair, automobile races, and Grand Circuit harness racing stakes races.

In 1933, the Boston Athletic Association Indoor Games moved from the Boston Arena to the larger Garden. The games remained at the Garden until they ended in 1971.

The Garden suffered economically during the Great Depression. Boxing was at a low point in Boston, as fighters chose to work in other cities, wrestling attendance was down, and hockey attendance waned after Ace Bailey suffered a severe head injury at the hands of Bruin Eddie Shore in 1933. In 1934, the Madison Square Garden Corporation sold its interest in the Boston Garden to the Boston Arena Corporation, led by Henry G. Lapham. This resulted in the creation of the Boston Garden-Arena Corporation. George V. Brown served as general manager of the Garden under the Boston Garden-Arena Corporation until his death in 1937, when he was succeeded by his son, Walter A. Brown.

During the Depression, Sonja Henie's Hollywood Ice Revue and the Ice Follies were successful draws and kept the Garden afloat. In 1939, a financial dispute between Henie and her managers led Walter Brown and eight other arena managers to found the Ice Capades.

=== Seating capacity ===
Basketball
Years	Capacity
1928–1968	13,909
1968–1969	14,933
1970–1971	15,203
1971–1972	15,315
1972–1983	15,320
1983–1995	14,890

Hockey
Years	Capacity
1928–1968	13,909
1968–1969	14,659
1969–1970	14,835
1970–1971	14,994
1971–1972	14,995
1972–1975	15,003
1975–1976	14,567
1976–1977	14,697
1977–1978	14,602
1978–1979	14,654
1979–1982	14,673
1982–1983	14,685
1983–1988	14,451
1988–1995	14,448

== Notable events ==
=== Music ===
Rudy Vallée and his orchestra performed at the Garden on April 21, 1932. Vallée returned to the Garden on October 23–24, 1938, for a "battle of the bands" with Benny Goodman that drew 25,000.

The first rock concert held at the Garden was on November 30, 1956, when the building hosted Alan Freed's "Biggest Show of 1956".

The Beatles played a show at the Garden during their first US/Canada tour on September 12, 1964, staying at the then-attached Hotel Madison.

James Brown played a notable show at the Garden on April 5, 1968, the night after Martin Luther King Jr. was assassinated. Only 2,000 attended the sold-out show, because the mayor, Kevin White, and community leaders had encouraged people to obtain refunds on their tickets and instead watch a hastily arranged television broadcast of the concert on the local public station WGBH-TV. Mayor White appeared on stage, asking the Garden audience and the city to peacefully remember King, and James Brown's words and presence was credited with helping to keep the peace in Boston. WGBH rebroadcast the concert twice that night, an action which helped keep people off of the street at a time other major cities were erupting in riots. The performance was released on DVD as Live at the Boston Garden: April 5, 1968.

Elvis Presley performed in Boston only once, at the Garden on November 10, 1971, pulling a full crowd of about 16,500 and receiving high praise from Rolling Stone journalist Jon Landau for his performance.

In 1972, The Rolling Stones were scheduled to perform at the Garden when two members were detained by Rhode Island police. Fearful that angry Stones fans (already in the Garden awaiting the show) would riot, mayor Kevin H. White intervened with the Rhode Island authorities and secured the musicians' release so they could play their set in Boston. The band had also played at the venue in 1965 and 1969 and would again in 1975.

In 1973, The Who was scheduled to perform at the Garden and nearly didn't perform due to the band being detained by police after destroying a hotel room in Montreal, Quebec, Canada, where they'd appeared the previous evening. The band was eventually released from jail and managed to arrive at the Garden in time for their show and took out their frustrations for being arrested the night before by delivering a blistering set and taunting the Montreal police, dedicating their performance of "Won't Get Fooled Again" to them. Who drummer Keith Moon (for the rest of the Quadrophenia tour) changed one of the lyrics to the song "Bell Boy" from "remember the gaff where the doors we smashed" to "remember Montreal at the hotel we trashed" or variations of the band being arrested. Almost three years later in March 1976, Moon collapsed at his drum kit during the second song "Substitute" after downing muscle relaxers and brandy before the show. The band had to reschedule the performance for early April and the rescheduled performance turned out to be one of The Who's best performances of the 1976 tour.

The Who's last performance at the Garden was in December 1979 on their first tour following Moon's death. That performance was almost canceled after several fans at a Who show in Cincinnati died while trying to get in early for a general admission show. The Boston City Council held a televised hearing on whether to allow the show to go forward and decided to permit it because there was no general admission seating in Boston. The show was marred by a fan throwing a firecracker on stage, causing Pete Townshend to scream obscenities in the general direction of the source before getting on with the tension-filled show.

In 1975, Led Zeppelin was banned from performing at the Boston Garden after concert fans were allowed in the lobby due to sub-freezing temperatures while waiting for tickets to go on sale for the band's show. Turning on the generosity of their hosts, some of the fans rioted, broke into the Garden and trashed the seating area, the ice, and most of the refreshment stands, leading then-mayor White to cancel the upcoming show and ban the group for five years.

In 1976, Kiss was banned from performing at the Garden because the band refused to comply with the venue's no pyrotechnic policy after fire marshals had watched their flamethrowers hit the ceiling at the Orpheum.

Pink Floyd was the first band to perform at the Boston Garden with a stage set that cost over $1 million on their 1977 Animals tour (they first played there in 1975 on the band's Wish You Were Here tour). According to Pink Floyd drummer Nick Mason's book Inside Out: A Personal History of Pink Floyd, Pink Floyd almost got banned from the Boston Garden after their 1977 performances because the band, unknown to the venue's owners, used pyrotechnics during their performance (the exploding pig for "Pigs (Three Different Ones)" and firework displays on "Sheep" and "Money"). However, the band's road crew outsmarted the fire marshals by removing the pyro props quickly after they used them in the shows to prevent the band from being banned and also according to Mason's book since their manager had an Irish name (Steve O'Rourke), the band escaped being arrested. The band decided not to play at the venue again, instead opting for the Providence Civic Center and Foxboro Stadium on their 1987/1988 and 1994 tours, respectively.

The Grateful Dead performed at the Boston Garden more times than any other band, with 24 performances from 1973 to 1994 (as an opener or middle of bill or headliner), and were intended to be the last band to play the Garden, with six shows scheduled for September 13, 14, 15, 17, 18, and 19, 1995, which were canceled due to the death of Jerry Garcia on August 9, 1995. The ticket for the 19th stated "we're gonna tear this old building down" referencing the song "Samson and Delilah". The Dead did not play at the Garden for a number of years following an incident in which they were caught grilling lobsters on a fire escape before a performance. The Grateful Dead have released Dick's Picks Volume 12 and 17 culled from performances at the Garden on June 28, 1974, and September 25, 1991.

Detroit rocker Bob Seger recorded a bulk of his 1981 double live album Nine Tonight at The Boston Garden in October 1980. Five years before, The J. Geils Band recorded most of their November 1975 show at The Boston Garden for their 1976 double live album Blow Your Face Out. The Geils band returned again, and had the historical distinction of being the first band in history to sell out a three-night stand in 1982 at the Garden featuring hometown favorites Jon Butcher Axis as opening act.

Hometown band Aerosmith performed at the Boston Garden ten times from 1975 to 1995 and twice played New Year's shows there, ringing in the 1990 and 1994 New Years.

Other acts that performed at the Garden include Pavarotti, Frank Sinatra, Liberace, Duke Ellington, Judy Garland, Arthur Fiedler and the Boston Pops, U2, Bruce Springsteen, Guns N' Roses, Nine Inch Nails, Tom Petty, Grace Slick with Jefferson Airplane, Jethro Tull (who had 15 headlining performances there between 1971 and 1980 which is the most for a band, their last being on 1980's A Tour before switching to the Worcester Centrum in 1982), Bob Dylan with The Band, Diana Ross & the Supremes, The Jackson 5, Queen, Rush, Styx and George Burns and Gracie Allen among others.

The opening of the Worcester Centrum and the Great Woods Amphitheater caused a massive drop in concerts at the Garden from the early 1980s until the early 1990s. The age of glam metal practically passed the Garden by completely, as most bands from that era played the Centrum in the winter and Great Woods in the summer. Poor acoustics, a busy sports schedule, expensive booking fees, and difficulty with local unions all contributed to the migration to more modern venues outside of Boston.

Under new Garden President Larry Moulter, bands started returning to the Garden in the late 1980s and early 1990s, highlighted by Pearl Jam's multi-night stand in 1994, and the Dead's lengthy residences there before the Garden finally closed. The final New Year's Eve show at the Boston Garden was performed by the Vermont band Phish on December 31, 1994. On that night, the band rode a giant hot dog float above the audience; the hot dog is now in the Rock and Roll Hall of Fame in Cleveland.

=== Sports ===
The facility hosted games in the 1929, 1930, 1932, 1939, 1941, 1943, 1946, 1953, 1957, 1958, 1970, 1972, 1974, 1977, 1978, 1988, and 1990 Stanley Cup Finals where the Bruins won two of their championships at the Garden in 1939 and 1970. The 1929 Stanley Cup championship was won at New York's Madison Square Garden (III). The 1941 Stanley Cup championship was won at Detroit's Olympia Stadium. The 1972 Stanley Cup championship was won at New York's Madison Square Garden. The Montreal Canadiens claimed the Stanley Cup at the Garden in 1958, 1977 and 1978, while the Detroit Red Wings won the cup there in 1943. In 1990, the Edmonton Oilers claimed their fifth Stanley Cup at the Garden. The 1932 series did not involve the Bruins; Game 2 between the Toronto Maple Leafs and New York Rangers was played there due to a scheduling conflict at MSG III. The New England Whalers played playoff games at the Garden prior to moving from Boston, which included the 1973 Avco Cup Final, where the Whalers beat the Winnipeg Jets in game five by a score of 9–6 to win their only WHA championship.

The facility has also hosted games in the 1957, 1958, 1959, 1960, 1961, 1962, 1963, 1964, 1965, 1966, 1968, 1969, 1974, 1976, 1981, 1984, 1985, 1986, and 1987 NBA Finals, in which the Celtics won nine of their championships on home court in 1957, 1960, 1961, 1962, 1964, 1965, 1966, 1984, and 1986. The only visitor to claim the NBA championship at the Garden were the Los Angeles Lakers, who won the 1985 Finals.

In addition to championship rounds, the Garden also hosted the NBA All-Star Game in 1951, 1952, 1957, and 1964, and the NHL All-Star Game in 1971. The NCAA Frozen Four was contested there from 1972 to 1974. Starting in 1955, the Beanpot tournament, featuring the four major college hockey programs in the Boston area, was held at the Garden annually on the first week of February. Due to the popularity of the Beanpot, Garden management created a second college hockey event, the Boston Garden Christmas Hockey Festival, in 1963. This was replaced by the ECAC Christmas Hockey Tournament, which was held from 1966 to 1972.

Boston Garden was the first arena to host the Stanley Cup Final and NBA Finals at the same time in 1957. It occurred again in 1958 and 1974.

The Boston Garden was a frequent host of Vince McMahon's WWF for many years throughout the 1970s and 1980s, in the form of wrestling "house shows" (non-televised matches), and superstars like Hulk Hogan, André the Giant, Randy "Macho Man" Savage, Tito Santana, Ricky "The Dragon" Steamboat and many others would regularly appear there. But despite this relationship, the Boston Garden was host to only one pro wrestling pay-per-view in its history: the 1993 Survivor Series. The WWF held their final house show in the Boston Garden on May 13, 1995.

=== Rallies and speeches ===
The Boston Garden hosted many religious conclaves. Evangelists who appeared at the Garden include Aimee McPherson (1931), Billy Graham (1950) Bishop Fulton J. Sheen (1953), and Jimmy Swaggart (July 29–31, 1983).

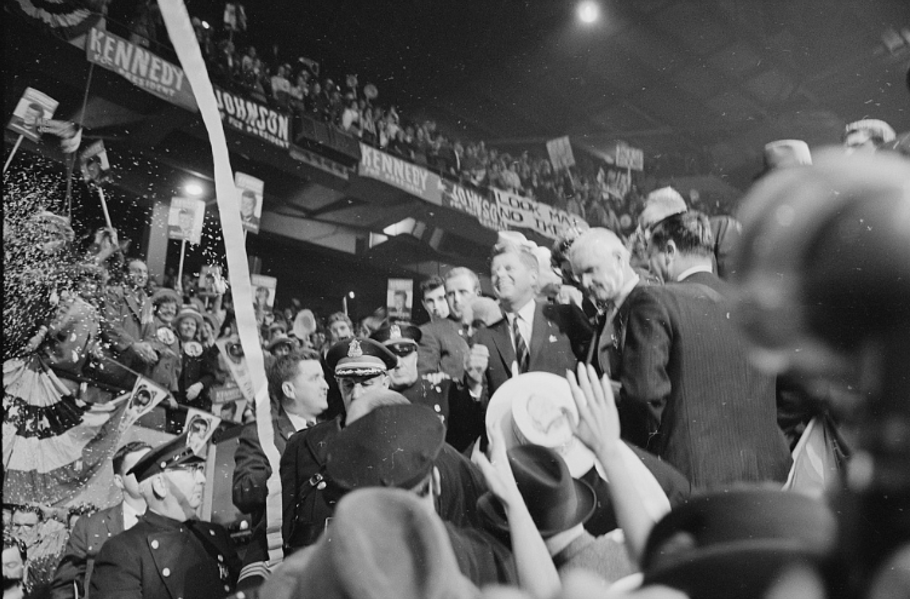
John F. Kennedy (center) surrounded by supporters at the Boston Garden on the night before Election Day, c. November 7, 1960

The Garden was also the site of a number of political rallies. 20,000 people attended a 55th birthday celebration for President Franklin D. Roosevelt on January 29, 1937. FDR also drew another 20,000 for a political rally 1940. On May 2, 1943, the night after the Hollywood Victory Caravan came through town, a Jewish anti-Nazi rally was held at the Garden. The United War Fund hosted a rally headlined by Jimmy Durante, Greer Garson, and the Boston Symphony Orchestra. The day before the 1960 presidential election, a rally for John F. Kennedy drew 20,000 while police estimated that there were another 100,000 people in the streets outside the Garden. Other politicians to hold rallies at the Garden include presidential candidates Thomas Dewey and Dwight D. Eisenhower and former Boston mayor and Massachusetts governor James Michael Curley.

Former Irish Prime Minister and President Éamon de Valera spoke at the Garden On March 24, 1948 (Easter Sunday). British Prime Minister Winston Churchill spoke there March 31, 1949 as part of a Massachusetts Institute of Technology Convocation.

== Final years ==
By the early 1970s, Boston Garden was deteriorating. The building had no air conditioning and some seats were obstructed by structural pillars. The seats were decades old and terribly cramped. With a capacity of less than 15,000, it was one of the country's smallest major league sports arenas. The Garden also lacked luxury suites, which had become an important and much-needed source of revenue for teams in professional sports. In 1972, Boston Mayor Kevin White announced plans for a new 18,000-seat arena to be built near South Station. Plans for the arena fell through when Storer Broadcasting, then-owner of the Boston Garden and the Bruins, announced they would not be able to pay the $24 to $28 million required for the new arena. Storer Broadcasting ended up selling the Bruins and the Boston Garden to Jeremy Jacobs who owned Delaware North in 1975. In 1977, the Boston Celtics negotiated with the city of Quincy to have a $30 million, 21,000-seat arena built there.

Partially due to the deteriorating conditions in the Boston Garden, the Celtics did not play a full 41-game home schedule at the arena during its final 21 seasons. Between the 1974–75 and the 1994–95 seasons, the Celtics played a few home games at the Hartford Civic Center (now PeoplesBank Arena) in Hartford, Connecticut.

In 1979, Boston Celtics owner Harry T. Mangurian, Jr. threatened to build a new arena unless the Boston Bruins, who owned the Garden, agreed to lower the rent. The team met with Ogden Corp., owners of Suffolk Downs, who proposed a $20 million, 18,000-seat arena to be built near the racetrack. They also met with the Boston Redevelopment Authority, who proposed $40 million, 15,000-seat arena that would be built behind the existing Garden and paid for with state bonds. The Bruins meanwhile announced plans to move to a proposed $50 million sports complex on the site of the then closed Rockingham Park in Salem, New Hampshire. The plans for the Salem site were eventually killed by the New Hampshire General Court. Meanwhile, the track remained closed until May 26, 1984.

In response to the Bruins' plans to leave the state, U.S. Senator Paul Tsongas established a committee to put forward a plan for a new Boston arena. The committee, chaired by Tsongas, proposed a $56.8 million, 16,000-seat arena that would be paid for by tax-exempt bonds floated by an Arena Authority and by raising the commonwealth's hotel tax from 5.7% to 8%. The naming rights to the proposed arena were sold to Sheraton for $2 million. Tsongas' proposal died in the state legislature.

While a preservation study conducted by the Boston Landmarks Commission found the North Station/Boston Garden complex to be a significant example of Art Deco, the Massachusetts Historical Commission did not consider it eligible for listing in the National Register.

In 1985, Garden-owner Delaware North and developer Rosalind Gorin each submitted proposals for a new arena, hotel, and office development. Both proposals were rejected by the Boston Redevelopment Authority and Mayor Raymond Flynn. The two groups later resubmitted plans, with Delaware North's calling for a renovation of the Garden instead of having it demolished. Gorin's plan called for the city to claim the Garden by eminent domain, as Delaware North refused to sell the Bruins and the Garden to a group led by Gorin, Paul Tsongas, and former Bruins Wayne Cashman and Bobby Orr. Delaware North was awarded the rights to construct the new arena, but poor economic conditions delayed the project.

On May 8, 1992, Delaware North announced they had secured funding for a new arena in the form of $120 million worth of loans evenly split among Bank of Boston, Fleet Bank of Massachusetts, and Shawmut National Corporation. That December, a bill approving construction of the new arena was killed in the Massachusetts Senate by Senate President William M. Bulger. Legislative leaders and Delaware North attempted to reach an agreement on plans for the new arena, but in February 1993 Delaware North owner Jeremy Jacobs announced he was backing out of the project as a result of the legislature's demand his company pay $3.5 million in "linkage payments".

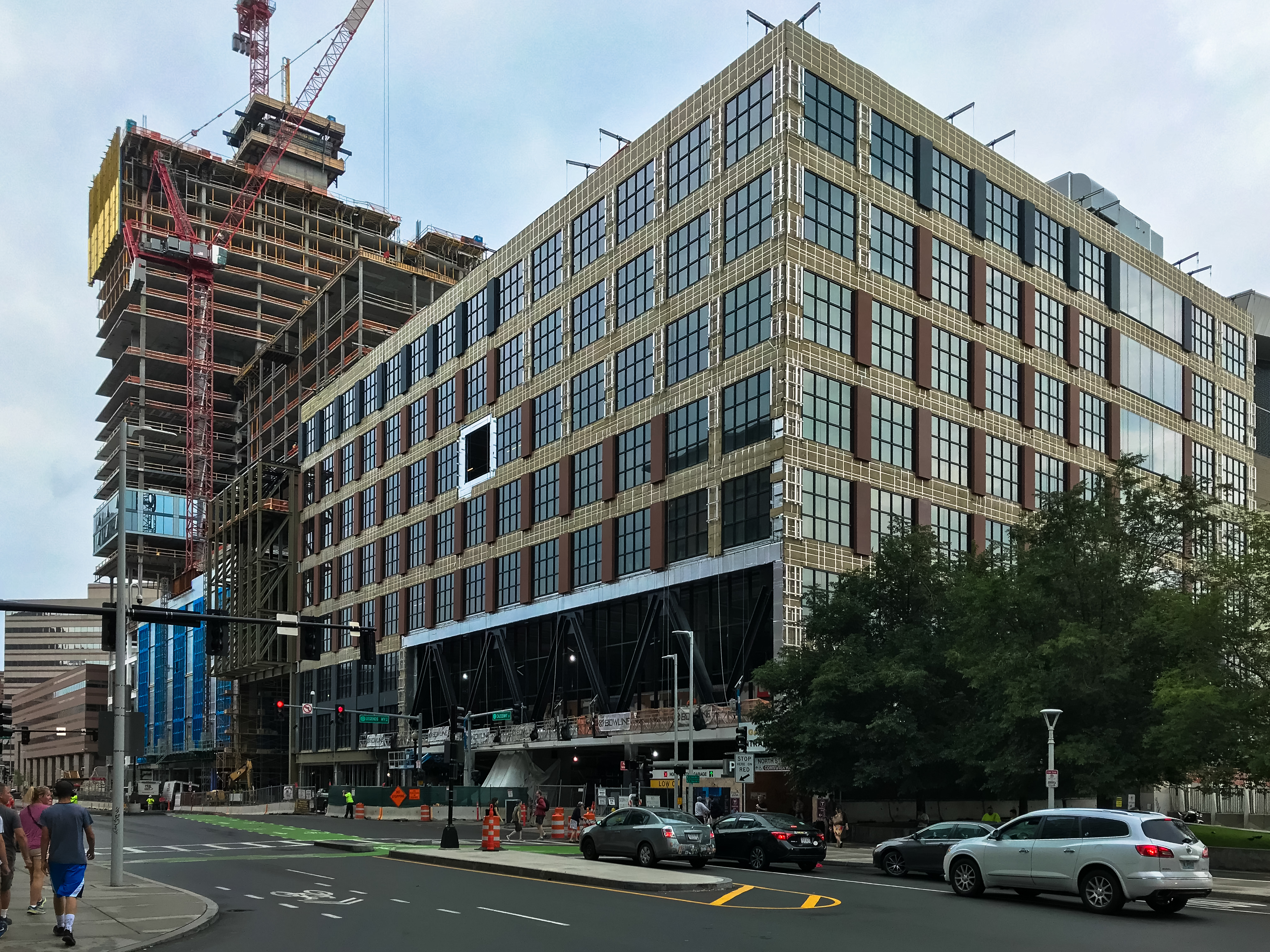
Construction progress of The Hub on Causeway in August 2018. The Hub on Causeway sits on the former site of the Boston Garden.

Two weeks later, after a new series of negotiations, the two sides came to an agreement, and on February 26 the Legislature passed a bill that allowed for construction of a new sports arena. Construction began on April 29, 1993. Shawmut Bank purchased the naming rights for the new building with the intent of calling it the "Shawmut Center", but it was purchased by FleetBank before the new arena opened, and thus the "FleetCenter" opened on September 30, 1995. In 2005, the FleetCenter was renamed the "TD Banknorth Garden", as Bank of America had acquired Fleet Bank and relinquished its predecessor's naming rights, selling them to TD Banknorth. As of 2009, it is known as TD Garden.

The Grateful Dead were scheduled to play September 13, 14, 15, 17, 18 and 19, 1995, as the final event at the Garden. The ticket for the 19th featured the phrase "let’s tear this old building down" referencing the song "Samson and Delilah". These shows were cancelled upon Jerry Garcia's death. The last official game played at the Garden took place on Sunday, May 14, 1995. It was Game 5 of an NHL Eastern Conference quarterfinal series between the Boston Bruins and the eventual Stanley Cup champion New Jersey Devils, where the Devils beat the Bruins 3–2 and won the series in five games. The last sporting event at the Boston Garden was a preseason game between the Boston Bruins and the Montreal Canadiens on September 26, 1995. In a special post-game ceremony, which included many former Bruins greats, the banners and retired numbers were removed. The final event in the Boston Garden occurred on the evening of September 29, 1995; a farewell event was held in the old Boston Garden hosted by WBZ-TV news personality Liz Walker and CBS national news anchor Dan Rather. Attendees included Bruins legends such as Bobby Orr and Phil Esposito as well as Celtics greats Larry Bird and Red Auerbach. The ceremony concluded with the release of thousands of balloons into the rafters to the music of the Boston Pops. The Boston Globe stated that "all New England has lost a friend." The Garden sat vacant for three years before it was demolished in 1998. The site where the building once stood is currently a commercial development called The Hub on Causeway.

Events and tenants
Preceded by Boston Arena	Home of the Boston Bruins; 1928–1995	Succeeded by TD Garden
Preceded by Boston Arena	Home of the Boston Celtics; 1946–1995	Succeeded by TD Garden
Preceded by Boston Arena	Home of the New England Whalers; 1973–1974	Succeeded by Hartford Civic Center
Preceded by first venue Rochester War Memorial Coliseum; Los Angeles Memorial Sports Arena	Host of the NBA All-Star Game; 1951–1952; 1957; 1964	Succeeded by Allen County War Memorial Coliseum; Kiel Auditorium; Kiel Auditorium
Preceded by St. Louis Arena	Host of the NHL All-Star Game; 1971	Succeeded by Metropolitan Sports Center
Preceded by Onondaga War Memorial; Syracuse, New York	Host of the Frozen Four; 1972–1974	Succeeded by St. Louis Arena; St. Louis, Missouri
Preceded by Palau Blaugrana; Barcelona	Masters Cup; Venue; 1973	Succeeded by Kooyong Stadium; Melbourne
Preceded by first arena	Host of the Boston Blazers (Old); 1992–1996	Succeeded by TD Garden
