= Space pirate =

Science fiction character trope

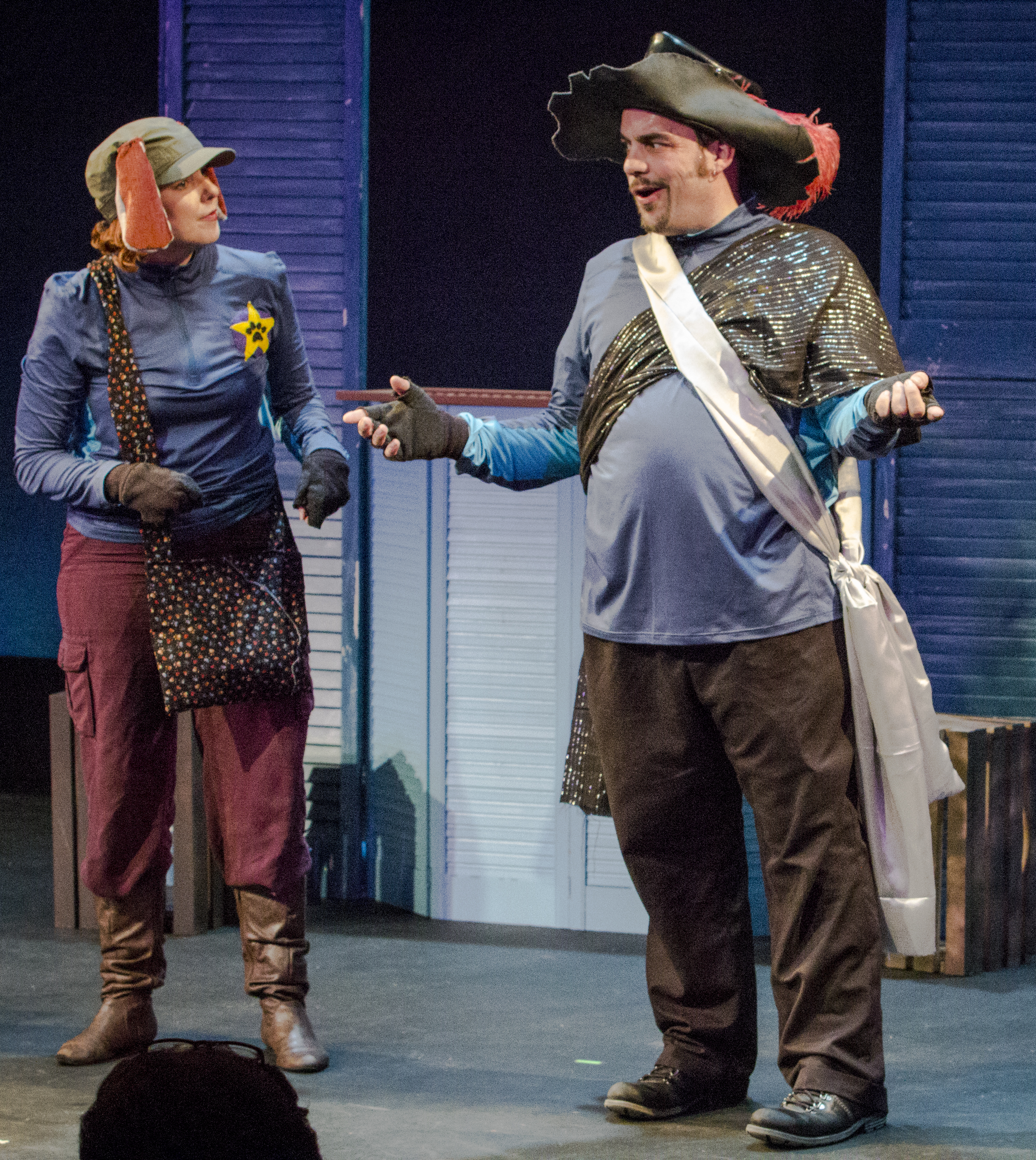
A space pirate character in The Space Pirate Puppy Musical at the Orlando International Fringe Theater Festival in 2016

Space pirates are a type of stock character from science fiction. A take on the traditional seafaring pirates of history or the fictional air pirates of the 19th century, space pirates travel through outer space. Where traditional pirates target sailing ships, space pirates serve a similar role in sci-fi media: they capture and plunder spacecraft for cargo, loot and occasionally steal spacecraft, and kill or enslave the crewmembers and passengers.

== In science fiction ==
The archetype evolved from the air pirate trope popular from the turn of the century until the 1920s. By the 1930s, space pirates were recurring villains in the Buck Rogers comic strip. However, their dress and speech may vary; it may correspond to the particular author's vision of the future, rather than their seafaring precursors. On the other hand, space pirates may be modeled after stereotypical sea pirates. They may be humans who originate from Earth or a specific race of aliens. Space pirates are common in space opera and soft science fiction, including within Japanese anime narratives and erotica.

=== 1920s to the 1960s ===
In 1925, Hugo Gernsback's science fiction novel, Ralph 124C 41+ featured a space pirate as a character. The book centers around a love story between the protagonist, Ralph and a civil scientist, with a space pirate from Mars also "vying for her affections," part of the scientific speculation of the novel itself. Around the same time, author Henry Edward Warner, who composed his poems which were assembled in a 1929 book, Songs of the Craft, began writing various poems, including some about the "so-called space pirate." Six years later, in November 1935, Stanley G. Weinbaum's novella, The Red Peri appeared in the science fiction magazine Astounding Stories. In the novel, the primary character, Peri, is a space pirate who has a base on Pluto. The novel was praised for imaginative backgrounds, although its romance was considered to be at the level of "shopgirl pulps," and writing which leaves "much to be desired," David Bowman's helmetless spacewalk in 2001: A Space Odyssey was inspired by Frank Keene's escape from the pirate base in the novel. Following this, in 1940, Jack Williamson's story Hindsight, a space opera, included a character named Astrarch. He was a space pirate and dictator of the Solar System, with the story focusing on an attempt by those on Earth to break free of his shackles.

The 1950s brought with it a blossoming of science fiction, including a focus on computers, space travel, and outer space in general. This included Murray Leinster's novel, The Pirates of Zan, which included a "space pirate much like his typical maritime counterpart in appearance." Alfred Bester said that it wasn't until Astounding Stories was rescued from an "abyss of space pirates, mad scientists" that he was able to go back to the publication.

By 1969 there was a turn to outer space on television, with heroes changing from cowboys to "Space-Pirate-Cowboys." One year after Turner patented his game, Stanislaw Lem published The Cyberiad, a book in which two constructors named Trurl and Klapaucius are "captured by a space pirate who pillages and hoards information." In order to be freed from him, they build something which interprets "the movement of air molecules as information" and the pirate underestimates how much information is within the movement, and he is buried in a "mountain of paper filled with useless information." Later in the 1960s, the sixth serial of the sixth season of the live-action television show Doctor Who featured a gang of space pirates, with the galaxy being described as spanned by a game between those who enforce the law and pirates like Dervish and Caven who will "apparently stop at nothing to continue their lucrative racket."

=== 1970s to the 1990s ===
In the 1977 film Star Wars, the character Han Solo, who helps Luke Skywalker on his journey, is often described as a space pirate, being a smuggler and a rogue who will flee conflict despite his bravado. The same year, Leiji Matsumoto created the iconic manga series Space Pirate Captain Harlock. The character of Captain Harlock is a "mysterious space pirate captain" fighting to protect the world, which some saw as an homage to the samurai, and the stories would inspire many other characters in the years to come. Some said that Captain Harlock "set the template for anime’s "space pirate" archetype." In 1978, Daniel C. Dennett proposed a philosophical question where a viewer would have to answer three questions correctly in order to "save the world from a space pirate." The following year, the first book in Douglas Adams' Hitchhiker's Guide to the Galaxy series featured space pirates. In the story, Ford Prefect, a main character, explains that the trade routes between the center of the galaxy and outer areas were disrupted in the past by space pirates, but that they were "wiped out in the Dordellis wars," with freighter ships equipped with huge space ships thereafter. Adams also wrote a tale of space piracy in his 1978 Doctor Who serial The Pirate Planet, where pirates move a hollow planet through space.

The 1980s also brought Captain Zargon, a space pirate, and a representation of "space-age warfare," part of the Action Man toy series released by Hasbro. 1984 brought various stories including space pirates. John Steakley's novel Armor, an homage to Starship Troopers, a novel by Robert A. Heinlein published in 1959, introduces a protagonist named Felix. In the 1990 sequel, Vampires$, Jack Crow, an antihero is introduced, who is a " legendary space pirate" which may have been the "source for Johnny Depp's Jack Sparrow." The same year that Armor was published, the film, The Ice Pirates was first shown in U.S. theaters. Apart from the film being noteworthy for its cheeky, obviously cut-rate production values, mid-eighties "color-blind casting", sexual frankness, and near-deliberately slack "sitcom" direction, the film included space pirates. TCM described the film as about two space pirates being dragooned "into helping a princess find her father." The first video game in the long-running Metroid series was released in 1986. Its alien space pirate antagonists, the lizard-like Kraid and the draconic Ridley, as well as their leader, the biocomputer Mother Brain, would go on to feature in numerous future games as the nemeses of protagonist Samus Aran. The same year, Lois McMaster Bujold's novel The Warrior's Apprentice was published. The book's main character, Miles Vorkosigan, is an antihero, aristocrat, soldier, and space pirate, beginning in this novel and continuing in the Vorkosigan Saga series.

The 1990s brought various space pirates. The 1994 game Super Metroid continued the space pirate theme, having Samus chase after Ridley and his pirates. In addition, the Stephen R. Donaldson novels, This Day All Gods Die (1997) and Forbidden Knowledge (1992) include a space pirate by the name of Nick Succorso. This portrayal was criticized by the fact that Succorso may have raped the protagonist, Morn, in the latter novel, depending on how one defines the term, rape.

=== 2000s to the 2010s ===
Gameplay trailer of Flinthook, a 2017 platform video game featuring a space pirate protagonist.

The early 2000s had many space pirates as well. The anime series, FLCL, the first series which aired between 2000 and 2001, focused on the story of a carefree female rockstar who wants to "save a space pirate" from an industrial corporation with the help of main character, Nandaba Naoto. In 2002, the video game Zathura would feature space pirates as some challenges that the protagonists need to overcome. It would later be made into a film titled Zathura: A Space Adventure. More directly, in the video game Metroid Prime, which came out the same year, there is a space pirate research facility, space pirates doing "biological experiments" on creatures, natural resources, and themselves, and the pirates having an interest in mystical liquid energy. The game also includes a research area led by space pirates, monsters bred by the same pirates that try to attack the player, and the pirates threatening to destroy precious artifacts. In 2005, the film, Serenity featured a space pirate named Captain Malcolm Reynolds, who said that he "aim[s] to misbehave." He would be described by some as "good at heart" and a romantic figure. Following this, in 2009, Chris Wooding would publish a novel, Retribution Falls which some described as a "space/pirate fantasy" and a space racing game named Hooping which features pirate ships which can fire on the player with lasers, cannons, fireballs, or other projectiles.

In the 2011 novel, The Martian, adapted as a 2015 motion picture, botanist Mark Watney declares he is the first "space pirate." This garnered some discussion, with various scholars debating whether he is a space pirate, asking if his actions constitute piracy. One scholar, Christian J. Robson, stated that like in Andy Weir's Artemis, maritime law applies in space, allowing for Watney to make this claim, and argued that space law would also apply in this novel. (Note: This subject was also discussed by Klaas Willaert in an article entitled "The Martian: Can The Protagonist Be Qualified As A Space Pirate?") The line about space piracy was retained in the 2015 film. The Martian was not alone in this. In 2014, a game named Quing's Quest VII premiered. The game itself pitted the player and their lover/advisor, a genderfluid "Social Justice Pirate" named Nero against forces named Misogynerds that destroyed their planet. In The Expanse novel and TV series, space piracy is seen as a big issue with multiple organizations forming to fight off the pirates.

The later 2010s had their share of space pirates. In 2016, a reviewer in The Catholic Library World reviewed Leslie Staub's children's novel, Time for Earth School, Dewey Dew, which included a space pirate. The story's main character, Niko, asked his cousin to come for a ride in his spaceship, but before this can happen, a female space pirate whisks her away, as he tries to get find her, complete with various illustrations to "capture the mood of the story." Also that year, Michael J. Martinez, who authored the Daedalus series, which involves pirates in space and Mars, was interviewed. He said he was excited by the "notion of putting a sailing ship in space" after seeing the 2002 animated film, Treasure Planet, which features space pirates, but was disappointed. The idea was invigorated when he saw the 2003 film Master and Commander: The Far Side of the World, wondering what the notion of sailing ships in space, with a Napoleonic era setting in the Solar System, would be like. Also that year, two other stories featuring space pirates premiered. Specifically, Nicolette Barischoff's story, "Pirate Songs" (Note: It was published originally in "the anthology Accessing the Future, from The Future Fire, June 2015.") included a disabled space pirate with a glass eye named Margo who uses a high-tech chair for mobility, and The Waves Project, a webcomic, features a space pirate named Beck, who finds himself in the seedy underground of Aezerea, an "Earth-like moon." The previous year, the 2015 film, Star Wars: The Force Awakens, featured Han Solo, who is described as a "grizzled" and "underdog" space pirate with his fellow pirate, Chewbacca, and the Guardians of the Galaxy Vol. 2 film featured scenes with a blue-skinned space pirate named Yondu. A science fiction novel titled Barbary Station came out the same year, focusing on space pirates. The next year brought the film, Solo: A Star Wars Story to theaters. One of the film's characters, Val, was compared to a space pirate as she engages in heists and criminal activity. In March of the following year, a comic series titled Astro Hustle, described as a "sexy space pirate romp," began its four-issue mini-series. Accompanying this was the publication of Alastair Reynolds's novel Shadow Captain with the main character, Fura, taking in some of the personality of a ruthless space pirate, Bosa Sennen, from the previous novel, returning from his ship. This was the sequel to his 2016 novel, Revenger, the latter which features an "attack by horrifyingly sadistic pirate": Sennen. It was also described as a "swashbuckling thriller" and an "emotionally raw trilogy about a space pirate crew looking for collapsed planets." Roy McBride, main character of the film Ad Astra, fights with space pirates on the Moon before traveling to Mars. The film's screenplay mentions "mining pirates" (Note: This may be a reference to asteroid mining.) and "pirate activity."

=== 2020 to present ===
In 2020, various stories and narratives featured space pirates. In the young adult novel, Aphotic by D. R. Mattox, a main character, Ko, is shipped off onto a "self-driving, unmanned pirate ship" en route to a training camp. The Korean science fiction film Space Sweepers has a main cast of space pirates who discover a humanoid robot created as a weapon of mass destruction. This includes Captain Jang, a "mysterious ex-space pirate." L. Neil Smith's 2020 novel Henry Martyn focuses on pirates in space, specifically protagonist Henry Martyn, who tutors another to become a pirate and take up his name.

In February 2021, CBR called Hondo Ohnaka, who had appeared in Star Wars: The Clone Wars leading a group of pirates, a "lovable space pirate and smuggler," who mentors one of the protagonists of Star Wars Rebels, Ezra, with the crew of his ship reluctantly accepting him as an ally. While Hyenas, a first-person shooter revolving around space pirates who steal pop-culture relics from wealthy Martian colonists, was planned for release in 2023, it was cancelled by Sega due to a lack of confidence in its profitability.

== In the real world ==
Some have considered the idea of space pirates operating in the Solar System, with the possibility of a space-based economy, asteroid mining, debates over Extraterrestrial real estate and other space law questions. In 2018, Michael Viets proposed adding "space piracy" into the lexicon of international law and in 2019, legal scholars Alex Ramsey and Jessica Ramsey asked what would be "responsible actors" in space, saying they would not include those who are "some form of a space pirate," adding that the United States would determine the "responsible" parties in space. In May 2019, U.S. Senator Ted Cruz spoke in a congressional hearing, stating that "pirates threaten the open seas, and the same is possible in space", and defending the creation of the Space Force.

In 2019, American entrepreneur Nova Spivack declared he was the "first space pirate" for smuggling tardigrades to the Moon on board an Arch Mission Foundation lander without informing the Israeli launch company SpaceIL. Items have been taken into space without permission since the mid-1960s.

In 2025, John Wiley & Sons published "Space Piracy: Preparing for a Criminal Crisis in Orbit" by Marc Feldman and Hugh Taylor.

== List of space pirate media ==
| Work | Years | Medium | Description |
|---|---|---|---|
| The Red Peri | 1935 | Novella | Peri is the novel's protagonist and space pirate who has a base on the Moon. Additionally, some said that "the background is imaginative, but the romance is on the level of the shopgirl pulps, and the writing leaves much to be desired," with David Bowman's helmetless spacewalk in 2001: A Space Odyssey inspired by Frank Keene's escape from the pirate base the novel. |
| Lucky Starr and the Pirates of the Asteroids | 1953 | Novel | Juvenile science fiction penned by Isaac Asimov. |
| The Space Pirates | 1969 | Television serial | A Doctor Who serial starring the Second Doctor. The TARDIS materializes in the midst of a pitched battle between space pirates and the Army Space Corps. The pirates dismantle space beacons for their scrap value of a rare material. |
| The Pirates of Orion | 1974 | Television episode | An episode of Star Trek: The Animated Series, the crew of the USS Enterprise are threatened by a band of space pirates. In the episode, these Orions are shown to be ruthless pirates, As such, some recommended this episode for featuring the trio of characters Kirk, Spock, and Bones of The Original Series. Later, the Orion Syndicate was mentioned in Star Trek: Deep Space Nine, but no actual Orions were seen, only members of other species. |
| The Pirate Planet | 1978 | Television serial | A Doctor Who serial starring the Fourth Doctor, written by The Hitchhiker's Guide to the Galaxy creator Douglas Adams. A band of space pirates use their own planet to drain the life force of other planets by materializing around them; the Captain has a giant robot parrot. |
| The Ice Pirates | 1984 | Film | Space pirates raid cargo vessels carrying ice, in a system where water is scarce. |
| Metroid series | 1986–present | Video game | Space pirates are the series' primary enemies. |
| Space Quest III: The Pirates of Pestulon | 1989 | Video game | Roger visits a variety of locations, including a fast food restaurant called Monolith Burger and a desert planet called Phleebhut. At the latter, he encounters trouble, as Arnoid the Annihilator (an Arnold Schwarzenegger-like android terminator) persecutes him for not paying for a whistle acquired in Space Quest II. From the information he picks up there and at Monolith Burger, Roger eventually uncovers the sinister activities of a video game company known as ScumSoft, run by the "Pirates of Pestulon". |
| Planet Pirates series | 1990–1991 | Novel | Trilogy of novels by Anne McCaffrey. |
| Sol Bianca | 1990-1991 | Original video animation | The name of the 1990 OVA is also the name of the ship that serves as both the home and the interstellar headquarters for an all-female band of notorious pirates. Thanks to a stowaway who hides aboard their ship following one of their raids, they learn of the ultimate treasure: the Gnosis (pronounced "G'Nohsis" in dialogue), an artifact reputedly from old Earth itself. The second OVA, in 1991, centers around the crew encountering pirates "with a grudge," and their ship is "hit by a missile containing a virus. A single video game was released based on the series for the PC Engine CD-ROM² on June 29, 1990 by NCS exclusively in Japan. It's a role-playing video game. It featured the ship's crew from Sol Bianca and offered seven episodes. |
| Path of the Fury | 1992 | Novel | Written by David Weber; after a woman's family is slain by space pirates, she is possessed by a Fury and seeks revenge. |
| Wing Commander: Privateer | 1993 | Video game | A space pirate computer game based in the Wing Commander universe. A television series based on Privateer was planned to debut sometime in 1997. An unofficial fan remake entitled Wing Commander: Privateer - Gemini Gold was made using the Vega Strike engine and released in 2005. |
| Space Pirates | 1992 | Video game | The player assumes the role of a star ranger (as in all American Laser Games releases except Who Shot Johnny Rock?, the player character's name is not given, and he is referred to throughout the game as "Star Ranger") who picks up and responds to a transmission by Ursula Skye, the commander of a starship called Colonial Star One. The SOS call lets the star ranger know that the ship has been invaded by an evil group called the Black Brigade, led by Captain Talon. As the entire colony on board the ship is in danger, the player answers the distress call. Following a short target practice tutorial, consisting of shooting at fast-moving asteroids, the player heads out to the Black Dragon to defeat the space pirates. Some praised the game for "mindless fun", liking the game's futuristic setting, saying that the imaginative characters and scenery make the game much more visually appealing and atmospheric than most full motion video games. Others complained that American Laser Games' usage of the same basic format for all their games was becoming tiresome, but acknowledged that the game had good quality video and enjoyable acting and gameplay. They scored it two out of five stars, deeming it "entertaining enough, in a brain-dead sort of way". |
| Sailor Moon SuperS: The Movie | 1995 | Film | The antagonists of the film are space pirates who are involved in mass kidnappings of children on behalf of Queen Badiane, who intends to use the power of their dreams to absorb the Earth into her Black Dream Hole. |
| Outlaw Star | 1997–present | Manga, Television series | Gene Starwind and Jim Hawkins are machine repairmen who meet Hilda, a space outlaw, and through clashes with others like her, they end up "on the run with her and the cargo" that the outlaws want. |
| Independence War | 1998 | Video game | Pirates and terrorists are the target of the player in this space combat game. Followed by Independence War 2: Edge of Chaos in 2001. |
| Rayman 2: The Great Escape | 1999 | Video game | Platform game where robo-pirates from deep space have invaded Rayman's world and broken its heart into a thousand pieces of energy. |
| Sol Bianca: The Legacy | 1999–2000 | Television miniseries | In this six-episode mini-series, a group of five pirates travel across the galaxy, chased by the "army of the entire solar system." |
| Treasure Planet | 2002 | Film | Disney animated space opera version of the novel Treasure Island, the cast try to locate the treasure hoard of space pirate Captain Flint. |
| Rogue Galaxy | 2005 | Video game | When the game begins, the storyline follows a linear path, but at a certain point, the game world opens up, and the player is free to move from planet to planet using the pirate ship, Dorgenark. When Jaster learns they are space pirates working for the legendary Dorgengoa, he decides to join, maintaining the ruse that he is Desert Claw. |
| Galactic North | 2006 | Short story | This story starts in the year 2303, when Captain Irravel Veda of the lighthugger Hirondelle, her second-in-command Markarian, and some fraction of their Ultranaut crew are ambushed by pirates while engaged in an unexpected repair stopover in a cloud of rocks and cometary matter in the charted but uninhabited star system Luyten 726-8. She briefly considers activating the "Greenfly" terraforming Von Neumann machines being transported on board, which she believes would easily be able to swarm and dismantle the pirate vessel and probably aid in repair as well. She rejects this option, however, and their ship is captured by the infamous terroristic pirate Run Seven. She is tortured to reveal the codes to the security protecting her ship's cargo – twenty thousand colonists' cryopreserved bodies – but refuses due to intense psychological conditioning that makes her view the cargo as her children and do anything to protect them. Pirates also appear in the short story, "Weather," as the shipmaster, Inigo, finds a girl on a pirate ship. |
| Ratchet & Clank Future: Tools of Destruction | 2007 | Video game | The main character, Ratchet, fights through hordes of robotic Space Pirates led by Captain Romulus Slag. This game is followed by Ratchet & Clank Future: Quest for Booty, where Ratchet again fights the Space Pirates. |
| Space Pirates | 2007-2008 | Children's television series | A TV series that was aired on The BBC's CBeebies Channel between 2007 and 2008. The show is primarily aimed at children aged from four to six years old, although the show is designed to reach all ages and "bring the whole family together to explore a diverse range of musical performances." |
| Miniskirt Space Pirates/Bodacious Space Pirates | 2008–present | Light novel/ Television series | In the far future where space travel is the norm, Marika Kato, born and raised in the Tau Ceti planet Morningstar, is the newly recruited teenage captain of the space pirate ship Bentenmaru, inheriting the title from her deceased father. Apart from the anime series, she appears in the manga series of the same name, and the 2014 film, Bodacious Space Pirates: Abyss of Hyperspace. Other pirates in the show included Marika's mother, once known as "Blaster Ririka" and wife of Gonzaemon Kato (otherwise known as Captain Ironbeard), Captain Kenjo Kurihara of the Barbaroosa, helmsman Shane McDougal of the Barbaroosa, Quartz Christie of the Grand Cross, The Legendary Chef who runs the Pirate's Nest, heir to the Barbaroosa (Chiaki Kurihara), and those on the crew of the Bentenmaru. These include Misa Grandwood, Kane McDougal, Hyakume, Coorie, Schnitzer, San-Daime, and Luca. |
| Fallout 3: Mothership Zeta | 2009 | Video game | In this side-quest for Fallout 3, the Vault Dweller is abducted by aliens and must form a space pirate crew with fellow survivors, like Sally, in order to seize control of the flying saucer, steal advanced alien equipment, and teleport back to the Wastes. |
| Space Pirates and Zombies (S.P.A.Z.) | 2011-2012 | Video game. | S.P.A.Z. is an open-world game which allows players to choose which tasks to undertake during play. Players can take the role of space pirates "looking to explore the universe, expand their fleet, and make a buck or two in the process," as the player builds up their pirate fleet, allowing them to "negotiate feuding factions and eventually take on the zombie horde." |

== See also ==
- Outlaw (stock character)
- Space Cowboy (disambiguation)
- Space marine
- Space Western
- List of fictional pirates
- The Five Gold Bands
- Pirates in popular culture
- List of pirate films
