= St. Mark's School of Texas =

All-boys private school in Dallas, Texas, US

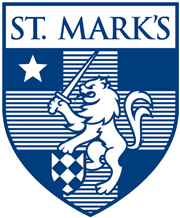

Location
- 10600 Preston Road; Dallas, Texas 75230; 32°53′25″N 96°48′03″W

Information
- Type: Private; Independent; day; college-preparatory school
- Motto: Courage and Honor
- Religious affiliation: Nonsectarian
- Established: 1906
- Headmaster: David W. Dini
- Faculty: 97 full-time teachers
- Grades: 1–12
- Gender: All-boys
- Enrollment: 923
- Campus size: 42 acres (17 ha)
- Campus type: Suburban
- Colors: Navy & Gold
- Athletics conference: SPC
- Mascot: Lion
- Nickname: Lions
- Accreditation: ISAS
- Endowment: $200 million (June 30, 2025)
- Tuition: $32,537–$40,735
- Website: smtexas.org

The St. Mark's School of Texas is a private, nonsectarian, college-preparatory day school in Dallas, Texas. Established in 1906, St. Mark's educates roughly 900 boys in grades 1-12.

== History ==
=== Terrill School for Boys ===
In 1906, Menter B. Terrill started the Terrill School for Boys in Dallas. The former president of North Texas Normal College (now the University of North Texas), Terrill had found himself out of a job in 1901 when the State of Texas acquired the formerly private institution. The thirty-year-old Terrill elected to get his second bachelor's degree from Yale, and graduated in just two years as the class valedictorian. After a year teaching at Pennsylvania's Hill School, Terrill moved back to Texas to start his own private school. The six original teachers included Terrill, his wife Ada (one of the first female graduate students at Yale), and his father, James, a former college president.

Terrill sought to build his school "in the manner of the great eastern prep schools." He heavily prioritized academics. By 1915, Terrill School had sent 14 of its 33 graduates to Ivy League colleges. The school also fielded an excellent football program, which went 144-23-8 from 1910 to 1932. 19 of Terrill's 23 losses were to college freshman squads.

In 1916, Terrill sold his school to a new headmaster, citing health problems. The school began to decline, in part due to competition from the Texas Country Day School (see below). In 1946, it transferred its assets to the Episcopal Diocese of Dallas and re-emerged as the Cathedral School for Boys.

Terrill also foresaw a need for a strong girls' school in Dallas. He encouraged Ela Hockaday to open a girls' school in Dallas in 1913, and put her in contact with prominent Dallas businessmen who wanted their daughters to get a high-quality education. Schools descended from Terrill have had some affiliation with the Hockaday School for over a century, with shared social events, artistic performances, and some classes.

=== Texas Country Day School ===
In the late 1920s, several Terrill School parents worried that Menter Terrill's successors were focusing too much on football and not enough on academics. They recruited the semi-retired Terrill to tutor their sons. Following Terrill's death in 1931, these parents started the Texas Country Day School (TCD) in 1933. Within two years of its creation, TCD was advertising that its faculty included a "Rhodes Scholar and Harvard, Dartmouth, and Amherst men."

Under the leadership of board chairmen Wirt Davis (the head of Republic Bank) and Eugene McDermott (the founder of Texas Instruments), TCD heavily prioritized academics in the same manner as the early Terrill School. To bankroll his aspirations, McDermott recruited his Texas Instruments co-founder Cecil Green as another key donor. However, a devastating campus fire pushed the school to consider a merger with another school.

=== Merger ===
In 1950, Texas Country Day School merged with the Cathedral School for Boys to form St. Mark's School of Texas. TCD headmaster Robert Iglehart headed the merged institution, but representatives of both schools sat on the board of trustees.

The new St. Mark's was and still is a nonsectarian institution, but the religious name reflected Cathedral's influence, and the school continued to employ an Episcopal chaplain. Several St. Mark's headmasters have gone on to run leading Episcopal schools, such as Christopher Berrisford (who took over Los Angeles' Harvard School and New York's Trinity School after the St. Mark's board fired him in 1969) and David Hicks (who became rector of New Hampshire's St. Paul's School in 1983).

In 1964, St. Mark's integrated by admitting the African-American Lee Smith, who graduated in 1965 and became "one of the approximately 30 Black Harvard students in the graduating class of 1969." In 2024, the school reported that 52% of the student body were nonwhite.

==== Academics ====
The school has continued to emphasize academics following the merger. In 1982, Stanford's admissions dean praised St. Mark's as "among the top handful of schools in the country." In 1995, 19 of St. Mark's 67 seniors were National Merit Scholarship semifinalists. In 2024, 25 of St. Mark's 96 seniors received that distinction. The Class of 2025 had a middle 50% SAT range of 1400-1570. Five SM seniors have been named U.S. Presidential Scholars between 2020 and 2024, including two in 2024.

Niche ranked St. Mark's as the nation's best private K-12 school in 2020, 2021, and 2022, as well as #2 in 2019 and 2023 (although St. Mark's is not actually a K-12 school). The school is said to downplay these rankings, as no one school is the best fit for every boy and it is difficult to compare schools in different areas and with different goals.

Since the merger, St. Mark's has heavily emphasized science. Headmaster Ted Whatley called St. Mark's "a Sputnik school founded by industrialists to improve science and math education in Dallas." Green and McDermott donated extensive math and science facilities in the 1960s and 1970s. At least one alumnus, Alan Stern, traces his NASA research to his participation in the St. Mark's planetarium, observatory, and astronomy club. The school redeveloped its science facilities in 2019, when it unveiled the Robert A.M. Stern-designed Winn Science Center. The new facilities also expand an ongoing project with the University of Texas at Austin which allows students to have direct internet access to observatories in Alpine, Texas and rural Peru.

In 2016, a senior was a finalist in the Intel Science Talent Search; he was one of forty finalists nationwide and the only Texan. In 2020, a St. Mark's student finished 5th out of 16,000 participants in the U.S. National Chemistry Olympiad. In 2019, he finished in the top 20. In 2014, a St. Mark's student won his second straight Indian national championship in the International Mathematical Olympiad.

==== Donors and base ====
In contrast to the Terrill School, which was spearheaded by its founder and failed after he died, St. Mark's has been driven by donors, most of whom have actively served on its board of trustees. This was necessitated by both predecessors' precarious financial positions; donor Ralph B. Rogers joked that "two broke schools merged to form one broke school." As D Magazine asserted in 1982, "St. Mark's has its roots in its board of directors, which in turn is rooted in the city's most-established establishment – oil, high technology and, in the old days, cotton." McDermott and Green donated nearly $50 million to TCD and St. Mark's over five decades. In addition to McDermott and Green, notable donors include the families of Harlan Crow, Kenneth Hersh, Lamar Hunt, Tom Hicks, and Elliott Roosevelt.

The school continues to raise large amounts of money from deep-pocketed donors, completing a $112 million fundraising campaign in 2013. In the 2020–21 school year, St. Mark's had a financial endowment of $167.8 million.

In 2018, Architectural Digest named St. Mark's the most beautiful private high school campus in Texas. In October 2019, an EF-3 tornado damaged multiple buildings on campus. Classes quickly resumed, and certain buildings were repaired or rebuilt. However, the school's athletic facilities were badly damaged, prompting the school to redevelop its athletic campus.

=== Headmasters ===
Primary source:

- Menter B. Terrill (1906–1916), Terrill School
- M. B. Bogarte (1916–1931), Terrill School
- Sam "Pop" Davis (1931–1945), Terrill School
- Charles Puckett (1945–1946), Terrill School
- Rev. Charles A. Mason (1946–1948), Cathedral School
- Rev. Alfred L. Alley (1948–1950), Cathedral School
- Kenneth Bouvé (1933–1949), Texas Country Day
- Robert Iglehart (1949–1957), Texas Country Day and St. Mark's
- L. Ralston Thomas (1957–1958), St. Mark's (interim)
- Thomas B. Hartmann (1958–1964)
- Christopher Berrisford (1964–1969)
- John T. Whatley (1969–1982)
- George O. Edwards (1982–1983) (interim)
- David Hicks (1983–1992)
- J. Robert Kohler (1992–1993) (interim)
- Arnold Holtberg (1993–2014)
- David Dini (2014–present)

== Admissions and student body ==
In 2024, St. Mark's reported a 15% acceptance rate, with an 89% admissions yield rate.

In the 2024-25 school year, the school educated 917 boys, with 152 Lower Schoolers (grades 1-4), 337 Middle Schoolers (grades 5-8), and 428 Upper Schoolers (grades 9-12). There are 102 seniors in the Class of 2025.

== Finances ==
=== Endowment and expenses ===
St. Mark's' financial endowment stood at $181.0 million as of June 30, 2024. During that academic year, the school reported an operating budget of $43 million and total assets of $367 million.

The 2022-23 annual fund yielded over $5 million from over 3000 individuals. Donors include 85% of current parents and, for the 15th consecutive year, over half of all living alumni.

=== Tuition and financial aid ===
In the 2024-25 school year, St. Mark's charged students an average tuition of $35,683, ranging from $31,435 for first-graders to $39,355 for twelfth-graders. 14.7% of students were on financial aid, which covered, on average, $21,000. The school's website states that for students with household incomes under $140,000, the average grant is approximately 90% of tuition; separately, approximately half of scholarship students come from families with household incomes over $175,000.

In the 2023-24 school year, the Dallas ABC affiliate reported that St. Mark's charged the third-highest tuition in Dallas, after the Greenhill School and the Episcopal School of Dallas.

== Athletics ==
=== History ===
During the decade of the 1910s, Terrill began to recruit enough athletes (including boarders in a postgraduate year) to successfully compete against much larger high schools as well as teams of college freshmen from Rice, SMU, and TCU. The football team's record during that decade was 67 wins, 2 ties, and one loss (in 1915 to the freshman team from the University of Texas at Austin). Five games between 1912 and 1918 ended with Terrill's football team shutting out their opponents while scoring over 100 points. These undefeated seasons continued through the 1920s, with the teams often being led by well-known coaches. For example, one head coach of that era, Eugene Neely, had starred in football at Dartmouth, despite having lost an arm in a hunting accident at age 14. Another coach, Monroe Sweeney, left Terrill for Major League Baseball, where he umpired 412 games. Another, Pete Cawthon, left Terrill to coach at Austin College, bringing with him 7 of his Terrill players; Cawthon went on to become head football coach for Texas Tech and the Brooklyn Dodgers of the National Football League as well as the athletic director for the University of Alabama. In 1930, the football team was undefeated and unscored upon, and the basketball team won a prep school national championship.

=== Athletic program ===
St. Marks fields 45 Upper School teams in 16 sports. Varsity teams primarily compete with the sixteen other private schools in Texas and Oklahoma comprising the Southwest Preparatory Conference (SPC).

For the 2022-23 school year, St. Mark's won the SPC Directors Cup, an overall measure of conference success. This was the school's 13th Directors Cup in the last 16 years (the school finished 2nd those other 3 years).

Some individual teams have had lengthy periods of success. Lacrosse won 9 conference championships between 2004 and 2013. The swim team won 20 conference championships between 1995 and 2016. The tennis team won 13 conference championships between 1975 and 1990. Water polo won 15 regional championships between 2001 and 2016. Wrestling won 37 conference championships between 1973 and 2015, as well as 13 state championships. The water polo team won 7 Texas state championships between 2014 and 2022.

=== Notable recent athletes ===
Thirteen of the 100 members of the class of 2023 signed to play intercollegiate sports after graduation; since 2018, a total of 68 SM seniors have signed to play college sports. In the 3 years between 2021 and 2023, SM seniors signed letters of intent to play intercollegiate college sports in all of the sports offered at the school, as well as in one sport (squash) that isn't available on campus.

Some well-known alumni were athletes while at St. Mark's. Luke Wilson ‘90 was part of a 1989 record-setting 4x400 relay team (3:21.38); that time was the conference record for over 20 years and a school record until April 2022. Before taking up acting professionally, Tommy Lee Jones ‘65 was an all-conference offensive lineman for Harvard's football team. Boz Scaggs ‘62 was a track and soccer star while at St. Mark's.

Four St. Mark's alumni have played (or are playing) in the 21st century National Football League: Ty Montgomery '11, Sam Acho '07, Emmanuel Acho ('08), and Kalen Thornton ('00). At least 5 Terrill alumni from the 1920s played in the NFL during its first decade: J. B. Andrews (1926), Deck Shelley (1926), Lou Jennings (1923), Charley Malone (1929) and Bill Vaughn (1920).

Multiple alumni have leadership roles in professional sports. Taylor Jenkins '03, is the former head basketball coach of the NBA's Memphis Grizzlies. For MLB's Tampa Bay Rays, Matthew Silverman '94 is President of Baseball Operations, Brian Auld '95 is President, and Barry Newell '05 is vice president for business operations and analytics. David Christoff '10 began studying football data on his own after graduating from MIT and is now Director of Football Analytics for the NFL's Las Vegas Raiders. Clark Hunt '83 is CEO and co-owner of the NFL's Kansas City Chiefs and MLS's FC Dallas, while Ross Perot, Jr. '77 previously owned the NBA's Dallas Mavericks. Of these seven, none played the varsity college sport for which they are known, though Newell played varsity football at Princeton for 3 years, Auld captained Stanford's varsity lacrosse team, and Hunt captained SMU's varsity soccer team. Aside from Jenkins, who interned for the San Antonio Spurs after college, all of these alumni entered sports management from the business world.

As of 2024, Harrison Ingram '21 is the starting forward for college basketball's North Carolina Tar Heels. Earlier, he played two years for Stanford, where he was voted the Pac 12 freshman of the year after leading conference freshmen in scoring, rebounds, assists, and steals. While at St. Mark's, Ingram was evaluated to be the best basketball player in the state and was named to the 24-player McDonald's All-American team. The summer after graduating from SM, Ingram was a member of the United States team that won the 2021 FIBA Under-19 World Cup in Latvia.

The following St. Mark's teams have won Texas state championships.

St. Mark's Texas State Championships
Sport	Year
Crew	1991, 1992, 1993, 1995, 2001, 2002, 2003, 2007, 2008, 2009, 2010, 2013, 2019, 2022
Fencing	1992, 1993, 1995, 1996, 2000, 2001
Football	1918
Ice Hockey	1929
Lacrosse	2013 (Div 1); 2025 (Class A)
Water Polo	1975, 1977, 2009, 2014, 2015, 2016, 2017, 2019, 2021, 2022, 2023, 2024, 2025
Wrestling	1982, 1983, 1994, 1999, 2000, 2002, 2003, 2004, 2006, 2007, 2008, 2009, 2011

== Extracurricular activities ==
As of 2018, St. Mark's recognized 90 extra-curricular clubs and offered 24 fine arts courses.

=== Academic tournaments ===
The debate team has won four national policy debate titles. In addition, the team won the "world championship" at the 2015 International Public Policy Forum.

The 4-student Upper School Quiz Bowl team won the Small School National Academic Quiz Tournaments's (NAQT) National Championship in 2024 and 2025. In both years, the school’s B and C teams finished in the top 20 nationally. Teams from St Mark’s had earlier won that competition in 2017, 2021, and 2022. In 2023, competing against public and private high schools of any size, the 5-student St. Mark's team finished 5th at the PACE National Scholastic Championship in Chicago and 8th at the High School National Championship Tournament in Atlanta.

In 2026, the Middle School Quiz Bowl team won the Middle School NAQT National Championship in Chicago; different SM middle school teams won that national championship in 5 of the 8 years prior to 2026.

For the 4th consecutive year, the 2023-24 SM 4th grade class finished 1st nationally in the most competitive division of the WordMasters Challenge, a series of 3 tests taken annually by 125,000 4th graders around the country. The tests focus on vocabulary, analogies, word usage, and critical thinking. In both 2023 and 2024, an SM 4th grader finished first nationally and a total of 7 other students finished within the top 15 in those 2 years. SM 4th grade classes had also finished 1st nationally in the 4 years between 2015 and 2018.

In 2025, an SM 8th grader won the MathCounts Middle School National Championship in Washington, D.C. A total of 65,000 students participate in this competition each year.

In 2003 and 2019, respectively, an St. Mark's middle schooler won the Scripps National Spelling Bee. In the more recent competition, a 7th grader tied for first when the tournament organizers ran out of words for the students to spell.

In 2025, a team of four SM students placed second in the most competitive Economics Bowl division at the Northwestern Economics Tournament. They also advanced to the international semifinals of the Harvard Pre-Collegiate Economics Challenge, achieving one of the highest average scores in the history of the competition on the written exam portion. That same year, the team finished fourth overall out of 428 teams with 2,508 competitors from 47 countries at the World Economics Cup, finishing second in the United States. Lastly, the team was one of only five globally to receive the Emerging Young Talent Award at the Economics World Cup.

=== School publications ===
All five 2022-23 St. Mark's publications earned Gold Crowns from the Columbia Scholastic Press Association, an honor that goes to six to sixteen publications per category in the country. It was the 20th consecutive for The ReMarker, the newspaper, extending the school's national record for winning this award, which is given to only 6 high school newspapers each year. The Marque, the school's literary magazine, won its 9th Gold Crown in 10 years. In the category of "Special Interest Magazines", St. Mark's publications won two of the six Gold Crowns awarded in 2021-22; these awards were the 4th straight for Focus and the 3rd straight for Scientific Marksman. The Marksmen, the St. Mark's yearbook, won its 8th Gold Crown, overall, but its first since 2013. In 2019, the middle school magazine won its 3rd consecutive Gold Crown, an award given to only 1 or 2 publications in the country.

In 2023, The ReMarker won a National Pacemaker Award, the top award from the National Scholastic Press Association; as of 2023, the newspaper had won this award 15 of the prior 19 years. SM's Scientific Marksman was one of 6 specialty magazines in the country to win a 2023 Pacemaker, while The Marque, was one of 6 literary magazine winners. In 2022, SM's The Focus was one of 2 specialty magazine to win the NSPA's top award, its 4th consecutive Pacemaker. In 2025, the mini-Marque, the middle school's literary magazine, was the only middle school publication in the country to win a Pacemaker.

St. Mark's seniors were named journalist of the year in the state of Texas for eight consecutive years (2013–2020) by the NSPA. In 2019, a senior was named NSPA's national journalist of the year; he became the fourth St. Mark's student in 7 years to rank among the country's top three high school journalists.

For the 15th time in 16 years, 2022 St. Mark's Photography was named "Top Program" in the annual contest sponsored by the Association of Texas Photography Instructors. The contest annually draws about 7000 entries from about 90 schools.

=== Arts ===
In 2021, the Texas Commission on the Arts named a SM student the state poetry champion through its Poetry Out Loud recitation competition. In 2016, the President's Committee on the Arts and Humanities named an St. Mark's senior one of the 5 National Student Poets, selected from over 20,000 applicants.

Between 2015 and 2017, four St. Mark's students won top awards for design from the nationwide YoungArts competition. In addition, seventeen St. Mark's students were finalists in that YoungArts competition between 2009 and 2018.

Since 2010, multiple St. Mark's students have had their films selected for inclusion in the SXSW film festival. One student had his work profiled in Popular Photography magazine.

=== Other ===
In 2014, a St. Mark's student won the national high school chess championship and also became the youngest chess international grandmaster in the Americas. Two other St. Mark's students have earned National Master status while still in high school (in 2012 and 2016).

In 2024, a SM senior won the Princeton Prize in Race Relations, an award that goes to 29 high school students in the country each year.

In 2012, a student earned seventeen of Scouting's Palm Awards in addition to earning the Eagle Scout rank (a feat achieved by two dozen boys in the history of Scouting).

== Notable alumni ==
- Roscoe DeWitt, 1910 (Note: Terrill School) - architect and one of the Monuments Men; 1st student enrolled at Terrill
- Edward Musgrove Dealey, 1910 - president of A.H. Belo; publisher of the Dallas Morning News; 2nd student at Terrill
- Charles J. Stewart, 1914 - first president and chairman, Manufacturers Hanover Trust; captain of Yale's 1917 football team.
- Toddie Lee Wynne, 1915 - investor; co-developer, Six Flags Over Texas, Dallas Cowboys, and 1st private rocket into space
- Lorenzo Sabin, 1917 - vice admiral, US Navy. Recipient of 3 Navy Distinguished Service Medals, the French Legion of Honor, and the British Distinguished Service Order
- Edwin F. Blair, 1919 - attorney, corporate leader, All-American lineman for the undefeated Yale's 1923 football team, "Mr. Yale"
- Ralph Jester, 1919 - Hollywood costume designer. Twice nominated for an Academy Award, including for The Ten Commandments in 1956
- Stuart P. Wright, 1921 - major general, US Air Force. Recipient of the Legion of Merit, Distinguished Flying Cross, Bronze Star Medal and Air Medal. Athletic Hall of Honor, University of Texas for track, basketball, and football
- Lou Jennings, 1923 - offensive and defensive lineman for the NFL's Providence Steam Rollers and Portsmouth Spartans; professional wrestler
- Jerry Bywaters, 1924 - artist and critic. Director, Dallas Museum of Fine Arts. Professor, Southern Methodist University.
- John Astin Perkins, 1924 - architect and interior designer
- Deck Shelley, 1925 - running back for the NFL's Portsmouth Spartans, Green Bay Packers, and Chicago Cardinals
- J.B. Andrews, 1926 - quarterback, running back, and linebacker for the NFL's St. Louis Gunners
- C.F. "Shorty" Key, 1927 - fullback for the NWFL's Des Moines Comets and the CAFL's Fresno Wine Crushers; played for 5 different college teams using 4 different names; professional wrestler
- Charley Malone, 1929 - Pro Bowl wide receiver for the NFL's Washington Redskins
- Alan Lomax, 1930 (Note: Alumnus, but graduated from different high school.) - ethnomusicologist, musician, political activist, winner of the National Medal of Arts
- Wiley T. Buchanan, Jr., 1931 - Chief of Protocol of the United States and the U.S. Ambassador to Luxembourg and Austria
- James F. Chambers Jr., 1931 - newspaperman; publisher and chairman of the board, Dallas Times Herald
- Lawrence Marcus, 1934 - Executive Vice President of Neiman Marcus
- Harry W. Bass, Jr., 1943 (Note: Texas Country Day) - in oil and gas exploration; developer of Vail, Aspen, and Beaver Creek ski resorts; coin collector
- Henry Martin, 1944 - illustrator; New Yorker cartoonist
- Richard Bass, 1946 - in oil and gas exploration; owner of Snowbird ski resort; climber of Seven Summits; rancher
- Stanley J. Seeger, 1947 - art collector
- Michael Rudman, 1956 - theatre director
- John Maxson, 1958 - sound engineer; winner, Emmy Award; co-founder, Showco and Vari*Lite
- Jim Adler, 1960 - attorney; "the Texas Hammer"
- Ray Lee Hunt, 1961 - in oil and gas exploration; Chair of Hunt Consolidated, Inc.
- Steve Miller, 1961 - musician
- Lewis MacAdams, 1962 - poet, journalist, activist, and filmmaker
- Boz Scaggs, 1962 - musician
- Boomer Castleman, 1963 - musician
- Michael R. Levy, 1964 - founder and publisher of Texas Monthly
- John Nance, 1964 - writer, pilot, aviation analyst, attorney
- Robert Hoffman, 1965 - owner of Coca-Cola Bottling Group (Southwest); co-founder of National Lampoon; art collector
- Tommy Lee Jones, 1965 - Academy Award-winning actor; rancher; 1st team All-Ivy League guard on Harvard's football team in 1968; polo player
- William Hootkins, 1966 - stage and character actor
- Mike Estep, 1967 - professional tennis player and coach
- David Laney, 1967 - attorney, Amtrak chair, Republican fundraiser
- Charles Nearburg, 1968 - in oil and gas exploration; world-record-setting race car driver
- John Steakley, 1969 - science fiction novelist; author of Armor and Vampire$
- Jeffrey Swann, 1969 - classical pianist; faculty at New York University
- Robert Decherd, 1969 - CEO and President of A.H. Belo, a media conglomerate that includes the Dallas Morning News
- Steven D. Wolens, 1969 - attorney; Texas state representative
- Stephen Arnold, 1971 - Emmy-winning composer, writer of jingles, and developer of sonic branding
- Mark D. Jordan, 1971 - Andrew Mellon Professor, Harvard Divinity School; scholar of gender, sexuality, and theology
- Ivan Stang, 1971 - co-founder of Church of the Subgenius; author of High Weirdness by Mail
- George Bayoud, 1973 - real estate developer; former Texas Secretary of State
- Robert M. Edsel, 1975 - in oil and gas exploration; historical activist; author of Monuments Men and Rescuing Da Vinci
- David M. Lutken, 1975 - musician, actor, playwright, director; Woody Guthrie performer and interpreter
- Marc Stanley, 1975 - attorney; U.S. Ambassador to Argentina
- Alan Stern, 1975 - planetary scientist; principal investigator for NASA's New Horizons project
- Michael Weiss, 1976 - jazz pianist, composer
- fi:Markus Nummi, 1977 - Finnish film director, screenwriter, poet, novelist
- H. Ross Perot, Jr., 1977 - real estate developer
- Mark Stern, 1977 - mathematician; professor at Duke University
- Kerry Sulkowicz, 1977 - business consultant, advisor, psychiatrist
- Randall Zisk, 1977 - television producer and director, Monk, Lois and Clark, the Mentalist
- Wallace L. Hall, 1978 - in oil and gas exploration; outspoken member of the University of Texas Board of Regents
- Paul Rice, 1978 - social entrepreneur; President and CEO of Fair Trade USA
- Jeff Turpin, 1978 - in oil and gas exploration; in tennis, college All American and former Grand Prix Tour professional
- Kurt Eichenwald, 1979 - journalist, senior editor, Newsweek, author, The Informant
- Frank Rolfe, 1979 - one of the country's largest owners of mobile home parks. Co-owner, Mobile Home University
- Kenneth A. Hersh, 1981 - CEO, NGP Energy Capital Management. CEO, George W. Bush Presidential Center
- Jeff Miller, 1982 - President, CEO, and Chairman of the Board, Halliburton Corporation; former professional rodeo roper
- Andrew Wilson, 1982 - actor
- David Hudgins, 1983 - television writer and producer, Everwood, Friday Night Lights, Parenthood
- Grant Dorfman, 1983 – Texas Business Court Judge and former Deputy First Assistant to the Texas Attorney General
- Clark Hunt, 1983 - co-owner and chairman of the NFL's Kansas City Chiefs and Major League Soccer's FC Dallas; former captain and Academic All American, SMU varsity soccer
- Craig Zisk, 1983 - television and film producer and director, Weeds, The Larry Sanders Show, The English Patient
- Victor Vescovo, 1984 - underwater explorer, pilot, mountain climber, private equity investor
- Steve Jurvetson, 1985 - venture capitalist; former managing director of Draper Fisher Jurvetson
- Charles Olivier, 1987 - Emmy-winning writer and producer
- Owen Wilson, 1987 - actor, writer, producer
- Paul Wylie, 1987 - figure skater; Olympic silver medalist
- Doug Mankoff, 1988 - film producer
- Rhett Miller, 1989 - musician; songwriter; lead singer of the Old 97's
- Luke Wilson, 1990 - actor
- Ali Rowghani, 1991 - managing partner, YC Continuity at Y Combinator; former chief financial officer at Pixar and former chief operating officer at Twitter
- Sam Dealey, 1992 - journalist and media consultant; former Editor in Chief of the Washington Times
- Matthew Silverman, 1994 - President of Baseball Operations, Tampa Bay Rays
- Brian Auld, 1995 - President, Tampa Bay Rays
- Richard B. Spencer, 1997 - neo-nazi; proponent of the alt-right; President, National Policy Institute
- Graeme Wood, 1997 - political journalist; contributing editor at The Atlantic; lecturer at Yale
- Evan Daugherty, 2000 - screenwriter, Divergent, Snow White and the Huntsman, Teenage Mutant Ninja Turtles
- Kalen Thornton, 2000 - marketing director for Nike; former linebacker for the Dallas Cowboys
- Ned Price, 2001 - political consultant and academic administrator; former U.S. intelligence agent and diplomat
- Miles Fisher, 2001 - actor
- Taylor Jenkins, 2003 - head basketball coach for the NBA's Milwaukee Bucks; former head basketball coach for the Memphis Grizzlies
- Sam Acho, 2007 - ESPN analyst, author, former NFL linebacker
- Emmanuel Acho, 2008 - Fox Sports analyst, social commentator, television host, former NFL linebacker.
- Ty Montgomery, 2011 - wide receiver, running back, and kickoff returner for the NFL's New Orleans Saints
- Harrison Ingram, 2021 - professional basketball player for the NBA’s San Antonio Spurs
