= J. B. Andrews =

American football player and basketball coach (1907–1995)

J.B. "Jaby" Andrews
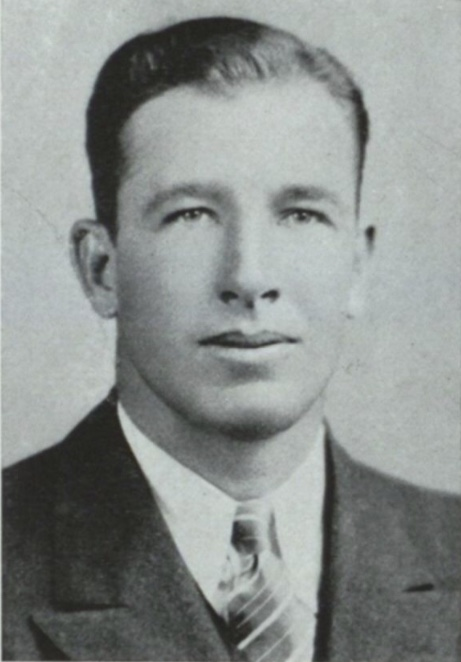
- Andrews as head basketball coach at UTEP

No. 66
- Positions: Wingback, defensive back

Personal information
- Born: January 7, 1907; Dallas, Texas, U.S.
- Died: November 15, 1995 (aged 88); Louisville, Kentucky, U.S.
- Listed weight: 208 lb (94 kg)

Career information
- High school: St. Marks (TX); Dallas (TX)
- College: Texas-El Paso

Career history
- St. Louis Gunners (1934); Louisville Tanks (1936–1938)

Career statistics
- Games played: 2
- Stats at Pro Football Reference

James B. Andrews (January 7, 1907 – November 15, 1995) was an American football player and college basketball coach in the 1930s.

== Early life ==
Andrews was born January 7, 1907, and grew up in Bryan, Texas. He attended high school in Bryan and at Dallas Academy before being recruited to play football for the Terrill School, the forerunner to St. Mark's School of Texas.

== Football career ==
Between 1929 and 1932, Andrews played varsity football for the Texas College of Mines (now known as the University of Texas, El Paso). A 1929 article from the El Paso Times described a homecoming victory: "As for Andrews, this fellow who disdained to wear a headgear in the first half was in almost every play. He broke up play after play behind the Aggie line and hurried many Aggies for losses."

In 1934, Andrews played quarterback, tailback, and linebacker for the St. Louis Gunners of the National Football League. For three years (1936–38), he played for the Louisville Tanks. In 1937, he also worked as an assistant coach for the Louisville team.
