= John Maxson =

Audio and recording engineer (1940–2016)

John DeGolyer (Jack) Maxson (1940–2016) was one of the most noted audio and recording engineers of his generation.

== Professional ==
Maxson is best known for co-creating Showco in his garage in 1970. Led by Maxson, Jack Calmes, and Rusty Brutsche, Showco would become one of the world's premier live sound providers. The company's client list included most major rock bands of the era, including the Rolling Stones, David Bowie, Sir Paul McCartney, Three Dog Night, Led Zeppelin, Steppenwolf, and James Taylor. In 2000, Showco was purchased by and merged with a competitor, Lititz (now known as Clair Global).

As described by Brutsche, Showco's success was predicated on the problem that rock concerts faced: "most public address systems were built for the amplification of a single announcer over crowd noise. The dynamics of live music and the power required to generate the sounds we hear at concerts today were almost unthinkable at that time."

Maxson later co-founded Vari*Lite, which was one of the first automated changeable color lighting systems for the stage. Through his co-ownership of that company, Maxson won Primetime Emmy Awards for technical achievement in 1991, 1994 and 2001.

Prior to developing Showco, Maxson had been president of the Delta Recording Company and Spot Productions.

== Personal ==
Maxson was the eldest child of John and Virginia DeGolyer Maxson. A grandfather was Everett Lee DeGolyer. An uncle was George C. McGhee. Maxson graduated from the St. Mark's School of Texas in 1958 and attended the University of Oklahoma. Maxson was married to Margaret Paulson and then to Sally Stocker. He had one daughter, Margaret DeGolyer (Peggy) Maxson. While he is best known for his work in the development of the modern rock concert, his own preference was for classical music, about which he had an encyclopedic knowledge. He was active philanthropically with the Museum of the American Railroad in Frisco, Texas and the Dallas Arboretum.
