= Kalen Thornton =

American football player (born 1982)

No. 53
- Position: Outside linebacker

Personal information
- Born: May 12, 1982 (age 44); Dallas, Texas
- Listed height: 6 ft 3 in (1.91 m)
- Listed weight: 245 lb (111 kg)

Career information
- High school: St. Mark's School of Texas (Dallas)
- College: Texas
- NFL draft: 2004: undrafted

Career history
- Dallas Cowboys (2004–2005)

Awards and highlights
- 3× second-team Academic All-Big 12 (2001, 2002, 2003)

Career NFL statistics
- Games played: 16
- Stats at Pro Football Reference

Kalen Bruce Thornton (born May 12, 1982, in Dallas, Texas) is an American former professional football player who was a linebacker for the Dallas Cowboys of the National Football League (NFL). He played college football for the Texas Longhorns.

== Early life ==
Thornton attended St. Mark's School of Texas. He played 2 years at fullback. As a senior, he was converted into a linebacker and also played. He recorded 86 tackles, 16 sacks, 4 fumble recoveries, 2 forced fumbles and 24 carries for 232 yards. During his three seasons, he helped the team achieve a 26–3 record and win a league title.

He also practiced basketball and track

== College career ==
Thornton accepted a football scholarship from the University of Texas at Austin. As a true freshman, he started 9 games at defensive end, collecting 32 tackles (17 solo), 3.5 sacks (tied for fifth among freshman in school history), 8 tackles for loss (tied for fifth among freshman in school history) and 20 quarterback pressures. As a sophomore, he started 11 games, making 44 tackles (11 for loss), 4 sacks, 20 quarterback pressures (led the team) and one forced fumble. He suffered a knee injury in the fifth game against the University of Oklahoma.

As a junior, he regained his starter position after coming back from offseason knee surgery, tallying 28 tackles, 2.5 sacks, 5 tackles for loss, 14 quarterback pressures and a blocked extra point in 10 games. He also suffered a sprained ankle midway through the season. As a senior, he missed spring practice recovering from reconstructive surgery on his right knee. He posted 51 tackles (9 for loss), 4 sacks, 21 quarterback pressures and 6 passes defensed. He had 10 tackles in the 2003 Holiday Bowl.

He finished his college career as a four-year starter, starting 35 out of 46 games (including bowl games), posting 155 tackles (33 for loss), 14 sacks and 75 quarterback pressures.

== Professional career ==
Thornton was signed as an undrafted free agent by the Dallas Cowboys after the 2004 NFL draft, dropping because of his knee injury history. As a rookie, he was converted into an outside linebacker, posting 8 defensive tackles, one quarterback pressure and 13 special teams tackles (sixth on the team).

In 2005, he was expected to compete for the starting job against rookie DeMarcus Ware, but he suffered a left knee injury in training camp that required career-ending microfracture surgery and was placed on the injured reserve list. On May 31, 2006, he was waived after not been able to recover from his previous knee injury.

== Personal life ==
Following his professional football career, Thornton worked for 3 years in private wealth management for Morgan Stanley Smith Barney. In 2009, he matriculated at Stanford Graduate School of Business. Since 2011, he has worked as a marketing director at Nike.

His father Bruce Thornton also played for the Dallas Cowboys, while his brother Kyle played for Texas and then for University of North Alabama. His youngest brother Kenton, also starred for St. Mark's before doing a post-graduate year at Blair Academy, where he was prep offensive player of the year in New Jersey. He then played for the University of North Carolina at Chapel Hill before transferring to the University of North Alabama.

== See also ==
- Notable alumni of St. Mark's School of Texas
