= Monroe Sweeney =

American baseball umpire (1892–1950)

- Born: James Monroe Sweeney; December 29, 1892; Paris, Kentucky, U.S.
- Died: January 29, 1950 (aged 57); Taylor, Texas, U.S.
- Resting place: Taylor City Cemetery, Taylor, Texas
- Occupation: Umpire
- Years active: 1924-1926
- Employer: National League

James Monroe Sweeney (December 29, 1892 – January 29, 1950) was an American professional baseball umpire.

Sweeney began umpiring in the Texas League in from 1922 to 1923. He was the head football coach for one year, 1923, at Terrill School for Boys in Dallas, Texas, a predecessor to St. Mark's School of Texas. He then moved to the National League, where he worked from 1924 to 1926. In that time, he umpired 412 National League games. Following the 1926 season, Sweeney umpired in the Pacific Coast League, Western League, and International League until 1935. He died of a heart attack on January 20, 1950, in Taylor, Texas.
