= Vampires (1998 film) =

Horror film by John Carpenter

- Theatrical release poster
- Directed by: John Carpenter
- Screenplay by: Don Jakoby
- Based on: Vampires by John Steakley
- Produced by: Sandy King
- Starring: James Woods; Daniel Baldwin; Sheryl Lee; Thomas Ian Griffith; Maximilian Schell; Tim Guinee
- Cinematography: Gary B. Kibbe
- Edited by: Edward A. Warschilka
- Music by: John Carpenter
- Production companies: Film Office; JVC Entertainment Networks; Largo Entertainment; Spooky Tooth Productions; Storm King Productions
- Distributed by: Columbia Pictures (through Sony Pictures Releasing; select territories); Summit Entertainment (International)
- Release date: October 30, 1998
- Running time: 108 minutes
- Country: United States
- Language: English
- Budget: $20 million
- Box office: $20.3 million (domestic)

Vampires (also known as John Carpenter's Vampires) is a 1998 American horror-action film directed and scored by John Carpenter and starring James Woods. It was adapted from the novel Vampires by John Steakley.

Woods stars as Jack Crow, the leader of a team of vampire hunters. After his parents were murdered by vampires, Crow was raised by the Catholic Church to become their "master slayer." The plot is centered on Crow's efforts to prevent a centuries-old cross from falling into the hands of Jan Valek (a reference to Valac, played by Thomas Ian Griffith), the first and most powerful of all vampires. The film also stars Daniel Baldwin as Tony Montoya, Crow's best friend and fellow hunter; Sheryl Lee as Katrina, a prostitute who has a psychic link to Valek after being bitten; Tim Guinee as Father Adam Guiteau; and Maximilian Schell as Cardinal Alba.

The film was followed by two direct-to-video sequels, Vampires: Los Muertos (2002) and Vampires: The Turning (2005).

== Plot ==
Jack Crow leads his team of Vatican-sponsored vampire hunters in a daylight raid on an abandoned house in New Mexico. Finding a "nest" of vampires, the team subdue the creatures with gunfire, pikes, and wooden stakes, using a modified crossbow attached to a mechanical winch to pull them outside, where they are incinerated by sunlight. Despite disposing of nine basic vampire "goons," Jack is concerned about not having found the nest's "master" — an older and more powerful vampire.

While the team drunkenly celebrates with prostitutes at the local Sun God Motel, the master vampire, Jan Valek, arrives and bites one of the prostitutes, Katrina, initiating her transformation into a vampire. He swiftly murders the hunters, with only Crow and his trusted lieutenant, Tony Montoya, escaping alive with Katrina. Disturbed that Valek recognized him by name, Crow orders Montoya to lie low with Katrina, hoping to use her growing psychic link with Valek to track him down.

After burying the dead of his team and burning down the motel, Crow reports to his superior, Cardinal Alba, who confirms that Valek was a disgraced priest who led a rebellion against the church, leading to his execution and transformation into the first vampire. Valek has already killed another group of slayers in Germany, and Alba instructs Crow to form a new team, accompanied by archivist Father Adam Guiteau. Suspecting that his team was betrayed, Crow interrogates Guiteau and dispels his heroic notions of vampire hunting, showing him a map of vampire activity that indicates the vampires are searching the Southwest for an unknown object.

Guarding Katrina at a hotel, Montoya explains the changes that Katrina is experiencing. Horrified, she attempts suicide and bites Montoya when he rescues her, which he hides from Crow and Guiteau when they arrive. Crow decides to pursue Valek without gathering a new team, and Katrina is linked with Valek when he questions and kills a priest. Sensing Guiteau is hiding something, Crow threatens him, recounting that he killed his own father for being bitten by a vampire and killing Jack's mother in front of him. Guiteau reveals that Valek is seeking an ancient relic, the Black Cross of Béziers, and Crow welcomes him to the team as his new slayer.

Using Katrina's psychic link, Jack, Montoya, and Guiteau learn that Valek has roused seven additional masters. They follow the vampires to a Spanish mission, where Valek has slaughtered the friars and seized the cross. Guiteau realizes that Valek plans to complete his own exorcism, making him immune to sunlight and virtually unstoppable. Searching a nearby abandoned town, they suspect at least fifteen new goons have been transformed. Guiteau volunteers as bait for the masters, allowing Jack to harpoon them and Montoya to drag them into the sunlight. While they manage to kill most of his lieutenants, Valek and his undead army overwhelm them at sundown; Crow is captured, Guiteau takes cover, and Montoya flees with Katrina, only for her to fully transform and bite Montoya on the neck before joining Valek.

Cardinal Alba reveals himself as Valek's ally; having grown to fear death, he has agreed to help Valek re-create the original ritual in exchange for becoming a vampire himself. The ritual requires the participation of a priest and the blood and crucifixion of a "crusader" — Jack. Guiteau kills Alba before he can complete the ritual and holds off the vampire horde by threatening to kill himself, which would leave Valek without a priest. Montoya and Guiteau rescue Crow as the sun rises, and Crow confronts Valek, impaling him with the Béziers Cross before destroying him with sunlight.

Guiteau and Crow prepare to slay Montoya and Katrina, knowing their transformations are irreversible. However, to repay Montoya's two days of loyalty after being bitten, Crow grants them a two-day head start. As Montoya and Katrina depart, Jack and Guiteau head off to kill the remaining vampires.

== Cast ==
- James Woods as John "Jack" Crow
- Daniel Baldwin as Tony Montoya
- Sheryl Lee as Katrina
- Tim Guinee as Father Adam “Padre” Guiteau
- Thomas Ian Griffith as Jan Valek
- Maximilian Schell as Cardinal Alba
- Mark Boone Junior as Catlin
- Gregory Sierra as Father Giovanni
- Cary-Hiroyuki Tagawa as David Deyo
- Thomas Rosales, Jr. as Ortega
- Henry Kingi as Anthony
- David Rowden as Bambi
- Clarke Coleman as Davis
- Chad Stahelski as Male Master
- Marjean Holden as Female Master

== Production ==
Largo Entertainment bought the rights to John Steakley's novel in 1992 and planned on turning the film into the studio's next big project. Although Carpenter, alongside Sam Raimi, Peter Jackson, and Ron Underwood, had all been considered, Russell Mulcahy was the first to be the attached director. Dolph Lundgren had been cast in the lead role of Jack Crow, and it was reported that Willem Dafoe was being eyed for a secondary role, likely the role of antagonist vampire Valek. Many proposed drafts for the film existed, including one that took place entirely at The Vatican and featured a vampirized Pope as the villain, and another that took place in a distant high-tech future in which vampires were commonplace and vampire hunters were as abundant as police officers. The film was slated for a summer 1996 release date with a budget of $50 million to $60 million, but conflicts between Mulcahy and the studio forced him to leave the project before filming began, taking Lundgren with him. The two would immediately begin working on Silent Trigger, which borrowed elements from the unused scripts for Vampires.

Shortly after finishing work on Escape from L.A., John Carpenter was thinking about quitting filmmaking, because "it stopped being fun." Largo Entertainment approached him with a project called Vampires, an adaptation of the novel of the same name by John Steakley. Largo gave him two screenplays; one by Don Jakoby and one by Dan Mazur. Carpenter read both screenplays and the novel, and he saw the potential for a film he been interested in making. "I went into my office and thought, 'It's going to be set in the American Southwest, and it's a western — Howard Hawks.'" Carpenter had always wanted to make a film that experimented with mixing the horror and western genres and felt Vampires was perfect for him. "The story is set up like a western. It's about killers for hire. They're a western cliché. In this movie they’re paid to kill vampires." In terms of tone and look, Carpenter felt that his film was "a little more like The Wild Bunch than Hawks in its style, but the feelings and the whole ending scene is a kind of replay on Red River."

The film was originally set to be made with a budget $60 million but was slashed down to $20 million at the last minute. To accommodate the sudden budgetary concerns, he wrote his own screenplay, taking elements from the Jakoby and Mazur scripts, the book, and some of his own ideas, alongside writer and frequent collaborator Michael De Luca. For this film, Carpenter wanted to get away from the stereotype of gothic vampires as he said in an interview, "My vampires are savage creatures. There isn't a second of brooding loneliness in their existence. They're too busy ripping and tearing humans apart."

=== Casting ===
Carpenter was looking for someone unique to play the character of Jack Crow and was actively avoiding "just another musclebound meathead," eventually settling for James Woods. He had considered Clint Eastwood, Kurt Russell, Bill Paxton, Al Pacino, Joe Pesci, and R. Lee Ermey for the role, but all of those actors either declined the role or couldn't sign on due to scheduling conflicts. Ermey's casting was rejected by the studio, who believed he did not hold the star power to front a blockbuster. Carpenter cast Woods as Jack Crow because he wanted "the vampire slayer to be as savage as the prey he's after, a guy who's just as menacing as the vampires. James Woods is the kind of guy you'd believe could and would chew off the leg of a vampire." Woods was interested in doing the film because he had never been offered a horror film before and wanted to try something new. Contrary to his reputation, Carpenter didn't find the actor difficult to work with because "we had a deal. He would give me one take as it's written and I would let him improvise.... Many of his improvisations were brilliant. When I needed him to be more focused and disciplined, I had the take from the script that was straighter."

Alec Baldwin, a big fan of Carpenter's work, had been cast to play Montoya but quickly dropped out and recommended the role to his brother Daniel. Carpenter had not seen any of Daniel Baldwin's work and had the actor read for him. He had seen Sheryl Lee on Twin Peaks and cast her based on her work on the show. Carpenter's wife and the film's producer, Sandy King, cast Thomas Ian Griffith because she and the director wanted "someone who looks formidable, but is also alluring. There always has to be something alluring about the evil nature of the vampire." Dolph Lundgren was also approached about returning as Valek instead of Jack Crow, but he was not interested in playing the villain and declined.

=== Filming ===
Principal photography began in June 1997 in New Mexico and concluded on August 4, 1997. Midway through production, Carpenter left the film due to creative interference, and special make-up effects artist Greg Nicotero took over for a few days until Carpenter was persuaded back. In the credits, the film bears a 1997 copyright year rather than a 1998 copyright year, presumably because post-production work had been completed prior to 1998.

=== Post-production ===
The MPAA took issue with the film's over-the-top violence, threatening to give it an NC-17 rating unless some of the gore was cut. Ultimately, about 20 seconds of footage was cut from the film. King said, "We satisfied the ratings board by just cutting short of a few things that went into really gruesome stuff."

== Reception ==
=== Box office ===
The film opened at #1 ahead of Pleasantville, grossing $9.4 million in its opening weekend. It dropped to number #8 in its second weekend, grossing $4 million. The film grossed $20,308,772 in the United States on a $20 million budget. Although worldwide numbers are not official, Carpenter stated the film was a massive success overseas, particularly in Japan, and pulled in well over its $20 million budget. It later went on to pull in a further $42 million on home video rental and purchase sales. Vampires was Carpenter's only financially successful film of the 1990s, and to date, it is the last financially successful film that John Carpenter has directed.

=== Critical response ===
The film was released to varied critical reviews, appearing on both best-of-the-year and worst-of-the-year lists. Positive reviews were based on the film's acting, direction, and visual style, while negative reviews felt the film lacked a coherent plot or likable characters. On Rotten Tomatoes, Vampires holds a 44% rating based on 54 reviews. The site's consensus was "Nothing but one showdown after another." On Metacritic, the film has a score of 42% based on reviews from 19 critics, indicating "mixed or average reviews". Audiences polled by CinemaScore gave the film an average grade of "D+" on an A+-to-F scale.

Liam Lacey of The Globe and Mail called it "crude, rude, nasty fun". Robert Gonsalves of efilmcritic.com gave the film four out of five stars, calling Vampires "grungy, disreputable fun — the kind of blood-and-tequila western that can only be made nowadays when disguised as a horror movie." Sean Axmaker of Stream On Demand gave the film 3.5 stars out of four, calling it "Carpenter in his prime form," giving particular points to its worldbuilding and acting. Negative reviews such as The New York Times' Lawrence Van Gelder's said it was "ridiculous without being awful enough to be hilarious." Michael Dequina of The Movie Report was also unimpressed, giving the film 1.5 stars out of five, saying "there's no real plot," further believing the film featured "some of the most unlikable characters in recent memory". Paul Tatara of CNN gave the film a particularly hostile review, lambasting Carpenter as a filmmaker and finishing his review by saying "as foul as it is, I'd argue that the main reason kids shouldn't see 'John Carpenter's Vampires' is because it might stunt their emotional and creative development."

Other critics saw the film as mediocre at best. Roger Ebert gave the film two-and-a-half stars out of four and noted that it "has a certain mordant humor and charm," but was ultimately "not scary, and the plot is just one gory showdown after another." Marc Savlov of the Austin Chronicle gave the film three stars out of five, stating he enjoyed its cinematography, which he described as "a comic book brought to life," but further noted that the film takes itself far too seriously and suggests it may have worked better as a dark comedy. James Berardinelli gave the film two-and-a-half stars out of four, stating "Vampires is decent enough, but it's unlikely anybody will remember this film in the following years, or perhaps even in following weeks."

In one of Vampires's most positive reviews, Gene Siskel awarded the film four out of four stars, calling it "a high-action homage to westerns and classic horror that actually has a unique story and masterful cinematography" and "a film that should put John Carpenter back on the map as a horror director and a film director in general." Siskel also expressed his fondness for the fact that the film starred an all-adult cast without any teenagers and portrayed both vampires and vampire hunters in an original way. At the end of the year, he named James Woods the pick for his "Best Actor" suggestion to the Oscars.

John Steakley, the author of the source novel, liked the film but said it contained much of his dialogue while having none of his plot.

=== Accolades ===
According to Carpenter, Gary Kibbe was shortlisted for the Best Cinematography at the 71st Academy Awards.

Award	Category	Recipients	Result
25th Saturn Awards	Best Actor	James Woods	Won
25th Saturn Awards	Best Make-Up		Won
25th Saturn Awards	Best Music	John Carpenter	Won
25th Saturn Awards	Best Horror Film	Vampires	Nominated
25th Saturn Awards	Best Supporting Actress	Sheryl Lee	Nominated
Bram Stoker Award	Other Media	John Carpenter	Nominated
International Horror Guild Award	Best Movie	Vampires	Nominated
1998 Stinkers Bad Movie Awards	Worst Supporting Actor	Daniel Baldwin	Won

== See also ==
- Vampire film
