= Michael R. Levy =

American magazine publisher

Michael R. "Mike" Levy (born May 17, 1946) is the founder of Texas Monthly magazine, and was publisher until retirement in August 2008.

A native of Dallas, Levy's father was a plumber. Levy once drove a taxi, and also worked as a jailer at the Dallas County Jail. He is a graduate of St. Mark's School of Texas, the University of Pennsylvania, and the University of Texas School of Law.

Levy founded Texas Monthly in 1973, when he was 27 years old. Currently read by over two million people each month, the magazine provides commentary on all things Texan.

Levy has served on multiple boards, including the University of Texas M. D. Anderson Cancer Center, Children's Defense Fund of Texas, St. Mark's School of Texas, and St. Stephen's Episcopal School, Austin, Texas. He has won awards from such institutions as the Susan G. Komen for the Cure, Esquire Magazine, Planned Parenthood, and St. Mark's.

== See also ==
- Notable alumni of St. Mark's School of Texas
