= David Laney =

American businessman

Personal details
- Born: January 19, 1949 (age 76)
- Political party: Republican
- Education: Stanford University (BA); Southern Methodist University (JD)

David M. Laney (born January 19, 1949, in Dallas, Texas) is an attorney, an administrator of transportation programs, and a Republican supporter and fundraiser.

== Early life and education ==
Laney grew up in Dallas, Texas, where he graduated from St. Mark's School of Texas in 1967. He then graduated from Stanford University and the law school at Southern Methodist University.

== Career ==
=== Legal ===
Laney practiced at the law firm of Jenkens & Gilchrist from 1977 to 2003 and was managing partner of that firm from 1990 to 2002. Between 2003 and 2007, he was a partner with the law firm of Jackson Walker LLP in Dallas, where he practiced in the area of corporate and financial law.

=== Transportation administration ===
Laney was chair of Amtrak's board of directors from 2003 to 2007. He was previously the chairman of the Texas Transportation Commission.

=== Political and public involvement ===
Laney became a campaign "Pioneer" for George W. Bush by raising over $100,000 for his 2000 presidential campaign. He also made significant donations to Republican campaigns in the 2008 elections.

Texas Governor William Clements appointed Laney to the Texas Finance Commission from 1989 to 1995. That committee was responsible for regulatory oversight of state chartered banking and thrift institutions. He served as Governor Bush's Texas Commissioner of Transportation (Chair of the Texas Transportation Commission) from 1995 to 2001.

In 2002, Mr. Laney was nominated by President George W. Bush to the board of directors of Amtrak and confirmed by the U.S. Senate for a five-year term. In 2007, he completed his term as chairman of Amtrak's board of directors.

=== Volunteer efforts and honors ===
In 2010, Laney was inducted into the Texas Transportation Hall of Honor.

Laney served on the board of trustees at Stanford University from 1998 to 2003. He currently serves on the board of Matador Resources.
