= John Astin Perkins =

American architect

John Astin Perkins (1907-1999) was an interior designer and architect based in Dallas, Texas. He helped create the “Dallas look” though his prominent commissions and his “fearless use of color and highbrow taste.”

== Early life ==
Perkins was born in McKinney, Texas, to Frank Dudley Perkins and Daisy Astin Perkins. He had one sister, Florence.

In 1924, Perkins graduated from Dallas’ Terrill Preparatory School, a forerunner of St. Mark's School of Texas. He received an architecture degree from Yale University, winning Yale’s Beaux-Arts award in 1928. He earned an additional architecture degree from the University of Texas at Austin in 1931. He then spent two years studying interior design at the New York School of Fine and Applied Arts (later known as Parsons School of Design), receiving his diploma in 1933.

== Private practice ==
Perkins worked privately as a designer and architect for over 60 years. He did projects around the world, but most of his effort was focused on Dallas.

According to a 2008 article in D Magazine, Perkins was largely responsible for a now-classic Dallas look that was marked by the use of bright color and patterns, traditional (but not staid) furniture, and highly accessorized rooms filled with antiques. Many of his designs were featured in Town & Country, House and Garden, and House Beautiful. During his lifetime, his projects appeared in Architectural Digest more times than that of any other designer.

Perkins’ many clients included the families of Perry Richardson Bass, James Ling, Clint Murchison, and Ross Perot, as well as a wide variety of country clubs, schools, hotels, and office buildings.

== Personal life ==
One early family conflict developed at the time of his high school graduation. Perkins announced to his parents that he planned to study architecture on the east coast. His father had, himself, been the captain of Texas A&M's first football team and had become a very successful investor in farming, livestock, and real estate. The father apparently, thought his son's plan was ridiculous and refused to pay the tuition. Instead, in the hopes of "toughening up" his artistically-inclined son, the father insisted that Perkins spend the summer roofing in the Dallas heat. Over the objection of his parents, Perkins then cashed out an inheritance from his uncle and paid his own tuition to study architecture at Yale.

== Legacy ==
Perkins’ Drawings, Photographic Materials, Objects, and Papers, 1924-1994, are in the Alexander Architectural Library at the University of Texas, Austin.
