= Kenneth Hersh =

American businessman and financier (born 1963)

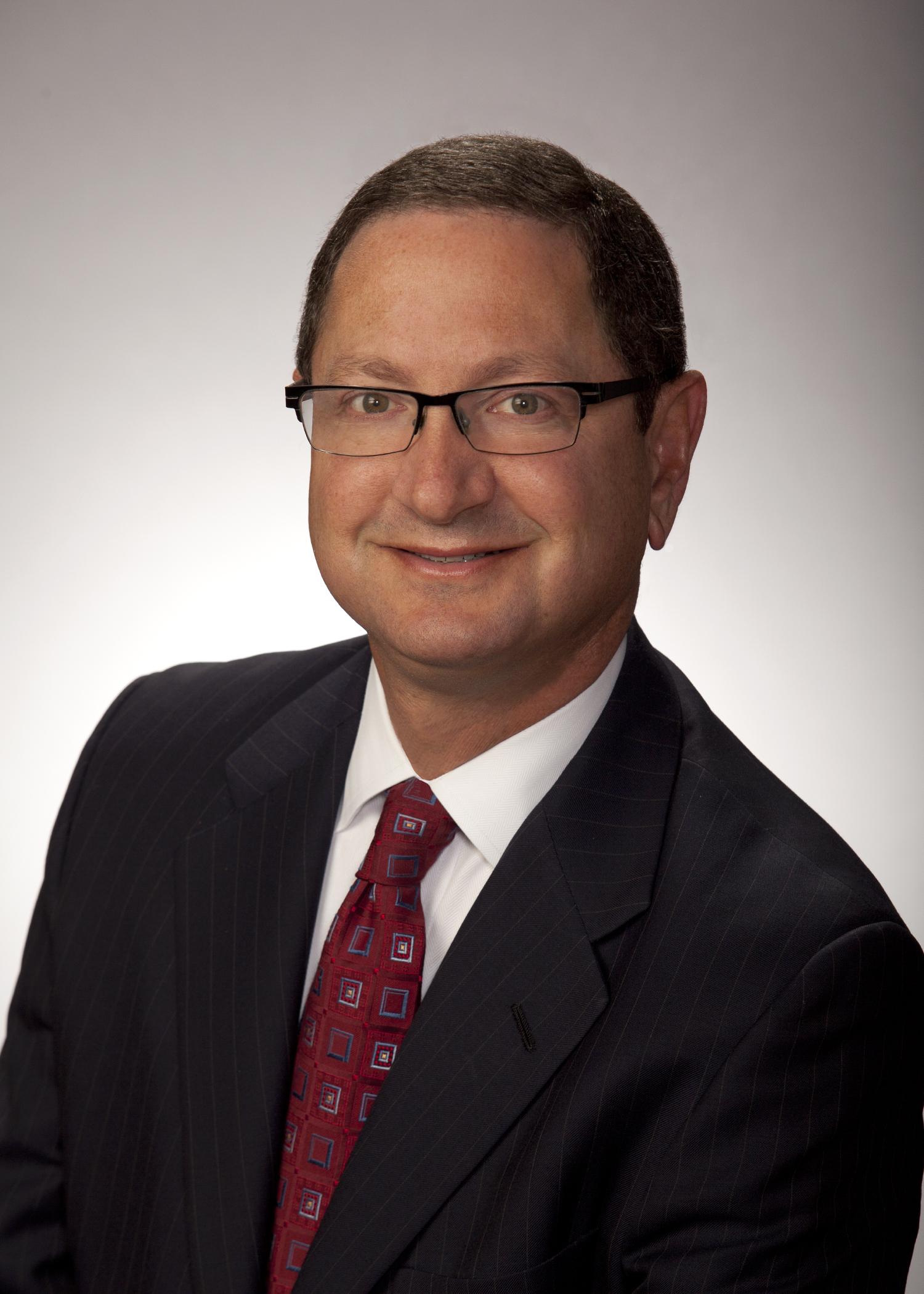
- Born: 1963 (age 62–63); Dallas, Texas, U.S.
- Education: Princeton University (BA); Stanford University (MBA)
- Occupations: Co-Founder and Chairman of NGP Energy Capital Management; President and CEO of the George W. Bush Presidential Center (2016–2025)

Kenneth A. Hersh (born 1963) is an American businessman and financier. He is the former chairman and CEO of NGP Energy Capital Management (NGP), a private equity firm based in Texas. From 2016 to 2025, he was the CEO of the George W. Bush Presidential Center in Dallas.

Energy Transfer Partners was one of Hersh's more notable investments with NGP, netting NGP a nearly 3,000% return on investment. The Carlyle Group acquired a $424 million stake in NGP Energy Capital and appointed Hersh as a senior advisor.

Hersh is currently a member of the Council on Foreign Relations and the World Economic Forum, and is also on the boards of the National Association for Urban Debate Leagues (NAUDL) and the George W. Bush Foundation. On May 31, 2016, he was appointed CEO and president of the George W. Bush Presidential Center. In 2017, Hersh made a $35 million investment in the esports company Envy Gaming and became chairman of the board at the company.

== Early life and education ==
Kenneth "Ken" Hersh was born in 1963 in Dallas, Texas, where he spent his childhood. In 1969, Hersh attended the St. Mark's School of Texas for both his primary and secondary education. He graduated from St. Mark's in 1981. Hersh subsequently attended Princeton University in New Jersey. He then attended Stanford University Graduate School of Business, where he graduated with an MBA in business administration in 1989, with designation as an Arjay Miller Scholar.

== Career ==
Hersh joined Morgan Stanley’s investment banking division in 1985, where he worked with an energy group. Richard Rainwater offered him a position as a manager for Natural Gas Partners, a newly formed private equity fund in 1988. Along with Rainwater and Gamble Baldwin, Hersh and David Albin co-founded the private equity fund Natural Gas Partners (NGP) in November 1988, as an energy fund focused on the oil and gas industries. By the early 1990s the firm had established a pattern of funding entrepreneurs and helping startup companies undergo mergers and acquisitions.

Hersh was appointed the chief investment officer at Rainwater Inc. in 1994. By March 2005, the NGP platform managed $1.6 billion in funds and had invested approximately $1.3 billion in around 70 private energy companies in North America. It had also structured and negotiated transactions totaling around $10 billion. Energy Transfer Partners proved to be one of Hersh's more notable investments, as the company netted NGP a nearly 3,000% return on investment over the course of five years.

Barclays Capital, an arm of Barclays Bank, purchased a 40% stake in NGP Energy Capital Management's stock in October 2006 in what the Financial Times reported was "believed to be among the largest ever [stake] taken in a private equity firm by an outside investor." At the time, NGP managed about $3.5 billion. By 2012, NGP had $12.1 billion under management, with around 75% of NGP's business involved in the acquisition and exploitation of gas and oil properties. In December 2012, through Barclays Natural Resource Investments, the Carlyle Group acquired a $424 million stake in NGP Energy Capital. In 2012, Hersh was appointed a senior advisor to The Carlyle Group, and was given the role of assisting in the "execution of the firm’s natural resources investment strategies."

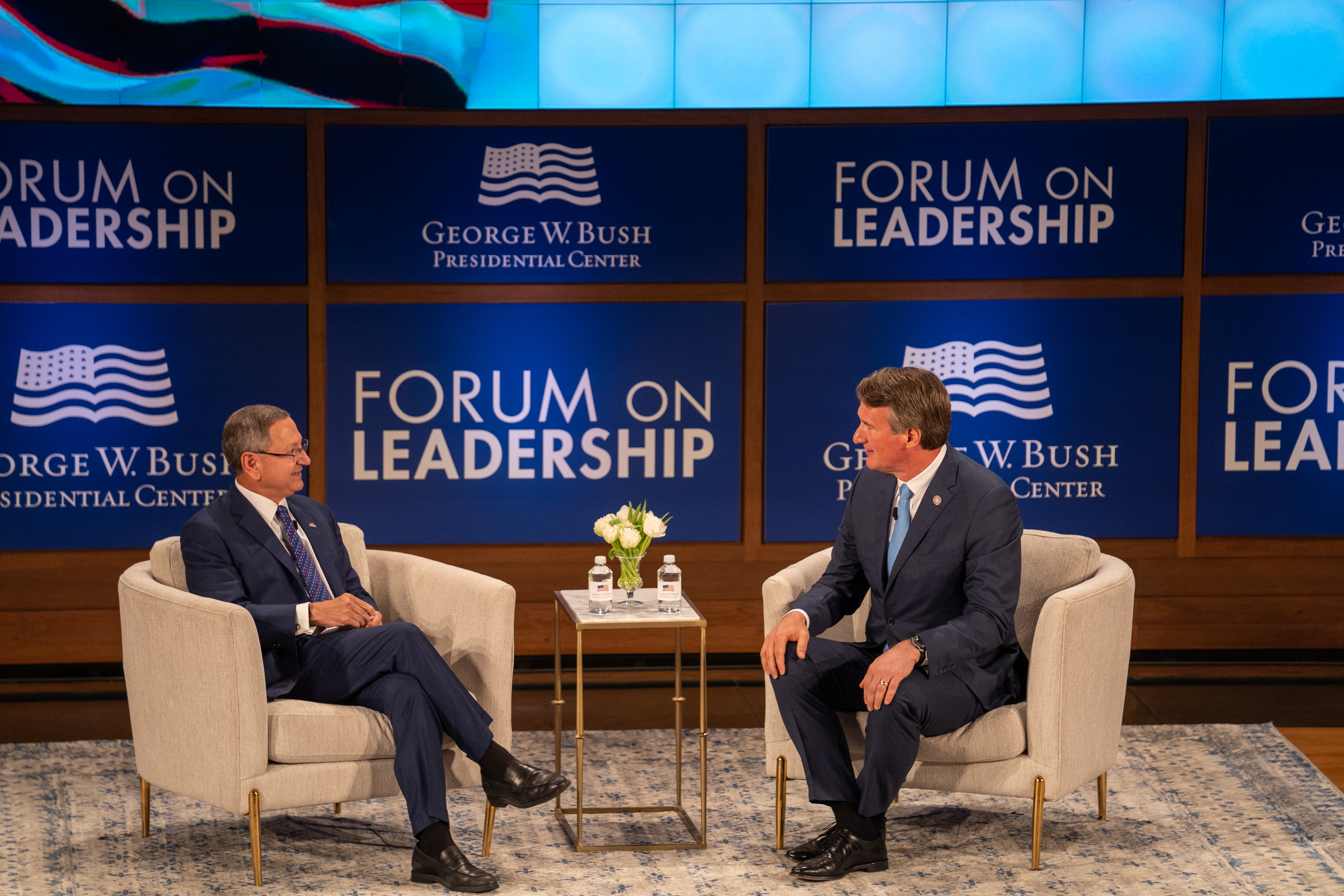
Hersh with Governor Glenn Youngkin in April 2023

Hersh served as NGP's CEO until 2015, at which point he took on the role of chairman instead. He also continued sitting on the NGP investment committees. NGP Energy Capital Management remains an energy affiliate of The Carlyle Group, and May 2016, Hersh was currently deputy chief investment officer for energy and natural resources and serves as senior advisor for its natural resources division. On May 31, 2016, the George W. Bush Foundation appointed Hersh as the new CEO and president of the George W. Bush Presidential Center. Among other responsibilities, the role made Hersh the manager of the Presidential Library and Museum on the Southern Methodist University campus in Dallas. Hersh was also appointed to the board of the George W. Bush Foundation.

In August 2017, Hersh made an investment of $35 million in the American esports company, Envy Gaming, through his firm Hersh Interactive Group. Following this significant investment from the Dallas-based investor, Envy Gaming moved its headquarters from Charlotte, North Carolina, to Dallas. Envy Gaming owns a number of esports teams, including Team Envy, Dallas Fuel, and Dallas Empire. Following the investment, Hersh became chairman of the board of Envy Gaming.

In late march 2023, Hersh published a memoir, The Fastest Tortoise: Winning in Industries I Knew Nothing About — A Life Spent Figuring It Out. The book, co-written with Steve Fiffer, was published by Greenleaf Book Group Press.

On November 1, 2023, Hersh was honored with the H. Neil Mallon Award by the World Affairs Council of Dallas–Fort Worth. Named in honor of the Council’s founder, the H. Neil Mallon Award is presented annually to individuals who have excelled at promoting the international aspects and strengths of North Texas.

In summer 2025, Hersh stepped down as president and CEO of the George W. Bush Presidential Center.

== Global Adaptation Institute ==
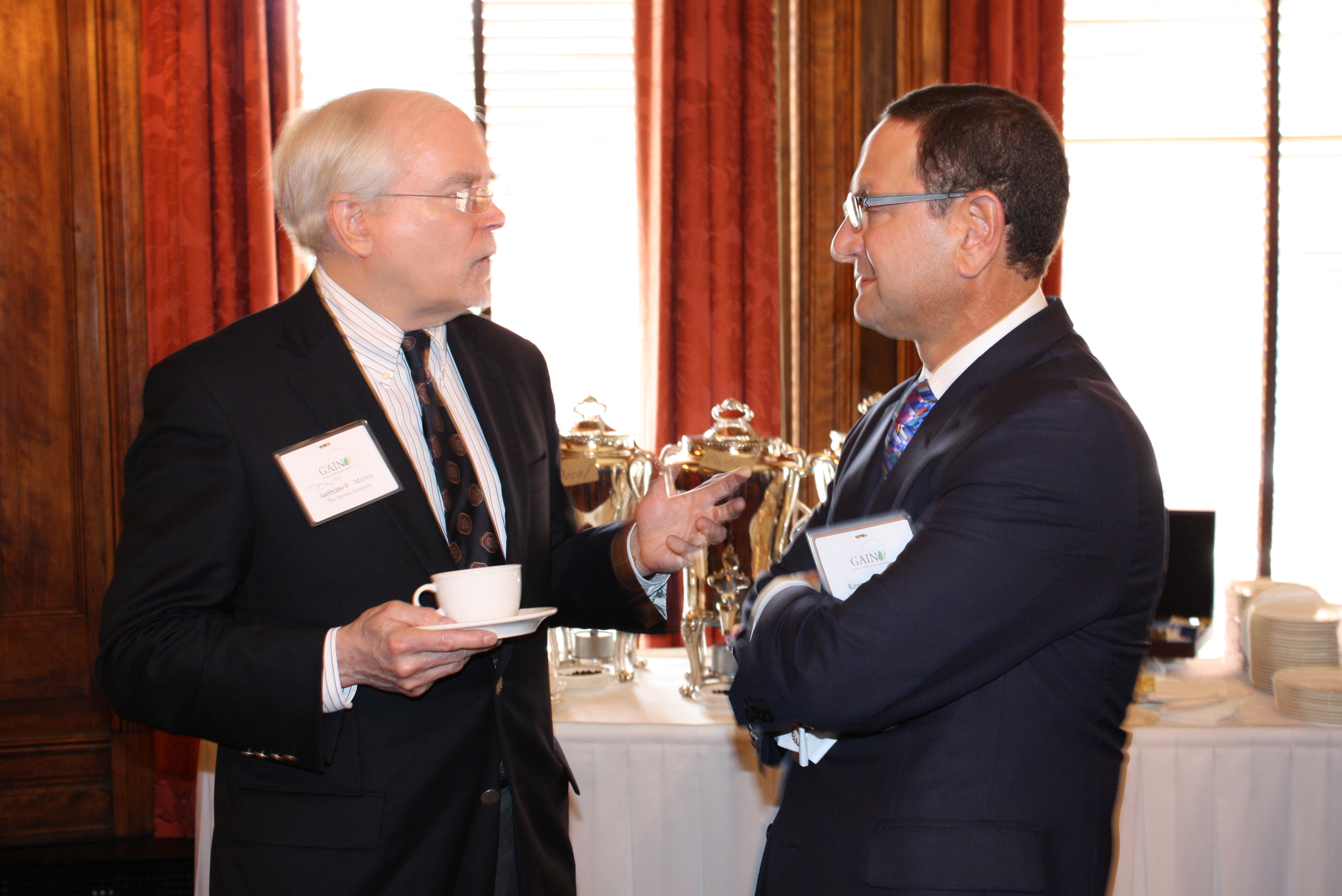
Hersh (right) at the Global Adaptation Summit in 2012.

In 2010, Hersh founded the Global Adaptation Institute, a non-profit based in Washington, D.C. He served as chairman until January 2013. Hersh serves on the advisory board of the Notre Dame Global Adaptation Index (ND-GAIN).

== See also ==
- List of entrepreneurs
- Notable alumni of St. Mark's School of Texas
