= Jim Adler =

American injury lawyer

- Born: May 23, 1943 (age 83); Dallas, Texas, U.S.
- Education: University of Texas, Austin (BA, JD)
- Political party: Democratic
- Spouse: Deborah Adler (m. 1982)
- Children: 4
- Website: Official website

James S. Adler (born May 23, 1943), also known by the nickname of The Texas Hammer, is an American trial attorney and businessman. He is the founder of Houston, Texas-based law firm Jim Adler & Associates. Adler has been practicing law in Texas in the area of personal injury for 54 years. Some of his TV advertisements have been a subject of controversy.

== Early life ==
Jim Adler was born May 23, 1943, to Alexander Adler and Ruth Adler (1919–2014). He was born and grew up in Dallas, Texas. Adler attended St. Mark's School of Texas and then entered the University of Texas at Austin, where he earned his undergraduate degree. Continuing his studies at the University of Texas School of Law, he received his Juris Doctor degree (J.D.) in 1967.

Due to his widely known trademark -The Texas Hammer and notorious TV ads, Adler attracted the attention of the national media. He was the subject of the Last Week Tonight with John Oliver season 8, episode 231, segment: Jim "The Texas Hammer" Adler vs. Mike "The Alabama Hammer" Slocumb, where John Oliver ironically detailed a copyright infringement lawsuit. Adler is also a character in the MTV cartoon series Beavis and Butt-Head. A similar attorney named Joe Adler appeared in Mike Judge's 2009 film, Extract, portrayed by Gene Simmons, who was also a personal injury lawyer.

== Career ==
At the beginning of his career, Adler served in the U.S. Army and U.S. Navy. During his military service, Adler was appointed judge for the Office of Civilian Health and Medical Programs United Services (OCHAMPUS) and got his first legal experience while adjudicating health and medical disputes for the military personnel. After being honorably discharged from the Army, Adler moved back to Dallas and did law enforcement work for the Texas State Securities Board. Adler was admitted to the bar in 1967.

Jim Adler is a member of the State Bar of Texas, American Bar Association (ABA) and American Trial Lawyers Association. He is licensed to practice in the United States Court of Appeals for the Fifth Circuit and U.S. District Courts of Texas.

=== Jim Adler & Associates ===
In 1973, Adler went into private practice and established Jim Adler & Associates, a law firm based in Houston. Initially, he tried a variety of legal areas including divorces and bankruptcies but later focused mainly on personal injury cases. By 2021, the company employed over 30 lawyers and a staff of over three hundred paralegals, case managers, receptionists and law clerks. The law firm is headquartered in Houston, Texas with satellite offices in Dallas, San Antonio and Channelview.

As a number of sources note, Adler's law firm was retained by dozens of victims to represent and manage their personal injury claims after the Astroworld Festival crowd crush, a tragic incident that happened on November 5, 2021 at the annual Astroworld Festival organized by American rapper Travis Scott.

=== Advertisements and copyright infringement lawsuits ===
Adler began investing in commercials on television in the early 1980s. He began using the "Texas Hammer" pseudonym in the early 2000s and registered it as a trademark with the USPTO in 2008. According to the Dallas Morning News and Dallas Business Journal, "Adler took acting lessons with a drama coach". The ads became popular in Texas but Jim Adler's ridiculous style of acting, where he often appeared holding a big hammer next to an 18 wheeler semi-trailer truck, attracted much criticism and attention for "pseudo-celebrity and turning lawsuits into an industry."

Adler has been involved in a series of lawsuits related to trademark and copyright infringement, where he has sued other lawyers for "copying his marketing strategy and using his trade name "The Texas Hammer" to obtain popularity among potential clients. One case in particular, Adler sued an Alabama attorney, Mike Slocumb, for airing commercials, "that were near duplicates of his own". The case became notable after the lawsuit became the subject of a segment on HBO's Last Week Tonight with John Oliver in August 2021.

According to the lawsuit, "Adler's company spent over $100 million on TV advertising in English and Spanish and the defendants have adopted Adler's famous persona and plaintiffs' intellectual property in a brazen bid to confuse and deceive consumers." Other lawsuits include Adler v. McNeil Consultants, Ramji Law Group of Houston, and more.

== Civic and charitable involvement ==
Jim Adler has worked with or board-chaired several US-based nonprofits and civic organizations, including Joint City/County Commission on Children, the Multiple Sclerosis Society, The Guild for the Blind, Habitat for Humanity, The American Cancer Society, Alzheimer’s Disease & Related Disorders, Arthritis Foundation and American Heart Association, among others.

In honor of Jim Adler, for his contributions to Kids Meals, Camp for All and other nonprofits, the mayor of Houston Sylvester Turner proclaimed July 30, 2021 as "Jim Adler Day". He is also a supporter and fundraiser for the Democratic Party.

== Personal life ==
Jim Adler is married to Deborah Adler. They currently reside in Houston, Texas and have four children, including the eldest son Bill Adler, also a lawyer at Jim Adler & Associates.
