= C.F. "Shorty" Key =

American football player

Clois Francis Key (1909–1970) was a college and professional football player in the 1930s. Known as "Shorty", Key was probably most widely known at the time for his violation of college eligibility rules while starring for UCLA in 1935.

== Early life ==
Key was born June 29, 1909, and attended high school in Vernon, Texas. He was then recruited to play football at a boarding high school in Dallas, the Terrill School, the forerunner to St. Mark's School of Texas. He graduated from Terrill in 1927.

== College football ==
Key played two years of college football for Weatherford Junior College and then started at fullback in 1930 and 1931 for the Texas College of Mines (the forerunner to the University of Texas, El Paso).

== Controversy ==
While Key's college eligibility had expired, he decided to continue his amateur football career a year later by moving to California and playing the 1932 season for the Urban Military Academy under the pseudonym of Rodney Vernon "Tex" Maness. Using the name Joe Gelhousen, he contemporaneously was recruited to start at fullback for the semi-pro San Pedro Longshoremen in a hastily organized September 1932 game against the military's All Fleet team. Key admits to getting paid for that game, but "it didn't amount to much." "Gelhousen" disappeared after that game.

Key enrolled at UCLA in 1934 and played for the Bruins for parts of the next two seasons. To make this work, Key enlisted the assistance of two relatives, who stood by him in the deception. He used the identity and high school transcript of a Texas cousin, Robert F. "Ted" Key, and lived with that cousin's father in Los Angeles. The 26-year-old Key immediately starred at fullback for UCLA. The highlight of his brief UCLA career was scoring the only touchdown and kicking the extra point in a 7–6 victory over undefeated Stanford University in 1935. That success was reported nationally. A day or two after the game, one of his former high school teachers recognized his photograph in the local Texas newspaper. She immediately called UCLA, and the ruse unraveled after a UCLA dean traveled by train to west Texas to investigate. Key was ultimately suspended from the UCLA team 5 minutes before a crucial game against University of California, Berkeley. Soon thereafter, Key confessed. He added, "sure, a lot of folks are going to laugh, but if they knew the hours I've spent worrying about the day when I would be exposed, they would understand the hell I've gone through."

== Professional football ==
Using the name that he had taken on at UCLA, Ted Key played fullback for the Fresno Wine Crushers in 1938 and the Des Moines Comets in 1940.

== Professional wrestling ==
Key was reportedly a professional wrestler for 15 years, though a wrestling database identifies him as having competed in 308 matches between 1936 and 1939 (114 wins and 102 losses are recorded).
