= Henry Martin (cartoonist) =

American cartoonist (1925–2020)

Henry Martin (July 15, 1925 – June 30, 2020) was an American cartoonist. He was born in Louisville, Kentucky to Lyman and Adele Martin, who were Christians. He had an older brother Lyman Jr. and a younger sister Adele. He went to high school at Texas Country Day (now St. Mark's School of Texas) in Dallas, then graduated from Princeton University in 1948 with a degree in Art History. He subsequently studied art at the American Academy of Art in Chicago. He was the father of popular children's author Ann M. Martin.

According to a press release from Princeton University:

Martin worked as a cartoonist and illustrator for more than 50 years, publishing in The New Yorker, Punch, Ladies' Home Journal, The Saturday Evening Post, the Princeton Alumni Weekly and many other magazines. His single-panel comic strip, "Good News/Bad News," was nationally syndicated, and he wrote and/or illustrated more than 35 books. He retired in 1995.

In the 1950s and 1960s Mr. Martin provided numerous comic illustrations for books published by the Peter Pauper Press in Mount Vernon. Martin received the National Cartoonists Society Gag Cartoon Award for 1978 for his work.

He died on 30 June 2020 at the age of 94.

== Works ==
- Martin, Henry (1977). Yak! Yak! Yak! Blah! Blah! Blah!. Scribner. ISBN 9780684151267.
- Martin, Henry (1977). Good News, Bad News. Scribner. ISBN 978-0684148441.

== See also ==
- Notable alumni of St. Mark's School of Texas
