= Lou Jennings =

American football player (1904–1957)

Profile
- Positions: End, center

Personal information
- Born: January 12, 1904; Muskogee, Oklahoma, U.S.
- Died: October 25, 1957 (aged 53); Travis County, Ohio, U.S.
- Listed height: 6 ft 3 in (1.91 m)
- Listed weight: 230 lb (104 kg)

Career information
- High school: Muskogee (OK), St. Mark's School of Texas (TX)
- College: Haskell, Centenary

Career history
- Providence Steam Roller (1929); Portsmouth Spartans (1930)
- Stats at Pro Football Reference

Louie Walter Jennings (January 12, 1904 – October 25, 1957) was an American football player.

Jennings was born and raised in Muskogee, Oklahoma. He was then recruited to play football for the Terrill School, a Dallas boarding high school that was the forerunner of St. Mark's School of Texas. He graduated from Terrill in 1923. He then attended Haskell Indian College (the forerunner to the Haskell Indian Nations University before transferring to Centenary College, where he played on the varsity football team for 4 years.

After college, Jennings was an offensive and defensive lineman in the National Football League (NFL) for 2 years. He played for the Providence Steam Roller in 1929 and the Portsmouth Spartans in 1930. He appeared in 11 NFL games, starting all of them.

Using his Native American name, Blue Sun, Jennings competed as a professional wrestler between 1931 and 1939, participating in 571 bouts. He is credited with 159 wins and 315 losses.
