= Stuart P. Wright =

Stuart Phillips Wright (1903–1982) was a multi-sport college athlete who went on to serve in World War II and the Korean Conflict, rising to the rank of major general.

== Early life and education ==
Stuart Wright was born in Dallas, Texas. In 1921, he graduated from the Terrill School for Boys, the forerunner of the St. Mark's School of Texas. His coaches at Terrill included Eugene Neely and Pete Cawthon. After two years at Dartmouth College, Wright transferred to the University of Texas at Austin, where he received his bachelor's degree.

== Athletics ==
At the University of Texas, Wright lettered in three varsity sports: track, football, and basketball.

In 1925, Wright won the Southwest Conference 220-yard hurdles and was the overall high point winner at the conference championships. In 1926, Wright was elected co-captain of the UT track team and won the 120-yard high hurdles at the conference championships. UT won the overall conference championship both years.

In football, Wright reportedly complained about having to play quarterback as well as his favored position of halfback. His coach responded, “it’s not up to you; it’s up to you to do what you’re supposed to do.” Wright apparently played quarterback when called upon.

== Military ==
Wright was appointed a flying cadet in 1927. After completing primary and advanced flying schools, he was commissioned a second lieutenant in the Air Reserve. He received his regular commission 1930. After multiple assignments in the ensuing years, Wright assumed command of the First Bomb Squadron, Ninth Bomb Group in July 1940. His squad was assigned to Panama and Trinidad as the United States entered World War II. In August 1942, Wright moved to Army Air Force headquarters, Washington, D.C., to lead projects in the Directorate of Communications.

In April 1944, Wright assumed command of the 497th Bomb Group. After training at Clovis Field, New Mexico, for three months, Wright took the Group to Saipan in the Marianas Islands. In February 1945 he joined the 73rd Bomb Wing, also in the Marianas. In April 1945, he became communications officer of the 20th Air Force in the South Pacific.

After the war ended, Wright worked in communications, primarily at the Strategic Air Command (SAC) headquarters within Andrews Air Force Base. He became chief of the Electronics Section, SAC, in August 1948. In September 1950, he was appointed deputy commanding general of the Air Proving Ground Command at Eglin Air Force Base, Florida. Transferred to the Far East Air Forces in March 1953, he was designated deputy commander of the Fifth Air Force (Rear) in Korea.

In May 1954, Wright assumed command of the Rome Air Development Center, Air Research and development command, at Griffiss Air Force Base, in New York.

Wright retired at the rank of major general.

== Awards ==
Wright was elected to the Hall of Honor, University of Texas Athletics, in 1984.

Wright's military decorations include the Legion of Merit, Distinguished Flying Cross, Bronze Star Medal and Air Medal.
