= John Steakley =

American novelist (1951–2010)

- Born: July 26, 1951; Cleburne, Texas
- Died: November 27, 2010 (aged 59); McKinney, Texas
- Occupation: Writer
- Writing career
- Genres: Science fiction, Horror

John William Steakley Jr. (July 26, 1951 – November 27, 2010) was an American science fiction author. He published two major novels, Armor (1984) and Vampire$ (1990); the latter was the basis for John Carpenter's Vampires movie. He published four short science fiction and fantasy stories.

== Personal life ==
Steakley was born in Cleburne, Texas. Aside from brief spells in South America and Hollywood, Steakley lived most of his life in Texas. Steakley's father owned a Chevrolet dealership in Dallas from 1962 until he sold it in 1999. Steakley attended St. Mark's School and graduated from Colorado Academy, a boarding school in Denver. He then went on to study at Westminster College in Missouri, and at Southern Methodist University, where he received his BA in English.

In 1988, Steakley married photographer Lori Jones; they held their wedding reception in the showroom of a local Subaru dealership. He was an avid golfer and in the mid-1990s carried a single-digit handicap. He died after a five-year battle with liver disease.

== Career ==
Steakley's sister told the press that he went to Hollywood at the invitation of screenwriter L.M. "Kit" Carson. He sold a film treatment, and played a bit part ("Local 1") in at least one film, Don't Open the Door!, but "he stayed out there a few years and just hated it." Following through on his childhood fantasy of becoming a science fiction writer, Steakley returned to Texas, and wrote. He published his first professional short story, "The Bluenose Limit", in the March 1981 issue of Amazing Stories; and another, "Flyer", in the September 1982 issue. He published two major novels, Armor (1984) and Vampire$ (1990). According to his website, he worked on the incomplete Armor II for years.

Steakley wrote the screenplay for the 1997 film, Scary Texas Movie; he also played a nameless bit part in that film. Steakley also played a nameless bit part in the 2000 film Playing Dead.

In 1998, John Carpenter directed a screen adaptation of Vampire$ (retitled Vampires), which starred James Woods as the leader of a Catholic Church-sanctioned team of vampire hunters. That year Steakley was the Toastmaster for the World Horror Convention.

== Selected works ==
- Armor (December 1984, DAW Books, ISBN 978-0-88677-368-7)
- Vampire$ (November 1990, Roc Books, ISBN 978-0-451-45033-3)

== See also ==
- Notable alumni of St. Mark's School of Texas
