= Louisville Tanks =

General information
- Founded: 1935
- Folded: 1940
- Stadium: Parkway Field
- Headquartered: Louisville, Kentucky, United States
- Colors: Green, Gold

Personnel
- Owner: American Standard, Inc.
- General manager: William H. Goepper
- Head coach: H.M. "Harry" Reid

Team history
- Louisville Tanks (1935–1940)

League / conference affiliations
- Midwest Football League (1935–1937); American Football League (1938); APFA (1939)

Championships
- Other League Championships: 2 MFL 1935–1937, AFL 1938

The Louisville Tanks were a minor league professional American football team that existed from 1935 to 1940. The team formed in the wake of the dissolution of the Louisville Bourbons of the short-lived American Football League of 1934. Organized and owned by American Standard, Inc., the team was coached by AS plant manager H.M. "Harry" Reed; its name and colors (green and gold) come from one of the products sold by American Standard. The Tanks played their home games at Parkway Field in Louisville, Kentucky, USA.

A charter member of the Midwest Football League (which evolved into the American Football League of 1938), the Tanks' first four seasons ended with league championships. In 1939, after the AFL added the Cincinnati Bengals, Los Angeles Bulldogs (both formerly of the second major American Football League), and the Columbus Bullies (an independent team), the Tanks had the only losing season in their existence (1939), finishing in last place in the newly renamed American Professional Football Association.

The APFA announced its intention to become a major league in early 1940 and added a team from Milwaukee, but its ambitious plans crumbled in July, when Cincinnati, Columbus, and the new Milwaukee team defected to a new major American Football League. The APFA was mortally wounded as Louisville and the Dayton Bombers announced that they would not field teams for the 1940 season. The Tanks, the Bombers, and the APFA did not return to the field.

== Origin, the Midwest Football League, and the American Football League ==
Formed to fill the vacuum formed by the departure of the Louisville Bourbons, the Tanks wasted no time in becoming a charter member of the Midwest Football League in 1935. The Tanks shared the 1935 championship with the Cincinnati Models and the Indianapolis Indians, two teams that disappeared within the next couple of years. Louisville then dominated the league in 1936 and 1937, winning the championship title outright in both seasons. In the 1937 contest, which was played on Sunday, December 12, the Tanks hosted the Cincinnati Models in the championship game, with the Tanks prevailing 13–0 behind touchdowns from Edward Crum and "Ripper" Roberts.

The time between the end of the 1937 and beginning of the 1938 campaign saw much change involving the Tanks. The second major league AFL disbanded, and the freshly expanded Midwest League quickly adopted the name of the recently deceased league. While the new AFL was still asserting that it was strictly a midwestern league with no major league ambition, its footprint expanded to include Chicago and Nashville. While the Tanks finished the regular season in third place with a four-win, three-loss record (behind the Chicago Indians and the newly reformed St. Louis Gunners (four years after the latter playing in the National Football League), the Tanks won the championship in the first system of playoffs in a minor professional football league. In a Shaughnessy playoff, the Tanks beat Chicago 13–0 and St. Louis 3–0 to claim the team's fourth title in its fourth year of existence.

== American Professional Football Association and demise ==
The year 1939 was the fifth year of the Tanks' existence, still with their original owners and their original (head) coach, and still in the league which they helped form in their first days of their existence. The former Midwest Football League, on the other hand, changed its name for the second consecutive year (to the American Professional Football Association) as it hinted at being more than a midwestern minor league as it added the Cincinnati Bengals and Los Angeles Bulldogs of the second major AFL and a powerful independent team that would later dominate another pro football league: the Columbus Bullies. The Tanks' string of winning seasons – and league championships – ended at four as they finished in last place with a 2–9 record. The three newcomers finished in the top three positions.

The following year started with both optimism and surprise for the APFA membership. The Columbus Bullies were declared the champions with a 9–4 record despite the Los Angeles Bulldogs' losing only a single game (7 wins, 1 loss) and the Cincinnati Bengals' having a 6–2 record. Milwaukee was admitted as the replacement for the Bulldogs, who left to form the Pacific Coast Professional Football League... and the league admitted to its having major league aspirations as the Green Bay Packers protested the APFA's intrusion into its territory.

By July, it was all over as Cincinnati, Columbus, and Milwaukee left the loop to become the charter members of a new American Football League. Louisville and the Dayton Bombers announced that they were not fielding teams for 1940... and the APFA folded. The Tanks and the Bombers never returned to the gridiron.

== See also ==
- Sports in Louisville, Kentucky
