= Vampires (novel) =

1990 novel by John Steakley

Vampire$
- Roc Books 1992 edition
- Author: John Steakley
- Language: English
- Genre: Fantasy
- Published: 1990 (Roc Books)
- Publication place: United States
- Media type: Print (Paperback)
- Pages: 357 pp (first edition)
- ISBN: 978-0-451-45033-3 (first edition)
- OCLC: 25775691

Vampires (sometimes stylized as Vampire$) is a 1990 horror novel by John Steakley. A dark fantasy with a contemporary setting, the novel concerns a company called Vampire$, Inc. which treats vampire-hunting as a commercial enterprise, funded by large payments from the vampires' potential victims and secretly supported from the highest levels of the Roman Catholic Church.

== Plot summary ==
Vampire$, Inc. cleans out a nest of vampires, but has some difficulty collecting their payment and ultimately hosts a wild party at a local motel with all of the team and some townsfolk. The party is interrupted by a "master vampire" who slaughters everyone at the party with the exception of Jack Crow and his second-in-command "Cherry Cat" Catlin.

The shaken Jack begins to plan the formation of a new team, aided by Father Adam, a knowledgeable young priest sent to him by the Vatican. Events at the motel slaughter lead Jack to realize that silver, particularly blessed silver from a cross, can be used as a weapon against vampires. He has his weaponsmith Carl begin creating silver bullets and he recruits a skilled gunman named Felix, that Jack met while working as a government agent in Mexico. Felix proves to be as deadly with a pistol as Jack hoped and they seem to have a new and powerful resource to use against the vampires. In addition to the silver bullets, Carl also develops a "vampire detector" for use by the team, which proves to be a useful tool against the vampires (which are portrayed as fantastically fast and powerful compared to humans, particularly the 'master vampires').

A series of battles ensues, using these silver bullets against the vampires, but key members of Jack's team are killed by the vampires, including Annabelle, the office manager of the team's residence, and the aging Carl. Jack, depressed and beaten, suicidally returns to a known favorite hotel where the vampires are sure to find him. Felix, Cat and Father Adam stage a rescue attempt but it ends with Father Adam dead and Jack spirited away by the vampire.

The novel closes with Felix taking a leadership role within Vampire$ Inc., after thwarting an attempt by the now-vampirized Jack Crow to attack the Pope.

== Relation to Armor ==
Part of the novel is about the relationship between the lead vampire hunter, ex-DEA agent Jack Crow, and the gunman he hires, an ex-drugrunner named Felix. A note on the copyright page states, "This Felix is no other Felix. This Jack Crow is no other Jack Crow." In this novel, Felix is the owner of a bar called the Antwar Saloon; the main characters of Steakley's military SF novel Armor are named Jack Crow and Felix and they fight in "the Ant War". Despite the disclaimer, the Jack Crow and Felix characters in both novels have many parallels; Jack Crow is the wisecracking almost-anti-hero in both works, and Felix is the gifted-but-reluctant warrior.

== Film adaptation ==
The novel served as the basis for the 1998 film John Carpenter's Vampires.
