= Armor (novel) =

1984 novel by John Steakley

- First edition cover art by James Gurney
- Author: John Steakley
- Cover artist: James Gurney
- Language: English
- Genre: Military science fiction
- Publisher: DAW Books
- Publication date: December 4, 1984
- Publication place: United States
- Media type: Print (paperback)
- Pages: 432 pp
- ISBN: 0-88677-368-7
- OCLC: 51644674

Armor is a military science fiction novel by John Steakley. It features the military use of exoskeletons and insect-like alien enemies but concentrates on the psychological effects of violence on human beings.

It was first published in December 1984.

== Plot summary ==
Armor is the story of humanity's war against an alien race whose foot soldiers are three-meter-tall insects, referred to in the book as "ants". It is also the story of a research colony on the fringes of human territory which is threatened by pirates. The two sub-plots intersect at the end, with each providing answers and insight into events of the other.

The title refers to the nuclear-powered exoskeletons worn by the soldiers, but also references the emotional armor the protagonists maintain to survive.

=== The plot on Banshee ===
The protagonist is Felix, an enlistee who's been given "scout" duty on an alien planet in the seemingly endless Antwar. Little is known of him initially but that he suffers from burnout and refuses to die, even when it seems inevitable. When entering into combat, a persona he calls the "Engine" takes over. The Engine makes him into a ruthless killing machine dedicated to keeping him alive at all costs.

It will work when I cannot. It will examine and determine and choose and, at last, act. It will do all this while I cower inside.

— John Steakley, Armor, pg. 18 (1st paperback ed.)

The novel starts with Felix and his company assaulting an inhospitable planet aptly named "Banshee". Using armored infantry suits, soldiers drop onto the planet from starships via a teleportation device called "Transit". The attack goes horribly wrong, as Felix's company is completely wiped out, and the mountain fort they were originally supposed to capture is revealed to be a giant hive. In the aftermath of his first encounter, Felix regroups with the surviving humans. There, he meets another highly skilled scout named Forest, who participated in the fleet-wide Armored Olympics against decorated soldier Nathan Kent. It is also revealed that the Ants can lock onto the fleet's Transit beacons and barrage them with missiles fired from the Hive, making retreat impossible.

During a fallback to an elevated bluff, a dying soldier keys all functions on the suit and blows up the nuclear powered armor. Several warriors are killed in the disaster, including Forest. Before dying she confesses to Felix that she always loved Kent. With no options left the warriors resort to attacking the Hive to secure transport back to the ship. Exploiting the Hive's tunnel system, they plan to use a wounded soldier as a bomb to destroy it. Before the attack, Felix meets a soldier named Bolov who tells him that as a scout on his first drop, Felix has a 10% chance of survival.

Felix and his fellow soldiers are ambushed by ants on their way up the hive. During the attack, the soldier they planned on using as a bomb is killed, rendering him useless. In a stroke of bad luck, Bolov is also mortally wounded, grudgingly accepts the task of sacrificing himself and is thrown in the Hive by Felix. The Hive is then destroyed and the survivors are able to retreat back to the ship.

After 19 drops on Banshee, Felix has learned that he is an almost unstoppable warrior. His 20th drop is revealed to be a fleet mission to create humanity's first forward operating base on Banshee. He also learns that Nathan Kent will be dropping with him.

The soldiers successfully create an impregnable fort on Banshee. Felix learns from his inexperienced Commanding Officer, Canada Shoen, that one of the purposes of the fort is to show non-combat officers and journalists what the war is like. Felix is disgusted by this revelation. After spending time with Nathan Kent, he tells him about Forest's death and her true feelings for him. Kent is devastated and attacks Felix in a drunken rage. The fort withstands several assaults from the ants and wears them down almost to complete exhaustion. During a celebration for their victory, ants attack from underground and kill dozens of people, before ultimately being crushed again.

Felix discovers that his 21st drop will be with the Masao, the hereditary ruler of an extremely wealthy extra-solar planet of the same name founded and inhabited by Japanese. They drop into an area not infested with ants so that he can see Banshee for himself. The Masao goads Felix until he admits his past as the Guardian Archon, the elected leader of Golden, a similarly affluent planet. Felix's wife Angel was killed in a tragic freighter accident when she fled Golden, whose people would not accept her because she was from Earth. Felix had blamed Golden, shirked his responsibilities and joined the fleet in hopes of dying in battle. The Masao, who is his lifelong best friend, Allie, begs for Felix to return to Golden. He agrees to leave the military as Allie has brought a small courier ship and funds for him and his desire to die had subsided, but still refuses to return to Golden. Only moments before being teleported onto the ship, Felix notices a Hive in the distance that barrages them with missiles, killing Allie.

In the ensuing chaotic moments after being beamed back to the ship, Kent grabs Felix, who is being blamed for Allie's death. He pops Felix's armor and pushes him onto the ship that Allie had brought before being killed by troops as he blocked their path to Felix.

=== The plot on Sanction ===
A secondary plot takes place on Sanction, a planet far removed from the fighting, at a Fleet research facility. The two plots are intertwined, with events Felix experienced on Banshee recalled as flashbacks.

Jack Crow is a notorious celebrity and one-time pirate. A morally questionable character with views and opinions that are just as questionable, he is a tough man who does not hesitate to kill. He is constantly at odds with his own morality but he knows the difference between his celebrity reputation and his real personality. At times, his reputation is more of a burden than a blessing.

Jack, having been imprisoned, escapes and reaches the ship of a mutineer and deserter from the Antwar named Borglyn. Jack strikes a deal where, in exchange for Borglyn saving his life, he will infiltrate and sabotage the Fleet research project on Sanction so Borglyn can access its limitless Fleet power source to refuel his ship, a pretense as Borglyn actually wants to take over the planet. Borglyn will also pay Jack and give him a VIP courier ship to go his own way.

On Sanction, Jack takes an old suit of battle armor from the courier ship to project Director Hollis "Holly" Ware, to ingratiate himself and get the necessary access to fulfill his bargain with Borglyn. But Jack is then asked by Holly to participate in an experiment to retrieve the data from the suit's battle recorder, which is the "memory" of the wearer while the suit was active.

Out of curiosity and a bit of false bonhomie, Jack agrees; he, Holly and Lya (a Fleet psychologist and Holly's girlfriend) spend several sessions "immersed" firsthand in the life of Felix on Banshee and on board ship. During these sessions, more of events on Banshee are described, and the reader is introduced for the first time to Felix as he sees himself and experiences battle.

Through either the complacency or gross incompetence of his superiors, Felix has suffered unbelievably, yet continues to soldier on. This also challenges the trio to deal with the knowledge that the public story of the Antwar is far different from the true horror. These immersions change Jack - as it does the others - so that he chooses to make an almost certain suicidal stand with Holly against Borglyn's attack on the facility.

Throughout the novel, Jack comes into contact with the alcoholic owner of Sanction, a wealthy rancher named Lewis. Lewis is profoundly anti-war and doesn't allow his citizens to carry energy weapons. Jack comes to despise Lewis for his irresponsible drunken nature. During Borglyn's attack, Jack and Holly are on the verge of defeat when Lewis mounts a last minute rescue. Sensing the hopelessness of the situation, he reactivates the armor, revealing himself to be Felix. The ship Borglyn gave Jack was Felix's. He dons the fully charged scout armor and uses it to destroy Borglyn's forces and attack the ship. At the last second, Borglyn fires all of the ships weapon's, seemingly destroying everything around it. He orders the crew to lift off to escape Felix.

Jack and Holly watch in awe as this happens, and catch a final glimpse of Felix on the back of the starship through a security camera just before the ship moves out of range. The government of Golden sends emissaries to Sanction to learn the story. They refuse to end their search for their leader as no wreckage or bodies were found. Jack, Holly, and Lya start new lives on Sanction outside of fleet influence.

== Relation to Vampire$ ==
Characters named "Felix" and "Jack Crow" appear in the 1990 John Steakley novel Vampire$, along with an easter egg about the Antwar. Vampire$ is set in a contemporary modern age fantasy world, unlike the science fiction future world of Armor.

== Developments ==
A sequel was in the works at the time of Steakley's death. In 2022, an early manuscript of the original book was donated to Charleston College library. It is held as part of the James Oliver Rigney Jr. papers special collection- containing the works and documents of the late author better known as Robert Jordan. The manuscript is dated 1981.

== See also ==
- Starship Troopers by Robert A. Heinlein
- The Forever War by Joe Haldeman
- All You Need Is Kill by Hiroshi Sakurazaka
- Old Man's War by John Scalzi
