= Los Angeles Rams =

NFL team in Los Angeles, California

- Current season
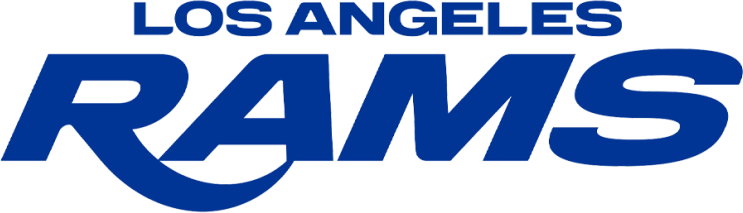
Logo	Wordmark
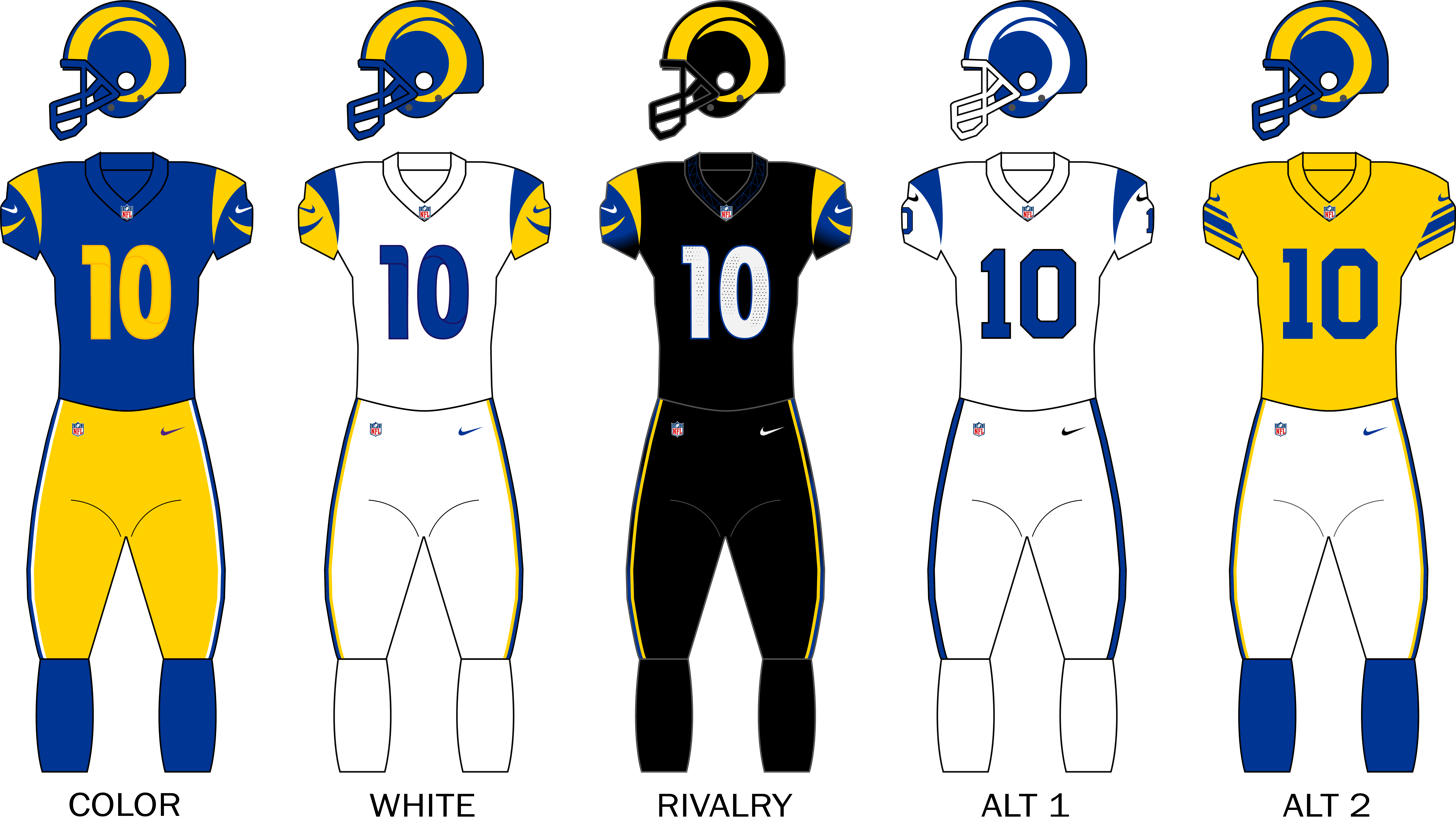
- Uniforms

General information
- Founded: April 11, 1936; 90 years ago
- Stadium: SoFi Stadium; Inglewood, California
- Headquartered: Rams Village at Warner Center; Los Angeles, California
- Colors: Rams royal, sol, white, midnight
- Mascot: Rampage
- Website: therams.com

Personnel
- Owner: Stan Kroenke
- General manager: Les Snead
- Head coach: Sean McVay
- President: Kevin Demoff

Nicknames
- The Greatest Show on Turf (offensive skill players, 1999–2001); Mob Squad (2015–2019) (current fans); Fearsome Foursome (defensive line, 1963–1971)

Team history
- Cleveland Rams (1936–1942, 1944–1945); Suspended operations (1943); Los Angeles Rams (1946–1994, 2016–present); St. Louis Rams (1995–2015)

Home fields
- Cleveland Stadium (1936–1937, 1939–1941); League Park (1937, 1942, 1944–1945); Shaw Stadium (1938); Los Angeles Memorial Coliseum (1946–1979, 2016–2019); Anaheim Stadium (1980–1994); Busch Memorial Stadium (1995); Edward Jones Dome (1995–2015); SoFi Stadium (2020–present)

League / conference affiliations
- American Football League (1936) National Football League (1937–present): Western Division (1937–1949); National Conference (1950–1952); Western Conference (1953–1969); NFL Coastal Division (1967–1969); National Football Conference (1970–present); NFC West (1970–present)

Championships
- League championships: 4: NFL championships (pre-1970 AFL–NFL merger) (2) 1945, 1951; Super Bowl championships: 2 1999 (XXXIV), 2021 (LVI)
- Conference championships: 8: NFL National: 1950, 1951; NFL Western: 1955; NFC: 1979, 1999, 2001, 2018, 2021
- Division championships: 19: NFL Western: 1945, 1949; NFL Coastal: 1967, 1969; NFC West: 1973, 1974, 1975, 1976, 1977, 1978, 1979, 1985, 1999, 2001, 2003, 2017, 2018, 2021, 2024

Playoff appearances (34)
- NFL: 1945, 1949, 1950, 1951, 1952, 1955, 1967, 1969, 1973, 1974, 1975, 1976, 1977, 1978, 1979, 1980, 1983, 1984, 1985, 1986, 1988, 1989, 1999, 2000, 2001, 2003, 2004, 2017, 2018, 2020, 2021, 2023, 2024, 2025

Owners
- Homer Marshman (1937–1941); Dan Reeves (1941–1972); Robert Irsay (1972); Carroll Rosenbloom (1972–1979); Georgia Frontiere (1979–2008); Chip Rosenbloom (2008–2010); Stan Kroenke (2010–present)

The Los Angeles Rams are a professional American football team based in the Greater Los Angeles area. The Rams compete in the National Football League (NFL) as a member of the National Football Conference (NFC) West division. The team plays its home games at SoFi Stadium in Inglewood, California, which it shares with the Los Angeles Chargers. They are headquartered at the Rams Village at Warner Center in Los Angeles.

The franchise was founded in 1936 as the Cleveland Rams in Cleveland, Ohio. The franchise won the 1945 NFL Championship Game, then moved to Los Angeles in 1946, making way for Paul Brown's Cleveland Browns of the All-America Football Conference and becoming the only NFL championship team to play the following season in another city. The club played its home games at the Los Angeles Memorial Coliseum until 1980, when it moved into a reconstructed Anaheim Stadium in Orange County, California. The Rams made their first Super Bowl appearance at the end of the 1979 NFL season, losing Super Bowl XIV to the Pittsburgh Steelers, 31–19.

After the 1994 NFL season, the Rams left Southern California and moved to St. Louis, Missouri, becoming the St. Louis Rams. Five seasons later, the team defeated the Tennessee Titans to win Super Bowl XXXIV, 23–16 in the first season of the "Greatest Show on Turf" era, in which they also made Super Bowl XXXVI but lost 20–17 to the New England Patriots. After the 2015 NFL season, the team sought and received approval from the other owners to move back to Los Angeles in time for the 2016 NFL season. The Rams appeared in Super Bowl LIII but lost to the Patriots, 13–3. Three years later, the Rams defeated the Cincinnati Bengals 23–20 to win Super Bowl LVI, becoming the second NFL team to win the Super Bowl in its home stadium.

The club is the only NFL franchise to win championships representing three different cities: Cleveland in 1945, St. Louis in 1999, and Los Angeles in 1951 and 2021.

== History ==
=== Cleveland Rams (1936–1945) ===
The Cleveland Rams were founded on April 11, 1936, by Ohio attorney Homer Marshman and player-coach Damon Wetzel, a former Ohio State star who played briefly for the Chicago Bears and Pittsburgh Pirates. Wetzel, who served as general manager, selected the "Rams", because his favorite college football team was the Fordham Rams from Fordham University; Marshman, the principal owner, also liked the name choice. The team was part of the newly formed American Football League and finished the 1936 regular season in second place with a 5–2–2 record, trailing only the 8–3 record of league champion Boston Shamrocks. The team featured players such as William "Bud" Cooper, Harry "The Horse" Mattos, Stan Pincura, and Mike Sebastian.

The Rams joined the National Football League on February 12, 1937, and were assigned to the Western Division. The Rams would be the fourth in a string of short-lived teams based in Cleveland, following the Cleveland Tigers, Cleveland Bulldogs, and Cleveland Indians. From the beginning, they were a team marked by frequent moves, playing in three stadiums over several losing seasons. However, the team featured the Most Valuable Player of the 1939 season, rookie halfback Parker Hall.

In June 1941, the Rams were bought by Dan Reeves and Fred Levy Jr who was an owner of a department chain. Reeves, an heir to his family's grocery-chain business that had been purchased by Safeway, used some of his inheritance to buy his share of the team. Levy's family owned the Levy Brothers department store chain in Kentucky and he came to own the Riverside International Raceway. Levy owned part of the Rams with Bob Hope, another of the owners, until Reeves bought out his partners in 1962.

The franchise suspended operations and sat out the 1943 season because of a shortage of players during World War II and resumed playing in 1944.

==== NFL champions (1945) ====
The team finally achieved success in 1945, which was their last season in Ohio. Adam Walsh took over as head coach that season. Quarterback Bob Waterfield, a rookie from UCLA, passed, ran, and place-kicked his way to the league's Most Valuable Player award, which was known as the Joe F. Carr Trophy back then, and helped the Rams achieve a 9–1 record and win their first NFL Championship, a 15–14 home field victory over the Washington Redskins on December 16. The margin of victory was provided by a safety: Redskins great Sammy Baugh's pass bounced off the goal post, then backward, through his team's own end zone. The next season, NFL rules were changed to prevent this from ever again resulting in a score; instead, it would merely result in an incomplete pass.

=== Original tenure in Los Angeles (1946–1994) ===
On January 12, 1946, Reeves was denied a request by the other NFL owners to move the Cleveland Rams to Los Angeles and the then-103,000-seat Los Angeles Memorial Coliseum. He threatened to end his relationship with the NFL and get out of the professional football business altogether unless the transfer to Los Angeles was permitted. A settlement was reached and, as a result, Reeves was allowed to move his team to Los Angeles. Consequently, the NFL became the first professional coast-to-coast sports entertainment industry.

From 1933, when Joe Lillard left the Chicago Cardinals, through 1946, there were no black players in professional American football. After the Rams had received approval to move to Los Angeles, they entered into negotiations to lease the Los Angeles Memorial Coliseum. The Rams were advised that a precondition to them getting a lease was that they would have to integrate the team with at least one African-American; the Rams agreed. Subsequently, the Rams signed Kenny Washington on March 21, 1946. The signing of Washington caused "all hell to break loose" among the owners of the NFL franchises. The Rams added a second black player, Woody Strode, on May 7, 1946, giving them two black players going into the 1946 season.

The Rams were the first team in the NFL to play in Los Angeles (the 1926 Los Angeles Buccaneers represented L.A. but were strictly a traveling team), but they were not the only professional football team to play its home games in the Coliseum between 1946 and 1949. The upstart All-America Football Conference had the Los Angeles Dons compete there as well. Reeves was taking a gamble that Los Angeles was ready for its own professional football team—and suddenly there were two in the City of Angels. Reeves was proven to be correct when the Rams played their first pre-season game against the Washington Redskins in front of a crowd of 95,000 fans. The team finished their first season in L.A. with a 6–4–1 record, second place behind the Chicago Bears. At the end of the season Walsh resigned as head coach. The Coliseum was home for the Rams for more than 30 years, but the facility was already over 20 years old on the day of the first kickoff. Bob Snyder coached the team for one season. In 1947, he led the team to a 6–6 record and a fourth-place finish in the NFC West.

In 1948, halfback Fred Gehrke painted horns on the Rams' helmets, making the first helmet emblem in pro football. In 1948, Clark Shaughnessy took over as head coach and led the team to a 6–5–1 record. Late in 1949, the Dons were folded into the Rams when the All-America Football Conference ceased operations.

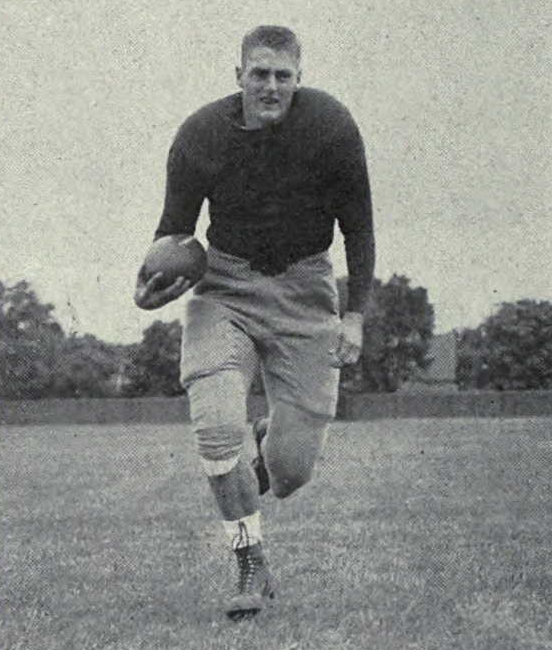
Elroy "Crazy Legs" Hirsch spent nine seasons with the Los Angeles Rams from 1949 to 1957

==== NFL champions (1951) ====
The Rams' heyday in Southern California was from 1949 to 1955, when they played in the pre-Super Bowl era NFL Championship Game four times, winning once in 1951. During this period, they had the best offense in the NFL, even though there was a quarterback change from Bob Waterfield to Norm Van Brocklin in 1951. The defining offensive players of this period were wide receiver Elroy Hirsch, running backs Paul "Tank" Younger, Dan Towler, Van Brocklin and Waterfield. Teamed with fellow Hall of Famer Tom Fears, Hirsch helped create the style of Rams football as one of the first big play receivers. During the 1951 championship season, Hirsch posted 1,495 receiving yards with 17 touchdowns. The popularity of this wide-open offense enabled the 1950 Los Angeles Rams to become the first professional football team to have all their games televised. They would continue their success within the decade with trading for players such as running back Ollie Matson.

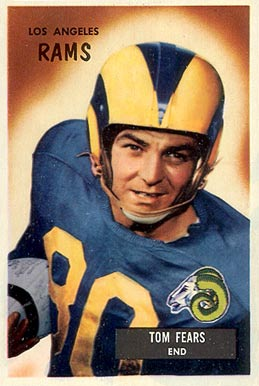
Hall of Fame WR Tom Fears attended Manual Arts High School (in Los Angeles) and UCLA.

In the late 1950s and early 1960s, the Rams went from being the only major professional sports franchise in Southern California and Los Angeles to being one of five. The Los Angeles Dodgers moved from Brooklyn in 1958, the Los Angeles Chargers of the upstart AFL was established in 1960, the Los Angeles Lakers moved from Minneapolis in 1960, and the Los Angeles Angels were awarded to Gene Autry in 1961. In spite of this, the Rams continued to thrive in Southern California. In the first two years after the Dodgers moved to California, the Rams drew an average of 83,681 in 1958 and 74,069 in 1959. The Rams were so popular in Los Angeles that the upstart Chargers chose to move to San Diego rather than attempt to compete with the Rams. The Los Angeles Times put the Chargers plight as such: "Hilton [the Chargers owner at the time] quickly realized that taking on the Rams in L.A. was like beating his head against the wall."

During this time, the team's combined record from 1957 to 1964 was 24–35–1 (.408), but the Rams continued to fill the cavernous Los Angeles Memorial Coliseum regularly. While the National Football League's average attendance ranged from the low 30,000s to the low 40,000s during this time, the Rams were drawing anywhere from 10,000 to 40,000 fans more than the league average. In 1957, the Rams set the all-time NFL attendance record that stood until 2006 and broke the 100,000 mark twice during the 1958 season.

The 1960s were defined by the defensive line of Rosey Grier, Merlin Olsen, Deacon Jones, and Lamar Lundy, dubbed the "Fearsome Foursome". It was this group of players who restored the on-field luster of the franchise in 1967 when the Rams reached (but lost) the conference championship under head coach George Allen. That 1967 squad also lead by Quarterback Roman Gabriel and wide receiver Bernie Casey, became the first NFL team to surpass one million spectators in a season, a feat the Rams repeated the following year. In each of those two years, the L.A. Rams drew roughly double the number of fans that could be accommodated by their current stadium for a full season.

George Allen led the Rams from 1966 to 1970 and introduced many innovations, including the hiring of a young Dick Vermeil as one of the first special teams coaches. Though Allen enjoyed five straight winning seasons and won two divisional titles in his time with the Rams, he never won a playoff game with the team, losing in 1967 to Green Bay 28–7 and in 1969 23–20 to Minnesota. Allen left after the 1970 season to take the head coaching job for the Washington Redskins.

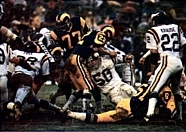
The Rams playing against the Vikings in the 1977 NFC Divisional Playoffs

Quarterback Roman Gabriel played 11 seasons for the Rams from 1962 to 1972. From 1967 to 1971, Gabriel led the Rams to either a first- or second-place finish in their division every year. He was voted the MVP of the NFL in 1969, for a season in which he threw for 2,549 yards and 24 TDs while leading the Rams to the playoffs. During the 1970 season, Gabriel combined with his primary receiver Jack Snow for 51 receptions totaling 859 yards. This was the best of their eight seasons as teammates.

In 1972, Chicago industrialist Robert Irsay purchased the Rams for $19 million and then traded the franchise to Carroll Rosenbloom for his Baltimore Colts and cash. The Rams remained solid contenders in the 1970s, winning seven straight NFC West championships between 1973 and 1979. Though they clearly were the class of the NFC in the 1970s along with the Dallas Cowboys and Minnesota Vikings, they lost the first four conference championship games they played in that decade, losing twice each to Minnesota (1974, 1976) and Dallas (1975, 1978) and failing to win a league championship.

==== Chuck Knox/Ray Malavasi years (1973–1982) ====
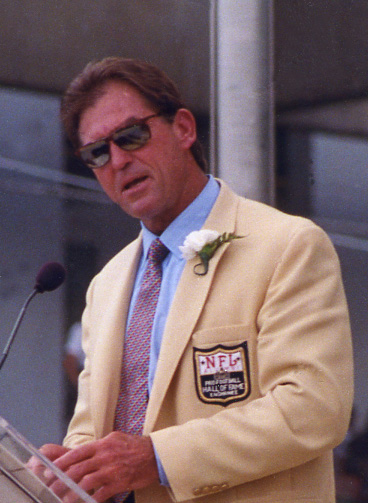
Jack Youngblood giving his Pro Football Hall of Fame induction speech in 2001

The Rams' head coach for this run was Chuck Knox, who led the team through 1977. His teams featured unremarkable offenses lead by quarterback James "Shack" Harris, carried into the playoffs annually by elite defensive units. The defining player of the 1970s Los Angeles Rams was Jack Youngblood. Youngblood was called the 'Perfect Defensive End' by fellow Hall of Famer Merlin Olsen. His toughness was legendary, notably playing on a broken leg during the Rams' run to the Super Bowl following the 1979 NFL season. His blue-collar ethic stood in opposition to the perception that the Rams were a soft 'Hollywood' team. However, several Rams players from this period took advantage of their proximity to Hollywood and crossed over into acting after their playing careers ended. Most notable of these was Fred Dryer, who starred in the TV series Hunter from 1984 to 1991, as well as Olsen, who retired after 1976, starred in Little House on the Prairie. During the 1977 off-season, the Rams, looking for a veteran quarterback, acquired Joe Namath from the Jets. In spite of a 2–1 start to the regular season, Namath's bad knees rendered him nearly immobile and after a Monday night defeat in Chicago, he never played again. With Pat Haden at the helm, the Rams won the division with a 10–4 record and advanced to the playoffs, but lost at home to Minnesota 14–7. Chuck Knox left for the Bills in 1978, after which Ray Malavasi became head coach. Going 12–4, the team won the NFC West for the sixth year in a row and defeated the Vikings, thus avenging their earlier playoff defeat. However, success eluded them again as they were shut out in the NFC Championship by the Cowboys.

It was the Rams' weakest divisional winner, an aging 1979 team with a 9–7 record, that achieved the team's greatest success in that period. Led by third-year quarterback Vince Ferragamo, the Rams shocked the heavily favored and two-time defending NFC champion Dallas Cowboys 21–19 in the divisional playoffs, then shut out the upstart Tampa Bay Buccaneers 9–0 in the conference championship game to win the NFC and reach their first Super Bowl. Along with Ferragamo, key players for the Rams were halfbacks Wendell Tyler and Lawrence McCutcheon, offensive linemen's Jackie Slater, Dennis Harrah and Kent Hill, defensive lineman Larry Brooks and Pro Bowl defenders Jack Youngblood, Jim Youngblood and Jack "Hacksaw" Reynolds.

The Rams' opponent in their first Super Bowl was the defending champion Pittsburgh Steelers. The game was a virtual home game for the Rams as it was played in Pasadena at the Rose Bowl. Although some oddsmakers set the Rams as a 10 1/2-point underdog, the Rams played Pittsburgh very tough, leading at halftime 13–10 and at the end of the third quarter 19–17. In the end, however, the Steelers asserted themselves, scoring two touchdowns in the fourth quarter and shutting down the Rams offense to win their fourth Super Bowl, 31–19.

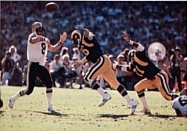
The Rams playing in their inaugural season at Anaheim Stadium in 1980.

Before the 1979 NFL season, owner Carroll Rosenbloom died in a drowning accident, and his widow, Georgia Frontiere, inherited 70 percent ownership of the team. Frontiere then fired stepson Steve Rosenbloom and assumed total control of Rams operations. As had been planned before Rosenbloom's death, the Rams moved from their longtime home at the Coliseum to Anaheim Stadium in nearby Orange County in 1980.

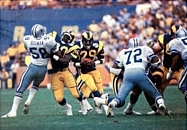
Dickerson (29) rushing through the Cowboys' defense in the 1985 NFC Divisional Playoff game.

The reason for the move was twofold. First, the NFL's blackout rule in effect then (repealed in 2015) forbade games from being shown on local television if they did not sell out within 72 hours of the opening kickoff. As the Los Angeles Memorial Coliseum seated 92,604 at the time, it was rarely possible to sell that many tickets even in the Rams' best years, and so most Rams home games were blacked out. Second, this move was following the population pattern in Southern California. During the 1970s and 1980s, the decline of manufacturing industries in the northeastern United States combined with the desire of many people to live in a warmer climate caused a large-scale population shift to the southern and western states. As a result, many affluent new suburbs were built in the Los Angeles area. Anaheim Stadium was originally built in 1966 to be the home of the California Angels. To accommodate the Rams' move, the ballpark was reconfigured and enclosed to accommodate a capacity of 69,008 in the football configuration. With their new, smaller home, the Rams had no problem selling out games.

In 1980, the team posted an 11–5 record, but only managed a wild card spot and were sent packing after a 34–13 loss to the Cowboys. Age and injuries finally caught up with the Rams in 1981, as they only won six games and missed the playoffs for the first time in nine years; adding to the woes was Ferragamo being wrested away by the CFL's Montreal Alouettes that year (although he returned the following season). After the 1982 season was shortened to nine games by a strike, the Rams went 2–7, the worst record in the NFC.

In 1982, the Oakland Raiders moved to Los Angeles and took up residence in the Los Angeles Memorial Coliseum. The combined effect of these two moves was to divide the Rams' traditional fan base in two. This was coupled with the early 1980s being rebuilding years for the club, while the Raiders were winners of Super Bowl XVIII in the 1983 season. Meanwhile, in the NBA the Los Angeles Lakers won championships in 1980 and 1982 en route to winning five titles in that decade, in MLB the Los Angeles Dodgers won the World Series in 1981 and 1988, and even in the NHL the Los Angeles Kings made a deep run in the playoffs in 1982, and acquired fan interest following the arrival of Wayne Gretzky in 1988. As a result, the Rams declined sharply in popularity during the 1980s, despite being playoff contenders for most of the decade.

==== John Robinson years (1983–1991) ====
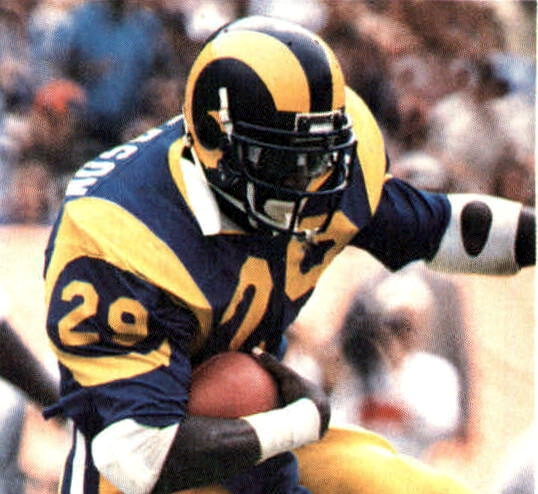
Eric Dickerson, one of the best running backs in history, was most famous for his time with the Los Angeles Rams. In 1984, Dickerson rushed for 2,105 yards in the season, a record that still stands today.

The hiring of coach John Robinson in 1983 provided a needed boost for pro football in Orange County. The former University of Southern California coach began by cutting the aged veterans left over from the 1970s teams. His rebuilding program began to show results when the team rebounded to 9–7 in 1983 and defeated Dallas in the playoffs. However, the season ended after a rout at the hands of the defending champion Redskins. Another trip to the playoffs in 1984 saw them lose to the Giants. They made the NFC Championship Game in 1985 after winning the division, where they were shut out by the eventual champion Chicago Bears 24–0.

The most notable player for the Rams during that period was running back Eric Dickerson, who was drafted in 1983 out of Southern Methodist University and won the Rookie of the Year award. In 1984, Dickerson rushed for 2,105 yards, setting an NFL record. Dickerson ended his five hugely successful years for the Rams in 1987 by being traded to the Indianapolis Colts for a number of players and draft picks after a bitter contract dispute, shortly after the players' strike that year ended. Dickerson was the Rams' career rushing leader until 2010, with 7,245 yards. Despite this trade, the Rams remained contenders due to the arrival of the innovative offensive leadership of Ernie Zampese. Zampese brought the intricate timing routes he had used in making the San Diego Chargers a state-of-the-art offense. Under Zampese, the Rams rose steadily from 28th rated offense in 1986 to 3rd in 1990. The late 1980s Rams featured a gifted young quarterback in Jim Everett, a solid rushing attack in running back Greg Bell and a fleet of talented wide receivers led by Henry Ellard, Ron Brown and Flipper Anderson.

After a 10–6 season in 1986, the Rams were booted from the playoffs by Washington. After one game of the 1987 season was lost to the players' strike, the NFL employed substitutes (with most notably players as Marion Knight and Danny Lee Clark) which most of which were given derogatory nicknames (in this case the Los Angeles Shams). After a 2–1 record, the Rams' regulars returned, but the team only went 6–9 and did not qualify for the postseason.

The Rams managed to return in 1988 with a 10–6 record, but then were defeated by Minnesota in the wild card round. Los Angeles won the first five games of 1989, including a sensational defeat of the defending champion 49ers. They beat the Eagles in the wild card game, then beat the Giants in overtime before suffering a 30–3 flogging at the hands of the 49ers in the NFC Championship Game.

Although it was not apparent at the time, the 1989 NFC Championship Game was the end of an era. The Rams did not have another winning season for the rest of their first tenure in Los Angeles before moving to St. Louis. They crumbled to 5–11 in 1990, followed by a 3–13 season in 1991.

==== Chuck Knox returns (1992–1994) ====
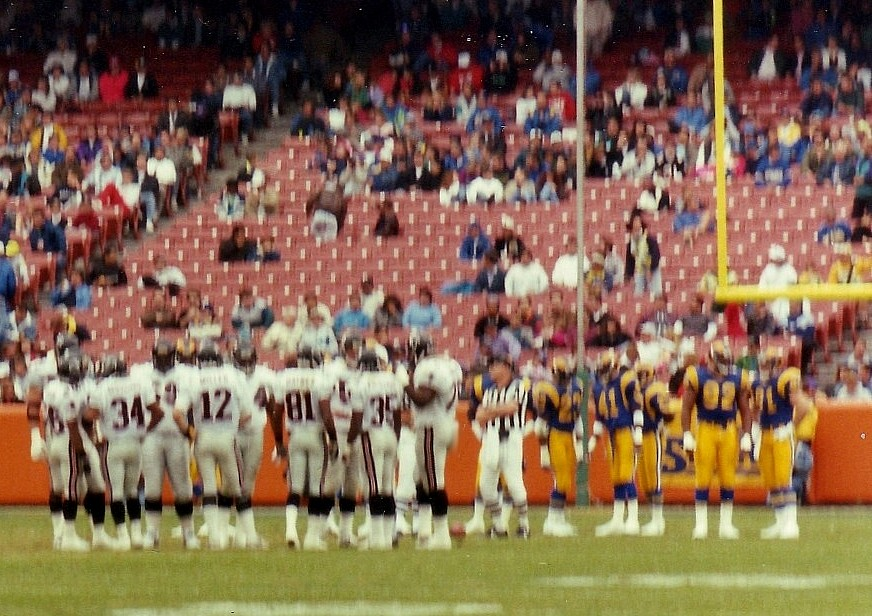
The Rams hosting the Atlanta Falcons at Anaheim Stadium in 1991

Robinson resigned at the end of the 1991 season. However, the return of Chuck Knox as head coach, after his successful stints as head coach of the Buffalo Bills and Seattle Seahawks, did not boost the Rams' sagging fortunes. In his first season back, he led the team to a 6–10 record in 1992. His run-oriented offense marked the end of the Zampese tenure with a 5–11 record in 1993. Knox's game plans called for an offense that was steady, if unspectacular. Unfortunately for the Rams, Knox's offense was not only aesthetically unpleasing but dull as well, especially by 1990s standards. The Rams finished last in the NFC West during all three years of Knox's second stint.

As the losses piled up and the team was seen as playing uninspired football, the Rams' already dwindling fan base was reduced even further. By 1994, support for the Rams had withered to the point where they were barely part of the Los Angeles sports landscape. With sellouts becoming fewer and far between, the Rams saw more of their games blacked out in Southern California. One of the few bright spots during this time was Jerome Bettis, a bruising running back from Notre Dame earning the nickname "The Battering Ram". Bettis flourished as the only bright spot in Knox's offense, running for 1,429 yards as a rookie, and 1,025 in his sophomore effort.

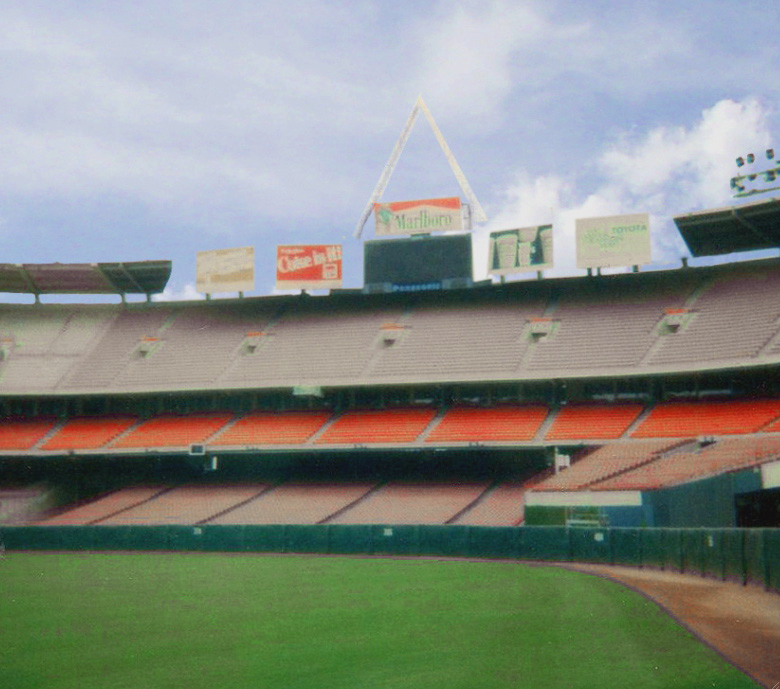
Anaheim Stadium, the home of the Los Angeles Rams from 1980 to 1994

As had become increasingly common with sports franchises, the Rams began to blame much of their misfortune on their stadium situation. Anaheim Stadium was primarily suited for baseball, so the sightlines for football were deemed inadequate. With Orange County mired in a deep recession resulting largely from defense sector layoffs, the Rams were unable to secure a new or improved stadium in the Los Angeles area, which ultimately cast their future in Southern California into doubt.

By 1995, the Rams fanbase in Southern California had withered to a shadow of its former self. Accusations and excuses were constantly thrown back and forth between the Rams fanbase, ownership, and local politicians. Many fans heavily blamed the ownership of Georgia Frontiere for the franchise's woes, while ownership cited the outdated stadium and withering fan support as direct factors.

Frontiere quickly gave up and decided to move the Rams franchise to St. Louis. However, on March 15, 1995, the other league owners rejected her bid to move the franchise by a 21–3–6 vote. Commissioner Paul Tagliabue stated after rejecting the move, "This was one of the most complex issues we have had to approach in years. We had to balance the interest of fans in Los Angeles and in St. Louis that we appreciate very much. In my judgment, they did not meet the guidelines we have in place for such a move." The commissioner also added: "Once the bridges have been burned and people get turned off on a sports franchise, years of loyalty is not respected and it is difficult to get it back. By the same token, there are millions of fans in that area who have supported the Rams in an extraordinary way. The Rams have 50 years of history and the last 5 or so years of difficult times can be corrected."

However, Frontiere responded with a thinly veiled threat at a lawsuit. The owners eventually acquiesced to her demands, wary of going through a long, protracted legal battle. Tagliabue simply stated that "The desire to have peace and not be at war was a big factor" in allowing the Rams move to go forward. In a matter of a month, the vote had gone from 21–6 opposed to 23–6 in favor, with the Raiders, who left the Coliseum and returned to Oakland later in 1995, abstaining. Jonathan Kraft, son of Patriots owner Robert Kraft, elaborated on the commissioner's remarks by saying that "about five or six owners didn't want to get the other owners into litigation, so they switched their votes." Only six franchises remained in opposition to the Rams move from Los Angeles: the Pittsburgh Steelers, New York Giants, New York Jets, Buffalo Bills, Arizona Cardinals (who played in St. Louis from 1960 to 1987), and Washington Redskins. After the vote was over, Dan Rooney publicly stated that he opposed the move of the Los Angeles Rams because "I believe we should support the fans who have supported us for years."

=== St. Louis Rams (1995–2015) ===
The 1995 and 1996 seasons, the Rams' first two in St. Louis, were under the direction of former Oregon Ducks head coach Rich Brooks. The team went 7–9 in 1995 and 6–10 in 1996. Their most prolific player from their first two seasons was the fan favorite Isaac Bruce.

==== Dick Vermeil/Mike Martz years (1997–2005) ====
In 1997, Dick Vermeil was hired as the head coach. That same year, the Rams traded up in the 1997 NFL draft to select future All-Pro offensive tackle, Orlando Pace. The team would struggle to find success in the first two seasons with Vermeil under the helm, going 5–11 in 1997 and 4–12 in 1998.

===== Super Bowl XXXIV champions (1999) =====
The 1999 season started with quarterback Trent Green injuring his leg in preseason play, which left him sidelined for the entire season; the starting job fell to backup Kurt Warner, who came out of college as an undrafted free agent and whose career had included stints with the Iowa Barnstormers of the Arena Football League and the Amsterdam Admirals of NFL Europe. Vermeil told the public that the Rams would "Rally around Kurt Warner, and play good football." Warner synced up with Marshall Faulk, Isaac Bruce, Torry Holt, Az-Zahir Hakim and Roland Williams to lead the Rams to one of the most prolific offenses in history, posting 526 points for the season. This was the beginning of what later became known as "The Greatest Show on Turf". Warner shocked the league by throwing for 41 touchdowns. This led the Rams to Super Bowl XXXIV, where they beat the Tennessee Titans, 23–16. Warner was named the Most Valuable Player of the Super Bowl.

Following the Rams' win, Vermeil retired, and Vermeil's offensive coordinator Mike Martz was hired as head coach. He managed to take the Rams to Super Bowl XXXVI, where the team lost to the New England Patriots, 20–17. Martz helped the Rams establish a pass-first identity that posted an NFL record number of points over the course of three seasons (1999–2001). However, in the first round in the 2004 draft, the Rams chose Oregon State running back Steven Jackson as the 24th pick of the draft.

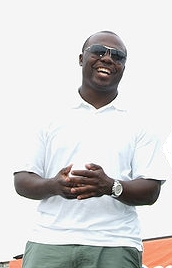
Marshall Faulk's running abilities, combined with Kurt Warner passing to Isaac Bruce, Torry Holt, and others, forged The Greatest Show on Turf.

Although the Rams were one of the most productive teams in NFL history at the time, head coach Martz was criticized by many as careless with game management. He often feuded with several players as well as team president and general manager, Jay Zygmunt. However, most of his players respected him and went on record saying that they enjoyed him as a coach. In 2005, Martz was ill, and was hospitalized for several games, allowing assistant head coach Joe Vitt to coach the remainder of the season. Although Martz was cleared later in the season, team president John Shaw did not allow him to come back to coach the team. After the Rams fired Martz, former Minnesota offensive coordinator Scott Linehan took control of an 8–8 team in 2006. In 2007, Linehan led the Rams to a 3–13 record.

Following the 2007 season, Georgia Frontiere died on January 18, 2008, after a 28-year ownership that began in 1979. Ownership of the team passed to her son Dale "Chip" Rosenbloom and daughter Lucia Rodriguez. Chip Rosenbloom was named the new Rams majority owner. Linehan was already faced with scrutiny from several players in the locker room, including Torry Holt and Steven Jackson. Linehan was then fired on September 29, 2008, after the team started the season 0–4. Jim Haslett, defensive coordinator under Linehan, was interim head coach for the rest of the 2008 season.

John Shaw then resigned as president, and personnel chief Billy Devaney was promoted to general manager on December 24, 2008, after the resignation of former president of football operations and general manager Jay Zygmunt on December 22.

On January 17, 2009, Steve Spagnuolo was named the new head coach of the franchise. In his previous post as defensive coordinator with the New York Giants, Spagnuolo masterminded a defensive scheme that shut down the potent offense of the previously undefeated and untied New England Patriots, the odds on favorite to win the Super Bowl that year. In one of the greatest upsets in Super Bowl history, the New York Giants defeated the Patriots, 17–14. In spite of his success as defensive coordinator with the Giants, Spagnuolo's first season as head coach of the Rams was disappointing as the team won only once in 16 attempts.

On May 31, 2009, the St. Louis Post-Dispatch reported that the majority owners Rosenbloom and Rodriguez officially offered their majority share of Rams for sale. They retained the services of Goldman Sachs, a prominent investment banking firm, to help facilitate the sale of the Rams by evaluating bids and soliciting potential buyers. The sale price was unknown, but at the time Forbes magazine's most recent estimate listed the Rams' value at $929 million. On the final day to do so, then-minority owner Stan Kroenke invoked his right of first refusal to buy the 60% of the team that he did not already own. The original intended buyer, Shahid Khan, later acquired the Jacksonville Jaguars after the 2011 season. Pursuant to NFL rules, owners are prohibited from owning other sports teams in markets where there is already an NFL team. At the time of purchase, Kroenke (d/b/a Kroenke Sports Enterprises) owned the Denver Nuggets, the Colorado Avalanche, the Colorado Rapids, and the Pepsi Center (home to the Nuggets and the Avalanche). Kroenke, a real estate and sports mogul married to a Walmart heir, also owned Altitude Sports and Entertainment. These interests violated the NFL's cross-ownership rule. Nevertheless, on August 25, 2010, NFL owners unanimously approved him as the owner of the franchise contingent upon his eventual divestment of his Colorado sports interests. Kroenke complied with the rule when he transferred ownership of the Nuggets, Avalanche, the Pepsi Center, and the Altitude to his son Josh Kroenke.

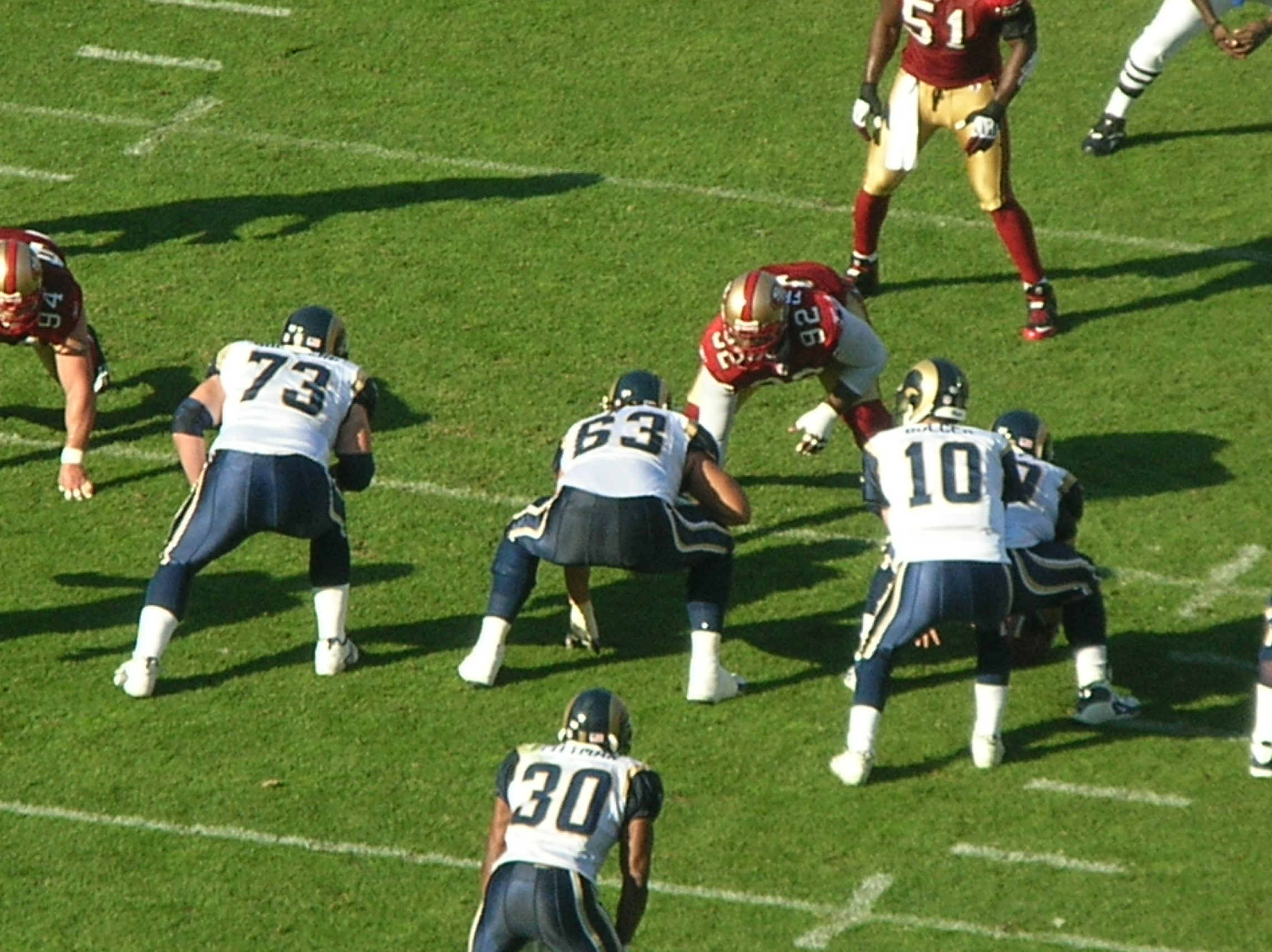
The St. Louis Rams on offense during an away game against the San Francisco 49ers

The Rams received the first pick in the 2010 NFL draft after finishing the 2009 season with a 1–15 record. The team used the pick to select quarterback Sam Bradford from the University of Oklahoma. The Rams finished the 2010 season second in the NFC West with a record of 7–9. Bradford started all 16 games for the Rams after earning the starting position during the preseason. On October 24, 2010, running back Steven Jackson passed Eric Dickerson as the franchise's career rushing leader.

On February 4, 2011, Bradford was named the NFL's Offensive Rookie of the Year. He received 44 out of 50 possible votes from the nationwide panel of media members. The team and fans held high expectations for the upcoming season, but due to injuries to starters and poor execution, the Rams fell to a 2–14 record for the 2011 season. On January 2, 2012, head coach Spagnuolo and general manager Devaney were fired. McDaniels also left the team and returned to New England to become their offensive coordinator for the 2012 season.

Under the terms of the lease that the Rams signed in St. Louis, the Edward Jones Dome was required to be ranked in the top tier of NFL stadiums through the 2015 season. The Rams were free to break the lease and either move without penalty or continue to lease the dome on a year-to-year basis. In May 2012, the dome was ranked by Time magazine as the 7th worst major sports stadium in the United States. In a 2008 Sports Illustrated poll, St. Louis fans ranked it the worst of any NFL stadium with particularly low marks for tailgating, affordability and atmosphere.

On January 20, 2012, it was announced that the Rams would play one home game a season at Wembley Stadium in London for each of the next three seasons. The first game was played against the New England Patriots on October 28, 2012. On August 13, 2012, it was announced that the Rams had withdrawn from the 2013 and 2014 games. At this time, the Rams began negotiations with St. Louis about what steps could be taken to remediate the "top tier" requirement of the lease.

On March 10, 2015, the Rams traded starting quarterback Sam Bradford and a 2015 fifth-round pick to the Philadelphia Eagles in exchange for Eagles' quarterback Nick Foles, a 2015 fourth-round pick, and a second-round pick in 2016. Foles had a 14–4 record as starter of the Eagles and an impressive touchdown to interception ratio of 46–17, while Bradford had an 18–30–1 record with the Rams. In the 2015 NFL draft the Rams drafted Georgia Bulldogs running back Todd Gurley. After Gurley was drafted, the Rams traded Zac Stacy to the New York Jets on May 2 for a 7th-round pick. Stacy had led the team in rushing in 2013.

The stadium "top tier" negotiations failed to produce a solution to keep the Rams in St. Louis for the long term. On December 17, 2015, the Rams defeated the Tampa Bay Buccaneers 31–23 in their final home game in St. Louis; their last game as the St. Louis Rams came two weeks later on the road against the San Francisco 49ers before moving back to Los Angeles for the 2016 season. Fans in St. Louis claimed Kroenke, a Missouri native, as well as Kevin Demoff, lied to the fans about their wishes to keep the Rams in St. Louis. In his final years, Kroenke was referred to as "Silent Stan" since he refused to speak about the team and the potential move. In a last-ditch effort, St. Louis came up with a viable stadium plan to keep the team, but the NFL and the Rams' position was that the Rams followed the agreed-upon remediation process laid out in the Edward Jones Dome lease, and that St. Louis' hastily put together plan shifted too much of the stadium cost to the Rams franchise. Ultimately, the other NFL teams' owners voted to allow the Rams to move to Los Angeles.

=== Return to Los Angeles (2016–present) ===
On January 5, 2015, the Los Angeles Times reported that Kroenke and the Stockbridge Capital Group were partnering to develop a new NFL stadium on an Inglewood property owned by Kroenke. On February 24, 2015, the Inglewood City Council approved the stadium and the initiative with construction on the stadium planned to begin in December 2015. The Rams moved to their new stadium in Inglewood in 2020.

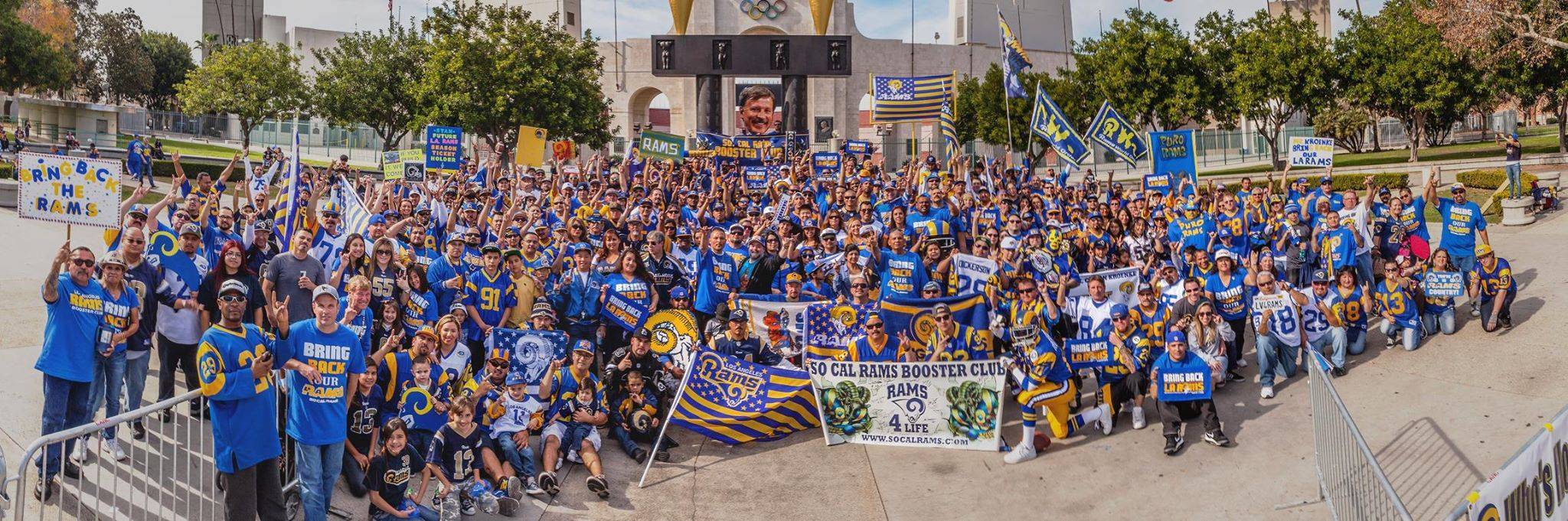
Rally held at the Los Angeles Memorial Coliseum in support of the Rams moving back to Los Angeles

The day following the conclusion of the 2015 regular season, the Rams, Oakland Raiders, and San Diego Chargers all filed to move to Los Angeles. The same day, the NFL announced that any franchise that decided to move would have to pay a $550 million fee. On January 12, 2016, the NFL team owners voted 30–2 to allow the Rams to return to Los Angeles. The Rams were the first major league sports team to move since 2011 when the National Hockey League's Atlanta Thrashers left Atlanta and became the new Winnipeg Jets. The team held a press conference at The Forum in Inglewood on January 15, 2016, to announce its return to Los Angeles to start play in the 2016 season and on that day the Rams began a campaign that lasted through February 8 and resulted in more than 56,000 season ticket deposits made. The Los Angeles Memorial Coliseum was the temporary home stadium of the Rams for four seasons (2016 to 2019) until SoFi Stadium was opened for the 2020 season.

On February 4, 2016, the Los Angeles Rams selected Oxnard to be the site of their minicamp, off-season team activities, and off-season program that began on April 18. In March, it was announced that the Rams would be featured on HBO's Hard Knocks. On March 30, California Lutheran University and the Rams reached an agreement that allowed the team to have regular season training operations at CLU's campus for the next two years. The Rams paid for two practice fields, paved parking, and modular buildings constructed on the northwestern corner of the campus.

On April 14, 2016, the Rams traded with the Tennessee Titans for the first overall pick in the 2016 NFL draft, along with a fourth and sixth-round pick in the same draft. To acquire the picks, the Rams traded away their first-round pick, two second-round picks, and a third-round pick in 2016, and their first and third-round picks in the 2017 NFL draft. On April 28, 2016, the Rams made their first selection in the 2016 NFL draft by selecting California quarterback Jared Goff first overall.

In June 2016, it was reported that the Rams had sold 63,000 season tickets, which was short of their goal of 70,000. Later on July 12, 2016, it was reported that they had sold 70,000 tickets, reaching their goal. In July 2016, the Rams signed a three-year agreement with UC Irvine to use the university's facilities for training camp, with an option to extend it to two more years. On July 29, 2016, the Los Angeles Times reported that the Rams would host their first training-camp practice and "Rams Family Day" on Saturday, August 6 at the Los Angeles Memorial Coliseum, which was open to the public.

The Rams played their first game in the Los Angeles area since 1994, a 22-year absence, with a preseason opener against the Dallas Cowboys at the Los Angeles Memorial Coliseum on August 13. The Rams won, 28–24, in front of a crowd of 89,140, a record attendance for a pre-season game.

On September 12, 2016, the Rams played their first regular-season game since returning to Los Angeles, where they lost to the San Francisco 49ers 28–0 at Levi's Stadium. On September 18, in front of over 91,000 fans at the Los Angeles Memorial Coliseum, the Rams beat the Seattle Seahawks 9–3 in their first home regular-season game in Los Angeles since 1994, and their first game at the Coliseum since 1979.

On December 12, 2016, the team fired head coach Jeff Fisher after starting the season 4–9. The team announced later that day that John Fassel would be taking over as interim head coach.

==== Sean McVay era (2017–present) ====
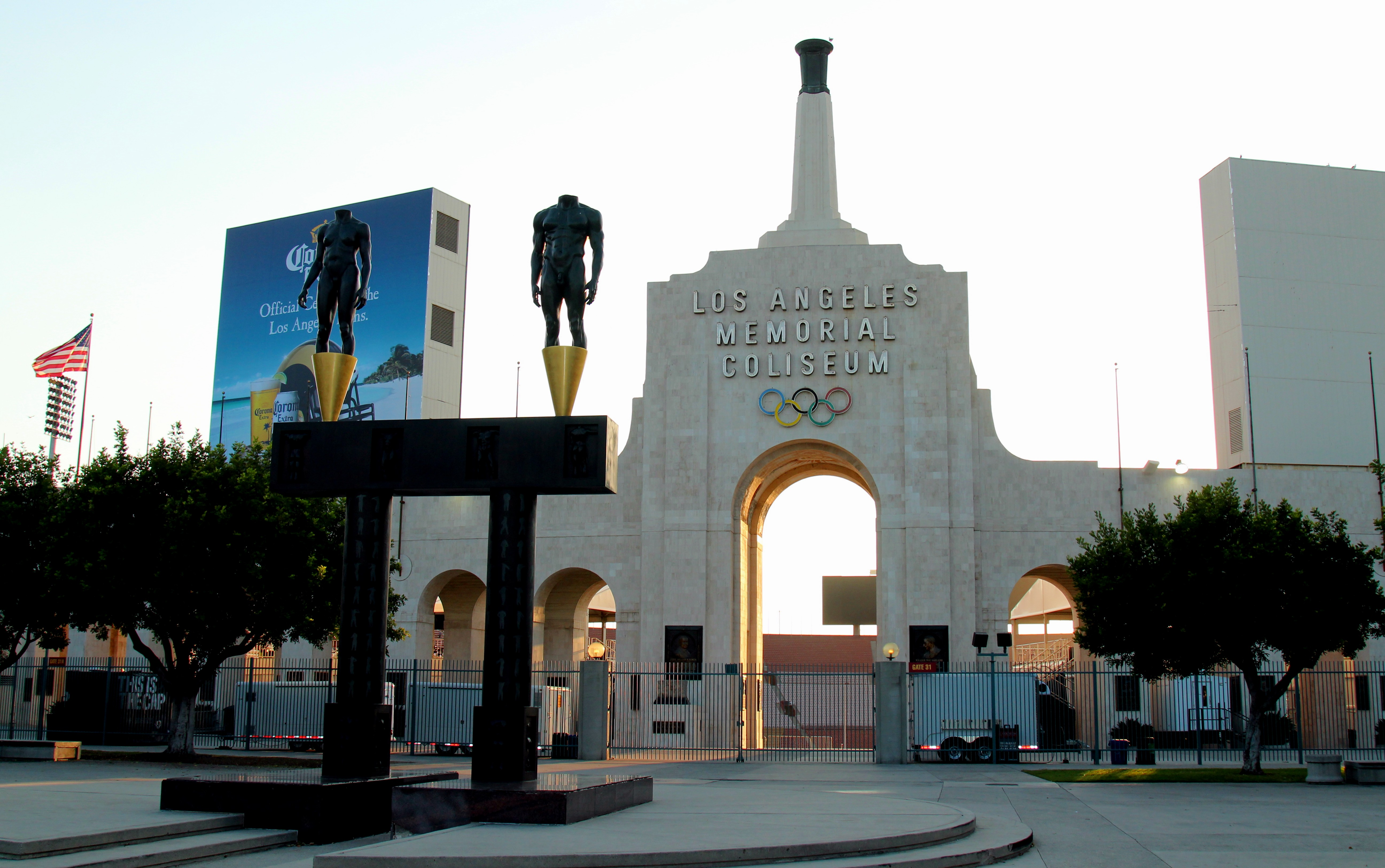
The Rams used the Los Angeles Memorial Coliseum as their home stadium from 2016 to 2019

On January 12, 2017, Washington Redskins offensive coordinator Sean McVay became the new head coach at the age of 30, which made him the youngest in modern NFL history, surpassing Lane Kiffin who was 31 when hired by the Oakland Raiders in 2007.

The Rams began the year 3–2, much like their previous season in Los Angeles, then won four games in a row, blowing out the Arizona Cardinals and New York Giants. The season saw the resurgence of Jared Goff and Todd Gurley after mediocre 2016 seasons, while new acquisitions Sammy Watkins, Robert Woods, Nickell Robey-Coleman and draft selection Cooper Kupp at wide receiver had analysts comparing the 2017 Rams to the "Greatest Show on Turf" Rams of the late 1990s and early 2000s.

On November 26, 2017, the Rams defeated the rival New Orleans Saints, 26–20. The eighth win of the season secured the franchise's first non-losing year since 2006 and their first in Los Angeles since 1989. A week later, the Rams defeated the Cardinals 32–16 to secure a winning season for the first time since 2003. On December 24, 2017, the Rams defeated the Tennessee Titans 27–23 to clinch their first NFC West title since 2003, and their first in Los Angeles since 1985; they finished the regular season, 11–5. The team lost in the first round of the playoffs, 26–13, to the defending conference champion Atlanta Falcons. But the season represented a turnaround: after scoring a league-worst 224 points in 2016, the Rams led the league in points scored with 478, the fourth-most in team history.

In the 2018 off-season, the Rams acquired Marcus Peters from the Kansas City Chiefs. The team dealt Robert Quinn to the Miami Dolphins and Alec Ogletree to the New York Giants, and lost Trumaine Johnson to the New York Jets in free agency before trading for five-time Pro Bowler Aqib Talib from the Denver Broncos. The team continued building its pass rush by signing free agent Ndamukong Suh. Many experts and analysts began to label the Rams as a serious Super Bowl contender, and the Rams continued to build for a deep postseason run by picking up wide receiver Brandin Cooks in a trade with the New England Patriots, which replaced the loss of Sammy Watkins to the Chiefs in free agency. The Rams then signed Cooks and running back Todd Gurley to five-year extensions, and offensive tackle Rob Havenstein to a four-year extension. The Rams ended their off-season by signing defensive tackle Aaron Donald, who held out so long that he missed training camp for a second straight season. His six-year, $135 million contract made him the highest-paid defensive player in NFL history, a record broken the following day when the Chicago Bears signed newly acquired Khalil Mack to a $141 million extension.

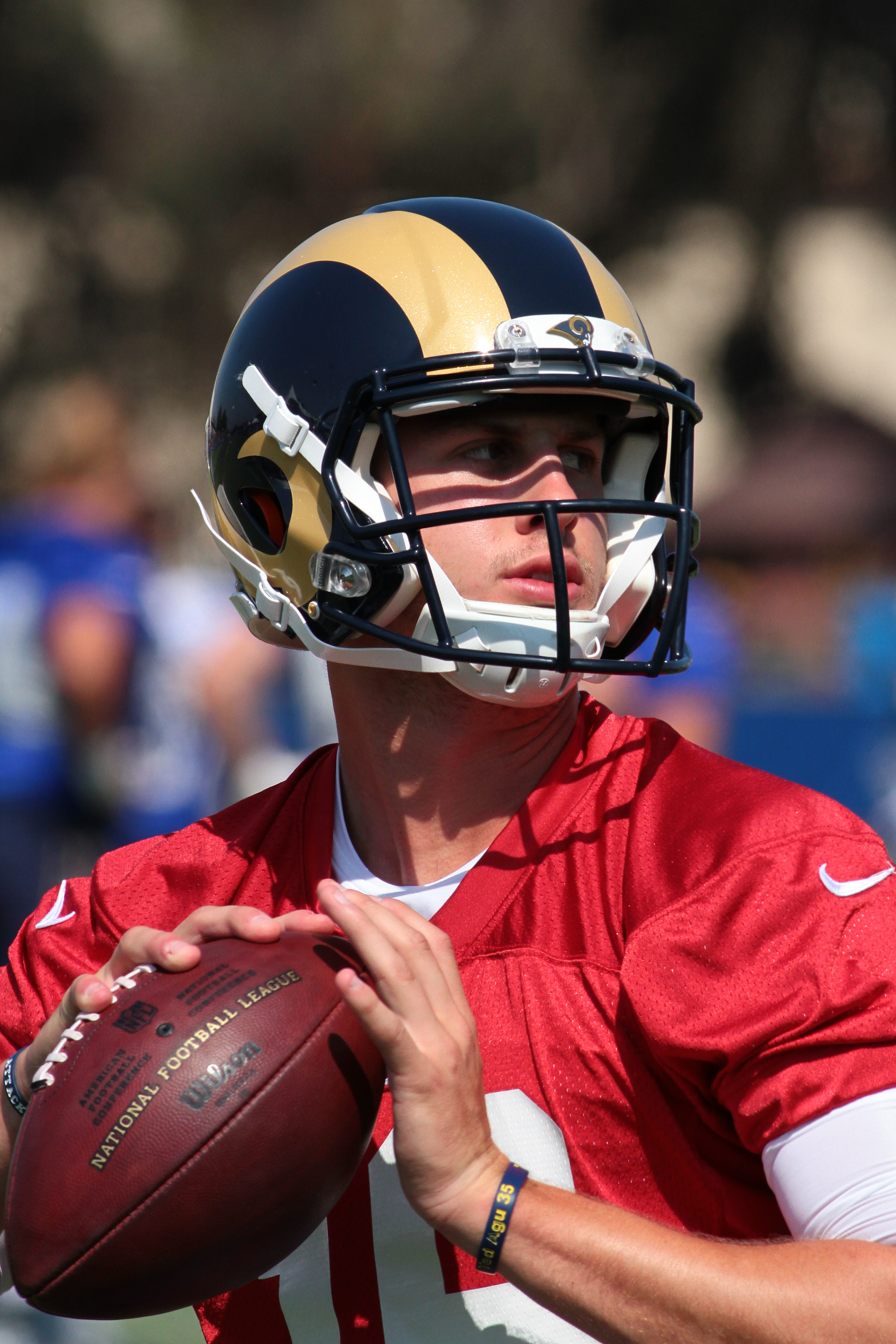
QB Jared Goff, 2016–2020

The Rams opened their 2018 season on September 10 by defeating the Oakland Raiders 33–13 on Monday Night Football, scoring 23 unanswered second-half points in a game during which head coach McVay took on his former mentor, Jon Gruden, who was making his return to coaching. It was the first of two Monday Night Football appearances for the Rams in the season. The Rams continued their strong start with three straight wins at the Los Angeles Memorial Coliseum, shutting out the Arizona Cardinals 34–0 in their home opener in Week 2, defeating the Los Angeles Chargers 35–23 in Week 3 and beating the Minnesota Vikings 38–31 on Thursday Night Football. Los Angeles then went three-for-three on the road at Seattle (33–31), Denver (23–20), and San Francisco (39–10). Returning home in Week 8, Los Angeles rallied to defeat the Green Bay Packers 29–27 to improve to 8–0, their best start since 1969. The Rams were the only remaining undefeated team in the NFL when they lost on the road to the New Orleans Saints in Week 9. The Rams bounced back with three straight wins, defeating the Seattle Seahawks 36–31, and then winning a wild 54–51 shootout against the Kansas City Chiefs on Monday Night Football. Following a bye week, the Rams beat the host Detroit Lions 30–16 in Week 13 to clinch both a playoff berth and their second straight NFC West title. Los Angeles then stumbled with back-to-back losses to the Chicago Bears and Philadelphia Eagles, and in the latter of those two games, franchise running back Todd Gurley suffered a leg injury that later led to inflammation, forcing him to miss the Rams' final two regular-season games, but the team finished strong with victories over the Arizona Cardinals and San Francisco 49ers to clinch a first-round bye. The Rams' 13–3 record tied for the second-most wins in a single season in franchise history and were the most ever for any NFL team in Los Angeles.

The Rams began their playoff run by defeating the Dallas Cowboys 30–22 in the divisional round to head to the NFC Championship Game for the first time since January 2002. The following week, the Rams beat the Saints on the road 26–23 to advance to the Super Bowl for the first time since Super Bowl XXXVI in January 2002, and since Super Bowl XIV in January 1980 as a Los Angeles team. The game featured a controversial ending: on a third-down play inside the final two minutes with the score tied at 20, Rams cornerback Nickell Robey-Coleman made contact with Saints receiver Tommylee Lewis well before a pass from Saints quarterback Drew Brees had arrived. Additionally, Robey-Coleman delivered a helmet-to-helmet hit; however, no flag was thrown for pass interference or the illegal hit, leading to outrage from Saints players and fans as this denied New Orleans a first down, which would have likely put the game out of reach. After the game, there was speculation but no clear video evidence that the pass was tipped.

The Rams lost in Super Bowl LIII held at the Mercedes-Benz Stadium in Atlanta, Georgia, to the New England Patriots by a score of 13–3 in the lowest-scoring Super Bowl in history. It was the first time in 35 years that a Los Angeles team was featured in a Super Bowl.

Rumors in the offseason swirled around Gurley and his knee injury, as despite a strong performance in the divisional round against the Cowboys, Gurley's performances in the NFC Championship and Super Bowl LIII were lackluster, and it was later reported after the Super Bowl that Gurley had arthritis in his knee. Nevertheless, Gurley would attempt to play a full slate in 2019. Meanwhile, the Rams' biggest free agency losses included offensive linemen Rodger Saffold and John Sullivan, and defensive lineman Ndamukong Suh departed for Tampa Bay. Los Angeles's notable acquisitions during free agency included linebacker Clay Matthews III and safety Eric Weddle.

The Rams opened their NFC title defense with a close victory over the Carolina Panthers, 30–27, and then defeated the Saints 27–9 in a highly anticipated rematch of the previous NFC Championship Game. Los Angeles then won their third straight game, a tight battle with the Cleveland Browns, though quarterback Jared Goff seemed to struggle. Goff's struggles continued into the following week, where the Rams would lose a wild, high-scoring duel with the Buccaneers 40–55. Safety John Johnson, who was one of the team's strongest defensive players, suffered a season-ending injury in the loss. The Rams then met the divisional rival Seahawks on Thursday Night Football, in what was another extremely tight game which saw Clay Matthews flagged for a controversial roughing-the-passer penalty on Seattle quarterback Russell Wilson, which kept Seattle's eventual winning drive alive. Greg Zuerlein then missed a last-second field goal, which lost the game for the Rams by one point, 29–30.

Gurley, who had suffered a quad injury against Seattle, would miss the Rams' Week 6 bout with the 49ers, in addition to Matthews and other key members of the Rams' offensive line. The depleted Rams lost 20–7, a game in which Goff was held to a career-low 78 yards passing and took four sacks. Two days after the loss, cornerback Marcus Peters was traded to the Baltimore Ravens in exchange for linebacker Kenny Young. Los Angeles then traded two first-round picks and a fourth-round pick to the Jacksonville Jaguars in exchange for Pro Bowl cornerback Jalen Ramsey, who contributed well despite playing on a snap count in the Rams' 37–10 victory over the Falcons. The Rams defeated the Cincinnati Bengals 24–10 in London before dropping a low-scoring battle with the Pittsburgh Steelers 17–12. Between the games against the Bengals and Steelers, Aqib Talib, who was on injured reserve, was traded to the Miami Dolphins. Throughout the season, the Rams' offensive line had taken multiple injuries, which led to second-string players such as Bobby Evans and David Edwards getting playing time in the latter half of the year. The Rams, who were also missing wide receiver Robert Woods for a week, defeated the Bears 17–7 at home before being dismantled by the Ravens 45–6, with Baltimore scoring touchdowns on their first six drives while Goff and Gurley, the latter of whom had been limited throughout the season, continued to struggle. Los Angeles responded with a 34–7 rout over the Cardinals, where rookie safety Taylor Rapp notched his first career interception, which he returned for a touchdown, while Goff threw his first passing touchdown in a month after going all of November without a single one. The team then turned in one of their strongest first-half performances of the year in a 28–12 victory over the Seahawks, in what was the final primetime NFL game at the Los Angeles Memorial Coliseum. The Rams, however, were unable to keep their momentum in a 21–44 loss to the Dallas Cowboys, dealing the team a devastating blow to their playoff chances and forcing them into a must-win game against the 49ers. The Rams led late in the game, but the 49ers won the wild affair 34–31 via a field goal after a miscommunication between Ramsey and Rapp on the final drive of the game led to a blown coverage, which put San Francisco in scoring position. The loss eliminated the Rams from playoff contention, denying them an opportunity to repeat as NFC Champions. In their final game at the Los Angeles Memorial Coliseum, the team went out on a high note, defeating the Cardinals 31–24.

Like the rest of the NFL, the Rams were forced to navigate a difficult offseason when the global COVID-19 pandemic struck, meaning offseason free-agent visits, college player visits, the Draft, and other team activities were conducted virtually, and there was no preseason. In free agency, the Rams chose to release Todd Gurley after his lackluster 2019, where he finished with career-lows in touchdowns and rushing yards after being limited by his knee injury. The Rams also traded Brandin Cooks, whose concussions kept him out of multiple games the previous year. The team filled those holes by drafting running back Cam Akers and receiver Van Jefferson. However, the Rams lost Cory Littleton and Dante Fowler in free agency, and were set to lose Michael Brockers to the Ravens until a failed physical allowed him to return to Los Angeles on a 3-year deal. Kicker Greg Zuerlein also departed, signing with the Cowboys. One week before the start of the season, Jalen Ramsey was signed to a 5-year, $102 million deal, making him the highest-paid cornerback in league history.

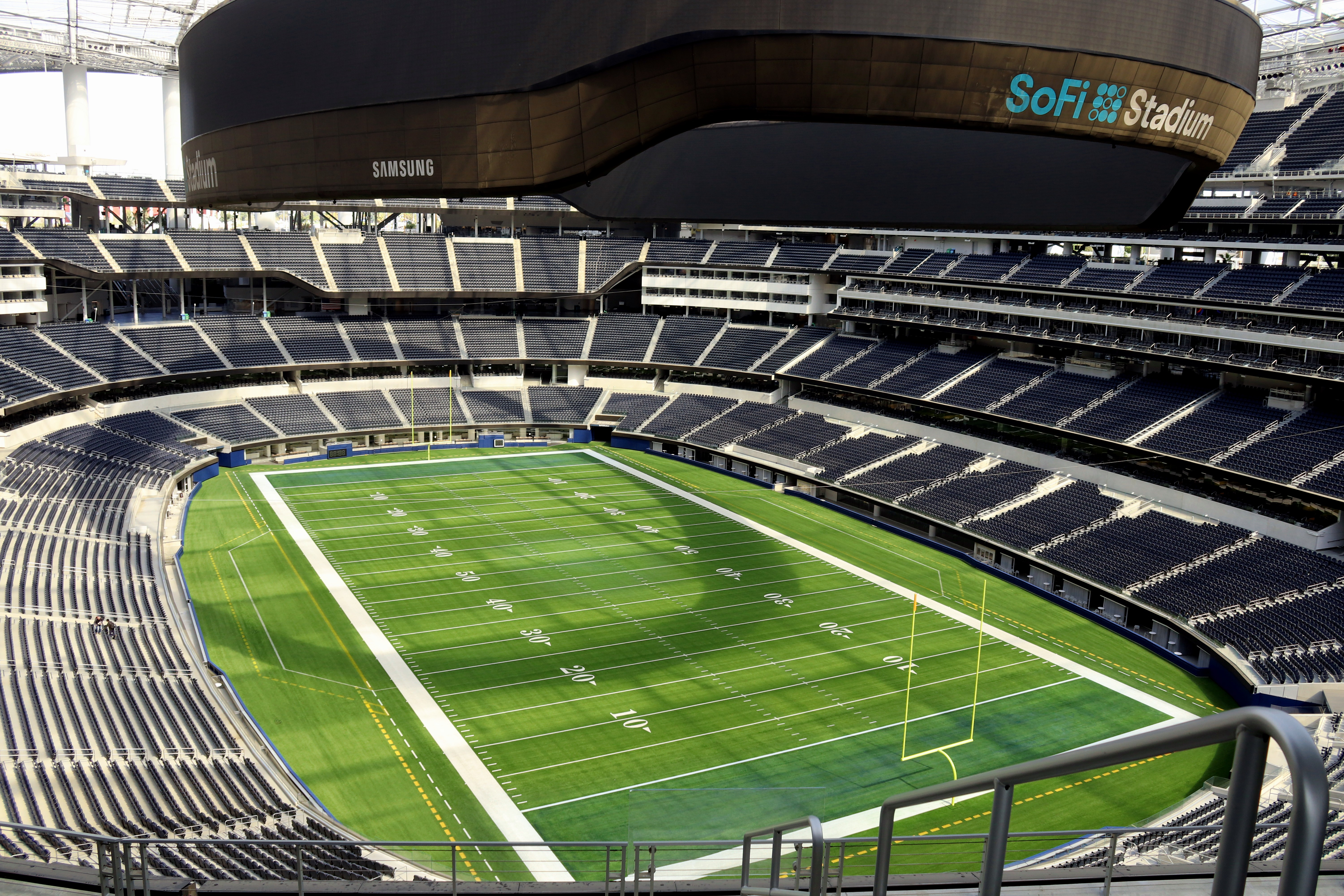
SoFi Stadium, the Rams' current stadium is located at the former site of the Hollywood Park Racetrack in Inglewood

The Rams' 2020 season also marked the long-awaited opening of the $5 billion-plus SoFi Stadium, the world's costliest stadium. The pandemic kept fans out of the stadium's 70,000 seats during its first year. The team, which had also undergone a rebranding of logos, colors and uniforms, won their first game of the 2020 season, 20–17, over the Cowboys. Near the game's end, Dallas was denied a large gain that would have put them in scoring position when a controversial offensive-pass-interference penalty was called on Dallas receiver Michael Gallup against Ramsey. The Rams won their Week 2 game with a 37–19 rout over the Philadelphia Eagles, where Jared Goff, who appeared to have shrugged off last year's struggles, completed his first 14 consecutive passes and threw for three touchdowns, all to tight end Tyler Higbee. The Rams' next played the Buffalo Bills, who led 28–3 before the Rams nearly pulled off the biggest comeback win in team history, but lost 35–32 on a controversial pass interference call against Darious Williams. In the following game, Williams snagged a game-winning interception in a low-scoring battle against the Giants, with a final score of 17–9.

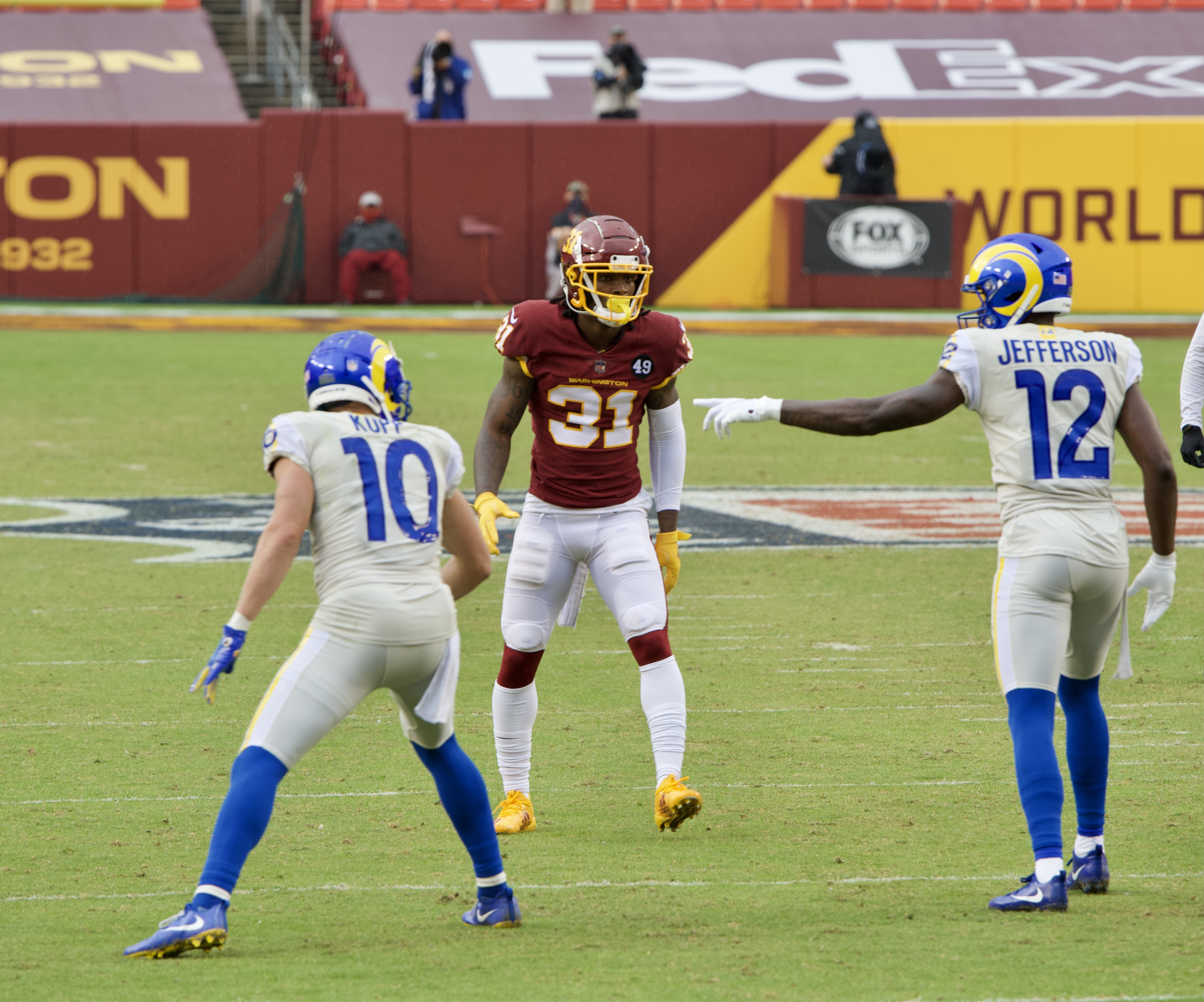
Cooper Kupp (left) and Van Jefferson (right) lining up in the slot during a game against the Washington Football Team in 2020.

After a 30–10 win over the Washington Football Team in Week 5, the Rams struggled in a 24–16 loss to a depleted San Francisco 49ers team. The defense stole the show in a bounce-back 24–10 win over the Bears in primetime, but the team then suffered an ugly 28–17 loss to the Dolphins. Los Angeles shut out Miami in the second half, but Goff struggled against Miami's defense, completing just 35 of his 61 pass attempts while throwing two interceptions and losing two fumbles. After the bye week, Darious Williams secured two interceptions in the Rams' 23–16 win over the Seahawks in Week 10. The Rams entered a crucial Monday battle against the Buccaneers, who were bolstered by the acquisition of Tom Brady in the offseason. Brady, however, struggled against the Los Angeles defense, as rookie safety Jordan Fuller picked off Brady twice, while Goff turned in a solid performance with just under 400 yards passing and three touchdowns, two of which were the first career touchdowns for Akers and Jefferson. Kicker Matt Gay also made his Rams debut. In the next game, the defense played well, but Goff's poor decisions and throws led to a 23–20 loss to the 49ers. The following week, both the offense and defense shone in a 38–28 victory over Arizona, and in a highly anticipated rematch of Super Bowl LIII, the Rams dismantled the Patriots 24–3. Week 15 brought the biggest upset of the year: the Rams gave the 0–13 New York Jets their first win of the season, 23–20. Los Angeles went down by 13 points before scoring, and crucial mistakes from Goff as well as strong performances from the Jets defense put the game out of reach. Many suggested that the Rams needed to replace the turnover-prone Goff at quarterback, and calling the otherwise stellar team "a quarterback away" from being a legitimate Super Bowl contender. Goff broke his thumb late in a 20–9 loss to Seattle, and in their season finale against the Cardinals, John Wolford made his first career start after Goff had surgery on his throwing hand. Wolford and the Los Angeles defense played well, and the Rams took down the Cardinals 18–7, while the Green Bay Packers' victory over the Chicago Bears clinched the Rams a playoff berth. The Rams finished the 2020 season with a 10–6 record.

Wolford was given the start over Goff in the Rams' Wild Card round game against the Seahawks, though early in the game, a rough hit by Seahawks safety Jamal Adams took Wolford out of the game with a neck injury. Goff, who was playing with a bandaged throwing thumb, came into the game and helped to steady the Rams' offense while the defense took over the rest of the game, and the Rams eliminated their rivals with a 30–20 win. Rams superstar defender Aaron Donald missed most of the second half with a rib injury, and the next week, with Wolford declared out due to his neck injury, Goff had to step in again in the Divisional round against a heavily favored Packers team. Goff played a more solid game, but Donald, who was apparently limited by his injury, was ineffective in the game, and the Packers' mistake-free offense was too much for the Rams to overcome. Green Bay won 32–18 to advance to the NFC Championship.

===== Super Bowl LVI champions (2021) =====
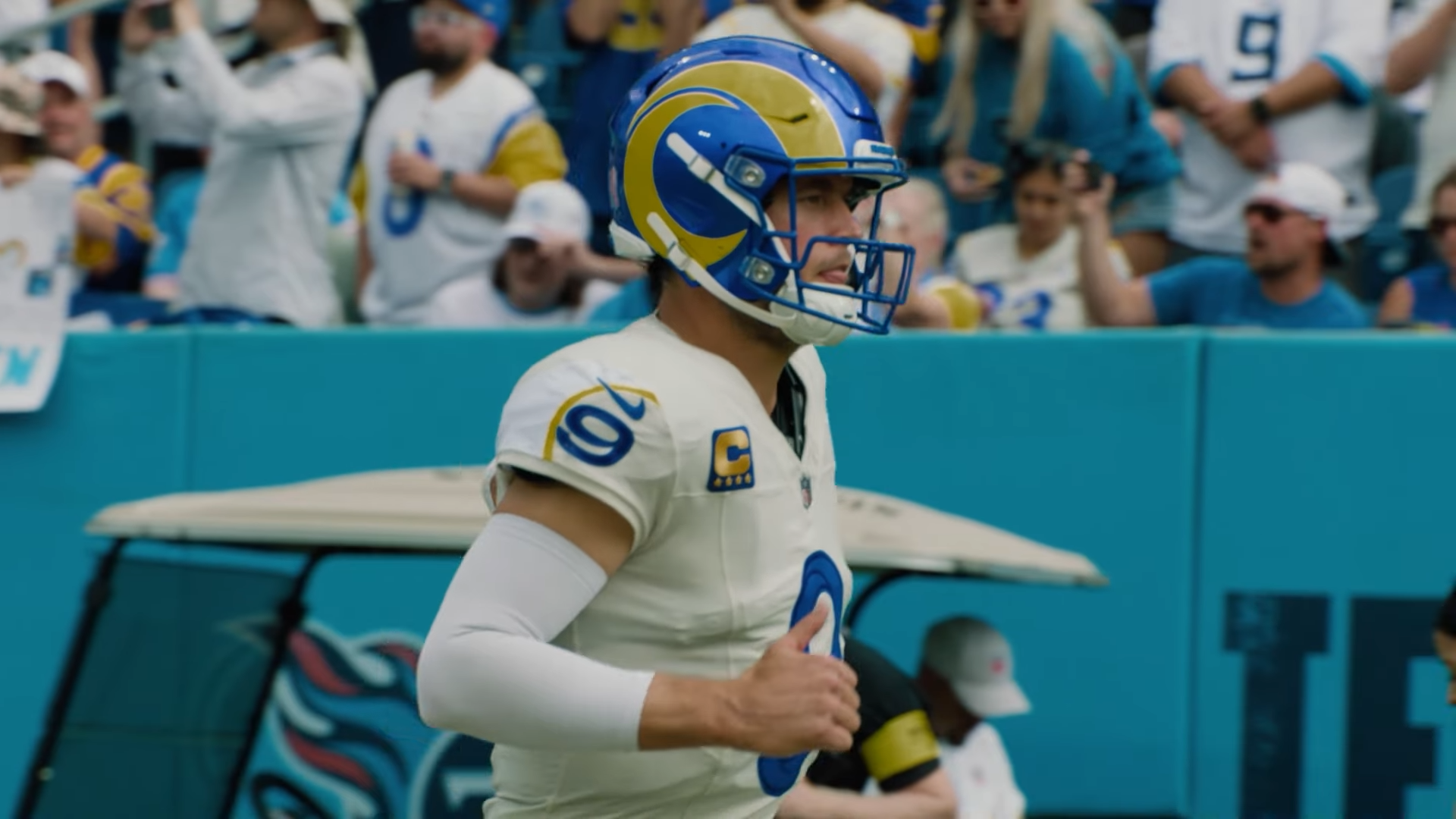
The Rams following the 2020 season traded for Lions QB Matthew Stafford.

Before Super Bowl LV was played, the Rams agreed to a blockbuster trade, dealing the inconsistent Jared Goff to the Detroit Lions in exchange for Detroit's own quarterback, Matthew Stafford. Acquiring Stafford came at a steep price, as Los Angeles gave up a 2021 third-round pick and two first-round picks in 2022 and 2023. The offseason saw more losses, as defensive coordinator Brandon Staley left to become the head coach of the crosstown rival Chargers, while the team also traded Michael Brockers to the Lions, and chose not to retain impending free agents John Johnson, Gerald Everett and Josh Reynolds. The Rams added more depth at wide receiver, signing free agent DeSean Jackson and drafting Tutu Atwell. Another addition came when the team suffered the loss of Cam Akers for the season due to an Achilles injury, and veteran Sony Michel was tapped as the replacement.

Before the season, SoFi Stadium was permitted to allow fans to attend Rams games for the first time during the pandemic. The Rams opened their 2021 season on Sunday Night Football against the Chicago Bears. In front of a sellout crowd, Matthew Stafford exploded in his Los Angeles debut, throwing for three touchdowns and 321 yards as the Rams defeated the Bears 34–14. The Rams followed it up with a close 27–24 win over the Indianapolis Colts before a strong victory against the defending Super Bowl champion Tampa Bay Buccaneers, 34–24. The Rams were handed their first loss of the season against the division rival Arizona Cardinals, ending their perfect record against the Cardinals under Sean McVay, though the team was able to bounce back in a wild 26–17 win over another division opponent, the Seattle Seahawks, before a blowout win over the New York Giants 38–11. The Rams then squared off with Stafford's former team, the Lions, while also facing their former quarterback Jared Goff, a back-and-forth matchup that resulted in the Rams prevailing 28–19.

A day after defeating the Lions, the team traded linebacker Kenny Young to the Denver Broncos, and later confirmed that DeSean Jackson would be permitted to seek a trade. Jackson would later be released into free agency after the team was unable to find a trade partner. On Halloween, the Rams offense exploded for a 38–22 win over the Houston Texans. A day after the victory, the Rams made a blockbuster move, acquiring Pro Bowl linebacker Von Miller from the Broncos in exchange for two draft picks. However, Miller was unable to make his debut the week he was traded, as he was still dealing with an ankle injury. On November 11, Los Angeles would then make another blockbuster move, signing former Cleveland Browns wide receiver Odell Beckham Jr. to a one-year deal.

However, the new acquisitions did not result in immediate dividends as the Rams lost three straight games to fall to 7–4. Turnovers plagued Los Angeles in both a 28–16 loss to the Tennessee Titans on Sunday Night Football and a 31–10 rout at the San Francisco 49ers on Monday Night Football, L.A.'s fifth straight loss to their traditional rival. Following a bye week, the Rams fell on the road at Green Bay in 36–28 loss to the Packers that dropped Los Angeles to 7–4. A 37–7 win at home versus the Jacksonville Jaguars ended the Rams' skid, which was then followed by a resounding 30–23 victory on the road against Arizona. Despite missing half a dozen starters due to COVID-19 protocols, the Rams pulled away in the second half as Matthew Stafford threw touchdown passes to Cooper Kupp, Van Jefferson and Odell Beckham Jr. to thrust L.A. back into the NFC West Division race. Though COVID-19 issues caused the Rams' home game against Seattle to be postponed for two days, Los Angeles clamped down on the Seahawks 20–10 for its third straight victory. In that game, Cooper Kupp caught nine passes for 136 yards and two TDs, and his 122 receptions through 14 games surpassed the Rams' single season receptions record held by Hall of Fame wide receiver Isaac Bruce. The Rams clinched their fourth NFC playoff berth in five seasons the following week by holding off the host Minnesota Vikings 30–23. After going winless (0–3) in November, the Rams won four straight in December, though in their final game of the regular season, blew a 17–0 lead to the 49ers in their sixth straight loss to their division rivals, a result that allowed San Francisco into the postseason. Despite this, the Seahawks' victory over the Cardinals that same week allowed the Rams to finish in 1st place in the NFC West with a 12–5 record. Also, in a surprising development, Cam Akers was able to take the field in the Rams' regular season finale, having made an unprecedented quick recovery from his torn Achilles, though he took a very limited number of snaps in the game. Akers would go on to be a full participant in the Rams' postseason.

In the playoffs, the Rams closed out the Wild Card round by defeating the divisional rival Arizona Cardinals in a 34–11 rout, taking place in the first ever Monday Night Football playoff game. One week later, against the Tampa Bay Buccaneers, the Rams jumped out to a 27–3 lead before Tom Brady and the Buccaneers stormed back into the game and tied it with under a minute remaining, though Cooper Kupp caught two deep passes from Matthew Stafford, and Matt Gay kicked a game-winning field goal that allowed the Rams to advance to the NFC Championship, where they would again face their divisional rival San Francisco 49ers. The 49ers led 17–7 late in the game, but a sideline speech from Aaron Donald to the rest of the team's defense reinvigorated Los Angeles to come back and eventually take a 20–17 lead. Shortly after, with just over one minute remaining, Donald tackled 49ers quarterback Jimmy Garoppolo mid-throw, and his desperate pass was picked off by Travin Howard, allowing the Rams to reach Super Bowl LVI, where they would face the Cincinnati Bengals.

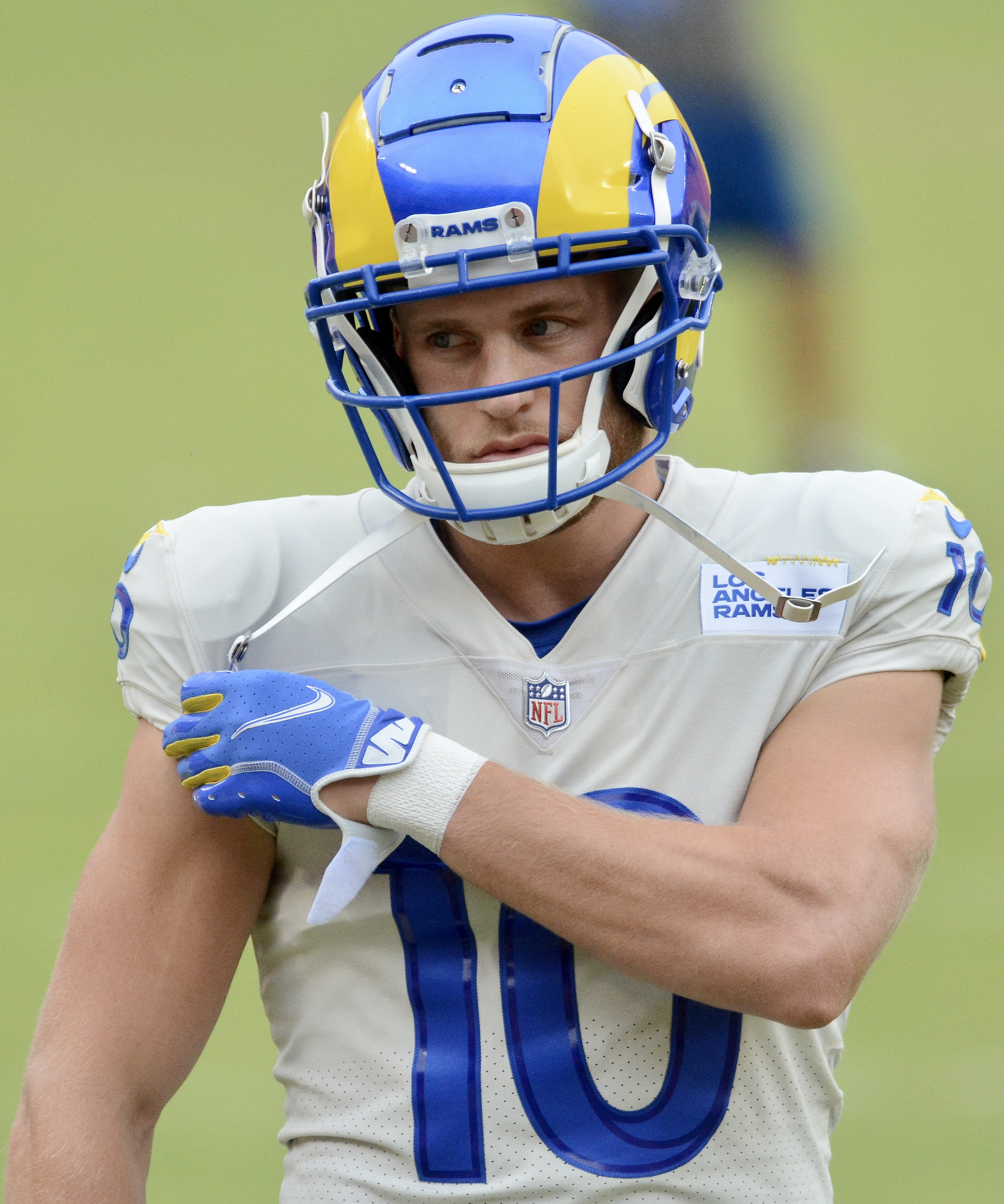
Cooper Kupp, Super Bowl MVP and receiving triple crown of 2021.

In the Super Bowl, the Rams took an early 13–3 lead on touchdowns from Kupp and Beckham, but Beckham went down with a non-contact ACL injury to end the first half, by which point Los Angeles' lead was cut to 3. The second half began with disaster, as Bengals quarterback Joe Burrow connected with Tee Higgins for a 75-yard touchdown, though replay footage showed Higgins appear to get away with grabbing Jalen Ramsey's facemask. No flag was thrown, and the Bengals eventually took a late 20–16 lead, but the Rams orchestrated a game-winning drive featuring multiple connections between Matthew Stafford and Cooper Kupp, and after a flurry of penalties near the end zone, Stafford and Kupp connected one final time for the Rams to take a 23–20 lead. On Cincinnati's final drive, the Bengals faced a 4th & 1 near mid-field, and, in a moment mirroring his game-winning tackle of Jimmy Garoppolo two weeks prior, Aaron Donald tackled Joe Burrow, and his final desperation throw fell incomplete, giving the Rams their second Super Bowl win as well as their first Super Bowl win in Los Angeles. This also marked the second year in a row that a team that played in the Super Bowl played in their home stadium (SoFi Stadium), as in Super Bowl LV, the Buccaneers won against the Chiefs in Raymond James Stadium. However, the Rams were designated as the away team, as in even-numbered years, the AFC is designated as the home team.

After becoming Super Bowl champions, there was some doubt as to whether Aaron Donald and Sean McVay would return to the team, as reports began to circulate shortly before the Super Bowl that Donald was considering retirement, and McVay had been offered a TV deal with ESPN. However, McVay would state that he had no intention of going to TV, and later during a press conference, McVay said that Donald had communicated to him that he would also return. McVay later received a contract extension, as did wide receiver Cooper Kupp, while Donald's current deal was restructured to increase his guaranteed money to $95 million through the 2024 NFL season. Meanwhile, veteran offensive lineman Andrew Whitworth announced his retirement shortly into the offseason. The Rams made a move at wide receiver near the start of free agency, signing free agent and former Jacksonville Jaguars and Chicago Bears wideout Allen Robinson to a three-year deal. Wide receiver Robert Woods, who had missed a majority of the previous season with a torn ACL, was the odd man out, as he was dealt to the Tennessee Titans for a late round pick in 2023. Shortly before the Woods trade, the Rams extended quarterback Matthew Stafford on a four-year deal. The Rams also lost Von Miller to the Buffalo Bills in free agency, though eventually filled the hole by signing free agent linebacker and former division rival Bobby Wagner to a five-year deal. Wagner after signing with Los Angeles stated that he wanted to remain on the West Coast, and that "playing the Seahawks (his former team) twice a year was the cherry on top."

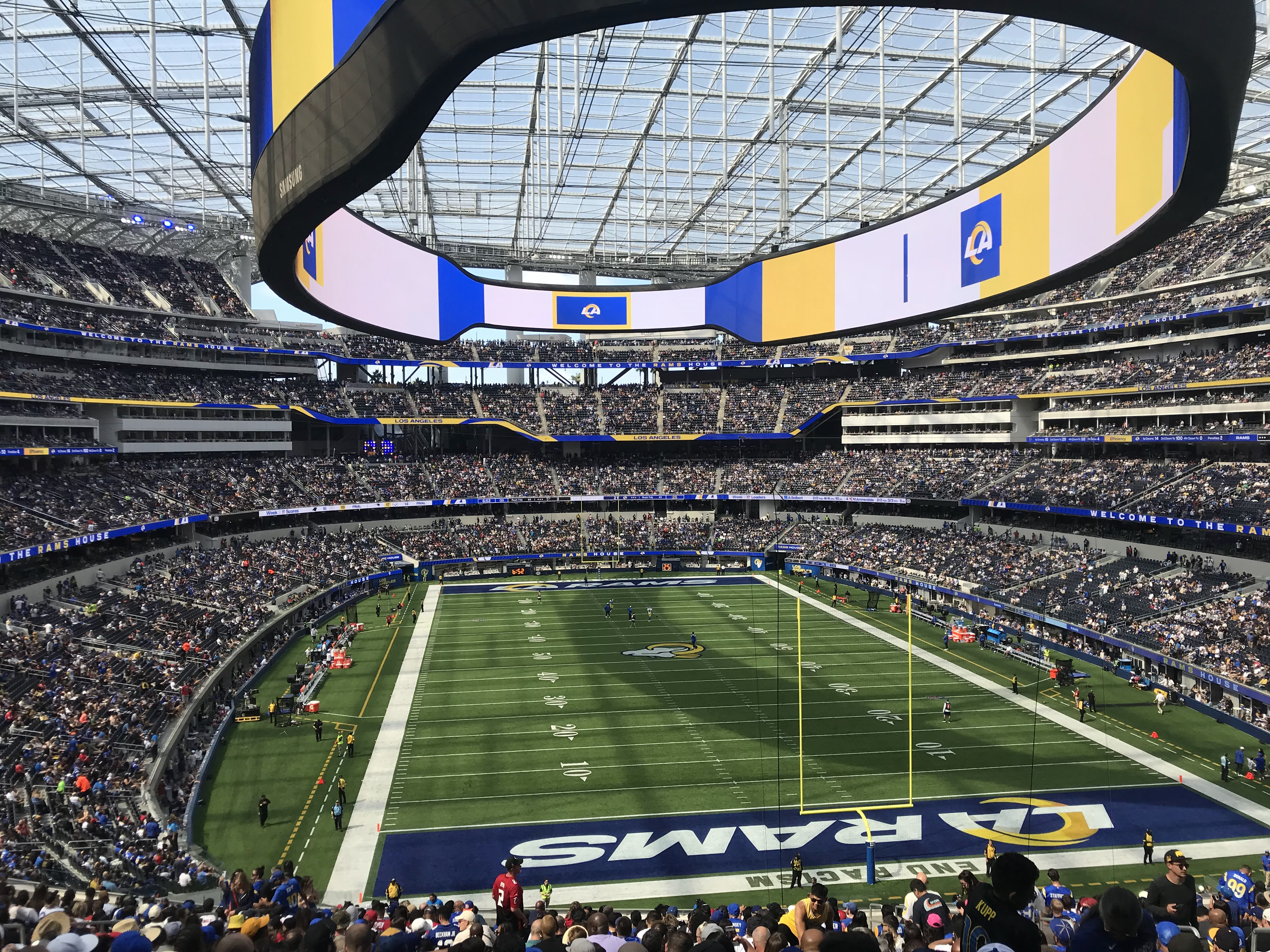
Sofi Stadium on September 18, 2022, following a Rams-Falcons game

In May 2022, Rams owner Stan Kroenke purchased a 34-acre property (14 ha) in Woodland Hills that included The Promenade shopping mall for approximately $150 million. A month later, Kroenke bought an adjacent 31-acre property (13 ha) for $175 million. The combined 65-acre property (26 ha) is expected to be developed into a permanent team headquarters and practice facility. An adjacent shopping center called The Village was purchased in January 2023 for $325-million bringing the total property ownership to 100 acres (40 ha). The center will continue to operate as an open-air lifestyle and retail destination.

===== Super Bowl hangover and retooling (2022–2023) =====
The Rams' 2022 season began on a low note; despite opening the season celebrating their Super Bowl victory at home, they were unable to capitalize on two first half turnovers by Buffalo Bills quarterback Josh Allen, falling 31–10. The next week, they jumped out to a 28–3 lead over the Atlanta Falcons, but had to stave off a furious late comeback attempt by Atlanta, though they held on to win 31–27. They defeated the Cardinals 20–12 on the road before falling flat on the road against the 49ers, 24–9 on Monday Night Football. Los Angeles would continue to struggle offensively the next week, with early miscues against the Dallas Cowboys putting them into a hole they could not recover from, and they lost 22–10. The Rams, however, would even their record after a dominant second half against the Carolina Panthers, winning 24–10.

After the bye week, the Rams would go on to only win two of their last eleven remaining games. Injuries became a major problem for the team, as core players such as Matthew Stafford, Cooper Kupp, Aaron Donald, and Allen Robinson were all lost for the year to injury, while unspecified issues appeared to begin cropping up with running back Cam Akers, who had apparently not meshed well with players and the coaching staff, and the team unsuccessfully attempted to seek out a trade partner. The team notably signed 2018 first overall pick quarterback Baker Mayfield after picking him up on waivers when he was released by the Panthers days before Los Angeles' Thursday Night Football matchup with the Raiders in Week 14. Mayfield, despite having only been on the team for two days, would then come into the game and lead the team to a last minute, 98-yard game-winning drive with no timeouts to snap the Rams' six game losing streak. The team, however, would be eliminated from playoff contention the following Monday evening after a lackluster performance against the Green Bay Packers. Los Angeles' fifth and final win of 2022 came in a blowout victory over the Denver Broncos on Christmas Day. After a controversial overtime loss to the Seahawks in Week 18, they finished with a 5–12 record, the all-time worst record by a defending Super Bowl champion.

The Rams made several significant changes in the offseason in order to deal with the salary cap: Jalen Ramsey, Allen Robinson, Bobby Wagner, Leonard Floyd and A'Shawn Robinson were notable names that were either traded or released. Head coach Sean McVay was also rumored to be considering stepping down, but later confirmed that he would return to the team. Star wide receiver Cooper Kupp suffered a hamstring injury in training camp that required him to be placed on injured reserve to begin the season, sidelining him for the first four games.

The Rams began their 2023 season with a 30–13 win over the Seahawks after a dominant second half. Matthew Stafford appeared to return to form, while attention also went to rookie receiver Puka Nacua, who was drafted in the fifth round in 2023 and was anticipated to have a large role with Kupp out. Nacua recorded 10 receptions in his debut. Meanwhile, more unspecified issues behind the scenes again arose with Cam Akers, who was made inactive before Week 2 and eventually traded to the Minnesota Vikings. Second-year running back Kyren Williams got his first real chance to take control of the Rams' ground game, and made the most of it, scoring four touchdowns in the first two games, but the Rams once again fell short of defeating the 49ers, losing their ninth consecutive game to their division rival. Nacua, meanwhile, set the rookie record for most receptions in a single game.

The Rams offense largely fell flat on Monday Night Football in Week 3, losing a Super Bowl LVI rematch to the Cincinnati Bengals, 19–16. The team's new top cornerback, Ahkello Witherspoon, recorded his first interception with Los Angeles in the loss. The next week, Los Angeles jumped out to a 23–0 lead over the Indianapolis Colts, but after Matthew Stafford suffered a rough hit in the game and was noticeably limping, the Colts stormed back into the game and tied it at 23, though Stafford would remain in the game and would throw Puka Nacua's first career touchdown to win the game in overtime. Cooper Kupp returned to action in Week 5 against the Philadelphia Eagles, and the Rams were competitive in the game but could not hold on, losing 23–14. The team rebounded the next week at home against the Cardinals; despite struggling offensively in the first half, they stepped up for a 20-point second half to win 26–9. By this point, defensive rookies Byron Young and Kobie Turner began to make massive impacts on the defensive side of the ball for the Rams, suggesting the team might compete for a playoff spot despite appearing to be in a rebuilding situation.

The next week, however, the Rams were one possession away from a potential comeback over the Pittsburgh Steelers, however, as Steelers quarterback Kenny Pickett attempted to rush the ball on fourth-and-1, he appeared to have been almost clearly stopped short of the line to gain. Unfortunately for the Rams, the officials gave Pickett the first down, denying Los Angeles their final possession and dropping them to 3–4. The Rams then made a series of miscues in a blowout loss to the Dallas Cowboys, 43–20, in which Matthew Stafford injured his thumb diving to make a catch on a two-point conversion. Stafford would miss the Rams' 20–3 loss to the Packers the following week, in which Brett Rypien started.

Despite sitting at 3–6 and outside the playoff picture, the Rams would only lose one game following their bye week in Week 10. As Stafford returned, and Carson Wentz was signed as the team's new backup quarterback, the team completed a sweep of the Seahawks, defeating them by one point, 17–16, after Seattle kicker Jason Myers missed a potential game-winning 55-yard field goal. After blowout wins over the Arizona Cardinals and Cleveland Browns, the Rams put up a tough fight against a Baltimore Ravens team that was heavily expected to contend for the Super Bowl. Baltimore needed overtime to win the game 37–31, scoring the winning touchdown off of a punt return, although appearing to get away with an illegal block in the back. Nevertheless, the Rams responded the next week with a 28–20 win over the Washington Commanders. The following Thursday, Los Angeles dominated the New Orleans Saints and held off a late comeback chance to win 30–22. The Rams would then play the New York Giants on New Year's Eve, in what was a very sloppy and inconsistent game from both sides. The Rams took a 26–19 lead before allowing Gunner Olszewski to score a kickoff return touchdown, however, the Giants failed to score the ensuing two-point conversion. Needing one more first down to win the game, the Rams went three-and-out, but Giants kicker Mason Crosby missed the winner from 54 yards.

Along with the Rams' win over the Giants, the Steelers' Week 17 victory over the Seahawks allowed the Rams to clinch a playoff berth, a feat considered impressive by many given the unfavorable salary cap situation the team recently experienced in the prior offseason. In Week 18, both the Rams and 49ers made the decisions to rest most starters, as the 49ers had already clinched the number one seed in the NFC. The 49ers jumped out to a 20–7 lead, but an impressive performance from Carson Wentz allowed Los Angeles back into the game, taking a 21–20 lead before forcing 49ers backup Sam Darnold to fumble on his final possession, and the Rams finally snapped their nine-game regular season losing streak to their NFC West rivals. In the season finale, Puka Nacua broke two all-time NFL rookie records, for most receptions and most receiving yards.

The Rams were pitted against the Detroit Lions in the NFC Wild Card, the second rematch between Matthew Stafford and Jared Goff since the trade that sent the quarterbacks to opposite teams. The back-and-forth affair saw multiple Rams players, including Stafford, take rough, late hits that did not get penalized, one such hit leading to tight end Tyler Higbee suffering a torn ACL. Trailing in the fourth quarter 24–23, the Rams had a chance to take the lead, but Nacua was hit early on Stafford's final throw, and again, no penalty was given, allowing the Lions to run out the rest of the clock and win their first playoff game in 30 years.

===== Post-Aaron Donald era (2024–2025) =====
On March 15, 2024, Rams superstar defensive tackle Aaron Donald, widely considered to be the best defensive player in football, announced his retirement. Donald played all ten seasons of his career with the Rams, tallying up 111 sacks, having never missed the Pro Bowl, and being named Defensive Player of the Year three times, tying the all-time NFL record.

The Rams opened free agency in 2024 making two notable acquisitions on defense, reuniting with cornerback Darious Williams, while signing safety Kamren Curl. Former 49ers and Raiders quarterback Jimmy Garoppolo was signed to be the team's backup on the same day Donald announced his departure. Pro Bowl cornerback Tre'Davious White was also signed to a one-year deal.

The Rams' draft in 2024 was noted by the first time the team owned a selection in the first round since their return to Los Angeles in 2016. At eighteenth overall, the Rams selected Florida State linebacker Jared Verse, who highlighted their draft class alongside his Florida State teammate Braden Fiske, who the Rams traded up to 37th overall to select.

After spending the eight previous seasons at UC Irvine, the Rams held training camp for the first time at Loyola Marymount University in Los Angeles. Following the end of training camp, the Rams conducted the remainder of its preseason practices at Cal Lutheran University in Thousand Oaks, where the team had operated its temporary training facility since 2016 when the franchise moved from St. Louis. This was necessitated due to delays in the construction of the Kroenke Warner Center complex in Woodland Hills. Following the end of the preseason, the Rams began conducting practices at their new permanent facility.

The Rams' 2024 season began with an overtime loss in a rematch with the Detroit Lions; the Rams erased a 17–3 deficit to take a 20–17 lead, but Detroit tied the game on a field goal and Los Angeles never saw the football again after losing the overtime coin toss. Multiple Rams starters in this game suffered injury, including Puka Nacua, who reaggravated a knee injury suffered during training camp, and Cooper Kupp, who reaggravated his previous hamstring injury that saw him miss multiple games in 2023. Kupp would play in the Rams' Week 2 contest in Arizona, but took minimal snaps as the injury worsened, and the Rams were blown out by the Cardinals 41–10. With multiple offensive linemen and their top two receivers missing as a result of the flurry of injuries in the first two games, the Rams began their season with a 1–4 record, their only win coming from an impressive comeback over the San Francisco 49ers, 27–24. Tre'Davious White notably struggled, as he was still recovering from a torn Achilles from the prior season, and the Rams would replace White by reuniting with Ahkello Witherspoon in free agency while White was eventually traded to the Baltimore Ravens.

The Rams broke their losing streak with a 20–15 win over the Las Vegas Raiders, and both Kupp and Nacua were able to return in time for the team's following Thursday game against the Minnesota Vikings. Both players significantly contributed to the offense as the Rams defeated the Vikings 30–20, and as multiple injured starters began to recover and return to action, Los Angeles continued their hot streak with a 26–20 win in overtime over the Seattle Seahawks, where Demarcus Robinson caught the game-winning touchdown.

The Rams' offense was halted in a Monday loss to the Miami Dolphins; despite reaching the red zone five times, the Rams never scored a touchdown in the 23–15 loss. The team responded with a 28–22 win over the New England Patriots, but the following week were overwhelmed by a strong performance from the Philadelphia Eagles, where Eagles running back Saquon Barkley put up 255 rushing yards in a 37–20 win for Philadelphia. Against the New Orleans Saints, Los Angeles was shut out in the first half for just the second time in the Sean McVay era, but nevertheless managed to come back and win the game 21–14. The Rams then outlasted the Buffalo Bills in an offensive explosion; despite Bills quarterback Josh Allen scoring six total touchdowns, the Rams offense kept pace as Matthew Stafford threw for 320 yards, and Puka Nacua had multiple touchdowns as the Rams won 44–42.

The following Thursday, the Rams defeated the 49ers in a sloppy game from both sides; rainy weather and soggy field conditions for a large portion of the game contributed to slowing both offenses down as neither team scored a touchdown. This 12-6 win marked the first time the Rams had swept their upstate rivals since 2018, and the loss effectively eliminated San Francisco from playoff contention (they were officially eliminated the next week). The Rams defeated the Jets 19–9 in frigid conditions, before another difficult, low-scoring game against the Cardinals on Saturday of Week 17. However, despite the struggles of the offense, Ahkello Witherspoon shut down the Cardinals' final drive with a diving interception to secure a 13–9 win. A series of results on the following Sunday allowed the Rams to clinch the NFC West division title on a strength of victory tiebreaker, while eliminating the Seahawks, who defeated the Rams 30–25 in the regular season finale as Los Angeles rested multiple starters to prepare for the playoffs.

The Rams were scheduled to play their Wild Card game, a rematch with the Vikings, at SoFi Stadium on Monday, January 13, 2025. However, days before the game, a massive series of wildfires broke out in the Los Angeles region, forcing the game to be moved to State Farm Stadium in Arizona. The Cardinals organization graciously allowed the Rams full use of their facilities, including allowing the players' use of their practice facility, painting the field at State Farm Stadium to resemble the Rams' field at SoFi Stadium, and temporarily converting multiple shops in the stadium into Rams team stores. Additionally, the Rams organized several charter buses to carry several Rams fans, including season ticket holders, to and from the game in Arizona. In the game itself, the Rams dominated the Vikings in a 27–9 win; the defense recorded nine sacks on Vikings quarterback Sam Darnold, tying a single-game NFL playoff record. The following week, the Rams traveled to Philadelphia in a rematch with the Eagles in the Divisional round; the back-and-forth contest ultimately saw the Rams earn a final, game-winning drive opportunity that was stopped 14 yards shy of the end zone. The Eagles won the game 28–22 and would go on to win Super Bowl LIX.

On February 6, 2025, the NFL and the Victoria State Government announced that the Rams would be the designated home team for the 2026 NFL Melbourne Game at the Melbourne Cricket Ground, which will be the first regular season NFL game played in Australia. With a spectator capacity of 100,024, the MCG is the largest stadium in the Southern Hemisphere and the 11th largest in the world. Also prior to the season, the Rams released veteran wide receiver Cooper Kupp after eight seasons with the team.

In 2025, the Rams improved on their record, going 12-5 during the regular season and reaching the playoffs for the third straight season. L.A. started off with two straight wins over Houston (14-9) at home and at Tennessee (33-19) and appeared well on their way to victory at Philadelphia, holding a 19-point advantage in the third quarter. But defensive breakdowns and special teams mistakes helped the host Eagles rally to win 33-26. The Rams rallied the next week to overcome Indianapolis 27-20 but again were plagued by critical mistakes in losing to visiting San Francisco 26-23 in overtime on Thursday Night Football.

Stung by the loss, Los Angeles won six games over the next seven weeks, routing Baltimore 17-3 and Jacksonville 35-7 in the Rams' first game in London since 2019 (this time as the 'visiting' team). Following a bye week, L.A. returned home to blow out New Orleans 34-10, then avenged their earlier loss to San Francisco with a convincing 42-26 road victory. Playing their next two games at SoFi Stadium, the Rams edged out NFC West rival Seattle 21-19 before throttling Tampa Bay 34-7 on Sunday Night Football to improve their record to 9-2.

Critical turnovers and defensive miscues proved costly for the Rams in a 31-28 loss at Carolina, but L.A. recovered by dominating host Arizona 45-17 and with a solid 41-34 win at home against Detroit appeared ready to secure their second straight NFC West title with a Thursday Night special at Seattle. The Rams totaled nearly 600 yards and scored seven times against the vaunted Seahawks defense and led 30-14 with under 10 minutes remaining in regulation. However, Seattle capitalized on more errors by L.A.'s defense and special teams and benefited from a controversial two-point conversion play to score 16 unanswered points, forcing overtime. The Rams received the ball to begin the extra period and quickly scored a go-ahead touchdown, but with the league's new rule guaranteeing both teams a possession in overtime, the Seahawks answered with a touchdown of their own along with their third successful two-point conversion to secure a crucial 38-37 victory. That, along with a 27-24 loss at Atlanta on Monday Night Football in Week 17 gave Seattle the NFC West title and homefield advantage through the playoffs.

After finishing off Arizona at home 37-20, the Rams at 12-5 were the NFC's top wild card entry and traveled back to Carolina to face the 8-9 Panthers. In a back-and-forth battle, the Rams prevailed 34-31 to knock off the NFC South champions, then traveled to Chicago for the divisional round. Prevailing in overtime 20-17, Los Angeles advanced to the NFC Championship Game for the third time under McVay. On January 25, 2026, the Rams lost to host Seattle in the conference championship 31-27, and the Seahawks went on to defeat the New England Patriots to claim the Vince Lombardi Trophy. It was the second straight season that the Rams narrowly lost on the road in the playoffs to the eventual Super Bowl champion.

Quarterback Matthew Stafford led the NFL in passing yards (4,707) and touchdowns (46) and was named league MVP, the first Rams player to do so since Kurt Warner in 2001, and he along with wide receiver Puka Nacua (129 receptions, 1,715 yards, 10 TDs) were both named first team All-Pro.

===== Blockbuster defensive acquisitions, Aaron Donald returns (2026-present) =====
In the offseason, the Rams made several blockbuster trades, acquiring All-Pro cornerback Trent McDuffie from Kansas City in March (for first, fifth, and sixth round selections in 2026 and a third round pick in 2027) and then reigning NFL Defensive Player of the Year Myles Garrett in a blockbuster deal that included multiple draft picks (first round in 2027, second round in 2028, third round in 2029) and two-time Pro Bowler Jared Verse.

As the offseason continued, rumors began heavily circulating that the Rams' acquisition of Garrett could entice former franchise legend Aaron Donald to come out of retirement. It was later reported by multiple outlets, including the Pat McAfee Show, that Donald had stated he could return, but only if he found the motivation to do so. On July 10, 2026, TMZ posted footage of Donald working out at the Rams' practice facility. Twice during the offseason, Donald was listed as having officially worked out for the Rams, but team officials maintained that he would not be pressured into making a decision. Finally, on August 30, Donald's return was officially confirmed by the team.

== Team value ==
Forbes magazine estimated the worth of the team in 2015 as $1.45 billion, which at the time were the 28th most valuable NFL team and 44th most valuable sports team in the world. However, after returning to Los Angeles from St. Louis, it was estimated by CBS Sports that the team value rose to $2.9 billion (doubling in value) placing them third in the NFL (only behind the Dallas Cowboys and the New England Patriots). In 2026, Forbes released their annual NFL team values list; ranking the Rams second at $13.5 billion, behind only the Dallas Cowboys. The franchise is one of the fastest growing sports teams in the world as the team's resurgent success in Los Angeles helped regrow a steady influx of new fans, and achieved unprecedented year-by-year rankings as previously mentioned.

Year	Value	Change	NFL	LA	US	World
2017	$3.0B	▲3%	#6	#2	#9	#12
2018	$3.2B	▲7%	#4	#2	#10	#14
2019	$3.8B	▲19%	#4	#3	#9	#12
2020	$4.0B	▲5%	#4	#2	#8	#11
2021	$4.8B	▲20%	#4	#2	#8	#13
2022	$6.2B	▲35%	#3	#1	#3	#3
2023	$6.9B	▲11%	#3	#1	#5	#5
2024	$7.6B	▲10%	#3	#1	#4	#4
2025	$10.5B	▲38%	#2	#2	#4	#4
2026	$13.5B	▲29%	Not released yet			

== Culture ==
=== Mascot ===
==== Rampage ====
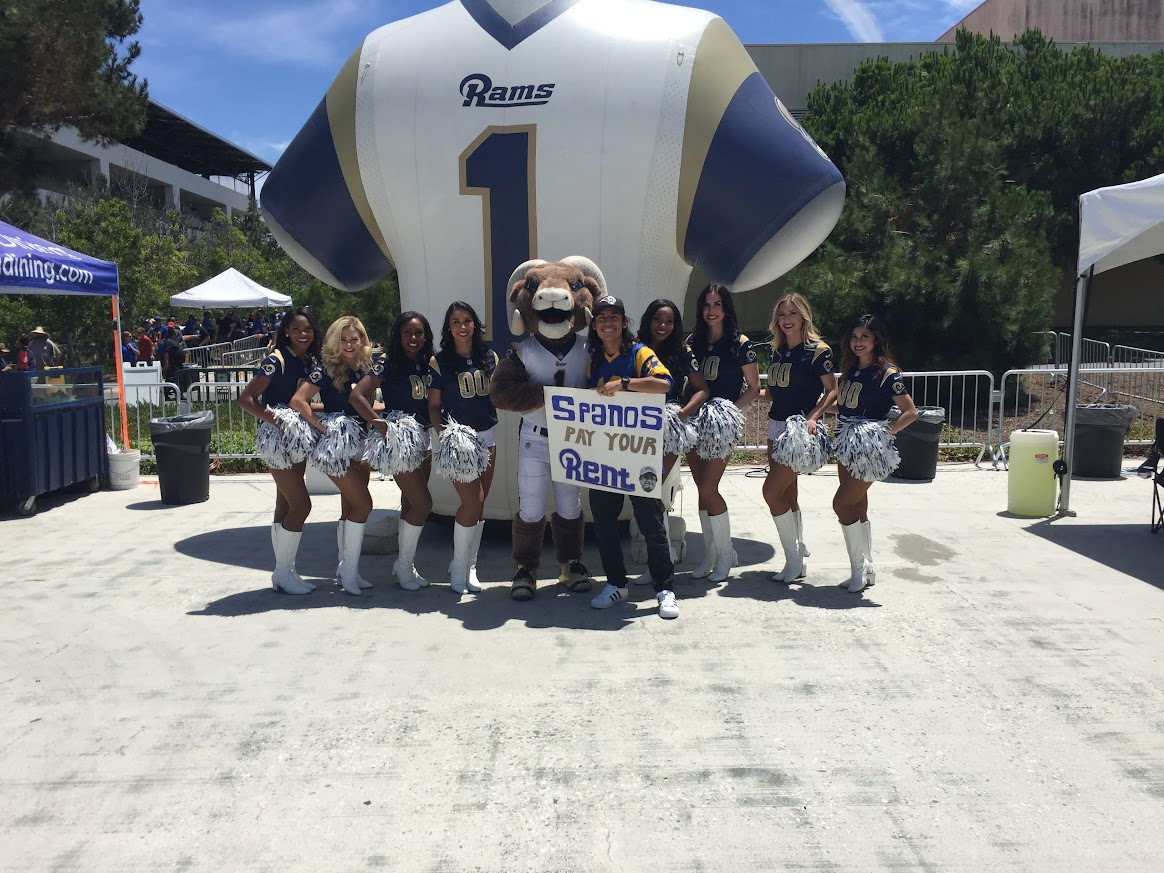
Rampage poses with a Rams fan during training camp in Irvine, California on August 3, 2019

Rampage has been the team's official mascot since 2010, being voted by fans whilst the team was still located in St. Louis.

=== Fans ===
==== Melonheads ====
During the 1980s, fan Lance Goldberg popularized the idea of wearing a watermelon on his head with horns attached to express support for the team, like the Cheesehead headgear of Green Bay Packer fans. Goldberg was inducted into the Pro Football Hall of Fame in 2000 as part of the Hall of Fans.

==== MobSquad ====
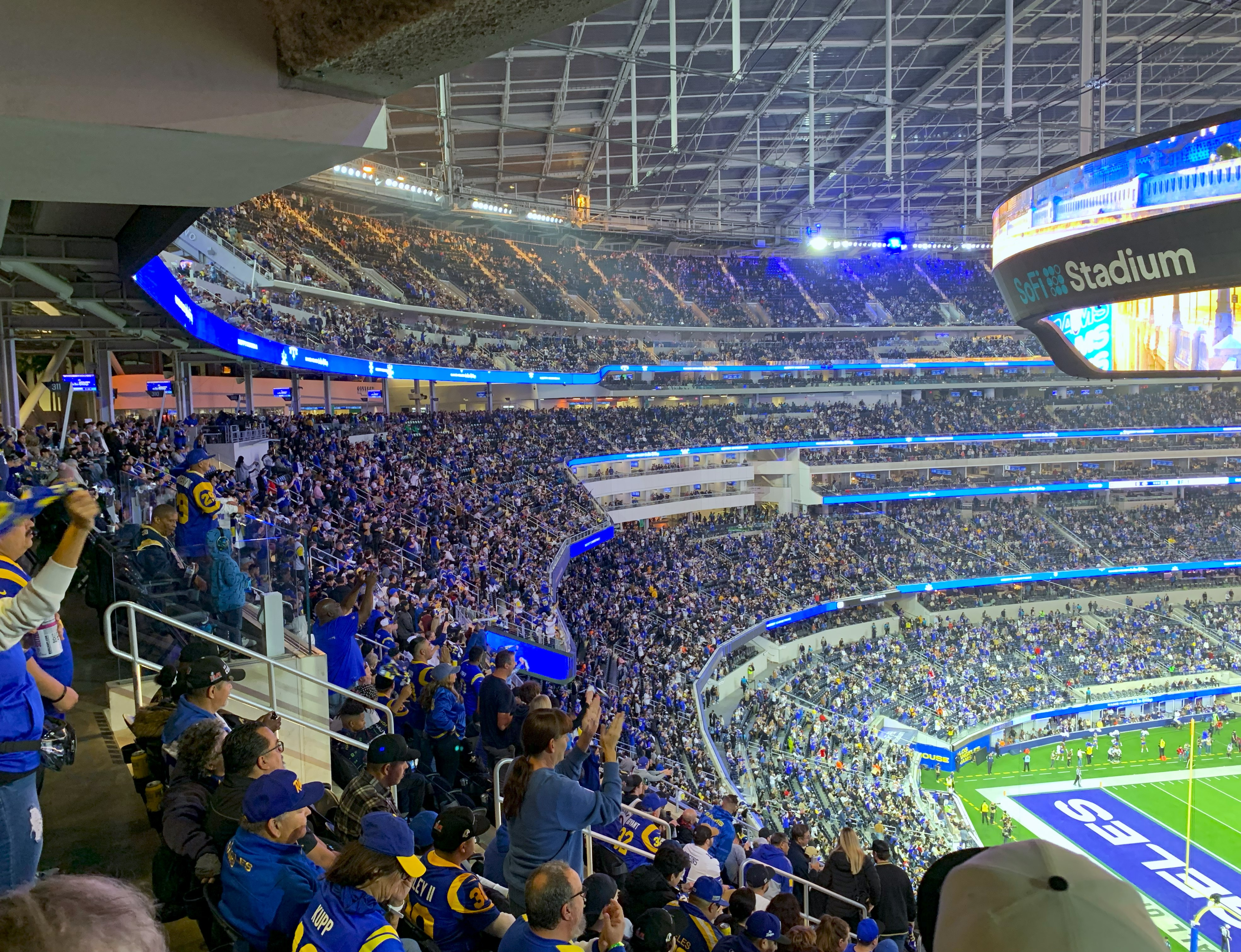
Rams fans attend a 2023 home game at SoFi Stadium

During the Rams' final season in St. Louis in 2015, the team adopted the moniker as "The Mob Squad" to tout the strength of their defense. (Also, as a group of sheep are formally called a "mob".) The team discarded the moniker after 2018, though numerous local booster clubs retain the name to this day, and has been used to refer to the entire fanbase.

=== Celebrity fans ===
Many Los Angeles-based film and music celebrities have shown support for the Rams before their 1994 departure and since their 2016 return. One notable fan is actor Terry Crews, who was drafted by the Rams in 1991 during his brief NFL career. Rage Against the Machine guitarist Tom Morello named his son after former Rams' quarterback Roman Gabriel.

==== YG ====
The rapper YG has been a staunch supporter of the time ever since their arrival back to Los Angeles in 2016. He has appeared at many games including Super Bowl LVI.

==== Terry Crews ====
Actor Terry Crews was drafted by the Rams in the 1991 NFL draft and played for one season.

==== Brenda Song ====
Actress Brenda Song has been involved in the team's media department including the teams schedule release in 2025.

==== Nita Strauss ====
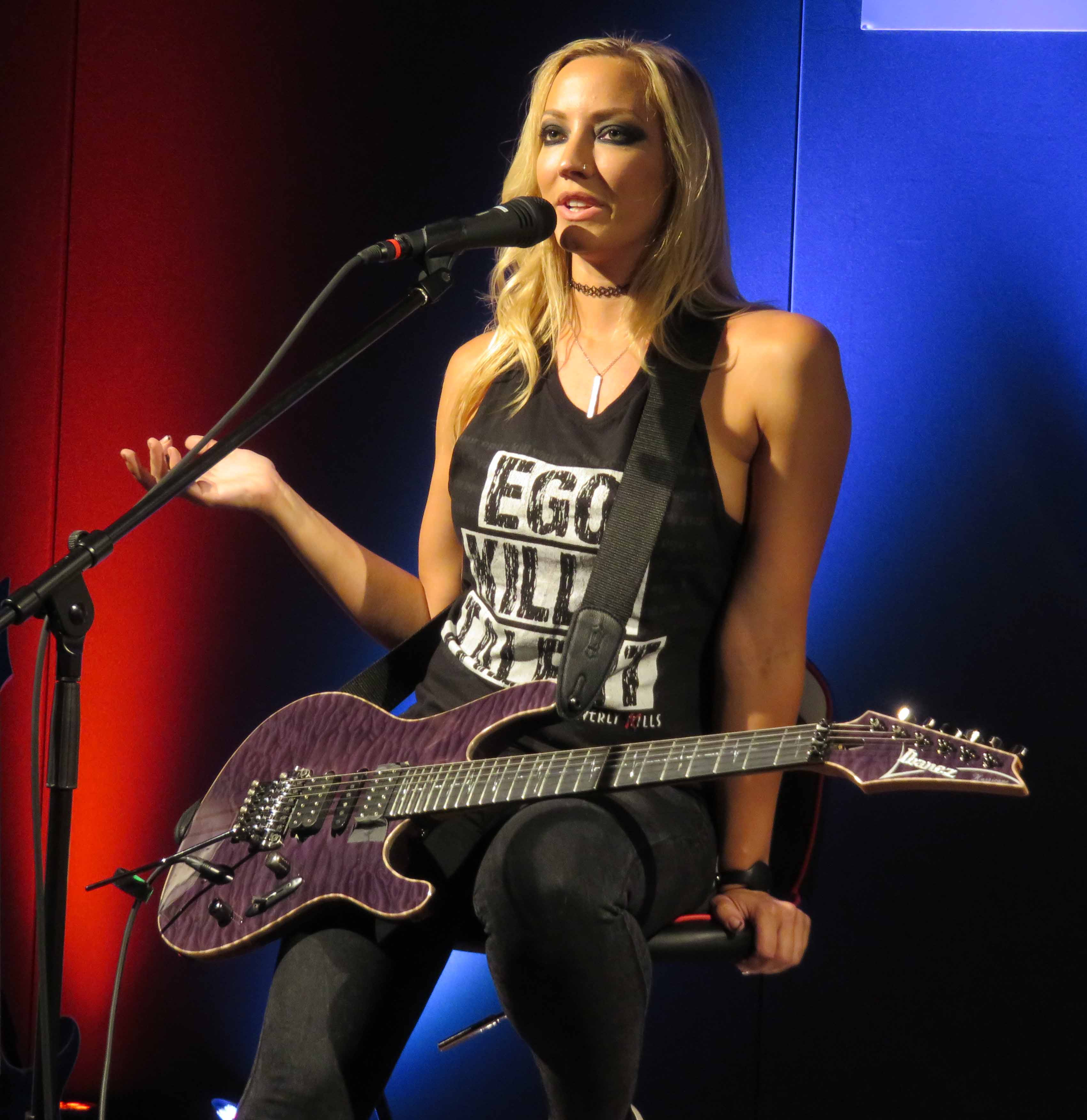
Nita Strauss is often seen starting crowd chants or performing guitar riffs during Rams' primetime home games

Another notable fan is Alice Cooper guitarist Nita Strauss, who joined the Rams' media team and entertainment personnel in 2018. Strauss often performs riffs or interludes at primetime Rams' home games to start crowd chants during breaks. Following the Rams' victory in Super Bowl LVI, the organization awarded Strauss a Super Bowl ring.

==== Nelly ====
During the team's tenure in St. Louis, the success of The Greatest Show on Turf attracted numerous high-profile fans such as local rapper Nelly. He wore team gear in the videos for his songs "Country Grammar" and "E.I.". In 2002, Nelly invited Rams players such as Torry Holt, Marshall Faulk and D'Marco Farr to appear in the music video for the song "Air Force Ones". Nelly expressed anger at the team's return to Los Angeles in 2016 but continued to display his support for the team.

==== Red Hot Chili Peppers ====
Upon the Rams' return to Los Angeles in 2016, fans were treated to an impromptu pregame concert from hometown icons Red Hot Chili Peppers for the team's first regular-season game in Los Angeles since 1994. In the band's 1987 music video for their single Fight Like a Brave, former guitarist Hillel Slovak can be seen wearing a Rams hat. Bassist Flea supports the Rams, Los Angeles Dodgers, and Los Angeles Lakers. Flea and Drummer Chad Smith have owned season tickets since the team's return in 2016, and the two can be occasionally spotted at Rams home games. In honor of the team's victory in Super Bowl LVI, the band unveiled a limited edition vinyl of their thirteenth studio album Return of the Dream Canteen on October 14, 2022, in the team's colors with a Rams sticker in the sleeve. During Rams home games, Nita Strauss often performs the riff to the song "Can't Stop" before the team enters the field from the tunnel. Strauss and former Rams' DJ Mal-ski regularly performed "Give It Away" before the fourth quarter.

== Rivalries ==
=== Divisional ===
==== San Francisco 49ers ====
Like the Dodgers-Giants rivalry of the MLB, the Rams' rivalry with the San Francisco 49ers dates back to the 1950s when both teams, original members of the NFC West, were fighting for dominance in California. In the 1970s, the clubs would regularly fight for control of the division. The 1980s yielded more notable matchups between the two teams, predominantly won by the 49ers. The two teams have met in the postseason three times, including in the 1989 NFC Championship. After the Rams moved to St. Louis in 1995, the rivalry lost its geographic spur but still saw heated games. The rivalry renewed upon the Rams return to Los Angeles in 2016, with fans, coaches, and players exhibiting animosity. Sports Illustrated considers their rivalry the 8th-best in the NFL. The 49ers and Rams are the only two teams who have been members of the NFC West since the division was formed in 1970. Both teams have hired two former Washington Redskins offensive staff as head coaches. Sean McVay and Kyle Shanahan have been credited with turning their respective teams around and making returns to the postseason; McVay returned the Rams to the Super Bowl in 2018, while Shanahan made an appearance the following season. By the 2021–22 season, Shanahan's 49ers had defeated the Rams in six consecutive regular-season games, but McVay's Rams defeated San Francisco in a crushing last-minute victory in the NFC Championship Game. The Rams later advanced to win Super Bowl LVI.

==== Seattle Seahawks ====
The Rams' rivalry with the Seattle Seahawks began after the Seahawks switched to the NFC West in 2002. The first notable matchup between the two clubs occurred in the 2004 NFC Wild card round when the Rams defeated the Seahawks in Seattle, 27–20. Much of the intensity waned as the Rams declined throughout the 2000s and early 2010s. The intensity of the rivalry found new life during the 2010s as Seattle's Legion Of Boom-era teams often clashed with the Rams' Mob Squad-era teams in a bitter fight for control of the division. Some divisional meetings saw random acts of violence on both sides. The teams have two Super Bowl wins and seven division titles since 2010. Tensions ran high during the 2021 Wild Card game following a widely publicized taunt by Seahawks safety Jamal Adams during a postgame conference after a tough win over the Rams during Week 16. The Rams beat the Seahawks in the Wild Card Game, with cornerback Jalen Ramsey and quarterback Jared Goff expressing their satisfaction.

Currently, the series is tied 28–28, but the Rams have won two out of the three playoff meetings between the two.

==== Arizona Cardinals ====
One of the oldest matchups for the Rams as both teams first met during the 1937 NFL season whilst the Rams played in Cleveland, and the Cardinals were still originally located in Chicago. The rivalry has resurged in recent years as both former-St. Louis teams found playoff success, despite the Cardinals' best efforts; the Rams have been 9–1 since hiring head coach Sean McVay in 2017. The Week 17 matchup of the 2020 season saw both teams playing for a playoff berth; despite the injury to quarterback Jared Goff the Rams managed to pull off a victory over the cardinals in a 7–18 loss that would eliminate them from the postseason. The Cardinals' streak would end against the Rams the following season, they would also manage to steal the lead of the NFC from the Rams and start the season 7–0. The following matchup would see the Rams pull off a win on Monday Night Football, the Cardinals would also struggle by losing 6 of 10 games since their 7–0 start. The Cardinals would clinch a wild card berth after a week 17 win over the Dallas Cowboys, ironically they would play the Rams in Los Angeles and lose in a 34–11 blowout loss that would see Kyler Murray throw 2 interceptions with one returning for a pick 6. Arizona fans also attribute their hatred of Los Angeles-based sports teams similarly to the Diamondbacks-Dodgers rivalry. The Rams own the series 47–39–2 in addition to 2 postseason wins in 1975 and 2022 respectively.

=== Conference ===
==== Dallas Cowboys ====
The rivalry between the Dallas Cowboys and the Los Angeles Rams became prominent during the 1970s and 1980s. The Cowboys met the Rams eight times during that span and split those meetings. Two of those matchups decided the NFC's representative in the Super Bowl, with the Cowboys prevailing on both occasions. As of the 2023 season, the Cowboys lead the all-time series 20–18, which includes the Rams leading 5–4 in the playoffs.

==== New Orleans Saints ====
The Rams and New Orleans Saints once shared a fierce divisional rivalry as the Saints played in the NFC West until the league's realignment in 2002. Animosity resurged between the two teams during the 2010s after the Rams had lured Saints' controversial defensive coordinator Gregg Williams in 2012, shortly before Williams and Saints' head coach Sean Payton would be implicated in the infamous Bountygate Scandal. Both teams had thrown insults towards one another in the media, most notably during the controversial 2018 NFC Championship Game, in which a critical pass to Saints' receiver Tommylee Lewis was illegally broken up by Rams' cornerback Nickell Robey-Coleman, though no flag was thrown, enraging the Saints for the blown call. Saints' receiver Michael Thomas expressed his anger towards the Rams and in regards to the no-call to the media following the game. The teams are tied 1–1 in the postseason, but the Rams lead the all-time series 45–34.

==== Detroit Lions ====
The Rams have played the Detroit Lions more than any other non-divisional team with 90 total matchups over the years dating back to 1937. In the 2023–24 playoffs, the Rams and Lions met for their first postseason matchup since 1952, which the Lions won 24–23 in Matthew Stafford's first game back in Detroit since being traded to the Rams. As of the 2025 season, the Rams lead the all-time series 46–43–1.

=== Interconference ===
==== Los Angeles Raiders/Los Angeles Chargers ====
Initially considered the "Battle of Los Angeles" during the Raiders' tenure in Los Angeles from 1982 to 1994, the rivalry was nonexistent as the Rams had also moved to St. Louis the same year. The Raiders unsuccessfully attempted to move back to Los Angeles in 2015 after a failed joint stadium project with the then-San Diego Chargers. The intercity series was revived only with the Los Angeles Chargers being the city's AFC team following the Rams' return to Los Angeles in 2016, and their move from San Diego in 2017. Hostility erupted between the two clubs during a 2017 joint scrimmage at the Rams' training camp in Irvine, California. Rams cornerback Nickell Robey-Coleman and Chargers receiver Keenan Allen initiated an altercation and multiple players rushed into the skirmish, creating an uproar from the crowd. Following the hiring of coach Sean McVay in 2017, the Rams managed to win back-to-back division titles, including an appearance in Super Bowl LIII during McVay's second season as head coach. The Chargers experienced their own playoff success by boasting a 12–4 record in 2018 and making an appearance in the 2018 AFC divisional round but also losing to the New England Patriots. The two teams are tied 1–1 in regular season matchups in Los Angeles thus far.

=== Historic ===
==== Minnesota Vikings ====
The Rams' rivalry with the Minnesota Vikings was most heated in the 1970s when the two teams faced off in many consequential playoff games. To-date, the Vikings are the Rams' second most played playoff opponent with eight games, and the Rams are the most played playoff opponent for the Vikings. The Vikings lead the all-time series 27–19–1 and are 5–3 in the playoffs.

==== Kansas City Chiefs ====
While the Rams were in St. Louis, the team had an intrastate rivalry with the Kansas City Chiefs, with a trophy being awarded to the winner of each matchup. The series ended after the Rams moved back to Los Angeles in 2016, though the teams' game during the 2018 season was the third-highest scoring game of all time, hailed by many as one of the greatest in league history. As of the 2023 season, the Chiefs lead the all-time series 8–5.

== Logos and uniforms ==
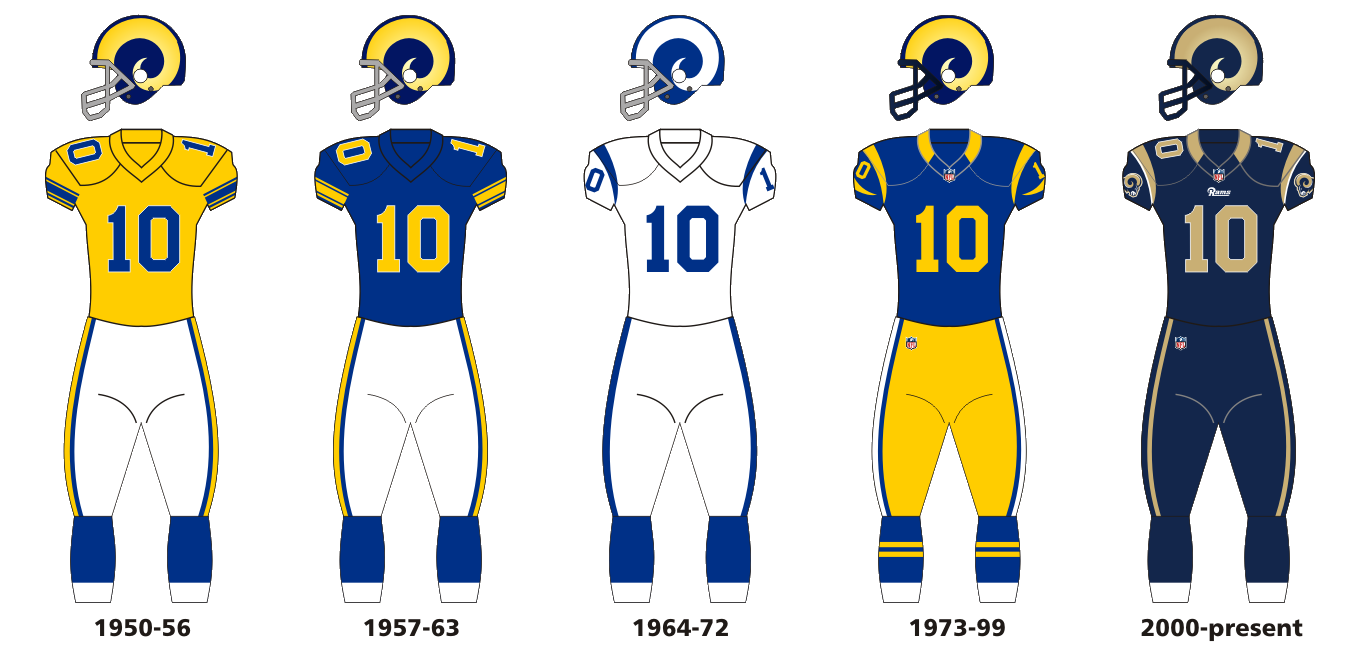
Rams' uniform evolution (1950–2016)

The Rams were the first NFL team to have a logo on their helmets. Ever since halfback Fred Gehrke, who worked as a commercial artist in off-seasons, painted ram horns on the team's leather helmets in 1948, the logo has been the club's trademark.

When the team debuted in 1937, the Rams' colors were red and black, featuring red helmets, black uniforms with red shoulders and sleeves, tan pants, and red socks with black and white stripes. One year later they switched their team colors to gold and royal blue, with gold helmets, white pants, royal blue uniforms with gold numbers and gold shoulders, white pants with a royal stripe, and solid royal blue socks. By the mid-1940s the Rams had adopted gold jerseys (with navy blue serif numerals, navy blue shoulders, gold helmets, white pants with a gold-navy-gold stripe, and gold socks with two navy stripes). The uniforms were unchanged as the team moved to Los Angeles.

The helmets were changed to navy in 1947. When Gehrke introduced the horns, they were painted yellow-gold on navy blue helmets. In 1949 the team adopted plastic helmets, and the Rams' horns were rendered by the Riddell company of Des Plaines, Illinois, which baked a painted design into the helmet at its factory. Also in 1949 the serif jersey numerals gave way to more standard block numbers. Wider, bolder horns joined at the helmet center front and curving around the earhole appeared in 1950; this design was somewhat tapered in 1954–1955. Also in 1950 a blue-gold-blue tri-stripe appeared on the pants and "Northwestern University-style" royal blue stripes were added to jersey sleeves. A white border was added to the blue jersey numerals in 1953. So-called TV numbers were added on jersey sleeves in 1956.

In accordance with a 1957 NFL rule dictating that the home team wear dark, primary-colored jerseys and the road team light shirts, the Rams hurriedly readied for the regular season new royal-blue home jerseys with golden striping and golden front and back numerals with a white border. The white border was removed in 1958. The Rams continued to wear their golden jerseys for 1957 road games, but the following year adopted a white jersey with blue numerals and stripes. In 1962–1963 the team's road white jersey featured a UCLA-style blue-gold-blue crescent shoulder tri-stripe.

Rams helmet, 1973–1999, 2018–2019

In 1964, concurrent with a major remodeling of the team's Los Angeles Memorial Coliseum home, the colors were changed to a simpler blue and white. The new helmet horns were white, wider, and separated at the helmet center front. The blue jersey had white numerals with two white sleeve stripes. The white jersey featured blue numerals and a wide blue crescent shoulder stripe. A 1964 league rule allowed teams to wear white jerseys for home games and the Rams were among several teams to do so (the Dallas Cowboys, who introduced their blue-white-silverblue uniform that season, have worn white at home ever since), as owner Dan Reeves felt it would be more enjoyable for fans to see the various colors of the rest of the league as opposed to always having the Rams in blue and the visiting team in white. The pants were white with a thick blue stripe. In 1970, in keeping with the standards of the newly merged NFL, names appeared on the jersey backs for the first time. The sleeve "TV numbers", quite large compared to those of other teams, were made smaller in 1965. From 1964 to early 1972 the Rams wore white jerseys for every home league game and exhibition, at one point not wearing their blue jerseys at all from the 10th game of 1967 through the 1971 opener, a stretch of 48 games; it was a tradition that continued under coaches Harland Svare, George Allen, and Tommy Prothro. But new owner Carroll Rosenbloom did not particularly like the Rams' uniforms, so in pursuit of a new look the team wore its seldom-used blue jerseys for most home games in 1972. During that season Rosenbloom's Rams also announced an intention to revive the old yellow-gold and blue colors for 1973, and asked fans to send in design ideas.

Yellow-gold was restored to the team's color scheme in 1973. The new uniform design consisted of yellow-gold pants and curling rams horns on the sleeves—yellow-gold horns curving from the shoulders to the arms on the blue jerseys, which featured golden numerals (a white border around the numerals, similar to the 1957 style, appeared for two preseason games and then disappeared). Players' names were in contrasting white. The white jersey had similarly shaped blue horns, numerals and names similar to the 1960's white jerseys. The white jerseys also had yellow-gold sleeves. The gold pants included a blue-white-blue tri-stripe, which was gradually widened through the 1970s and early 1980s. The blue socks initially featured two thin golden stripes in the middle of the blue section; they disappeared upon their move to St. Louis in 1995. From 1973 to 1976 the Rams were the only team to wear white cleats on the road and royal blue cleats at home; since 1977, they have worn white ones. The new golden helmet horns were of identical shape, but for the first time the horn was not factory-painted but instead a decal applied to the helmet. The decal was cut in sections and affixed to accommodate spaces for face-mask and chin-strap attachments, and so the horn curved farther around the ear hole. The jersey numerals were made thicker and blunter in 1975. The Rams primarily wore blue at home with this combination, but after 1977 occasionally wore white at home. The team wore its white jerseys for most of its 1978 home dates, including its postseason games with the Minnesota Vikings and the Dallas Cowboys—the latter is the only postseason game the Cowboys have ever won while outfitted in their blue jerseys. The gray face masks became navy blue in 1981. The Rams wore white jerseys exclusively in the 1982 and 1993 seasons, as well as other selected occasions throughout their 15 seasons in Anaheim.

On April 12, 2000, the St. Louis Rams debuted new logos, team colors and uniforms. The Rams' primary colors were changed from royal blue and yellow to Millennium Blue and New Century Gold. A new logo of a charging ram's head was added to the sleeves and gold stripes were added to the sides of the jerseys. The new gold pants no longer featured any stripes. Blue pants and white pants with a small gold stripe (an extension off the jersey stripe that ended in a point) were also an option with the Rams electing to wear the white set in a pre-season game in San Diego in 2001. The helmet design essentially remained the same as it was in 1948, except for updates to the coloring, navy blue field with gold horns. The 2000 rams' horn design featured a slightly wider separation at the helmet's center. Both home and away jerseys had a gold stripe that ran down each side, but that only lasted for the 2000 and 2001 seasons. Additionally, the TV numbers on the jerseys, which had previously been on the sleeve, moved up to the shoulder pad.

In 2003, the Rams wore blue pants with their white jerseys for a pair of early-season games, but after losses to the New York Giants and Seattle Seahawks, the Rams reverted to gold pants with their white jerseys. In 2005, the Rams wore the blue pants at home against Arizona and on the road against Dallas. In 2007, the Rams wore all possible combinations of their uniforms. They wore the blue tops and gold pants at home against Carolina, San Francisco, Cleveland, Seattle, and on the road against Dallas. They wore the blue tops and blue pants at home against Arizona, Atlanta, and Pittsburgh on Marshall Faulk night. They wore the blue tops and white pants on the road in Tampa Bay and at home against Green Bay. They wore white tops and gold pants at New Orleans and San Francisco. They wore white tops and white pants at Seattle and Arizona. And they wore white tops and blue pants at Baltimore and Cincinnati. In 2008, the Rams did away with the gold pants after they were used for only one regular-season game at Seattle. The blue jerseys with white pants and white jerseys with blue pants combinations were used most of the time. For the 2009 season, the Rams elected to wear the white pants with both jerseys for the majority of the time except the games against the Vikings and Texans (see below) where they wore the throwback jerseys from the 1999 season, week 2 in Washington when they wore gold pants with the blue jersey, and week 12 against Seattle when they wore blue pants with the blue jersey. The Rams ceased wearing the New Century gold pants after Nike took over as the NFL's uniform supplier in 2012.

During their time in St. Louis, the Rams had worn blue at home. Like most other teams playing in a dome, the Rams did not need to wear white to gain an advantage with the heat. The Rams wore their white jerseys and blue pants in St. Louis against the Dallas Cowboys, on October 19, 2008, forcing the Cowboys to wear their "unlucky" blue uniforms, and won the game 34–14. On October 21, 2012, the Rams wore white jerseys and white pants against the Green Bay Packers.

The NFL approved the use of throwback uniforms for the club, during the 2009 season, to celebrate the 10th anniversary of the 1999 Super Bowl championship. The Rams wore the throwback uniforms for two home games in 2009, on October 11 against the Minnesota Vikings and on December 20 against the Houston Texans. The Rams wore their 1999 throwbacks again on October 31, 2010, when they beat the Carolina Panthers 20–10. The throwbacks have since then seen action for two select regular-season games each year since. In 1994, the team's last season in Southern California, the Rams wore jerseys and pants replicating those of their 1951 championship season for their September games with the San Francisco 49ers and Kansas City Chiefs.

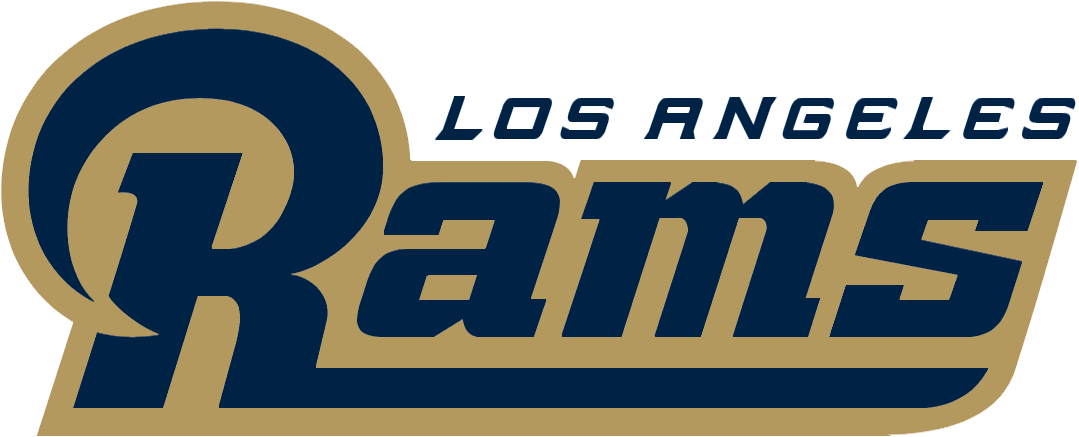
Los Angeles Rams initial 2016 wordmark

Four days after the NFL approved their return to Los Angeles, the team made slight changes to its branding. The only change to the team's wordmark logo was the location name, from St. Louis to Los Angeles, to reflect the team's move. The team's colors were retained. The Rams also announced there would be no significant changes to the team's uniforms, apart from the newly updated logos with the Los Angeles location name.

In a March 21, 2016, interview with the Los Angeles Times, team chief operating officer Kevin Demoff said that there would be no uniform change for the team until 2019 (the year that the new stadium was originally planned to open). However, the stadium completion was pushed back one year into 2020 in May 2017, pushing the rebrand back to 2020 along with it. On August 11, 2016, the team announced on Twitter that it would wear its all-white uniforms for five of the team's eight home games during the 2016 season as a nod to the Fearsome Foursome era; the Rams wore their alternative royal blue and gold throwback uniforms for the other two games at the Coliseum and wore their midnight blue jerseys at their international game at Twickenham Stadium.

Los Angeles Rams wordmark from the second half of 2016 to 2019

Throughout the 2016 season, the Rams' signage around the stadium, end zones, and other uses of the logo showed a variation that was only colored in blue and white, leading some fans to believe the team's upcoming rebrand would involve gold being completely dropped from the color scheme. For the 2017 season, the Rams announced they would be wearing helmets similar to the Fearsome Foursome era: Millennium blue helmets with white helmet horns and, voted on by fans, a white face mask. Fans also voted for a new pants design, which was a single blue stripe down the side of white pants, as well as an inverse design for road games. The team also began using the blue and white logo as their primary logo, confirming that they would be phasing out gold from their color scheme, although gold remained on the jerseys due to an NFL rule that teams must have the same jersey design for at least a minimum of five seasons. The Rams also announced a fan vote via Twitter to decide which two home games they would wear throwback uniforms. Fans selected the October 8, 2017, game against the Seahawks and the December 31, 2017, game against the 49ers, the same two opponents the Rams wore throwbacks against the prior season. In their Week 3 road game against the 49ers, the Rams also participated in NFL Color Rush, wearing throwback-style all-yellow uniforms with blue detailing and blue numbers, as well as yellow horns on the helmets and white stripes outlined in blue on the pants.

On July 27, 2018, the Rams announced that they would wear their throwback royal blue and yellow primary color uniform for home games at the Los Angeles Memorial Coliseum for the 2018 season. In conjunction with the change, the team retired its navy blue and metallic gold uniform. The Rams' white uniform remained unchanged, and its one alternate uniform is the yellow Color Rush uniform. Additionally, the team confirmed their new rebrand would take place in 2020 to coincide with the opening of their new home stadium, SoFi Stadium.

On March 23, 2020, the Rams officially unveiled a new logo set and color scheme. The new primary logo features stylized "LA" lettering with a ram's horn forming and spiraling out of the top of the "A", with gradients to show curvature similar to a real ram's horn. A website showcasing the new look says the letters were included "ensuring that the Rams are forever tied to the city of Los Angeles." The secondary logo is a ram's head that combines several elements from previous logos of the team. New wordmarks were introduced as well, and the team's new colors were revealed as "Rams Royal" (royal blue) and "Sol" (yellow). Despite the optimism of the Rams' design team; the logo was very poorly received by a majority of the fanbase. COO Kevin Demoff stated that the two key elements the team kept in mind were the horns, which had long been symbolic of the team, and the royal blue and yellow color scheme. Demoff stated that the team had studied every single previous look for inspiration, and the goal was to "weave together this history into a new, modern look...respecting our past and representing our future."

The Rams officially revealed the club's new uniform designs on May 13, 2020. The team initially introduced three combinations, two of which included a royal blue jersey with yellow and white gradient numbers, as well as yellow sleeve striping similar to the new shape of the horns. Blue pants with similar gradient stripes were introduced, alongside yellow pants with solid white and blue stripes. The road jersey was given a new "bone grey" color, which featured white and yellow sleeve patterns and blue numbers. Bone grey pants were featured alongside the road jersey, which included a white stripe with a thinner yellow stripe. All three combinations used a brand new metallic blue helmet design, featuring blue facemasks and the new styling of the horns similar to the team's logos. Later, however, the Rams wore three additional combinations: blue jerseys and bone grey pants, bone grey jerseys and blue pants and bone grey jerseys and yellow pants. They also wore bone grey socks as a variation to their all-bone grey look.

On July 13, 2021, the Rams unveiled a white alternate uniform. This set was a modernized version of the team's 1973–1999 road uniform set, complete with blue rounded numbers and "Rams" patch on the left shoulder. Initially, the Rams wore yellow pants with the alternate white uniforms, but in Week 10 of the 2021 season, they wore blue pants with this set. The Rams chose the white alternates with yellow pants as their Super Bowl LVI uniform.

On July 30, 2022, the Rams announced that the white uniform would supplant the bone uniform as its primary road uniform.

On April 25, 2025, Nike and the NFL announced "Rivalries", a series of location-inspired uniforms to be worn for one game during each of the next three seasons by each team from two divisions, the first two of which being the NFC West and AFC East. On August 28, the Rams revealed their Rivalry uniform, which featured a primary color of "Midnight Blue", a darkened, nearly-black shade of blue. The horns on each sleeve remained yellow, but were slightly re-shaped to be more similar to the team's vintage sleeve horn designs. The sleeves also featured royal blue, which faded into midnight blue via a gradient pattern inspired by the ETFE roofing texture pattern at SoFi Stadium. The uniforms' numbers were white, and featured a perforated pattern that also took inspiration from the stadium's roof. The base color of the helmet and facemask was changed from royal blue to midnight blue.

On April 16, 2026, the Rams revealed tweaks to their branding and uniforms. The primary logo was changed to feature an all-yellow look without gradients, while the secondary logo was modified to also remove gradients while adding a yellow eye. The primary uniforms were tweaked to include the horn shapes from the Rivalries uniform, while the "name tags" featuring the team wordmarks and all gradients on the numbers and pant stripes were removed. White pants with blue and yellow stripes were also introduced to the team's uniform rotation. On July 23, new alternate uniforms were released: a "Classic Sol" yellow uniform which paid homage to the 1951 championship team, and a "Fearsome White" uniform inspired by the "Fearsome Foursome" era of the mid 1960s and early 1970s. The former uniform, which featured sleeve stripes and blue block numbers, is paired with white pants accented by a blue-yellow-blue tricolor stripe and their regular blue helmets with yellow horn decals, while the latter uniform contained no yellow elements, added shoulder stripes and midnight blue accents, and featured a blue helmet with white horn decals.

== Season-by-season record ==
The table below shows the five most recent NFL regular season records along with their respective finish in the NFL playoffs. The Los Angeles Rams appeared in the postseason in four of the five last seasons, including a Super Bowl championship in the 2021 NFL season. Recent notable honors with members of the Los Angeles Rams include NFL Coach of the Year in 2017 for Sean McVay, Super Bowl MVP for Cooper Kupp in 2021, and NFL MVP for Matthew Stafford in 2025.

Note: GP = Games played, W = Wins, L = Losses, W–L% = Winning percentage

Season	GP	W	L	W–L%	Finish	Playoffs
2021	17	12	5	.706	1st, NFC West	NFL champions, 23–20 (Bengals)
2022	17	5	12	.294	3rd, NFC West	did not qualify
2023	17	10	7	.588	2nd, NFC West	Lost in Wild Card, 23–24 (Lions)
2024	17	10	7	.588	1st, NFC West	Lost in Divisional, 22–28 (Eagles)
2025	17	12	5	.706	2nd, NFC West	Lost in Championship, 31–27 (Seahawks)

== Notable players ==
=== Current roster ===
Los Angeles Rams roster
Quarterbacks (QB): 13 Stetson Bennett; 15 Ty Simpson; 9 Matthew Stafford; Running backs (RB): 24 Blake Corum; 20 Ronnie Rivers; 23 Kyren Williams; Wide receivers (WR): 8 Tutu Atwell; 6 CJ Daniels; 4 Konata Mumpfield; 14 Xavier Smith; Tight ends (TE): 87 Davis Allen; 89 Tyler Higbee; 86 Max Klare; 84 Colby Parkinson	Offensive linemen (OL): 73 Steve Avila G; 69 Kevin Dotson G; 77 Alaric Jackson T; 50 Beaux Limmer G; 71 Warren McClendon T; 66 Bill Murray G; 68 David Quessenberry T; 65 Coleman Shelton C; 79 Keagen Trost T; Defensive linemen (DL): 90 Tyler Davis DE; 99 Aaron Donald DE; 55 Braden Fiske DE; 57 Ty Hamilton NT; 52 Larrell Murchison DE	Linebackers (LB): 47 Wesley Bailey OLB; 56 Shaun Dolac ILB; 95 Myles Garrett OLB; 94 Desjuan Johnson OLB; 53 Nate Landman ILB; 59 Darryl Peterson III OLB; 48 Omar Speights ILB; 10 Josaiah Stewart OLB; 44 Grant Stuard ILB; 0 Byron Young OLB; Defensive backs (DB): 3 Kamren Curl S; 1 Emmanuel Forbes CB; 5 Kamren Kinchens S; 37 Quentin Lake S; 21 Cam Lampkin CB; 2 Jaylen McCollough S; 22 Trent McDuffie CB; 36 Maximus Pulley S; 30 Josh Wallace CB; Special teams (ST): 49 Joe Cardona LS; 42 Ethan Evans P; 16 Joshua Karty K; 19 Brandon McManus K	Practice squad: 45 Nick Andersen S; 11 Alex Bachman WR; 14 Jack Bouwmeester P (IPP); 25 Nyzier Fourqurean CB; 72 Blake Hance G; 34 Tanner Ingle S; 27 David Long CB; 54 Eric Kendricks LB; 43 Jake McQuaide LS; 98 Jaxson Moi DT; 93 Bill Norton DE; 81 Brennan Presley WR; 58 Jon Rhattigan ILB; 82 Tyler Scott WR; 83 Dan Villari TE; 32 Jordan Waters RB; 26 Damarion Williams CB; Reserve: 17 Davante Adams WR (IR); 2 Matthew Caldwell QB (IR); 33 Dean Connors RB (IR); 67 Justin Dedich G (IR); 18 Terrance Ferguson TE (IR); 97 Poona Ford NT (IR); 19 Blake Grupe K (IR); 63 Dylan McMahon C (IR); 12 Puka Nacua WR (IR); 91 Kobie Turner DE (IR/DFR); 51 Eddie Walls III OLB (IR); 35 Jaylen Watson CB (IR); 88 Jordan Whittington KR (IR) 51 active, 16 practice squad (1 IPP), 13 reserve As of November 17, 2026. Rookies in italics.; Roster; Depth chart; Transactions

=== Retired numbers ===
Numbers that have been retired by the Rams:

Los Angeles Rams retired numbers
No.	Player	Position	Tenure	Retired
7	Bob Waterfield	QB	1945–1952	1952
28	Marshall Faulk	RB	1999–2005	December 21, 2007
29	Eric Dickerson	RB	1983–1987	
74	Merlin Olsen	DT	1962–1976	December 12, 1982
75	Deacon Jones	DE	1961–1971	September 27, 2009
78	Jackie Slater	OT	1976–1995	November 24, 1996
80	Isaac Bruce	WR	1994–2007	October 31, 2010
85	Jack Youngblood	DE	1971–1984	December 23, 1985

=== Hall of Famers ===
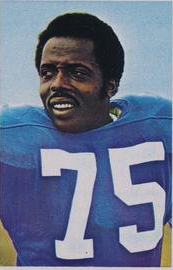
Deacon Jones

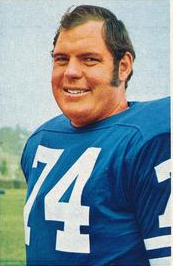
Merlin Olsen

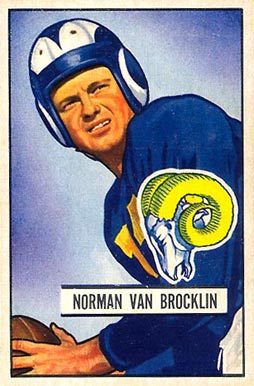
Norm Van Brocklin

Former Rams players in the Pro Football Hall of Fame include Isaac Bruce (80), Eric Dickerson (29), Marshall Faulk (28), Kevin Greene (91), Tom Mack (65), Merlin Olsen (74), Orlando Pace (76), Jackie Slater (78), Norm Van Brocklin (11), Kurt Warner (13), and Jack Youngblood (85). Other players such as Jerome Bettis (36), Bob Brown (76), Dick "Night Train" Lane (81), Ollie Matson (33), Joe Namath (12), Andy Robustelli (84), and Ron Yary (73) also played for the Rams, but spent the majority of their careers with other teams.

Rams head coaches in the Hall of Fame include George Allen (1966–1970), Sid Gillman (1955–1959), and Dick Vermeil (1997–1999), though all of them spent a majority of their head coaching careers outside of the Rams organization. Other Rams head coaches including Earl "Dutch" Clark (1939–1942) and Waterfield (1960–1962) are also Hall of Fame inductees, but were selected primarily as players (Waterfield for the Rams, Clark for the Detroit Lions).

Dan Reeves, who owned the Rams from 1941 to 1971, was inducted into the Hall of Fame as a contributor in 1967. Other figures who began their careers in professional football with the franchise are members of the Hall of Fame as contributors, but were elected more on the basis of their accomplishments outside the Rams:

- Pete Rozelle served the Rams as public relations director and later general manager, but his induction was based mainly on his 29 years as NFL commissioner.
- Tex Schramm was a Rams executive for nine years, but had his greatest impact as president and general manager of the Dallas Cowboys for their first 29 years of existence.
- Gil Brandt was a Rams scout for three seasons, but like Schramm, his greatest impact was his involvement with the Dallas Cowboys for their first 29 years of existence.

Cleveland / St. Louis / Los Angeles Rams Hall of Famers
Players
No.	Name	Inducted	Position(s)	Tenure
36	Jerome Bettis	2015	RB	1993–1995
76	Orlando Pace	2016	OT	1997–2008
91	Kevin Greene	2016	LB	1985–1992
76	Bob Brown	2004	OT	1969–1970
80	Isaac Bruce	2020	WR	1994–2007
29	Eric Dickerson	1999	RB	1983–1987
28	Marshall Faulk	2011	RB	1999–2006
55	Tom Fears	1970	End	1948–1956
40	Elroy "Crazy Legs" Hirsch	1968	RB, WR	1949–1957
75	Deacon Jones	1980	DE	1961–1971
65	Tom Mack	1999	G	1966–1978
74	Merlin Olsen	1982	DT	1962–1976
67, 48	Les Richter	2011	LB, K	1954–1962
78	Jackie Slater	2001	OT	1976–1995
11	Norm Van Brocklin	1971	QB, P	1949–1957
10, 13	Kurt Warner	2017	QB	1998–2003
7	Bob Waterfield	1965	QB, DB, K, P	1945–1952
33	Ollie Matson	1972	RB	1959–1962
85	Jack Youngblood	2001	DE	1971–1984
Coaches and Contributors
Name		Inducted	Position(s)	Tenure
Dick Vermeil		2022	Coach	1969, 1971–1973, 1997–1999
George Allen		2002	Coach	1966–1970
Dan Reeves		1967	Owner	1941–1971

=== St. Louis Football Ring of Fame ===
Former Rams were included in the St. Louis Football Ring of Fame, which was located in The Dome at America's Center. All players included are Hall of Famers, but there have been a few exceptions for team executives and coaches.

== Notable coaches ==
=== Current staff ===
Los Angeles Rams staff
Front office: Owner/CEO – Stan Kroenke; President – Kevin Demoff; General manager – Les Snead; Assistant general manager – John McKay; COO – Tony Pastoors; Senior advisor to general manager – Ray Farmer; Senior personnel executive & deputy chief of college scouting staff – Taylor Morton; Senior personnel executives – Marty Barrett, Ted Monago, Chris Driggers, Phil Savage; Senior scouting executive – Billy Johnson; Director of pro personnel – Matt Waugh; Director, scouting, strategy & analytics – Nicole Blake; Head coaches: Head coach – Sean McVay; Assistant head coach – Kliff Kingsbury; Offensive coaches: Offensive coordinator – Nathan Scheelhaase; Associate coordinator/quarterbacks – Dave Ragone; Running backs – Ron Gould; Wide receivers – Rob Calabrese; Assistant wide receivers – Robert Woods; Tight ends – Scott Huff; Assistant tight ends/game management coordinator – Dan Shamash; Offensive line – Ryan Wendell; Assistant offensive line – Brian Allen; Assistant offensive line – Zak Kromer; Senior offensive assistant – Brian Johnson; Senior offensive assistant/wide receivers – Eric Yarber	Defensive coaches: Defensive coordinator – Chris Shula; Defensive line/run game coordinator – Giff Smith; Outside linebackers – Joe Coniglio; Inside linebackers – Greg Williams; Defensive backs/pass game coordinator – Jimmy Lake; Safeties – Chris Beake; Assistant defensive backs – Michael Hunter; Pass rush coordinator – Drew Wilkins; Senior defensive assistant – Robert Wright; Special teams coaches: Special teams coordinator – Ray Ventrone; Assistant special teams coach – Kyle Hoke; Strength and conditioning: Director of strength training and performance – Justin Lovett; Assistant strength and conditioning – Dustin Woods; → Coaching staff → Front office → More NFL staffs

== Radio and television ==
The Rams were the first NFL team to televise their home games; in a sponsorship arrangement with Admiral television, all home games of the 1950 NFL season were shown locally. The Rams also televised games in the early 1950s. The 1951 NFL Championship Game was the first championship game televised coast-to-coast (via the DuMont Network). During the team's original stint in Los Angeles all games were broadcast on KMPC radio (710 AM); play-by-play announcers were Bob Kelley (who accompanied the team from Cleveland and worked until his death in 1966), Dick Enberg (1966–1977), Al Wisk (1978–1979), Bob Starr (1980–1989, 1993), Eddie Doucette (1990), Paul Olden (1991–1992), and Steve Physioc (1994). Analysts included Gil Stratton, Steve Bailey, Dave Niehaus (1968–1972), Don Drysdale (1973–1976), Dick Bass (1977–1986), Jack Youngblood (1987–1991), Jack Snow (1992–1994), and Deacon Jones (1994).

During the team's stint in St. Louis it had a few broadcast partners. From 1995 to 1999 the Rams games were broadcast on KSD 93.7 FM. From 2000 to 2008 KLOU FM 103.3 was the Rams' flagship station with Steve Savard as the play-by-play announcer. Until October 2005, Jack Snow had been the color analyst since 1992, dating back to the team's original stint in Los Angeles. Snow left the booth after suffering an illness and died in January 2006. Former Rams offensive line coach Jim Hanifan joined KLOU as the color analyst the year after Jack Snow's departure. From 2009 until 2015, the Rams' flagship radio station was 101.1 FM WXOS, a sports station in St. Louis affiliated with ESPN Radio. Savard served as the play-by-play man with D'Marco Farr in the color spot and Brian Stull reporting from the field. Preseason games not shown on a national broadcast network were seen on KTVI in St. Louis; preseason games are produced by the Kroenke-owned Denver-based Altitude Sports and Entertainment, which shares common ownership with the Rams.

Months after the Rams returned to Los Angeles, it was announced on June 9, 2016, that their anchor station would be CBS' O&O station KCBS-TV will air pre-season games that are not on national television. The KCBS broadcasting team includes Andrew Siciliano (play-by-play announcer), Pro Football Hall of Fame former running backs Eric Dickerson and Marshall Faulk providing color commentary. In 2017 NFL Network analyst Daniel Jeremiah replaced Dickerson. KCBS's Jill Arrington and Rams reporters Dani Klupenger and Myles Simmons also provide insight; a pre-game show airs a half-hour before each game in addition former Rams quarterback Jim Everett and former defensive back and sports anchor/director Jim Hill provides an inside look into each upcoming game with player profiles, live interviews from booth and sideline updates and a 30-minute postgame that provides game breakdown, film analysis, and press conference look-ins with head coach Sean McVay and select players. Spanish-language game coverage is provided by Spanish-language sister stations Univision 34 (one home game) and UniMás 46 (two away games) in Spanish.

In 2016, the Rams' news and highlights where shown on Rams Primetime Live on KABC-TV on Saturday nights after college football games during the regular season, hosted by sports anchor Rob Fukuzaki, sports reporter Ashley Brewer and traffic reporter Alysha Del Valle. Starting with the 2021 preseason, KABC-TV is televising Rams preseason games, along with the weekly Rams 360 show.

Under the league's current national TV contracts for regular-season games, Fox O&O KTTV carries the bulk of the team's games due to Fox holding the rights to the NFC contract, along with Thursday Night Football. KCBS carries Sunday afternoon games in which the Rams host an AFC team (pending any Rams Sunday game that the league later decides in mid-season to "cross-flex" between Fox and CBS). KNBC airs NBC Sunday Night Football and some selected Thursday night games produced by NBC. As for games that air on ESPN's Monday Night Football, KABC simulcasts these cable games carries those games as the two channels share common ownership. The league's blackout policy is not currently in effect, meaning that besides road games, all Rams home games are televised in the Los Angeles market, regardless of attendance. If the Chargers and Rams are both playing at the same time on Sunday afternoons on a certain network (for instance, a Rams road game against an AFC opponent at the same time as a Charger home game with an NFC opponent with both on Fox, or the reverse where the Rams are on the road against an AFC opponent and the Chargers are at home against an AFC opponent on CBS), in the Los Angeles market, Fox and CBS have authorization to carry the additional game on their secondary sister stations; Fox games air on KCOP-TV, while CBS games are aired on KCAL-TV.

On June 20, 2016, the Rams announced their Los Angeles-area radio broadcasting rights agreements. As of 2016, the Rams' official flagship radio station is KSPN-AM, while the team's official FM radio station is KCBS-FM (owned by Entercom). On July 19, 2016, the Rams announced that they had reached an agreement with KWKW for Spanish-language coverage of the team. The Rams' radio English broadcast team is J.B. Long (play-by-play voice announcer), Maurice Jones-Drew (color analyst), and D'Marco Farr (sideline reporter) with Mario Solis and Troy Santiago comprising the Spanish broadcast team. ESPN 710 also broadcasts a three-hour pre-game broadcast show featuring Steve Mason, Kirk Morrison (former NFL linebacker) and Eric Davis as well as a two-hour post-game show with Travis Rodgers, Morrison, and Davis, Jeff Biggs will cover the Rams during halftime.

=== Radio affiliates ===
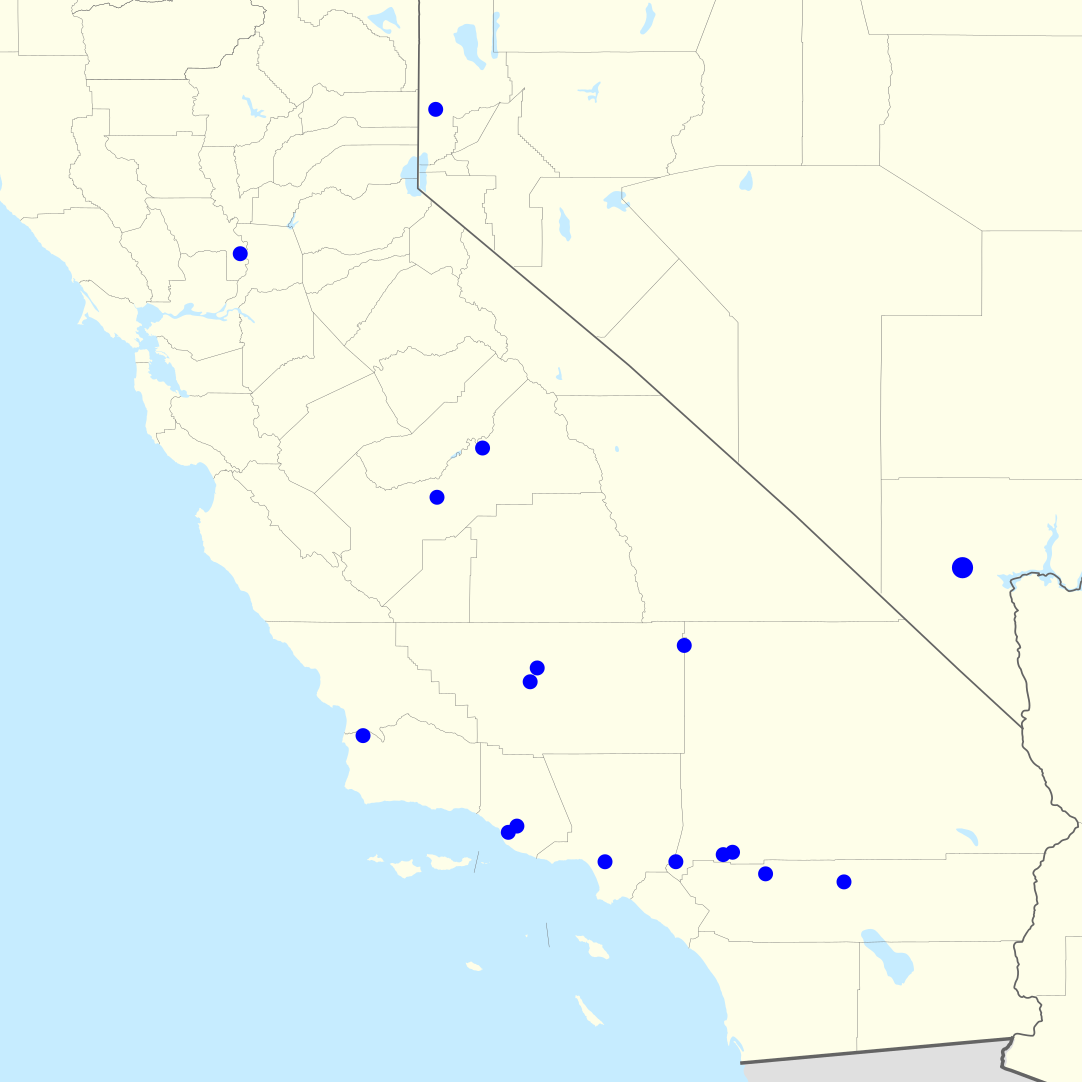
Map of radio affiliates

==== English ====
City	Call Sign	Radio Frequency
Los Angeles (Flagship station)	KSPN	710 AM
Los Angeles (Flagship station)	KCBS	93.1 FM
Bakersfield	KHTY	970 AM
Banning	KMET	1490 AM
Fresno	KKBZ	105.1 FM
Palm Springs	KKUU	103.9 FM
Ridgecrest	KWDJ	1360 AM
Riverside	KTIE	590 AM
San Bernardino	KTIE	590 AM
Santa Barbara	KTMS	990 AM / 97.9 FM
Santa Maria	KSMA	1240 AM / 99.5 FM

==== Spanish ====
City	Call Sign	Radio Frequency
Los Angeles (Flagship station)	KWKW	1330 AM
Bakersfield	KWAC	1490 AM
Fresno	KGST	1600 AM
Oxnard	KXLM	102.9 FM
Oxnard	KOXR	910 AM
Pomona	KTMZ	1220 AM
Riverside	KCAL	1410 AM
San Bernardino	KCAL	1410 AM
San Diego	KFBG	100.7 FM
Ventura	KXLM	102.9 FM
Ventura	KOXR	910 AM

== See also ==
- Forbes list of the most valuable sports teams
- History of the National Football League in Los Angeles
- Sports in Los Angeles
- List of Super Bowl champions

Preceded by Green Bay Packers	NFL champions Cleveland Rams; 1945	Succeeded by Chicago Bears
Preceded by Cleveland Browns	NFL champions Los Angeles Rams; 1951	Succeeded by Detroit Lions
Preceded by Denver Broncos	Super Bowl champions St. Louis Rams; 1999 (XXXIV)	Succeeded by Baltimore Ravens
Preceded by Tampa Bay Buccaneers	Super Bowl champions Los Angeles Rams; 2021 (LVI)	Succeeded by Kansas City Chiefs
