= List of Los Angeles Rams broadcasters =

This article is a list of the Los Angeles Rams broadcasters.

The Los Angeles Rams were the first National Football League (NFL) team to televise both their home and away games during the 1950 NFL season. The 1951 NFL Championship Game was the first Championship Game televised coast-to-coast.

== St. Louis ==
After relocating to St. Louis, from 1995–1999 the Rams games were broadcast on KSD 93.7 FM, and simulcast on KFNS 590 AM. Preseason games not shown on a national broadcast network were seen on KTVI, Channel 2, and were also seen in L.A. on KCOP, "MyNetworkTV channel 13."

=== Radio ===
For the first four years in St Louis, Rams radio broadcasts were led on play-by-play by veteran ABC and CBS voice, Gary Bender. Following Bender's move to be the radio voice of the Chicago Bears after the 1998 season, KSDK's Sports Director Mike Bush took over radio play-by-play for the Rams' 1999 Super Bowl Season.

From 2000–2008, KLOU FM 103.3 was the Rams flagship station with Steve Savard as the play-by-play announcer. Until October 2005, Jack Snow had been the color analyst for nearly 20 years, dating back to the team's first stint in the Los Angeles area. Snow left the booth after suffering an illness and died in January 2006. Former Rams offensive line coach and former St. Louis Cardinals head coach Jim Hanifan joined the KLOU as the color analyst the year after Jack Snow's departure. They were joined by analyst D'Marco Farr and sideline reporter Malcolm Briggs.

From 2009– 2015, the Rams' flagship radio station was 101 ESPN which was at the time a new sports station in St. Louis. For these broadcasts, Steve Savard was the play by play announcer, flanked by color commentator D'Marco Farr. Brian Stull served as the sideline reporter, and the pregame and postgame coverage was anchored by St. Louis coaching legend Jim Hanifan, along with hosts Randy Karraker for pregame and Cliff Saunders for postgame, among other 101 ESPN personalities.

Year	Flagship Station	Play-by-Play	Color Commentator
1995–1998	KSD 93.7 FM	Gary Bender	Jack Snow
1999	KSD 93.7 FM	Mike Bush	Jack Snow
2000–2005	KLOU FM 103.3	Steve Savard	Jack Snow
2005-2008	KLOU FM 103.3	Steve Savard	Jim Hanifan
2009–2015	WXOS (101 ESPN)	Steve Savard	D'Marco Farr

== Los Angeles ==
=== Radio ===
Years	Flagship Station	Play-by-Play	Color Commentator	Sideline Reporter
2016	ESPN LA 710 AM | 100.3 the Sound	J.B. Long	Maurice Jones-Drew	D'Marco Farr
2017–present	ESPN LA 710 AM | 93.1 Jack FM	J.B. Long	Maurice Jones-Drew	D'Marco Farr

The Los Angeles Rams’ flagship radio stations are KSPN (710 AM) and KCBS-FM (93.1 FM) in the Los Angeles market. Other stations around California, including 50,000 watt AM 1090 XEPRS in Tijuana-San Diego ("The Mighty 1090") also carry the broadcasts.

Former Tampa Bay Buccaneers reporter and TNT and CW Sports announcer J.B. Long is the Rams' play-by-play announcer, with former Pro Bowl running back Maurice Jones-Drew serving as the color analyst, and D'Marco Farr works as the sideline reporter. In the team's original Los Angeles stint, 710 AM (in its KMPC years) was the team's radio flagship for nearly the team's entire first tenure in the region.

=== Television ===
Year	Flagship Station	Play-by-Play	Color Commentator	Sideline Reporter
2016–2019	KCBS-TV 2.1 | CBS 2	J.B. Long	Varies	Varies
2020–present	KABC-TV 7.1 | ABC 7	J.B. Long	Maurice Jones-Drew; Mina Kimes	Curt Sandoval

ABC affiliate KABC-TV serves as the team's official preseason television home with J.B. Long as play by play announcer. From 2016 to 2019, CBS affiliate KCBS-TV served as the team's preseason television home. Both stations, in conjunction with the Rams, also had produce ancillary team programming, with KCBS airing the Rams on 2:The Coaches Show (hosted by KCBS-TV sports anchor and director Jim Hill) on Saturday evenings during game weeks. Rams preseason games are also carried in Spanish, with Univision-owned KMEX and its sister station, KFTR (UniMas) originating the broadcasts. Univision's KABE and KBTF (UniMas) broadcast those games in the neighboring Bakersfield market.

The majority of Rams regular season games are aired on Fox affiliate, KTTV, by virtue of being members of Fox having the rights to NFC games, as part of parent network Fox's NFL Sunday afternoon package. When the Rams host an AFC opponent, games air on CBS affiliate KCBS-TV as part of CBS's coverage and Sunday Night Football games that air on KNBC. Monday Night Football games are also televised in the Los Angeles area on KABC-TV when the Rams play a Monday night game.
