= Chris Duncan =

American baseball player (1981–2019)

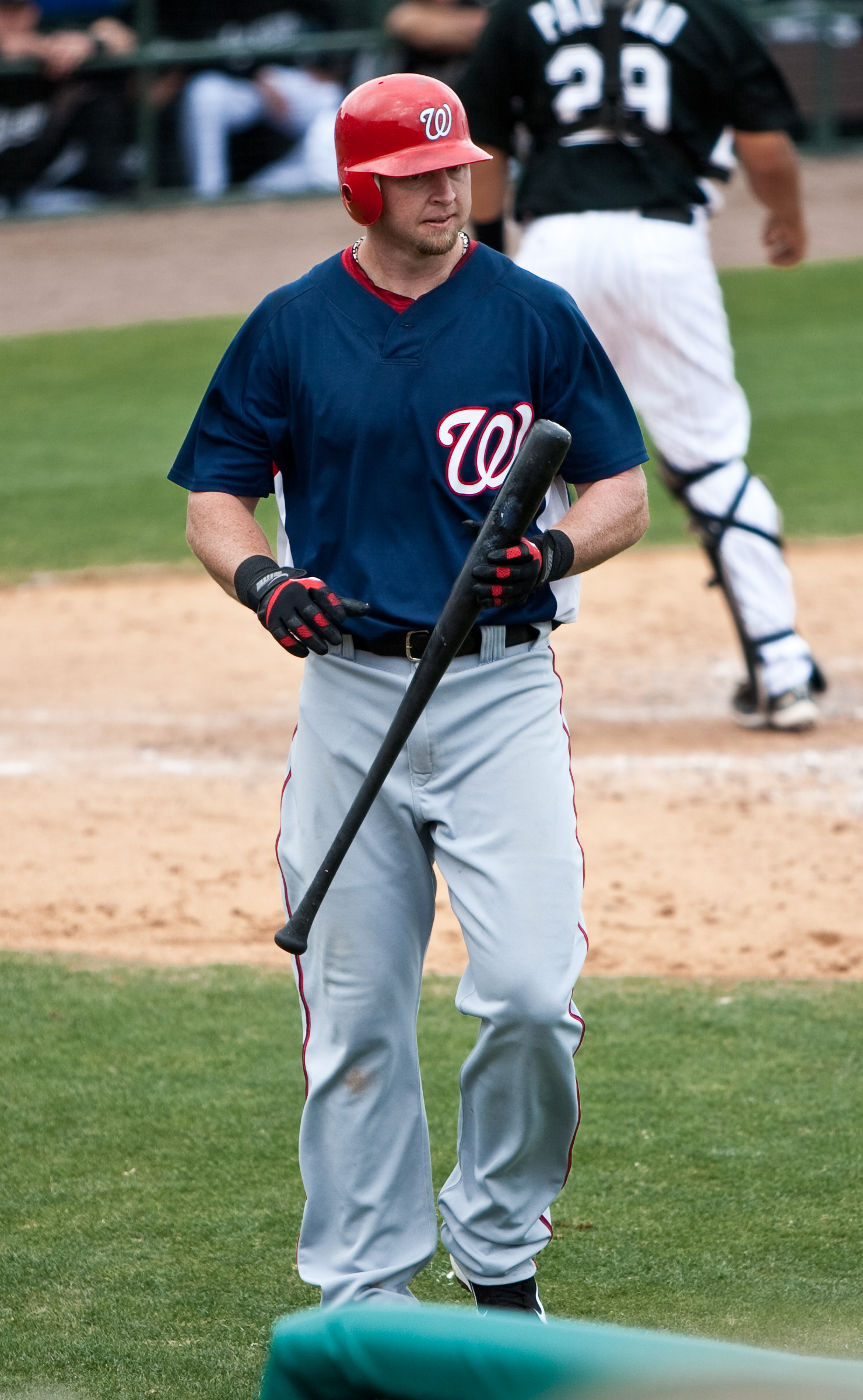
- Duncan with the Washington Nationals
- Left fielder / First baseman
- Born: May 5, 1981; Tucson, Arizona, U.S.
- Died: September 6, 2019 (aged 38); Tucson, Arizona, U.S.
- Batted: Left Threw: Right

MLB debut
- September 10, 2005, for the St. Louis Cardinals

Last MLB appearance
- July 20, 2009, for the St. Louis Cardinals

MLB statistics
- Batting average: .257
- Home runs: 55
- Runs batted in: 175
- Stats at Baseball Reference

Teams
- St. Louis Cardinals (2005–2009)

Career highlights and awards
- World Series champion (2006)

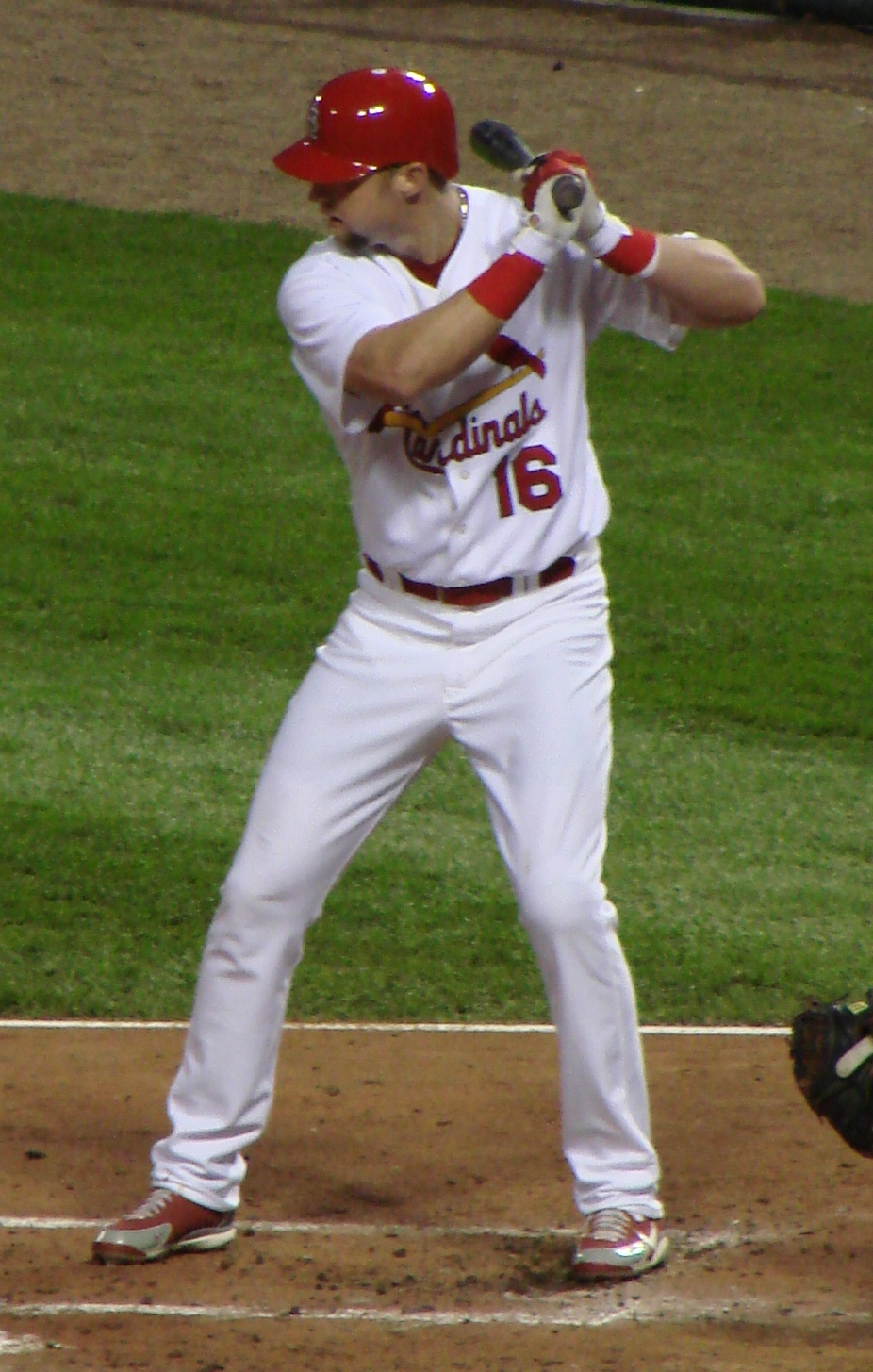
Duncan batting for the St. Louis Cardinals in 2007

Christopher Edwin Duncan (May 5, 1981 – September 6, 2019) was an American professional baseball left fielder and first baseman. He played for the St. Louis Cardinals of Major League Baseball (MLB) from 2005 through 2009.

He was the youngest son of Dave Duncan, a former catcher and retired pitching coach for the Cardinals. His older brother, Shelley, was also a first baseman and outfielder in MLB. After his playing career, he worked as a mid-day radio program host on WXOS, the St. Louis ESPN Radio affiliate.

== Early life ==
Duncan was a graduate of Canyon del Oro High School in the Tucson suburb of Oro Valley, Arizona. While there he was a teammate of Ian Kinsler. The St. Louis Cardinals selected Duncan in the first round (46th overall) in the 1999 Major League Baseball draft as a supplemental pick for loss of free agent Delino DeShields to the Baltimore Orioles.

== Playing career ==
Duncan made his professional debut with the Johnson City Cardinals of the Appalachian League shortly after his 1999 signing. For the season, he batted .214 with six home runs. He spent 2000 and parts of 2001 and 2002 in Class A, advancing to Double-A by 2003. In 2005, he reached Triple-A, appearing in 128 games for the Memphis Redbirds, batting .265 with 21 home runs.

Duncan made his major league debut on September 10, 2005. He appeared in nine MLB games over the next month, batting 2-for-10 (.200). On October 2, 2005, he became the last player to hit a regular season home run at Busch Memorial Stadium.

=== 2006 ===
After spending most of the first half of the 2006 season working his way into the regular roster, Duncan hit very well and ended the season with impressive power numbers. In 2006, he was third in all of baseball behind David Ortiz and Ryan Howard in homers per at bat for players with at least 75 at bats. For the season, Duncan hit 22 home runs.

In the 2006 World Series, Duncan appeared in three of the five games, going 1-for-8 with one RBI. He committed an error in the fourth inning of Game 5 which was promptly followed by a two-run homer by Sean Casey, and misplayed a fly ball by Casey, which was ruled a double, in the sixth inning. However, Duncan and the Cardinals won the game and the Series, defeating the Detroit Tigers four games to one. Following the 2006 season, Duncan was named the team's Rookie of the Year.

=== 2007 ===
Duncan became a regular starter for the Cardinals in 2007, playing 127 of the team's 162 games that season. He batted .259/.354/.480, hitting 21 home runs (second on team) and 70 runs batted in (RBIs) (second on team), and third in doubles (20). He started 90 games in the outfield, committing two errors. He also finished second in total bases (180). He led the team in strikeouts with 123.

On September 20, 2007, Duncan underwent surgery for a sports hernia. It was successful and he returned to the clubhouse on September 22. His brother, Shelley, also suffered a sports hernia; the brothers were very competitive and had been trying to outdo one another in their workouts.

=== 2008 ===
In 2008, after hitting .252 in 127 at bats, Duncan was sent down to his former team, the Triple-A Memphis Redbirds, on May 30. Joe Mather took his spot on the Major League roster. Duncan was recalled in June to fill the hole at first base, which was left open after Albert Pujols went on the disabled list for a period of 15 days. He would spend most of his time in the outfield after Pujols returned to the lineup.

On July 22, Duncan was placed on the disabled list after experiencing severe discomfort in his arm, hand, and neck. The club called the injury a "pinched nerve". On August 2, it was reported that Duncan would miss the rest of the 2008 season after having surgery to address a herniated cervical disk in his neck. He ended the season with a .248 batting average, six home runs, and 27 RBIs over 222 at bats.

=== 2009 ===
Duncan successfully recovered from the surgery that ended his 2008 season, however, hit only .227, with five home runs and 32 RBIs in 260 at bats with the Cardinals. On July 22, Duncan was optioned to the Cardinals' triple-A affiliate, the Memphis Redbirds. A day later, he was traded to the Boston Red Sox along with a player-to-be-named-later or cash for shortstop Julio Lugo and cash considerations.

The Red Sox assigned Duncan to their triple-A affiliate, the Pawtucket Red Sox. After batting only .188 with two home runs and ten RBIs at Pawtucket, Boston released Duncan on August 21, 2009.

=== Late career ===
On January 19, 2010, Duncan signed a minor league contract with the Washington Nationals with an invitation to spring training. He played for the Syracuse Chiefs of the Triple-A International League in 2010, his final professional season, batting .191 with seven home runs in 82 games.

== Post-playing career ==
Beginning on October 2, 2011, Duncan was a host for WXOS, the ESPN Radio affiliate in St. Louis. He began on the nightly program "Stully and Duncan." On January 4, 2012, he was replaced by former Fast Lane commentator Bob Ramsey, making the show "Stully and Rammer", while he moved to co-host "The Fast Lane" with Randy Karraker and former St. Louis Rams defensive tackle and Super Bowl XXXIV champion D'Marco Farr. He was also a co-host of "The Turn" with Anthony Stalter.

== Illness and death ==
In October 2012, Duncan was diagnosed with a brain tumor and underwent chemotherapy.

On January 9, 2019, it was announced that Duncan was taking a permanent leave of absence from his ESPN radio show to continue his fight against glioblastoma.

Duncan died from brain cancer in Tucson on September 6, 2019.

== See also ==
- List of second-generation Major League Baseball players
