= KTIE =

Talk radio station in San Bernardino, California

Coordinates: 34°04′20″N 117°17′55.2″W

- San Bernardino, California; United States
- Broadcast area: Inland Empire
- Frequency: 590 kHz
- Branding: AM 590 The Answer

Programming
- Language: English
- Format: Conservative talk
- Affiliations: Fox News Radio; Salem Radio Network; Los Angeles Rams Radio Network

Ownership
- Owner: Salem Media Group; (Salem Communications Holding Corporation)
- Sister stations: KKLA-FM; KRLA

History
- First air date: February 10, 1925
- Former call signs: KFWC (1925–1929); KFXM (1929–1988); KRSO (1988–1994); KHTX (1994–1995); KSZZ (1995–2002); KRLH (2002–2003)
- Call sign meaning: Keen Talk of the Inland Empire

Technical information
- Licensing authority: FCC
- Facility ID: 58808
- Class: B
- Power: 2,500 watts (day); 960 watts (night)

Links
- Public license information: Public file; LMS
- Webcast: Listen live
- Website: am590theanswer.com

KTIE (590 AM, "AM 590 The Answer") is a commercial radio station licensed to San Bernardino, California, United States. It is owned by the Salem Media Group, with studios on University Avenue in Riverside, California, and airs a conservative talk radio format. The station serves the Inland Empire of California, including San Bernardino, Riverside, Redlands and Lake Arrowhead.

KTIE transmits using a three-tower array, on Auto Center Drive West in San Bernardino.

== History ==
=== Early years ===
The station was first licensed on February 10, 1925, as KFWC, to Lawrence E. Wall and C. S. Myers in Upland, California. It was the first radio station in the Inland Empire. In 1926, the station moved to San Bernardino, and the call letters were changed to KFXM on September 24, 1929. A San Bernardino transmitter site was on the summit of Mount San Bernardino, about 25 miles (40 km) east of the city. KFXM was received across most of Southern California, including Los Angeles and San Diego.

Following his service during WWII, Ernie Ford was a radio announcer at KFXM. He was assigned to host an early morning country music disc jockey program, Bar Nothin' Ranch Time. To differentiate himself, he created the personality of "Tennessee Ernie", a wild, madcap, exaggerated hillbilly. He became popular in the area and was soon hired away by Pasadena's KXLA radio.

On January 10, 1948, KFXM moved to 590 kHz, as an affiliate of the Mutual Broadcasting System and the Don Lee Network. An advertisement in the San Bernardino Sun newspaper proclaimed "eight times greater coverage for your Mutual-Don Lee Network programs."

=== Top 40 Sound ===
From 1959 to 1985, KFXM was a popular Top 40 station in the San Bernardino/Riverside radio market. KFXM was home to popular disc jockeys such as Larry Lujack, Lyle Kilgore, Chuck Doherty, and Bob Griffin in the early 1960s. In 1962, 1290 KMEN (now Catholic station KKDD) began playing Top 40 hits and beat the former No. 1 KFXM in the ratings.

But in 1965, KFXM reclaimed the top spot with a DJ lineup of Don Elliot, Al Anthony, Jockey Jon (Jon Badeaux), Barry Boyd, and Gene Gleeson. An AFTRA strike in 1968 prompted KFXM to hire a new lineup of DJs, collectively known as the "Jones Boys" (as all of their on-air names had the surname Jones, hiding their real identities from the union), which kept the station running. Once the dispute was resolved, the DJs chose new on-air names.

Maintaining the leadership role in the Inland Empire into the 1970s were disc jockeys Jhani Kaye, Doug Collins, Don McCoy, Bruce Chandler, Chris Roberts, and Bob B. Blue. In the 80s, the station continued to succeed with Craig Powers, and then Rich Watson as PD and air personalities, Dave Murphy, Ed Mann, Jason McQueen (Michael Anglado), and Terry Shea, all of whom landed gigs at Los Angeles metro stations after their stints at KFXM.

=== Shift to Adult Standards and Talk ===
By the mid 1980s, most listening to Top 40 music shifted to FM radio. KFXM moved to an adult standards sound, playing the hits of Frank Sinatra, Dean Martin, Ella Fitzgerald and Bing Crosby. KFXM began airing syndicated talk shows from the NBC Talknet radio network at night. National news was supplied by the ABC Entertainment Network.

In the early 1990s, the station's call sign switched to KRSO. In 1992, upon final sign-off of the beautiful music format on 97.5 FM KDUO in Riverside (now KLYY), the station referred listeners to KRSO as a similar format to what they had heard on KDUO. However, it was only a short time later that KRSO flipped to an all-talk format, using NBC Radio News and continuing to air NBC's Talknet programming at night.

In 1996, the station was acquired by EXCL Communications, which switched to a Spanish-language Religious format, using the call letters KSZZ.

=== Salem Communications ===
KTIE ident used before the rebranding to "The Answer"

In 2001, Salem Communications bought the station for $7 million, returning the format to talk and changing the call sign to KRLH. The station began carrying the line up of Salem Radio Network talk shows. Two years later, the call letters switched again, this time to KTIE for Talk of the Inland Empire.

On April 23, 2012, KTIE was re-branded to AM 590 The Answer. Most Salem Communications talk stations now call themselves "The Answer".

== Programming ==
KTIE simulcasts Jennifer Horn and Grant Stinchfield's morning show from KRLA in Los Angeles; the remainder of the schedule is syndicated, largely from the Salem Radio Network. KTIE carries Los Angeles Rams games during the NFL season.
