= Carey Davis =

American football player (born 1981)

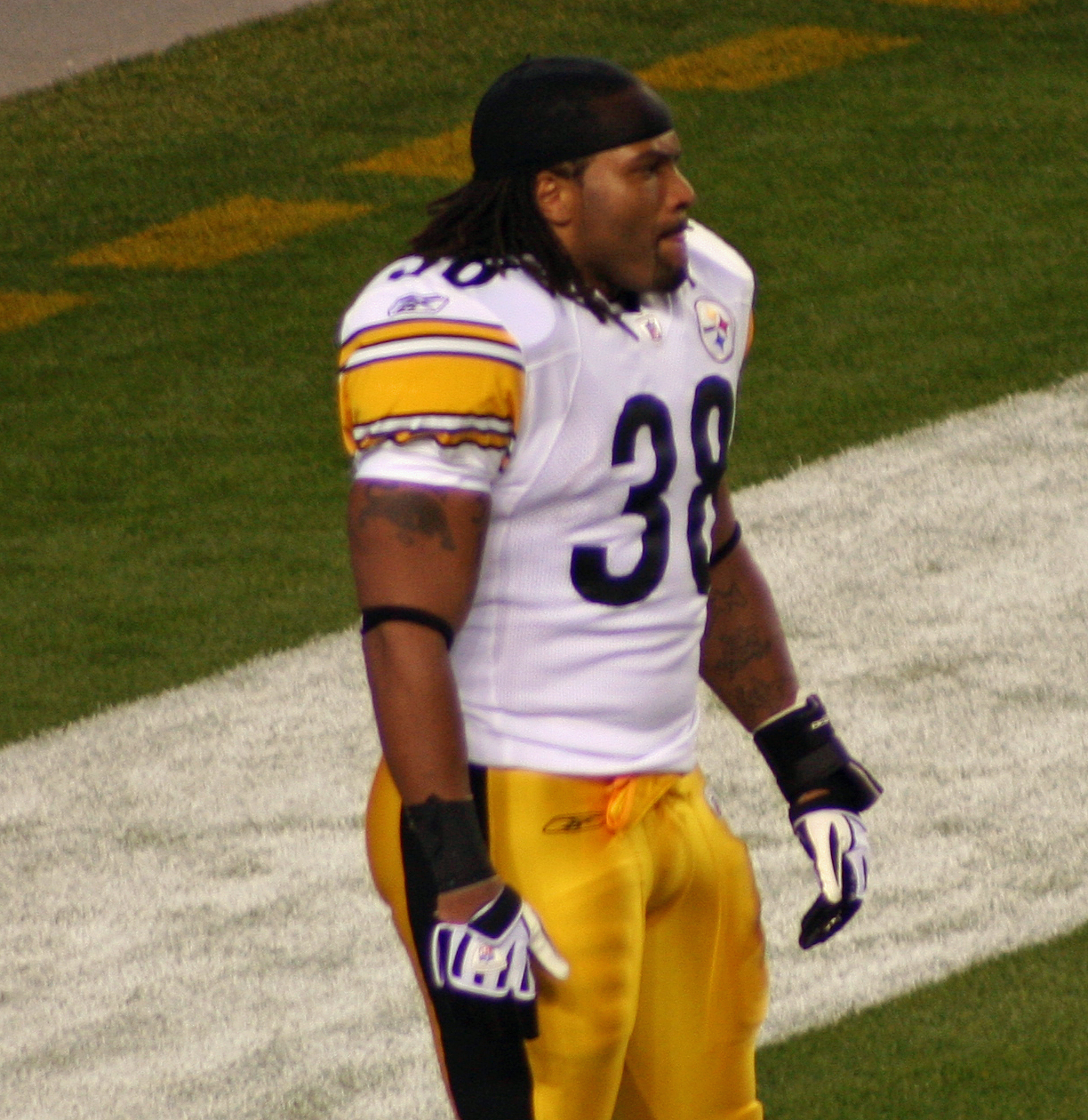
- Davis with the Pittsburgh Steelers in 2009

No. 39, 45, 38
- Position: Fullback

Personal information
- Born: March 27, 1981 (age 45); St. Louis, Missouri, U.S.
- Listed height: 5 ft 10 in (1.78 m)
- Listed weight: 225 lb (102 kg)

Career information
- High school: Hazelwood Central (St. Louis)
- College: Illinois (1999–2003)
- NFL draft: 2004: undrafted

Career history
- Indianapolis Colts (2004); Atlanta Falcons (2004)*; Tampa Bay Buccaneers (2005–2006)*; Miami Dolphins (2006)*; Pittsburgh Steelers (2006–2009); Washington Redskins (2010)*
- * Offseason or practice squad member only

Awards and highlights
- Super Bowl champion (XLIII)

Career NFL statistics
- Rushing attempts: 31
- Rushing yards: 118
- Receptions: 17
- Receiving yards: 76
- Stats at Pro Football Reference

Carey Alexander Davis (born March 27, 1981) is an American sportscaster and former professional football player. He played as a fullback in the National Football League (NFL). Davis played college football for the Illinois Fighting Illini and was signed by the Indianapolis Colts as an undrafted free agent in 2004. He was also a member of the Atlanta Falcons, Tampa Bay Buccaneers, Miami Dolphins, Pittsburgh Steelers, and Washington Redskins. He won a championship with the Steelers in Super Bowl XLIII.

== College career ==
Davis played college football at the University of Illinois where he played in 42 games having success in both receiving and running duties. He finished his career with 114 receptions for 751 yards and five touchdowns and running the ball he added 216 carries for 1,012 yards and one touchdown. He graduated in May 2003 with a degree in Leisure Studies/Sports Management.

== Professional career ==
=== Indianapolis Colts ===
Davis was originally signed by the Indianapolis Colts as a rookie free agent on April 30, 2004, and spent a brief period on the active roster. He then was added to the roster of various teams, including the Atlanta Falcons, Tampa Bay Buccaneers, and Miami Dolphins, but received no playing time.

=== Pittsburgh Steelers ===
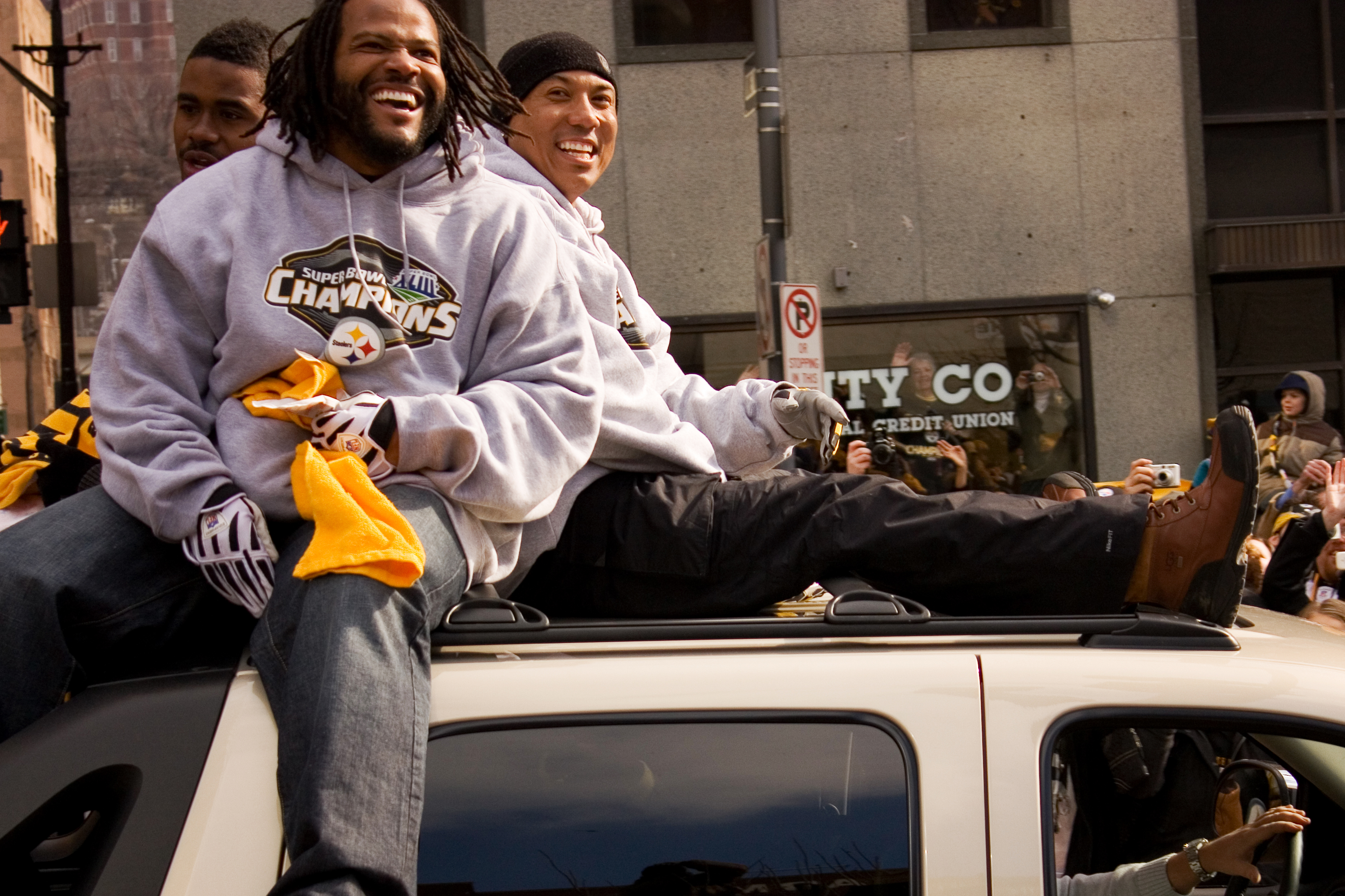
Davis (center holding Terrible Towel) in Super Bowl XLIII victory parade with teammates Nate Washington (left) and Hines Ward (right).

Davis signed a contract with the Pittsburgh Steelers on January 3, 2007. It was announced on September 7, 2007, that Davis would be the 2007 Opening Day starting fullback, beating out incumbent starter Dan Kreider. Kreider and Davis shared the starting position through the season until the Monday Night Football game against the Miami Dolphins, when Kreider tore his ACL. From that game forward, Davis was the starting fullback. When halfback Willie Parker went down with an injury in Week 16, Davis shared some snaps at halfback with Najeh Davenport. He finished the season having played in 16 games and rushing 17 times for 68 yards. In 2007, he led the team in special team tackles with 17.

During the 2008 season, his production declined as the Steelers offense became more pass-oriented. In the midseason, he was replaced as starting fullback by Sean McHugh.

He was released on September 4, 2009, and then re-signed on September 29.

=== Washington Redskins ===
Davis was signed by the Redskins on August 22, 2010 to replace the injured Mike Sellers, but was later released on September 4, 2010.

== Broadcasting career ==
Davis is the sideline reporter for Illinois Fighting Illini football broadcasts. He is also a frequent guest host on 101 ESPN Radio in his native St. Louis. On September 2, 2022, it was announced he would take over permanent co-hosting duties at 101 ESPN with co-host Randy Karraker on the station's morning drive show called The Opening Drive. Beginning in 2024 he moved on from The Opening Drive to take over co-hosting duties on another 101 ESPN show, The Fast Lane with co-hosts Anthony Stalter and former NHL defenseman Jamie Rivers.

== Coaching ==
He has been the head football coach at Hazelwood Central High School since 2018.
