= 2006 World Series =

102nd edition of Major League Baseball's championship series

| Team (Wins) | Managers | Season |
|---|---|---|
| St. Louis Cardinals (4) | Tony La Russa | 83–78 (.516), GA: 1 1/2 |
| Detroit Tigers (1) | Jim Leyland | 95–67 (.586), GB: 1 |
- Dates: October 21–27
- Venue(s): Comerica Park (Detroit); Busch Stadium (St. Louis)
- MVP: David Eckstein (St. Louis)
- Umpires: Randy Marsh (crew chief), Alfonso Márquez, Wally Bell, Mike Winters, John Hirschbeck, Tim McClelland
- Hall of Famers: Cardinals: Tony La Russa (manager); Scott Rolen; Tigers: Jim Leyland (manager); Iván Rodríguez

Broadcast
- Television: Fox (United States); MLB International (International)
- TV announcers: Joe Buck and Tim McCarver (Fox); Dave O'Brien and Rick Sutcliffe (MLB International)
- Radio: ESPN; KTRS (STL); WXYT (DET)
- Radio announcers: Jon Miller and Joe Morgan (ESPN); Mike Shannon and John Rooney (KMOX); Dan Dickerson, Ernie Harwell (Game 1), and Jim Price (WXYT)
- ALCS: Detroit Tigers over Oakland Athletics (4–0)
- NLCS: St. Louis Cardinals over New York Mets (4–3)

The 2006 World Series was the championship series of Major League Baseball's (MLB) 2006 season. The 102nd edition of the World Series, it was a best-of-seven playoff between the American League (AL) champion Detroit Tigers and the National League (NL) champion St. Louis Cardinals; the Cardinals won the series in five games to win their tenth World Series championship, becoming the first National League team to win ten or more championships and the second in MLB overall, joining the New York Yankees. This was the third World Series matchup between the Tigers and Cardinals, the first in 38 years. The Cardinals won the first in 1934, and the Tigers won the second in 1968; each went the full seven games.

It was only the fifth time in 40 years that the Series featured two teams that had both remained in the same city since the formation of the AL in 1901, the last time being the 2004 World Series between St. Louis and the Boston Red Sox. The last three prior to 2004 were in 1975 (Boston–Cincinnati), 1968 (Detroit–St. Louis) and 1967 (Boston–St. Louis).

The Cardinals, who moved into Busch Stadium III in April, became the fourth team to win the Series in their home stadium's debut season, joining the 1909 Pittsburgh Pirates (Forbes Field), 1912 Boston Red Sox (Fenway Park) and 1923 New York Yankees (Yankee Stadium I). In 2009, they would be joined by the 2009 New York Yankees (Yankee Stadium II). With this win, the Cardinals would join the Yankees on becoming only the second team in MLB history to win 10 World Series Championships. It also marked the franchise's first championship since 1982. Cardinals manager Tony La Russa, who won the 1989 World Series title with the Athletics, became the second manager in history to lead teams in both leagues to championships, joining Sparky Anderson. Tigers manager Jim Leyland, who won the 1997 World Series title with the Marlins, also could have become the second manager in history to lead teams in both leagues to championships, had the Tigers won the series.

The Cardinals finished the regular season 83–78, which was the second-worst record ever for a league champion (the 1973 New York Mets finished 82–79) and the worst record ever for a World Series champion. Previously, the 1987 Minnesota Twins finished 85–77 and defeated that year's Cardinals team in the 1987 World Series.

This World Series would be the last time until 2023 in which both teams failed to make the next season's playoffs.

== Background ==
=== A pair of battered ballclubs ===
Since Interleague Play began in 1997, this marked the third time a World Series would be a rematch of the regular season. The Tigers swept the Cardinals in three games at Comerica Park from June 23–25.

Neither team was given much chance to advance far into October by many baseball pundits. Both teams stumbled through the second halves of their seasons. The Tigers, only three years removed from having the most losses in a season by an AL team and enjoying their first successful season after 12 years of futility, surprised the baseball world by building a ten-game lead in the American League Central, but eventually the lead evaporated in the final months and they lost the division to the Minnesota Twins on the last day of the season after being swept by the last-place Kansas City Royals at home, settling for a playoff berth as the AL Wild Card. The Cardinals held a seven-game advantage in the National League Central over the Cincinnati Reds and an 8 1/2-game lead over the Houston Astros with just two weeks to play. However, the combination of a seven-game losing streak by St. Louis and an eight-game winning streak by the Astros (highlighted by a four-game sweep of the Cardinals in Houston) caused the Cardinals' lead to shrink to half a game with only a few games left. However, the Cardinals held on to clinch the division after an Astros' loss to the Atlanta Braves on the last day of the season.

Thus, both the Tigers and Cardinals were clear underdogs in their matches, against the New York Yankees and San Diego Padres, respectively. The Tigers' pitching took care of the vaunted Yankees lineup, and won their series 3–1. The Cardinals also won their series 3–1, including the first two games in San Diego. The Tigers then swept the Oakland Athletics in the ALCS, winning game four on a three-run walk-off home run by Magglio Ordóñez in the bottom of the ninth. The Cardinals won their series against the New York Mets with the help of a ninth-inning home run by Yadier Molina in a tense Game 7.

The Tigers had home-field advantage in the Series, due to the AL's 3–2 win over the NL in the All-Star Game on July 11 at PNC Park in Pittsburgh. These two teams had already played against each other in a three-game series in June 2006, where the Tigers swept the Cardinals 3–0 in Detroit, part of an eight-game Cardinals losing streak. This was the first time since 2000 that teams meeting during the regular season met again in the World Series.

The Series marked the third time in a row that both teams sought to win a championship after at least a 20-year drought. In 2004, the Boston Red Sox ended their 86-year hiatus by defeating the Cardinals; in 2005 the Chicago White Sox ended an 88-year drought by defeating the Houston Astros, who were competing in their first World Series after 43 seasons. The Tigers had not appeared in the World Series since winning it in 1984. The Cardinals last won in 1982, losing three times since then, in 1985, 1987, and 2004.

The Tigers were the eighth wild card team to compete in the World Series since MLB introduced the wild card in 1994. A wild-card team participated in the Series from 2002 to 2007.

Riding the momentum they built up during their surprisingly easy ALDS and ALCS victories, Detroit entered the Series as a prohibitive favorite. Bob Nightengale of USA Today expressed popular sentiment when he wrote "Tigers in three".

=== Two veteran managers return to postseason play ===
St. Louis' manager Tony La Russa joined his mentor, Sparky Anderson, as only the second manager to win the World Series with teams in both leagues. La Russa won in 1989 with the Athletics. Coincidentally, Anderson first accomplished the feat by managing Detroit to their previous championship in 1984. He was chosen to throw out the ceremonial first pitch before Game 2. If the Tigers had defeated the Cardinals, Jim Leyland would have joined Anderson for this feat instead of LaRussa as he had already won the 1997 World Series with the Florida Marlins. When he came to St. Louis, La Russa wore number 10 to symbolize the team's drive to their 10th championship and pay tribute to Anderson, who wore number 10 while manager of the Cincinnati Reds. After winning the championship, he chose to continue wearing number 10 to pay tribute to Anderson.

Jim Leyland is the seventh manager to win pennants in both leagues. The previous six are Joe McCarthy (1929 Cubs and the Yankees of 1932, 1936–39 and 1941–43), Yogi Berra (1964 Yankees, 1973 Mets), Alvin Dark (1962 Giants, 1974 A's), Sparky Anderson (1970, 1972, 1975–76 Reds, 1984 Tigers), Dick Williams (1967 Red Sox, 1972–73 A's, 1984 Padres), and Tony La Russa (1988–90 A's, 2004, 2006 Cardinals).

Additionally, the opposing managers are close friends. Leyland was La Russa's third base coach for the Chicago White Sox in the early 1980s. Leyland also served as a Pittsburgh-based advance scout for the Cardinals before he was hired by the Tigers.

This was the first World Series in 22 years to have two previous World Series-winning managers facing each other, but at the helms of new teams. As previously mentioned, Leyland previously won the 1997 World Series with the Florida Marlins, and La Russa won the 1989 World Series with the Oakland Athletics. Overall, it was the first World Series since 1999 to have two previous Series-winning managers facing each other.

== Summary ==
St. Louis won the series, 4–1.

| Game | Date | Score | Location | Time | Attendance |
|---|---|---|---|---|---|
| 1 | October 21 | St. Louis Cardinals – 7, Detroit Tigers – 2 | Comerica Park | 2:54 | 42,479 |
| 2 | October 22 | St. Louis Cardinals – 1, Detroit Tigers – 3 | Comerica Park | 2:55 | 42,533 |
| 3 | October 24 | Detroit Tigers – 0, St. Louis Cardinals – 5 | Busch Stadium (III) | 3:03 | 46,513 |
| 4 | October 26† | Detroit Tigers – 4, St. Louis Cardinals – 5 | Busch Stadium (III) | 3:35 | 46,470 |
| 5 | October 27† | Detroit Tigers – 2, St. Louis Cardinals – 4 | Busch Stadium (III) | 2:56 | 46,638 |

†: Game 4 was postponed due to rain on October 25, forcing Game 5 to be subsequently pushed back a day as well.

== Matchups ==
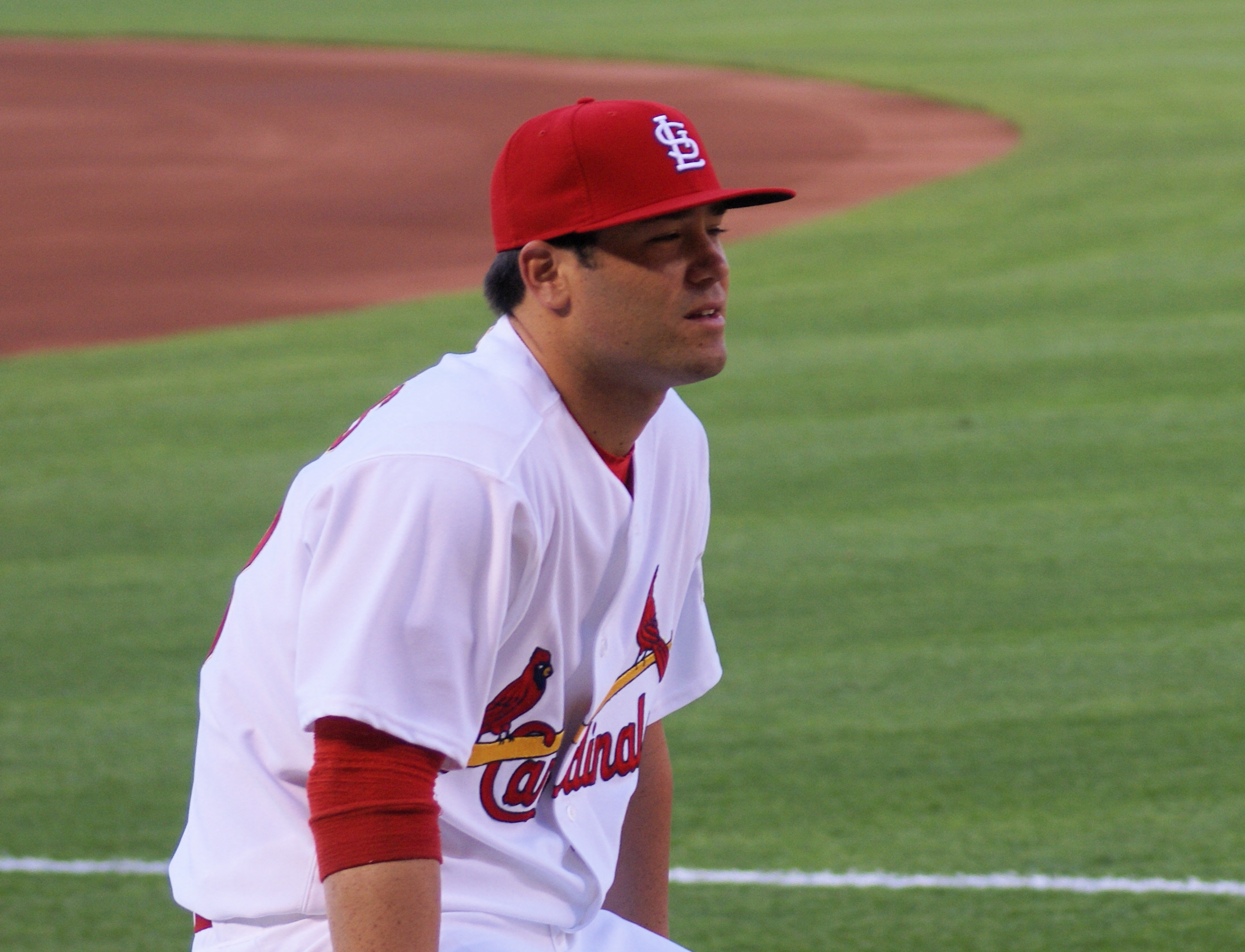
Pitcher Anthony Reyes started and won Game 1 for the Cardinals.

=== Game 1 ===
October 21, 2006 8:03 pm (EDT) at Comerica Park in Detroit, Michigan 56 °F (13 °C), cloudy
| Team | 1 | 2 | 3 | 4 | 5 | 6 | 7 | 8 | 9 | R | H | E |
|---|---|---|---|---|---|---|---|---|---|---|---|---|
| St. Louis | 0 | 1 | 3 | 0 | 0 | 3 | 0 | 0 | 0 | 7 | 8 | 2 |
| Detroit | 1 | 0 | 0 | 0 | 0 | 0 | 0 | 0 | 1 | 2 | 4 | 3 |
WP: Anthony Reyes (1–0) LP: Justin Verlander (0–1); Home runs: STL: Scott Rolen (1), Albert Pujols (1); DET: Craig Monroe (1); Attendance: 42,479; Boxscore

Two rookies faced off in Game 1 for the first time in history: Anthony Reyes for St. Louis and Justin Verlander for Detroit. It looked like the Tigers were going to get to Reyes early in the bottom of the first, when Craig Monroe doubled and Magglio Ordóñez walked. Carlos Guillén singled Monroe in, giving the Tigers a 1–0 lead. However, in the top of the second, Scott Rolen hit a long home run to left field, tying the score at 1–1. Rolen was 0-for-15 in his career in the World Series before hitting the home run. The previous mark had been 0-for-13, set by Benny Kauff of the New York Giants in the 1917 World Series. In the third inning, St. Louis broke through, first when Chris Duncan's RBI double scored Yadier Molina to give the Cardinals the lead. On Verlander's next pitch, 2005 National League MVP Albert Pujols hit a two-run home run, punishing the rookie who elected to pitch to the dangerous Pujols, rather than walk him with first base open and two outs and pitch to Jim Edmonds.

Meanwhile, Anthony Reyes pitched well. The pitcher who had the fewest regular season wins of a Game 1 World Series starter (5) at one point retired 17 in a row from the first inning to the sixth inning, a World Series record for a rookie. The previous record was thirteen (John Stuper, STL, 1982, and Dickey Kerr, CHW, 1919). Reyes' final line was eight-plus innings, four hits, two runs, and four strikeouts. The Cards took advantage of Detroit's mistakes again in the sixth. Pujols walked, and advanced to third when Verlander's attempted pickoff was thrown for an error and went into the right-field foul area. Jim Edmonds's single scored Pujols and a Scott Rolen ground rule double put runners on second and third and ended Verlander's night in favor of reliever Jason Grilli. Detroit made more mistakes when Brandon Inge made two errors in one play. Grilli induced Juan Encarnacion to ground to third. Inge threw to home wild, which allowed Edmonds to score, and then obstructed Scott Rolen, who was attempting to run home on the wild throw, to score another run and allow Encarnacion to reach second. Craig Monroe hit a home run off Reyes in the bottom of the ninth, which led to Reyes being pulled from the game, as Braden Looper came in to finish the game. The final score was 7–2 Cardinals, marking the first time since 2003 that the National League had won a World Series game, and the first World Series game won by St. Louis since Game 5 of the 1987 World Series.

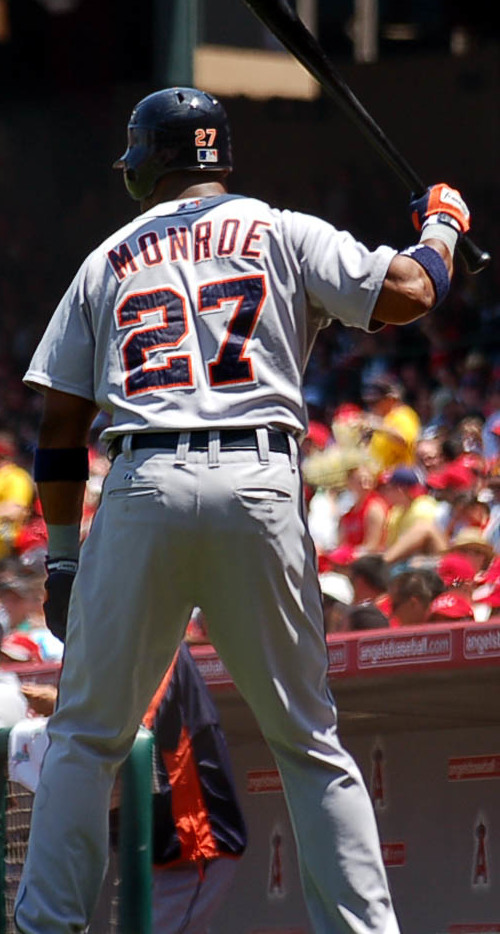
Craig Monroe hit a home run for the second consecutive game in the series.

=== Game 2 ===
October 22, 2006 8:23 pm (EDT) at Comerica Park in Detroit, Michigan 44 °F (7 °C), rain
| Team | 1 | 2 | 3 | 4 | 5 | 6 | 7 | 8 | 9 | R | H | E |
|---|---|---|---|---|---|---|---|---|---|---|---|---|
| St. Louis | 0 | 0 | 0 | 0 | 0 | 0 | 0 | 0 | 1 | 1 | 4 | 1 |
| Detroit | 2 | 0 | 0 | 0 | 1 | 0 | 0 | 0 | X | 3 | 10 | 1 |
WP: Kenny Rogers (1–0) LP: Jeff Weaver (0–1) Sv: Todd Jones (1); Home runs: STL: None; DET: Craig Monroe (2); Attendance: 42,533; Boxscore

Before the game's start, John Mellencamp and Little Big Town performed "Our Country". With a starting temperature of 44 °F (7 °C), controversy surrounded the start of Game 2 when Tigers starting pitcher Kenny Rogers was found to have a substance on a patch of the palm of his pitching hand during the first inning. Although Cardinals hitters claimed that the ball was doing "weird things" in the first inning, Cardinals manager Tony La Russa did not request an inspection of Rogers' hand to determine what the substance was. Rogers claimed it was a combination of dirt and rosin (both legal), but complied with a request from the umpires to wash his hands before the second inning.

Unfazed, Rogers would go on to pitch eight shutout innings while surrendering only two hits, running his postseason streak to 23 straight shutout innings. Craig Monroe hit his second home run in the series, and Carlos Guillén, who was a home run away from the cycle, and Sean Casey each drove in runs to give the Tigers a 3–0 lead going into the ninth. Todd Jones then came into the game to close it out but got into a heavy jam (he had an error which contributed to the jam), with Scott Rolen being driven in by Jim Edmonds before a force-out at second with the bases loaded won the game for the Tigers. Craig Monroe became the fifth player to hit a home run in each of his first two World Series games. The others were Barry Bonds for the Giants in 2002, Ted Simmons for the Brewers in 1982, Dusty Rhodes for the New York Giants in 1954, and Jimmie Foxx for the Philadelphia Athletics in 1929. St. Louis pitcher Jeff Weaver (the same pitcher who as a Yankee had surrendered the walk-off home run in game 4 of the 2003 World Series) surrendered all three Detroit runs in his five innings of work and took the loss for the Cardinals.

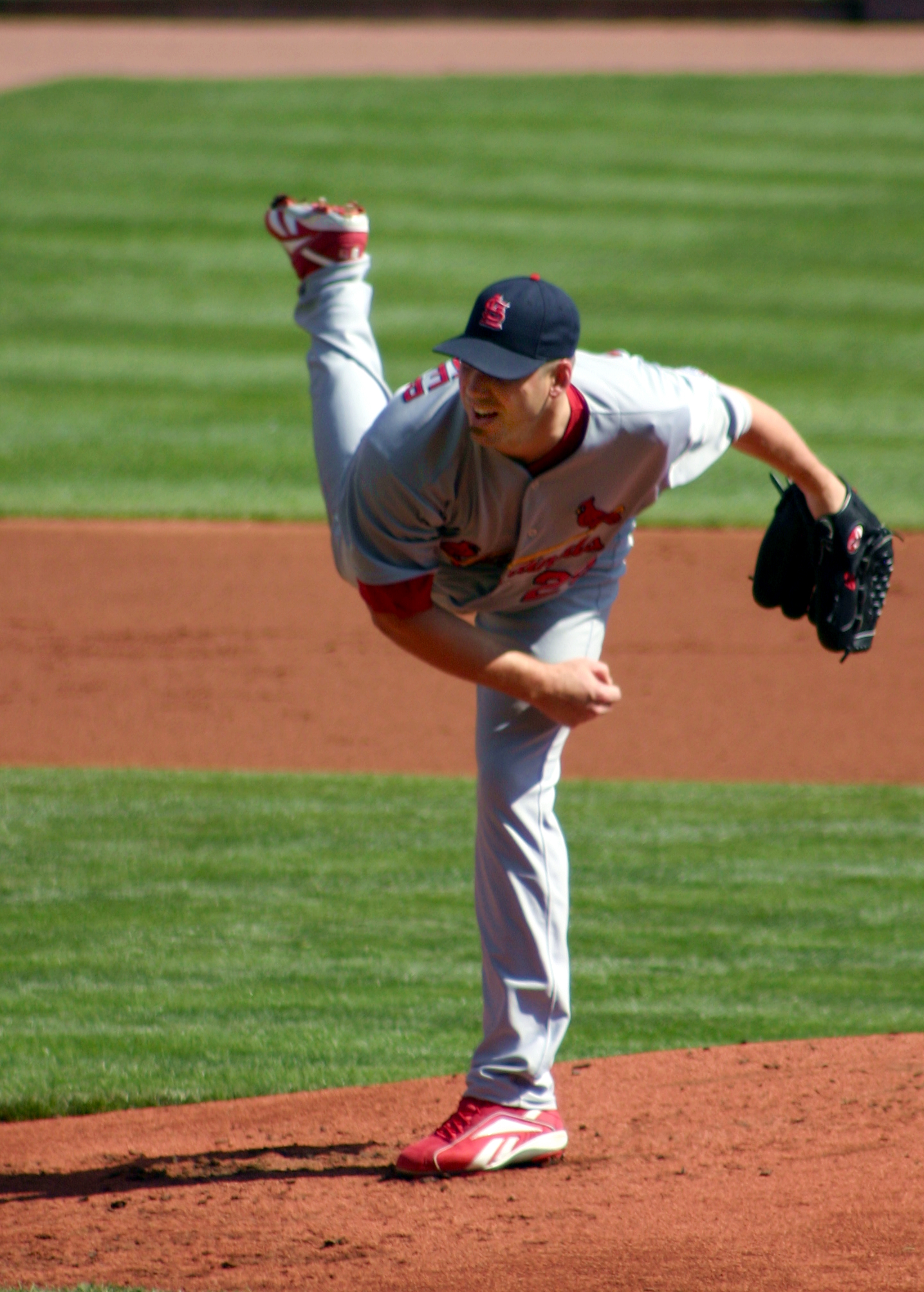
Chris Carpenter, the winning pitcher in Game 3.

=== Game 3 ===
October 24, 2006 7:33 pm (CDT) at Busch Stadium in St. Louis, Missouri 43 °F (6 °C), clear
| Team | 1 | 2 | 3 | 4 | 5 | 6 | 7 | 8 | 9 | R | H | E |
|---|---|---|---|---|---|---|---|---|---|---|---|---|
| Detroit | 0 | 0 | 0 | 0 | 0 | 0 | 0 | 0 | 0 | 0 | 3 | 1 |
| St. Louis | 0 | 0 | 0 | 2 | 0 | 0 | 2 | 1 | X | 5 | 7 | 0 |
WP: Chris Carpenter (1–0) LP: Nate Robertson (0–1); Attendance: 46,513; Boxscore

After the Cardinals were shut out by Detroit pitcher Kenny Rogers for eight innings in Game 2, St. Louis starter Chris Carpenter answered with eight innings of his own in a 5–0 Cardinals victory in Game 3. Carpenter, making his World Series debut (he missed the entire 2004 World Series due to injury) gave up only three hits, struck out six and did not issue a walk, while throwing only 82 pitches. Only one Tiger reached second base.

St. Louis began the scoring in the fourth inning on a bases-loaded two-run double by center fielder Jim Edmonds off of Nate Robertson. Two more runs would score in the bottom of the seventh, when Detroit reliever Joel Zumaya walked Eckstein and Preston Wilson. He got Albert Pujols to ground a ball back to him, but Zumaya overthrew third baseman Brandon Inge on what should have been a routine force out, which allowed both Eckstein and Wilson to score. St. Louis would add another run in the eighth, with Fernando Rodney walking So Taguchi, allowing a single to Eckstein, and throwing a wild pitch to score Taguchi.

Reliever Braden Looper would pitch a perfect ninth to close out the game and give St. Louis a two-games-to-one advantage in the Series.

The Cardinals became the first team since the Cincinnati Reds in 1970 to host a World Series game in their first season in a new ballpark.

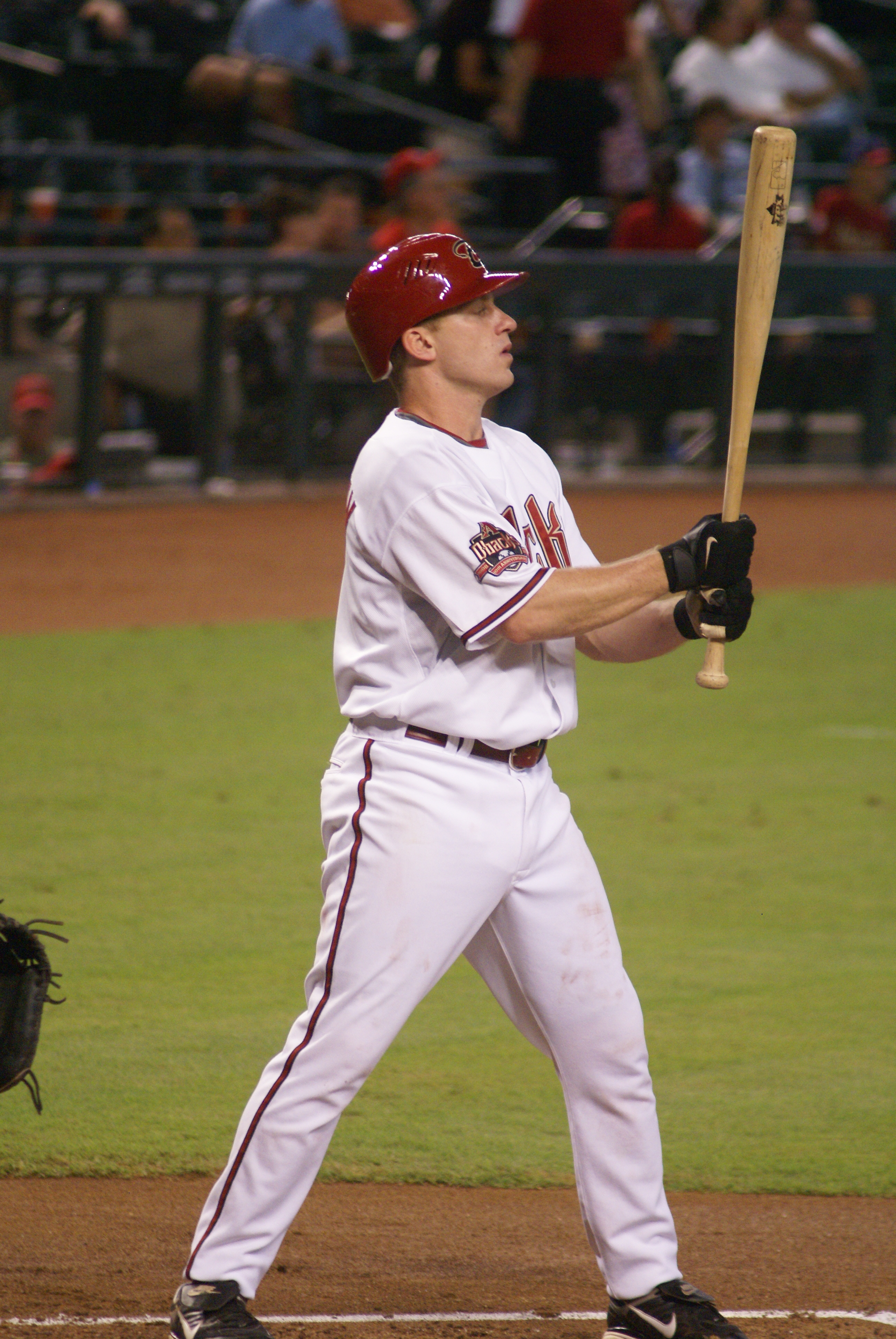
David Eckstein's RBI in the eighth inning provided the winning margin for the Cardinals.

=== Game 4 ===
October 26, 2006 7:27 pm (CDT) at Busch Stadium in St. Louis, Missouri 53 °F (12 °C), chance of rain
| Team | 1 | 2 | 3 | 4 | 5 | 6 | 7 | 8 | 9 | R | H | E |
|---|---|---|---|---|---|---|---|---|---|---|---|---|
| Detroit | 0 | 1 | 2 | 0 | 0 | 0 | 0 | 1 | 0 | 4 | 10 | 1 |
| St. Louis | 0 | 0 | 1 | 1 | 0 | 0 | 2 | 1 | X | 5 | 9 | 0 |
WP: Adam Wainwright (1–0) LP: Joel Zumaya (0–1); Home runs: DET: Sean Casey (1); STL: None; Attendance: 46,470; Boxscore

Game 4 was pushed back a day because of rain, the first time a rainout had occurred in the World Series since Game 1 in 1996. The fans from the game were to attend Game 5. (Thus, fans who had tickets for Game 5 went to Game 4 instead.) The Cardinals won, taking a 3–1 series lead. The starters were Jeff Suppan for the Cardinals and Jeremy Bonderman for the Tigers. The Tigers took a 3–0 lead into the top of the third, after Sean Casey had two RBIs, including a home run. The other RBI came from Detroit's Iván Rodríguez, who singled in Carlos Guillén. Rodriguez, who had been hitless in the previous three games, also went 3-for-4.

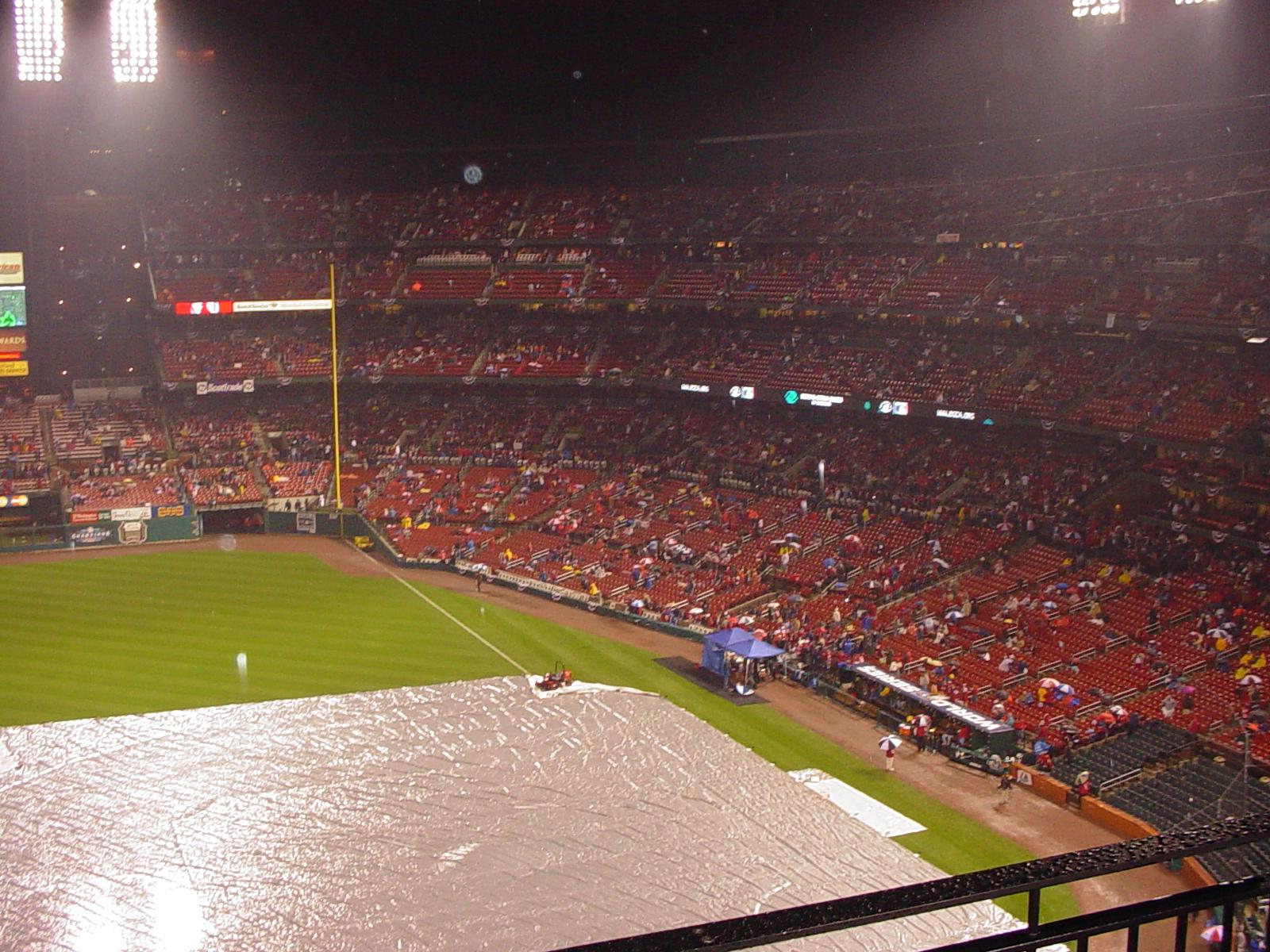
Rainout of Game 4, October 25.

After allowing those three early runs, the Cardinals' Suppan did not allow any more runs in six innings.

In the bottom of the third, the Cardinals struck back with a run-scoring double by David Eckstein, scoring Aaron Miles who had the first stolen base of the series by either team. Yadier Molina doubled in Scott Rolen in the fourth to cut the Tiger lead to 3–2. The score remained that way until the bottom of the seventh, when Eckstein led off with a double over the head of Curtis Granderson, who had slipped on the wet Busch Stadium outfield grass. Had Granderson not slipped, this likely would have been an out. Eckstein then scored on an attempted sacrifice bunt by So Taguchi that was thrown over the head of second baseman Plácido Polanco, who was covering first by Fernando Rodney, and that tied the score at three, allowed Taguchi to get to second, and cost Rodney a blown save. Rodney then intentionally walked Albert Pujols and got two outs, but then allowed Preston Wilson to hit a single to left with two outs that scored Taguchi from third and gave the Cardinals the lead. The Tigers tied the game in the top of the eighth when Ivan Rodriguez doubled, advanced to third on a sacrifice bunt, and scored on a Brandon Inge double. Adam Wainwright, the winning pitcher, was charged with a blown save, but escaped the inning with two strikeouts. The Cardinals then scored the winning run in the bottom of the inning. Detroit reliever Joel Zumaya walked Yadier Molina, then got Miles to hit into a force play with Molina out at second. Zumaya struck out Juan Encarnacion, but his strike three went wild and allowed Miles to advance to second. Miles then scored on another double by Eckstein just off the glove of outfielder Craig Monroe, who had been playing shallow and dove for a ball just out of his reach. Wainwright then pitched a scoreless ninth to end the game.

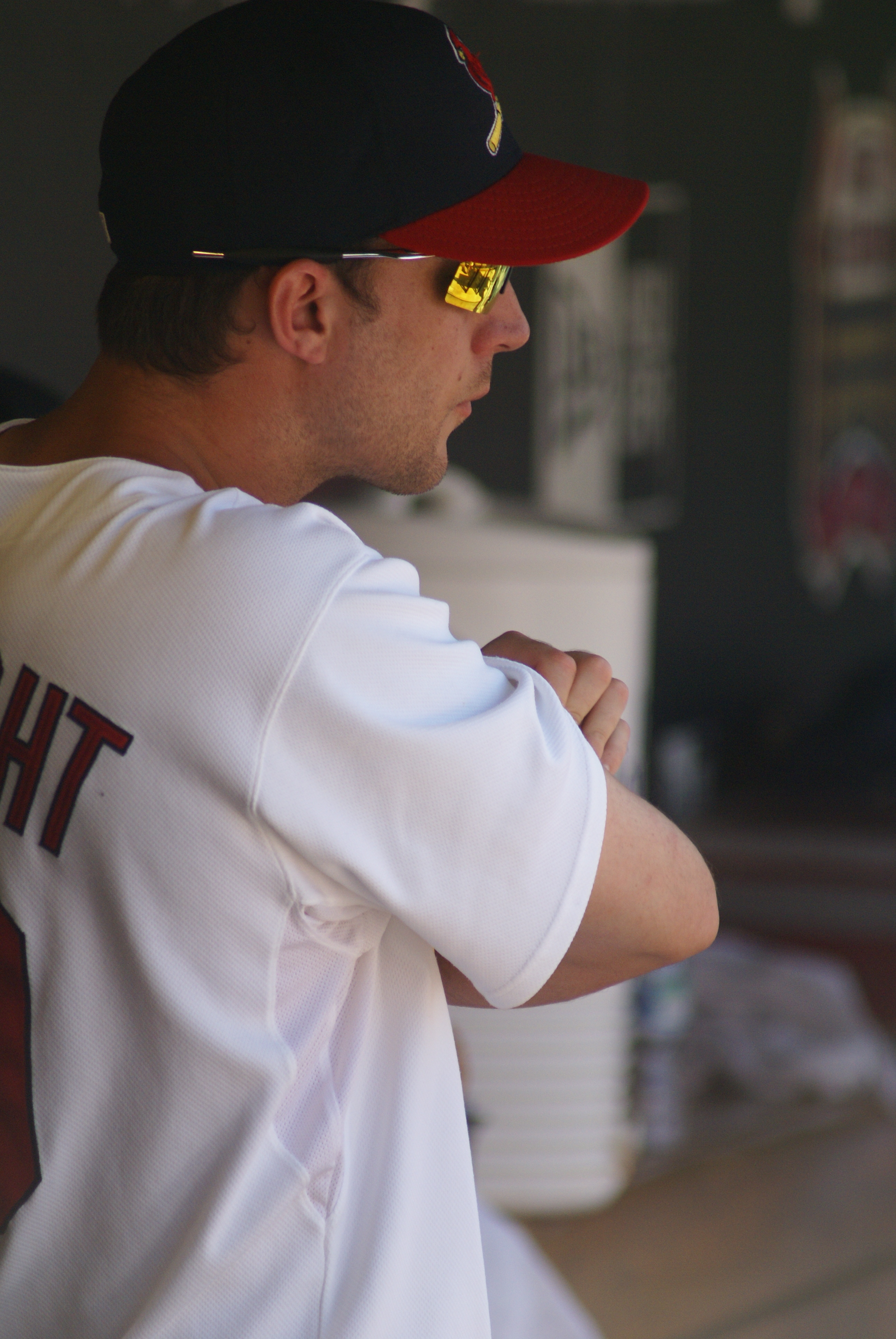
Adam Wainwright pitched a scoreless ninth inning in relief to clinch the World Series for the Cardinals.

=== Game 5 ===
October 27, 2006 7:27 pm (CDT) at Busch Stadium in St. Louis, Missouri 46 °F (8 °C), partly cloudy
| Team | 1 | 2 | 3 | 4 | 5 | 6 | 7 | 8 | 9 | R | H | E |
|---|---|---|---|---|---|---|---|---|---|---|---|---|
| Detroit | 0 | 0 | 0 | 2 | 0 | 0 | 0 | 0 | 0 | 2 | 5 | 2 |
| St. Louis | 0 | 1 | 0 | 2 | 0 | 0 | 1 | 0 | X | 4 | 8 | 1 |
WP: Jeff Weaver (1–1) LP: Justin Verlander (0–2) Sv: Adam Wainwright (1); Home runs: DET: Sean Casey (2); STL: None; Attendance: 46,638; Boxscore

On a day in which it rained much of the day but stopped early enough so that the lack of a dome did not delay the game, the Cardinals won to clinch the championship four games to one, making this the first five-game series since the Yankees–Mets Series in 2000. The starter for Detroit was game 1 loser Justin Verlander and the Cardinals starter was game 2 loser Jeff Weaver. Weaver got an extra day of rest to avoid pitching on three days rest.

Justin Verlander pitched a sloppy first inning for Detroit, walking three and tying a World Series record for a single inning by throwing two wild pitches. He avoided allowing any runs, however, thanks to a good play by shortstop Carlos Guillén to get the third out on what was almost an infield hit.

The Cardinals took the lead in the second inning on a lead-off single by Yadier Molina followed by two advancing groundouts, and then an infield single by David Eckstein. Detroit third baseman Brandon Inge made a good play to stop the ball off Eckstein's bat, but then made a poor throw to first which got by first baseman Sean Casey and allowed Eckstein to advance to second. The throwing error was the seventh error of the series by the Tigers, also giving them at least one error in every game to that point. However, Verlander bucked down and struck out Chris Duncan to get out of the inning.

Cardinals pitcher Jeff Weaver (an ex-Tiger) was cruising into the fourth inning, and he appeared to be nowhere near trouble with a lead-off groundout by Guillen, followed by a routine popup by Magglio Ordóñez. This popup turned out to be much more troublesome than it first appeared: right fielder Chris Duncan dropped the ball, apparently distracted by center fielder Jim Edmonds who was also going after the ball. With Ordóñez on second via the error, the very next pitch of the game was hit by the hot-hitting Sean Casey into the right-field seats just inside the foul pole for a two-run homer that gave Detroit the lead, 2–1. The Cardinals would threaten immediately in the bottom of the inning, however, with Yadier Molina and So Taguchi each singling to put runners at first and second with one out. Pitcher Jeff Weaver then came up and attempted to bunt the runners over to second and third. The bunt was fielded cleanly by the pitcher Justin Verlander, but he attempted to force out Molina at third. The throw missed third baseman Brandon Inge and the ball went into the left-field foul area. This allowed Molina to score to tie it up, with Taguchi and Weaver arriving safely at third and second. Later, Verlander said "I picked it up and said, Don't throw it away, instead of just throwing it. I got tentative." The throwing error by Verlander was the fifth error by Detroit pitchers in the World Series, having committed one per game, setting a new World Series record. (A placard held by a Cardinals fan in the stands read "HIT IT TO THE PITCHER"). The next batter, David Eckstein, grounded out to score the runner from third, and St. Louis secured their lead, 3–2. Verlander kept Weaver from scoring by retiring Chris Duncan, but the damage was already done.

Chris Duncan misplayed another ball in the top of the sixth for a Sean Casey two-out double, but this time Casey would be stranded as Iván Rodríguez then struck out to end the inning. A David Eckstein single followed by a Preston Wilson walk in the bottom of the seventh put runners at first and second with none out for the heart of the Cardinals order: Pujols, Edmonds, and Rolen. Pujols popped out and Edmonds flied out, so it appeared Detroit might hold the Cardinals to a one-run lead. Instead, Scott Rolen singled and scored Eckstein, doubling the Cardinals lead to 4–2. Fernando Rodney, who gave up the single to Rolen and was charged with the run, managed to retire Ronnie Belliard to end the inning.

Jeff Weaver retired the side in order, and the Cardinals went to the ninth, three outs away from their first World Series title in 24 years. The man called on to get those three outs would be Adam Wainwright, who had won the job of closer after the star free agent brought to St. Louis in 2002, Jason Isringhausen, had season-ending surgery. Detroit's clean-up hitter, Magglio Ordóñez, led off the inning. He proceeded to work a full count but then grounded out. The second batter, Sean Casey, worked a full count and then kept his clutch hitting going by doubling to bring the tying run to the plate. The third batter, Iván Rodríguez, got ahead in the count 2–0 but grounded back to Wainwright on the next pitch, putting the Cardinals one out away while Casey advanced to third. The fourth batter, Plácido Polanco (who was hitless during the entire series), fell behind 1–2, but then worked a walk to put the tying run on and put runners on the corners. The fifth batter, Brandon Inge, fell behind 0–2, again putting the Cardinals one strike from a World Series championship. He did not extend the drama any longer, as he swung and missed at the next pitch (making it the first World Series to end on a strikeout since the 1988 World Series), giving the World Series title to the Cardinals. The final play of the 2006 season was made at 10:26pm Central Standard time. After the game, Wainwright, who threw a curveball for strike three to win the pennant and a slider to Inge to win the Series, said "I'll probably never throw another curve or slider again without thinking of those two pitches."

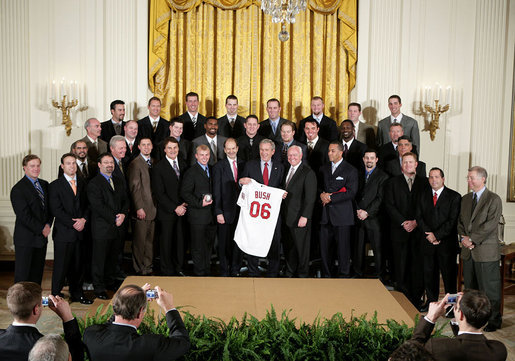
The Cardinals are honored as champions of the World Series by President George W. Bush at the White House on January 15, 2007.

== Composite line score ==
2006 World Series (4–1): St. Louis Cardinals (N.L.) over Detroit Tigers (A.L.)

| Team | 1 | 2 | 3 | 4 | 5 | 6 | 7 | 8 | 9 | R | H | E |
|---|---|---|---|---|---|---|---|---|---|---|---|---|
| St. Louis Cardinals | 0 | 2 | 4 | 5 | 0 | 3 | 5 | 2 | 1 | 22 | 36 | 4 |
| Detroit Tigers | 3 | 1 | 2 | 2 | 1 | 0 | 0 | 1 | 1 | 11 | 32 | 8 |
Total attendance: 224,633 Average attendance: 44,927; Winning player's share: $362,173 Losing player's share: $291,668

== Statistical notes and records ==
- The Cardinals' 83–78 record was the worst by any World Series champion in MLB history.
- Detroit pitchers committed five errors during the Series, setting a World Series record for most errors by a pitching staff in a single Fall Classic.
- Game 1 marked the first time in World Series history that both starting pitchers were rookies (Anthony Reyes and Justin Verlander).
- Reyes retired 17 consecutive batters in Game 1, establishing a World Series record for a rookie pitcher.
- The 2006 Series was the last until 2023 in which both participants failed to qualify for the postseason the following year.

== Broadcasting ==
The World Series was televised in the United States by Fox, with play-by-play announcer Joe Buck (who was the Cardinals' local television announcer during the regular season) and former Cardinals catcher Tim McCarver as the color analyst. The starting time for each television broadcast was 8:00 pm EDT/7:00 pm CDT.

On radio, the series was broadcast nationally by ESPN Radio, with Jon Miller and Joe Morgan announcing. Locally, Dan Dickerson and Jim Price called the Series for the Tigers on WXYT-AM in Detroit (with retired longtime Tiger announcer Ernie Harwell returning to call the second inning of Game 1), while Mike Shannon and John Rooney called it for the Cardinals on KTRS-AM in St. Louis. Per contractual obligation, the non-flagship stations on the teams' radio networks carried the ESPN Radio broadcasts.

Rooney had broadcast the 2005 World Series for the Chicago White Sox, and thus became the first announcer to call back-to-back World Series championships as an employee of different teams.

== Ratings ==
The ratings for the 2006 World Series were considered concerning at the time. The ratings for Games 1, 3, and 4 were the lowest rated Games 1, 3, and 4 in series history. Game 1, at 8.0, set the record for the lowest rated World Series game of all time (the 9.4 rating in Game 1 of the 2002 World Series was the prior lowest). The series overall averaged 10.1, sinking below the 11.1 of the 2005 World Series to become the lowest-rated World Series of all time.

However, those numbers look differently today, considering the performances of many of the World Series following 2006. Subsequent series have set new records for low viewership. The 2023 World Series currently has the lowest rated Games 1, 2, 3, and 4, in the process averaging the lowest rating (4.7) of any series. Since 2006, only four series (2007, 2009, 2016, and 2017) have outdone the 2006 World Series' ratings.

| Game | Ratings (households) | Share (households) | American audience (in millions) |
|---|---|---|---|
| 1 | 8.0 | 15 | 12.84 |
| 2 | 11.6 | 18 | 18.17 |
| 3 | 10.2 | 17 | 15.58 |
| 4 | 10.4 | 18 | 16.11 |
| 5 | 10.3 | 18 | 16.28 |

== Aftermath ==
Neither team made the playoffs the next season. The Tigers finished with 88 wins, eight behind the division champion Cleveland Indians in the AL Central, while the Cardinals finished with 78 wins, seven behind the division champion Chicago Cubs in the NL Central. The 2007 Cardinals were the last defending World Series champion to finish with a losing record and miss the playoffs the next season until the San Francisco Giants followed up their 2012 championship season with a 76–86 record in 2013. Cardinals owner Bill DeWitt Jr. became enamored of a data-driven analytics and fired long-time general manager Walt Jocketty a day after the 2007 season ended.

The Tigers would not make the playoffs again until 2011, when they won the AL Central title for the first time, with their last division title being the 1987 AL East crown. The Tigers won the AL Central again in 2012 and returned to the World Series, where they were swept by the Giants. The Cardinals made the playoffs in 2009, winning the NL Central title, but were swept by the NL West champion Los Angeles Dodgers in the NLDS. They also made it to the playoffs as the Wild Card entry in 2011, winning the National League pennant and going on to beat the Texas Rangers in seven games in the World Series that year, but failed to defend that title in 2012, losing to the Giants in seven games in the NLCS. However, they returned to the World Series in 2013, but lost in six games to the Boston Red Sox.

Chris Carpenter, Yadier Molina and Albert Pujols were the only Cardinals to play in both the 2006 and 2011 World Series. Though Skip Schumaker played a portion of the 2006 season with the Cardinals, he failed to make the postseason roster; however, he later won a World Series with the 2011 Cardinals. Adam Wainwright won a World Series with the 2006 Cardinals, but missed the entire 2011 championship season due to injury. In 2022, Wainwright and Molina, who were the battery that closed out the World Series for St. Louis, broke the record for most games started by a starting pitcher and catcher.

Of the Tigers who played in the 2006 World Series (excluding previous World Series winners such as Iván Rodríguez and Kenny Rogers), only Fernando Rodney and Justin Verlander later won a championship with other teams: Verlander as a member of both the 2017 and 2022 Houston Astros, and Rodney as a member of the 2019 Washington Nationals, whose team defeated Verlander's Astros.

=== Long-term impact ===
The 2006 World Series had lasting effects on both franchises. For the Cardinals, the championship validated general manager Walt Jocketty's roster construction strategy of combining veteran experience with emerging talent, though Jocketty was dismissed after the 2007 season amid philosophical differences with ownership regarding analytics. Several core players from the 2006 roster, including Albert Pujols, Yadier Molina, Adam Wainwright, and Chris Carpenter, became central figures in subsequent playoff runs, culminating in another World Series title in 2011.

For the Tigers, the loss underscored defensive lapses and fielding errors, particularly by the pitching staff, which became an offseason point of emphasis. The club remained competitive in subsequent years, returning to the World Series in 2012 but would not win a championship. Analysts have retrospectively cited the 2006 Series as a turning point for the franchise's identity under manager Jim Leyland, setting expectations for postseason contention through the early 2010s.

== See also ==
- 2006 Asia Series
- 2006 Japan Series
