= Brandon Inge =

American baseball player (born 1977)

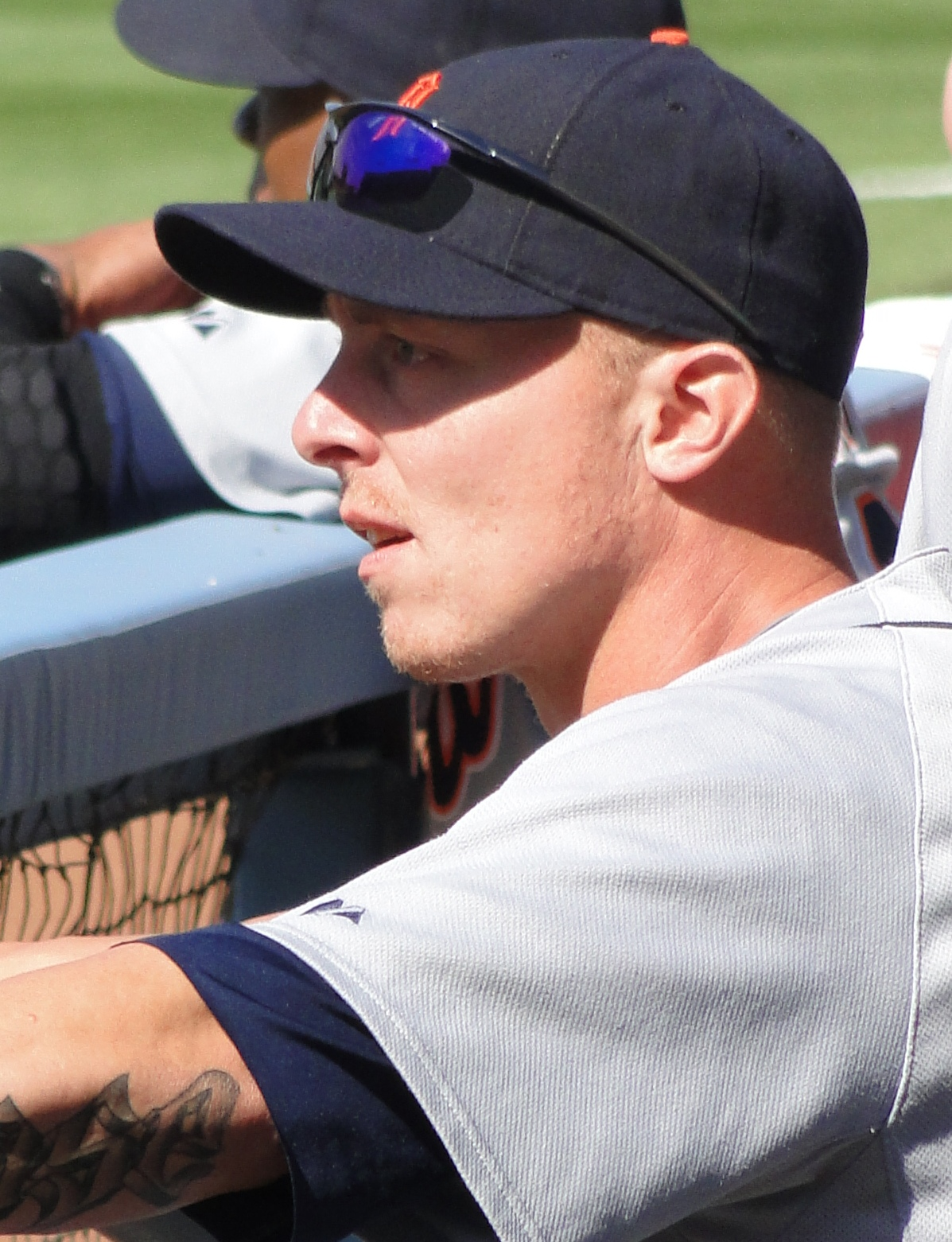
- Inge with the Detroit Tigers in 2010
- Third baseman / Catcher
- Born: May 19, 1977 (age 49); Lynchburg, Virginia, U.S.
- Batted: Right Threw: Right

MLB debut
- April 3, 2001, for the Detroit Tigers

Last MLB appearance
- July 21, 2013, for the Pittsburgh Pirates

MLB statistics
- Batting average: .233
- Home runs: 152
- Runs batted in: 648
- Stats at Baseball Reference

Teams
- Detroit Tigers (2001–2012); Oakland Athletics (2012); Pittsburgh Pirates (2013)

Career highlights and awards
- All-Star (2009)

Charles Brandon Inge (/ˈɪndʒ/ INJ; born May 19, 1977) is an American former professional baseball third baseman and catcher and currently a volunteer assistant coach for the Michigan Wolverines baseball team and an assistant coach for the Brighton High School Varsity baseball team. He played 12 seasons with the Detroit Tigers, one with the Oakland Athletics and one with the Pittsburgh Pirates of Major League Baseball (MLB). He bats and throws right-handed.

Sportswriter Jayson Stark described Inge as a "super-utility dervish." In 2006, his diving stop and subsequent throw from his knees to put out Gary Bennett in an interleague game, on June 25 against the St. Louis Cardinals earned him the ESPN defensive play of the year for a third baseman.

== Early life ==
Inge played baseball at Brookville High School in Lynchburg, Virginia, also playing American Legion Baseball. He was named Legion Baseball's 2010 Graduate of the Year. Brookville retired Inge's uniform number (7).

He then attended Virginia Commonwealth University, where he played on the baseball team as a shortstop and relief pitcher. In 1997 he played collegiate summer baseball in the Cape Cod Baseball League for the Bourne Braves where he was named a league all-star. He was drafted by the Detroit Tigers in the 2nd round of the 1998 Major League Baseball draft.

== Playing career ==
=== Detroit Tigers ===
Inge began his professional career with the Jamestown Jammers, of the Single–A New York–Penn League. In 51 games, Inge batted .230. His 8 homers, 10 doubles, and 29 RBI were all team–high totals. Previously a shortstop, Inge became a catcher.

Inge was promoted to the West Michigan Whitecaps for the 1999 season, making 100 appearances. In June, Inge put together a hitting streak that lasted for 12 games. For the season, he batted .244, with 9 homers and 46 runs batted in. He also stole 15 bases, the highest single–season total for his entire baseball career.

Inge split the 2000 season between the Double–A Jacksonville Suns and the Triple–A Toledo Mud Hens. In 78 games with Jacksonville, he hit 6 homers, drove in 53 runs, and compiled a .258 batting average. Inge saw action in 55 games with the Mud Hens, tallying 5 homers and 20 RBI, but only hitting for a .221 average.

Inge began 2001 in the majors, debuting as Detroit's starting catcher on opening day and throwing out a pair of Minnesota Twins baserunners in the game. On April 6, he got his first MLB base hit, a double against Chicago White Sox pitcher Jim Parque. On June 24, Inge sustained a dislocated left shoulder. He was put on the disabled list the next day and was out of action for a month before he was sent to the Gulf Coast League Tigers for a brief rehab stint. After three games with the GCL Tigers and four games with West Michigan, Inge joined Toledo on August 2 and he remained there until he was recalled by Detroit on September 1. In 27 games with Toledo, Inge batted .289, with 2 homers, 11 doubles, and 15 runs batted in. Inge appeared in 79 games with the Tigers, batting .180 and posting 11 doubles and 15 RBI.

Initially signed as a catcher, Inge struggled offensively in his first three seasons. After the Tigers signed free-agent Iván Rodríguez in 2004, Inge played in the outfield, catcher and at third base, batting .287 with 13 home runs that season.

He started 159 games at third base in 2005, and led all AL third basemen in errors (23), assists (378) and double plays (42). In 2006, Inge exceeded his 2005 totals with 398 assists. That number broke the Detroit Tigers single season record for assists by a third baseman (previously 389 by Aurelio Rodríguez in 1974) and was only 14 short of the all time MLB record for assists by a third baseman (set by Graig Nettles in 1971). Only five third basemen (including Graig Nettles, Brooks Robinson, and Mike Schmidt) have collected more assists in a season than Inge.

In 2006, Inge showed power during the first half, with his 17 home runs tying for the team lead. His slugging percentage was .463 and he placed third on the Tigers with 47 RBIs. After the All-Star Break, he raised his season average from .221 to .253 and finished with a career-high 27 home runs. On October 27, 2006, Inge struck out versus St. Louis Cardinals pitcher Adam Wainwright for the final out of the 2006 World Series.

Inge became expendable at third base after the Tigers acquired Miguel Cabrera in a blockbuster trade with the Florida Marlins. Inge asked management to trade him to a team where he would have a chance to be an everyday player. However, a deal was never made, and the team stated that he would be used as a utility player for the 2008 season. Inge reported to spring training early with the pitchers and catchers. He was named the opening day center fielder after Curtis Granderson was placed on the disabled list.

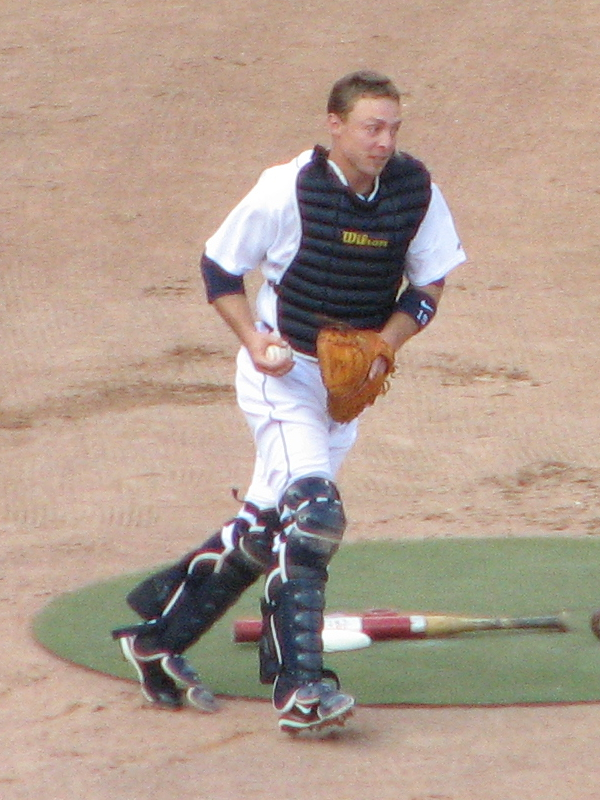
Inge playing as a catcher for the Detroit Tigers in 2008

With the absence of backup catcher Vance Wilson, Inge filled this role for the 13-time Gold Glove winner Iván Rodríguez. Inge took over the catching position full-time after Rodríguez was traded to the New York Yankees on July 30, 2008.

On September 27, Tigers manager Jim Leyland announced that he would move Inge back to third base for the 2009 season.

Inge opened the 2009 season as the starting third baseman for the Tigers. He started the season by successfully reaching base 24 games in a row, the longest such streak for the Tigers since 1976. Through the first half of the 2009 season, Inge led the team in home runs with 21 and was named to the All-Star team.

Having received a record 11.8 million votes in the Final Vote, Inge was selected to his first All Star Game, joining teammates Curtis Granderson, Justin Verlander, and Edwin Jackson on the American League squad. Inge participated in the Home Run Derby and became the eighth player in the history of the Derby to not hit a single home run. He set career highs in games (161) and RBI (84) over the 2009 season, while matching his career high of 27 home runs.

Inge underwent surgery on both of his knees on November 3, 2009. He attended a strengthening and rehabilitation program during the winter. He made a full recovery in time to play midway through spring training, and started at third base on Opening Day of the 2010 season in Kansas City.

On July 19, 2010, Inge was hit on the left hand by a pitch. X-rays revealed a non-displaced fracture of the fifth metacarpal. Although doctors said it would take 4–6 weeks to heal, Inge returned only two weeks later.

On August 24, 2010, Inge achieved his 1,000th career hit against the Kansas City Royals.

On September 25, 2010, Inge set the Tigers franchise mark for strikeouts with 1,100. In the same game, however, he had the game-winning hit in the 13th inning against the Minnesota Twins.

At the conclusion of the season, Tigers general manager Dave Dombrowski announced plans to re-sign Inge to a multi-year contract.

Inge received the 2010 Marvin Miller Man of the Year Award, given by the Major League Baseball Players Association each year "to the player whose on-field performances and community outreach most inspire others to higher levels of achievement."

On June 3, 2011, Inge was placed on the 15-day disabled list with mononucleosis. In 239 plate appearances with Detroit in 2011, he recorded a .177 batting average, before being designated for assignment on July 20. He was outrighted to Triple-A on July 26. In his return to the Tigers on August 20, Inge went 2-for-4, hitting a home run in his first at-bat and driving in two runs, en route to a 10–1 win over the second-place Cleveland Indians.

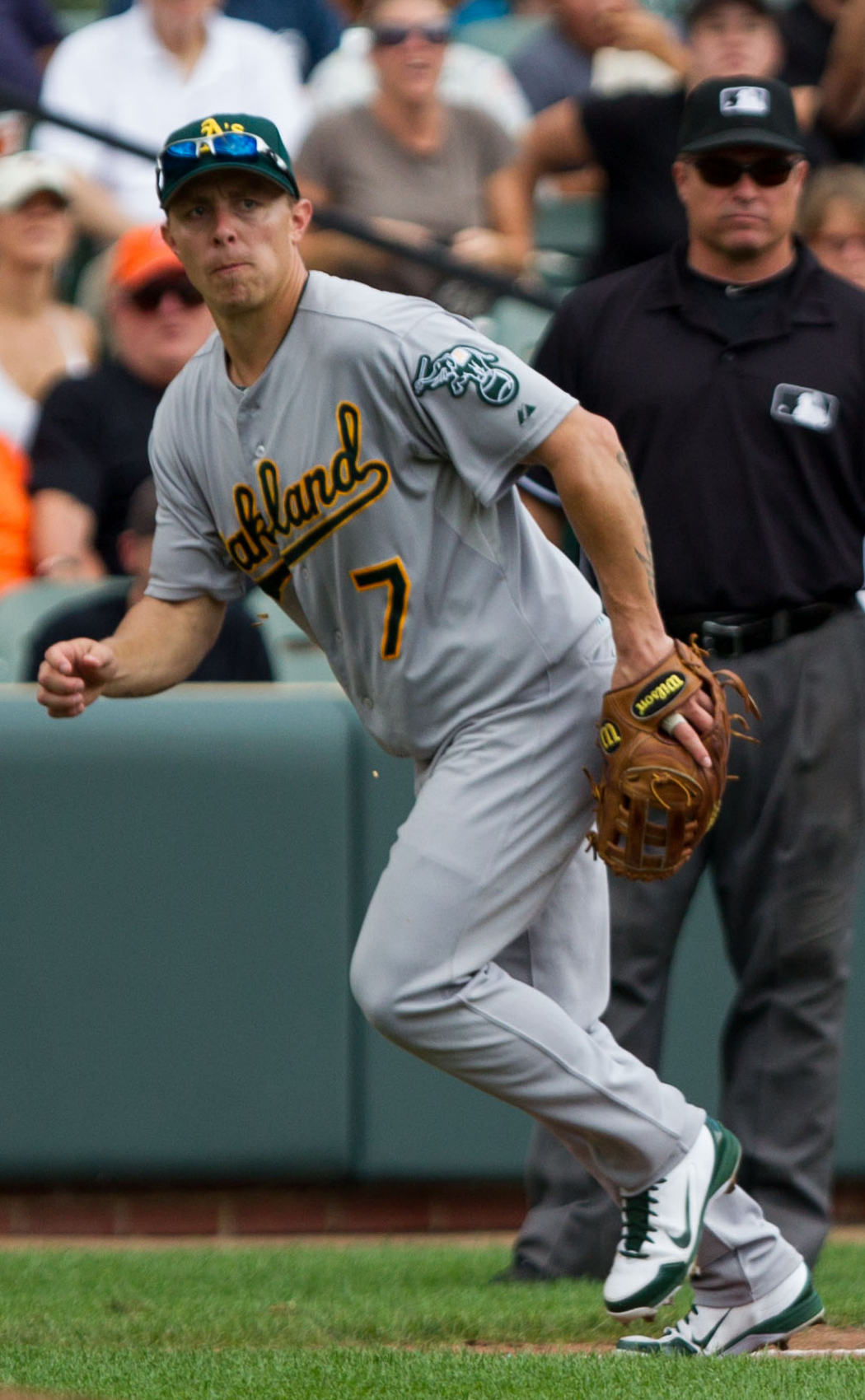
Inge during his tenure with the Oakland Athletics in 2012

As of January 26, 2012, Inge had lost his starting third base job to Miguel Cabrera, who was moving back to the hot corner after the Tigers announced they had signed slugger Prince Fielder to play 1st base. At the press conference announcing the Fielder signing, manager Jim Leyland said that Inge "was not a happy camper". Leyland also said that Inge would be able to play second base for the Tigers, along with Ramon Santiago, and Ryan Raburn, but Inge was still thinking he should have a full-time job. He continued to play second base with the others, as Leyland had said he would, until he was released by the Tigers following their game on April 26, 2012.

=== Oakland Athletics ===
Inge agreed to sign with the Oakland Athletics on April 29, 2012, on a $5.5 million deal. The signing provided infield depth for Oakland, who lost Scott Sizemore to a knee injury. He initially wore number 18, but switched to number 7 after a few games (his old #15 was worn by teammate Seth Smith). In his first game against the Tigers a week later, Inge hit a grand slam. On September 1, after dislocating his shoulder for the second time within a month, Inge was forced to undergo season ending shoulder surgery.

=== Pittsburgh Pirates ===
On February 12, 2013, Inge inked a minor league contract with the Pittsburgh Pirates organization. On March 27, the Pirates selected Inge's contract after he made the team's Opening Day roster. He started the season on the disabled list due to a right shoulder injury. On April 23, Inge was recalled from the Triple-A Indianapolis Indians. In 50 appearances for Pittsburgh, he batted .181/.204/.238 with one home run and seven RBI. Inge was designated for assignment by the Pirates on July 23. He was released by the team after clearing waivers on July 30.

== Post-playing career ==
On January 29, 2021, Inge was named volunteer assistant coach for the 2021 Michigan Wolverines baseball team.

== Personal life ==
Inge currently resides in Michigan. In August 2009, Inge received two tattoos, one on each forearm, on a West Coast road trip. The tattoos are the names of his sons, "Chase" and "Tyler".
