= Steve Mason (broadcaster) =

American sports radio personality

- Born: Stephen J. Macionsky III; Altoona, Pennsylvania
- Sports commentary career
- Team: Los Angeles Lakers
- Genre: Sports commentator
- Sport: Los Angeles Lakers Pregame

Steve Mason is an American broadcast personality based in Southern California since 1992. He is co-host with John Ireland of the "Mason and Ireland" weekday show on ESPN Los Angeles 710 KSPN and previously hosted the pregame show for the stations broadcasts of the Los Angeles Lakers team until 2010.

Mason's career began on WGOR radio based in Toledo, Ohio. He first moved to Los Angeles in 1992, before working on The Late Late Radio Show between 1996 and 1998. Since then, Mason has been heavily involved in sports talk shows in Southern California, best known for his work alongside John Ireland.

He is also a regular contributor on Good Day L.A. on FOX 11 in Los Angeles.

== Early life ==
Mason was born Steven Macionsky in Altoona, Pennsylvania and raised in Maumee, Ohio. He graduated from Maumee High School in 1983 chosen as "Most Likely to Succeed" by his friends on the yearbook staff (there was no actual student vote). In 1982, he was chosen as the outstanding high school student in the state of Ohio and was awarded a full academic scholarship to Bowling Green University, where he was a member of Sigma Phi Epsilon fraternity. In 1986, he was elected to the National Board of Directors for Sigma Phi Epsilon, serving a one-year term. He graduated from BGSU with honors in 1987.

== Career ==
Mason's radio career started while he was still in high school, presenting a 5-minute sportscast on WGOR radio based in Toledo, Ohio. The sportscast ran for around 2 years, before Mason secured an overnight deejay slot on WRQN-FM, 93.5. After impressing in the role, Mason was promoted to the morning drive show, "Mason & Pam" with Pam Gilbert. By 1988, Pam Gilbert was replaced, with the show becoming "Mason & Diane."

The morning radio show became one of the best-known in Ohio state, eventually becoming "Steve Mason's Morning Zoo". While presenting the morning show, he interviewed the likes of Jay Leno, Cher and President Jimmy Carter. After graduating from Bowling Green University, Mason spent a year working in film production. He returned to presenting in 1988, with the morning show regaining first position as the most successful morning show in Ohio. WRQN's parent company, ABS Communications, Inc. then hired Mason as its vice president.

In 1992, Mason moved to Southern California where be began working at XTRA 690 in San Diego. It was in San Diego that he first teamed with John Ireland, a San Diego television sports reporter, in what eventually became The Big Show with Mason & Ireland. The show ran for over five years and for a time also aired on Fox Sports West cable television.

Between 1996 and 1998, Mason co-hosted The Late Late Radio Show with Tom Snyder and Steve Mason for the CBS Radio network. The success of The Late Late Show, led Mason to be a candidate for Later on NBC.

After co-hosting The Late Late Radio Show, it was announced that Mason would be moving to New York City to become the morning talk show host at WNEW. While presenting at WNEW, there were discussions about changing the format from solely music, to a talk radio format. He and Sue Kolinsky were co-talk show hosts of the morning show on WNEW at the time, meaning Mason frequently appeared in the NYC press in 1999 to discuss the fate of the radio network. By June 1999, WNEW had dramatically changed its format across most shows, with Mason and Kolinsky playing a major role in the stations transition with their "Anti-Show". Now rebranded FM Talk@102.7, the NY Post reported that Mason and Kolinsky "given free rein in the all-talk format — have created a comfortable on-air chemistry from 6 to 10 a.m. with their Anti-Show."

In 2000, Mason teamed up with Jim Lampley on the Fox Sports Radio Network ("We Are There with Steve Mason & Jim Lampley). The show ran until 2003. In 2003, Mason and Ireland would re-team in The Big Show with Mason & Ireland, now in Los Angeles for the local ESPN radio outlet, AM710 KSPN. Until late 2007, they had the weekday afternoon 4-7pm drive time slot. In November 2007, in a shuffling of on air talent, Ireland was let go by the station, and Mason was moved to his present 1 to 4pm early afternoon shift. ESPN announced in 2007 that Mason would be filling in for talk show host Dan Patrick, while he was away from work. In 2006 and 2008, Mason was anchor for the coverage of the Winter and Summer Olympics.

In 2008, it was announced that Mason and John Ireland would be reuniting to present a few show in June of that year. The show would remain on ESPN radio, where they previously worked together between 2003 and 2007. By 2009, ESPN 710 stated they had listening figures of around half a million people, but that was expected to grow after ESPN announced they would be broadcasting live Los Angeles Lakers games. Mason and Ireland in the 11am to 3pm slot would then focus on Southern Californian sport, but a large chunk of the talk show at the time was taken up by Lakers fans.

With the success of his ESPN radio talk show, Mason began to appear on TV on a more regular basis. Between 2012 and 2014, he was a regular sports guest on Good Day L.A..

The Mason & Ireland show won the Southern California Broadcasters award in 2015, for the best sports talk show in the region. They retained the award a year later, winning it again in 2017. In 2016, he appeared on Westwood One radio, commentating on the 2016 Summer Olympics.

Steve Mason gained critical acclaim for his work in sports broadcasting when he said, "five words....I believe in Mark Sanchez" on ESPN'S flagship show First Take. Sanchez and the Jets would eventually fall apart later that season, capped off by the infamous butt fumble. Steve Mason continues broadcasting and has been subsequently re-invited to host ESPN'S First Take.

== Other ventures ==
Mason served as an announcer for two Olympics, as part of NBC television's coverage of the Olympics. During the 2002 Winter Olympics he commentated on both bobsledding and ski jumping events. He returned to commentating two years later for the 2004 Summer Olympics, as commentator for shooting events.

As part of his 50th birthday celebrations, Mason took part in the 2015 Indy car series, Grand Prix of Long Beach.

In recent years, Mason has appeared, written and directed a number of films. His first was in 2009, where he wrote, directed and performed in the film, Little Devil. He produced and co-starred in It's Over in 2010, followed by co-starring in Mega Shark vs. Crocosaurus in the same year.

=== Cinema ventures ===
Between 1995 and 2015, Mason owned 3 movie theatres in the state of California. Between 1996 and 1998, Mason owned a movie theatre in Saipan. From 2003 onwards, Mason was part owner of the Cinemas Palme d'Or brand, along with actor Bryan Cranston. The brand ran a number of specialist theatres in the Los Angeles area.

In 2006, the cinema brand began an antitrust lawsuit against Cinemark. They believed that the third largest cinema company in the United States was making deals with distributors making it impossible for smaller theatres to compete. Cranston and Mason continued to pursue the antitrust lawsuit against Cinemark. In May 2016, a court of appeals reinstated the antitrust lawsuit, which opened up the opportunity for the case to be heard in front of a jury.

In 2016, it was announced that a lawsuit with a major cineplex firm meant that the company could no longer operate, with the cinemas closing their doors on June 30, 2016. The issue arose when the indie cinema group couldn't secure deals to show major titles, accusing Cinemark of circuit dealing and securing films and an uncompetitive rate. This was one major case in an ongoing battle between individual/small cinema groups and large cinema groups in the United States. The ownership of the indie cinemas was taken up on July 1, 2016 to rescue the cinema.

As part of his interest in cinema and films, Mason set up a venture in predicting box office revenues and incomes. He ran the blog, Fantasy Moguls, which is modeled on fantasy football prediction leagues.

== Personal life ==
In March 2016, Mason announced that he was gay, while on-air at ESPN radio. Mason and his co-talk show host John Ireland were in the middle of a segment of the show, when Mason mentioned his orientation in passing. It was stated after the event that many people close to Mason knew he was gay. During an interview, he stated having numerous discussions with his boss about talking about it on air. Mason stated in an interview that the delay in making the announcement was due to his worry that being gay might have damaged his career, but hoped it would allow professional athletes to be open about their sexuality.
