= Travis Rodgers =

Travis Rodgers is a sports talk radio personality on Los Angeles ESPN affiliate KSPN (AM). He was the host of the Yahoo! Sports Radio program, Travis Rodgers Now, which aired weekdays 12-2pm EST. He also co-hosted the KLAA 830 AM program ESPN Morning Show with Kelvin Washington. Prior to his radio shows, he was the producer of the nationally syndicated Jim Rome Show and the ESPN television show Jim Rome is Burning.

== Early life ==
Travis Rodgers grew up in Arcadia, California. He graduated from Arcadia High School. He attended University of California, Santa Barbara, where he graduated with a BS in Political Science. He pitched for the UCSB baseball team for four seasons.

== Radio career ==
Rodgers was hired to work for the Los Angeles radio show The Jim Rome Show, becoming the producer in 1996. Through the efforts of Rome and Rodgers working together, they were able to syndicate the program, eventually reaching more than 200 affiliates in the United States and Canada. After it was announced that he was moving on 'to bigger and better things' in 2009 (Rodgers later acknowledged that he was fired), he was hired in 2010 by KGOW 1560 AM, in Houston. At the beginning of 2011, he added a national program with Sporting News Radio which became Yahoo Sports Radio in September of that year, and was voted Best Sport Talk Host of 2011 by the Houston Press.

In 2012, Rodgers moved his program to KLAA 830 and began The Travis Rodgers Morning Show, based in Anaheim, California, and soon after KGOW dropped his local Houston program. Rodgers maintains his Yahoo! Sports Radio show as well as his local KLAA programming from 6–9 am PT, (his first national broadcast hour is also carried on KLAA from 9–10am PT). Rodgers's local program is advertised as "the only live, local morning sports show in the Los Angeles market". However, as of 2015 due to low rating, the show was discontinued.

Travis Rodgers then co-hosted ESPN LA's Afternoons with Marcellus & Travis. He also does event adjacent programming for the Los Angeles Lakers & Rams. On September 4, 2018, he moved to mornings as co-host with Keyshawn Johnson and LZ Granderson, also on ESPN 710.

== Travis Rodgers Now ==
Rodgers considers his new show a blend of pop culture and sports, in that order. Rodgers varies from the normal sports talk format in several ways. Rodgers prefers to use Twitter over traditional phone calls or emails; he encourages listeners to tweet the show to comment on the issues of the day and reads tweets he finds interesting, insightful, or funny.

One of Rodgers' regular guests is his friend Brian Beckner; he joins The show for a weekly segment or two entitled "The Friday Facts." Rodgers has stated on the air that his conversations with Beckner are a highlight of the show.

Travis Rodgers Now is podcast at Yahoo! Sports Radio Podcasts, along with the other YSR shows. The national show can be streamed Yahoo! Sports Radio from Noon to 2pm ET.

Beginning in 2012, Rodgers held his Big Fan Bracket tournament, in which he pitted all the things of which he considered himself a "big fan:" mostly, but not exclusively, models and actresses. The first winner was Dominique Sachse.

== See also ==
- Yahoo! Sports Radio
- KLAA AM
- KGOW
- The Jim Rome Show
