= John Ireland (sportscaster) =

American sportscaster

- Born: John Alexander Ireland Jr. July 15, 1963 (age 63)
- Sports commentary career
- Team: Los Angeles Lakers
- Genres: play-by-play; Sports commentator
- Sport: Los Angeles Lakers

John Alexander Ireland Jr. (born July 15, 1963) is an American sportscaster based in Southern California, who is currently the radio play-by-play voice announcer for the Los Angeles Lakers of the National Basketball Association (NBA).

== Early life ==
Ireland was born in Newport Beach, California to Myrna and John Ireland and was raised in the neighborhood Corona del Mar, Newport Beach.

== Radio career ==
Since 2011, Ireland has been employed as the radio play-by-play announcer for the Los Angeles Lakers. He also hosts (along with Steve Mason) a Monday-Friday sports talk show on KSPN-AM radio, from 12:55pm to 3:55pm.

Previously, Ireland hosted shows at XTRA-AM in San Diego, KLAC-AM in Los Angeles, and nationally on the Fox Sports Radio network. From 1997 to 2000, Mason and Ireland hosted a live TV/Radio simulcast on the Fox Sports West cable network.

Prior to being named the Lakers announcer, he did part-time play-by-play and sideline work for the Los Angeles Clippers, as well as UCLA football and basketball.

== Television career ==
From 1995 through 2012, Ireland was employed as a sports anchor/reporter by KCBS/KCAL-TV, the Viacom-owned duopoly in Los Angeles. From 2002 to 2010, he worked as the sideline reporter for all Los Angeles Lakers broadcasts on KCAL-TV.

Previously, he worked as a sportscaster at KTVE-TV in Monroe, Louisiana; KBMT-TV in Beaumont, Texas; and KUSI-TV in San Diego, California. In San Diego, he won two Emmy awards for best sportscast.

== Education ==
Ireland is a graduate of Corona del Mar High School, in Newport Beach, California, Class of 1981. In high school, he was a member of the basketball team and wrote for Trident Magazine.

He received a bachelor's degree in history from UCLA in 1985, on what he laughingly describes as the "10-year plan," and was the sports director of the campus radio station, KLA-AM. He is a member of the Sigma Chi Fraternity.
