= The Jim Rome Show =

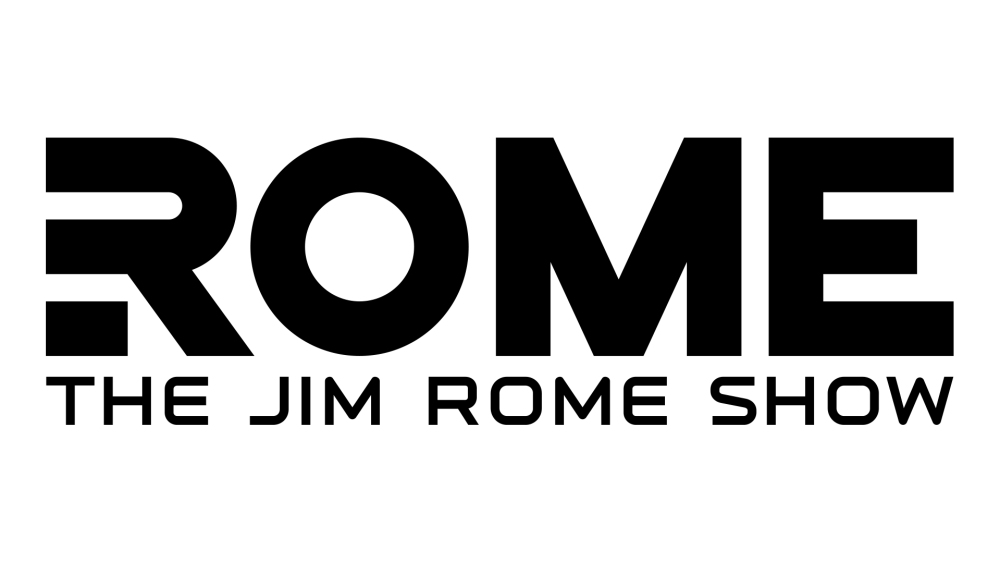
- Other names: The Jungle
- Genre: Sports talk
- Running time: 12–3pm PT
- Country of origin: United States
- Language: English
- Syndicates: Westwood One
- TV adaptations: Jim Rome is Burning; Rome
- Starring: Jim Rome
- Executive producer: Tom Di Benedetto
- Recording studio: Costa Mesa, California (on-air ID "Southern California"; as of 2018)
- Original release: 1996
- Opening theme: "Lust for Life" by Iggy Pop
- Ending theme: "Lust for Life" by Iggy Pop
- Website: JimRome.com

The Jim Rome Show is an American sports radio talk show hosted by Jim Rome. It airs live for three hours each weekday from 12pm to 3pm Pacific Time. The show is produced in Los Angeles, syndicated by Westwood One, and can be heard on affiliate radio stations in the U.S. and Canada.

== History ==
The Jim Rome Show began on XTRA Sports 690 in San Diego. In 1996, Premiere Radio Networks picked up the program for national syndication. Sometime after, the show was shortened by one hour and the broadcast location was shifted from XTRA Sports 690 to the Premiere Radio Networks studio complex in Sherman Oaks, California.

The show became a charter program of CBS Sports Radio, later Infinity Sports Network, upon its full launch on January 2, 2013.

In October 2017, CBS Sports Network announced that it would add a simulcast of The Jim Rome Show to its afternoon lineup beginning January 2, 2018, ultimately running it until February 9, 2024. The show began streaming on the social media service X on May 28, 2024, and on YouTube June 22, 2026. The show also began broadcasting on September 19, 2024, on various free ad-supported streaming television (FAST) channels.

On January 6, 2025, the show swapped positions with The Rich Eisen Show, moving from 9am to 12pm PT and moving from Infinity Sports Network to Westwood One. In October 2025, it was announced that in December 2025 Rome would return to Infinity Sports Network as part of Westwood One's assumption of day-to-day operations for the network, rebranded as Westwood One Sports.

== Show personnel ("The XR4Ti") ==
As of January 2026, staff includes Tom "Count Chocula" Di Benedetto, executive producer (EP) and call screener since 2021; Alvin Delloro, engineer since 2005; James "Flight Deck" Kelley, digital program director since c. 2010; Cindy Stirling; Alex Hardy; and Lorn McLaren of the "XCR" (video control room staff), assistant director and graphics producer since 2024.

Former staff includes EPs Travis Rodgers (1996 to 2009), Kyle Brandt (2009 to 2016, producer back to 2007), and Adam Hawk (2016 to 2021), as well as Brian "Whitey" Albers, Keith Arnold, Robert Dozmati, Mike Goldfarb, Austin Huff, Gerrit Ritt, Jack Savage, Jason Stewart, (Note: "3/8/2013 Jason Stewart's Farewell Show". Stucknut.com website.) Dave Whelan, and Imanni Wright.

== Show format and content ==
The three-hour program is a mixture of interviews, calls, emails, Tweets and Rome's own thoughts and analysis. On the radio, the opening and closing theme is "Lust for Life" by Iggy Pop, and the show also uses "Welcome to the Jungle" by Guns N' Roses and "Up All Night" by The Boomtown Rats. The program usually begins with headlines, when Rome highlights the main sports news of the day with his thoughts and opinions. Rome refers to his listeners as "Clones". A staple of the program is the Smack Off, an annual show on which the best callers compete against each other for a cash prize.

Friday episodes include the week rewind, known as "Alvin Delloro's Week that Was", which is a compilation of show highlights over the past week alongside a mix of music. The engineers' sound bites have been an integral part of the show; in 1998, Rome released an album entitled Welcome to the Jungle, which features some of the show's memorable sound bites and music.

A FAST channel exclusive show, The After Hour, aired from September 19, 2024, to May 15, 2026.

From February 11 to March 11, 2009, all of Rome's shows contained an interview with an individual with the given name Rex.
