= Doug Krikorian =

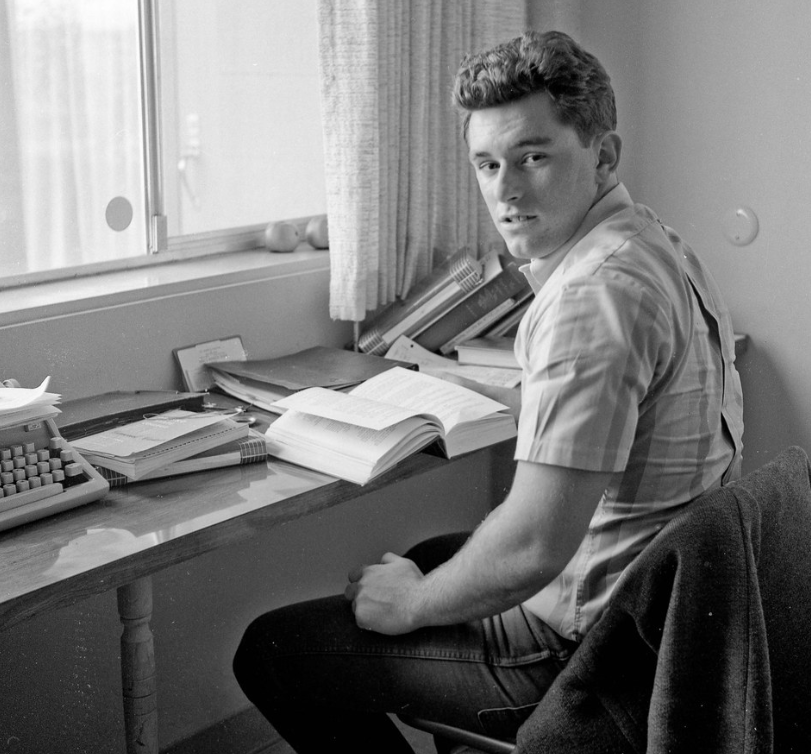
Jan 23rd, 1964, Doug Krikorian, Fresno State College

Doug Krikorian is a veteran sportswriter and sports talk show host based in the Los Angeles area. He is also known for his autobiography titled "Between the Bylines: The Life, Love, and Loss of Los Angeles's Most Colorful Sports Journalist," published in 2013.

Krikorian covered the Southern California sporting scene for more than 45 years for the Los Angeles Herald Examiner and then the Long Beach Press Telegram. Krikorian gained a reputation for his views on the Lakers, Dodgers, Angels Clippers, USC and UCLA. He covered most of the big fights in the 1980s and 1990s. He monitored the Ram teams of Carroll Rosenbloom and then Georgia Frontiere, as well as Al Davis' Raiders when those two organizations were in Los Angeles. He also was a part of the "McDonnell-Douglas" radio show for more than a decade.
