= D'Marco Farr =

American football player and broadcaster (born 1971)

No. 75
- Position: Defensive tackle

Personal information
- Born: June 9, 1971 (age 55); San Pablo, California, U.S.
- Listed height: 6 ft 1 in (1.85 m)
- Listed weight: 276 lb (125 kg)

Career information
- High school: John F. Kennedy (Richmond, California)
- College: Washington
- NFL draft: 1994: undrafted

Career history
- Los Angeles / St. Louis Rams (1994–2000); San Francisco 49ers (2003)*
- * Offseason or practice squad member only

Awards and highlights
- Super Bowl champion (XXXIV); Pro Bowl (1999); National champion (1991); Morris Trophy (1993); Second-team All-Pac-10 (1993)

Career NFL statistics
- Tackles: 251
- Sacks: 36.5
- Interceptions: 3
- Stats at Pro Football Reference

D'Marco Marcellus Farr (born June 9, 1971) is an American former professional football player who was a defensive tackle for the Los Angeles/St. Louis Rams of the National Football League (NFL). He played for the Rams from 1994 to 2000 and recorded 36.5 career sacks. He was a member of the Rams team that won Super Bowl XXXIV. He became a sideline reporter for the Los Angeles Rams.

== Early life and college ==
Farr played high school football at John F. Kennedy High School in Richmond, California. In college, he was a member of the undefeated 1991 University of Washington team that won the CNN/USA Today NCAA National Championship.

== NFL career ==
Farr was signed as an undrafted free agent by the Los Angeles Rams out of the University of Washington in 1994. He had his best season in 1995 when he recorded 11.5 sacks and 1 interception. Farr recorded 8.5 sacks in the Rams' 1999 Super Bowl season.

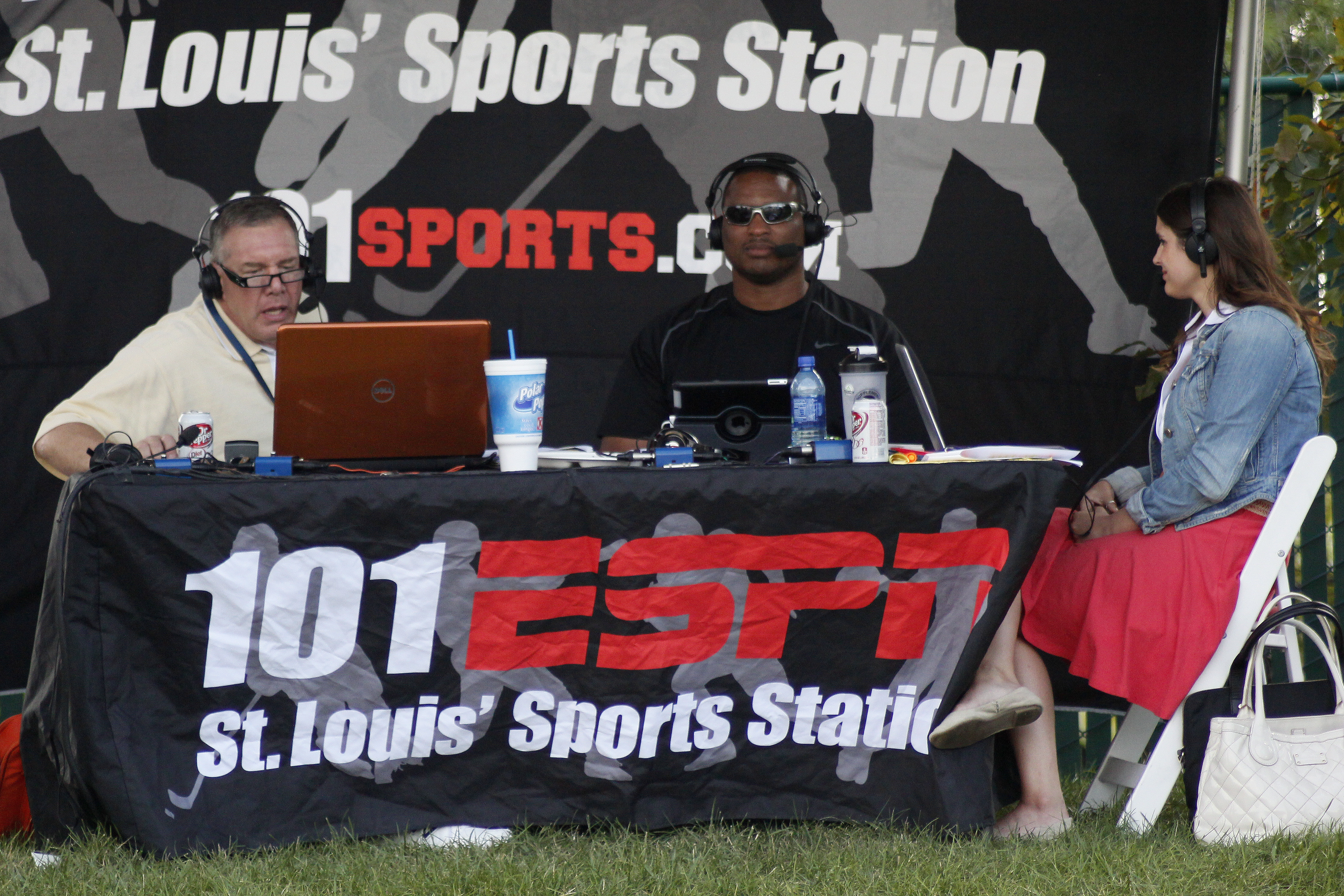
from left: Randy Karraker, Farr, and Michelle Smallmon

Farr was cut by the Rams after the 2000–01 season.

== NFL career statistics ==
Legend
	Won the Super Bowl
**Bold**	Career high

=== Regular season ===
Year	Team	Games		Tackles				Interceptions				Fumbles			
Year	Team	GP	GS	Comb	Solo	Ast	Sck	Int	Yds	TD	Lng	FF	FR	Yds	TD
1994	LA	10	3	11	9	2	1.0	0	0	0	0	0	0	0	0
1995	STL	16	16	50	**48**	2	**11.5**	**1**	5	0	5	**5**	0	0	0
1996	STL	16	16	**53**	43	10	4.5	**1**	5	0	5	1	0	0	0
1997	STL	16	16	36	26	10	3.0	**1**	**22**	0	**22**	1	**2**	0	0
1998	STL	16	16	45	34	**11**	7.0	0	0	0	0	1	1	**18**	0
1999	STL	16	16	40	34	6	8.5	0	0	0	0	4	0	0	0
2000	STL	10	5	16	12	4	1.0	0	0	0	0	0	0	0	0
		100	88	251	206	45	36.5	3	32	0	22	12	3	18	0

=== Playoffs ===
Year	Team	Games		Tackles				Interceptions				Fumbles			
Year	Team	GP	GS	Comb	Solo	Ast	Sck	Int	Yds	TD	Lng	FF	FR	Yds	TD
1999	STL	3	3	**12**	**11**	**1**	**1.0**	0	0	0	0	**2**	**1**	0	0
2000	STL	1	0	1	1	0	0.0	0	0	0	0	0	0	0	0
		4	3	13	12	1	1.0	0	0	0	0	2	1	0	0

== Broadcasting ==
After his playing career ended, Farr became a regular on the sports talk show The Best Damn Sports Show Period on Fox Sports Net. He has remained on FSN as a co-host of the network's college football coverage.

From 2005 until September 2007, Farr hosted the D'Marco Farr Show with Kevin Kiley on KSPN in Los Angeles.

On September 21, 2007, co-host Kevin Kiley announced that Farr had "retired from sports radio" to "pursue opportunities in professional football".

Previously, until November 2006, Farr was the co-host with Gary Miller; however, Miller was fired and replaced by guest hosts until January 2007, when Kevin Kiley joined the show as co-host.

Farr was a part of the St. Louis Rams broadcasts, doing TV color commentary for KTVI FOX 2 in the preseason, and providing analysis for radio broadcasts during the season, previously for 103.3 KLOU, and from 2008 until 2016, 101.1 WXOS.

He was also a part of the station's afternoon drive program, The Fast Lane, with Randy Karraker and former St. Louis Cardinals pitcher Brad Thompson. From 2009 until 2016, Farr was the lead color commentator for the Rams Radio broadcasts on 101 ESPN. He replaced former coach Jim Hanifan. On August 5, 2016, Farr announced he was leaving 101.1 FM and joining the Los Angeles Rams broadcasting team on KSPN Los Angeles (which consists of J.B. Long and Maurice Jones-Drew).
