= Randy Karraker =

American sportscaster (born 1962)

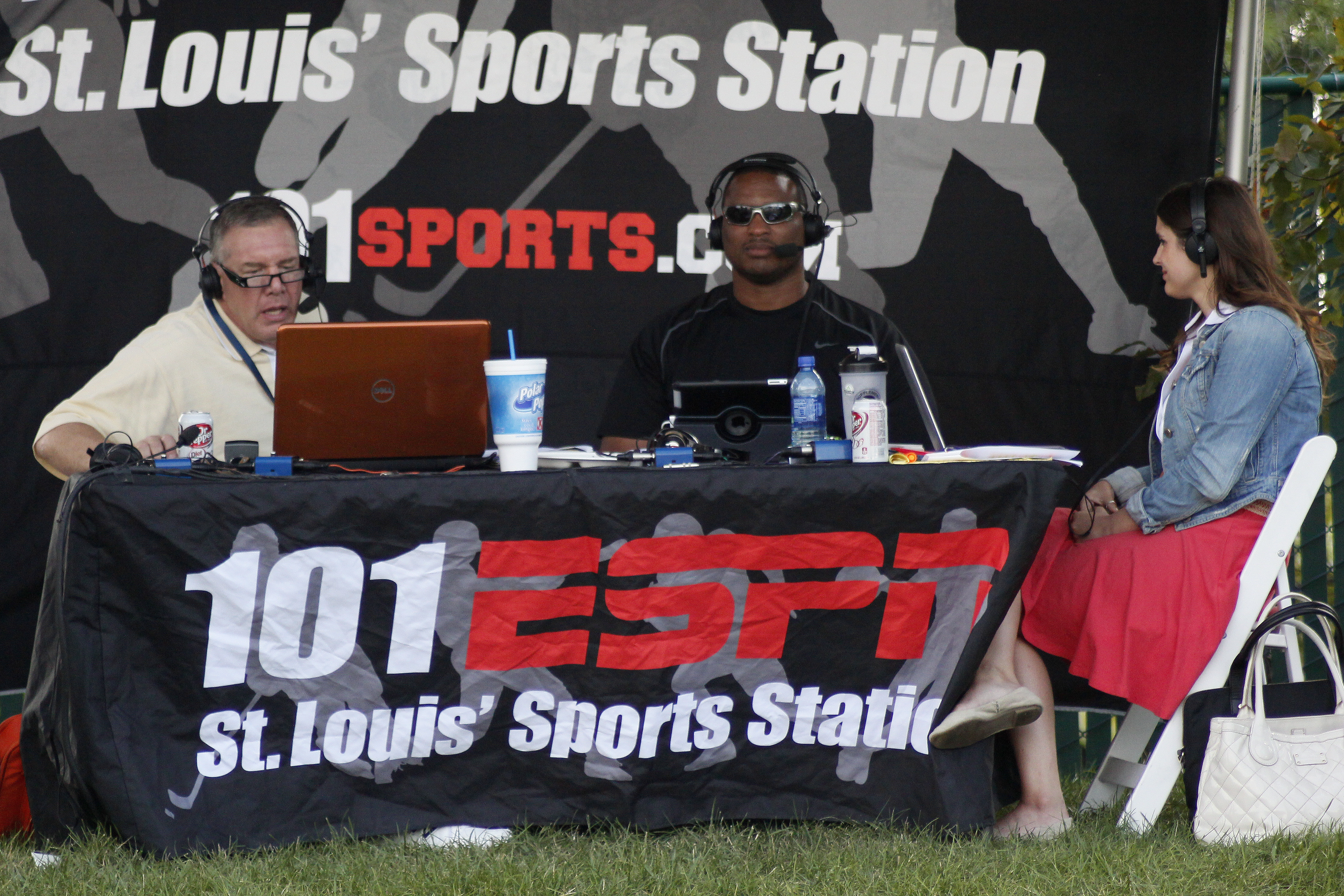
- from left: Karraker, D'Marco Farr, and Michelle Smallmon
- Born: August 19, 1962 (age 63)
- Other names: Megamind, Uncle Randy
- Occupation: Sportscaster
- Website: http://www.101espn.com/people/randyk/blog

Randall James Karraker (born August 19, 1962) is an American sportscaster in St. Louis, Missouri. He is the former host of The Fast Lane, the top-rated sports radio show in St. Louis, on 101 ESPN, with former St. Louis Cardinals player Brad Thompson and Chris Rongey. He was also the host of the St. Louis Rams pregame shows on 101 ESPN up until the team's move to Los Angeles in January 2016. He hosted this show with former NFL coach Jim Hanifan, before Hanifan was replaced by Rick Venturi in 2009, and then with Anthony Stalter up until the team's departure. In 2009 and 2010, he was also the television voice of Southern Illinois Edwardsville Cougars basketball on CCIN. He used to be the host of the popular CCIN television program Chalk Talk, with Malcolm Briggs, McGraw Millhaven, and Tony Twist.

Karraker left "The Fast Lane" on May 1, 2020, to host his own show on 101, "Karraker and Smallmon."

Before arriving at 101 ESPN, Karraker had an 18-year stint at KMOX, working his way up from an intern to the host of the station's marquee sports program, Sports Open Line, after which he had two shorter stints at KTRS and Team 1380, where he hosted an afternoon drive program, The Roll Home, with St. Louis Post-Dispatch columnist Bernie Miklasz.

He attended Lindenwood University, then known as Lindenwood College, in St. Charles, Missouri, which also produced sportscasters Greg Amsinger and Dan McLaughlin.
