= 1937 Pittsburgh Americans season =

- Head coach: Jess Quatse
- Home stadium: Forbes Field

Results
- Record: 1-3
- Division place: No divisions
- Playoffs: No playoffs

The 1937 Pittsburgh Americans season was their second and final season in existence. The team played in the American Football League would go on to post a 1-3 record overall, and a 0-3 league record, before folding halfway through the season.

== Schedule ==
Game	Date	Opponent	Result
1	September 10, 1937	Los Angeles Bulldogs	L 21-0
2	September 17, 1937	New York Yankees	Canceled
3	October 5, 1937	at Cincinnati Bengals	L 21-0
4	October 10, 1937	at Springfield Merchants	W 20-7
5	October 21, 1937	at Boston Shamrocks	L 27-7
6	October 27, 1937	at New York Yankees	Canceled
7	November 7, 1937	at Rochester Tigers	Canceled
8	November 11, 1937	at Salinas Iceberg Packers	Canceled

== Final league standings ==
Team	W	L	T	Pct.	PF	PA	Coach
Los Angeles Bulldogs	8	0	0	1.000	219	69	Gus Henderson
Rochester Tigers	3	3	1	.500	94	115	Mike Palm
New York Yankees	2	3	1	.400	57	115	Jack McBride
Cincinnati Bengals	2	3	2	.400	102	89	Hal Pennington
Boston Shamrocks	2	5	0	.286	76	98	George Kenneally
Pittsburgh Americans	0	3	0	.000	7	69	
