= 1936 Pittsburgh Americans season =

- Head coach: Rudy Comstock
- Home stadium: Forbes Field

Results
- Record: 3-3-1
- Division place: No divisions
- Playoffs: No playoffs

The 1936 Pittsburgh Americans season was their first season in existence. The team played in the American Football League would go on to post a 3-3-1 record overall, and a 3-2-1 league record.

== Schedule ==
Game	Date	Opponent	Result	Record
1	September 20	at Warren Red Jackets	L 6–7	
2	October 4	at Syracuse Braves	W 27–16	1–0
3	October 7	at Boston Shamrocks	L 7–16	1–1
4	October 18	Brooklyn Tigers	W 17–13	2–1
5	October 21	at New York Yankees	L 6–7	2–2
6	November 1	at Cleveland Rams	T 7–7	2–2–1
7	November 8	Boston Shamrocks	W 14–6	3–2–1
8	November 11	at Brooklyn Tigers	Canceled	3–2–1
9	November 15	Cleveland Rams	Canceled	3–2–1
10	November 26	New York Yankees	Canceled	3–2–1

== Final standings ==
=== Final 1936 standings ===
Team	W	L	T	Pct.	PF	PA
Boston Shamrocks	8	3	0	.727	133	97
Cleveland Rams	5	2	2	.714	123	77
New York Yankees	5	3	2	.625	75	74
Pittsburgh Americans	3	2	1	.600	78	65
Syracuse/Rochester Braves	1	6	0	.147	51	113
Brooklyn/Rochester Tigers	0	6	1	.000	58	82
