= 1937 American Football League season =

The 1937 AFL season is the second and final season of the second American Football League. After the folding of the Syracuse/Rochester Braves in the 1936 season and the departure of the Cleveland Rams for the National Football League, the league added the Cincinnati Bengals and the Los Angeles Bulldogs, the latter being the first professional football team to play its home games on the American West Coast.

The season got off to a rocky start, with the Pittsburgh Americans folding after playing only three games. After a 1936 move from Brooklyn, the Rochester Tigers limped through with a paucity of fan support. The defending champion Boston Shamrocks and 1936 contender New York Yankees were hit hard by the raiding of their rosters by the NFL, a counterpoint to the latter's method of building its squad; as a result, both wound up with losing records (Boston's 2–5–0 and New York's 2–3–1). Cincinnati's Bengals almost matched the Yankees in their futility, finishing with a 2–3–2 record.

Only two teams in the AFL finished with a .500 or better record in 1937: the Rochester Tigers and the team that was rejected when the NFL admitted the Rams, the Los Angeles Bulldogs The West Coast newcomers dominated the league, finishing 8–0–0, the first perfect season (no losses, no ties) by a professional football team while winning its league championship (the 1948 Cleveland Browns and the 1972 Miami Dolphins would later match the feat).

The Bulldogs had an average 14,000 attendance for its 1937 home games, comparable to the draws of the Rams, Shamrocks, and Yankees the previous year, but Cleveland's absence and decline of the other two 1936 contenders (both on the field and in the stands) proved devastating to the AFL. Of the six AFL teams, only Los Angeles made a profit. With the league owners having lost their optimism, the second American Football League came to an end. The Cincinnati Bengals and Los Angeles Bulldogs continued their existence as independent teams while the other AFL franchises ceased to exist.

== Final standings ==
| Team | W | L | T | Pct. | PF | PA | Coach |
|---|---|---|---|---|---|---|---|
| Los Angeles Bulldogs | 8 | 0 | 0 | 1.000 | 219 | 69 | Gus Henderson |
| Rochester Tigers | 3 | 3 | 1 | .500 | 94 | 115 | Mike Palm |
| New York Yankees | 2 | 3 | 1 | .400 | 57 | 115 | Jack McBride |
| Cincinnati Bengals | 2 | 3 | 2 | .400 | 102 | 89 | Hal Pennington |
| Boston Shamrocks | 2 | 5 | 0 | .286 | 76 | 98 | George Kenneally |
| Pittsburgh Americans | 0 | 3 | 0 | .000 | 7 | 69 | Jess Quatse |

== All-League selections ==
Bill Moore, Los Angeles (end)
Bill Steinkinber, Cincinnati (tackle)
Pete Meloringer, Los Angeles (guard)
Lee Mullenuaux, Cincinnati (center)
Alex Drobnitch, New York (guard)
Harry Field, Los Angeles (tackle)
Red Fleming, Boston (end)
Harry Newman, Los Angeles (quarterback)
Don Geyer, Cincinnati (halfback)
Al Nidelazri, Los Angeles (halfback)
Gordon Gore, Los Angeles (fullback)

== See also ==
- 1936 American Football League season
- 1937 NFL season
