= 1936 American Football League season =

The 1936 AFL season is the first season of the second American Football League, the formation of which was announced by Harry March, former personnel director of the NFL's New York Giants, on December 15, 1935. Fifteen cities bid for charter franchises; on April 11, 1936, franchises were awarded to eight cities: Boston, Cleveland, Jersey City, New York, Philadelphia, Pittsburgh, Providence, and Syracuse. By mid-summer, Jersey City, Philadelphia, and Providence withdrew; soon afterwards, Rochester was given a franchise, only to have it relocated to Brooklyn, despite the lack of availability of a home stadium at the time.

The league began its existence by raiding NFL rosters for its players, with a new New York Yankees team signing members of the New York Giants, the Cleveland Rams taking Chicago Bears star Damon Wetzel as their coach, and the Pittsburgh Americans snaring members of the crosstown Pirates. On the other hand, eventual AFL champions Boston Shamrocks pretty much ignored the roster of the crosstown Boston Redskins, while the Brooklyn Tigers and Syracuse Braves opted for "home grown" talent.

The race to the 1936 AFL championship quickly narrowed down to three teams (Boston, Cleveland, and New York) as the Syracuse team was moved to Rochester after a deafening lack of fan support while it lost almost every game. The former Syracuse Braves became the Rochester Braves in early October 1936 — and folded after their game on November 1. Two weeks later, the Brooklyn Tigers moved to Rochester and became the Rochester Tigers. The two Rochester teams finished in the bottom of the league standings.

In contrast to the following year, the majority of the AFL had winning records in 1936 (the two Rochester teams had one win combined). The Pittsburgh Americans finished with a 3-2-1 record despite averaging only 2500 fans in the Forbes Field stands; the Boston Shamrocks (8-3-0) won the title by defeating both the Cleveland Rams (5-2-2) and the New York Yankees (5-3-2) in the season's final weeks.

== Final standings ==
Team	W	L	T	Pct.	PF	PA	Coach
Boston Shamrocks	8	3	0	.727	133	97	George Kenneally
Cleveland Rams	5	2	2	.714	123	77	Damon Wetzel
New York Yankees	5	3	2	.625	75	74	Jack McBride
Pittsburgh Americans	3	2	1	.600	78	65	Rudy Comstock
Syracuse/Rochester Braves	1	6	0	.147	41	113	Don Irwin, Red Badgro
Brooklyn/Rochester Tigers	0	6	1	.000	58	82	Mike Palm

Results of AFL games - 1936 season

PRESEASON

September 13, Municipal Stadium, Syracuse, New York: Syracuse Braves 14, Watertown Red & Black 7

WEEK ONE

September 20, Municipal Stadium, Syracuse, New York: Boston Shamrocks 14, Syracuse Braves 3

WEEK TWO

September 27, Triborough Stadium, New York, New York: New York Yankees 13, Syracuse Braves 6
September 30, Braves Field, Boston, Massachusetts: Boston Shamrocks 7, New York Yankees 0

WEEK THREE

October 4, Municipal Stadium, Syracuse: Pittsburgh Americans 27, Syracuse Braves 16
October 7, Fenway Park, Boston: Boston Shamrocks 16, Pittsburgh Americans 7

WEEK FOUR

October 11, Municipal Stadium, Cleveland, Ohio: Cleveland Rams 26, Syracuse Braves 0
October 11, Fenway Park, Boston: Boston Shamrocks 10, Brooklyn Tigers 6
October 14, Triborough Stadium, New York: New York Yankees 17, Brooklyn Tigers 6

WEEK FIVE

October 18, Municipal Stadium, Syracuse: New York Yankees 13, Syracuse Braves 0
October 18, Forbes Field, Pittsburgh: Pittsburgh Americans 17, Brooklyn Tigers 13
October 18, Municipal Stadium, Cleveland: Boston Shamrocks 9, Cleveland Rams 0
October 21, Yankee Stadium, New York: New York Yankees 7, Pittsburgh Americans 6

WEEK SIX

October 25, Municipal Stadium, Cleveland: Cleveland Rams 27, New York Yankees 0
October 25, Fenway Park, Boston: Syracuse Braves 16, Boston Shamrocks 7
October 28, Yankee Stadium, New York: Cleveland Rams 0, New York Yankees 0 (tie)

WEEK SEVEN

November 1, Municipal Stadium, Cleveland: Pittsburgh Americans 0, Cleveland Rams 0 (tie)
November 1, Yankee Stadium, Brooklyn: New York Yankees 3, Brooklyn Tigers 3 (tie – game moved from Ebbets Field)
November 1, Red Wing Stadium, Rochester: Boston Shamrocks 13, Rochester Braves 0 (Braves fold after game)

WEEK EIGHT

November 8, Forbes Field, Pittsburgh: Pittsburgh Americans 14, Boston Shamrocks 6
November 8, Municipal Stadium, Cleveland: Cleveland Rams 15, Brooklyn Tigers 14
November 11, Fenway Park, Boston: Cleveland Rams 34, Boston Shamrocks 26

WEEK NINE

November 15, Yankee Stadium, New York: Boston Shamrocks 12, New York Yankees 7

WEEK TEN

November 22, Municipal Stadium, Cleveland: New York Yankees 15, Cleveland Rams 7
November 22, Red Wing Stadium, Rochester: Boston Shamrocks 13, Rochester Tigers 10
November 26, Red Wing Stadium, Rochester: Cleveland Rams 7, Rochester Tigers 6

== See also ==
- 1936 NFL season
- 1936 Cleveland Rams season
- 1937 American Football League season
