= 1936 Cleveland Rams season =

NFL team season (inaugural)

- Head coach: Damon Wetzel
- Home stadium: Cleveland Municipal Stadium

Results
- Record: 5–2–2
- League place: 2nd (AFL) Regular Season
- Playoffs: League Champions after Boston Shamrocks forfeit playoff game

The 1936 Cleveland Rams season was the team's only year with the American Football League and the first season in Cleveland. The team won its first of four franchise league championships.

== Schedule ==
Game	Date	Opponent	Result	Record	Venue
1	October 11	Syracuse Braves	W 26–0	1–0	Cleveland Municipal Stadium
2	October 18	Boston Shamrocks	L 0–9	1–1	Cleveland Municipal Stadium
3	October 25	New York Yankees	W 27–0	2–1	Cleveland Municipal Stadium
4	October 28	at New York Yankees	T 0–0	2–1–1	Yankee Stadium
5	November 1	Pittsburgh Americans	T 7–7	2–1–2	Cleveland Municipal Stadium
6	November 8	Brooklyn Tigers	W 15–14	3–1–2	Cleveland Municipal Stadium
7	November 11	at Boston Shamrocks	W 34–26	4–1–2	Braves Field
8	November 22	New York Yankees	L 7–15	4–2–2	Cleveland Municipal Stadium
9	November 26	at Rochester Tigers	W 7–6	5–2–2	Red Wing Stadium

== Championship ==
The AFL Championship Game was scratched and the Rams were awarded the Championship as the Boston Shamrocks were unable to field a team due to a players' strike after the Shamrocks failed to make payroll.

Despite this, the Shamrocks, who finished with the best regular season record, are credited as the league champs in various subsequent sources.

== Standings ==
Team	W	L	T
Boston Shamrocks	8	3	0
Cleveland Rams	5	2	2
New York Yankees	5	3	2
Pittsburgh Americans	3	2	1
Syracuse/Rochester Braves	1	6	0
Brooklyn/Rochester Tigers	0	6	1
