= Harry Mattos =

American football player (1911–1992)

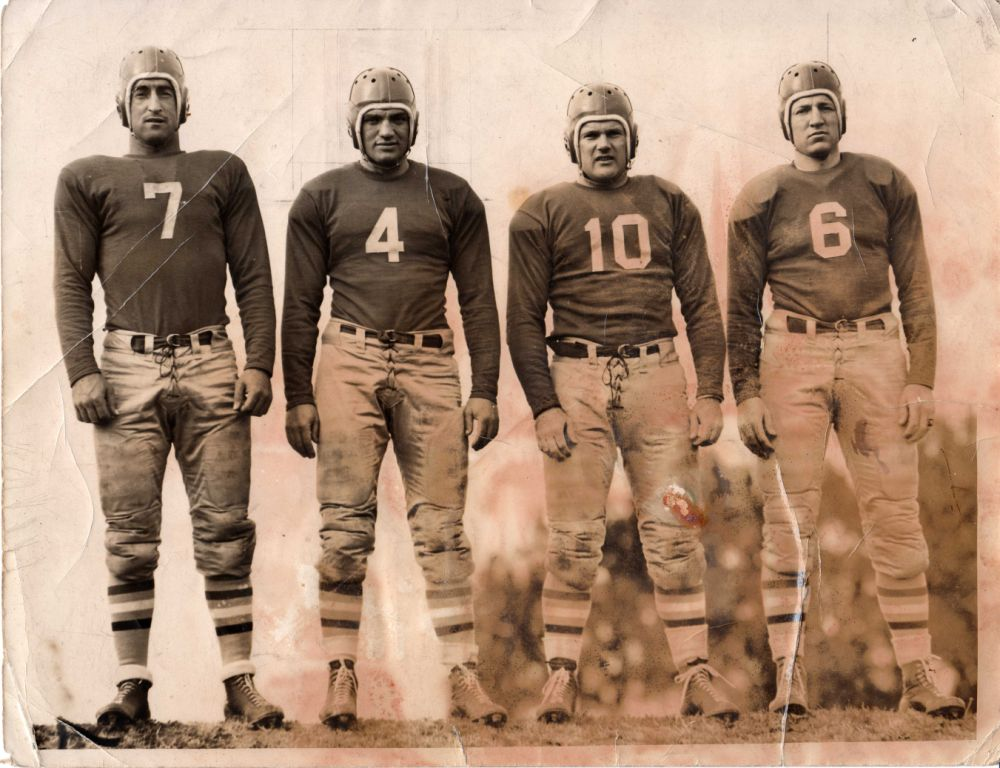
- Mattos (far left) with the remaining Cleveland Rams players that crossed into the NFL with the team: Mike Sebastian, Bud Cooper and Stan Pincura

No. 7
- Positions: Halfback, quarterback, kicker

Personal information
- Born: April 7, 1911; Oakland, California, U.S.
- Died: February 5, 1992 (Age 80); San Jose, California, U.S.
- Listed height: 6 ft 0 in (1.83 m)
- Listed weight: 198 lb (90 kg)

Career information
- High school: Castlemont (CA)
- College: St. Mary's College

Career history
- Hollywood Braves (1935); Green Bay Packers (1936); Cleveland Rams (1936–1937); Cincinnati Bengals (1937); Jersey City Giants (1938–1940); Paterson Panthers (1940–1941); Hollywood Wolves (1944)

Awards and highlights
- NFL champion (1936); First-team All-PCFL (1944); First-team All-AA; Second-team All-AA (1939)
- Stats at Pro Football Reference

Harry Raymond Mattos (April 7, 1911 – February 5, 1992), nicknamed "the Horse" or "the Toe", was an American football halfback in the National Football League (NFL) for the Green Bay Packers and the Cleveland Rams.

== College career ==
Mattos played college football at the St. Mary's College of California. In 1934, he threw for two touchdown passes in a 14–9 win over Fordham University.

== Pro career ==
=== Hollywood Braves ===
After graduating from St. Mary’s in 1935, Mattos signed with the Hollywood Braves of the American Legion League, a professional football league of area Los Angeles teams. With the Braves, Mattos was used mainly as a passer, throwing for two touchdowns in three games before a broken leg ended his season.

=== Cleveland Rams ===
Mattos started the next year in the NFL, with the Green Bay Packers. However, the Packers, with an already solid backfield, dropped him early in the season. As a result, Mattos signed with the Cleveland Rams, who were still members of the second American Football League, a competing major league. The Rams used Mattos as a running back and as a wide receiver and as a kicker, to leading the league in scoring. Mattos kicking ability earned him the nickname "The Toe". He also caught two touchdown catches that season. Mattos helped the Rams battle the Boston Shamrocks for first place in the league, however, the Rams had to settle for a second-place finish. However, Mattos earned the respect of the media. A Boston sportswriter, used a different nickname each time he mentioned Mattos. One such nickname was Harry "Nothing" Mattos.

The Rams moved into the NFL and Mattos went with them. Even though the NFL confederation gave the membership to the same team owner, this NFL franchise officially became a detach entity because only four players of the team joined the NFL that was newly launched. No personnel of the team joined the NFL league. The four players were Mike Sebastian, Stan Pincura, Bud Cooper and Harry Mattos. However, in midseason he went back to the AFL, where he finished the season with the Cincinnati Bengals, doing most of his work as a passer. The AFL folded after the season.

=== Little Giants ===
Mattos then signed on with the New York Giants. However, like with Green Bay, their backfield was already too talented and he was waived just before the season started. Giants founder, Tim Mara, however, sent him to the Giants’ new farm team in Jersey City, where he starred in the backfield with Ken Strong as the Jersey City Giants swept to the American Association title. Mattos was used as a running back, and led the league in touchdown passes and finished second to Strong in the balloting for the team’s MVP, however somehow failed to make the league all-star team.

A year later in 1939, another cut by the Giants resulted in Mattos being sent back to Jersey City. Mattos relinquished his role as a passer and played mostly as a running back. He then made the second all-league team as the Little Giants marched to a 7–3–1 record but failed to repeat as champions. In 1940 Jersey City found itself with an abundance running backs but short of passers. Mattos shifted his role from that of a rusher to a passer.

=== Paterson Panthers ===
The Little Giants got off to a slow start in 1940, and when Ed Danowski was signed by the team, there wasn’t much need for Mattos. As a result, he was traded in midseason to the Paterson Panthers, where he led the team in a late drive that earned them second place, behind the Giants. He finished third in the league in passing yards and earned an honorable mention on the all-star team.

In 1941 Mattos played the full season with Paterson, and led the American Association in completions and passing yardage and made the first all-league team as the Panthers repeated their second-place finish of a year earlier. However manning shortages related to World War II closed down the American Association. Paterson fielded an independent team in 1942, however, Mattos was not among those who turned out.

=== Comeback ===
However, in 1944 he resurfaced with the Hollywood Wolves of the Pacific Coast Football League. A new team formed in the midst of the wartime manpower shortage, the Wolves failed to win a single game. However, Mattos's passing ability earned him a spot on the all-league first-team. By this time Mattos was 33 years old and had not played since 1941.
