= Mike Sebastian =

American football player (1910–1989)

- Sebastian while playing for Pitt

No. 14, 15, 50, 4
- Positions: Halfback, Fullback

Personal information
- Born: June 7, 1910; Luxor, Pennsylvania, U.S.
- Died: June 28, 1989 (aged 79); Hemet, California, U.S.
- Listed height: 5 ft 11 in (1.80 m)
- Listed weight: 185 lb (84 kg)

Career information
- High school: Sharon (PA)
- College: Pittsburgh

Career history

Playing
- 1934: Chicago Cardinals (NFL)
- 1934: Cincinnati Reds (NFL)
- 1935: Boston Redskins (NFL)
- 1935: Philadelphia Eagles (NFL)
- 1935: Pittsburgh Pirates (NFL)
- 1936: Passaic Red Devils (AA)
- 1936: Cleveland Rams (AFL)
- 1937: Cleveland Rams (NFL)
- 1937: Rochester Tigers (AFL)
- 1938: St. Louis Gunners (AFL)

Coaching
- 1938: St. Louis Gunners
- 1946: Rochester High School (assistant)
- 1947–1950: Rochester High School
- 1951–1961: Ambridge High School

Awards and highlights
- 2× All-American (1932–1933); College All-Star Game (1934); East–West Shrine Game (1934); Mercer County (PA) Sports Hall of Fame (2002); Beaver County (PA) Sports Hall of Fame (2007)

Michael John "Lefty" Sebastian (June 7, 1910 – June 28, 1989) was an American football halfback in the National Football League (NFL) for the Cincinnati Reds, Boston Redskins, Philadelphia Eagles, Pittsburgh Pirates, (later renamed the Steelers) and the Cleveland Rams. Nicknamed the Rose of Sharon, he also played for the Rams while they were still members of the second American Football League (AFL) as well as the AFL's Rochester Tigers. Before his professional career, Sebastian played college football at the University of Pittsburgh. At Pitt, he played under coach Jock Sutherland, who had declared Sebastian the best passer that he had seen in "many days."

== Early life ==
Sebastian was born in Luxor, Pennsylvania, a coal-mining "patch town" located near Greensburg. He attended Sharon High School in Sharon, Pennsylvania, where he played football and track and field, earning All-State honors in both sports. In 1928, Sebastian earned national attention when he scored ten touchdowns contributing to 63 points in just one game.

== College career ==
Sebastian earned a scholarship to the University of Pittsburgh, where he again starred in both football and track. He played football as a fullback and helped the 1931 Pittsburgh Panthers football team share the national championship.

On November 5, 1932, Sebastian faked a pass, cut for the west sidelines, reversed his field, for a 45-yard touchdown run against a heavily favored Notre Dame. Pitt won the game 12–0 for the first victory in the rivalry. That same year Sebastian caught a ball for 52 yards in a 0–0 tie against Ohio State. Sportswriter John Dietrich of The Plain Dealer later called the game "one of the thrillers of a lifetime." Sebastian contributed to a hard-fought 19–12 Pitt victory over Penn by catching a 27-yard touchdown pass late in the game.

On October 28, 1933, Sebastian's 75-yard touchdown run highlighted a 14–0 win over Duke. In 1930, and again in 1933, he played in the Rose Bowl, which resulted in a 47–14 and 35–0 losses to the USC Trojans.

In 1934, Sebastian played and was the starting running back in the first College All-Star Game. The game, which became a tradition from 1934 until 1974, was played between the National Football League (NFL) champions and a team of star college seniors from the previous year. That very first game was played on August 31, 1934, before a crowd of 79,432 at Chicago's Soldier Field. The game resulted in a scoreless tie between the all-stars and the Chicago Bears. That year, Sebastian also played in the second East–West Shrine Game in Chicago.

== Professional career ==
After college, Sebastian went on to a pro football career. He began his career with the Cincinnati Reds in 1934, though most sources do not credit him with playing for the team. However, he was signed by the team just before a game against the Chicago Cardinals. He split the 1935 season between three teams: the Boston Redskins, Philadelphia Eagles and the Pittsburgh Pirates. It is not known in what order the teams he played for were in 1935. Some records show that he made his start with the Pirates, but there is also a signed original copy of his contract with the Chicago Cardinals, which offered Sebastian $120 per game (see below); however, there are no existing statistics to prove that he played for Chicago.

In 1936 Sebastian played for the Passaic Red Devils of the minor league American Association. The following year Sebastian returned to the NFL with the Cleveland Rams. The Rams were a charter member of the second American Football League in 1936. Although the NFL granted membership in 1937 to the same owner, the NFL considers it a separate entity since only four of the players (William "Bud" Cooper, Harry "The Horse" Mattos, Stan Pincura, and Sebastian) and none of the team's management made the transfer to the Rams' NFL team. In 1937, Sebastian and Harry Newman were mainstays on the AFL's Rochester Tigers. In 1938, he served a player-coach for the St. Louis Gunners of the American Football League.

Sebastian's career ended due to knee and hip problems, which not only ended his career but would eventually end his life.

=== Rushing stats ===
Team	Year	G	Att	Yds	TD	Y/A	Y/G	A/G
Pittsburgh Pirates; Philadelphia Eagles; Boston Redskins	1935	7	22	79	0	3.6	11.3	3.1
Cleveland Rams	1937	1	6	4	0	0.7	4.0	6.0

=== Receiving stats ===
Team	Year	G	Rec	Yds	Y/R	TD	Lng	Y/G
Pittsburgh Pirates; Philadelphia Eagles; Boston Redskins	1935	7	1	19	19.0	0	19	2.7
Cleveland Rams	1937	0	0	0	0	0.0	0.0	0.0

=== Passing stats ===
Team	Year	G	Cmp	Att	Cmp%	Yds	TD	Int	Lng
Pittsburgh Pirates; Philadelphia Eagles; Boston Redskins	1935	7	1	6	16.7	12	0	1	12

== Coaching career ==
Sebastian retired from playing in 1938 and went back to school to earn a master's degree. He was appointed assistant coach at Rochester Area High School in 1946, with his team going 9–1 that first season. When head coach Earl Ewing resigned, Sebastian was made head coach for the 1947 campaign and made an instant splash with an 8–0–1 team that featured Babe Parilli. He stayed with the Rams three more years, compiling an overall record of 23–12–4.

In 1951, Ambridge High School hired Sebastian as their coach. His first team went 7–1–2, and in 1954, the Bridgers finished with an 8–0–1 record, starting a four-year 31–5–2 run. His 1956 team was 9–0 and outscored its opponents 367–51. Sebastian continued to coach Ambridge through the 1961 season, leading the team to an overall record of 64–38–4. Afterwards, he moved on to New Castle, where he taught classes and coached football before retiring in 1974.

== Later life and honors ==
Sebastian retired to Hemet, California, where he remained active playing golf and other activities. However, his inability to stay active due to pain in his hip made him decide to get hip replacement surgery. He died on June 28, 1989, as a result of hepatitis contracted during the procedure. He was 79 years old.

In 2002, Sebastian was inducted into the Mercer County Sports Hall of Fame. Then, in 2007, Sebastian was inducted into Beaver County's Sports Hall of Fame.

== Personal ==
Sebastian married Genevieve Micko on March 3, 1934. He is interred in Sharon along with his wife, who passed away in January 2005. She was 89 years old.

c.1933 Sebastian playing at Pitt

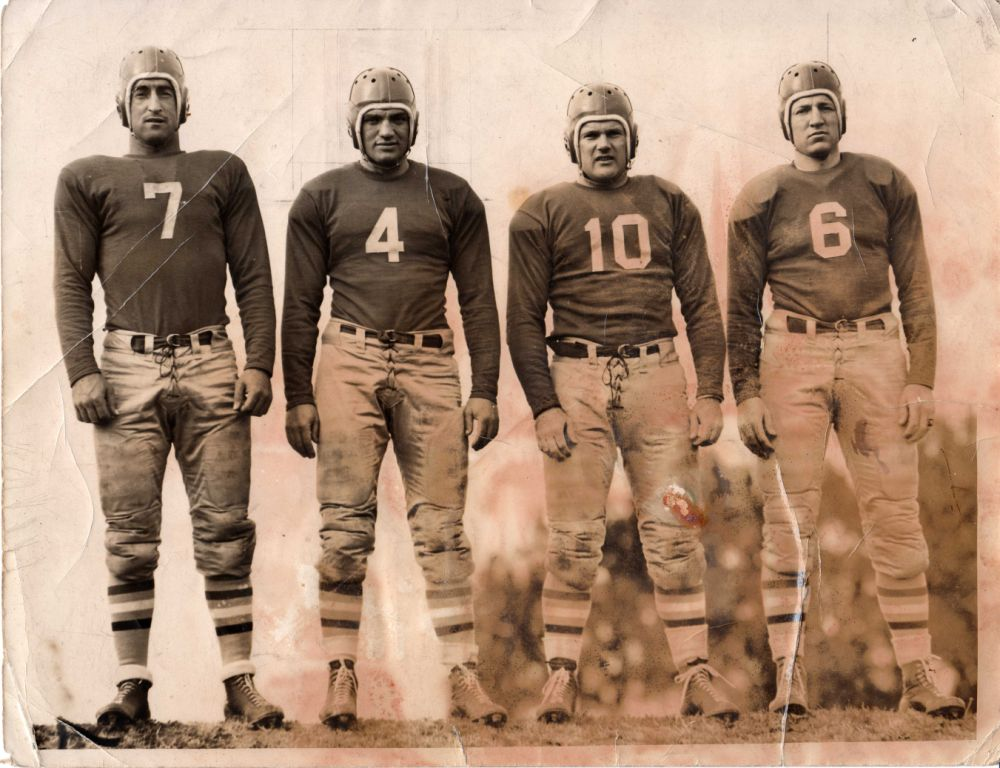
1936 Harry Mattos, Sebastian, Bud Cooper and Stan Pincura: The only AFL Cleveland Rams players that moved with the franchise to the NFL

c.1938 Sebastian as a minor league football player-coach
