= Amerks (disambiguation) =

Amerks is a nickname for the following sports teams:

- New York Americans, later Brooklyn Americans, played in the National Hockey League 1925 to 1942
- Rochester Americans, have played in the American Hockey League since 1956
- Pittsburgh Americans, played in the American Football League from 1936 to 1937

== See also ==
- Americans (disambiguation)
