= Elvin Hutchison =

American football player and official (1912–2001)

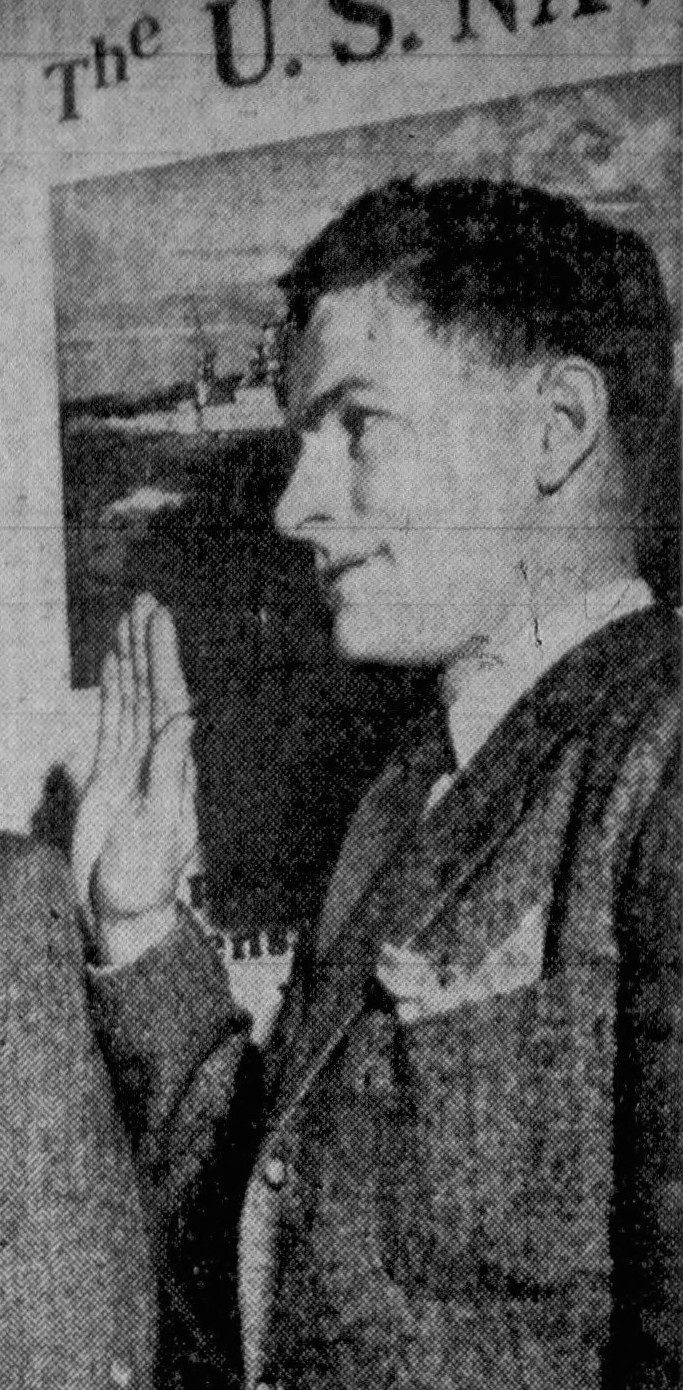
- Hutchison swearing into the United States Navy in 1942

No. 21
- Positions: Halfback, quarterback

Personal information
- Born: October 14, 1912; Guthrie Center, Iowa, U.S.
- Died: May 24, 2001 (aged 88)
- Listed height: 6 ft 0 in (1.83 m)
- Listed weight: 195 lb (88 kg)

Career information
- High school: Red Oak (Red Oak, Iowa)
- College: Whittier

Career history

Playing
- Los Angeles Bulldogs (1938); Detroit Lions (1939); Los Angeles Bulldogs (1939–1941); Los Angeles Bulldogs (1946)

Coaching
- Citrus (1940–1941) Head coach; Doane (1943) Assistant coach; Burbank HS (CA) (1947) Head coach
- Stats at Pro Football Reference

Elvin Clarence Hutchison (October 14, 1912 – May 24, 2001, often misspelled as Hutchinson) was an American football player, coach, and official. He played professionally as a halfback with the Detroit Lions of the National Football League (NFL) in 1939 and the Los Angeles Bulldogs of the Pacific Coast Professional Football League (PCPFL) between 1938 and 1946. Hutchison served as the head football coach at Citrus College in Glendora, California from 1940 to 1941. He officiated the NFL from 1952 to 1959 and in the American Football League (NFL) from 1960 to 1969.

== Early life and education ==
Hutchison was born October 14, 1912, in Guthrie Center, Iowa. He graduated from Red Oak High School in Red Oak, Iowa and went on to Whittier College, where he played football as a quarterback and known as the "Red Oak Express" the football team before graduating in 1937. Hutchison later earned a Master of Education from the University of Southern California (USC) in 1948.

== Career ==
Following his collegiate football career, Hutchison played professionally as a halfback for the Detroit Lions of the National Football League (NFL) in 1939, and as a wingback for the Los Angeles Bulldogs of the Pacific Coast Professional Football League (PCPFL) from 1939 to 1946.

In 1940, Hutchison was hired at Citrus College in Glendora, California as head coach in football and basketball and mathematics instructor. He left Citrus in 1942 to enlist in the physical educator corps of the United States Navy and was assigned to Naval Station Norfolk in Norfolk, Virginia. Hutchison was an assistant football coach and chief petty officer at Doane College in Crete, Nebraska before earning a commission in the U.S. Navy as a lieutenant (junior grade) in 1944.

Hutchison coached football at Burbank High School, in Burbank, California, in 1947. He officiated in the NFL from 1952 through 1959, and in the American Football League for its entire existence, from 1960 through 1969. In 1959, Hutchison was named principal of Kaiser Junior High School in Costa Mesa, California.

== Family and death ==
Hutchison married Lois Evelyn Walters in May 1943. They had two daughters, Sandra and Sharon.

Hutchison died on May 24, 2001.

== Awards ==
- Whittier College Athletic Hall of Fame
