= Los Angeles Bulldogs =

1936–1948 American football team

Logo

General information
- Founded: 1936
- Folded: 1948
- Stadium: Gilmore Stadium (Los Angeles) (1936–46); Veterans Memorial Stadium (Long Beach) (1947)
- Headquartered: Los Angeles, California and Long Beach, California, United States
- Colors: Dark Blue, Orange
- Mascot: bulldog

Personnel
- Owners: Los Angeles region chapter American Legion (1936–37); Jerry Corcoran (1938–48)
- General manager: Harry Myers
- Head coach: Gus Henderson (1936–37); Ike Frankian (1938–48); Bill Sargent (1945–46)

Team history
- Los Angeles Bulldogs (1936–47); Long Beach Bulldogs (1948)

League / conference affiliations
- Independent (1936, 1938); American Football League (1937); American Football League (1938) / American Professional Football Association (1939); Pacific Coast Professional Football League (1939–48)

Championships
- League Championships: 4 AFL 1937, APFA 1939, PCPFL 1940, PCPFL 1946

The Los Angeles Bulldogs were a professional American football team that competed from 1936 to 1948 (the last year as the Long Beach Bulldogs). Formed with the intention of joining the National Football League in 1937 (and turned down in favor of the Cleveland Rams), the Bulldogs were the first team on the major league level to play its home games on the American West Coast (the NFL's Los Angeles Buccaneers and the first AFL's Wildcats of 1926 were actually traveling teams based in Chicago). They were considered "the best football team in existence outside the NFL".

The 1937 Bulldogs are one of three pro football teams that have gone undefeated and untied during a season, joining the 1972 Miami Dolphins (17–0–0, NFL), and the 1948 Cleveland Browns (15–0–0, AAFC). The Bulldogs hold the distinction of being the first.

The Bulldogs joined the second American Football League, in 1937 and proceeded to become the first professional football team to win a league championship with a perfect record (no losses or ties), having won all eight of its league games that season (counting all exhibition games, they won all 16 of their 1937 contests). After the dissolution of the second AFL after the 1937 season, they returned to independent football for 1938, having a 2–1–2 record against NFL teams that season.

For the 1939 season, the Bulldogs joined fellow second AFL franchise Cincinnati Bengals in joining another American Football League just before the league changed its name to the American Professional Football League. The two newcomers dominated their new league, finishing with the two greatest winning percentages, but at the league meetings, the Columbus Bullies were announced as the league champions. Shortly afterward, the Bulldogs announced their intention to leave the AFL to become a charter member of a new Pacific Coast Professional Football League (the AFL soon dissipated when three more member teams defected to a new league, which soon became the “third American Football League”).

Winning PCPFL championships in 1940 and 1946, the Bulldogs were the only team to compete in the league in every year of its existence (1940–1948). With the establishment of the Los Angeles Rams in the NFL and Los Angeles Dons in the All-America Football Conference in 1946, the popularity of the Bulldogs diminished to the point of moving their home games from Gilmore Stadium to Veterans Memorial Stadium in Long Beach in 1948, and when the attendance dropped below 1,000 people per game, the Bulldogs – and the PCPFL – folded.

== Team origin ==
The Los Angeles Bulldogs were formed in 1936 to join the National Football League. After failed professional football leagues on the American West Coast (the Pacific Coast League of 1926 and 1934 and the American Legion Pro Football League in 1935), the Los Angeles regional chapter of the American Legion hired Harry Myers and allocated $10,000 to assemble a team following a probationary NFL franchise grant. Myers’ first hire was Gus Henderson as head coach, and they signed players with NFL experience, including lineman Ray Richards (Chicago Bears), end Ike Frankian (New York Giants), and University of Tulsa alumni Roy Berry, Hal Wickersham, Frank Greene, and Homer Reynolds.

In their inaugural 1936 season, Gil Lefebvre stood out as a punt return threat, while Berry and Ed Stark impressed crowds with long runs. Unlike typical traveling teams, the Bulldogs played all games at the 18,000-seat Gilmore Stadium. Six contests involved NFL teams—the Bulldogs beat the Chicago Cardinals, Pittsburgh Pirates, and Philadelphia Eagles, tied the Brooklyn Dodgers, and were shut out by the Chicago Bears and NFL champion Green Bay Packers—finishing 6–3–1 with an average attendance of 9,400, rising above 12,000 in the season’s second half.

At the 1936 NFL owners’ meeting, Myers joined representatives from Houston and Cleveland to pitch their teams for expansion. Despite a probationary franchise and implied promise, the NFL chose Homer Marshman’s Cleveland Rams, second-place finishers in the second AFL. The Bulldogs then opted to take the Rams’ place in the AFL.

== 1937 in the American Football League ==
Despite the new league, the Los Angeles Bulldogs' roster stayed relatively constant. Former Chicago Cardinals back Al Nichelini joined the team. Back Bill Howard led the league in scoring as the Bulldogs marched through the American Football League’s schedule, being the first professional football team to win all their contests and win the league championship in the same season.

=== The perfect season: 1937 (8–0–0 AFL, 16–0–0 total) ===
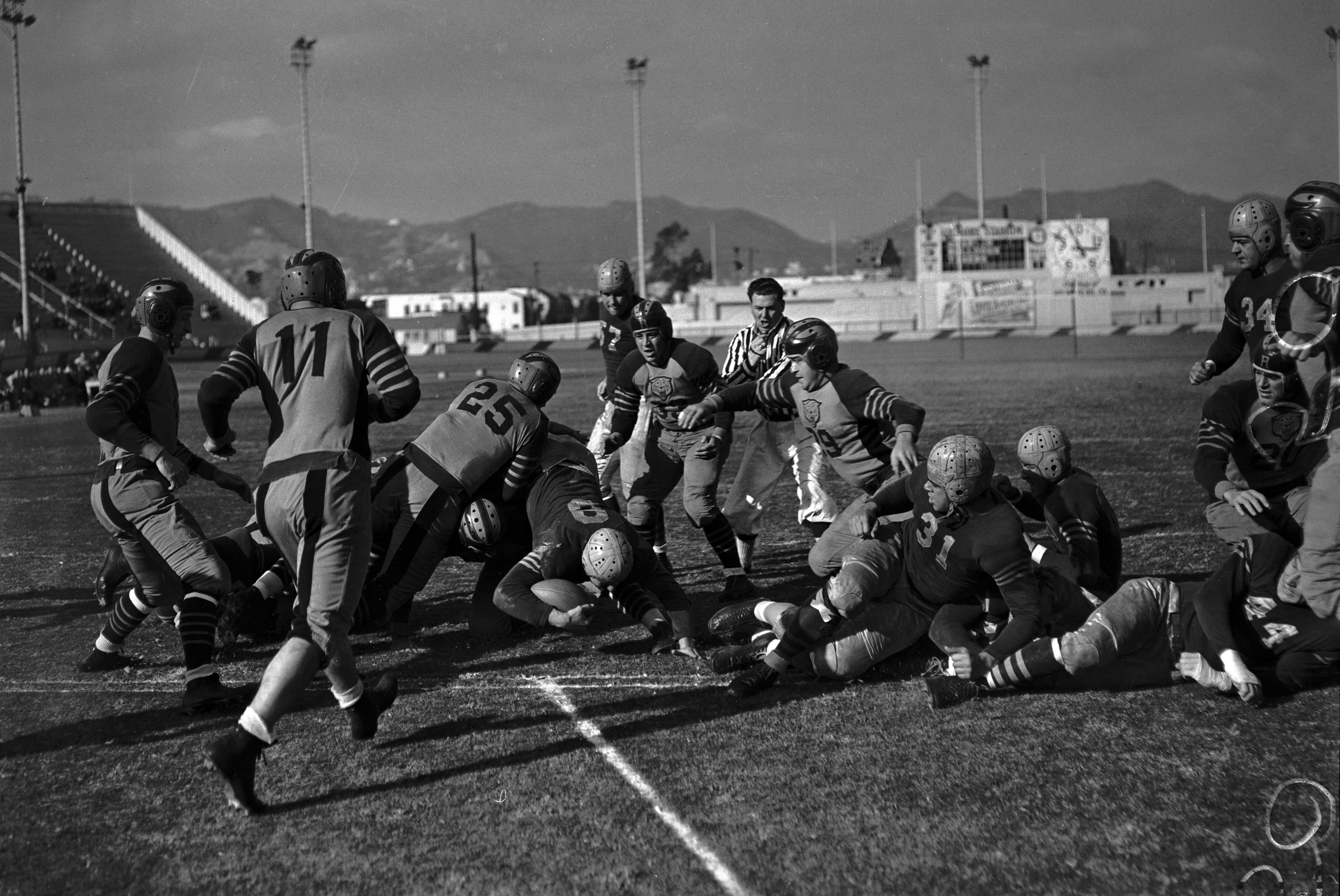
Bulldogs (dark uniforms) vs Rochester Tigers, November 14, 1937

Home games are in CAPITAL letters; AFL games are in bold print

Date	Opponent	Score
Sep 10	**Pittsburgh Americans**	**21–0**
Sep 22	**New York Yankees**	**27–6**
Oct 3	**Rochester Tigers**	**20–9**
Oct 13	**Boston Shamrocks**	**14–0**
Oct 14	Providence Steam Roller	13–7
Oct 17	Bristol West Ends	28–7
Oct 24	**Cincinnati Bengals**	**17–7**
Nov 7	SALINAS PACKERS	13–0
Nov 14	**ROCHESTER TIGERS**	**48–21**
Nov 21	**BOSTON SHAMROCKS**	**45–26**
Nov 25	**NEW YORK YANKEES**	**27–0**
Dec 5	Salinas Packers	17–14
Dec 12	**CINCINNATI BENGALS**	**14–3**
Dec 19	SALINAS PACKERS	21–3
Dec 26	COAST ALL-STARS	7–3
Jan 2	COAST ALL-STARS	13–10

The scheduling plan adopted by the AFL and the Bulldogs as a cost containment measure helped the league inch toward its demise as the Bulldogs overwhelmed the rest of the league in the first half of the season and completed its perfect season at home in the second half. The Shamrocks and Yankees, both of which averaging over 10,000 attendance in home games in the 1936 season, totaled 4500 people in their home games against the Bulldogs in 1937. On the other hand, the Bulldogs drew 15,000 in each of their AFL home games and became the only AFL team to make a profit in the 1937 season. The league folded in 1938.

== 1938 and 1939 ==
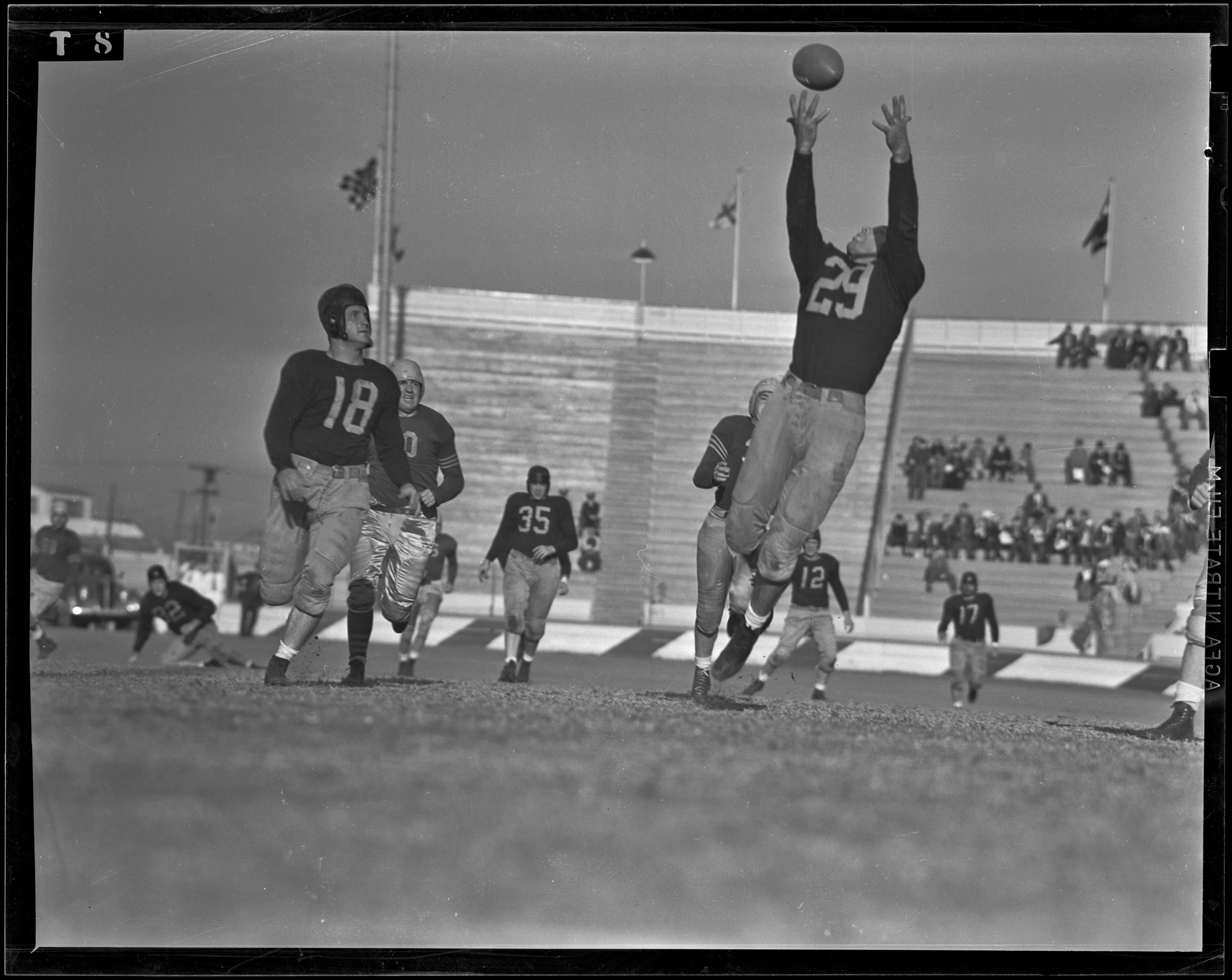
Bulldogs playing the Cleveland Rams with Bulldog player (#29, presumably Howie Tipton) swatting at a pass at Gilmore Stadium, Los Angeles on November 20, 1938

With the collapse of the second American Football League, playing games against NFL teams became an option for the Bulldogs again for 1938 as they returned to independent status. The season featured games against the Pittsburgh Pirates, both Chicago NFL teams, and the Cleveland Rams, plus two games against former AFL franchise Cincinnati. The Bulldogs were asked by Hollywood Stars owner Paul Schissler to join his new California League as a rival to his team, but Myers declined the offer, dooming the league.

Program for the Bulldogs' Sept. 4, 1939, game against the Washington Redskins.

The Bulldogs followed their perfect season with a 10–2–2 campaign, including a 2–1–2 record in games against NFL teams (the Chicago teams in Charleston, West Virginia, the Pittsburgh Pirates in Colorado Springs, Colorado, and home games against the Pirates and the Rams). LA’s other loss was to the Bengals, which also had success against the NFL teams after the dissolution of the second AFL.

The following year featured several changes for the Bulldogs, most notably a new owner (Jerry Corcoran), a new league (another American Football League, soon to change its name to the American Professional Football Association), and a new head coach (Ike Frankian replacing Gus Henderson). Kicker George Karamatic was signed from the Washington Redskins, and they lost their star of their backfield Bill Howard.

After losing their opening game to the Redskins and being shut out in their opening APFA game by the Columbus Bullies, the Bulldogs found their stride in the new league, including beating their old nemesis Cincinnati Bengals once and Columbus thrice. As the season progressed, their offense strengthened as they beat the Dayton Bombers 65–0 on Thanksgiving weekend and the St. Louis Gunners 56–14 in mid-December. As the season ended, the Bulldogs’ 7–1 (.875) record had them placed atop the league standings, ahead of Cincinnati’s 6–2 (.750) and Columbus’ 9–4 (.692). Yet in a league meeting on January 7, 1940, Columbus was declared the league champion, with a 9–2 (.818) record.

Shortly afterward, Jerry Corcoran and Paul Schlissler announced the formation of the Pacific Coast Professional Football League as the APFA announced its intentions to become a major professional football league. With the departure of the Bulldogs to the new PCPFL and the defection of Cincinnati, Columbus, and a new Milwaukee AFPA team to a new East Coast-based league, the old AFL was fatally split and dissipated as two other AFPA teams’ applications to the new American Football League were eventually turned down.

== The Pacific Coast Professional Football League ==
=== 1940–1942 ===
From the beginning, the PCPFL became a showcase for the Bulldogs and Schissler’s (newly renamed) Hollywood Bears as the league did something that the NFL did not do at the time: employ African American players. While the Bears featured the talents of Kenny Washington, Woody Strode, and Kink Richards, the Bulldogs relied upon local talent as well (including, briefly, in 1941, a UCLA Bruin who lettered in four sports: Jackie Robinson). The availability of Washington to the Bears determined the league championship in 1940 and 1941 as he was injured for a Bruins-Bulldogs game that resulted in Los Angeles winning the championship with a 7–2–1 record; a healthy Washington powered Hollywood’s undefeated romp through the schedule the following year (including three defeats of the Bulldogs as LA finished in second place with a 4–4 record). It did not matter at the time that the league would end the 1941 season two weeks early because of the attack on Pearl Harbor and the U. S. military’s ongoing fear of a possible Japanese attack on the American West Coast.

Unlike the Dixie League, the American Association, and the third American Football League, the PCPFL joined the NFL in continuing its competition in the World War II years of 1941–1945. The league schedule was pared as Paul Schissler entered military service and wound up coaching the Santa Ana Flyers, a service team coached by former Bulldog Garrett Arbelbide competed against the PCPFL teams in addition to March Field, another service team. Schissler’s Bears, handicapped by the absence of their owner-coach and the unavailability of Kenny Washington, went winless in league play under interim player-coach Kink Richards. The Bulldogs didn’t fare much better, finishing third in the four-team league at 2–2, behind the 4–1 of charter members San Diego Bombers and the 2–1 of the San Francisco Bay Bombers. While the Bombers officially won the 1942 league championship, they lost two games to the March Field Flyers, who were undefeated in five games against league membership.

While the league membership profited at the box office with the games with the service academies, the owners decided that it would be in the league’s best interests not to be overshadowed by the military teams; so the games with March Field and Santa Ana were dropped. It was first of several changes of the PCPFL for 1943, some involving the Los Angeles Bulldogs.

=== 1943–1945 ===
The league expanded from four to eight teams, with the return of the Oakland Giants after a two-season absence, and the addition of the Richmond Boilermakers (who dropped out midway through league play), the Alameda Mustangs (who moved to San Jose in 1944), and the Los Angeles Mustangs resulted in the league having four Los Angeles teams for competition, with one in particular creating controversy and bitter feelings for succeeding years.

Almost immediately after being granted an expansion franchise for the Los Angeles Mustangs, owner Bill Freelove surprised the league membership by signing virtually the entire roster of the 1942 Los Angeles Bulldogs. Bulldogs owner Jerry Corcoran was contemplating the suspension of the team for 1943 when the league gave a “leave of absence” to the Hollywood Bears, whose owner and star were both unavailable for competition. As a result, Corcoran was able to sign most of the Bears (including Kink Richards), and the Bulldogs had the manpower to participate in the 1943 PCPFL season. The reconstituted team finished in fifth place with a 3–4 record, one win behind Freelove’s Mustangs (4–4), which finished in a tie for second with Oakland. The San Diego Bombers won its second consecutive league title with a 7–1 record.

After the end of the 1943 season, the off-the-field fireworks continued. The league ownership registered their disapproval of Bill Freelove’s raiding of the Bulldogs by refusing to renew his league membership. Freelove responded with the formation of a new American Football League with eight teams from Seattle and Portland to San Diego. As a result, there were an unprecedented five Los Angeles professional football teams operating simultaneously. With the leagues’ talent pool greatly diluted, the Bulldogs struggled to a 2–5 record, good for sixth place in the PCPFL (and only better than the new Hollywood Wolves) as the San Diego Bombers won their third straight league title.

On December 21, 1944, the AFL merged with the PCPFL, with the AFL’s first and second place teams (Hollywood Rangers and San Francisco Clippers) replacing the Wolves and the Packers for the 1945 season. Freelove’s Mustangs were not permitted to join the reformed league and had a short, futile “life” as an independent team. With the return of Paul Schissler and Kenny Washington, the Bears were back, but the Rangers quit the league rather than join forces with the other team from Hollywood (tailback Dean McAdams left the Rangers and signed with the Bulldogs soon afterward). Helped by the defection, the Bulldogs improved to 5–5–1 with the help of a newly signed quarterback, Frankie Albert. The Bulldogs finished in third place, behind a resuscitated Hollywood Bears team (8–2–1) and the Oakland Giants (7–2) led by league MVP Mel Reid, another victim of the NFL color line.

Seven years after playing in front of crowds of 15,000 people as they marched through a perfect season in the major league American Football League, the Bulldogs were averaging less than 10,000 per game in Gilmore Stadium in the Pacific Coast Professional Football League’s last season as the highest level league on the West Coast. While the Bulldogs have one more league championship in the post-World War II years, the anticipated arrival of the Cleveland Rams into Los Angeles heralded seismic changes in the professional football landscape in California.

=== 1946 ===
In 1946, the Bulldogs, which were founded with the intention of joining the National Football League, found themselves competing against the team that entered the NFL in their stead in 1937 – and with the formation of the Los Angeles Dons of the new All-America Football Conference, the Bulldogs suddenly found themselves third in the Los Angeles pecking order as both the Rams and the Dons started to draw upwards of 40,000 people in the Los Angeles Memorial Coliseum.

While the PCPFL was suddenly diminished in stature with the incursion of the two major leagues into California, the six-year-old league underwent a few changes as it expanded to nine teams and divided into two divisions. Teams based in Honolulu, Salt Lake City, Sacramento, and Tacoma, Washington. Team rosters were limited to 25 players, and, for the first time, all league games were to be played on Sunday. The league – along with the Dixie League and the newly resuscitated American Association (which changed its name to the American Football League for the 1946 season) - entered into a working arrangement with the NFL, agreeing to being, in essence, a farm league to the “big boys” and not allowing any participants in “any outlaw league” (specifically the AAFC) to be a member of any PCPFL team.

The 1946 Bulldogs had 11 players on its roster who had NFL experience., including former Detroit Lions halfback Joe Margucci, lineman Forrest McPherson, and wingback Elvin Hutchison. While the Bulldogs won the Southern Division handily (the Bulldogs’ 9–2–1 vs. the second place Hawaiian Warriors’ 8–4), the Northern Division title was decided by a forfeit in the last game of the season, ironically one involving the Bulldogs.

The San Francisco Clippers apparently defeated Los Angeles by a score of 24–19 and claimed the top spot in the North. When Clippers owner Frank Ciraolo entered his team’s locker room to participate in the victory celebration, he noticed that John Woudenberg, tackle for the AAFC’s San Francisco 49ers, was wearing a uniform that was assigned to the Clippers’ Courtney Thorell. After the “discrepancy” was reported to league officials, the game was declared a 1–0 forfeit to the Bulldogs. As a result, the Northern Division champions were the Tacoma Indians.

The Bulldogs defeated Tacoma in the league championship game, 38–7, on January 19, 1947. The game was played in Gilmore Stadium in front of only 5200 fans. It was the last game of the Indians’ existence, and an indication of the decline of the Bulldogs as a box office draw in Los Angeles.

=== 1947–1948 ===
As the Bulldogs prepared to defend their second PCPFL title (their first since 1940), the league was starting to come apart at the seams in 1947. The runners-up of 1946 (Tacoma) was gone, as were longtime league members Hollywood, San Diego, and Oakland. The emerging Hawaiian Warriors played all their games in Honolulu, depriving the mainlanders an opportunity of playing them in front of a home crowd, and competition from the Dons and the Rams are proving too much for owner Jerry Corcoran, who eventually sold the Bulldogs as he was drowning in red ink. After LA’s 35–34 victory over the Warriors put the two teams in a virtual tie for first place, the Hawaiians won the rematch (and the league championship) 7–6 later in the week.

While it did not involve the Bulldogs, a gambling scandal involving the Hawaiians further reduced whatever fan interest remained for the PCPFL. Fourteen Hawaiian Warriors were suspended, either “permanently” or “indefinitely,” for their part in the scandal. With the departure of Salt Lake and Sacramento after the end of the 1947, the viability of the league was in doubt as only three teams remained.

Former Bulldogs owner Jerry Corcoran, who co-founded the league in 1940, managed a revived Hollywood Bears team in 1948. The Bears, charter members of the PCPFL, rejoined the league as a traveling team. The Bulldogs, under new management, moved their home games to Long Beach, CA, where they played their only home game at Wilson High School's Stephen's Field on October 17, 1948, defeating the Hollywood Bears, 21–7 [Ref. at newspaperarchive.com, Long Beach Press-Telegram 10/18/1948, Page A-15]. After playing all of their scheduled road games and the one home game, the Bulldogs were one game behind the Hawaiians, who clinched a tie for the league title with a 5–1 record. The Bulldogs had a 3–1 record and could tie the Warriors if they beat San Francisco and Hollywood in Long Beach, but after drawing only 850 in their first home game, the Bulldogs did not try to play the two rescheduled games, cancelling them instead. The existence of the Bulldogs came to an end; the PCPFL succumbed before the beginning of the 1949 season.

==== LA Bulldogs season by season ====
Year	W	L	T	Finish
1936	6	3	1	Independent
1937	8	0	0	1st (AFL)
1938	10	2	2	Independent
1939	8	1	0	1st (APFA)
1940	7	2	1	1st (PCPFL)
1941	4	4	0	2nd (PCPFL)
1942	2	2	0	3rd (PCPFL)
1943	3	4	0	5th (PCPFL)
1944	2	5	0	5th (PCPFL)
1945	5	5	1	3rd (PCPFL)
1946	9	2	1	1st (PCPFL South) – PCPFL champions
1947	5	3	0	2nd (PCPFL)
1948	3	1	0	2nd (PCPFL) – as Long Beach Bulldogs
