= Pittsburgh Americans =

Professional American football team from 1936 to 1937

General information
- Founded: 1936
- Folded: 1937
- Stadium: Forbes Field
- Headquartered: Pittsburgh, Pennsylvania, United States
- Colors: Red, White, Blue

Personnel
- Owner: Richard Guy
- Head coach: Jess Quatse (1937); Rudy Comstock (1936)

Team history
- Pittsburgh Americans (1936–37)

League / conference affiliations
- American Football League II

The Pittsburgh Americans or Pittsburgh Amerks were a professional American football team based in Pittsburgh, Pennsylvania from 1936 until 1937. The team was a member of the major-league American Football League and participated in the league's 1936 and 1937 seasons.

== History ==
When plans for the league were announced on November 12, 1935, fifteen cities bid for charter franchises for the new league. On April 11, 1936, Pittsburgh and seven other cities were awarded franchises. The Americans were organized by Dick Guy, a sports editor and business manager for the then-Pittsburgh Pirates of the National Football League. Rudy Comstock who played for five teams in the NFL, was then named the team's coach. The Amerks played all of their home games at Pittsburgh's Forbes Field. The team was to have played at Duquesne University; however, the deal to lease the school's facilities fell through. The Amerks were able to purchase a lighting system from a circus.

The Amerks' first-ever league game was played on October 4, 1936 against the Syracuse Braves at MacArthur Stadium. Pittsburgh rallied to win the game 27-16. The team's first season resulted in a winning record and a fourth-place finish for the Americans with a record of 3-2-1. The Americans were also not without stars: they signed former Pittsburgh Pirates' Ben Smith and Loran Ribble. However, the team's performance on the field didn't mirror that of ticket sales and attendance. The Americans finished last in the league for attendance, averaging only 2500 spectators in attendance for home games at Forbes Field. However, the team drew large crowds on the road against the New York Yankees, Rochester Tigers and Boston Shamrocks.

While the Americans survived their first season, the team was folded after the third game of the 1937 season. The team played its first game at Forbes Field against the Los Angeles Bulldogs, which resulted in a 21-0 Bulldogs win. Jess Quatse, a former stand-out for the Pitt Panthers, served as the team's coach. The rest of the league would cease operations at the end of season.

== See also ==
- 1936 Pittsburgh Americans season
- 1937 Pittsburgh Americans season
