= Bud Cooper =

American football player (1913–1998)

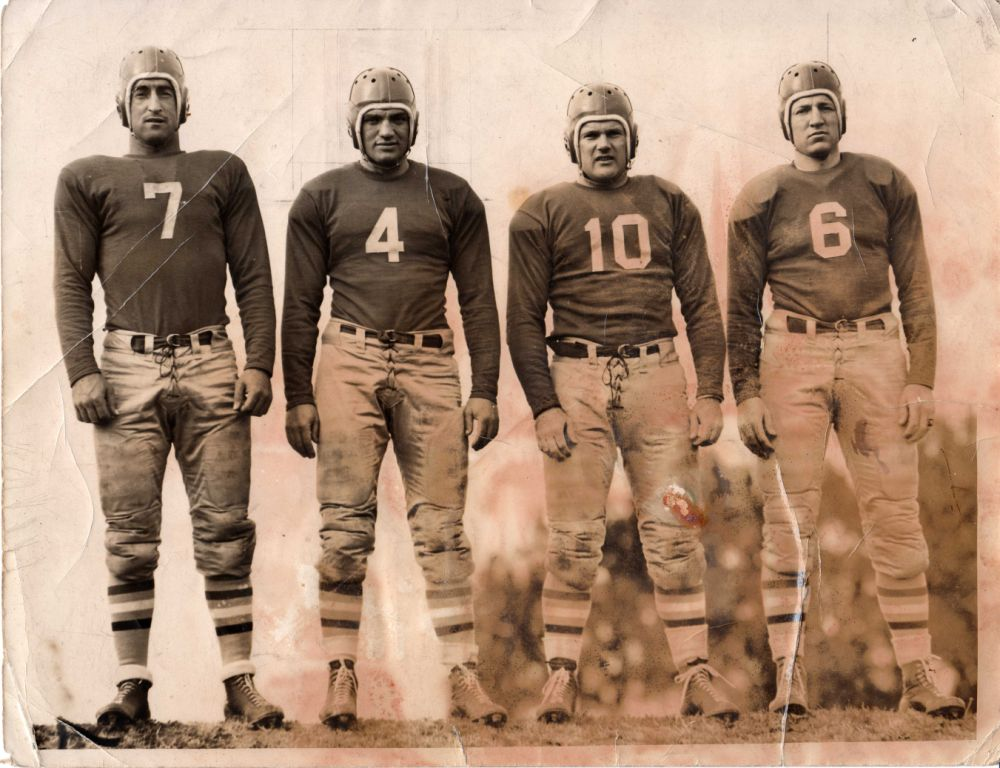
- Cooper (far right) with the original Cleveland Rams players: Harry Mattos Mike Sebastian, and Stan Pincura

No. 6
- Position: Fullback

Personal information
- Born: April 14, 1913; Buffalo, New York, U.S.
- Died: August 11, 1998 (aged 85); Dallas, Pennsylvania, U.S.
- Listed height: 6 ft 1 in (1.85 m)
- Listed weight: 204 lb (93 kg)

Career information
- High school: Milton (PA)
- College: Penn State

Career history
- Cleveland Rams (1936–1937)
- Stats at Pro Football Reference

William Gordon "Bud" Cooper (April 14, 1913 – August 11, 1998) was an American gridiron football player. He played college football at Penn State for the Penn State Nittany Lions football team. After college in 1936 he became a fullback in the National Football League (NFL) for the Cleveland Rams, who the played in the second American Football League (AFL). When the Rams moved into the NFL in 1937, and Cooper went with them. Even though the NFL confederation gave the membership to the same team owner, this NFL franchise officially became a detach entity because only four players of the team joined the NFL that was newly launched. No personnel of the team joined the NFL league. The four players were Mike Sebastian, Stan Pincura, Harry Mattos, and Bud Cooper.
