= Stan Pincura =

American football player (1913–1979)

Bud Cooper
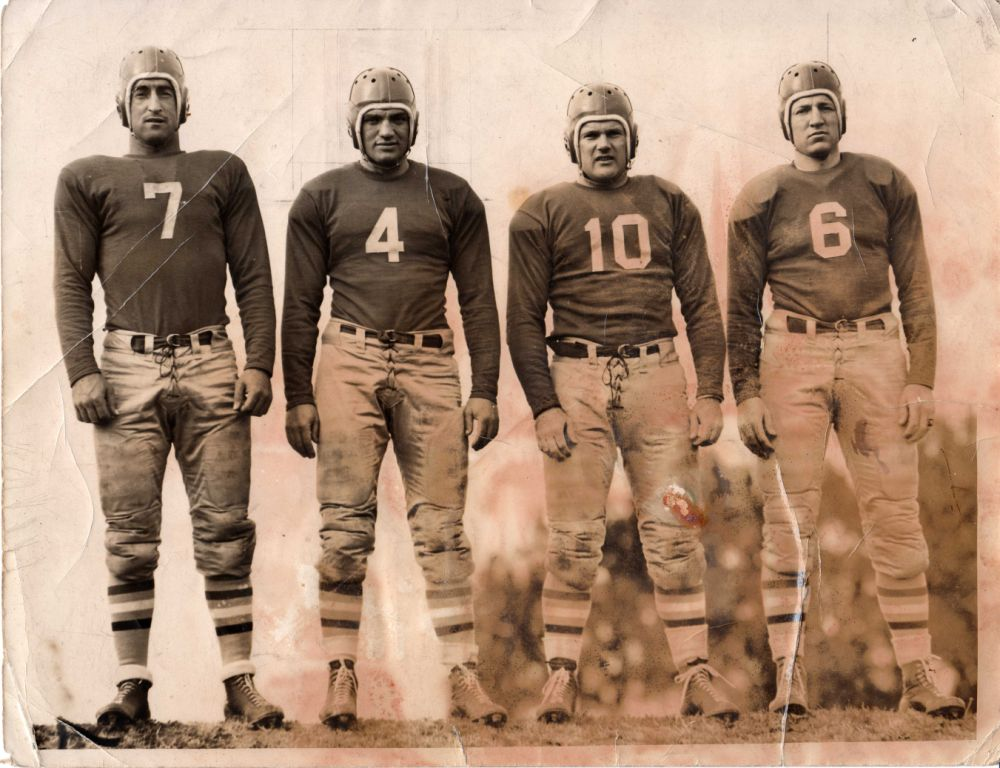
- Pincura (second from right) with the remaining Cleveland Rams players that crossed into the NFL with the team: Harry Mattos, Mike Sebastian and Bud Cooper

No. 10
- Positions: Halfback, quarterback

Personal information
- Born: May 2, 1913; Lorain, Ohio, U.S.
- Died: February 12, 1979 (aged 65); Lorain, Ohio, U.S.
- Listed height: 5 ft 11 in (1.80 m)
- Listed weight: 175 lb (79 kg)

Career information
- College: Ohio State

Career history
- Cleveland Rams (1936–1938)

Awards and highlights
- Second-team All-Big Ten (1935)

Stan Pincura (May 2, 1913 – February 12, 1979) was an American football back in the National Football League (NFL) for the Cleveland Rams. He played college football at the Ohio State University. Pincura was born in Lorain, Ohio. After high school, Pincura attended Ohio State. Pincura made his professional debut in the second American Football League (AFL) in 1936 with the Cleveland Rams.

For the 1937 season the Rams moved into the NFL, and Pincura went with them. Even though the NFL confederation gave the membership to the same team owner, this NFL franchise officially became a detach entity because only four players of the team joined the NFL that was newly launched. No personnel of the team joined the NFL league. The four players were Mike Sebastian, Harry Mattos, Bud Cooper and Stan Pincura. Stan played for the Cleveland Rams for his entire two-year career.
