= Steve Sundra =

American baseball player (1910–1952)

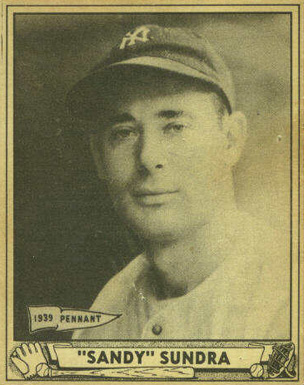
- Pitcher
- Born: March 27, 1910; Luxor, Pennsylvania, U.S.
- Died: March 23, 1952 (aged 41); Cleveland, Ohio, U.S.
- Batted: Right Threw: Right

MLB debut
- April 17, 1936, for the New York Yankees

Last MLB appearance
- May 28, 1946, for the St. Louis Browns

MLB statistics
- Win–loss record: 56–41
- Earned run average: 4.17
- Strikeouts: 214
- Stats at Baseball Reference

Teams
- New York Yankees (1936, 1938–1940); Washington Senators (1941–1942); St. Louis Browns (1942–1944, 1946)

Career highlights and awards
- World Series champion (1939)

Stephen Richard Sundra (March 27, 1910 – March 23, 1952) was an American pitcher in Major League Baseball who played during eight seasons for the New York Yankees (1936; 1938–1940), Washington Senators (1941–1942) and St. Louis Browns (1942–1944; 1946). He batted and threw right-handed.

== Career ==
A native of Luxor, Pennsylvania, Steve Sundra was the son of a Czech coal miner. The family moved to Cleveland, Ohio, when he was 16 and Sundra starred in sandlot ball there. He was signed by the Cleveland Indians and made his pro debut in 1932, moving up to Toledo in 1934. Cleveland optioned Sundra to Minneapolis and Newark in 1935, and the Yankees obtained him in a three-pitcher deal in December, along with Monte Pearson, in exchange for Johnny Allen. His career in the American League ran from 1936 to early in 1946, with time out for 1944–1945 United States Army service during World War II.

In 1936, Sundra posted a 12–9 record for the Newark Bears, leading the International League with a 2.84 earned run average. After one relief appearance for the Yankees in April 1936, he was optioned back to Newark. The Bears won the IL championship with a 109–43 mark, and Sundra went 15–4, ranking eighth in the league in ERA (3.09), and was selected for the All-Star Game.

Sundra was a member of the World Champion Yankees in 1938. He won his last four starts during the regular season, then ran off 11 straight victories (three in relief) for the 1939 AL pennant-winners before losing his last start of the season. He appeared in Game Four of the 1939 World Series, pitching 2.2 innings of relief, allowing 4 hits, 3 runs, all unearned, 1 walk and striking out 2.

In 1940 Sundra faded, going 4–6, and the next year was sold to the Washington Senators, who in turn sent him to the St. Louis Browns in the 1942 midseason. He won 15 games in 1943, then in 1944, began the year with two complete game victories for the pennant-bound Browns. But after his third start on May 2 he entered the Army, thus missing the 1944 World Series, the only fall classic in which the Browns would ever appear during their 52-year history in the American League. Sundra rejoined the Browns for spring training in 1946 after his discharge, but was released on May 29, marking the end of his baseball career.

Sundra was good with the bat for a pitcher, posting a .209 batting average (63-for-302) with 33 runs, 2 home runs, 22 RBI and 20 bases on balls in 168 games.

Later, Sundra sued the Browns under the G.I. Bill, claiming that he should have been kept on the roster for one year. He asked for $5,413, the difference between what he had been paid and his 1946 salary, but lost in federal court in a decision rendered in 1949. He worked in construction until he fell ill in late 1950.

Sundra died in Cleveland, four days before his 42nd birthday, a victim of cancer. He was buried in Cleveland's Calvary Cemetery.
