= Dean McAdams =

American football player (1917–1996)

No. 6, 60, 66, 7
- Position: Halfback

Personal information
- Born: October 3, 1917; Caldwell, Idaho, U.S.
- Died: January 10, 1996 (aged 78); Seattle, Washington, U.S.
- Listed height: 6 ft 1 in (1.85 m)
- Listed weight: 193 lb (88 kg)

Career information
- High school: Caldwell
- College: Washington (1937–1940)
- NFL draft: 1941: 1st round, 8th overall pick

Career history
- Brooklyn Dodgers (1941–1943); Seattle Bombers (1944); Los Angeles Bulldogs (1945)

Awards and highlights
- All-AFL (1944); NFL punting yards leader (1942); Third-team All-American (1940); 2× First-team All-PCC (1939, 1940)

Career NFL statistics
- Rushing yards: 375
- Rushing average: 2
- Receptions: 12
- Receiving yards: 111
- Passing yards: 932
- TD–INT: 4–25
- Stats at Pro Football Reference

Dean LeRoy McAdams (October 3, 1917 – January 10, 1996) was an American professional football player who played three seasons with the Brooklyn Dodgers of the National Football League (NFL). He was selected by the Dodgers with the eighth overall pick of the 1941 NFL draft after playing college football at the University of Washington.

== Early life ==
Dean LeRoy McAdams was born on October 3, 1917, in Caldwell, Idaho. He attended Caldwell High School in Caldwell.

== College career ==
McAdams was a member of the Washington Huskies from 1937 to 1940 and a three-year letterman from 1938 to 1940. In 1939, he was named first-team All-PCC by the Associated Press (AP) and second-team by the United Press (UP). He was named first-team All-PCC by both the AP and UP his senior year in 1940. He was also named a third-team All-American by the Newspaper Enterprise Association in 1940.

== Professional career ==
=== Brooklyn Dodgers ===
McAdams was selected by the Brooklyn Dodgers in the first round, with the eighth overall pick, of the 1941 NFL draft. He played in all 11 games for the Dodgers during his rookie year in 1941, completing 12 of 27 passes (44.4%) for 176 yards, two touchdowns, and three interceptions, 38 carries for 99 yards, seven catches for 94 yards, one defensive interception, 16 punts for 761 yards, two of three field goals, and three of three extra points. The team finished the season with a 7–4 record, good for second place in the Eastern Division.

McAdams appeared in all 11 games for the second straight season, starting ten, in 1942, totaling 35 completions on 89 passing attempts (39.3%) for 441 yards, two touchdowns, and 15 interceptions, 110 rushing attempts for 314 yards, 52 punts for 2,158 yards, two of two extra points, seven kick returns for 165 yards, and six punts returns for 95 yards. He led the NFL that season in total punts and punting yards. He also had the longest punt of the season with a 74-yarder. The Dodgers finished the year with a 3–8 record.

McAdams became a free agent after the 1942 season and re-signed with the Dodgers on August 24, 1943. He played in eight games, starting one, in 1943, recording 37 completions on 75 pass attempts (49.3%) for 315 yards, no touchdowns, and seven interceptions, 36 punts for 1,354 yards, three defensive interceptions, and five kick returns for 102 yards. He was released by the Dodgers in 1943.

=== Seattle Bombers ===
McAdams started eight games for the Seattle Bombers of the American Football League (AFL) in 1944, scoring eight passing touchdowns and two rushing touchdowns while earning All-AFL honors.

=== Los Angeles Bulldogs ===
McAdams played for the Los Angeles Bulldogs of the Pacific Coast Professional Football League in 1945, scoring two passing touchdowns.

== Personal life ==
McAdams died on January 10, 1996, in Seattle, Washington.
