= Dave Ribble =

American football player (1907–1943)

No. 18
- Position: Guard / Tackle

Personal information
- Born: March 28, 1907; Brownwood, Texas
- Died: November 3, 1943 (aged 36); Bakersfield, California
- Listed height: 6 ft 2 in (1.88 m)
- Listed weight: 216 lb (98 kg)

Career information
- College: Hardin–Simmons

Career history
- St. Louis Gunners (1932); Portsmouth Spartans (1932); Memphis Tigers (1933); Chicago Cardinals (1933); Pittsburgh Pirates (1934–1935); Pittsburgh Americans (1936)
- Stats at Pro Football Reference

Lorenzo Thomas Ribble, Jr. (March 28, 1907 – November 3, 1943) was a professional football player in the National Football League for the Portsmouth Spartans, Chicago Cardinals and Pittsburgh Pirates. He also played in the second American Football League for the Pittsburgh Americans. He also played for the independent St. Louis Gunners in 1932 and the Memphis Tigers in 1933. The Gunners did not join the NFL until 1934.
