= Luxor, Pennsylvania =

Unincorporated community in Pennsylvania, US

- Unincorporated community
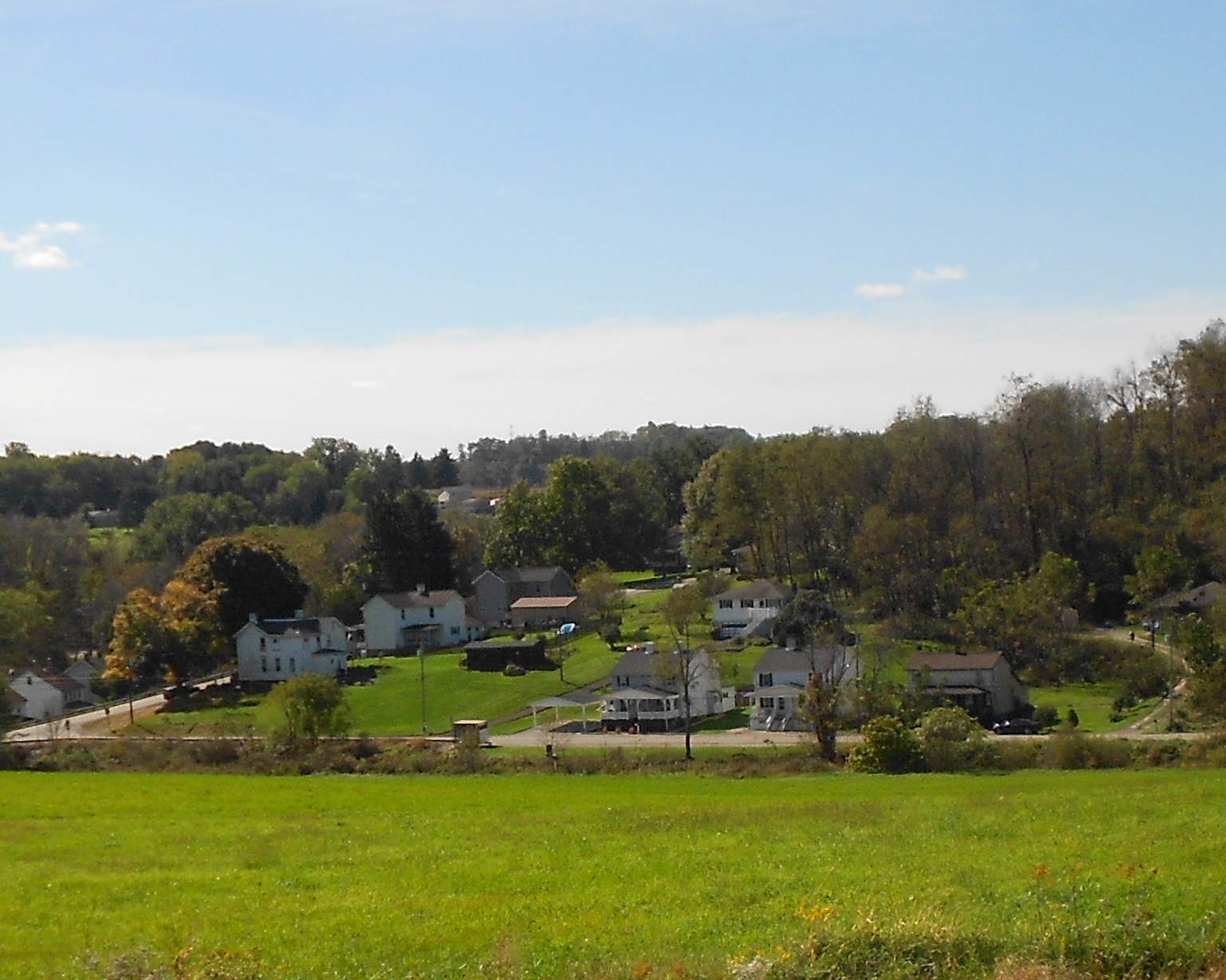
- Intersection of Bovard-Luxor Road and Tipple Row Road in Luxor PA

- Location within the U.S. state of Pennsylvania Luxor, Pennsylvania (the United States)
- Coordinates: 40°20′3″N 79°28′41″W
- Country: United States
- State: Pennsylvania
- County: Westmoreland
- Elevation: 1,089 ft (332 m)
- Time zone: UTC-5 (Eastern (EST))
  - Summer (DST): UTC-4 (EDT)
- ZIP codes: 15662
- GNIS feature ID: 1180092

Luxor is an unincorporated community and coal town in Hempfield Township, Westmoreland County, Pennsylvania, United States.

== History ==
The town was established by the Jamison Coal and Coke Company to provide housing for employees of its nearby coal mining complex. Jamison's underground bituminous coal mine, known as Luxor or No. 1 Mine, began operations in the 1890s. Served by the Alexandria branch of the Pennsylvania Railroad, it employed 179 persons by 1897. By 1910 the complex included over 400 coking ovens. In the 1940s the Sekora Coal Company operated a strip mine northeast of the old No. 1 mine. Coal mining in Luxor ended in 1972.

== Today ==
Luxor has its own post office, established in 1894, and zip code (15662). The area covered by this zip code has a population of 271 people. The mining company store, which has been demolished, stood near where the post office is now located. The Luxor Volunteer Fire Department closed in March 2021 due to a lack of membership.

In May 2022 a resident of Luxor was rescued after he accidentally stepped into a sinkhole in his back yard and fell some 25 feet into an abandoned mine shaft.

== Notable people ==
- Mike Sebastian - former halfback in the National Football League and second American Football League
- Steve Sundra, former Major League Baseball pitcher and 1939 World Series Champion

== Gallery ==
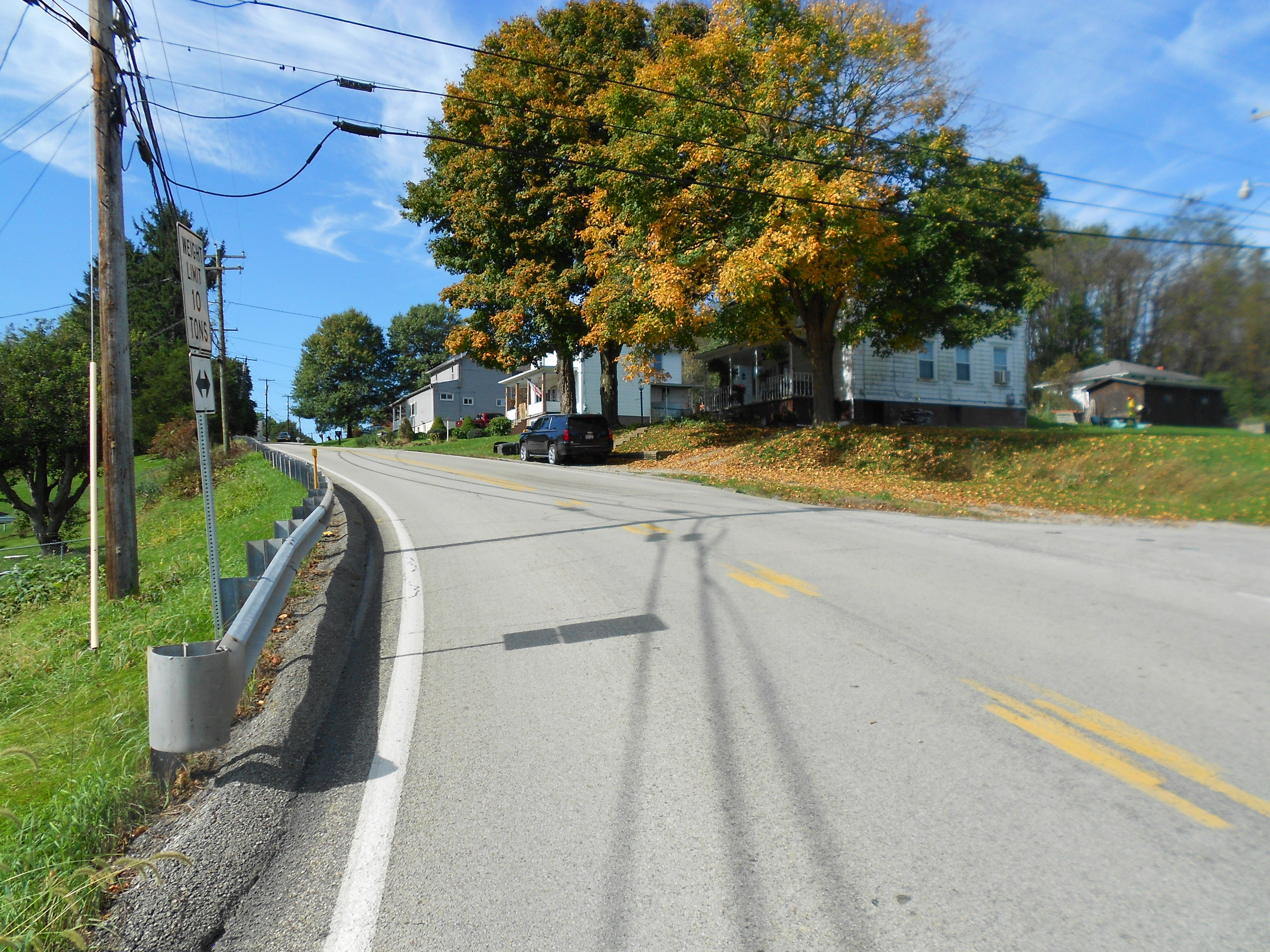
Houses built for miners

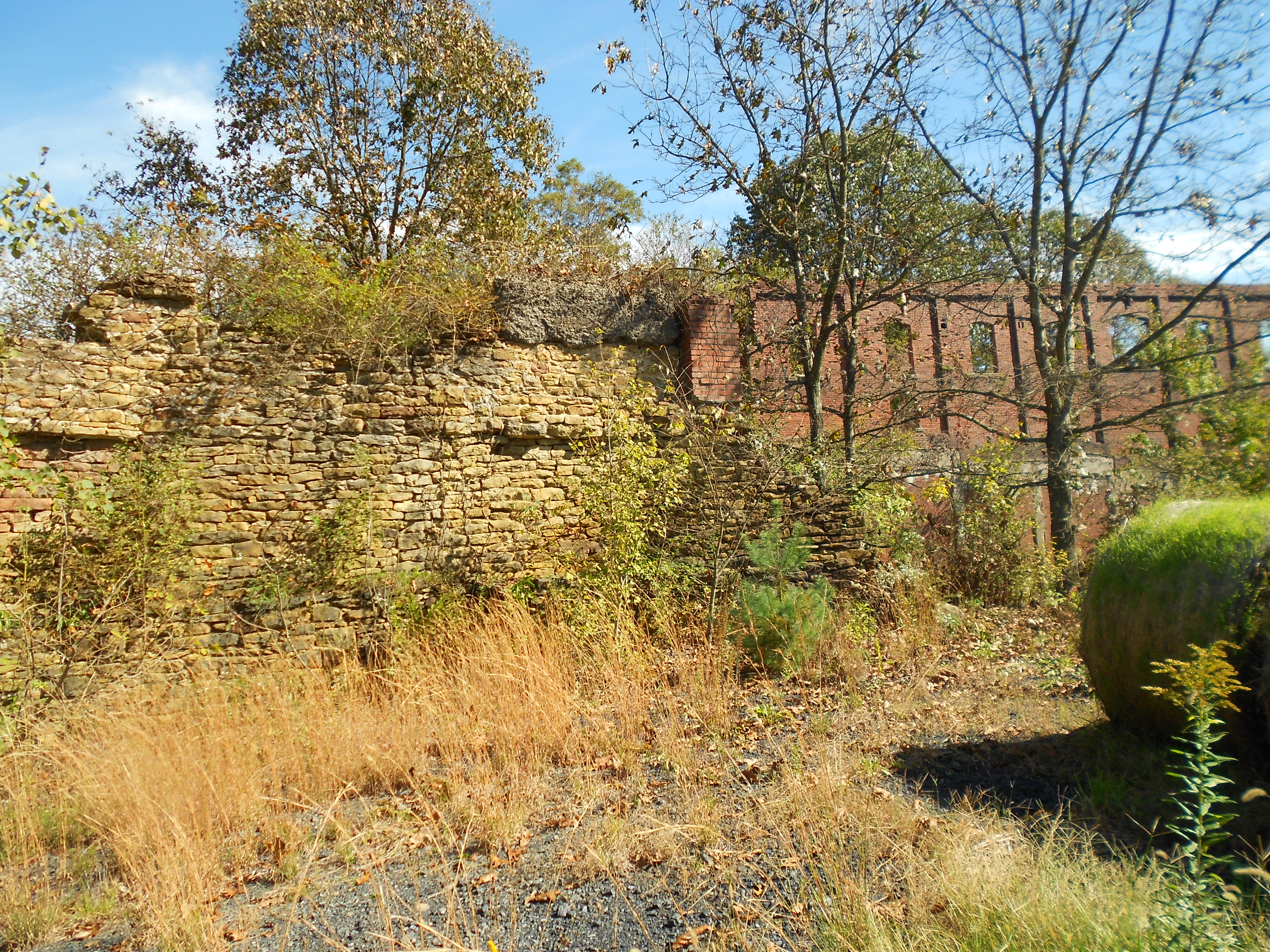
Remains of coal tipple

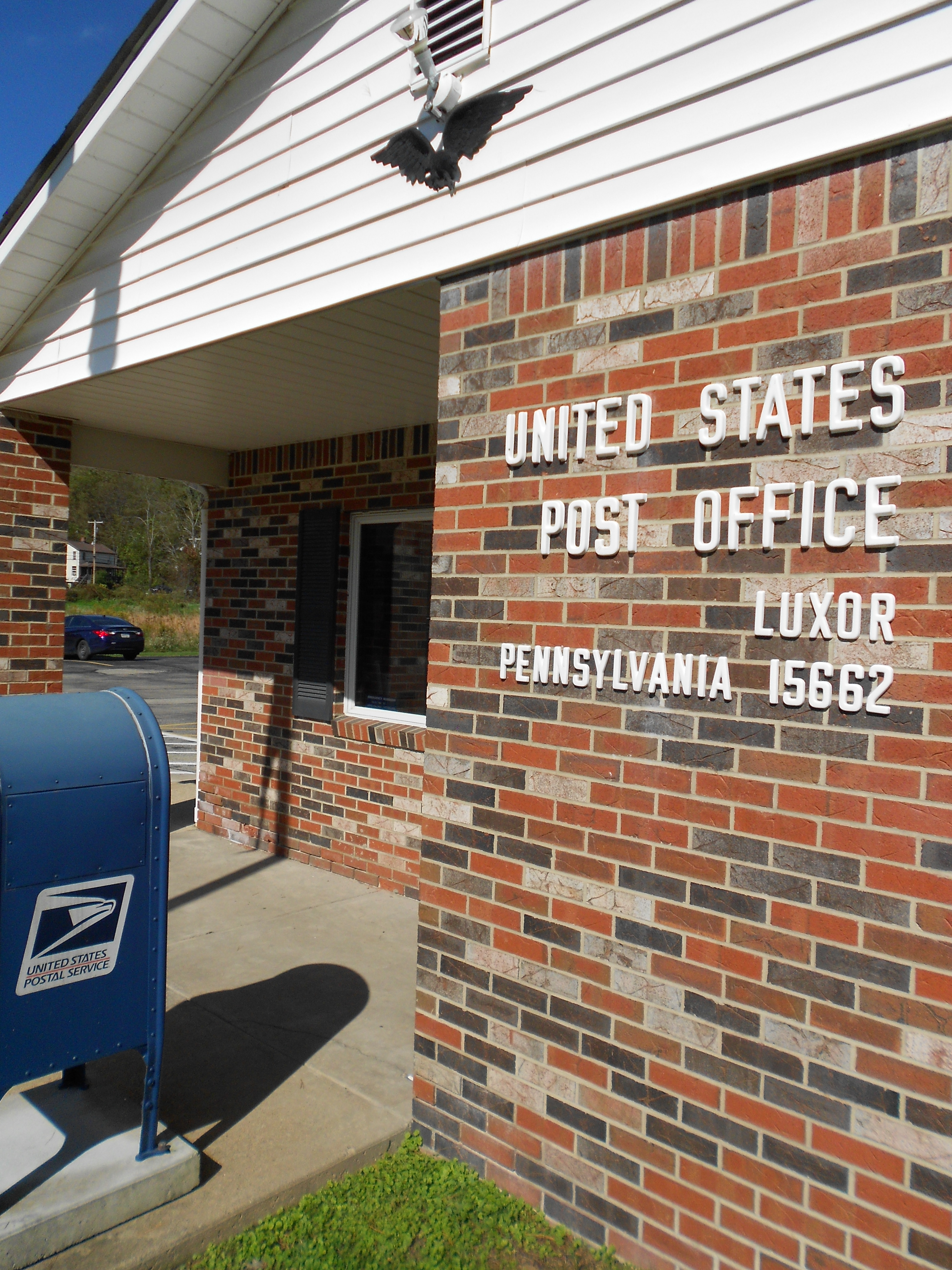
At intersection of Bovard Luxor Road and Tipple Row Road

== See also ==
Pennsylvania Mine Map Atlas - Pennsylvania State University.
