= Jerry Corcoran =

American football player (1893–1981)

Profile
- Positions: Owner, running back

Personal information
- Born: November 15, 1893; Columbus, Ohio, U.S.
- Died: February 3, 1981 (aged 87); San Bernardino County, California, U.S.

Career history

Playing
- Columbus Panhandles (1917)

Operations
- Los Angeles Buccaneers (1926) Executive; Buffalo Bisons (1929) General manager; Cleveland Indians (1931) Owner; Los Angeles Bulldogs (1938–1948) Owner, business manager

Gerald Corcoran (November 15, 1893 – February 3, 1981) was an American football player and executive. He was a running back for the Columbus Panhandles in 1917. He was general manager of the Buffalo Bisons in 1929, the owner of the Cleveland Indians in 1931 and was also the owner of the Los Angeles Bulldogs for 11 seasons.
