= Pacific Coast Professional Football League =

Professional American football league based in California

- Most recent season or competition: 1948
- Sport: American football
- Founded: 1940
- First season: 1940
- Folded: 1948
- Claim to fame: Top level football league on US west coast prior to 1946
- No. of teams: 4 (1941, 1942, 1948) to 9 (1946)

The Pacific Coast Professional Football League (PCPFL), also known as the Pacific Coast Football League (PCFL) and Pacific Coast League (PCL) was a professional American football minor league based in California. It operated from 1940 through 1948. One of the few minor American professional sports leagues that competed in the years of World War II, the PCPFL was regarded as a minor league of the highest level, particularly from 1940 to 1945, at a time in which the National Football League (NFL) did not extend further west than Chicago and Green Bay. It was also the first professional football league to have a team based in Hawaii (the Hawaiian Warriors).

Formed from the wreckage of a failed California Pro Football League, the PCPFL showcased the Los Angeles Bulldogs and the Hollywood Bears. The league became the “home” of African American football stars (including Kenny Washington, Woody Strode, and, briefly, Jackie Robinson) as the NFL had developed and enforced a color barrier in 1934 and extended until 1946.

After reaching a peak in 1945, the importance and popularity of the PCPFL declined rapidly in the post-World War years as the NFL's Los Angeles Rams and the All-America Football Conference's Los Angeles Dons established a major league presence with games in the Coliseum. The resulting competition was devastating to the PCPFL: teams averaging over 10,000 spectators per game in 1944 and 1945 dropped to 1,000 by 1946.

In December 1948, the PCPFL folded. The Los Angeles Bulldogs, the only league member to have participated in every season of the league's existence, was in such financial straits that they did not play the last two scheduled games in 1948, and the Hollywood Bears had become a traveling team in 1948.

== League origins ==
=== History of early professional football in California ===
Prior to 1936, the history of professional football in California was not a hopeful one. While there were two “major league Los Angeles teams” in 1926 (the Buccaneers of the NFL and the Los Angeles Wildcats of the first American Football League), both were actually traveling teams (the Buccaneers were based in Chicago, the Wildcats in Moline, Illinois) that lasted only one season, but several NFL and AFL teams would also play exhibition contests in the West, sometimes with other NFL or AFL teams, but also against some of the local semi-pro teams in the region, in the following year or two.

==== Pacific Coast League (1926) ====
In the wake of two barnstorming tours by Red Grange (the latter of which also featured the Buccaneers and Wildcats) a league was formed in 1926 and called the Pacific Coast League, but it lasted only one season after drawing an average of 3,500 fans a game.

Team	W	L	T	Pct.	PF	PA
Hollywood Generals	5	0	0	1.000	63	3
Oakland Oaks	3	2	0	.600	36	33
San Francisco Tigers	1	3	0	.250	53	35
Fresno Wine Crushers	0	4	0	.000	9	90

==== California Winter League (1927–1928) ====
With an aim to mimic Grange tour success, in January 1927 the Galloping Ghost AFL's Yankees joined by another AFL team – the Los Angeles Wildcats and together with the NFL's Duluth Eskimos and Los Angeles Buccaneers formed the California winter league, following the end of the fall NFL and AFL seasons. The teams also scheduled game against the PCL Hollywood Generals and the California All-Stars (amalgamation of the Oakland Oaks and San Francisco Tigers). It was the first major league to operate in the West Coast.

The best team in both seasons was the Los Angeles Wildcats, dubbed Wilson's Wildcats by the press and included a few Providence Steam Roller players plus a collection of West Coast stars, was not chosen to play in the champion series, as they did not drew well enough. Instead, Grange's Yankees played against the Buccaneers (known as Brick Muller's Buccaneers), winning the first one 14–0 and losing the second one 6–7. The Eskimos finished last, and were known as Nevers-Imlay Giants after getting reinforcement from West Coast colleges (including Tut Imlay).

1927 California Winter League standings
Team	W	L	T	Pct.	PF	PA
Wilson’s Wildcats	2	0	0	1.000	45	7
Muller's Buccaneers	3	2	0	.600	56	43
Grange’s Yankees	2	2	0	.500	45	7
Nevers-Imlay Giants	2	3	0	.400	39	37

For the 1928 season, the Cleveland Bulldogs (known as Benny Friedman's Bulldogs) replaced the Buccaneers, which lost to the Yankees 6–13 in the 1928 championship game.

1928 California Winter League standings
Team	W	L	T	Pct.	PF	PA
Wilson’s Wildcats	2	1	1	.667	45	7
Grange’s Yankees	3	2	1	.600	42	39
Friedman's Bulldogs	2	2	1	.500	38	34
Nevers-Imlay Giants	0	2	1	.000	19	33

The league folded after decline in attendance in the second year.

==== American Legion League (1934–1935) ====
In 1934, four teams from the Los Angeles area and two from San Francisco formed another Pacific Coast League.

1934 Pacific Coast League standings
Team	Wins	Losses	Ties	%	PF	PA
California Giants	3	0	0	1.000	41	28
Southern California Maroons	5	1	0	.833	79	13
Westwood Cubs	2	2	1	.500	68	58
Stanford Braves	2	2	1	.500	37	33
Del Rey Shamrocks	0	3	1	.125	33	68
Moraga Wolves	0	2	0	.000	14	28

When the two San Francisco teams withdrew from the league after the 1934 season, the four L.A. teams continued to compete in 1935 as the American Legion League (some called it the American Legion Football League, or ALFL). It folded after one season under the new name.

1935 American Legion League standings
Team	Wins	Losses	Ties	%	PF	PA
Westwood Cubs	5	2	1	.688	94	51
Los Angeles Maroons	4	2	1	.643	74	68
Hollywood Braves	2	3	0	.400	48	50
California Shamrocks	0	4	0	.000	3	50

After the season, Westwood played an exhibition game against the 1935 NFL Champions, the Detroit Lions, at Gilmore Stadium in Los Angeles before 16,000 fans: the Lions beat the Cubs in a rout, 67–14.

=== The Los Angeles Bulldogs and the formation of the Pacific Coast Professional Football League ===
The 1930s proved to be a boon for professional football leagues in the United States (the NFL grew in popularity even in light of competition of the second AFL in 1936 and 1937), but it was a “golden age” for minor league football. The year 1936 also marked the first year of the Dixie League of the American South (the DL lasted until the fall of 1947), the American Association (which changed its name to the American Football League in 1946 and lasted until 1950) ... and a team that formed for the expressed purpose of joining the National Football League, but was passed over in favor of the Cleveland Rams: the Los Angeles Bulldogs.

Owned by the local chapter of the American Legion, managed by Harry Myers, and coached by Gus Henderson, the fledgling Bulldogs played all the games in its inaugural season in Gilmore Stadium, playing local teams like the Salinas Packers and the Hollywood Stars, but also the Philadelphia Eagles (won, 10–7), Pittsburgh Pirates (won, 21–7), Chicago Cardinals (won, 13–10), Brooklyn Dodgers (tied, 13–13), Chicago Bears (lost, 7–0), and Green Bay Packers (lost, 49–0). In their six games against the NFL, the Bulldogs compiled a 3–2–1 record while having a 6–3–1 season overall.

Myers was confident of receiving an NFL franchise in the 1937 league owners meeting, but after seeing presentations from Houston, Cleveland, and Los Angeles, the owners offered the franchise to Cleveland, then a member of the second American Football League. The Bulldogs were invited to replace the Rams in the fledgling league, and proceeded with the first perfect season in major league professional football: eight wins in AFL games (and the only AFL team with a winning record in the 1937 season), 18 wins including exhibition games, no losses, no ties. Not even the Miami Dolphins, who lost an exhibition game immediately prior to their "perfect" 1972 season, can make the claim. The Bulldogs' complete dominance of the league exacerbated the financial difficulties of the AFL to the point that the league was forced to fold after the end of the 1937 season.

==== California Football League (1938) ====
Another attempt at a league in California in 1936 barely got off the ground. One of the teams, the Hollywood Stars, was sold to Paul Schissler, who coached the Chicago Cardinals (1933–34) and Brooklyn Dodgers (1935–36) of the NFL. Schissler planned yet another league, this one to showcase the Bulldogs and his Stars. Myers declined the invitation to join the new California and opted for a season in which the Bulldogs were an independent team (as was the case for another “survivor” of the second AFL, the Cincinnati Bengals).

The 1938 league started with teams in Stockton, Fresno and Oakland, in addition to Hollywood and Salinas. The CFL had little importance without the Bulldogs and it canceled after one season, without an attempt to crown a champion.

Team	W	L	T	Pct.	PF	PA
Stockton Shippers	2	0	0	1.000	39	7
Hollywood Stars	4	1	0	.800	103	39
Salinas Iceberg Packers	2	3	0	.400	89	78
Fresno Wine Crushers	2	5	0	.285	51	90
Oakland Cardinals	0	2	0	.000	6	78

Los Angeles Bulldogs finished the season with a 11–2–2 record, including 5–0 record against CFL members.

==== American Professional Football Association (1939) ====
After 1938 "independent" season, the Bulldogs joined the Bengals in becoming members of yet another American Football League (which later changed its name to the American Professional Football Association) for the 1939 season. The Bulldogs won the 1939 league title (and had a new owner, Jerry Corcoran), and before the end of league play, had already given notice that they would be leaving at the end of the season to become a charter member of the Pacific Coast Professional Football League (the AFL/APFA would subsequently end after yet another AFL signed three APFA member clubs and split the older league).

== History ==
=== 1940 ===
Charter members of the 1940 edition of the PCPFL include the Bulldogs, the Hollywood Bears (which Paul Schissler had renamed in honor of his alma mater, UCLA), the Phoenix Panthers, the Oakland Giants, and the San Diego Bombers

Team	W	L	T	Pct.	PF	PA
Los Angeles Bulldogs	7	2	1	.778	212	142
Hollywood Bears	6	2	0	.750	145	84
Oakland Giants	1	3	2	.250	30	65
Phoenix Panthers	0	3	1	.000	67	97
San Diego Bombers	0	4	0	.000	26	92

The Bears' and Bulldogs' losses were to each other (two each). Kenny Washington and Woody Strode starred for the Bears after being denied entrance into the NFL due to their race. The Bears also had the leading scorer of the league, former New York Giant Kink Richards. Phoenix and Oakland dropped out at the end of the 1940 season; the San Francisco Bay Packers joined for 1941.

=== 1941 ===
Team	W	L	T	Pct.	PF	PA
Hollywood Bears	8	0	0	1.000	167	151
Los Angeles Bulldogs	4	4	0	.500	156	119
San Diego Bombers	1	5	0	.167	78	147
San Francisco Bay Packers	1	5	0	.167	23	107

The season was cut short after the attack on Pearl Harbor (the military was fearing another West Coast attack). Kenny Washington led the Bears to a perfect season, having beaten Los Angeles three times to clinch the title. Washington's UCLA teammate Jackie Robinson played briefly for the Bulldogs before moving to Honolulu. Steve Bagarus of San Diego had a 100-yard interception return against the Bears. Kink Richards repeated as the league's high scorer.

=== 1942 ===
Team	W	L	T	Pct.	PF	PA
San Diego Bombers	4	1	0	.800	71	28
San Francisco Bay Packers	2	1	0	.667	32	28
Los Angeles Bulldogs	2	2	0	.500	35	62
Hollywood Bears	0	4	0	.000	13	35

Unlike the American Football League of 1940 and the American Association, both of which suspended operations after 1941, the PCPFL decided to continue play during World War II. Military service, nonetheless, wreaked havoc with the teams' rosters. Bears owner/coach Paul Schlisser left for the war as Kenny Washington was injured most of the abbreviated season. The Bulldogs roster was depleted by the war effort. Members of the PCPFL also played games with two military teams, the March Field Flyers and the Santa Ana Flyers in response to increasing public interest. San Diego's Steve Bagarus became a star with his versatility as his team won the league title and held its own against the March Field Flyers. The Santa Ana Flyers were 5–0 against the league and claimed the “extended PCL championship.”

=== 1943 ===
Growing in influence, the PCPFL underwent several changes before the 1943 season. Temporarily gone were the Hollywood Bears as owner Paul Schlisser was still overseas; the Oakland Giants returned after a two-year absence; the Alameda Mustangs, Richmond Boilermakers, and the Los Angeles Mustangs joined the league.

Controversy ensued when Los Angeles Mustangs owner Bill Freelove raided the roster of Jerry Corcoran's crosstown Bulldogs. When all was said and done, virtually all the members of the 1942 Bulldogs became members of the 1943 Mustangs. While the controversy was raging, Hollywood got a “leave of absence” from the league until the return of Schlisser from World War II. The former Bears (including former player-coach Kink Richards) became Bulldogs for the 1943 season. Ramifications from Freelove's actions ensued over the next few years.

Team	W	L	T	Pct.	PF	PA
San Diego Bombers	7	1	0	.875	214	177
Los Angeles Mustangs	4	4	0	.500	167	124
Oakland Giants	4	4	0	.500	118	143
Richmond Boilermakers	2	2	0	.500	44	41
Los Angeles Bulldogs	3	4	0	.429	119	125
Alameda Mustangs	1	3	0	.250	53	72
San Francisco Bay Packers	1	4	0	.200	30	123

Richmond leaves the PCPFL at the end of the season.

=== 1944 ===
The Alameda Mustangs moved to San Jose and became the San Jose Mustangs; the Hollywood Wolves entered the league for 1944; and the membership of the Los Angeles Mustangs was revoked by the team owners to protest owner Bill Freelove's raiding of Jerry Corcoran's Los Angeles Bulldogs roster. Freelove responded by forming a new league, the American Football League (with Jerry Giesler as president). In 1944, an unprecedented five Los Angeles area teams were competing in either of the rival leagues.

1944 PCPFL Standings

Team	W	L	T	Pct.	PF	PA
San Diego Bombers	9	0	0	1.000	335	54
San Francisco Bay Packers	4	3	0	.571	107	122
Oakland Giants	4	3	0	.571	46	86
San Jose Mustangs	2	4	0	.333	69	109
Los Angeles Bulldogs	2	5	0	.286	105	168
Hollywood Wolves	0	6	0	.000	46	169

Both leagues had undefeated champions (the PCPFL Bombers had won their third consecutive title).

On December 21, 1944, PCPFL league president J. Rufus Klawans announced a merger between the two leagues. Immediately afterward, the AFL champion Hollywood Rangers and PCPFL champion San Diego Bombers scheduled two games, one at each team's home, to decide the “unified” Pacific Coast championship. Hollywood swept San Diego, winning 42–7 and 21–10, for the bragging rights.

=== 1945 ===
The merger resulted in a “new 1945 PCL” looking remarkably similar to the previous year's edition. The Seattle and Portland AFL teams did not participate in the new league; the AFL champion Hollywood Rangers refused to merge with the Hollywood Bears, which returned after a two-season absence (the Rangers became an independent team in 1945 instead... and then folded after six games). Bill Freelove's Los Angeles Mustangs were refused admittance into the merged league and met the same fate as the Rangers when they tried to play as an independent team in 1945. When the dust of the merger settled, the new PCPFL team lineup was the same as it was in 1944, except with the AFL San Francisco Clippers replacing the Packers and the returning Hollywood Bears replacing the short-lived Wolves of the same locale.

Team	W	L	T	Pct.	PF	PA
Hollywood Bears	8	2	1	.800	248	95
Oakland Giants	7	2	0	.778	151	105
Los Angeles Bulldogs	5	5	1	.500	163	143
San Diego Bombers	4	4	0	.500	159	126
San Francisco Clippers	1	7	0	.125	47	195
San Jose Mustangs	0	5	0	.000	58	162

With the end of World War II, more changes were afoot in the newly merged PCPFL. Kenny Washington and Paul Schlisser returned to the Bears, who ended San Diego's string of league championships. Tailback Dean McAdams, hero of the Rangers' championship campaign of 1944, was scoring touchdowns for the Bulldogs in 1945. San Diego had Bosh Pritchard, who would later be rushing for the Philadelphia Eagles, and the Bulldogs had a new quarterback who would later make a name for himself in San Francisco: Frankie Albert. The NFL's color line was still about a year from being erased; Oakland's Mel Reid, banned by the NFL because of his race, was the PCPFL's most valuable player in 1945.

=== 1946 ===
There were seismic changes in the world of professional football in 1946. The Hollywood Bears and the Los Angeles Bulldogs, who previously had Los Angeles to themselves, now faced competition from the NFL, with the Los Angeles Rams having relocated from Cleveland, and the All-America Football Conference, with the Los Angeles Dons. While the Rams and the Dons were drawing crowds of 40,000 or more to their home games at Los Angeles Memorial Coliseum, the Bulldogs and the Bears (in Gilmore Stadium) were having difficulty getting 1000 paying fans to their much smaller venue.

Another major change came with the rebreaking of the NFL's 12-year-old color barrier, as the Rams signed two of the PCPFL's top stars, Woody Strode and Kenny Washington (both from the Hollywood Bears), which began a slow erosion of the PCPFL's most important talent base, namely black players that the NFL had previously refused to allow into their league.

In the meantime, the PCPFL expanded to a record nine teams and had divisional play for the only time in its history: the two Division Champions would play a single game for the league Championship. New teams include the Tacoma Indians, Sacramento Nuggets, and the Hawaiian Warriors. The San Jose Mustangs were sold and relocated to Utah, becoming the Salt Lake Seagulls.

The Hawaiians played all their games at home, and generally in two-game sets to minimize travel expenses for the mainland opponents. With their own officiating crew, the Warriors had a perceived advantage as they consistently played in front of crowds of over 15,000 people.

The PCPFL, the Dixie League, and the American Association (which changed its name to the American Football League for the 1946 season) entered into a working arrangement with the NFL, agreeing to being, in essence, a farm league to the “big boys” and not allowing any participants in “any outlaw league” (specifically the AAFC) to be a member of any PCPFL team. The compact was formalized March 24, 1946, with the announcement of the formation of the Association of Professional Football Leagues.

Northern Division

Team	W	L	T	Pct.	PF	PA
Tacoma Indians	7	4	0	.636	202	141
San Francisco Clippers	6	4	0	.600	206	130
Salt Lake Seagulls	2	5	1	.286	81	137
Sacramento Nuggets	2	5	1	.286	67	201
Oakland Giants	1	5	0	.167	60	89

Southern Division

Team	W	L	T	Pct.	PF	PA
Los Angeles Bulldogs	9	2	1	.818	318	185
Hawaiian Warriors	8	4	0	.667	236	179
Hollywood Bears	5	5	1	.500	187	196
San Diego Bombers	1	7	0	.125	65	164

The season ended in controversy as the Northern Division title was determined by a game in which the San Francisco Clippers apparently defeated the Los Angeles Bulldogs by a score of 24–19 and claimed the top spot in the division. When Clippers owner Frank Ciraolo entered his team's locker room to participate in the victory celebration, he noticed that John Woudenberg, tackle for the San Francisco 49ers, was wearing a uniform that was assigned to the Clippers' Courtney Thorell. After the “discrepancy” was reported to league officials, the game was declared a 1–0 forfeit to the Bulldogs. As a result, the Northern Division champions were the Tacoma Indians.

The Bulldogs, with 11 players with NFL experience, defeated Tacoma in the league championship game, 38–7, on January 19, 1947. It was the last game of the Indians' existence.

Although the Salt Lake Seagulls had three games canceled in 1946, they would return for another season; but not so the Oakland Giants. The Hollywood Bears took another "leave of absence."

=== 1947 ===
Team	W	L	T	Pct.	PF	PA
Hawaiian Warriors	7	2	0	.778	267	121
Los Angeles Bulldogs	5	3	0	.625	165	126
San Francisco Clippers	4	4	0	.500	158	175
Salt Lake Seagulls	1	4	1	.200	48	130
Sacramento Nuggets	0	4	1	.100	75	161

Back Buddy Abreu was the league's leading rusher and scorer as his Hawaiian Warriors won a narrow “race” with the defending champion Bulldogs (led by quarterback Mel Reid) by beating the team from L.A. 7–6. Sacramento and Salt Lake dropped out of the league after canceling their home-and-home series that was scheduled to finish the PCPFL season.

But having only three active members was not the only issue threatening the continuation of the existence of the league. An investigation led by league president J. Rufus Klawans revealed that members of the Hawaiian Warriors were placing bets on games in which they were participating. Four (Abreu, Ray Scussell, Floyd “Scrap Iron” Rhea, and Jack Keenan) were permanently banned from the league; another ten team members were “suspended indefinitely.”

=== 1948 and the demise of the PCPFL ===
As the PCPFL continued unraveling, the Hollywood Bears return to the fold after a second “leave of absence.” The revitalized Bears were under the watchful eye of former Bulldogs owner Jerry Corcoran as they re-entered the league as a traveling team. The Bulldogs, who used to sell out games at 18,000-seat Gilmore Stadium, had to move to Long Beach after two years of failing to attract 1,000 fans to their home games.

Team	W	L	T	Pct.	PF	PA
Hawaiian Warriors	5	1	0	.833	181	86
Long Beach Bulldogs	3	1	0	.750	102	49
Hollywood Bears	1	3	1	.250	93	152
San Diego Clippers	0	4	1	.000	69	158

The Warriors were the class of the league, averaging 30 points of offense per game despite losing over half of the 1947 squad, and had claimed at least a tie for the league title with a 5–1 record: the Bulldogs had two games left to play (one with the Bears, one with the Clippers) at Long Beach's Veterans Memorial Stadium.

The games were not played, as the legendary Los Angeles Bulldogs – who were the Long Beach Bulldogs in 1948 – dropped out of the PCPFL and folded after drawing only 850 fans to the only PCPFL game in Long Beach; the remaining three teams and the league shortly after decided to fold.

== Successor leagues ==
=== Pacific Football Conference (1957–1958) ===
The Pacific Football Conference was the largest attempt to established a professional football league in West Coast since the PCPFL. The teams were mainly located in California with one lone team in Arizona for the 1958 season. The league attracted strong local talent, including future American Football League stars like Tom Flores and Lionel Taylor.

==== 1957 ====
Team	W	L	T	PF	PA
Petaluma Leghorns	5	0	0	180	0
Santa Cruz Seahawks/Salinas Packers	4	1	0	77	28
South San Francisco Windbreakers	3	2	0	41	64
Contra Costa Panthers	2	3	0	45	98
Fresno Hellcats	1	4	0	21	85
Oakland Gophers	0	5	0	6	113

==== 1958 ====
Team	W	L	T	PF	PA
Orange County Rhinos	5	1	0	160	103
Tucson Rattlers	5	1	0	101	57
Salinas Packers	5	3	0	193	118
Petaluma Leghorns	1	1	0	13	32
Eagle Rock Eracs	2	3	0	82	74
South San Francisco Tanners	1	4	0	36	77
Bakersfield Spoilers	0	6	0	69	193

=== North Pacific Football League (1963–1966) ===
A similar name low-level minor league with teams in the Pacific Northwest region. For the 1965 and 1966 seasons the league had a separate conference in California called Northern California League.

=== California Football League (1974–1982; 1984) ===
The new California Football League was a low-level minor league that began as a semi-pro league in 1974 as a six-team circuit, renamed the Western Football League for the 1976 season, but change back to CFL after one season, when the league expended to eight teams, split into two divisions and became pro.

The Twin City Cougars (1979–1982 champions), San Jose Tigers (1977 and 1978 champions) and Orange County Rhinos were the three strongest teams during the league lifetime.

The formation of the United States Football League sapped the league from most of its talent and led to the cancellation of the CFL before the 1983 season. The CFL tried to come back in 1984 with four teams, based in the northern part of the state, but folded again after that season.

==== Teams ====
- Antioch/Contra Costa Hornets (1980–1982)
- Fairfield/Solano-Napa Flyers (1977–1978)
- Fremont Cavaliers (1982)
- Long Beach/Los Angeles Mustangs (1977–1981)
- Los Angeles Norsemen (1977–1978)
- Los Angeles Thunderbolts (1980)
- Napa Valley Bears (1979–1982)
- North Bay Rainbows (1982)
- Sacramento Buffaloes (1977–1981)
- San Diego Sharks (1980–1981)
- San Gabriel Saints (1977–1978)
- San Jose Tigers (1977–1982)
- Oceanside Sharks (1979)
- Orange County/Southern California Rhinos (1977–1981)
- Orange Empire Outlaws (1981)
- Twin City Cougars (1977–1982)
- Ventura County Americans (1979–1981)

In 1978 San Jose was declared minor-league "National Champions" after beating 32–6 the American Football Association's Shreveport Steamer, in a game between the leagues champions called "King Kong Bowl".

In 1980 the Twin City Cougars were declared the "West Coast Championship", after beating 28–23 the Pierce County Bengals from the semi-pro Pacific Northwest Football League (also known as the Northwest International Alliance). They also won the Minor Professional Football Association minor league championship after beating the Northern States Football League's Delavan Red Devils. They won their second MPFA championship in 1981 after beating the Pittsburgh Colts.
