= George Kenneally =

American football player and coach (1902–1968)

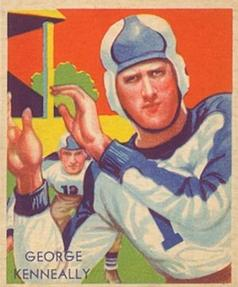

No. 16, 13, 20
- Position: End

Personal information
- Born: April 12, 1902; Boston, Massachusetts, U.S.
- Died: September 3, 1968 (aged 66); Boston, Massachusetts, U.S.
- Listed height: 6 ft 0 in (1.83 m)
- Listed weight: 190 lb (86 kg)

Career information
- High school: Boston Latin (Boston, Massachusetts)
- College: St. Bonaventure

Career history

Playing
- Pottsville Maroons (1926–1928); Boston Bulldogs (1929); Chicago Cardinals (1930); Boston Braves (1932); Philadelphia Eagles (1933–1935)

Coaching
- Boston (1931) Assistant; Boston Braves (1932) Assistant; Philadelphia Eagles (1933–1935) Assistant; Boston Shamrocks (1936−1938); Revere HS (MA) (1939−1949); Brandeis (1950−1953) Assistant
- Stats at Pro Football Reference

George Vincent "Gigi" Kenneally Sr (April 12, 1902 – September 3, 1968) was an American football end in the National Football League (NFL) for the Pottsville Maroons, the Boston Bulldogs, the Chicago Cardinals, the Boston Braves, and the Philadelphia Eagles. He attended St. Bonaventure University.

== Early life ==
Kenneally began his athletic career at Boston Latin High School where he played varsity football, baseball, and held the city record for the fifty-yard dash. Upon graduating in 1919 he joined a group of local youths who were forming a semi-pro football team to play out of the local Knights of Columbus. He then followed his older brother and enrolled at St. Bonaventure, where in 1922, he began his collegiate career. During his four years there he was given sixteen varsity letters, including ones for boxing, as well as being the captain of the football team.

== Professional career ==
=== Pottsville Maroons/Boston Bulldogs ===
Kenneally joined the NFL in 1926 with the Pottsville Maroons of Pottsville, Pennsylvania. After his rookie season, he was chosen as the team's captain and was also named to his first All-Pro Squad in 1927, as well as in 1928. At the close of the 1928 season the team succumbed to financial difficulties and was no longer solvent. He, along with his partner, then decided to purchase the Maroons franchise for $2,500. Kenneally then transferred the team to Boston where they became the Boston Bulldogs. Kenneally had many positions in the franchise; that of part owner, assistant Coach, team captain and offensive end. The Bulldogs were a competitive team and would finish the season at 4-4, but the Wall Street Crash of 1929 caused the team to fold.

=== Chicago Cardinals ===
Kenneally was back in the NFL in 1930, playing for the Chicago Cardinals. This season would prove to be one of his best in the league as he helped guide the struggling franchise to a 5–6 record, but also his only season for Chicago. The highlight of the season was an indoor exhibition game played at Chicago Stadium between the Chicago Bears and Cardinals with the proceeds aiding unemployment relief funds.

=== Boston University ===
In 1931, Kenneally accepted a coaching position at Boston University. He also utilized this sabbatical year by unsuccessfully trying to generate funds to restart his Bulldog franchise. He would lead the Marquette's to an undefeated season with a schedule that consisted of two professional opponents. They outscored their opponents that season 236 to 9.

=== Boston Braves ===
In 1932, Kenneally returned to Boston to play/coach for George Preston Marshall's Boston Braves. He played for the Braves for only one season as an offensive end and an assistant coach.

=== Philadelphia Eagles ===
In 1933, Kenneally left Boston with Lud Wray to play for and assist with the newly formed Philadelphia Eagles franchise. For the next three seasons, he would anchor the Eagles line, serve as the team's captain and assistant coach, and was again selected All-Pro during the 1934 season. He retired at the end of the 1935 season.

== After football ==
=== Boston Shamrocks ===
Kenneally was offered the position of head coach and general manager of the Boston Shamrocks of the newly formed American Football League. The Shamrocks would play a 19-game schedule which resulted in them capturing the league title as AFL champions for the 1936 season. However, the AFL was financially unstable and was soon forced to cease operations. The Shamrocks would continue to operate as an independent until 1938.

=== Later years ===
In 1939, Kenneally accepted the position of athletic director, head coach, and history teacher at Revere High School. In 1950, he left the Revere athletic program in a vastly improved state and became the line coach at Brandeis University for four years. He then returned to his old job as head of the Social Studies department at Revere, the position he would hold until his death.

Kenneally died on September 3, 1968. He was survived by his five children, including state legislator George V. Kenneally Jr.

=== Legacy ===
- In the 1950s, Reader's Digest published an article entitled "George Kenneally the toughest two-way end to ever play for the Philadelphia Eagles."
- In 1951, he was elected to the New England Sports Hall of Fame as a charter member.
- In 1970, he was inducted into the Pennsylvania Sports Hall of Fame.
- In 1973, he was inducted into the Brandeis University Hall of Fame
- In 1976, he was inducted into the Saint Bonaventure Hall Of Fame.
- In 1990, he was inducted into the Massachusetts High School Coaches Hall of Fame and the South Boston Hall of Fame.
