= Rudy Comstock =

American football player and coach (1900–1975)

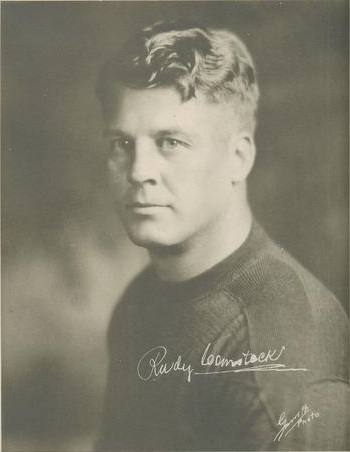

Profile
- Position: Guard

Personal information
- Born: August 14, 1900; Pender, Nebraska, U.S.
- Died: November 21, 1959 (aged 59); Warren, Ohio, U.S.
- Listed height: 5 ft 10 in (1.78 m)
- Listed weight: 209 lb (95 kg)

Career information
- High school: Pawhuska (OK)
- College: Georgetown

Career history

Playing
- Canton Bulldogs (1923, 1925); Cleveland Bulldogs (1924); Frankford Yellow Jackets (1926–1929); New York Giants (1930); Green Bay Packers (1931–1933)

Coaching
- Pittsburgh Americans (1936)

Awards and highlights
- 4× NFL champion (1923, 1924, 1926, 1931); Canton Daily News: 1st Team All-NFL (1923); Collyers Eye Mag.: 2nd Team All-NFL (1926); GB Press-Gazette: 2nd Team All-NFL (1930)
- Stats at Pro Football Reference

Rudolph S. Comstock (August 14, 1900 – November 21, 1959) was an American football player who played eleven seasons in the National Football League (NFL), for the Canton Bulldogs, Cleveland Bulldogs, Frankford Yellow Jackets, New York Giants and Green Bay Packers.

After his playing career, he was a coach at Oklahoma State University and then, in 1936, the head coach at the Pittsburgh Americans of the second American Football League (AFL).
