= Jess Quatse =

American football player (1908–1977)

Jesse Quatse

No. 23, 48, 9
- Position: Tackle

Personal information
- Born: April 4, 1908; Rillton, Pennsylvania, U.S.
- Died: December 26, 1977 (aged 69); Lakeland, Florida, U.S.
- Listed height: 5 ft 11 in (1.80 m)
- Listed weight: 226 lb (103 kg)

Career information
- High school: Greensburg-Salem (PA)
- College: Pittsburgh

Career history

Playing
- Green Bay Packers (1933); Pittsburgh Pirates (1933–1934); New York Giants (1935); New York Yankees (1936)

Coaching
- Pittsburgh Americans (1937)

Awards and highlights
- Consensus All-American (1931)
- Stats at Pro Football Reference

Jesse A. Quatse (April 4, 1908 – December 26, 1977) was an American football offensive tackle in the National Football League (NFL) for the Green Bay Packers, Pittsburgh Pirates, and the New York Giants. In 1927, he coached the Pittsburgh Americans of the second American Football League (AFL). He had also played in the second AFL the year prior for the New York Yankees. Prior to his professional career, Quatse played college football at the University of Pittsburgh.
