= Mike Palm (American football) =

American football player, coach, and owner (1899–1974)

No. 9, 53
- Positions: Halfback, quarterback

Personal information
- Born: November 24, 1899; St. James, Minnesota, U.S.
- Died: April 8, 1974 (aged 74); Washington, D.C., U.S.
- Listed height: 5 ft 10 in (1.78 m)
- Listed weight: 170 lb (77 kg)

Career information
- High school: Carlisle (Carlisle, Pennsylvania)
- College: Penn State

Career history

Playing
- New York Giants (1925–1926); Cincinnati Reds (1933)

Coaching
- Georgetown (1926–1929) Assistant coach; Cincinnati Reds (1933) Head coach; West Virginia (1934) Backfield coach; Harvard (1935) Backfield coach; Rochester/Brooklyn Tigers (1936–1937) Head coach; New York Giants (1941–1947) Backfield coach

Operations
- Rochester/Brooklyn Tigers (1936–1937) Owner
- Coaching profile at Pro Football Reference
- Stats at Pro Football Reference

Myron Herrick "Mike" Palm (November 24, 1899 – April 8, 1974) was an American football player, coach, and executive. He played professionally in the National Football League (NFL) for the New York Giants from 1925 to 1926 and a player-coach in 1933 for the NFL's Cincinnati Reds. He was also the owner and head coach of the Brooklyn/Rochester Tigers of the second American Football League (AFL) from 1936 to 1937.

Prior to his professional career, Palm played college football at Pennsylvania State University. He played in the Nittany Lions' 14–3 loss to USC in the 1923 Rose Bowl. During the game, he scored Penn State's only points off a field goal. Palm was also an All-American hammer thrower for the Penn State Nittany Lions track and field team, finishing runner-up in the hammer throw at the 1922 NCAA Track and Field Championships.

Palm was an assistant football coach at Georgetown University from 1926 to 1929 under head coach Lou Little. He was the backfield coach at West Virginia University in 1934 and was hired in the same role as Harvard the next year under head coach Dick Harlow. In 1941, Palm returned to the Giants as a backfield coach under head coach Steve Owen, succeeding Bo Molenda.

Palm was born on November 24, 1899, in St. James, Minnesota. He retired from coaching in 1947. The next year, he opened Mike Palm's Congressional Relaxatorium, a restaurant in the Capitol Hill neighborhood of Washington, D.C. He owned and operated the restaurant until his death, on April 8, 1974, in Washington.
