= Rochester Tigers =

Rochester-Brooklyn Tigers
Logo

General information
- Founded: 1936
- Folded: 1937
- Stadium: Yankee Stadium; Red Wing Stadium
- Headquartered: Brooklyn, New York; Rochester, New York, United States
- Colors: Yellow, Orange, Black

Personnel
- Owners: Mike Palm; Harry Newman
- Head coach: Mike Palm

Team history
- Brooklyn Tigers (1936); Rochester Tigers (1936-37)

League / conference affiliations
- American Football League (1936-37)

The Rochester Tigers were a professional American football team that competed in the second American Football League in 1936 and 1937. Owned by Mike Palm (who doubled as coach) and Harry Newman, the Tigers were originally awarded to Rochester as a charter member of the AFL, but were shifted to Brooklyn two weeks afterward despite the lack of availability of a home stadium in its new home town, then moved back to Rochester midway through the 1936 season.

== 1936 season ==
The Brooklyn Tigers delayed their start of the 1936 season as the team started as essentially a traveling team, with the Tigers playing their first game on October 11 (in Week Four of the league schedule); while Ebbets Field was designated the Tigers' home stadium, the only AFL game scheduled to be played there was moved to Yankee Stadium to accommodate a large anticipated crowd for the Tigers' November 1 game against the New York Yankees.

As the two teams played to a 3-3 tie, another AFL team (the former Syracuse Braves) played its only game as the Rochester Braves at Red Wing Stadium before going out of business. Two weeks later, the Tigers moved back to Rochester and renamed themselves the Rochester Tigers. Playing in Red Wing Stadium, the Tigers lost the last two games of the season, wrapping up a season of futility with no wins, six losses, and one tie (ironically, one-half game behind the defunct Syracuse/Rochester Braves). Yet the team managed to survive the turbulent season to continue into 1937 with plans on staying full-time in Rochester.

== 1937 season ==
The 1937 AFL season presented several changes, most notably a reconfiguration as the Cleveland Rams departed for the National Football League while the Cincinnati Bengals and the Los Angeles Bulldogs joined the league. While the Rochester Braves were a distant memory, the Rochester Tigers kept their owners and coach from the 1936 season, but like fellow AFL members Pittsburgh Americans, the Tigers were not in good financial shape.

As Los Angeles marched through its AFL schedule on its way to the first undefeated-untied season in major professional American football history, the other five AFL members were financially devastated. Pittsburgh, averaging only about 2000 fans in attendance, folded after only three games in 1937; Rochester, with only slightly better numbers despite a second-place 3-3-1 record, barely hung on until the end of the season. After the last game of the season, the AFL folded; only the Bulldogs and the Bengals, the two newest AFL members, continued into 1938.

Team	Year	W	L	T	Finish	Coach
Brooklyn Tigers^{*}	1936	0	6	1	7th (AFL)	Mike Palm
Rochester Tigers	1937	3	3	1	2nd (AFL)	Mike Palm.

^{*} 0-2 as Rochester Tigers in 1936
