= Syracuse Braves =

Syracuse-Rochester Braves

General information
- Founded: 1936
- Folded: 1937
- Stadium: Municipal Stadium; Silver Stadium
- Headquartered: Syracuse, New York; Rochester, New York, United States
- Colors: Unknown

Personnel
- Head coach: Don Irwin & Red Badgro

Team history
- Syracuse Braves (1936); Rochester Braves (1936)

League / conference affiliations
- American Football League II

The Syracuse Braves were a professional American football team that competed in the second American Football League in 1936 and 1937. Coached by Don Irwin and Red Badgro, the Braves played in Municipal Stadium, which had a capacity of only about 10,000 people. The team was not a strong draw as it lost its first five games, prompting a search for a new home, including Providence, Rhode Island, before settling upon a move to Rochester.

On October 25, 1936, a 16–7 victory over the Boston Shamrocks in Fenway Park provided the franchise its first win in its last game as the Syracuse Braves. The following week would see the newly renamed Rochester Braves face the Shamrocks in a rematch in Silver Stadium. The second half was delayed 40 minutes by Braves players demanding back pay. The game was finished; the Braves lost, 13–0; the franchise folded immediately afterward. Coach Don Irwin joined the New York Yankees, while co-coach Red Badgro returned to the NFL's Brooklyn Dodgers to finish the season.

Two weeks later, another AFL team made the trek to Silver Stadium to call it home: the Brooklyn Tigers, having spent most of the 1936 season as a traveling team, became Rochester's third professional football team and continued as the Rochester Tigers in 1937.

Team	Year	W	L	T	Finish	Coach
Syracuse Braves^{*}	1936	1	6	0	6th (AFL)	Don Irwin, Red Badgro

^{*} 0–1 as Rochester Braves in 1936
