= Boston Shamrocks (AFL) =

Professional American football team (1936–38)

General information
- Founded: 1936
- Folded: 1938
- Stadium: Braves Field; Fenway Park
- Headquartered: Boston
- Colors: Green, gold

Personnel
- Head coach: George Kenneally

Team history
- Boston Shamrocks (1936–37)

League / conference affiliations
- American Football League (1936–37)

Championships
- AFL 2 Championships: 1; 1936

The Boston Shamrocks were a professional American football team based in Boston, Massachusetts. The team played in the second American Football League from 1936 to 1937, followed by at least one year as an independent in 1938. The team was coached by George Kenneally and split its games between Braves Field and Fenway Park.

The Shamrocks were a successful franchise in the AFL, outdrawing the NFL's Boston Redskins and prompting George Preston Marshall to move the Redskins to Washington, D.C., where the team remains. During the 1936 American Football League season, the Shamrocks won the league's championship. The Shamrocks did not fare so well in 1937, falling to a 2–7 record that year. During that year, the team managed to sign former Heisman Trophy winner Larry Kelley to a one-game contract; Kelley reneged on the deal and never played.

After the failure of the second AFL (and no apparent effort to join the succeeding minor leagues), the Shamrocks continued as an independent, picking up mostly players that had been released from the Pittsburgh Pirates (now the Pittsburgh Steelers). The Steelers, led by Byron White, defeated the Shamrocks 16–6 that year.
