= Forbes list of the most valuable MLS clubs =

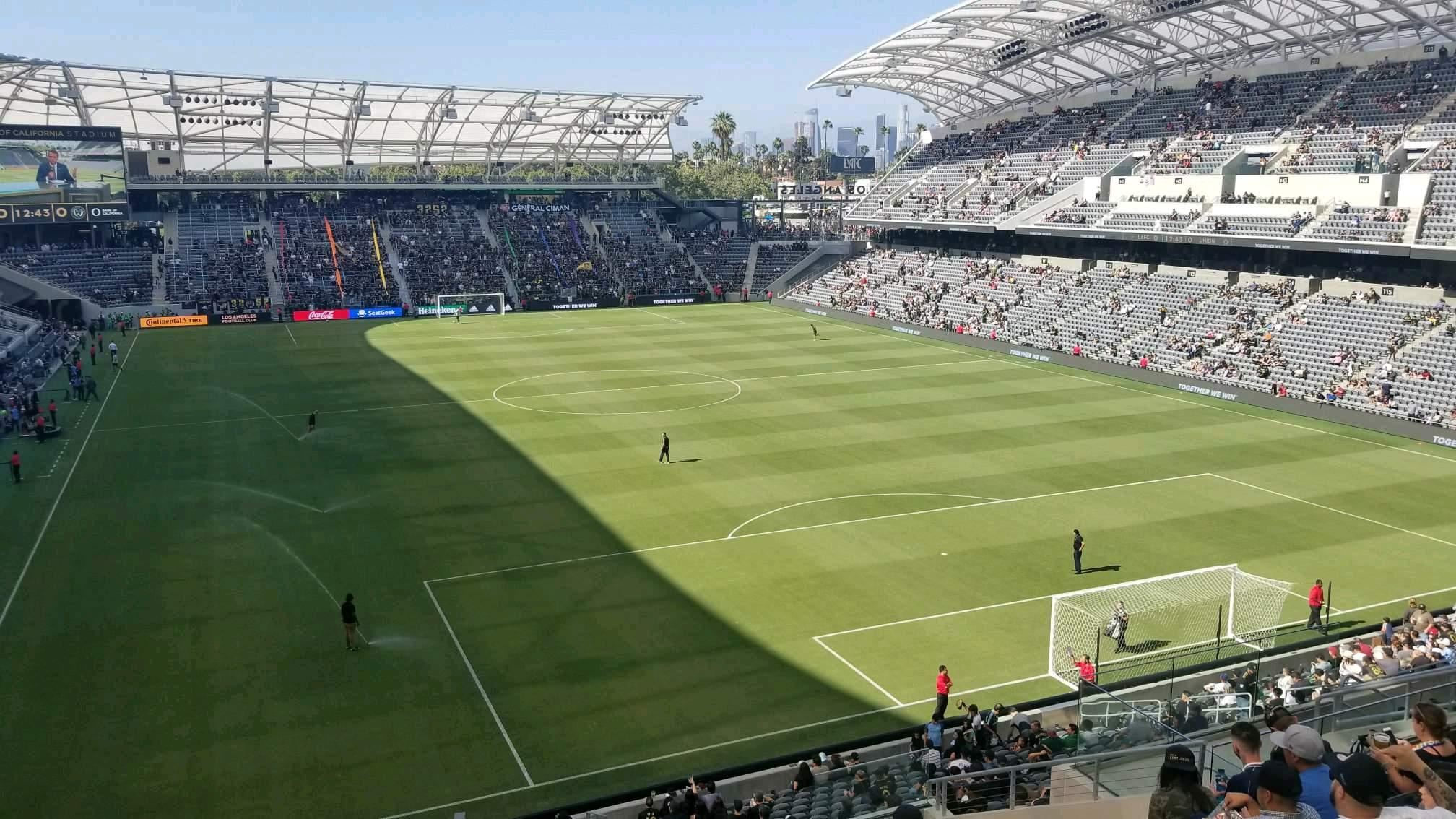
The official stadium of Los Angeles FC, the most valuable MLS club as of the 2024 Major League Soccer season.

Forbes compiles the finances of all 29 (Note: Expansion club San Diego FC, which began play during the 2025 Major League Soccer season, was omitted from the ranking.) MLS clubs to produce an annual ranking of the best franchises in terms of valuation. The valuations are composed of various variables in financial information and transaction data reported by several club executives. These areas are supported by applying financial metrics such as revenue and operating income to each one.

The latest ranking reported that Los Angeles FC is the most valuable MLS franchise after the 2024 Major League Soccer season. The fastest growing MLS franchise is Inter Miami CF with a 17% increase in valuation since the 2023 Major League Soccer season, largely in part by the widespread popularity of Argentine superstar and 2024 MLS Most Valuable Player Lionel Messi. Los Angeles FC became the new club for highest valuation after Atlanta United FC held the position in 2019.

Several media outlets have referenced in related news or conducted analytic journalism when the ranking come out, such as The Cincinnati Enquirer and American City Business Journals. MLS has consistently recognized the renditions of the ranking. The report has also applied more context to MLS trends, such as the decrease in valuation in relationship with the decrease in attendance for Chicago Fire FC.

== Ranking ==
Rankings as of June 10, 2025 (2025 Major League Soccer season)

Rank	Swing	Club	State/ province	Value (Note: Value of team (in USD) based on current stadium deal (unless new stadium is pending), without deduction for debt (other than stadium debt).)	Change (Note: Change of valuation from the 2023 Major League Soccer season to the 2024 Major League Soccer season.)	Revenue (Note: Revenue in USD.)	Operating income (Note: Earnings (in USD) before interest, taxes, depreciation and amortization.)
1	Steady	Los Angeles FC	California	$1.25 billion	▲4%	$150 million	$12 million
2	Steady	Inter Miami CF	Florida	$1.2 billion	▲17%	$180 million	$50 million
3	Steady	LA Galaxy	California	$1 billion	▲5%	$102 million	$2 million
4	Steady	Atlanta United FC	Georgia	$975 million	▲8%	$105 million	$10 million
5	Steady	New York City FC	New York	$875 million	▲3%	$78 million	–$8 million
6	▲2	Austin FC	Texas	$825 million	▲10%	$90 million	$4 million
7	▼1	Seattle Sounders FC	Washington	$800 million	▲2%	$83 million	$2 million
8	▼1	D.C. United	District of Columbia	$785 million	▲1%	$90 million	$10 million
9	▲6	Columbus Crew	Ohio	$735 million	▲15%	$74 million	–$10 million
10	▲4	FC Cincinnati	Ohio	$730 million	▲12%	$76 million	$3 million
11	▼2	Toronto FC	Ontario	$725 million	0%	$70 million	–$12 million
12	▼2	Charlotte FC	North Carolina	$700 million	▲1%	$81 million	$4 million
13	▼1	Philadelphia Union	Pennsylvania	$690 million	▲3%	$72 million	–$8 million
14	▼3	St. Louis City SC	Missouri	$685 million	▲1%	$75 million	–$2 million
15	▼2	Portland Timbers	Oregon	$670 million	▲2%	$68 million	$1 million
16	Steady	Sporting Kansas City	Kansas	$650 million	▲3%	$75 million	–$2 million
17	Steady	Minnesota United FC	Minnesota	$610 million	▲2%	$63 million	–$12 million
18	▲1	New York Red Bulls	New Jersey	$580 million	▲4%	$64 million	–$5 million
19	▼1	Nashville SC	Tennessee	$570 million	0%	$53 million	–$8 million
20	Steady	Houston Dynamo FC	Texas	$550 million	▲4%	$58 million	–$2 million
21	▲3	FC Dallas	Texas	$545 million	▲9%	$54 million	–$15 million
22	▲1	San Jose Earthquakes	California	$540 million	▲7%	$59 million	–$10 million
23	▼2	New England Revolution	Massachusetts	$535 million	▲3%	$63 million	$5 million
24	▼2	Chicago Fire FC	Illinois	$530 million	▲3%	$51 million	$2 million
25	Steady	Real Salt Lake	Utah	$500 million	▲3%	$50 million	$0
26	Steady	Orlando City SC	Florida	$475 million	0%	$50 million	–$3 million
27	▲1	Vancouver Whitecaps FC	British Columbia	$440 million	▲5%	$40 million	–$10 million
28	▼1	CF Montréal	Quebec	$435 million	▲1%	$45 million	–$7 million
29	Steady	Colorado Rapids	Colorado	$415 million	▲4%	$42 million	–$8 million

== Historical valuations ==
Historical valuations (in US$ millions) by MLS club (Note: Financial data taken from the 2025 and 2019 Forbes valuations articles.)
Club	2024	2018
Los Angeles FC	1,250	475
Inter Miami CF	1,200	New entry
LA Galaxy	1,000	480
Atlanta United FC	975	500
New York City FC	875	385
Austin FC	825	405
Seattle Sounders FC	800	330
D.C. United	785	New entry
Columbus Crew	735	395
FC Cincinnati	730	New entry
Toronto FC	725	New entry
Charlotte FC	700	240
Philadelphia Union	690	390
St. Louis City SC	685	285
Portland Timbers	670	200
Sporting Kansas City	650	325
Minnesota United FC	610	300
New York Red Bulls	580	New entry
Nashville SC	570	290
Houston Dynamo FC	550	280
FC Dallas	545	245
San Jose Earthquakes	540	335
New England Revolution	535	275
Chicago Fire FC	530	220
Real Salt Lake	500	235
Orlando City SC	475	295
Vancouver Whitecaps FC	440	210
CF Montréal	435	215
Colorado Rapids	415	190

== See also ==
- Forbes list of the most valuable sports teams
- Forbes list of the most valuable MLB teams
- Forbes list of the most valuable NBA teams
- Forbes list of the most valuable NFL teams
- Forbes list of the most valuable NHL teams
- List of professional sports leagues by revenue
