= Forbes list of the most valuable MLB teams =

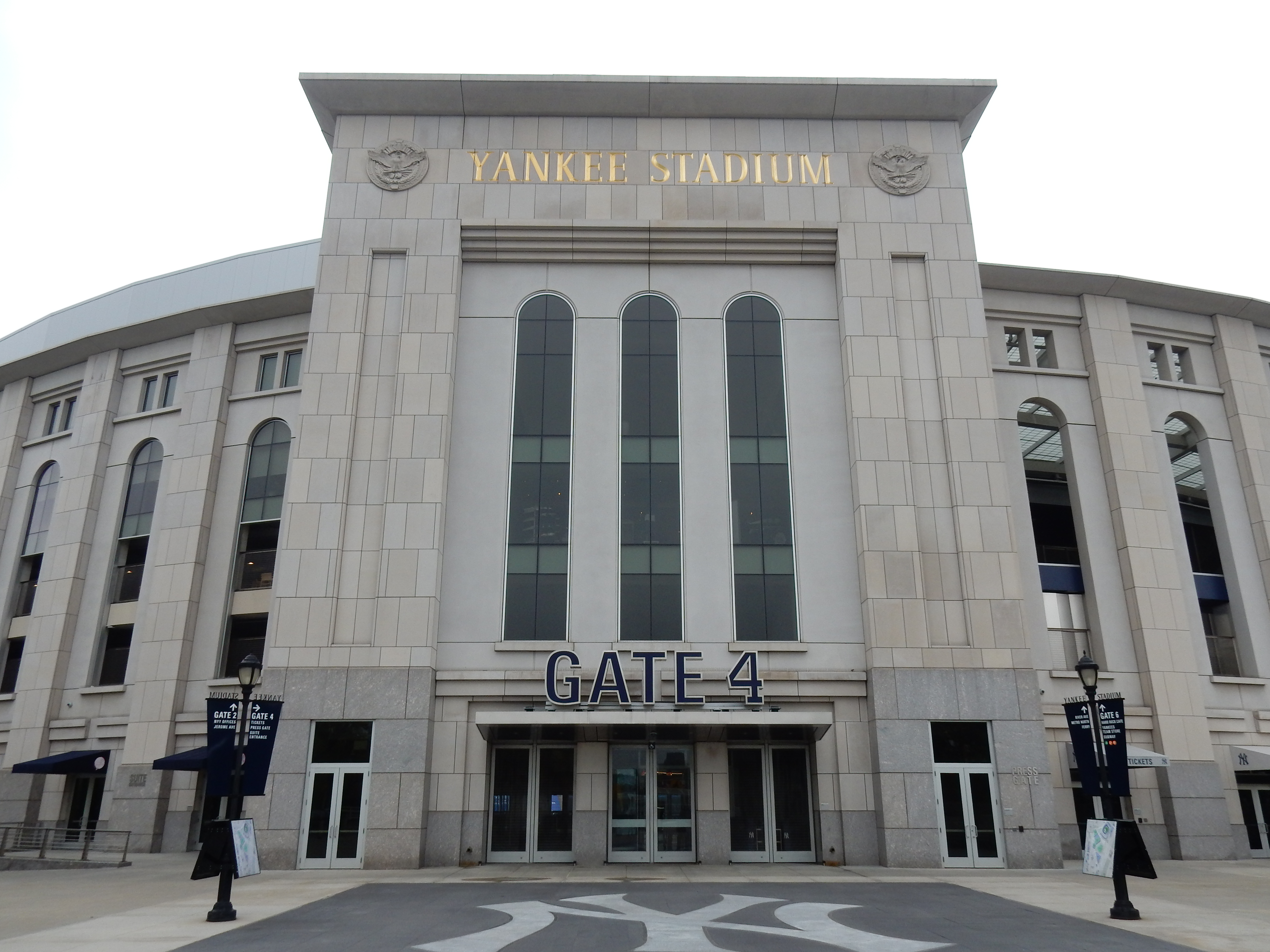
Yankee Stadium, home to the New York Yankees, the most valuable MLB team as of the 2025 MLB season.

Forbes compiles the finances of all 30 MLB teams to produce an annual ranking of the best franchises in terms of valuation. The valuations are composed of the monetary worth of the sport, market, stadium deals, and brand. These areas are supported by applying financial metrics such as debt and operating income to each one.

The latest ranking reported that the New York Yankees are the most valuable MLB franchise. The Yankees have held the crown for the most valuable MLB franchise since the inaugural ranking in 1998 and are now worth an estimated $8.5 billion. The fastest growing MLB franchise is the Athletics, with a 50% increase in valuation to $1.8 billion, even though they are playing in a minor league ballpark in West Sacramento for three seasons prior to their move to Las Vegas.

Several media outlets have referenced in related news or conducts analytic journalism when the ranking comes out, such as USA Today and Yahoo!. MLB has recognized the renditions of the ranking in financial documents, although not publicly. The report has also applied more context to MLB trends, such as the root of the 2021–22 MLB lockout being that owners were getting more money while players/employees were getting less despite growing valuations. This was further illustrated by the next edition of the ranking after the lockout, where nearly every MLB franchise has been growing, although MLB is decidedly the slowest among the "Big Four" leagues along with MLS.

== Ranking ==
Rankings as of October 8, 2026 (2026 MLB season)

Rank	Swing (Note: Movement of spots in the ranking from the 2018 MLB season to the 2022 MLB season.)	Team	State/ Province	Value (Note: Value of team (in USD) based on current stadium deal (unless new stadium is pending), without deduction for debt (other than stadium debt).)	Change (Note: Change of valuation from the 2018 MLB season to the 2022 MLB season.)	Revenue (Note: Revenue in USD.)	Operating income (Note: Earnings (in USD) before interest, taxes, depreciation and amortization.)
1	Steady	New York Yankees	New York	$8.5 billion	▲4%	$710 million	–$53 million
2	Steady	Los Angeles Dodgers	California	$7.8 billion	▲15%	$850 million	–$20 million
3	Steady	Boston Red Sox	Massachusetts	$5.25 billion	▲9%	$567 million	$78 million
4	Steady	Chicago Cubs	Illinois	$5.0 billion	▲9%	$599 million	$58 million
5	Steady	San Francisco Giants	California	$4.05 billion	▲1%	$477 million	$54 million
6	Steady	New York Mets	New York	$3.5 billion	▲9%	$553 million	–$213 million
7	Steady	Philadelphia Phillies	Pennsylvania	$3.4 billion	▲10%	$539 million	–$52 million
8	Steady	Atlanta Braves	Georgia	$3.35 billion	▲12%	$524 million	$27 million
9	Steady	Houston Astros	Texas	$3.2 billion	▲14%	$464 million	–$45 million
10	▲7	San Diego Padres	California	$3.1 billion	▲59%	$452 million	–$1 million
11	▼1	Los Angeles Angels	California	$2.8 billion	▲2%	$377 million	–$14 million
12	▼1	St. Louis Cardinals	Missouri	$2.75 billion	▲8%	$350 million	$33 million
13	▼1	Texas Rangers	Texas	$2.7 billion	▲10%	$398 million	–$44 million
14	Steady	Toronto Blue Jays	Ontario	$2.5 billion	▲16%	$445 million	–$71 million
15	▼2	Seattle Mariners	Washington	$2.35 billion	▲7%	$390 million	$24 million
16	▲1	Washington Nationals	District of Columbia	$2.15 billion	▲2%	$215 million	–$15 million
17	▲1	Baltimore Orioles	Maryland	$2.1 billion	▲11%	$355 million	$23 million
18	▲1	Athletics	California	$2 billion	▲11%	$320 million	$45 million
19	▲2	Arizona Diamondbacks	Arizona	$1.96 billion	▲23%	$234 million	–$31 million
20	▼4	Chicago White Sox	Illinois	$1.94 billion	▼3%	$239 million	–$40 million
21	▼1	Milwaukee Brewers	Wisconsin	$1.9 billion	▲12%	$354 million	$47 million
22	Steady	Detroit Tigers	Michigan	$1.8 billion	▲16%	$363 million	$27 million
23	Steady	Minnesota Twins	Minnesota	$1.71 billion	▲14%	$315 million	$11 million
24	▲5	Tampa Bay Rays	Florida	$1.7 billion	▲36%	$290 million	$31 million
25	▼1	Colorado Rockies	Colorado	$1.68 billion	▲14%	$319 million	$20 million
26	▼1	Cleveland Guardians	Ohio	$1.68 billion	▲14%	$337 million	$53 million
27	▲2	Kansas City Royals	Missouri	$1.64 billion	▲26%	$330 million	$25 million
28	Steady	Pittsburgh Pirates	Pennsylvania	$1.62 billion	▲20%	$330 million	$48 million
29	▲2	Cincinnati Reds	Ohio	$1.6 billion	▲21%	$336 million	$26 million
30	Steady	Miami Marlins	Florida	$1.5 billion	▲43%	$320 million	$53 million

== Composition ==
A pie chart that represents the composition of valuation for the average MLB team.
1. Sport (28.5%)
2. Market (40.1%)
3. Stadium (19.5%)
4. Brand (11.9%)

Team (Note: Financial data taken from each team profile on Forbes.)	Value	Sport (Note: Portion of franchise's value attributable to revenue shared among all teams.)	Market (Note: Portion of franchise's value attributable to its city and market size.)	Stadium (Note: Portion of franchise's value attributable to its arena.)	Brand (Note: Portion of franchise's value attributable to its brand.)
New York Yankees	$7.1 billion	$0.735 billion	$3.466 billion	$1.929 billion	$0.970 billion
Los Angeles Dodgers	$4.8 billion	$0.558 billion	$2.449 billion	$1.062 billion	$0.731 billion
Boston Red Sox	$4.5 billion	$0.609 billion	$2.067 billion	$1.197 billion	$0.626 billion
Chicago Cubs	$4.1 billion	$0.544 billion	$1.897 billion	$1.144 billion	$0.515 billion
San Francisco Giants	$3.7 billion	$0.609 billion	$1.630 billion	$0.992 billion	$0.469 billion
New York Mets	$2.9 billion	$0.614 billion	$1.186 billion	$0.696 billion	$0.404 billion
Los Angeles Angels	$2.7 billion	$0.542 billion	$1.286 billion	$0.537 billion	$0.334 billion
Atlanta Braves	$2.6 billion	$0.417 billion	$1.188 billion	$0.650 billion	$0.345 billion
Philadelphia Phillies	$2.575 billion	$0.483 billion	$1.208 billion	$0.528 billion	$0.355 billion
St. Louis Cardinals	$2.55 billion	$0.534 billion	$1.092 billion	$0.580 billion	$0.344 billion
Houston Astros	$2.25 billion	$0.390 billion	$1.012 billion	$0.563 billion	$0.285 billion
Texas Rangers	$2.225 billion	$0.448 billion	$0.973 billion	$0.505 billion	$0.299 billion
Seattle Mariners	$2.2 billion	$0.522 billion	$1.003 billion	$0.405 billion	$0.269 billion
Toronto Blue Jays	$2.1 billion	$0.566 billion	$0.852 billion	$0.430 billion	$0.252 billion
Chicago White Sox	$2.05 billion	$0.588 billion	$0.830 billion	$0.383 billion	$0.249 billion
Washington Nationals	$2 billion	$0.445 billion	$0.834 billion	$0.506 billion	$0.216 billion
San Diego Padres	$1.75 billion	$0.472 billion	$0.678 billion	$0.391 billion	$0.210 billion
Baltimore Orioles	$1.713 billion	$0.754 billion	$0.591 billion	$0.188 billion	$0.180 billion
Milwaukee Brewers	$1.605 billion	$0.532 billion	$0.543 billion	$0.359 billion	$0.171 billion
Colorado Rockies	$1.475 billion	$0.491 billion	$0.569 billion	$0.253 billion	$0.162 billion
Detroit Tigers	$1.45 billion	$0.530 billion	$0.536 billion	$0.216 billion	$0.167 billion
Minnesota Twins	$1.39 billion	$0.537 billion	$0.481 billion	$0.231 billion	$0.141 billion
Arizona Diamondbacks	$1.38 billion	$0.521 billion	$0.503 billion	$0.210 billion	$0.146 billion
Pittsburgh Pirates	$1.32 billion	$0.564 billion	$0.452 billion	$0.168 billion	$0.136 billion
Cleveland Guardians	$1.3 billion	$0.501 billion	$0.471 billion	$0.175 billion	$0.153 billion
Tampa Bay Rays	$1.25 billion	$0.585 billion	$0.404 billion	$0.138 billion	$0.123 billion
Kansas City Royals	$1.2 billion	$0.504 billion	$0.385 billion	$0.197 billion	$0.114 billion
Cincinnati Reds	$1.19 billion	$0.492 billion	$0.405 billion	$0.170 billion	$0.123 billion
Oakland Athletics (now Athletics)	$1.18 billion	$0.490 billion	$0.421 billion	$0.147 billion	$0.122 billion
Miami Marlins	$1 billion	$0.505 billion	$0.281 billion	$0.114 billion	$0.100 billion

== Historical valuations ==
Historical valuations (in US$ millions) by MLB team
Team	2022	2021	2020	2019	2018	2017	2016	2015	2014	2013	2012
New York Yankees	7,100	6,000	5,300	5,000	4,600	4,000	3,700	3,400	3,200	2,500	2,300
Los Angeles Dodgers	4,800	4,075	3,600	3,400	3,300	3,000	2,800	2,500	2,400	2,000	1,600
Boston Red Sox	4,500	3,900	3,500	3,300	3,200	2,800	2,700	2,300	2,100	1,500	1,300
Chicago Cubs	4,100	3,800	3,400	3,200	3,100	2,900	2,700	2,200	1,800	1,200	1,000
San Francisco Giants	3,700	3,500	3,200	3,100	3,000	2,900	2,700	2,300	2,000	1,000	786
New York Mets	2,900	2,650	2,500	2,400	2,300	2,100	2,000	1,700	1,400	800	811
Los Angeles Angels	2,700	2,200	2,000	2,000	1,900	1,800	1,800	1,300	1,300	775	718
Atlanta Braves	2,600	2,100	1,900	1,800	1,700	1,600	1,500	1,200	1,200	730	629
Philadelphia Phillies	2,575	2,300	2,100	2,000	1,900	1,700	1,700	1,200	1,300	975	893
St. Louis Cardinals	2,550	2,450	2,200	2,200	2,100	1,900	1,800	1,600	1,400	820	716
Houston Astros	2,250	1,980	1,900	1,900	1,800	1,700	1,500	1,100	800	530	626
Texas Rangers	2,225	2,050	1,800	1,800	1,700	1,600	1,600	1,200	1,200	825	764
Seattle Mariners	2,200	1,700	1,600	1,600	1,600	1,500	1,400	1,200	1,100	710	644
Toronto Blue Jays	2,100	1,780	1,700	1,600	1,500	1,400	1,300	900	870	610	568
Chicago White Sox	2,050	1,760	1,700	1,700	1,600	1,500	1,400	1,100	975	695	692
Washington Nationals	2,000	2,000	1,900	1,900	1,800	1,700	1,600	1,300	1,300	700	631
San Diego Padres	1,750	1,575	1,500	1,500	1,400	1,300	1,100	890	890	615	600
Baltimore Orioles	1,713	1,375	1,400	1,400	1,300	1,200	1,200	1,000	1,000	620	618
Milwaukee Brewers	1,605	1,280	1,200	1,200	1,200	1,000	925	875	875	565	562
Colorado Rockies	1,475	1,385	1,300	1,300	1,200	1,100	1,000	860	855	575	537
Detroit Tigers	1,450	1,400	1,300	1,300	1,300	1,200	1,200	1,200	1,100	680	643
Minnesota Twins	1,390	1,390	1,300	1,300	1,200	1,200	1,000	910	895	605	578
Arizona Diamondbacks	1,380	1,380	1,300	1,300	1,300	1,200	1,200	925	840	585	584
Pittsburgh Pirates	1,320	1,320	1,300	1,300	1,300	1,300	1,300	975	900	572	479
Cleveland Guardians	1,300	1,300	1,200	1,200	1,200	1,000	920	800	825	570	559
Tampa Bay Rays	1,250	1,100	1,100	1,100	1,000	900	825	650	625	485	451
Kansas City Royals	1,200	1,110	1,100	1,000	1,000	1,000	950	865	700	490	457
Cincinnati Reds	1,190	1,190	1,100	1,100	1,100	1,000	915	905	885	600	546
Athletics	1,180	1,180	1,100	1,100	1,100	1,000	880	725	725	495	468
Miami Marlins	1,000	990	990	980	1,000	1,000	940	675	650	500	520

== See also ==
- Forbes list of the most valuable sports teams
- Forbes list of the most valuable MLS clubs
- Forbes list of the most valuable NBA teams
- Forbes list of the most valuable NFL teams
- Forbes list of the most valuable NHL teams
- List of professional sports leagues by revenue
