= Forbes list of the most valuable NHL teams =

Forbes compiles the finances of all 32 NHL teams to produce an annual ranking of the best franchises in terms of valuation. The valuations are composed of the monetary worth of the sport, market, stadium deals, and brand. These areas are supported by applying various financial metrics such as debt and operating income to each one.

The latest ranking reported that the Toronto Maple Leafs were the most valuable NHL franchise for the third straight year, rising 16% to an estimated $4.4 billion. The New York Rangers held the title for eight consecutive years prior to the 2021–22 NHL season. The Maple Leafs and the Rangers are the only two franchises worth at least $4 billion, with a league average of $2.2 billion. The fastest growing NHL franchise is the Carolina Hurricanes, with a 60% increase in valuation over the past season ($1.25 billion to $2 billion).

Several media outlets, such as CBS and Bleacher Report, have referenced the report and analyzed the results when they come out. The NHL has consistently published news about the rankings since the early renditions. The report has also applied more context to NHL trends, such as the Edmonton Oilers doubling in value in just one year. (The Oilers have recently been consistently clinching the playoffs, moved into their new arena and made new media deals).

== Ranking ==
Rankings as of December 11, 2025, based on the 2024–25 NHL season. (Note: All figures are in U.S. dollars based on the average U.S.-Canada exchange rate during the 2024-25 season (1 CAD = 0.73 USD).)

Rank	Swing (Note: Movement of spots in the ranking from the 2023–24 NHL season to the 2024–25 NHL season.)	Team	Province/State	Value (Note: Team values are rounded to the nearest $25 million.)	Change (Note: Change of valuation from the 2023–24 NHL season to the 2024–25 NHL season.)	Revenue (Note: Revenue and operating income estimates are rounded to the nearest $1 million.)	Operating Income
1	Steady	Toronto Maple Leafs	Ontario	$4.4 billion	▲16%	$375 million	$191 million
2	Steady	New York Rangers	New York	$4 billion	▲14%	$322 million	$182 million
3	Steady	Montreal Canadiens	Quebec	$3.4 billion	▲13%	$320 million	$136 million
4	▲2	Edmonton Oilers	Alberta	$3.2 billion	▲21%	$431 million	$244 million
5	▼1	Los Angeles Kings	California	$3.1 billion	▲7%	$333 million	$129 million
6	▼1	Boston Bruins	Massachusetts	$2.9 billion	▲7%	$275 million	$73 million
7	Steady	Chicago Blackhawks	Illinois	$2.8 billion	▲14%	$272 million	$95 million
8	Steady	Philadelphia Flyers	Pennsylvania	$2.7 billion	▲17%	$315 million	$124 million
9	Steady	Washington Capitals	District of Columbia	$2.55 billion	▲19%	$282 million	$92 million
10	Steady	Detroit Red Wings	Michigan	$2.5 billion	▲18%	$250 million	$69 million
11	Steady	New Jersey Devils	New Jersey	$2.4 billion	▲14%	$303 million	$98 million
12	Steady	Dallas Stars	Texas	$2.3 billion	▲15%	$250 million	$70 million
13	▲2	Vegas Golden Knights	Nevada	$2.2 billion	▲19%	$250 million	$77 million
14	▼1	Vancouver Canucks	British Columbia	$2.15 billion	▲10%	$235 million	$55 million
15	▼1	New York Islanders	New York	$2.1 billion	▲11%	$220 million	$50 million
16	Steady	Tampa Bay Lightning	Florida	$2.05 billion	▲14%	$240 million	$60 million
17	▲10	Carolina Hurricanes	North Carolina	$2 billion	▲60%	$218 million	$41 million
18	Steady	Colorado Avalanche	Colorado	$1.95 billion	▲15%	$222 million	$47 million
19	Steady	Calgary Flames	Alberta	$1.9 billion	▲15%	$210 million	$70 million
20	Steady	Seattle Kraken	Washington	$1.85 billion	▲16%	$235 million	$66 million
21	Steady	Minnesota Wild	Minnesota	$1.8 billion	▲16%	$240 million	$68 million
22	▼5	Pittsburgh Penguins	Pennsylvania	$1.75 billion	0%	$230 million	$60 million
23	▲1	Florida Panthers	Florida	$1.7 billion	▲21%	$230 million	$45 million
24	▼2	Nashville Predators	Tennessee	$1.6 billion	▲7%	$203 million	$35 million
25	▼2	St. Louis Blues	Missouri	$1.55 billion	▲7%	$208 million	$20 million
26	▼1	San Jose Sharks	California	$1.5 billion	▲11%	$182 million	$28 million
27	▲1	Utah Mammoth	Utah	$1.45 billion	▲21%	$195 million	$32 million
28	▼2	Anaheim Ducks	California	$1.4 billion	▲8%	$185 million	$26 million
29	Steady	Ottawa Senators	Ontario	$1.375 billion	▲20%	$181 million	$21 million
30	▲1	Winnipeg Jets	Manitoba	$1.35 billion	▲29%	$187 million	$26 million
31	▼1	Buffalo Sabres	New York	$1.325 billion	▲20%	$175 million	$11 million
32	Steady	Columbus Blue Jackets	Ohio	$1.3 billion	▲30%	$161 million	$19 million

== Composition ==
A pie chart that represents the composition of valuation for the average NHL team.
1. Sport (25.8%)
2. Market (38.3%)
3. Stadium (23.6%)
4. Brand (12.3%)

Team (Note: Financial data taken from 2023 team profiles on Forbes.)	Value	Sport (Note: Portion of franchise's value attributable to revenue shared among all teams.)	Market (Note: Portion of franchise's value attributable to its city and market size.)	Stadium (Note: Portion of franchise's value attributable to its arena.)	Brand (Note: Portion of franchise's value attributable to its brand.)
New York Rangers	$2.2 billion	$0.252 billion	$1.038 billion	$0.632 billion	$0.279 billion
Toronto Maple Leafs	$2 billion	$0.239 billion	$0.937 billion	$0.536 billion	$0.289 billion
Montreal Canadiens	$1.85 billion	$0.239 billion	$0.944 billion	$0.427 billion	$0.241 billion
Chicago Blackhawks	$1.5 billion	$0.23 billion	$0.679 billion	$0.407 billion	$0.184 billion
Boston Bruins	$1.4 billion	$0.22 billion	$0.581 billion	$0.42 billion	$0.179 billion
Los Angeles Kings	$1.3 billion	$0.149 billion	$0.535 billion	$0.446 billion	$0.171 billion
Edmonton Oilers	$1.275 billion	$0.186 billion	$0.605 billion	$0.295 billion	$0.189 billion
Philadelphia Flyers	$1.25 billion	$0.24 billion	$0.501 billion	$0.365 billion	$0.145 billion
Washington Capitals	$1.2 billion	$0.214 billion	$0.52 billion	$0.286 billion	$0.18 billion
Seattle Kraken	$1.05 billion	$0.191 billion	$0.428 billion	$0.272 billion	$0.159 billion
Detroit Red Wings	$1.03 billion	$0.245 billion	$0.411 billion	$0.228 billion	$0.146 billion
New York Islanders	$1.02 billion	$0.206 billion	$0.412 billion	$0.268 billion	$0.134 billion
Vancouver Canucks	$1.01 billion	$0.24 billion	$0.433 billion	$0.202 billion	$0.135 billion
Tampa Bay Lightning	$1 billion	$0.238 billion	$0.379 billion	$0.272 billion	$0.111 billion
Pittsburgh Penguins	$0.99 billion	$0.194 billion	$0.4 billion	$0.256 billion	$0.141 billion
Vegas Golden Knights	$0.965 billion	$0.168 billion	$0.407 billion	$0.268 billion	$0.123 billion
New Jersey Devils	$0.96 billion	$0.209 billion	$0.359 billion	$0.271 billion	$0.121 billion
Dallas Stars	$0.925 billion	$0.22 billion	$0.383 billion	$0.198 billion	$0.124 billion
St. Louis Blues	$0.88 billion	$0.252 billion	$0.313 billion	$0.203 billion	$0.112 billion
Colorado Avalanche	$0.86 billion	$0.249 billion	$0.302 billion	$0.199 billion	$0.11 billion
Calgary Flames	$0.855 billion	$0.247 billion	$0.346 billion	$0.166 billion	$0.096 billion
Minnesota Wild	$0.85 billion	$0.258 billion	$0.296 billion	$0.195 billion	$0.101 billion
Nashville Predators	$0.81 billion	$0.257 billion	$0.266 billion	$0.19 billion	$0.096 billion
Ottawa Senators	$0.8 billion	$0.293 billion	$0.238 billion	$0.152 billion	$0.116 billion
San Jose Sharks	$0.74 billion	$0.293 billion	$0.221 billion	$0.168 billion	$0.057 billion
Anaheim Ducks	$0.725 billion	$0.263 billion	$0.224 billion	$0.147 billion	$0.091 billion
Winnipeg Jets	$0.65 billion	$0.26 billion	$0.203 billion	$0.124 billion	$0.063 billion
Carolina Hurricanes	$0.64 billion	$0.223 billion	$0.214 billion	$0.128 billion	$0.075 billion
Buffalo Sabres	$0.61 billion	$0.263 billion	$0.193 billion	$0.1 billion	$0.053 billion
Florida Panthers	$0.55 billion	$0.247 billion	$0.156 billion	$0.096 billion	$0.052 billion
Arizona Coyotes (now inactive)	$0.45 billion	$0.236 billion	$0.117 billion	$0.061 billion	$0.036 billion

== Historical valuations ==
Historical valuations (in US$ millions) by NHL team
Team	2023–24	2022–23	2021–22	2020–21	2019–20	2018–19	2017–18	2016–17	2015–16	2014–15	2013–14	2012–13
Toronto Maple Leafs	3,800	2,800	2,000	1,800	1,500	1,500	1,500	1,400	1,100	1,200	1,300	1,200
New York Rangers	3,500	2,650	2,200	2,000	1,700	1,700	1,600	1,500	1,300	1,200	1,100	850
Montreal Canadiens	3,000	2,300	1,850	1,600	1,300	1,300	1,300	1,300	1,100	1,200	1,000	775
Los Angeles Kings	2,900	2,000	1,300	1,025	825	850	810	750	600	580	580	450
Boston Bruins	2,700	1,900	1,400	1,300	1,000	1,000	925	890	800	750	750	600
Edmonton Oilers	2,650	1,850	1,275	1,100	550	575	540	520	445	455	475	400
Chicago Blackhawks	2,450	1,875	1,500	1,400	1,100	1,100	1,100	1,000	925	925	825	625
Philadelphia Flyers	2,300	1,650	1,250	1,200	800	825	800	740	720	660	625	500
Washington Capitals	2,150	1,600	1,200	930	750	775	725	625	575	565	500	414
Detroit Red Wings	2,150	1,200	1,030	990	775	800	775	700	625	600	570	470
New Jersey Devils	2,100	1,450	960	775	530	550	455	400	320	330	330	320
Dallas Stars	2,000	1,080	925	720	575	600	525	515	500	450	420	333
Vancouver Canucks	1,950	1,325	1,010	825	725	740	735	730	700	745	800	700
New York Islanders	1,900	1,550	1,020	950	520	520	440	395	385	325	300	195
Vegas Golden Knights	1,850	1,125	965	710	570	580	575	500	0 (Note: Team did not exist to be attributed a financial valuation.)			
Tampa Bay Lightning	1,800	1,250	1,000	650	470	470	445	390	305	260	230	180
Pittsburgh Penguins	1,750	1,175	990	900	650	665	650	650	570	560	565	480
Colorado Avalanche	1,700	1,150	860	630	465	475	430	385	360	360	360	337
Calgary Flames	1,650	1,100	855	680	480	500	450	430	410	435	451	420
Seattle Kraken	1,600	1,225	1,050	875	0							
Minnesota Wild	1,550	1,050	850	675	500	510	490	440	400	380	370	330
Nashville Predators	1,500	975	810	600	435	460	425	380	270	255	250	205
St. Louis Blues	1,450	990	880	640	510	530	465	450	310	270	235	185
Florida Panthers	1,400	775	550	450	295	310	295	305	235	186	190	240
San Jose Sharks	1,350	900	740	625	515	540	510	490	470	445	425	405
Anaheim Ducks	1,300	925	725	620	460	480	460	460	415	400	365	300
Carolina Hurricanes	1,250	825	640	550	440	450	420	370	230	225	220	187
Utah Mammoth	1,200	0										
Ottawa Senators	1,150	950	800	525	430	445	435	420	355	370	400	380
Buffalo Sabres	1,100	750	610	500	385	400	375	350	300	300	288	250
Winnipeg Jets	1,050	780	650	575	405	420	415	375	340	350	358	340
Columbus Blue Jackets	1,000	765	620	475	310	325	320	315	245	226	200	175
Arizona Coyotes (inactive)	0	500	450	400	285	300	290	300	240	220	225	200

== See also ==
- Forbes list of the most valuable sports teams
- Forbes list of the most valuable MLB teams
- Forbes list of the most valuable MLS clubs
- Forbes list of the most valuable NBA teams
- Forbes list of the most valuable NFL teams
- List of professional sports leagues by revenue
