= Forbes list of the most valuable NFL teams =

The Dallas Cowboys, valued at $17 billion in 2026, are the most valuable sports franchise in the world.

Forbes compiles the finances of all 32 NFL teams to produce an annual ranking of the best franchises in terms of valuation. The valuations are composed of the monetary worth of the sport, market, stadium deals, and brand. These areas are supported by applying financial metrics such as revenue and operating income to each one. The Dallas Cowboys, valued at $17 billion in 2026, has been the NFL's most valuable franchise since 2007 and the most valuable sports franchise in the world since 2016. In the 2025 list updated on November 10, 2025, Forbes valued the Cowboys at $13 billion, followed by the Los Angeles Rams ($10.5 billion) and New York Giants ($10.1 billion) also topping $10 billion, with the average NFL franchise reaching $7.1 billion.

Several media outlets have referenced in related news or conducts analytic journalism when the ranking comes out, such as CBS and Sports Illustrated. The NFL has recognized the annual ranking for the first time after the rendition based on the 2014 NFL season.

== Ranking ==
Rankings as of September 2026

Rank	Swing (Note: Movement of spots in the ranking from the previous year)	Team	State	Value	Change	Revenue	Operating income
1	Steady	Dallas Cowboys	Texas	$17 billion	29%	$1.234 billion	$629 million
2	Steady	Los Angeles Rams	California	$13.5 billion	38%	$764 million	$244 million
3	▲1	New York Giants	New Jersey	$10.1 billion	38%	$707 million	$181 million
4	▼1	New England Patriots	Massachusetts	$9 billion	22%	$762 million	$222 million
5	▲13	San Francisco 49ers	California	$8.6 billion	26%	$723 million	$115 million
6	▲2	Philadelphia Eagles	Pennsylvania	$8.3 billion	26%	$688 million	$117 million
7	▲2	Chicago Bears	Illinois	$8.2 billion	28%	$629 million	$80 million
8	▼3	New York Jets	New Jersey	$8.1 billion	17%	$663 million	$180 million
9	▼2	Las Vegas Raiders	Nevada	$7.7 billion	19%	$832 million	$179 million
10	Steady	Washington Commanders	Maryland	$7.6 billion	21%	$644 million	$116 million
11	Steady	Miami Dolphins	Florida	$7.5 billion	21%	$656 million	$63 million
12	Steady	Houston Texans	Texas	$7.4 billion	21%	$687 million	$156 million
13	▲1	Denver Broncos	Colorado	$6.8 billion	24%	$645 million	$103 million
14	▲1	Seattle Seahawks	Washington	$6.7 billion	23%	$624 million	$143 million
15	▼2	Green Bay Packers	Wisconsin	$6.65 billion	19%	$719 million	$83 million
16	Steady	Tampa Bay Buccaneers	Florida	$6.6 billion	22%	$629 million	$130 million
17	Steady	Pittsburgh Steelers	Pennsylvania	$6.5 billion	23%	$619 million	$137 million
18	▲1	Cleveland Browns	Ohio	$6.4 billion	24%	$685 million	$90 million
19	▼13	Atlanta Falcons	Georgia	$6.35 billion (Note: In August 2026, Arctos Partners agreed to acquire a 10% stake in the Falcons at a $10.6 billion enterprise valuation.)	22%	$612 million	$37 million
20	▲3	Tennessee Titans	Tennessee	$6.3 billion	29%	$582 million	$93 million
21	Steady	Minnesota Vikings	Minnesota	$6.25 billion	24%	$609 million	$70 million
22	▲2	Kansas City Chiefs	Missouri	$6.2 billion	28%	$610 million	$66 million
23	▼1	Baltimore Ravens	Maryland	$6.1 billion	22%	$621 million	$115 million
24	▼4	Los Angeles Chargers	California	$6 billion	18%	$593 million	$105 million
25	▲5	Buffalo Bills	New York	$5.95 billion	42%	$585 million	$104 million
26	▼1	Indianapolis Colts	Indiana	$5.9 billion	23%	$593 million	$109 million
27	Steady	Carolina Panthers	North Carolina	$5.7 billion	27%	$588 million	$36 million
28	▼2	Jacksonville Jaguars	Florida	$5.6 billion	22%	$552 million	$106 million
29	Steady	Arizona Cardinals	Arizona	$5.5 billion	28%	$571 million	$62 million
30	▲1	Detroit Lions	Michigan	$5.4 billion	30%	$585 million	$21 million
31	▼3	New Orleans Saints	Louisiana	$5.3 billion	20%	$607 million	$115 million
32	Steady	Cincinnati Bengals	Ohio	$5.25 billion	28%	$573 million	$50 million

== Historical valuations ==
Historical valuations (in US$ millions) by NFL team (Note: Financial data taken from each team profile on Forbes.)
Team	2023	2022	2021	2020	2019	2018	2017	2016	2015	2014	2013	2012
Dallas Cowboys	10,100	9,000	8,000	6,500	5,700	5,500	5,000	4,800	4,200	4,000	3,200	2,300
New England Patriots	7,400	7,000	6,400	5,000	4,400	4,100	3,800	3,700	3,400	3,200	2,600	1,800
Los Angeles Rams	7,600	6,900	6,200	4,800	4,000	3,800	3,200	3,000	2,900	1,500	930	875
New York Giants	7,300	6,800	6,000	4,850	4,300	3,900	3,300	3,300	3,100	2,800	2,100	1,600
Chicago Bears	6,400	6,300	5,800	4,075	3,500	3,500	2,900	2,900	2,700	2,500	1,700	1,300
Washington Commanders	6,300	6,050	5,600	4,200	3,500	3,400	3,100	3,100	3,000	2,900	2,400	1,700
New York Jets	6,900	6,100	5,400	4,050	3,600	3,200	2,900	2,800	2,800	2,600	1,800	1,400
San Francisco 49ers	6,800	6,000	5,200	4,175	3,800	3,500	3,100	3,100	3,000	2,700	1,600	1,200
Las Vegas Raiders	6,700	6,200	5,100	3,415	3,100	2,900	2,400	2,400	2,100	1,400	970	825
Philadelphia Eagles	6,600	5,800	4,900	3,800	3,400	3,100	2,800	2,700	2,500	2,400	1,800	1,300
Houston Texans	6,100	5,500	4,700	3,700	3,300	3,100	2,800	2,800	2,600	2,500	1,900	1,500
Denver Broncos	5,500	5,100	4,650	3,750	3,200	3,000	2,700	2,600	2,400	1,900	1,500	1,200
Miami Dolphins	6,200	5,700	4,600	3,420	2,900	2,800	2,600	2,600	2,400	1,900	1,300	1,100
Seattle Seahawks	5,450	5,000	4,500	3,500	3,100	2,800	2,600	2,400	2,200	1,900	1,300	1,100
Green Bay Packers	5,600	4,600	4,250	3,475	3,100	2,900	2,600	2,600	2,400	2,000	1,400	1,200
Atlanta Falcons	5,200	4,700	4,000	3,200	2,900	2,800	2,600	2,500	2,100	1,700	1,100	933
Pittsburgh Steelers	5,300	4,630	3,975	3,430	3,000	2,800	2,600	2,500	2,300	1,900	1,400	1,100
Minnesota Vikings	5,050	4,650	3,925	3,350	3,000	2,700	2,400	2,400	2,200	1,600	1,200	1,000
Baltimore Ravens	5,000	4,630	3,900	3,400	3,000	2,800	2,600	2,500	2,300	1,900	1,500	1,200
Los Angeles Chargers	5,100	4,150	3,875	2,920	2,600	2,500	2,300	2,300	2,100	1,500	995	949
Cleveland Browns	5,150	4,620	3,850	2,600	2,400	2,200	2,000	2,000	1,900	1,500	1,100	1,000
Indianapolis Colts	4,800	4,350	3,800	3,250	2,900	2,700	2,400	2,400	2,200	1,900	1,400	1,200
Kansas City Chiefs	4,850	4,300	3,700	2,930	2,500	2,300	2,100	2,100	1,900	1,500	1,100	1,000
Tampa Bay Buccaneers	5,400	4,200	3,675	2,940	2,300	2,200	2,000	2,000	1,800	1,500	1,200	1,100
Carolina Panthers	4,500	4,100	3,600	2,910	2,600	2,400	2,300	2,300	2,100	1,600	1,300	1,100
New Orleans Saints	4,400	4,080	3,575	2,825	2,500	2,300	2,100	2,000	1,800	1,500	1,100	1,000
Tennessee Titans	4,900	4,400	3,500	2,625	2,300	2,200	2,100	2,100	2,000	1,500	1,200	1,100
Jacksonville Jaguars	4,600	4,000	3,475	2,800	2,500	2,300	2,100	2,100	2,000	1,500	965	840
Buffalo Bills	4,200	3,700	3,400	2,270	2,100	1,900	1,600	1,600	1,500	1,400	935	870
Arizona Cardinals	4,300	3,800	3,270	2,650	2,300	2,300	2,200	2,200	2,000	1,500	1,000	961
Detroit Lions	4,150	3,600	3,050	2,400	2,100	2,000	1,700	1,700	1,700	1,400	960	900
Cincinnati Bengals	4,110	3,500	3,000	2,275	2,000	2,000	1,800	1,800	1,700	1,400	990	924

== See also ==
- Forbes' list of the most valuable sports teams
- Forbes list of the most valuable MLB teams
- Forbes list of the most valuable MLS clubs
- Forbes list of the most valuable NBA teams
- Forbes list of the most valuable NHL teams
- List of professional sports leagues by revenue
