= Forbes list of the most valuable NBA teams =

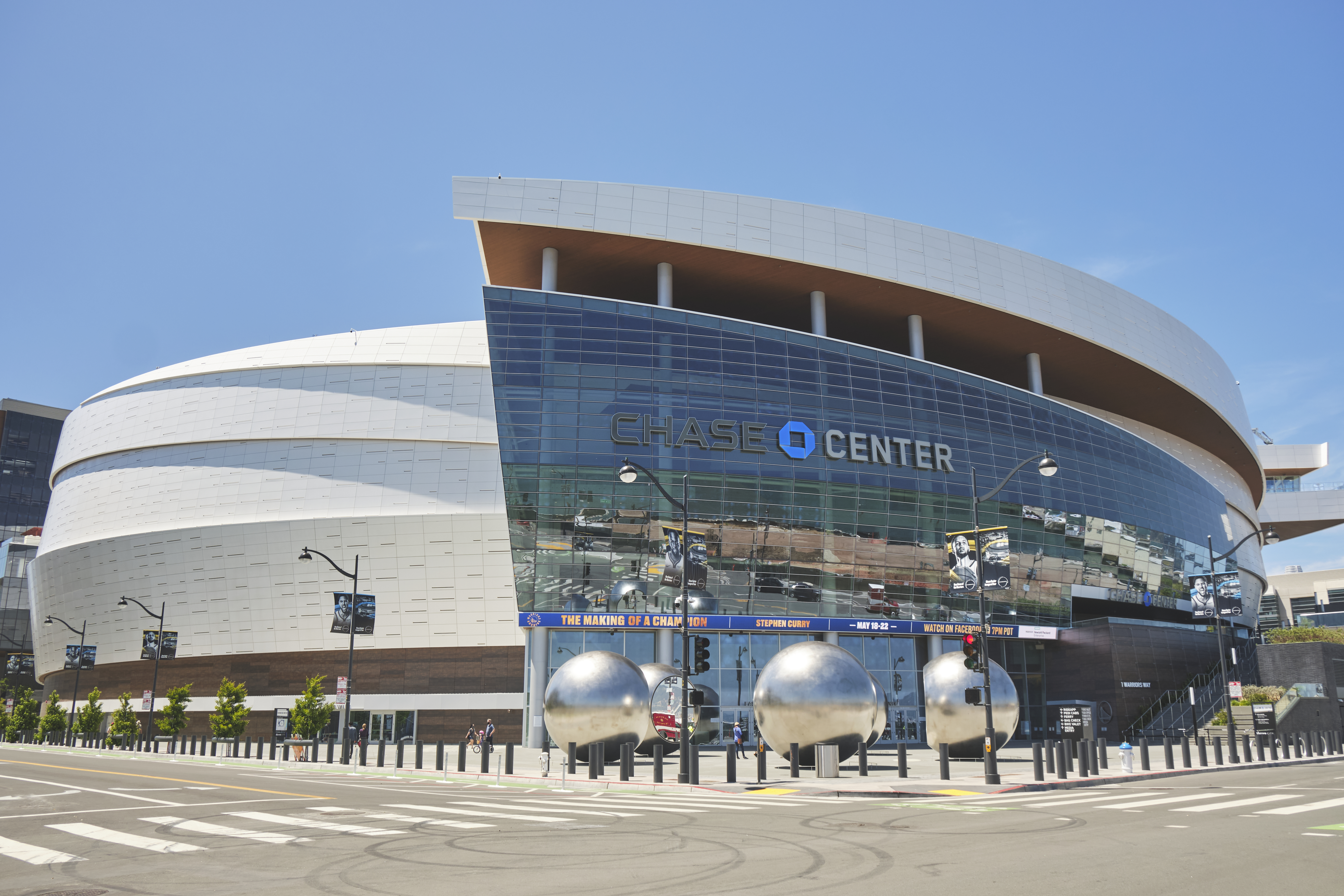
The home arena of the Golden State Warriors, the most valuable NBA team as of the 2025–26 NBA season.

Forbes compiles the finances of all 30 NBA teams to produce an annual ranking of the best franchises in terms of valuation. The latest ranking reported that the Golden State Warriors are the most valuable NBA franchise for the 2025–26 NBA season, the fourth year in a row, with a valuation of $11 billion. All 30 franchises are worth an average of $5.4 billion. The Warriors are one of three NBA teams to hold the title of most valuable franchise since the inception of Forbes' ranking during the 1991–92 NBA season, with the other two being the Los Angeles Lakers and the New York Knicks.

== Ranking ==
Rankings as of January 8, 2026 (2025–26 NBA season)

Rank	Team	State / Province	Value	Change	Revenue	Operating Income
1	Golden State Warriors	California	$11 billion	▲25%	$880 million	$409 million
2	Los Angeles Lakers	California	$10 billion	▲41%	$551 million	$170 million
3	New York Knicks	New York	$9.75 billion	▲30%	$532 million	$98 million
4	Los Angeles Clippers	California	$7.5 billion	▲36%	$569 million	$154 million
5	Boston Celtics	Massachusetts	$6.7 billion	▲12%	$458 million	$116 million
6	Chicago Bulls	Illinois	$6.0 billion	▲20%	$434 million	$160 million
7	Houston Rockets	Texas	$5.9 billion	▲20%	$467 million	$191 million
8	Miami Heat	Florida	$5.7 billion	▲34%	$417 million	$110 million
9	Brooklyn Nets	New York	$5.6 billion	▲17%	$402 million	$50 million
10	Philadelphia 76ers	Pennsylvania	$5.45 billion	▲18%	$472 million	$204 million
11	Phoenix Suns	Arizona	$5.425 billion	▲26%	$455 million	$33 million
12	Toronto Raptors	Ontario	$5.4 billion	▲23%	$380 million	$136 million
13	Dallas Mavericks	Texas	$5.1 billion	▲9%	$407 million	$87 million
14	Atlanta Hawks	Georgia	$5.0 billion	▲32%	$477 million	$203 million
15	Cleveland Cavaliers	Ohio	$4.8 billion	▲22%	$440 million	$127 million
16	Washington Wizards	District of Columbia	$4.7 billion	▲15%	$389 million	$135 million
17	Denver Nuggets	Colorado	$4.6 billion	▲18%	$364 million	$67 million
18	Sacramento Kings	California	$4.45 billion	▲20%	$354 million	$76 million
19	San Antonio Spurs	Texas	$4.4 billion	▲14%	$401 million	$151 million
20	Oklahoma City Thunder	Oklahoma	$4.35 billion	▲19%	$357 million	$114 million
21	Milwaukee Bucks	Wisconsin	$4.3 billion	▲8%	$355 million	$26 million
22	Portland Trail Blazers	Oregon	$4.25 billion	▲21%	$361 million	$111 million
23	Indiana Pacers	Indiana	$4.2 billion	▲17%	$342 million	$89 million
24	Utah Jazz	Utah	$4.1 billion	▲15%	$340 million	$103 million
25	Orlando Magic	Florida	$3.9 billion	▲22%	$318 million	$94 million
26	Charlotte Hornets	North Carolina	$3.8 billion	▲15%	$328 million	$82 million
27	Detroit Pistons	Michigan	$3.65 billion	7%	$321 million	$106 million
28	Minnesota Timberwolves	Minnesota	$3.6 billion	▲16%	$320 million	$41 million
29	New Orleans Pelicans	Louisiana	$3.55 billion	▲16%	$302 million	$78 million
30	Memphis Grizzlies	Tennessee	$3.5 billion	▲17%	$306 million	$28 million

== See also ==
- Forbes list of the most valuable sports teams
- Forbes list of the most valuable MLB teams
- Forbes list of the most valuable MLS clubs
- Forbes list of the most valuable NFL teams
- Forbes list of the most valuable NHL teams
- List of professional sports leagues by revenue
