= Chris Harper =

Chris or Christopher Harper may refer to:

- Christopher J. Harper (born 1951), American journalist
- Sir Chris Harper (RAF officer) (born 1957), British air marshal
- Chris Harper, American creator of the fictional Landover Baptist Church
- Chris Harper (bishop), Canadian Anglican bishop
- Christopher Harper (actor) (born 1977), British actor
- Chris Harper (wide receiver, born 1989), American football wide receiver
- Chris Harper (wide receiver, born 1993), American football wide receiver
- Chris Harper (cyclist) (born 1994), Australian cyclist

== See also ==
- Christopher Harper-Mercer, perpetrator of the 2015 Umpqua Community College shooting
