= Explanatory journalism =

Journalism with greater context

Explanatory journalism or explanatory reporting is a form of reporting that attempts to present ongoing news stories in a more accessible manner by providing greater context than would be presented in traditional news sources. The term is often associated with the explanatory news website Vox, but explanatory reporting (previously explanatory journalism) has also been a Pulitzer Prize category since 1985. Other examples include The Upshot by The New York Times, Bloomberg Quicktake, The Conversation, and FiveThirtyEight.

== Relation to analytic journalism ==
Journalism professor Michael Schudson says explanatory journalism and analytic journalism are the same, because both attempt to "explain a complicated event or process in a comprehensible narrative" and require "intelligence and a kind of pedagogical flair, linking the capacity to understand a complex situation with a knack for transmitting that understanding to a broad public." Schudson says explanatory journalists "aid democracy."

== See also ==
- Analytic journalism
- Investigative journalism
- Narrative journalism
- Opinion journalism
- Pundit
