= Vox (website) =

American news website

- The homepage of Vox as of April 21, 2017
- Website type: News and opinion website
- Available in: English
- Founders: Ezra Klein; Melissa Bell; Matthew Yglesias
- Editor: Swati Sharma
- Parent: Vox Media (Lupa Systems)
- Website: vox.com
- Commercial: Yes
- Registration: Optional
- Launched: April 6, 2014; 12 years ago
- Current status: Active

Vox (from Latin vōx 'voice') is an American news and opinion website owned by Lupa Systems. The website was founded in April 2014 by Ezra Klein, Matt Yglesias, and Melissa Bell as part of Vox Media, and is noted for its concept of explanatory journalism. Vox's media presence also includes a YouTube channel, several podcasts, and a show presented on Netflix. Vox has been described as left-leaning and liberal.

== History ==
Prior to founding Vox, Ezra Klein worked for The Washington Post as the head of Wonkblog, a public policy blog. When Klein attempted to launch a new site using funding from the newspaper's editors, his proposal was turned down and Klein subsequently left The Washington Post for a position with Vox Media, another communications company, in January 2014.

The New York Times' David Carr associated Klein's exit for Vox with other "big-name journalists" leaving newspapers for digital start-ups, such as Walter Mossberg and Kara Swisher (of Recode, which was later acquired by and integrated into Vox), David Pogue, and Nate Silver. He described Vox Media as "a technology company that produces media" rather than its inverse, associated with "Old Media". From his new position, Klein worked towards establishing Vox, including hiring new journalists for the site. Klein expected to "improve the technology of news" and build an online platform better equipped for making news understandable. The new site's 20-person staff was chosen for their expertise in topic areas and included Slate's Matthew Yglesias, Melissa Bell, and Klein's colleagues from The Washington Post. Vox was launched on April 6, 2014, with Klein serving as editor-in-chief.

Klein's opening editorial essay, "How politics makes us stupid", explained his distress about political polarization in the context of Yale Law School professor Dan Kahan's theories on how people protect themselves from information that conflicts with their core beliefs.

In June 2016, Vox suspended contributor Emmett Rensin for a series of tweets calling for anti-Trump riots, including one on June 3, 2016, that urged, "If Trump comes to your town, start a riot." The tweets drew attention after violent anti-Trump protests took place in San Jose, California, on the day of Rensin's tweet. Elizabeth Plank was hired in 2016 as a political correspondent, and in 2017, launched her own series with Vox Media, called Divided States of Women.

In September 2017, Klein announced that he was taking on a new role as editor-at-large, and that Lauren Williams, who joined Vox a few months after its founding, was the new editor-in-chief. In late 2020, Klein, Williams, and Yglesias left the site. While Vox had been founded with prominent journalists, Vox Media CEO Jim Bankoff said that their brands had mature, mainstream audiences that no longer relied on personalities.

Swati Sharma was named editor-in-chief in February 2021. A managing editor of The Atlantic at the time of her appointment, she was expected to assume the position in March 2021.

In November 2022, it was reported by Reason magazine that Sam Bankman-Fried—founder of bankrupt cryptocurrency exchange FTX—had issued major grants to a number of predominantly left-leaning political media outlets, including Vox.

In May 2026, James Murdoch, son of Rupert Murdoch, bought half of Vox media's assets, including the Vox website, for around $300m, placing under the company Lupa Systems.

== Content ==
According to Vox's founding editors, the site seeks to explain traditional news stories, characterized broadly as "excellent[ly] report[ed] and [having] add[ed] commentary atop", by providing additional contextual information. To reuse work from authors prior to the relaunch in 2014, Vox creates "card stacks" in bright canary yellow that provide context and define terms within an article. The cards are perpetually maintained as a form of "wiki page written by one person with a little attitude". As an example, a card about the term "insurance exchange" may be reused on stories about the Affordable Care Act.

Vox uses Vox Media's Chorus content management system, which enables journalists to easily create articles with complex visual effects and transitions, such as photos that change as the reader scrolls. Vox Media's properties target educated households with six-figure incomes and a head of house less than 35 years old.

In 2018, Vox launched Future Perfect, a reporting project that examines the world through philanthropy and effective altruism, initially funded by the Rockefeller Foundation.

=== Video ===
Vox has a YouTube channel by the same name where they have regularly posted videos on news and informational subjects since 2014. These videos are accompanied by an article on their website. The themes covered in the videos are usually similar to the themes covered in the regular, written articles on the website. The channel has over 12.5 million subscribers and over 3.6 billion views as of February 5, 2025. Content surrounds current affairs, timelines of certain events, and interesting facts.

In May 2018, Vox partnered with Netflix to release a weekly TV show called Explained.

=== Podcasts ===
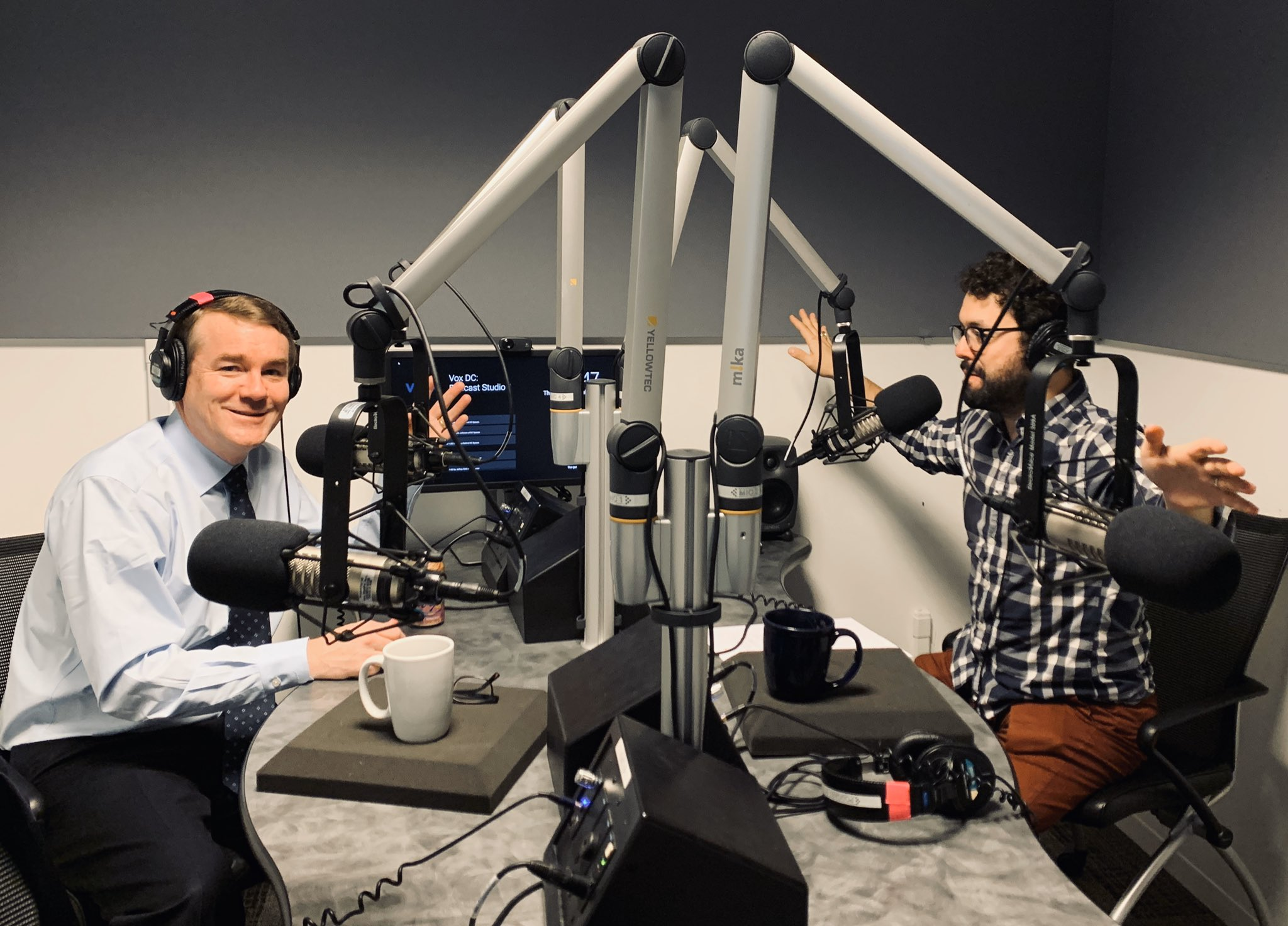
Zack Beauchamp interviewing Michael Bennet for the Worldly podcast in 2019

Vox distributes numerous podcasts, all hosted by Vox staff, as part of the Vox Media Podcast Network:

- The Weeds is a twice-weekly roundtable podcast, hosted by Yglesias and immigration correspondent Dara Lind, focusing on U.S. national news with a focus on the fine details of public policy. Senior politics reporter Jane Coaston was a regular co-host before joining the New York Times.
- The Gray Area with Sean Illing (formerly the "Vox Conversations" podcast) is a weekly interview podcast in which Sean Illing and other hosts across the Vox newsroom interview guests in politics, media, science, and culture.
- I Think You're Interesting is a weekly interview podcast about the arts, entertainment, and pop culture, hosted by Vox's "critic at large" Emily St. James.
- Worldly (2017–21) was a weekly roundtable podcast focusing on U.S. foreign policy and international affairs, hosted by Vox foreign-and-security-policy writers Jennifer Williams, Zack Beauchamp, and Alex Ward; Yochi Dreazen also previously hosted.
- The Impact is a weekly narrative podcast hosted by Kliff investigating the effects of policy decisions in practice.
- Today, Explained is a daily podcast, hosted by Sean Ramaswaram and Noel King, providing short explanations of items in the news.
- Future Perfect is a weekly podcast, hosted by Dylan Matthews, exploring provocative ideas with the potential to radically improve the world, often discussing ideas associated with effective altruism.
- Primetime is a short-run podcast hosted by Emily St. James. Season 1 (six episodes) focused on TV's relationship with the presidency and was released on a weekly schedule.
- Unexplainable is a weekly science podcast hosted by Noam Hassenfeld and a panel of experts exploring unanswered questions and the ways scientists are trying to answer them.
- Land of the Giants is a weekly podcast hosted by Shirin Ghaffary and Alex Kantrowitz where each season covers a tech giant like Google, Apple, Uber, Netflix, and Amazon Prime Video and their dominance in their respective technology sector.
- Vox Quick Hits was a daily podcast consisting of short episodes covering topics in news, politics, and pop culture. Vox Quick Hits ended on September 10, 2021.

== Reception ==
In March 2014, before it had officially launched, Vox was criticized by conservative media commentators, including Erick Erickson, for a video it had published arguing the U.S. public debt "isn't a problem right now".

The website's launch received significant media attention. Websites noted that the launch came around the same time as other data and explainer websites like FiveThirtyEight and The New York Times' The Upshot. Vox was described as trying to act as a "Wikipedia for ongoing news stories".

Pascal-Emmanuel Gobry at The Week argued that the website produced "partisan commentary in question-and-answer disguise" and criticized the site for having a "starting lineup [that] was mostly made up of ideological liberals". The Week's Ryu Spaeth described the site's operations as "...essentially tak[ing] the news (in other words, what is happening in the world at any given moment in time) and fram[ing] it in a way that appeals to its young, liberal audience." Damon Linker also criticized them, calling them "a parody of liberal faux-neutrality," and that "partisanship is so obvious," in an Obama interview they conducted, "that it's hard to imagine anyone being fooled."

The Economist, commenting on Klein's launching essay "How politics makes us stupid", said the website was "bright and promising" and site's premise of "more, better, and more lucidly presented information" was "profoundly honourable", and positively compared the site's mission to John Keats's negative capability. In an opinion piece in The Washington Times, Christopher J. Harper criticized the site for numerous reporting mistakes.

The co-founder of Vox, Matthew Yglesias, after leaving the company, stated in an interview for The Atlantic that he was at odds not just with those at Vox, but mainstream media as a whole, saying "'The people making the media are young college graduates in big cities, and that kind of politics makes a lot of sense to them,' he said. 'And we keep seeing that older people, and working-class people of all races and ethnicities, just don't share that entire worldview.'"

=== Accolades ===
In 2015, the Committee for Skeptical Inquiry presented Julia Belluz the Robert B. Balles Prize for Critical Thinking for her work on Vox.

Original programming by Vox has been recognized by the News & Documentary Emmy Awards, which are presented by the National Academy of Television Arts and Sciences. In 2017, the documentary 2016 Olympics: What Rio Doesn't Want the World to See was nominated in the "Outstanding News Special" category, Vox Pop was nominated in the "Outstanding Arts, Culture and Entertainment Report" and "Outstanding Graphic Design and Art Direction" categories, and The Secret Life of Muslims was nominated in the "Outstanding Short Documentary" category. In 2018, Borders was nominated in the "Outstanding Video Journalism: News" category, and Earworm received nominations in the "Outstanding Graphic Design and Art Direction" and "Outstanding New Approaches: Arts, Lifestyle and Culture" categories. Between 2017 and 2021, Vox journalists David Roberts, Umair Irfan, and Rebecca Leber won five SEAL Awards for environmental journalism.

== Readership ==
Vox received 8.2 million unique visitors in July 2014. In October 2021, readership was estimated to be 19.7 million visitors.

In a 2017 interview on Nieman Lab, Klein stated: "We watch our audience data pretty closely, and our audience data does not show or suggest to us that we are overwhelmingly read on one side or the other of the political sphere, which is good.
