= Swati Sharma (journalist) =

American journalist

Swati Sharma is an Indian American journalist and is the editor in chief of Vox. She was previously with The Atlantic, joining in January 2018 and being promoted to managing editor in March 2019. Before that, she was deputy general assignment editor at The Washington Post and also served as the digital editor of its international and national security departments.

She graduated from Northeastern University with a bachelor's degree in journalism and political science.
