= Forbes list of the most valuable sports teams =

The world's most valuable sports teams, as ranked annually by the American magazine Forbes, includes teams from Major League Baseball (MLB), the National Basketball Association (NBA), the National Football League (NFL), Formula One, and several European association football leagues.

== Current ranking ==
According to the latest ranking from December 18, 2025:

The Dallas Cowboys remain No. 1—as they have every year since 2016—but these days, America's Team is valued at a stratospheric $13 billion. Together, the 50 top teams are worth more than $353 billion, or an average of $7.1 billion each—up 22% from 2024 and more than double the mark from just four years ago.

With that disparity, soccer now accounts for only four of the world's 50 most valuable teams—two clubs from Spain's La Liga and two from England's Premier League—down from seven in each of the past two years, with England's Manchester City, Germany's Bayern Munich and France's Paris Saint-Germain dropping off the list.

MLB is also down to two representatives, after the Boston Red Sox fell out of the top 50, and the NHL, where the Toronto Maple Leafs reign at $4.4 billion, and MLS, where LAFC was No. 1 at $1.25 billion, are among the men's professional leagues that could not break into this year's ranking.

No league, however, compares to the NFL, which has 30 of its 32 teams among the top 50—everyone except the $5.3 billion New Orleans Saints and the $5.25 billion Cincinnati Bengals.

Formula 1 returned to the ranking with two representatives, Ferrari and Mercedes, both of which were unranked in 2024.

The Buffalo Bills, Detroit Lions and Miami Heat entered the top 50, replacing the New Orleans Saints, Dallas Mavericks, Manchester City, Bayern Munich and Paris Saint-Germain from the previous year's ranking.

2025 ranking
Rank	Team	Sport	League	Value (USD billion)
1	(United States) Dallas Cowboys	American football	NFL	$13
2	(United States) Golden State Warriors	Basketball	NBA	$11
3	(United States) Los Angeles Rams	American football	NFL	$10.5
4	(United States) New York Giants	American football	NFL	$10.1
5	(United States) Los Angeles Lakers	Basketball	NBA	$10
6	(United States) New York Knicks	Basketball	NBA	$9.75
7	(United States) New England Patriots	American football	NFL	$9
8	(United States) San Francisco 49ers	American football	NFL	$8.6
9	(United States) Philadelphia Eagles	American football	NFL	$8.3
10	(United States) Chicago Bears	American football	NFL	$8.2
10	(United States) New York Yankees	Baseball	MLB	$8.2
12	(United States) New York Jets	American football	NFL	$8.1
13	(United States) Las Vegas Raiders	American football	NFL	$7.7
14	(United States) Washington Commanders	American football	NFL	$7.6
15	(United States) Los Angeles Clippers	Basketball	NBA	$7.5
15	(United States) Miami Dolphins	American football	NFL	$7.5
17	(United States) Houston Texans	American football	NFL	$7.4
18	(United States) Denver Broncos	American football	NFL	$6.8
18	(United States) Los Angeles Dodgers	Baseball	MLB	$6.8
20	(Spain) Real Madrid	Association football	La Liga	$6.75
21	(United States) Boston Celtics	Basketball	NBA	$6.7
21	(United States) Seattle Seahawks	American football	NFL	$6.7
23	(United States) Green Bay Packers	American football	NFL	$6.65
24	(England) Manchester United	Association football	Premier League	$6.6
24	(United States) Tampa Bay Buccaneers	American football	NFL	$6.6
26	(Italy) Ferrari	Auto racing	Formula One	$6.5
26	(United States) Pittsburgh Steelers	American football	NFL	$6.5
28	(United States) Cleveland Browns	American football	NFL	$6.4
29	(United States) Atlanta Falcons	American football	NFL	$6.35
30	(United States) Tennessee Titans	American football	NFL	$6.3
31	(United States) Minnesota Vikings	American football	NFL	$6.25
32	(United States) Kansas City Chiefs	American football	NFL	$6.2
33	(United States) Baltimore Ravens	American football	NFL	$6.1
34	(United States) Chicago Bulls	Basketball	NBA	$6
34	(United States) Los Angeles Chargers	American football	NFL	$6
34	(Germany) Mercedes	Auto racing	Formula One	$6
37	(United States) Buffalo Bills	American football	NFL	$5.95
38	(United States) Houston Rockets	Basketball	NBA	$5.9
38	(United States) Indianapolis Colts	American football	NFL	$5.9
40	(United States) Carolina Panthers	American football	NFL	$5.7
40	(United States) Miami Heat	Basketball	NBA	$5.7
42	(Spain) FC Barcelona	Association football	La Liga	$5.65
43	(United States) Jacksonville Jaguars	American football	NFL	$5.6
43	(United States) Brooklyn Nets	Basketball	NBA	$5.6
45	(United States) Arizona Cardinals	American football	NFL	$5.5
46	(United States) Philadelphia 76ers	Basketball	NBA	$5.45
47	(United States) Phoenix Suns	Basketball	NBA	$5.425
48	(United States) Detroit Lions	American football	NFL	$5.4
48	(England) Liverpool	Association football	Premier League	$5.4
48	(Canada) Toronto Raptors	Basketball	NBA	$5.4

== Number one by year ==
In 2016, the NFL's Dallas Cowboys simultaneously became both the first team to surpass $4 billion in value and the first non–association football team to top the ranking since its inception in 2010. Manchester United (2010–12) and Real Madrid (2013–15) have previously each been named the most valuable team three times. The Cowboys have remained the most valuable team every year since 2016, reaching a record valuation of $13 billion in 2025.

Year	Team	Sport	League	Value (USD billion)
2025	(United States) Dallas Cowboys	American football	NFL	$13.0
2024	(United States) Dallas Cowboys	American football	NFL	$10.1
2023	(United States) Dallas Cowboys	American football	NFL	$9.0
2022	(United States) Dallas Cowboys	American football	NFL	$8.0
2021	(United States) Dallas Cowboys	American football	NFL	$5.7
2020	(United States) Dallas Cowboys	American football	NFL	$5.5
2019	(United States) Dallas Cowboys	American football	NFL	$5.0
2018	(United States) Dallas Cowboys	American football	NFL	$4.8
2017	(United States) Dallas Cowboys	American football	NFL	$4.2
2016	(United States) Dallas Cowboys	American football	NFL	$4.0
2015	(Spain) Real Madrid	Association football	La Liga	$3.26
2014	(Spain) Real Madrid	Association football	La Liga	$3.44
2013	(Spain) Real Madrid	Association football	La Liga	$3.30
2012	(England) Manchester United	Association football	Premier League	$2.23
2011	(England) Manchester United	Association football	Premier League	$1.86
2010	(England) Manchester United	Association football	Premier League	$1.83

== Previous rankings ==
=== 2024 ===
Rank	Team	Sport	League	Value (USD billion)
1	(United States) Dallas Cowboys	American football	NFL	$10.1
2	(United States) New England Patriots	American football	NFL	$9
3	(United States) Golden State Warriors	Basketball	NBA	$8.8
4	(United States) Los Angeles Rams	American football	NFL	$7.6
5	(United States) New York Yankees	Baseball	MLB	$7.55
6	(United States) New York Knicks	Basketball	NBA	$7.5
7	(United States) New York Giants	American football	NFL	$7.3
8	(United States) Los Angeles Lakers	Basketball	NBA	$7.1
9	(United States) New York Jets	American football	NFL	$6.9
10	(United States) San Francisco 49ers	American football	NFL	$6.8
11	(United States) Las Vegas Raiders	American football	NFL	$6.7
12	(United States) Philadelphia Eagles	American football	NFL	$6.6
12	(Spain) Real Madrid	Association football	La Liga	$6.6
14	(England) Manchester United	Association football	Premier League	$6.55
15	(United States) Chicago Bears	American football	NFL	$6.4
16	(United States) Washington Commanders	American football	NFL	$6.3
17	(United States) Miami Dolphins	American football	NFL	$6.2
18	(United States) Houston Texans	American football	NFL	$6.1
19	(United States) Boston Celtics	Basketball	NBA	$6
20	(Spain) Barcelona	Association football	La Liga	$5.6
20	(United States) Green Bay Packers	American football	NFL	$5.6
22	(United States) Denver Broncos	American football	NFL	$5.5
22	(United States) Los Angeles Clippers	Basketball	NBA	$5.5
24	(United States) Los Angeles Dodgers	Baseball	MLB	$5.45
24	(United States) Seattle Seahawks	American football	NFL	$5.45
26	(United States) Tampa Bay Buccaneers	American football	NFL	$5.4
27	(England) Liverpool FC	Association football	Premier League	$5.37
28	(United States) Pittsburgh Steelers	American football	NFL	$5.3
29	(United States) Atlanta Falcons	American football	NFL	$5.2
30	(United States) Cleveland Browns	American football	NFL	$5.15
31	(United States) Los Angeles Chargers	American football	NFL	$5.1
31	(England) Manchester City	Association football	Premier League	$5.1
33	(United States) Minnesota Vikings	American football	NFL	$5.05
34	(United States) Baltimore Ravens	American football	NFL	$5
34	(Germany) Bayern Munich	Association football	Bundesliga	$5
34	(United States) Chicago Bulls	Basketball	NBA	$5
37	(United States) Houston Rockets	Basketball	NBA	$4.9
37	(United States) Tennessee Titans	American football	NFL	$4.9
39	(United States) Kansas City Chiefs	American football	NFL	$4.85
40	(United States) Brooklyn Nets	Basketball	NBA	$4.8
40	(United States) Indianapolis Colts	American football	NFL	$4.8
42	(United States) Dallas Mavericks	Basketball	NBA	$4.7
43	(United States) Jacksonville Jaguars	American football	NFL	$4.6
43	(United States) Philadelphia 76ers	Basketball	NBA	$4.6
45	(United States) Boston Red Sox	Baseball	MLB	$4.5
45	(United States) Carolina Panthers	American football	NFL	$4.5
47	(United States) New Orleans Saints	American football	NFL	$4.4
47	(France) Paris Saint-Germain	Association football	Ligue 1	$4.4
47	(Canada) Toronto Raptors	Basketball	NBA	$4.4
50	(United States) Arizona Cardinals	American football	NFL	$4.3
50	(United States) Phoenix Suns	Basketball	NBA	$4.3

=== 2023 ===
Rank	Team	Sport	League	Value (USD billion)
1	(United States) Dallas Cowboys	American football	NFL	$9
2	(United States) New York Yankees	Baseball	MLB	$7.1
3	(United States) Golden State Warriors	Basketball	NBA	$7
3	(United States) New England Patriots	American football	NFL	$7
5	(United States) Los Angeles Rams	American football	NFL	$6.9
6	(United States) New York Giants	American football	NFL	$6.8
7	(United States) Chicago Bears	American football	NFL	$6.3
8	(United States) Las Vegas Raiders	American football	NFL	$6.2
9	(United States) New York Knicks	Basketball	NBA	$6.1
9	(United States) New York Jets	American football	NFL	$6.1
11	(Spain) Real Madrid	Association football	La Liga	$6.07
12	(United States) Washington Commanders	American football	NFL	$6.05
13	(England) Manchester United	Association football	Premier League	$6
13	(United States) San Francisco 49ers	American football	NFL	$6
15	(United States) Los Angeles Lakers	Basketball	NBA	$5.9
16	(United States) Philadelphia Eagles	American football	NFL	$5.8
17	(United States) Miami Dolphins	American football	NFL	$5.7
18	(Spain) Barcelona	Association football	La Liga	$5.508
19	(United States) Houston Texans	American football	NFL	$5.5
20	(England) Liverpool	Association football	Premier League	$5.288
21	(United States) Denver Broncos	American football	NFL	$5.1
22	(United States) Seattle Seahawks	American football	NFL	$5
23	(England) Manchester City	Association football	Premier League	$4.99
24	(Germany) Bayern Munich	Association football	Bundesliga	$4.86
25	(United States) Los Angeles Dodgers	Baseball	MLB	$4.8
26	(United States) Atlanta Falcons	American football	NFL	$4.7
27	(United States) Minnesota Vikings	American football	NFL	$4.65
28	(United States) Baltimore Ravens	American football	NFL	$4.63
29	(United States) Pittsburgh Steelers	American football	NFL	$4.625
30	(United States) Cleveland Browns	American football	NFL	$4.62
31	(United States) Green Bay Packers	American football	NFL	$4.6
32	(United States) Boston Red Sox	Baseball	MLB	$4.5
33	(United States) Tennessee Titans	American football	NFL	$4.4
34	(United States) Indianapolis Colts	American football	NFL	$4.35
35	(United States) Kansas City Chiefs	American football	NFL	$4.3
36	(France) Paris Saint-Germain	Association football	Ligue 1	$4.21
37	(United States) Tampa Bay Buccaneers	American football	NFL	$4.2
38	(United States) Los Angeles Chargers	American football	NFL	$4.15
39	(United States) Chicago Cubs	Baseball	MLB	$4.1
39	(United States) Chicago Bulls	Basketball	NBA	$4.1
39	(United States) Carolina Panthers	American football	NFL	$4.1
42	(United States) New Orleans Saints	American football	NFL	$4.075
43	(United States) Boston Celtics	Basketball	NBA	$4
43	(United States) Jacksonville Jaguars	American football	NFL	$4
45	(Italy) Ferrari	Auto racing	Formula One	$3.9
45	(United States) Los Angeles Clippers	Basketball	NBA	$3.9
47	(Germany) Mercedes	Auto racing	Formula One	$3.8
47	(United States) Arizona Cardinals	American football	NFL	$3.8
49	(United States) San Francisco Giants	Baseball	MLB	$3.7
49	(United States) Buffalo Bills	American football	NFL	$3.7

=== 2022 ===
Rank	Team	Sport	League	Value (USD billion)
1	(United States) Dallas Cowboys	American football	NFL	$8.12
2	(United States) New England Patriots	American football	NFL	$6.40
3	(United States) Los Angeles Rams	American football	NFL	$6.20
4	(United States) New York Yankees	Baseball	MLB	$6.00
4	(United States) New York Giants	American football	NFL	$6.00
6	(United States) New York Knicks	Basketball	NBA	$5.80
6	(United States) Chicago Bears	American football	NFL	$5.80
8	(United States) Golden State Warriors	Basketball	NBA	$5.60
8	(United States) Washington Commanders	American football	NFL	$6.05
10	(United States) Los Angeles Lakers	Basketball	NBA	$5.50
11	(United States) New York Jets	American football	NFL	$5.40
12	(United States) San Francisco 49ers	American football	NFL	$5.20
13	(Spain) Real Madrid CF	Association football	La Liga	$5.10
13	(United States) Las Vegas Raiders	American football	NFL	$5.10
15	(Spain) FC Barcelona	Association football	La Liga	$5.00
16	(United States) Philadelphia Eagles	American football	NFL	$4.90
17	(United States) Houston Texans	American football	NFL	$4.70
18	(United States) Denver Broncos	American football	NFL	$4.65
19	(England) Manchester United	Association football	Premier League	$4.60
19	(United States) Miami Dolphins	American football	NFL	$4.60
21	(United States) Seattle Seahawks	American football	NFL	$4.50
22	(England) Liverpool	Association football	Premier League	$4.45
23	(Germany) Bayern Munich	Association football	Bundesliga	$4.28
24	(England) Manchester City	Association football	Premier League	$4.25
24	(United States) Green Bay Packers	American football	NFL	$4.25
26	(United States) Los Angeles Dodgers	Baseball	MLB	$4.08
27	(United States) Atlanta Falcons	American football	NFL	$4.00
28	(United States) Pittsburgh Steelers	American football	NFL	$3.98
29	(United States) Minnesota Vikings	American football	NFL	$3.93
30	(United States) Boston Red Sox	Baseball	MLB	$3.90
30	(United States) Baltimore Ravens	American football	NFL	$3.90
32	(United States) Los Angeles Chargers	American football	NFL	$3.88
33	(United States) Cleveland Browns	American football	NFL	$3.85
34	(United States) Chicago Cubs	Baseball	MLB	$3.80
34	(United States) Indianapolis Colts	American football	NFL	$3.80
36	(United States) Kansas City Chiefs	American football	NFL	$3.70
37	(United States) Tampa Bay Buccaneers	American football	NFL	$3.68
38	(United States) Chicago Bulls	Basketball	NBA	$3.65
39	(United States) Carolina Panthers	American football	NFL	$3.60
40	(United States) New Orleans Saints	American football	NFL	$3.58
41	(United States) Boston Celtics	Basketball	NBA	$3.55
42	(United States) San Francisco Giants	Baseball	MLB	$3.50
42	(United States) Tennessee Titans	American football	NFL	$3.50
44	(United States) Jacksonville Jaguars	American football	NFL	$3.48
45	(United States) Buffalo Bills	American football	NFL	$3.40
46	(United States) Los Angeles Clippers	Basketball	NBA	$3.30
47	(United States) Arizona Cardinals	American football	NFL	$3.27
48	(United States) Brooklyn Nets	Basketball	NBA	$3.20
48	(France) Paris Saint-Germain	Association football	Ligue 1	$3.20
50	(England) Chelsea	Association football	Premier League	$3.10

=== 2021 ===
Rank	Team	Sport	League	Value (USD billion)
1	(United States) Dallas Cowboys	American football	NFL	$5.7
2	(United States) New York Yankees	Baseball	MLB	$5.25
3	(United States) New York Knicks	Basketball	NBA	$5
4	(Spain) Barcelona	Association football	La Liga	$4.76
5	(Spain) Real Madrid	Association football	La Liga	$4.75
6	(United States) Golden State Warriors	Basketball	NBA	$4.7
7	(United States) Los Angeles Lakers	Basketball	NBA	$4.6
8	(United States) New England Patriots	American football	NFL	$4.4
9	(United States) New York Giants	American football	NFL	$4.3
10	(Germany) Bayern Munich	Association football	Bundesliga	$4.21
11	(England) Manchester United	Association football	Premier League	$4.2
12	(England) Liverpool	Association football	Premier League	$4.1
13	(United States) Los Angeles Rams	American football	NFL	$4
13	(England) Manchester City	Association football	Premier League	$4
15	(United States) San Francisco 49ers	American football	NFL	$3.8
16	(United States) Los Angeles Dodgers	Baseball	MLB	$3.57
17	(United States) New York Jets	American football	NFL	$3.55
18	(United States) Chicago Bears	American football	NFL	$3.53
19	(United States) Washington Football Team	American football	NFL	$3.5
20	(United States) Boston Red Sox	Baseball	MLB	$3.47
21	(United States) Philadelphia Eagles	American football	NFL	$3.4
22	(United States) Chicago Cubs	Baseball	MLB	$3.36
23	(United States) Chicago Bulls	Basketball	NBA	$3.3
23	(United States) Houston Texans	American football	NFL	$3.3
25	(United States) Boston Celtics	Basketball	NBA	$3.2
25	(England) Chelsea	Association football	Premier League	$3.2
25	(United States) Denver Broncos	American football	NFL	$3.2
28	(United States) San Francisco Giants	Baseball	MLB	$3.18
29	(United States) Las Vegas Raiders	American football	NFL	$3.1
30	(United States) Seattle Seahawks	American football	NFL	$3.08
31	(United States) Green Bay Packers	American football	NFL	$3.05
32	(United States) Pittsburgh Steelers	American football	NFL	$3
33	(United States) Baltimore Ravens	American football	NFL	$2.98
34	(United States) Minnesota Vikings	American football	NFL	$2.95
35	(United States) Miami Dolphins	American football	NFL	$2.9
36	(United States) Atlanta Falcons	American football	NFL	$2.88
37	(United States) Indianapolis Colts	American football	NFL	$2.85
38	(England) Arsenal	Association football	Premier League	$2.8
39	(United States) Los Angeles Clippers	Basketball	NBA	$2.75
40	(United States) Brooklyn Nets	Basketball	NBA	$2.65
41	(United States) Los Angeles Chargers	American football	NFL	$2.6
42	(United States) Carolina Panthers	American football	NFL	$2.55
43	(United States) Houston Rockets	Basketball	NBA	$2.5
43	(United States) Kansas City Chiefs	American football	NFL	$2.5
43	(France) Paris Saint-Germain	Association football	Ligue 1	$2.5
46	(United States) New Orleans Saints	American football	NFL	$2.48
47	(United States) Dallas Mavericks	Basketball	NBA	$2.45
47	(United States) Jacksonville Jaguars	American football	NFL	$2.45
47	(United States) New York Mets	Baseball	MLB	$2.45
50	(United States) Cleveland Browns	American football	NFL	$2.35

=== 2020 ===
Rank	Team	Sport	League	Value (USD billion)	Growth (2019–20)
1	(United States) Dallas Cowboys	American football	NFL	$5.500	▲10%
2	(United States) New York Yankees	Baseball	MLB	$5.000	▲9%
3	(United States) New York Knicks	Basketball	NBA	$4.600	▲15%
4	(United States) Los Angeles Lakers	Basketball	NBA	$4.400	▲19%
5	(United States) Golden State Warriors	Basketball	NBA	$4.300	▲23%
6	(Spain) Real Madrid	Association football	La Liga	$4.240	0%
7	(United States) New England Patriots	American football	NFL	$4.100	▲8%
8	(Spain) FC Barcelona	Association football	La Liga	$4.020	0%
9	(United States) New York Giants	American football	NFL	$3.900	▲18%
10	(England) Manchester United	Association football	Premier League	$3.810	0%
11	(United States) Los Angeles Rams	American football	NFL	$3.800	▲19%
12	(United States) San Francisco 49ers	American football	NFL	$3.500	▲15%
13	(United States) Chicago Bears	American football	NFL	$3.450	▲19%
14	(United States) Los Angeles Dodgers	Baseball	MLB	$3.400	▲3%
14	(United States) Washington Football Team	American football	NFL	$3.400	▲10%
16	(United States) Boston Red Sox	Baseball	MLB	$3.300	▲3%
17	(United States) Chicago Bulls	Basketball	NBA	$3.200	▲10%
17	(United States) Chicago Cubs	Baseball	MLB	$3.200	▲3%
17	(United States) New York Jets	American football	NFL	$3.200	▲12%
20	(United States) Boston Celtics	Basketball	NBA	$3.100	▲11%
20	(United States) Houston Texans	American football	NFL	$3.100	11%
20	(United States) San Francisco Giants	Baseball	MLB	$3.100	▲3%
23	(United States) Philadelphia Eagles	American football	NFL	$3.050	▲11%
24	(Germany) Bayern Munich	Association football	Bundesliga	$3.020	0%
25	(United States) Denver Broncos	American football	NFL	$3.000	▲13%
26	(United States) Las Vegas Raiders	American football	NFL	$2.900	▲20%
27	(United States) Green Bay Packers	American football	NFL	$2.850	▲8%
28	(United States) Pittsburgh Steelers	American football	NFL	$2.800	▲8%
29	(United States) Seattle Seahawks	American football	NFL	$2.780	▲8%
30	(United States) Miami Dolphins	American football	NFL	$2.760	▲7%
31	(United States) Atlanta Falcons	American football	NFL	$2.755	▲6%
32	(United States) Baltimore Ravens	American football	NFL	$2.750	▲6%
33	(United States) Minnesota Vikings	American football	NFL	$2.700	13%
34	(England) Manchester City	Association football	Premier League	$2.690	0%
35	(United States) Indianapolis Colts	American football	NFL	$2.650	▲11%
36	(United States) Los Angeles Clippers	Basketball	NBA	$2.600	▲18%
37	(England) Chelsea	Association football	Premier League	$2.580	0%
38	(United States) Brooklyn Nets	Basketball	NBA	$2.500	▲6%
38	(United States) Los Angeles Chargers	American football	NFL	$2.500	▲10%
40	(United States) Houston Rockets	Basketball	NBA	$2.480	▲8%
41	(United States) Carolina Panthers	American football	NFL	$2.400	▲4%
41	(United States) Dallas Mavericks	Basketball	NBA	$2.400	▲8%
41	(United States) New York Mets	Baseball	MLB	$2.400	▲4%
44	(United States) Jacksonville Jaguars	American football	NFL	$2.330	▲12%
45	(United States) Kansas City Chiefs	American football	NFL	$2.300	▲10%
46	(United States) New Orleans Saints	American football	NFL	$2.280	▲10%
47	(England) Arsenal	Association football	Premier League	$2.270	0%
48	(United States) Arizona Cardinals	American football	NFL	$2.250	▲5%
49	(United States) St. Louis Cardinals	Baseball	MLB	$2.200	▲5%
49	(United States) Tampa Bay Buccaneers	American football	NFL	$2.200	

=== 2019 ===
Rank	Team	Sport	League	Value (USD billion)	Growth (2018–19)
1	(United States) Dallas Cowboys	American football	NFL	$5.000	▲4%
2	(United States) New York Yankees	Baseball	MLB	$4.600	▲15%
3	(Spain) Real Madrid	Association football	La Liga	$4.240	▲4%
4	(Spain) FC Barcelona	Association football	La Liga	$4.020	▼ −1%
5	(United States) New York Knicks	Basketball	NBA	$4.000	▲11%
6	(England) Manchester United	Association football	Premier League	$3.810	▼ −8%
7	(United States) New England Patriots	American football	NFL	$3.800	▲3%
8	(United States) Los Angeles Lakers	Basketball	NBA	$3.700	▲12%
9	(United States) Golden State Warriors	Basketball	NBA	$3.500	▲13%
10	(United States) New York Giants	American football	NFL	$3.300	0%
10	(United States) Los Angeles Dodgers	Baseball	MLB	$3.300	▲10%
12	(United States) Boston Red Sox	Baseball	MLB	$3.200	▲14%
12	(United States) Los Angeles Rams	American football	NFL	$3.200	▲7%
14	(United States) Washington Redskins	American football	NFL	$3.100	0%
14	(United States) Chicago Cubs	Baseball	MLB	$3.100	▲7%
16	(United States) San Francisco 49ers	American football	NFL	$3.050	0%
17	(Germany) Bayern Munich	Association football	Bundesliga	$3.020	▼ −1%
18	(United States) San Francisco Giants	Baseball	MLB	$3.000	▲5%
19	(United States) Chicago Bears	American football	NFL	$2.900	▲2%
19	(United States) Chicago Bulls	Basketball	NBA	$2.900	▲12%
21	(United States) New York Jets	American football	NFL	$2.850	▲4%
22	(United States) Houston Texans	American football	NFL	$2.800	0%
22	(United States) Boston Celtics	Basketball	NBA	$2.800	▲12%
24	(United States) Philadelphia Eagles	American football	NFL	$2.750	▲4%
25	(England) Manchester City	Association football	Premier League	$2.690	▲9%
26	(United States) Denver Broncos	American football	NFL	$2.650	▲2%
27	(United States) Green Bay Packers	American football	NFL	$2.630	▲3%
28	(United States) Atlanta Falcons	American football	NFL	$2.600	▲5%
29	(United States) Baltimore Ravens	American football	NFL	$2.590	▲4%
30	(United States) Pittsburgh Steelers	American football	NFL	$2.585	▲5%
31	(United States) Seattle Seahawks	American football	NFL	$2.580	▲6%
32	(England) Chelsea	Association football	Premier League	$2.580	▲25%
33	(United States) Miami Dolphins	American football	NFL	$2.580	0%
34	(United States) Oakland Raiders	American football	NFL	$2.420	▲2%
35	(United States) Minnesota Vikings	American football	NFL	$2.400	0%
36	(United States) Indianapolis Colts	American football	NFL	$2.380	0%
37	(United States) Brooklyn Nets	Basketball	NBA	$2.350	▲2%
38	(United States) Houston Rockets	Basketball	NBA	$2.300	▲5%
38	(United States) Carolina Panthers	American football	NFL	$2.300	0%
38	(United States) New York Mets	Baseball	MLB	$2.300	▲10%
41	(United States) Los Angeles Chargers	American football	NFL	$2.280	0%
42	(England) Arsenal	Association football	Premier League	$2.270	▲1%
43	(United States) Dallas Mavericks	Basketball	NBA	$2.225	▲18%
44	(United States) Los Angeles Clippers	Basketball	NBA	$2.200	▲2%
45	(England) Liverpool	Association football	Premier League	$2.180	▲12%
46	(United States) Arizona Cardinals	American football	NFL	$2.150	0%
47	(United States) Kansas City Chiefs	American football	NFL	$2.100	0%
47	(United States) St. Louis Cardinals	Baseball	MLB	$2.100	▲11%
49	(United States) Jacksonville Jaguars	American football	NFL	$2.080	0%
50	(United States) New Orleans Saints	American football	NFL	$2.080	▲4%

=== 2018 ===
Rank	Team	Sport	League	Value (USD billion)	Growth (2017–18)
1	(United States) Dallas Cowboys	American football	NFL	$4.800	▲14%
2	(England) Manchester United	Association football	Premier League	$4.123	▲12%
3	(Spain) Real Madrid	Association football	La Liga	$4.088	▲14%
4	(Spain) FC Barcelona	Association football	La Liga	$4.064	▲12%
5	(United States) New York Yankees	Baseball	MLB	$4.000	▲08%
6	(United States) New England Patriots	American football	NFL	$3.700	▲09%
7	(United States) New York Knicks	Basketball	NBA	$3.600	▲09%
8	(United States) Los Angeles Lakers	Basketball	NBA	$3.300	▲10%
8	(United States) New York Giants	American football	NFL	$3.300	▲06%
10	(United States) Golden State Warriors	Basketball	NBA	$3.100	▲19%
10	(United States) Washington Redskins	American football	NFL	$3.100	▲05%
12	(Germany) Bayern Munich	Association football	Bundesliga	$3.063	▲13%
13	(United States) San Francisco 49ers	American football	NFL	$3.050	▲02%
14	(United States) Los Angeles Dodgers	Baseball	MLB	$3.000	▲09%
14	(United States) Los Angeles Rams	American football	NFL	$3.000	▲03%
16	(United States) Chicago Cubs	Baseball	MLB	$2.900	▲08%
17	(United States) San Francisco Giants	Baseball	MLB	$2.850	▲08%
17	(United States) Chicago Bears	American football	NFL	$2.850	▲06%
19	(United States) Boston Red Sox	Baseball	MLB	$2.800	▲04%
19	(United States) Houston Texans	American football	NFL	$2.800	▲08%
21	(United States) New York Jets	American football	NFL	$2.750	0%
22	(United States) Philadelphia Eagles	American football	NFL	$2.650	▲06%
23	(United States) Chicago Bulls	Basketball	NBA	$2.600	▲04%
23	(United States) Denver Broncos	American football	NFL	$2.600	▲08%
25	(United States) Miami Dolphins	American football	NFL	$2.575	▲08%
26	(United States) Green Bay Packers	American football	NFL	$2.550	▲09%
27	(United States) Boston Celtics	Basketball	NBA	$2.500	▲14%
27	(United States) Baltimore Ravens	American football	NFL	$2.500	▲09%
29	(United States) Atlanta Falcons	American football	NFL	$2.475	▲16%
30	(England) Manchester City	Association football	Premier League	$2.474	▲19%
31	(United States) Pittsburgh Steelers	American football	NFL	$2.450	▲09%
32	(United States) Seattle Seahawks	American football	NFL	$2.425	▲09%
33	(United States) Minnesota Vikings	American football	NFL	$2.400	▲09%
34	(United States) Oakland Raiders	American football	NFL	$2.380	▲13%
35	(United States) Indianapolis Colts	American football	NFL	$2.375	▲09%
36	(United States) Brooklyn Nets	Basketball	NBA	$2.300	▲28%
36	(United States) Carolina Panthers	American football	NFL	$2.300	▲11%
38	(United States) Los Angeles Chargers	American football	NFL	$2.275	▲09%
39	(England) Arsenal	Association football	Premier League	$2.238	▲16%
40	(United States) Houston Rockets	Basketball	NBA	$2.200	▲33%
41	(United States) Los Angeles Clippers	Basketball	NBA	$2.150	▲07%
41	(United States) Arizona Cardinals	American football	NFL	$2.150	▲06%
43	(United States) New York Mets	Baseball	MLB	$2.100	▲05%
43	(United States) Kansas City Chiefs	American football	NFL	$2.100	▲12%
45	(United States) Jacksonville Jaguars	American football	NFL	$2.075	▲06%
46	(England) Chelsea	Association football	Premier League	$2.062	▲12%
47	(United States) Tennessee Titans	American football	NFL	$2.050	▲02%
48	(United States) New Orleans Saints	American football	NFL	$2.000	▲14%
49	(United States) Tampa Bay Buccaneers	American football	NFL	$1.975	▲10%
50	(United States) Cleveland Browns	American football	NFL	$1.950	▲05%

=== 2017 ===
Rank	Team	Sport	League	Value (USD billion)	Growth (2016–17)
1	(United States) Dallas Cowboys	American football	NFL	$4.20 billion	▲5%
2	(United States) New York Yankees	Baseball	MLB	$3.70	▲9%
3	(England) Manchester United	Association football	Premier League	$3.69	▲11%
4	(Spain) FC Barcelona	Association football	La Liga	$3.64	▲2%
5	(Spain) Real Madrid	Association football	La Liga	$3.58	▼ -2%
6	(United States) New England Patriots	American football	NFL	$3.40	▲6%
7	(United States) New York Knicks	Basketball	NBA	$3.30	▲10%
8	(United States) New York Giants	American football	NFL	$3.10	▲11%
9	(United States) Los Angeles Lakers	Basketball	NBA	$3.00	▲11%
9	(United States) San Francisco 49ers	American football	NFL	$3.00	▲11%
11	(United States) Washington Redskins	American football	NFL	$2.95	▲4%
12	(United States) Los Angeles Rams	American football	NFL	$2.90	N/A
13	(United States) Los Angeles Dodgers	Baseball	MLB	$2.75	▲6%
13	(United States) New York Jets	American football	NFL	$2.75	▲10%
15	(Germany) Bayern Munich	Association football	Bundesliga	$2.71	▲1%
16	(United States) Boston Red Sox	Baseball	MLB	$2.70	▲10%
16	(United States) Chicago Bears	American football	NFL	$2.70	▲17%
18	(United States) Chicago Cubs	Baseball	MLB	$2.68	▲22%
19	(United States) San Francisco Giants	Baseball	MLB	$2.65	▲18%
20	(United States) Golden State Warriors	Basketball	NBA	$2.60	▲4%
20	(United States) Houston Texans	American football	NFL	$2.60	▲37%
22	(United States) Chicago Bulls	Basketball	NBA	$2.50	▲4%
22	(United States) Philadelphia Eagles	American football	NFL	$2.50	▲9%
24	(United States) Denver Broncos	American football	NFL	$2.40	▲24%
25	(United States) Miami Dolphins	American football	NFL	$2.38	▲28%
26	(United States) Green Bay Packers	American football	NFL	$2.35	▲21%
27	(United States) Baltimore Ravens	American football	NFL	$2.30	▲19%
28	(United States) Pittsburgh Steelers	American football	NFL	$2.25	▲18%
28	(United States) Seattle Seahawks	American football	NFL	$2.25	▲19%
30	(United States) Boston Celtics	Basketball	NBA	$2.20	▲38%
30	(United States) Minnesota Vikings	American football	NFL	$2.20	▲5%
32	(United States) Indianapolis Colts	American football	NFL	$2.18	▲16%
33	(United States) Atlanta Falcons	American football	NFL	$2.13	▲27%
34	(United States) Oakland Raiders	American football	NFL	$2.10	▲47%
35	(England) Manchester City	Association football	Premier League	$2.083	▲8%
36	(United States) Los Angeles Chargers	American football	NFL	$2.08	▲36%
37	(United States) Carolina Panthers	American football	NFL	$2.075	▲33%
38	(United States) Arizona Cardinals	American football	NFL	$2.025	▲31%
39	(United States) Los Angeles Clippers	Basketball	NBA	$2.00	▲34%
39	(United States) New York Mets	Baseball	MLB	$2.00	0%
41	(United States) Tennessee Titans	American football	NFL	$2.00	▲21%
42	(United States) Jacksonville Jaguars	American football	NFL	$1.95	▲32%
43	(England) Arsenal	Association football	Premier League	$1.93	▼ -4%
44	(United States) Kansas City Chiefs	American football	NFL	$1.88	▲23%
45	(United States) Cleveland Browns	American football	NFL	$1.85	▲23%
46	(England) Chelsea	Association football	Premier League	$1.85	▲11%
47	(United States) Brooklyn Nets	Basketball	NBA	$1.80	▲19%
47	(United States) St. Louis Cardinals	Baseball	MLB	$1.80	▲6%
47	(United States) Tampa Bay Buccaneers	American football	NFL	$1.80	▲12%
50	(United States) Los Angeles Angels	Baseball	MLB	$1.75	▲16%
50	(United States) New Orleans Saints	American football	NFL	$1.75	▲31%

=== 2016 ===
Rank	Team	Sport	League	Value (USD billion)
1	(United States) Dallas Cowboys	American football	NFL	4.00
2	(Spain) Real Madrid	Association football	La Liga	3.65
3	(Spain) FC Barcelona	Association football	La Liga	3.55
4	(United States) New York Yankees	Baseball	MLB	3.40
5	(England) Manchester United	Association football	Premier League	3.32
6	(United States) New England Patriots	American football	NFL	3.20
7	(United States) New York Knicks	Basketball	NBA	3.00
8	(United States) Washington Redskins	American football	NFL	2.85
9	(United States) New York Giants	American football	NFL	2.80
10	(United States) Los Angeles Lakers	Basketball	NBA	2.70
10	(United States) San Francisco 49ers	American football	NFL	2.70

=== 2015 ===
Rank	Team	Sport	Country	Value (USD billion)
1	Real Madrid	Association football	Spain	3.26
2	Dallas Cowboys	American football	United States	3.2
2	New York Yankees	Baseball	United States	3.2
4	FC Barcelona	Association football	Spain	3.16
5	Manchester United	Association football	England	3.1
6	Los Angeles Lakers	Basketball	United States	2.6
6	New England Patriots	American football	United States	2.6
8	New York Knicks	Basketball	United States	2.5
9	Los Angeles Dodgers	Baseball	United States	2.4
9	Washington Redskins	American football	United States	2.4

=== 2014 ===
Rank	Team	Sport	Country	Value (USD billion)
1	Real Madrid	Association football	Spain	3.44
2	FC Barcelona	Association football	Spain	3.2
3	Manchester United	Association football	England	2.81
4	New York Yankees	Baseball	United States	2.5
5	Dallas Cowboys	American football	United States	2.3
6	Los Angeles Dodgers	Baseball	United States	2
7	Bayern Munich	Association football	Germany	1.85
8	New England Patriots	American football	United States	1.8
9	Washington Redskins	American football	United States	1.7
10	New York Giants	American football	United States	1.55

=== 2013 ===
Rank	Team	Sport	Country	Value (USD billion)
1	Real Madrid	Association football	Spain	$3.3
2	Manchester United	Association football	England	$3.165
3	FC Barcelona	Association football	Spain	$2.6
4	New York Yankees	Baseball	United States	$2.3
5	Dallas Cowboys	American football	United States	$2.1
6	New England Patriots	American football	United States	$1.635
7	Los Angeles Dodgers	Baseball	United States	$1.615
8	Washington Redskins	American football	United States	$1.6
9	New York Giants	American football	United States	$1.468
10	Arsenal	Association football	England	$1.326

=== 2012 ===
Rank	Team	Sport	Country	Value (USD billion)
1	Manchester United	Association football	England	$2.23
2	Real Madrid	Association football	Spain	$1.88
3	New York Yankees	Baseball	United States	$1.85
3	Dallas Cowboys	American football	United States	$1.85
5	Washington Redskins	American football	United States	$1.56
6	Los Angeles Dodgers	Baseball	United States	$1.4
6	New England Patriots	American football	United States	$1.4
8	FC Barcelona	Association football	Spain	$1.31
9	New York Giants	American football	United States	$1.3
10	Arsenal	Association football	England	$1.29

=== 2011 ===
Rank	Team	Sport	Country	Value (USD billion)
1	Manchester United	Association football	England	$1.86
2	Dallas Cowboys	American football	United States	$1.81
3	New York Yankees	Baseball	United States	$1.7
4	Washington Redskins	American football	United States	$1.55
5	Real Madrid	Association football	Spain	$1.45
6	New England Patriots	American football	United States	$1.37
7	Arsenal	Association football	England	$1.19
8	New York Giants	American football	United States	$1.18
9	Houston Texans	American football	United States	$1.17
10	New York Jets	American football	United States	$1.14

=== 2010 ===
Rank	Team	Sport	Country	Value (USD billion)
1	Manchester United	Association football	England	$1.83
2	Dallas Cowboys	American football	United States	$1.65
3	New York Yankees	Baseball	United States	$1.6
4	Washington Redskins	American football	United States	$1.55
5	New England Patriots	American football	United States	$1.36
6	Real Madrid	Association football	Spain	$1.32
7	New York Giants	American football	United States	$1.18
8	Arsenal	Association football	England	$1.18
9	New York Jets	American football	United States	$1.17
10	Houston Texans	American football	United States	$1.15

== See also ==
- Major professional sports leagues in the United States and Canada#Franchise valuations
- Forbes list of the most valuable soccer teams
- Forbes list of the most valuable MLB teams
- Forbes list of the most valuable NBA teams
- Forbes list of the most valuable NHL teams
- Forbes list of the most valuable NFL teams
- Forbes list of the most valuable MLS clubs
