= Christopher J. Harper =

American professor and former journalist

- Born: October 1, 1951 (age 74); Boise, Idaho
- Other names: Chris Harper, Chris J. Harper
- Education: Bachelor's degree in journalism and English literature, University of Nebraska–Lincoln, 1973; Master's degree in journalism, Northwestern University, 1974
- Occupations: Print and television reporter, Educator
- Years active: 1974 - 1995
- Notable credit(s): Newsweek Beirut bureau chief (1979-1980) ABC News Cairo bureau chief (1981) ABC News Rome bureau chief (1981 - 1986)

Christopher J. Harper is an American professor and former journalist.

== Early life and education ==
Born October 1, 1951, in Boise, Idaho, Harper graduated with a bachelor's degree in journalism and English literature from the University of Nebraska–Lincoln in 1973. He earned a master's degree in journalism in 1974 from Northwestern University.

== Career ==
As a reporter for Newsweek, Harper reported on Jonestown, Guyana, in November 1978. His reporting was nominated for a National Magazine Award.

As Beirut bureau chief for Newsweek in 1979-1980, Harper reported on the continuing Lebanese civil war and the Iran hostage crisis. He was expelled from Iraq in 1980 for his reporting about Saddam Hussein, whom Harper described as "The Butcher of Baghdad."

As Cairo bureau chief for ABC News in 1981, Harper was expelled by Anwar Sadat in September 1981 for interviewing a previously expelled correspondent in Beirut.

During his work as a correspondent and then bureau chief in Rome from 1981 to 1986, Harper reported on the 1981 plot to kill Pope John Paul II, 1982 Israeli invasion of Lebanon, the 1983 bombing of the Marine barracks that left 241 soldiers and Navy seaman dead, and the 1985 hijacking of TWA Flight 847 for which he and his team were nominated for five Emmy awards.

Harper joined 20/20 in 1986 and worked there until 1995.

He left the news business to teach journalism at New York University in 1995 and later at Temple University, where he headed the Multimedia Urban Reporting Lab. He now teaches multiple classes within the journalism department such as Journalism and the Law International Reporting, and Ethics of Journalism.

Harper has edited and written seven books, including one of the first about the digital age and its influence on journalism. The 1998 book, And That’s the Way It Will Be. His 2011 book, Flyover Country, documents the history of his high school graduation class of 1969 from Lincoln High School in Sioux Falls, South Dakota.

Harper wrote a column on the journalism industry for The Washington Times beginning in January 2013. His last column was published on Wednesday, May 27, 2015.

Harper currently writes a weekly column for DaTechGuyblog every Tuesday.

== Selected bibliography ==
- Harper, Christopher J. (1999). And That's the Way It Will Be: News and Information in a Digital World. New York University Press. ISBN 978-0-8147-3608-1.
- Harper, Christopher J. (2010). Flyover Country: Baby Boomers and Their Stories. Hamilton Books. ISBN 978-0-7618-5332-9.
