= List of professional sports leagues by revenue =

This is a list of professional sports leagues by revenue. Individual sports are not included.

The "Season" column refers to the sports league season for which financial data is available and referenced, which is usually not the most recently completed season of competition. Revenue is listed in millions of euros. The "Tier Level" column refers to the importance/division in their respective countries/leagues. For example, in Germany, Bundesliga is the first division/level, compared to 2. Bundesliga which is the second division/level.

== List ==
Rank	League	Sport	Country(ies)	Season	Tier level	Teams (Note: Number of teams in the season referenced in this table. Due to league expansion and contraction, does not necessarily match the number of current teams.)	Matches/ games/ events	Rev. (€ mil)	Rev. / team (€ mil)	Rev. / match (€ thousands)	Ref.
1	National Football League (NFL)	American football	United States	2025	1	32	285	20,985 (Note: Cited revenue was $23.5 billion, exchange rate of 1 USD = 0.89 EUR used here for 2025 season.)	655.8	73,632	
2	National Basketball Association (NBA)	Basketball	United States; Canada	2025–26	1	30	1,320	12,234 (Note: Cited revenue was $13.7 billion, exchange rate of 1 USD = 0.89 EUR used here for 2025–26 season.)	408	9,268	
3	Major League Baseball (MLB)	Baseball	United States; Canada	2025	1	30	2,472	11,787 (Note: Cited revenue was $13.2 billion, exchange rate of 1 USD = 0.89 EUR used here for 2025 season.)	392.9	4,768	
4	Premier League (PL)	Association football	United Kingdom (Note: As of the 2025/26 season, five Welsh clubs compete in the English football league system, of whom none are currently in the Premier League, two (Swansea City and Wrexham) are in the Championship, one (Cardiff City) is in League One, and one (Newport County) is in League Two. Other Welsh teams compete in the Welsh football league system.)	2024–25	1	20	380	7,880	394	18,684	
5	National Hockey League (NHL)	Ice hockey	Canada; United States	2025–26	1	32	1,400	7,040 (Note: Projected revenue was $8 billion, exchange rate of 1 USD = 0.88 EUR used here for 2025–26 season.)	220	5,029	
6	Campeonato Nacional de Liga de Primera División (La Liga)	Association football	Spain	2024–25	1	20	380	5,460	273	13,789	
7	Fußball-Bundesliga (Bundesliga)	Association football	Germany	2024–25	1	18	306	4,250	236.1	14,549	
8	Lega Nazionale Professionisti Serie A (Serie A)	Association football	Italy	2024–25	1	20	380	4,038	201.9	9,521	
9	Major League Soccer (MLS)	Association football	United States; Canada	2025	1	30 (Note: The number of teams expanded to 30 in 2025.)	510	2,425 (Note: Cited revenue was $2.500B per Sportico; exchange rate of 0.97 euro (€2.425B) per USD for 2025 season used here.)	80.5	4,174	
10	Championnat de France de football (Ligue 1)	Association football	France; Monaco	2024–25	1	18 (Note: The number of teams contracted to 18 in 2023.)	380	2,165.4	120.3	6,258	
11	Campeonato Brasileiro Série A (Brasileirão)	Association football	Brazil	2025	1	20	380	1,867 (Note: Source cites R$ 10,9 billion; average exchange rate used for 2025, 1 Brazilian real is equivalent to 0.1713 euros)	93.4	4,913	
12	Indian Premier League (IPL)	Twenty20 cricket	India	2025	1	10	74	1,602 (Note: Cited revenue was $1.8 billion, exchange rate of 1 USD = 0.89 EUR used here for 2025 season.)	160.2	21,649	
13	Nippon Professional Baseball (NPB)	Baseball	Japan	2019	1	12	878	1,506 (Note: Cited revenue was Yen JPY 180 billion; approximate average exchange rate of 0.008368 EUR for 1 JPY in 2020-06-20 used here.)	125.5	1,715	
14	Australian Football League (AFL)	Australian rules football	Australia	2025	1	18	216	1,355 (Note: Cited revenue was AUD$2178 million; exchange rate of AUD$1 = €0.62192 for 2025 season (7 October 2026) used here.)	75.3	6,273	
15	English Football League Championship (EFL Championship)	Association football	United Kingdom	2021–22	2	24	557	1,060 (Note: Cited revenue was £676 million; approximate average exchange rate of €1.1833 per £1 for 2021–22 season used here.)	44.1	1,903	
16	Russian Premier League (RPL)	Association football	Russia	2021–22	1	16	240	1,050	65.6	4,375	
17	2. Fußball-Bundesliga (2. Bundesliga)	Association football	Germany	2022–23	2	18	306	785.7	43.7	2,567	
18	Minor League Baseball (MiLB)	Baseball	United States; Canada	2019	2–5	120	8,400	760 (Note: Cited revenue was estimated at $864 million; exchange rate of €0.88 per $1 for 2019 season.)	6.3	90.5	
19	EuroLeague	Basketball	Europe; Israel; United Arab Emirates	2021–22	1 (Int.)	18	260	665 (Note: Cited revenue was estimated at $650 million; exchange rate of €1.0231 per $1 for 2022-10-19 used here.)	36.9	2,350	
20	Eredivisie	Association football	Netherlands	2021–22	1	18	312	629	34.9	2,016	
21	Chinese Basketball Association (CBA)	Basketball	China	2015–16	1	20	405	575.8 (Note: Cited revenue was USD 655 million; approximate average exchange rate of USD 0.88 per EUR 1 for March 2016 used here.)	28.8	1,422	
22	J1 League	Association football	Japan	2023	1	18 (Note: The number of teams has expanded to 20 in 2024.)	306	564.65 (Note: Cited revenue was ¥86.388B; exchange rate of ¥1=€0.00654 for 2023 season used here.)	31.3	1,845	
23	Primeira Liga	Association football	Portugal	2021–22	1	18	306	557	30.9	1,820	
24	Liga MX	Association football	Mexico	2018–19	1	18	334	555 (Note: Cited revenue was 16.B$, exchange rate of 1 USD = 0.8329 EUR used here for end of 2017)	30.8	1,662	
25	Turkish Süper Lig	Association football	Turkey	2021–22	1	20	380	533	26.6	1,403	
26	Korea Baseball Organization League (KBO League)	Baseball	South Korea	2025	1	10	720	523.78 (Note: Cited revenue was ₩779.5B; exchange rate of 1 KRW = 0.00067 EUR for 2025 season used here.)	52.38	727.472	
27	National Rugby League (NRL)	Rugby league football	Australia; New Zealand	2025	1	17	213	516 (Note: Cited revenue was 845.6 mln. in AU$; exchange rate of AU$1=€0.61 for 2025 season used here.)	25.1	2,422.54	
28	Belgian Pro League	Association football	Belgium	2021–22	1	18 (Note: The number of teams contracted to 16 in 2023, but will return to 18 starting in the 2026–27 seasoh.)	330	494	27.4	1,497	
29	Liga Profesional de Fútbol	Association football	Argentina	2018–19	1	26 (Note: The number of teams has contracted to 24 in 2019, expanded to 26 in 2021, 28 in 2022, and contracted to 22 since 2026.)	325	490.8	18.9	1,510	
30	Campeonato Nacional de Liga de Segunda División (La Liga 2)	Association football	Spain; Andorra	2022–23	2	22	468	457.6	20.8	977	
31	Lega Nazionale Professionisti B (Serie B)	Association football	Italy	2021–22	2	20	380	456.5	22.8	1,201	
32	Kontinental Hockey League (KHL)	Ice hockey	Russia; Belarus; China; Kazakhstan	2022–23	1	22 (Note: The number of teams has expanded to 23 in 2023.)	748	425 (Note: Cited revenue was estimated at ₽34B; exchange rate of 1 euro per ₽80 for 2022–23 season used here.)	19.3	568	
33	Championnat de France de football de Ligue 2 (Ligue 2)	Association football	France	2022–23	2	20 (Note: The number of teams has contracted to 18 in 2024.)	380	423	21.15	1,113	
34	Championnat de France de rugby à XV (Top 14)	Rugby union football	France	2021–22	1	14	187	371	26.5	1,984	
35	Scottish Premiership (SPFL)	Association football	United Kingdom	2023–24	1	12	258	378	31.5	1,465	
36	Women's National Basketball Association (WNBA)	Basketball	United States (Note: The WNBA added a Canadian team in 2026.)	2025	1	15 (Note: The number of teams expanded to 15 in 2026, and will expand further to 16 in 2028, 17 in 2029, and 18 in 2030.)	330	344.5 (Note: Cited revenue was $403 million, exchange rate of 1 USD = 0.93 EUR used here for 18 June 2024)	26.6	668	
37	J2 League	Association football	Japan	2023	2	22 (Note: The number of teams contracted to 20 in 2024.)	465	294.65 (Note: Cited revenue was ¥45.045B; exchange rate of ¥1=€0.00654 for 2023 season used here.)	13.4	634	
38	Danish Superliga	Association football	Denmark	2021–22	1	12	193	287	23.9	1,487	
39	K League 1	Association football	South Korea	2019	1	12	228	287 (Note: Cited revenue was ₩371.9B; exchange rate of 1,296 KRW = 1 EUR used here for 2019 season.)	23.9	1,258	
40	Austrian Football Bundesliga	Association football	Austria	2020–21	1	12	195	267	22.2	1,369	
41	English Football League One (EFL League One)	Association football	United Kingdom	2021–22	3	24	557	260.3 (Note: Cited revenue was £220 million; approximate average exchange rate of €1.1833 per £1 for 2021–22 season used here.)	10.8	471	
42	Swiss Super League	Association football	Switzerland; Liechtenstein (Note: Football clubs based in Liechtenstein all play in the Swiss league system. As of 2021, FC Vaduz have been promoted to and relegated from the Super League three times.)	2021–22	1	10 (Note: The number of teams has expanded to 12 in 2023.)	180	248	24.8	1,378	
43	3. Fußball-Liga	Association football	Germany	2022–23	3	20	373	234.7	11.7	629	
44	Eliteserien	Association football	Norway	2025	1	16	240	230	14.4	958	
45	B1 League	Basketball	Japan	2021–22	1	22 (Note: The number of teams has expanded to 24 in 2022.)	660	227.7 (Note: Cited revenue was ¥29.962B; exchange rate of ¥1=€0.0076 for 2021–22 season used here.)	10.3	345	
46	Premiership Rugby	Rugby union football	United Kingdom	2022–23	1	11 (Note: The number of teams contracted to 10 in 2023.)	130	218.2 (Note: Cited revenue was £191.12 million; approximate average exchange rate of €1.1415 per £1 for 2022–23 season used here.)	19.9	1,678	
47	Lega Italiana Calcio Professionistico (Serie C)	Association football	Italy	2022–23	3	60	1,187	216.2	3.6	182	
48	Allsvenskan	Association football	Sweden	2022	1	16	240	210	13.1	875	
49	Ekstraklasa	Association football	Poland	2022–23	1	18	306	206.5 (Note: Cited revenue was zł921 million; approximate average exchange rate of zł 4.46 per €1 for 2022–23 season used here.)	11.4	674	
50	National Women's Soccer League (NWSL)	Association football	United States	2024	1	14 (Note: The number of teams expanded to 16 in 2026, and will expand further to 18 in 2028.)	182	193.2 (Note: Cited revenue was $215 million, exchange rate of 1 USD = 0.90 EUR used here for 25 September 2024.)	13.8	1,062	
51	Big Bash League (BBL)	Twenty20 cricket	Australia	2018–19	1	8	59	173 (Note: Exchange rate of €0.8782 per $1 for 2018–19 season used here.)	21.6	2,932	
52	English Football League Two (EFL League Two)	Association football	United Kingdom	2021–22	4	24	557	170 (Note: Cited revenue was £124 million; approximate average exchange rate of €1.1833 per £1 for 2021–22 season used here.)	7	305	
53	National League (NL)	Ice hockey	Switzerland	2013–14	1	12 (Note: The number of teams expanded to 13 in 2021 and 14 in 2022.)	339	167	13.9	493	
54	Swedish Hockey League (SHL)	Ice hockey	Sweden	2021–22	1	14	364	159.2	11.3	437	
55	Super League Greece	Association football	Greece	2021–22	1	14	240	159	11.3	663	
56	Nemzeti Bajnokság I	Association football	Hungary	2021–22	1	12	198	158	13.1	798	
57	Deutsche Eishockey Liga (DEL)	Ice hockey	Germany	2022–23	1	15 (Note: The number of teams contracted to 14 in 2023.)	466	150	10	322	
58	United Rugby Championship (Note: This competition was previously known as Pro14 Championship.)	Rugby union football	Ireland; Italy; United Kingdom; South Africa	2023–24	1 (Int.)	16	151	148.6 (Note: Cited revenue was US$160 million; approximate average exchange rate of US$1 per €0.92866 for 2023–24 season used here.)	9.3	984	
59	Championnat de France de rugby à XV de 2e division (Rugby Pro D2)	Rugby union football	France	2021–22	2	16	245	144	9	587	
60	Canadian Football League (CFL)	Canadian football	Canada	2018	1	9	86	143 (Note: Cited revenue was 210 million Canadian dollars; exchange rate of 1.468 CAD = 1 EUR used here for 2013)	15.9	1,663	
61	Israeli Premier League	Association football	Israel	2021–22	1	14	240	138	9.8	575	
62	Liga de la Asociación de Clubs de Baloncesto (Liga ACB)	Basketball	Spain; Andorra	2021–22	1	18	306	136	7.56	444	
63	Caribbean Premier League (CPL)	Twenty20 cricket	Antigua and Barbuda; Barbados; Guyana; Jamaica; Saint Kitts and Nevis; Saint Lucia; Saint Vincent and the Grenadines; Trinidad and Tobago	2022	1	7	34	134.7 (Note: Cited revenue was $134.7 million, exchange rate of 1 USD = 1 EUR used here for 2022 season.)	22.4	3,961	
64	Super Rugby	Rugby union football	Australia; New Zealand; Fiji	2023	1 (Int.)	12 (Note: The number of teams in 2023 was 12; the total at 2025 was contracted down to 11.)	91	125.4 (Note: Cited revenue was US$135 million; approximate average exchange rate of US$1 per €0.92866 for 2023 season used here.)	10.25	1,356	
65	Ukrainian Premier League (UPL)	Association football	Ukraine	2021–22	1	16	143	118	7.3	825	
66	Liiga	Ice hockey	Finland	2021–22	1	15	495	114.6	7.6	231	
67	Saudi Professional League (SPL)	Association football	Saudi Arabia	2022–23	1	16 (Note: SPL expanded to 18 teams in 2023.)	240	111.1 (Note: Revenue was estimated at SAR450 million; Exchange rate of €0.24698 per 1 SAR for 2023-08-27 used here.)	6.9	463	
68	Basketball Bundesliga (BBL)	Basketball	Germany	2021–22	1	18	330	109.6	6.1	332	
69	Handball-Bundesliga (HBL)	Handball	Germany	2018–19	1	18	306	105	5.8	343	
70	Categoría Primera A	Association football	Colombia	2022	1	20	451	102 (Note: Exchange rate of COP 5189.0573 per €1 for 2022 season used here.)	5.1	226	
71	Croatian First Football League (1. HNL)	Association football	Croatia	2021–22	1	10	180	97	9.7	539	
72	Czech First League	Association football	Czech Republic	2021–22	1	16	276	97	6.0	351	
73	Cypriot First Division	Association football	Cyprus	2021–22	1	12 (Note: The number of teams has expanded to 14 in 2022.)	192	95	7.9	495	
74	Egyptian Premier League	Association football	Egypt	2022	1	20	306	95	4.7	310	
75	Ligue Nationale de Basket Pro A (LNB Pro A) (Note: The league's name changed after the 2022–23 season to LNB Élite.)	Basketball	France; Monaco	2021–22	1	18	328	93.5	5.2	285	
76	Mexican Baseball League (Liga Mexicana de Béisbol; LMB)	Baseball	Mexico (Note: The Tecolotes de los Dos Laredos play half their season in the United States.)	2022	1	18 (Note: The number of teams has expanded to 20 in 2024.)	900	93 (Note: Cited revenue was Mex$2 billion; exchange rate of Mex$21.5 per €1 for 2022 season used here.)	5.1	103	
77	Liga I	Association football	Romania	2021–22	1	16	316	90	5.6	285	
78	J3 League	Association football	Japan	2023	3	20	380	85.7 (Note: Cited revenue was ¥13.108B; exchange rate of ¥1=€0.00654 for 2023 season used here.)	4.3	226	
79	Chinese Professional Baseball League (CPBL)	Baseball	Taiwan	2025	1	6	372	84.2 (Note: Cited revenue was TWD$31 billion; exchange rate of €0.02716 = TWD$1 for 2025 used here.)	14.03	226.31	
80	Campeonato Brasileiro Série B (Série B)	Association football	Brazil	2020	2	20	380	84.1 (Note: Cited revenue was estimated at $100 million; Exchange rate $1.1884 per €1 used for 7 April 2021.)	4.2	221	
81	Chinese Football Association Super League (CSL)	Association football	China	2022	1	16	240	75.8 (Note: Cited revenue was estimated at 580 million yuan; Exchange rate 7.65 yuan per €1 used for 5 February 2024.)	4.7	316	
82	Mexican Pacific League (Liga Mexicana del Pacífico; LMP)	Baseball	Mexico	2012–13	1	8	306	72	9	235	
83	Women's Premier League (cricket) (WPL)	Twenty20 cricket	India	2023	1	5	22	71.13 (Note: Cited revenue was ₹636.90 crore, using an exchange rate of ₹1 = €0.01117 as of 31 March 2023.)	14.23	3,233.2	
84	Kazakhstan Premier League	Association football	Kazakhstan	2022	1	14	182	70	5.0	385	
85	Swiss Challenge League	Association football	Switzerland; Liechtenstein	2019–20	2	10	180	67.1 (Note: Cited revenue was estimated at $79.8 million; Exchange rate $1.1884 per €1 used for 7 April 2021.)	6.7	373	
86	UAE Pro League	Association football	United Arab Emirates	2021–22	1	14	182	65.8 (Note: Cited revenue was 265 million AED. exchange rate of 1 EUR = 4.0848 AED for March 2022 used here.)	4.7	367	
87	Indian Super League (ISL)	Association football	India	2023–24	1	12	163	65	6.5	684	
88	Serbian SuperLiga	Association football	Serbia	2021–22	1	16	296	65	4.0	220	
89	First Professional Football League (Bulgarian First League)	Association football	Bulgaria	2021–22	1	14 (Note: The number of teams has contracted to 16 in 2022.)	222	64	4.5	288	
90	A-League Men	Association football	Australia; New Zealand	2023–24	1	12	169	63 (Note: Cited revenue was 100M AUS$, exchange rate of 1 AUD = 0.63 EUR used here for May 2018)	6.3	450	
91	Super League	Rugby league football	United Kingdom; France (Note: Crusaders, from Wales, competed from 2009 to 2011. Toronto Wolfpack, from Canada, competed in 2020.)	2015	1	12 (Note: The number of teams contracted to 11 in 2020 and expanded to 12 in 2021.)	195	60	5.0	308	
92	Ligue 3	Association football	France	2019–20	3	18	223	57.4 (Note: Cited revenue was estimated at $68.2 million; Exchange rate $1.1884 per €1 used for 7 April 2021.)	3.2	257	
93	Women's Super League (WSL)	Association football	United Kingdom	2022–23	1	12 (Note: The number of teams will expand to 14 starting with the 2026–27 season.)	132	56.6 (Note: Cited revenue was £48 million; approximate average exchange rate of €1.18 per £1 for 2022–23 season used here.)	4.7	429	
94	Chilean Primera División	Association football	Chile	2023	1	16	240	55.3 (Note: Cited revenue was CLP$48.151 billion; exchange rate of €0.00115 = CLP$1 for 2023 used here.)	3.4	230	
95	Bangladesh Premier League (BPL)	Twenty20 cricket	Bangladesh	2016–17	1	7 (Note: The number of teams has contracted to 6 in 2022, expanded to 7 in 2023.)	46	53.5	7.6	1,164	
96	South African Premiership	Association football	South Africa	2019–20	1	16	240	53.4	3.3	222	
97	Slovak Super Liga	Association football	Slovakia	2021–22	1	12	195	51	4.2	262	
98	Azerbaijan Premier League	Association football	Azerbaijan	2021–22	1	8 (Note: The number of teams has expanded to 10 in 2022.)	112	47	5.8	420	
99	LNB Pro B (Note: The league's name changed after the 2024–25 season to Élite 2.)	Basketball	France	2021–22	2	18	326	46.2	2.5	142	
100	I liga polska	Association football	Poland	2022–23	2	18	309	43.5 (Note: Cited revenue was zł194.1 million; approximate average exchange rate of zł 4.46 per €1 for 2022–23 season used here.)	2.4	141	
101	National Basketball League (NBL)	Basketball	Australia; New Zealand	2023–24	1	10	140	43.4 (Note: Cited revenue was A$70 million; approximate average exchange rate of A$1 per €0.61941 for 2023–24 season used here.)	4.34	310	
102	Belarusian Premier League (Vyšejšaja Liha)	Association football	Belarus	2022	1	16 (Note: The number of teams has contracted to 15 in 2023.)	240	42	2.6	175	
103	Challenger Pro League	Association football	Belgium	2019–20	2	8 (Note: Challenger Pro has expanded to 12 teams in 2022. The number of teams will further increase to 16 in 2023.)	114	41.2	5.1	362	
104	Deutsche Eishockey Liga 2 (DEL2)	Ice hockey	Germany	2021–22	2	14	410	40.6	2.9	99	
105	Superettan	Association football	Sweden	2020	2	16	240	39.1 (Note: Cited revenue was estimated at $46.56 million; Exchange rate $1.1884 per €1 used for 7 April 2021.)	2.4	163	
106	Danish 1st Division	Association football	Denmark	2019–20	2	12	198	35.7 (Note: Cited revenue was estimated at $42.4 million; Exchange rate $1.1884 per €1 used for 7 April 2021.)	2.9	180	
107	Lietuvos krepšinio lyga (LKL)	Basketball	Lithuania	2023–24	1	11	185	34	3.1	184	
108	Veikkausliiga	Association football	Finland	2022	1	12	167	33	2.7	198	
109	Pro Kabaddi League (PKL)	Kabaddi	India	2024	1	12	138	29.46 (Note: Cited revenue was ₹2,721.86 crore; exchange rate of ₹1 = €0.01082 for 31 March 2025 used here.)	2.46	213.5	
110	Latvian Higher League	Association football	Latvia	2022	1	10	180	29	2.9	161	
111	Persian Gulf Pro League	Association football	Iran	2015–16	1	16	240	29	1.8	121	
112	Besta deild karla	Association football	Iceland	2022	1	12	162	27	2.2	167	
113	Primera B de Chile	Association football	Chile	2020	2	15 (Note: The number of teams has expanded to 16 in 2021.)	218	26.92 (Note: Cited revenue was estimated at $32 million; Exchange rate $1.1884 per €1 used for 7 April 2021.)	1.8	128	
114	Ekstraliga	Speedway	Poland	2021	1	8	64	26.3 (Note: Cited revenue was zł120 million; approximate average exchange rate of zł 4.55 per €1 for 2021 season used here.)	3.3	471	
115	League of Ireland Premier Division	Association football	Ireland; United Kingdom	2022	1	10	180	26	2.6	144	
116	Campeonato Brasileiro Série C (Série C)	Association football	Brazil	2020	3	20	206	25.2 (Note: Cited revenue was estimated at $30 million; Exchange rate $1.1884 per €1 used for 7 April 2021.)	1.2	122	
117	Primera Categoría Serie A (Ecuadorian Serie A)	Association football	Ecuador	2018	1	12 (Note: The number of teams has expanded to 16 in 2019.)	266	25	2.1	94	

== See also ==
- Major professional sports leagues in the United States and Canada
- List of attendance figures at domestic professional sports leagues
- Forbes list of the world's highest-paid athletes
- Forbes list of the most valuable football clubs
- Forbes list of the most valuable sports teams
- List of sports attendance figures
- Deloitte Football Money League
- List of largest sports contracts
