= Analytic journalism =

Field of journalism

Analytic journalism is a field of journalism that seeks to make sense of complex reality in order to create public understanding. It combines aspects of investigative journalism and explanatory reporting. Analytic journalism can be seen as a response to professionalized communication from powerful agents, information overload, and growing complexity in a globalised world. It aims to create evidence-based interpretations of reality, often confronting dominant ways of understanding a specific phenomenon.

Analytic journalism is distinctive in terms of research practices and journalistic product. At times, it uses methods from social science research. The journalist gains expertise on a particular topic, to identify a phenomenon that is not readily obvious. At its best, investigative journalism is deeply analytic, but its intent is primarily to expose, whereas analytic journalism's primary aim is to explain. It contextualizes its subject by describing background, historical details, and statistical data. The goal is a comprehensive explanation that shapes audience perception of the phenomenon. Analytic journalism aspires to collect disparate data and make connections that are not immediately apparent. Its effectiveness is often in the analysis between the facts rather than the facts themselves and is critically engaged with other arguments and explanations. In this way, analytic journalists attempt to give a deeper understanding of an issue.

== Material for analytic journalists ==
Analytic journalists use critical methods to present information in a distinct way, differing from event-driven hard news. This means testing hypotheses and assumptions scientifically against evidence. An important part of analytic journalism is finding new ways to frame the world. The result of this is to highlight previously overlooked points of view, substantiated by data or other evidence.

== Additional definitions ==
According to Adam and Clark Analytic journalists should retrieve and adapt methodologies from other disciplines to enlarge journalism so that it incorporates knowledge and methods generated by historians, social scientists, anthropologists, and critics.

The Institute of Analytic Journalism employs a rather general definition and positions it within a critical approach: "critical thinking and analysis using a variety of intellectual tools and methods to understand multiple phenomena and to communicate the results of those insights to multiple audiences in a variety of ways."

A more pragmatic definition, suggested by Johnson, points out the necessary variables of analytic thinking: "Frame the appropriate question, find and retrieve appropriate data, use appropriate analytic tools, show what you know with story-appropriate media." De Burgh compares analytic journalism with news reporting: "News reporting is descriptive and news reporters are admired when they describe in a manner that is accurate, explanatory, vivid or moving, regardless of medium. Analytic journalism, on the other hand, seeks to take the data available and reconfigure it, helping us to ask questions about the situation or statement or see it in a different way." Therefore, de Burgh sees the role of analytic journalists as follows: "The duties if today’s journalist can be divided roughly into three basic functions: Hunter-gatherer of information, Filter, and Explainer. Only in our role as ‘explainer’, as storyteller, do journalists appear to have a reasonable secure position. To ‘explain’, they have to more than ‘report’… what a Prime minister or a general has to say."

== How analytic journalism supplements other forms of journalism ==
While investigative journalism aims at exposing, analytic journalism aims at explaining. Following a trail of evidence, investigative journalism is more inclined to follow a particular guilty party, while analytic journalism is more inclined to follow that evidence to broaden understanding of the issue or phenomenon. Analytic journalism focuses on creating meaning out of information that may not be hidden but dispersed.

Analytic journalism incorporates different journalistic approaches, strategies, and genres. The graphic below illustrates the unique characteristics of analytic journalism. It illustrates how analytic journalism draws from multiple, but not all, journalistic disciplines.

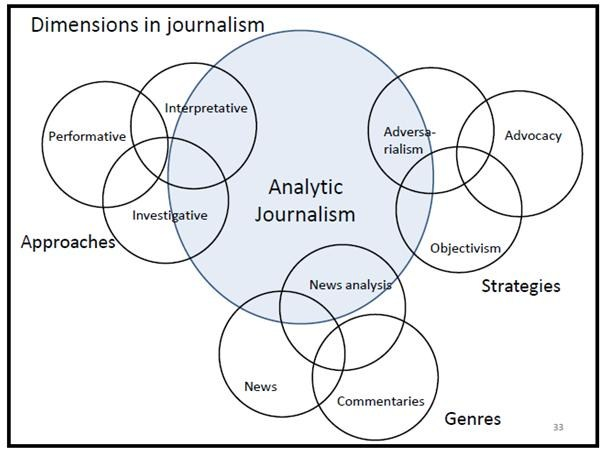
Dimensions in journalism
