= List of the most valuable football clubs in the Americas =

This is a list of the most valuable association football clubs in the Americas as ranked by Fox Sports and Forbes Mexico, and their worth in U.S. dollars.

== 2022 rankings ==
According to Forbes from Feb 2, 2023

Rank	Team	Country	Value (million US$)
1	Los Angeles FC	United States	1,000
2	LA Galaxy	United States	925
3	Atlanta United FC	United States	850
4	New York City FC	United States	800
5	D.C. United	United States	700
6	Toronto FC	Canada	690
7	Austin FC	United States	680
8	Seattle Sounders FC	United States	660
9	Portland Timbers	United States	650
10	Charlotte FC	United States	625

== 2020 rankings ==
According to Forbes Mexico, as of 22 February 2021

Rank	Team	Country	Value (million US$)
1	Atlanta United FC	United States	1,400
2	Corinthians	Brazil	582.3
3	Palmeiras	Brazil	525.1
4	Los Angeles FC	United States	474.1
5	New England Revolution	United States	352.7
6	D.C. United	United States	311.5
7	C.F. Monterrey	Mexico	311
8	Sporting Kansas City	United States	278.7
9	River Plate	Argentina	270
10	Grêmio	Brazil	246.4

MLS team valuations according to Sportico, as of 14 July 2021

Rank	Team	Country	Value (million US$)
1	Los Angeles FC	United States	860
2	Atlanta United FC	United States	845
3	LA Galaxy	United States	835
4	Seattle Sounders FC	United States	705
5	New York City FC	United States	655
6	Toronto FC	Canada	650
7	Portland Timbers	United States	635
8	D.C. United	United States	630
9	Austin FC	United States	575
10	Sporting Kansas City	United States	550

== Historical rankings ==
=== 2018 rankings ===
According to Forbes Mexico, as of 26 July 2018

Rank	Team	Country	Value (million US$)
1	Corinthians	Brazil	462.2
2	Palmeiras	Brazil	424.1
3	Los Angeles FC	United States	406
4	New England Revolution	United States	351.2
5	Grêmio	Brazil	313
6	C.D. Guadalajara	Mexico	297.1
7	C.F. Monterrey	Mexico	281.8
8	New York Red Bulls	United States	264.1
9	River Plate	Argentina	219.1
10	Boca Juniors	Argentina	213.1
11	Internacional	Brazil	201.1
12	Los Angeles Galaxy	United States	200.1
13	Orlando City SC	United States	188.1
14	Flamengo	Brazil	175.8
15	Club América	Mexico	60.00

=== 2016 rankings ===
According to Fox Sports, as of 29 December 2016

Rank	Team	Country	Value (million US$)
1	Corinthians	Brazil	532.7
2	Palmeiras	Brazil	480.1
3	Grêmio	Brazil	320.9
4	CD Guadalajara	Mexico	273.1
5	Monterrey	Mexico	270
6	Los Angeles Galaxy	United States	265
7	Seattle Sounders FC	United States	260
8	New York City FC	United States	255
9	Orlando City SC	United States	240
10	Houston Dynamo	United States	215
11	São Paulo	Brazil	188.3
12	Club America	Mexico	187.6
13	Portland Timbers	United States	185
14	Toronto FC	Canada	180
15	Sporting Kansas City	United States	165

== See also ==
- List of professional sports leagues by revenue
- Forbes' list of the most valuable football clubs
