= Forbes list of the most valuable football clubs =

This is a list of the richest association football clubs in the world as ranked by Forbes magazine on their worth in U.S. dollars.

== 2026 ==
As of May 2026

Rank 2026	Rank 2025	Team	Country	Value in $ billions	% change on year	Revenue ($M)
1	1	Real Madrid	Spain	9.5	41	1,265
2	3	Barcelona	Spain	7.5	33	1,063
3	2	Manchester United	England	7.2	9	865
4	4	Liverpool	England	6.2	15	911
5	7	Paris Saint-Germain	France	5.8	26	912
6	6	Bayern Munich	Germany	5.7	12	938
7	5	Manchester City	England	5.5	4	900
8	8	Arsenal	England	5.4	59	895
9	10	Chelsea	England	4.2	29	637
10	9	Tottenham Hotspur	England	3	-9	733
11	13	Atlético Madrid	Spain	2.95	74	488
12	11	Juventus	Italy	2.4	12	458
13	12	Borussia Dortmund	Germany	2.2	7	579
14	14	Milan	Italy	1.85	23	447
15	17	Internazionale	Italy	1.8	57	586
16	22	Aston Villa	England	1.4	56	490
17	16	Inter Miami	United States	1.35	13	200
18	15	Los Angeles FC	United States	1.32	6	167
19	19	Newcastle United	England	1.25	14	435
20	20	LA Galaxy	United States	1.08	8	106
21	23	New York City FC	United States	1.02	17	90
22	21	Atlanta United	United States	1	3	105
23	–	Benfica	Portugal	0.960	N/A	252
24	27	Roma	Italy	0.940	N/A	242
25	–	Everton	England	0.93	N/A	255
26	25	Fulham	England	0.92	8	253
27	24	Brighton & Hove Albion	England	0.91	6	295
28	–	VfB Stuttgart	Germany	0.88	N/A	323
29	28	Seattle Sounders	United States	0.86	8	100
30	26	Austin FC	United States	0.855	4	94

== Previous rankings ==
=== Number one by year ===
Year	Team	League	Value (USD million)
2026	(Spain) Real Madrid	La Liga	$9,500
2025	(Spain) Real Madrid	La Liga	$6,750
2024	(Spain) Real Madrid	La Liga	$6,600
2023	(Spain) Real Madrid	La Liga	$6,070
2022	(Spain) Real Madrid	La Liga	$5,100
2021	(Spain) Barcelona	La Liga	$4,760
2020	(Spain) Real Madrid	La Liga	$4,180
2019	(Spain) Real Madrid	La Liga	$4,239
2018	(England) Manchester United	Premier League	$4,123
2017	(England) Manchester United	Premier League	$3,690
2016	(Spain) Real Madrid	La Liga	$3,645
2015	(Spain) Real Madrid	La Liga	$3,260
2014	(Spain) Real Madrid	La Liga	$3,440
2013	(Spain) Real Madrid	La Liga	$3,300
2012	(England) Manchester United	Premier League	$2,235
2011	(England) Manchester United	Premier League	$1,864
2010	(England) Manchester United	Premier League	$1,835
2009	(England) Manchester United	Premier League	$1,870
2008	(England) Manchester United	Premier League	$1,800
2007	(England) Manchester United	Premier League	$1,453

=== 2025 ===
As of May 2025

Rank 2025	Rank 2024	Team	Country	Value in $ billions	% change on year	Revenue ($M)
1	1	Real Madrid	Spain	6.75	2	1,129
2	2	Manchester United	England	6.6	1	834
3	3	Barcelona	Spain	5.65	2	821
4	4	Liverpool	England	5.4	1	773
5	5	Manchester City	England	5.3	4	901
6	6	Bayern Munich	Germany	5.1	2	827
7	7	Paris Saint-Germain	France	4.6	5	870
8	10	Arsenal	England	3.4	31	771
9	8	Tottenham Hotspur	England	3.3	3	666
10	9	Chelsea	England	3.25	4	591
11	11	Juventus	Italy	2.15	5	389
12	12	Borussia Dortmund	Germany	2.05	4	555
13	13	Atlético Madrid	Spain	1.7	6	442
14	14	Milan	Italy	1.5	5	433
15	15	Los Angeles FC	United States	1.25	4	150
16	17	Inter Miami	United States	1.2	17	180
17	18	Internazionale	Italy	1.15	15	430
18	16	West Ham United	England	1.125	2	349
19	–	Newcastle United	England	1.1	38	403
20	19	LA Galaxy	United States	1.0	5	95
21	20	Atlanta United	United States	0.975	8	105
22	–	Aston Villa	England	0.9	13	343
23	–	New York City FC	United States	0.875	3	78
24	–	Brighton & Hove Albion	England	0.86	18	280
25	–	Fulham	England	0.85	8	229
26	–	Austin FC	United States	0.825	10	90
27	–	Roma	Italy	0.81	N/A	273
28	–	Seattle Sounders	United States	0.8	2	83
29	–	Crystal Palace	England	0.79	1	221
30	–	D.C. United	United States	0.785	1	90

=== 2024 ===
As of May 2024

Rank 2024	Rank 2023	Team	Country	Value in $ billions	% change on year	Debt as % of value	Revenue ($M)	Operating income ($M)
1	1	Real Madrid	Spain	6.6	9	15	873	76
2	2	Manchester United	England	6.55	9	10	785	187
3	3	Barcelona	Spain	5.6	2	31	840	-145
4	4	Liverpool	England	5.37	2	3	719	102
5	5	Manchester City	England	5.1	2	0	869	147
6	6	Bayern Munich	Germany	5.0	3	0	781	84
7	7	Paris Saint-Germain	France	4.4	4	2	754	-126
8	9	Tottenham Hotspur	England	3.2	14	33	665	161
9	8	Chelsea	England	3.13	1	20	620	0
10	10	Arsenal	England	2.6	15	1	560	140
11	11	Juventus	Italy	2.05	-5	2	459	11
12	12	Borussia Dortmund	Germany	1.98	2	1	441	75
13	13	Atlético Madrid	Spain	1.6	4	7	382	20
14	14	Milan	Italy	1.43	1	0	405	81
15	17	Los Angeles FC	United States	1.2	20	11	140	9
16	15	West Ham United	England	1.1	2	6	289	66
17	-	Inter Miami	United States	1.03	72	15	118	8
18	16	Internazionale	Italy	1.0	-3	44	398	39
19	18	LA Galaxy	United States	0.95	3	0	95	3
20	19	Atlanta United	United States	0.9	6	0	95	9

=== 2023 ===
As of May 2023

Rank 2023	Rank 2022	Team	Country	Value in $ millions	% change on year	Debt as % of value	Revenue ($M)	Operating income ($M)
1	1	Real Madrid	Spain	6,070	19	16	807	-38
2	3	Manchester United	England	6,000	30	11	779	108
3	2	Barcelona	Spain	5,508	10	13	721	53
4	4	Liverpool	England	5,288	19	2	793	129
5	6	Manchester City	England	4,990	18	0	815	175
6	5	Bayern Munich	Germany	4,860	13	0	739	133
7	7	Paris Saint-Germain	France	4,212	32	2	739	-219
8	8	Chelsea	England	3,100	0	0	642	35
9	10	Tottenham Hotspur	England	2,803	19	39	591	152
10	11	Arsenal	England	2,263	10	1	490	108
11	9	Juventus	Italy	2,160	-12	10	453	-90
12	12	Borussia Dortmund	Germany	1,928	7	0	403	91
13	13	Atlético Madrid	Spain	1,539	3	11	445	32
14	14	Milan	Italy	1,200	17	0	299	11
15	18	West Ham United	England	1,079	20	6	340	98
16	15	Internazionale	Italy	1,026	3	43	348	44
17	-	Los Angeles FC	United States	1,000	-	0	116	8
18	-	LA Galaxy	United States	925	-	0	98	4
19	-	Atlanta United	United States	850	-	0	81	6
20	-	Crystal Palace	England	806	-	0	214	22

=== 2022 ===
As of May 2022

Rank 2022	Rank 2021	Team	Country	Value in $ millions	% change on year	Debt as % of value	Revenue ($M)	Operating income ($M)
1	2	Real Madrid	Spain	5,100	7	11	761	90
2	1	Barcelona	Spain	5,000	5	15	692	-17
3	4	Manchester United	England	4,600	10	13	663	128
4	5	Liverpool	England	4,450	9	4	654	104
5	3	Bayern Munich	Germany	4,275	1	0	726	102
6	6	Manchester City	England	4,250	6	0	766	156
7	9	Paris Saint-Germain	France	3,200	28	3	661	-102
8	7	Chelsea	England	3,100	-3	0	586	45
9	11	Juventus	Italy	2,450	26	11	515	26
10	10	Tottenham Hotspur	England	2,350	2	45	483	127
11	8	Arsenal	England	2,050	-27	1	435	53
12	12	Borussia Dortmund	Germany	1,800	-5	0	402	20
13	13	Atlético Madrid	Spain	1,500	50	11	396	45
14	16	Milan	Italy	1,200	115	4	257	-16
15	14	Internazionale	Italy	1,000	35	41	393	3
16	15	Everton	England	940	43	13	259	-20
17	19	Leicester City	England	925	103	9	304	16
18	18	West Ham United	England	900	77	8	259	42
19	20+	Leeds United	England	800	-	0	229	51
20	20+	Aston Villa	England	750	-	0	236	12

=== 2021 ===
As of April 2021

Rank	Team	Country	Value in $ millions	% change on year	Debt as % of value	Revenue ($M)	Operating income ($M)
1	Barcelona	Spain	4,760	18	6	792	62
2	Real Madrid	Spain	4,750	12	6	790	92
3	Bayern Munich	Germany	4,215	39	0	703	49
4	Manchester United	England	4,200	10	16	643	167
5	Liverpool	England	4,100	88	2	619	62
6	Manchester City	England	4,000	49	0	609	-2
7	Chelsea	England	3,200	24	0	520	35
8	Arsenal	England	2,800	23	7	430	47
9	Paris Saint-Germain	France	2,500	129	0	599	-5
10	Tottenham Hotspur	England	2,300	42	39	494	134
11	Juventus	Italy	1,950	29	16	441	-14
12	Borussia Dortmund	Germany	1,900	112	0	405	15
13	Atlético Madrid	Spain	1,000	5	26	368	62
14	Internazionale	Italy	743	11	8	323	13
15	Everton	England	658	38	0	235	15
16	Milan	Italy	559	-4	4	165	-92
17	Roma	Italy	548	-12	56	156	-108
18	West Ham United	England	508	-18	18	175	-24
19	Leicester City	England	455	-	17	189	-49
20	Ajax	Netherlands	413	-	2	172	2

=== 2019 ===
As of May 2019

Rank	Team	Country	Value in millions	% change on year	Debt as % of value	Revenue ($M)
1	Real Madrid	Spain	4,239	4	1	896
2	Barcelona	Spain	4,205	-1	8	824
3	Manchester United	England	3,808	-8	19	795
4	Bayern Munich	Germany	3,024	-1	0	751
5	Manchester City	England	2,688	9	0	678
6	Chelsea	England	2,576	25	0	597
7	Arsenal	England	2,268	1	11	520
8	Liverpool	England	2,183	12	3	613
9	Tottenham Hotspur	England	1,624	4	4	511
10	Juventus	Italy	1,512	3	9	480
11	Paris Saint-Germain	France	1,092	12	0	646
12	Atlético Madrid	Spain	953	12	23	363
13	Borussia Dortmund	Germany	896	-1	0	379
14	Schalke 04	Germany	683	-3	12	291
15	Internazionale	Italy	672	11	50	335
16	Roma	Italy	622	1	41	298
17	West Ham United	England	616	-18	10	236
18	Milan	Italy	583	-5	42	248
19	Everton	England	476	32	0	254
20	Newcastle United	England	381	-	0	240

=== 2018 ===
As of June 2018

Rank	Team	Country	Value in millions	Debt as % of value	% change on year	Revenue ($M)
1	Manchester United	England	4,123	18	12	737
2	Real Madrid	Spain	4,088	2	14	735
3	Barcelona	Spain	4,060	1	12	706
4	Bayern Munich	Germany	3,063	0	13	640
5	Manchester City	England	2,474	0	19	575
6	Arsenal	England	2,238	12	16	531
7	Chelsea	England	2,062	0	12	466
8	Liverpool	England	1,944	5	30	462
9	Juventus	Italy	1,472	6	17	442
10	Tottenham Hotspur	England	1,237	19	17	387
11	Paris Saint-Germain	France	917	0	16	529
12	Borussia Dortmund	Germany	901	0	12	362
13	Atlético Madrid	Spain	848	3	16	297
14	West Ham United	England	754	8	19	232
15	Schalke 04	Germany	707	11	12	251
16	Roma	Italy	618	44	9	191
17	Milan	Italy	612	101	-24	213
18	Internazionale	Italy	606	58	13	285
19	Leicester City	England	500	0	21	295
20	Napoli	Italy	471	0	24	219

=== 2017 ===
As of June 2017

Rank	Team	Country	Value in millions	Debt as % of value	% change on year	Revenue ($M)
1	Manchester United	England	3,690	6	11	850
2	Barcelona	Spain	3,635	6	2	688
3	Real Madrid	Spain	3,580	3	-2	688
4	Bayern Munich	Germany	2,713	0	1	657
5	Manchester City	England	2,083	5	8	650
6	Arsenal	England	1,932	16	-4	572
7	Chelsea	England	1,845	0	11	583
8	Liverpool	England	1,492	7	-4	523
9	Juventus	Italy	1,258	7	-3	379
10	Tottenham Hotspur	England	1,058	17	4	377
11	Paris Saint-Germain	France	841	0	3	578
12	Borussia Dortmund	Germany	808	0	-3	315
13	Milan	Italy	802	73	-3	238
14	Atlético Madrid	Spain	732	9	16	234
15	West Ham United	England	634	11	17	213
16	Schalke 04	Germany	629	7	-4	249
17	Roma	Italy	569	3	-2	242
18	Internazionale	Italy	537	37	-4	199
19	Leicester City	England	413	0	-	191
20	Napoli	Italy	379	0	-4	158

=== 2016 ===
As of May 2016

Rank	Team	Country	Value ($M)	Debt as % of value	% change on year	Revenue ($M)
1	Real Madrid	Spain	3,645	3	12	694
2	Barcelona	Spain	3,549	2	12	675
3	Manchester United	England	3,317	20	7	625
4	Bayern Munich	Germany	2,678	0	14	570
5	Arsenal	England	2,017	17	54	524
6	Manchester City	England	1,921	0	40	558
7	Chelsea	England	1,661	0	21	505
8	Liverpool	England	1,548	5	58	471
9	Juventus	Italy	1,299	4	55	390
10	Tottenham Hotspur	England	1,017	2	69	310
11	Borussia Dortmund	Germany	836	0	19	338
12	Milan	Italy	825	32	6	240
13	Paris Saint-Germain	France	814	0	28	578
14	Schalke 04	Germany	655	21	15	264
15	Atlético Madrid	Spain	633	22	45	225
16	Internazionale	Italy	559	43	27	198
17	West Ham United	England	542	6	76	194
18	Roma	Italy	508	36	N/A	217
19	Napoli	Italy	396	0	12	151
20	Newcastle United	England	383	0	10	104

=== 2015 ===
As of May 2015

Rank	Team	Country	Value ($M)	Debt as % of value	% change on year	Revenue ($M)
1	Real Madrid	Spain	3,260	4	-5	746
2	Barcelona	Spain	3,160	3	-1	657
3	Manchester United	England	3,100	20	10	703
4	Bayern Munich	Germany	2,350	0	27	661
5	Manchester City	England	1,380	0	60	562
6	Chelsea	England	1,370	0	58	526
7	Arsenal	England	1,310	30	-2	487
8	Liverpool	England	982	10	39	415
9	Juventus	Italy	837	9	-2	379
10	Milan	Italy	775	44	-9	339
11	Borussia Dortmund	Germany	700	6	17	355
12	Paris Saint-Germain	France	634	0	53	643
13	Tottenham Hotspur	England	600	9	17	293
14	Schalke 04	Germany	572	0	-1	290
15	Internazionale	Italy	439	56	-9	222
16	Atlético Madrid	Spain	436	53	33	231
17	Napoli	Italy	353	0	19	224
18	Newcastle United	England	349	0	N/A	210
19	West Ham United	England	309	12	N/A	186
20	Galatasaray	Turkey	294	17	-15	220

=== 2014 ===
As of May 2014

Rank	Team	Country	Value ($M)	% change on year	Revenue ($M)
1	Real Madrid	Spain	3,440	4	675
2	Barcelona	Spain	3,200	23	627
3	Manchester United	England	2,810	-11	551
4	Bayern Munich	Germany	1,850	41	561
5	Arsenal	England	1,331	0	370
6	Chelsea	England	868	-4	394
7	Manchester City	England	863	25	411
8	Milan	Italy	856	-9	343
9	Juventus	Italy	850	22	354
10	Liverpool	England	691	8	313
11	Borussia Dortmund	Germany	599	31	333
12	Schalke 04	Germany	580	16	258
13	Tottenham Hotspur	England	514	-1	224
14	Internazionale	Italy	483	20	219
15	Paris Saint-Germain	France	415	N/A	518
16	Galatasaray	Turkey	347	N/A	204
17	Atlético Madrid	Spain	328	33	156
18	Hamburger SV	Germany	326	9	176
19	Roma	Italy	307	19	162
20	Napoli	Italy	296	-10	156

=== 2013 ===
As of April 2013

Rank	Team	Country	Value ($M)	% change on year	Revenue ($M)
1	Real Madrid	Spain	3,300	76	650
2	Manchester United	England	3,165	61	502
3	Barcelona	Spain	2,600	99	613
4	Arsenal	England	1,326	3	368
5	Bayern Munich	Germany	1,309	6	468
6	Milan	Italy	945	-4	326
7	Chelsea	England	901	18	409
8	Juventus	Italy	694	17	248
9	Manchester City	England	689	56	362
10	Liverpool	England	651	5	296
11	Tottenham Hotspur	England	520	-8	226
12	Schalke 04	Germany	498	-15	221
13	Borussia Dortmund	Germany	456	11	240
14	Internazionale	Italy	401	-18	236
15	Lyon	France	368	-4	167
16	Corinthians	Brazil	358	-	119
17	Napoli	Italy	330	17	188
18	Hamburger SV	Germany	300	-15	154
19	Marseille	France	285	-18	167
20	Newcastle United	England	263	9	146

=== 2012 ===
As of April 2012

Rank	Team	Country	Value ($M)	% change on year	Revenue ($M)
1	Manchester United	England	2,235	5	532
2	Real Madrid	Spain	1,877	34	695
3	Barcelona	Spain	1,307	34	653
4	Arsenal	England	1,292	8	364
5	Bayern Munich	Germany	1,235	12	466
6	Milan	Italy	989	18	341
7	Chelsea	England	761	16	362
8	Liverpool	England	619	12	295
9	Juventus	Italy	591	-6	223
10	Schalke 04	Germany	587	56	293
11	Tottenham Hotspur	England	564	37	262
12	Internazionale	Italy	490	11	307
13	Manchester City	England	443	52	246
14	Borussia Dortmund	Germany	394	52	197
15	Lyon	France	385	8	193
16	Hamburger SV	Germany	355	4	187
17	Roma	Italy	354	38	208
18	Marseille	France	349	26	218
19	Valencia	Spain	288	-	169
20	Napoli	Italy	283	-	167

=== 2011 ===
As of April 2011

Rank	Team	Country	Value ($M)	% change on year	Revenue ($M)
1	Manchester United	England	1,864	1	428
2	Real Madrid	Spain	1,451	10	537
3	Arsenal	England	1,192	1	336
4	Bayern Munich	Germany	1,048	6	396
5	Barcelona	Spain	975	-2	488
6	Milan	Italy	838	5	289
7	Chelsea	England	658	2	313
8	Juventus	Italy	628	-4	251
9	Liverpool	England	552	-33	276
10	Internazionale	Italy	441	7	275
11	Tottenham Hotspur	England	412	11	179
12	Schalke 04	Germany	377	-2	171
13	Lyon	France	358	8	179
14	Hamburger SV	Germany	340	3	179
15	Manchester City	England	291	13	153
16	VfB Stuttgart	Germany	281	0	141
17	Werder Bremen	Germany	279	2	147
18	Marseille	France	277	6	173
19	Atlético Madrid	Spain	275	6	153
20	Borussia Dortmund	Germany	260	-1	124

=== 2010 ===
As of April 2010

Rank	Team	Country	Value ($M)	Debt as % of value	% change on year	Revenue ($M)	Operating income ($m)
1	Manchester United	England	1,835	46	-2	459	150
2	Real Madrid	Spain	1,323	54	-2	563	130
3	Arsenal	England	1,181	41	-2	369	102
4	Barcelona	Spain	1,000	58	4	513	113
5	Bayern Munich	Germany	990	14	-11	406	61
6	Liverpool	England	822	47	-19	304	37
7	Milan	Italy	800	0	-19	276	41
8	Juventus	Italy	656	3	9	285	57
9	Chelsea	England	646	8	-19	340	-73
10	Internazionale	Italy	413	0	12	276	-14
11	Schalke 04	Germany	384	50	-25	175	-7
12	Tottenham Hotspur	England	372	29	-16	186	35
13	Lyon	France	333	10	-21	196	5
14	Hamburger SV	Germany	329	0	0	206	41
15	Roma	Italy	308	0	-19	205	25
16	Werder Bremen	Germany	274	0	-6	161	24
17	Marseille	France	262	0	9	187	19
18	Borussia Dortmund	Germany	261	32	-20	145	8
19	Manchester City	England	258	0	-17	143	-56
20	Newcastle United	England	198	8	-30	142	-49

=== 2009 ===
As of April 2009

Rank	Team	Country	Value ($M)	Debt as % of value	% change on year	Revenue ($M)	Operating income ($m)
1	Manchester United	England	1,870	54	4	512	160
2	Real Madrid	Spain	1,353	23	5	576	81
3	Arsenal	England	1,200	107	0	349	80
4	Bayern Munich	Germany	1,110	0	21	465	59
5	Liverpool	England	1,010	59	-4	332	50
6	Milan	Italy	990	0	24	330	58
7	Barcelona	Spain	960	43	22	487	108
8	Chelsea	England	800	92	5	424	-13
9	Juventus	Italy	600	5	18	264	46
10	Schalke 04	Germany	510	38	9	234	41
11	Tottenham Hotspur	England	445	29	12	228	70
12	Lyon	France	423	18	4	245	94
13	Roma	Italy	381	9	-12	276	69
14	Internazionale	Italy	370	77	-8	272	27
15	Hamburger SV	Germany	330	0	13	202	44
16	Borussia Dortmund	Germany	325	33	1	183	9
17	Manchester City	England	310	0	62	164	-16
18	Werder Bremen	Germany	292	0	12	177	27
19	Newcastle United	England	285	96	-5	198	-13
20	VfB Stuttgart	Germany	264	0	not reported	176	18
21	Aston Villa	England	240	10	26	150	1
21	Marseille	France	240	0	28	200	20
23	Celtic	Scotland	218	14	-4	145	11
24	Everton	England	207	49	5	151	14
25	Rangers	Scotland	194	86	not reported	128	15

=== 2008 ===
As of April 2008

Rank	Team	Country	Value ($M)	Debt as %of value	% change on year	Revenue ($M)	Operating income($m)
1	Manchester United	England	1,800	60	24	394	111
2	Real Madrid	Spain	1,285	27	24	474	112
3	Arsenal	England	1,200	43	31	329	77
4	Liverpool	England	1,050	65	131	269	60
5	Bayern Munich	Germany	917	0	9	302	72
6	Milan	Italy	798	0	-3	307	54
7	Barcelona	Spain	784	27	47	392	92
8	Chelsea	England	764	0	42	382	-5
9	Juventus	Italy	510	5	-10	196	35
10	Schalke 04	Germany	470	48	0	154	36
11	Roma	Italy	434	12	94	213	48
12	Tottenham Hotspur	England	414	15	70	207	64
13	Lyon	France	408	7	19	190	15
14	Internazionale	Italy	403	0	-27	207	21
15	Borussia Dortmund	Germany	323	57	63	122	31
16	Newcastle United	England	300	43	16	175	12
17	Hamburger SV	Germany	293	0	32	163	41
18	Werder Bremen	Germany	262	0	n/a	131	11
19	Valencia	Spain	254	159	31	145	-45
20	Celtic	Scotland	227	11	23	151	48
21	Everton	England	197	30	24	103	-1
22	West Ham United	England	195	23	25	115	-22
23	Manchester City	England	191	63	-8	114	27
24	Aston Villa	England	190	12	36	106	-40
25	Marseille	France	187	0	19	134	13

- Manchester United increased from $1.2 billion to $1.8 billion still remaining at top. While Real Madrid remains second due to an increase of $400 million. Arsenal also remain third after an approximate increase of $350 million.

=== 2007 ===
This is the list released in March 2007.

#	Team	Country	Value ($M)	Debt as %of value	% change on year	Revenue ($M)	Operating income($m)
1	Manchester United	England	1,453	84	6	310	92
2	Real Madrid	Spain	1,036	10	2	000	83
3	Arsenal	England	915	53	9	246	20
4	Bayern Munich	Germany	838	0	9	262	62
5	Milan	Italy	824	0	-10	305	46
6	Juventus	Italy	567	17	-18	321	45
7	Internazionale	Italy	555	n/a	10	264	26
8	Liverpool	England	537	28	6	283	-37
9	Barcelona	Spain	535	12	22	331	12
10	Schalke 04	Germany	471	53	45	157	37
11	Chelsea	England	454	18	28	225	37
12	Lyon	France	343	n/a	65	163	10
13	Newcastle United	England	260	46	-14	159	11
14	Tottenham Hotspur	England	243	0	27	137	9
15	Roma	Italy	224	0	-15	162	53
16	Hamburger SV	Germany	221	n/a	n/a	130	31
17	Manchester City	England	208	83	-6	114	9
18	Borussia Dortmund	Germany	199	126	61	114	1
19	Ajax	Netherlands	196	0	13	95	9
20	Celtic	Scotland	185	14	18	106	-8
21	Everton	England	165	32	34	107	-15
22	Marseille	France	157	n/a	n/a	105	6
23	West Ham United	England	156	27	n/a	111	6
24	Rangers	Scotland	147	7	32	113	12
25	Aston Villa	England	140	16	16	91	-21

== See also ==
- List of the most valuable football clubs in the Americas
- List of professional sports leagues by revenue
- Forbes' list of the most valuable sports teams
- Deloitte Football Money League
- Lists of stadiums
