= Mahnken =

Mahnken is a surname. Notable people with the surname include:

- Harry Mahnken (1905–1995), American football coach
- John Mahnken (1922–2000), American basketball player
