= 1943 Pittsburgh Panthers football team =

American college football season

1943 Pittsburgh Panthers football
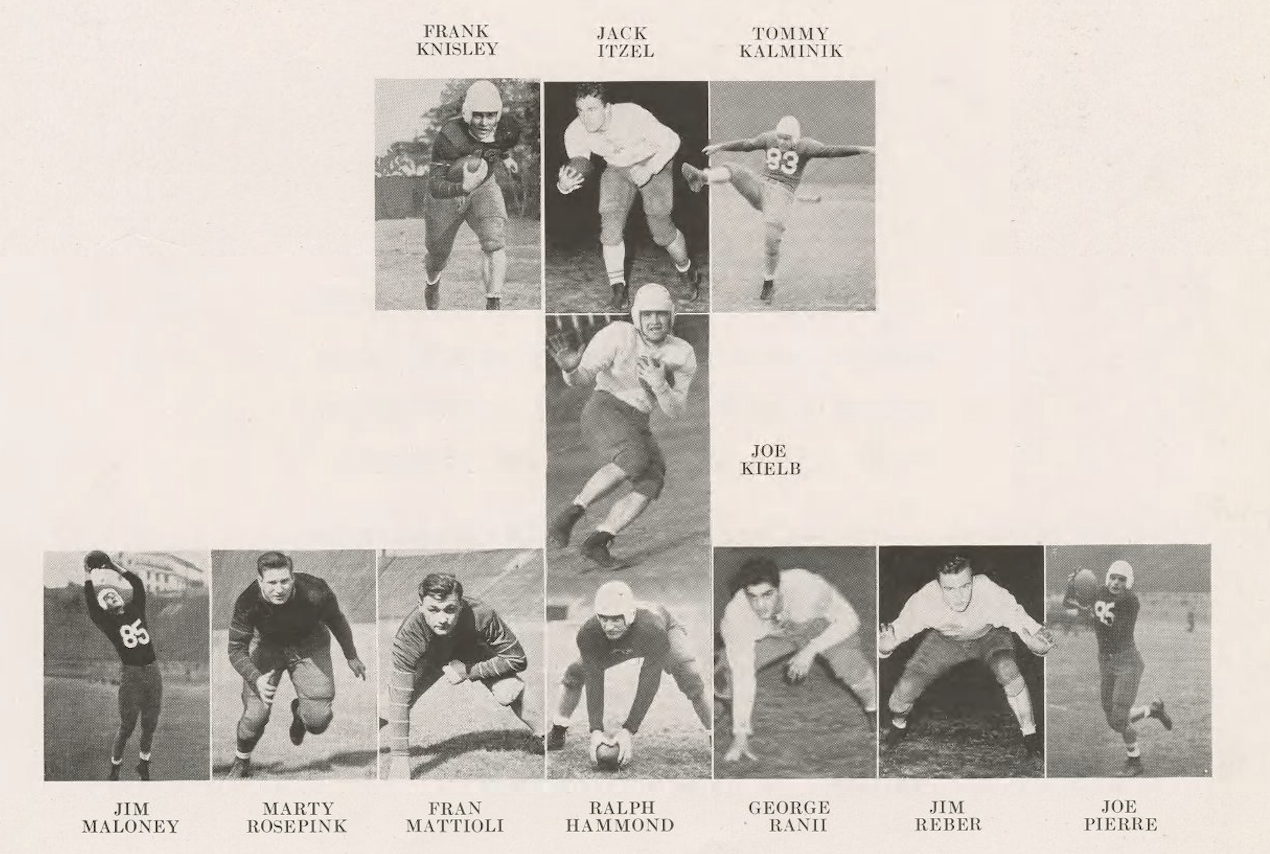
- Conference: Independent
- Record: 3–5
- Head coach: Clark Shaughnessy (1st season)
- Home stadium: Pitt Stadium

1943 Eastern college football independents records
	Conf.			Overall
Team	W	L	T	W		L		T
Boston College		–		4	–	0	–	1
Franklin & Marshall		–		7	–	1	–	0
Dartmouth		–		6	–	1	–	0
Rochester		–		6	–	1	–	0
No. 11 Army		–		7	–	2	–	1
Holy Cross		–		6	–	2	–	0
Tufts		–		6	–	2	–	0
No. 20 Penn		–		6	–	2	–	1
Brown		–		5	–	3	–	0
Villanova		–		5	–	3	–	0
Colgate		–		5	–	3	–	1
Penn State		–		5	–	3	–	1
Bucknell		–		6	–	4	–	0
Cornell		–		6	–	4	–	0
Harvard		–		2	–	2	–	1
Yale		–		4	–	5	–	0
Pittsburgh		–		3	–	5	–	0
Temple		–		2	–	6	–	0
CCNY		–		1	–	3	–	1
Princeton		–		1	–	6	–	0
Carnegie Tech		–		0	–	4	–	1
Columbia		–		0	–	8	–	0
Rankings from AP Poll

The 1943 Pittsburgh Panthers football team represented the University of Pittsburgh as an independent during the 1943 college football season. The team compiled a 3–5 record under new head coach Clark Shaughnessy.

At the start of the season, Shaughnessy introduced red and white uniforms that departed from the team's traditional blue and gold color scheme. The team reverted to blue and gold in late 1945.

In the final Litkenhous Ratings, Pittsburgh ranked 65th among the nation's college and service teams with a rating of 76.2.

== Schedule ==
Date	Opponent	Site	Result	Attendance	Source
September 25	Notre Dame	Pitt Stadium; Pittsburgh, PA (rivalry)	L 0–41	43,437–59,050	
October 2	at Great Lakes Navy	Naval Station Great Lakes; North Chicago, IL	L 0–40	22,000	
October 9	West Virginia	Pitt Stadium; Pittsburgh, PA (rivalry)	W 20–0	12,000–15,000	
October 16	at Illinois	Memorial Stadium; Champaign, IL	L 25–33	7,144	
October 23	Bethany (WV)	Pitt Stadium; Pittsburgh, PA	W 18–0	6,000	
October 30	Carnegie Tech	Pitt Stadium; Pittsburgh, PA	W 45–0	12,000	
November 6	Ohio State	Pitt Stadium; Pittsburgh, PA	L 6–46	30,000	
November 20	Penn State	Pitt Stadium; Pittsburgh, PA (rivalry)	L 0–14	12,242–20,000	

== Preseason ==
On January 22, Chester L. Smith of The Pittsburgh Press reported that Pitt head coach Charles Bowser was leaving his post, and applying for a commission in the United States Navy Pre-Flight Schools under the command of Lieutenant-Commander Tom Hamilton, who would become Pitt's Athletic Director from 1949 to 1959. On August 27, Bowser was named executive director of the USO Council in the Pittsburgh district. After the war he sold insurance for the Aetna Insurance Company in the Pittsburgh area.

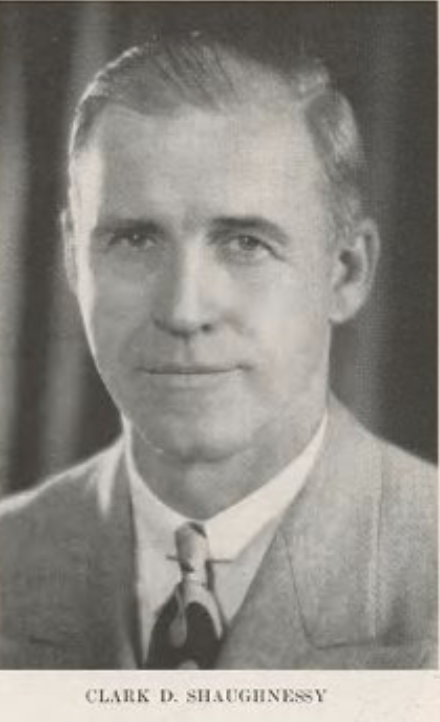
Coach Shaughnessy

On January 25, the University of Pittsburgh Board of Trustees formally approved the resignation of Charles Bowser, as Pitt football coach, and appointed Clark Shaughnessy as his successor. Athletic Director James Hagan stated: "In Shaughnessy we found a popular figure, who is liked by everyone...He has done a great teaching job wherever he has coached during the past 28 years, and gets the most out of what he has to work with...I'm convinced that Shaughnessy honestly believes in Pitt and feels he can do a good job."

On January 30, Shaughnessy hired ex-Chicago Bear guard Dr. Daniel Fortmann. He served as the assistant coach, and pursued his medical career on the staff of Presbyterian Hospital. On February 8, Shaughnessy announced that he would retain Charles “Doc” Hartwig from Bowser's coaching staff as an assistant.

In February, The Pittsburgh Press and The Pitt News reported that returning starters Jack Durishan (tackle) and Bill Dillon (guard), plus reserves Harold Scott (center), Wilbur Newstetter (guard) and John Montana (fullback) were to report for active duty the first week of March. Halfback Tony DiMatteo, along with back-up quarterbacks Bob Smith and Ed Slavin had withdrawn earlier in the year. Wilbur Newstetter and John Montana were also called to serve.

In 1943 most colleges and universities were either part of the V-12 Navy College Training Program or the Army Specialized Training Program. The Navy program allowed their students to take part in athletics at the member institutions. The Army program did not allow their students to join the athletic teams. Pitt hosted the Army Specialized Training Program on its campus.

With Pitt on the trimester system for the war effort, the spring practice drills did not start until June 28, so Shaughnessy could include all the incoming freshmen. 51 students attended the first session, and by July 3 the number had risen to 72. Practices were scheduled an hour and a half 4 days per week. Shaughnessy brought in Chicago Bear quarterback Sid Luckman to teach the T- Formation system to the Panther quarterbacks. On August 7, the Panthers ended their summer training with an intra-squad game. With several thousand fans in attendance, the Gold bested the Blue 26–16. Freshman Carl Mosso, all-state halfback from New Jersey, scored two touchdowns. Two weeks later he was summoned home by his draft board.

The student activities book was replaced by a single card that was punched upon entrance to the stadium. Most of the band members were marching with Uncle Sam, so the Army Corps band supplied the halftime music. New cheerleaders and the Panther mascot would be on the sidelines.

Coach Shaughnessy decided that the Panthers would wear red and white uniforms instead of their usual blue and gold. He told The Pittsburgh Press: "It will be the most stylish-looking team in the country. Oh, there's Stanford, too. But in equipment and color scheme and practicality our boys will lead."

== Coaching staff ==
1943 Pittsburgh Panthers football staff
Coaching staff: Clark Shaughnessy – head coach; Dr. Danny Fortmann – assistant coach; Charles Hartwig – assistant coach; John Dickinson – assistant coach; Stan Olenn – freshman coach	Support staff: James Hagan - director of athletics; Frank Carver – publicity director; Bill Rudoy – varsity student manager; Bob Marks – freshman manager

== Roster ==
1943 Pittsburgh Panthers football roster
Player	Position	Games	Weight	Class	Prep School	Hometown
William Abromitis*	fullback	4	190	freshman	Tamaqua H. S.	Tamaqua, PA
Harry Alward	tackle	1	165	freshman	Boston H. S.	Boston, PA
Al Beckman	center	1	220	freshman	Brentwood H. S.	Brentwood, PA
Robert Bock	center	1	178	freshman	Brentwood H. S.	Brentwood, PA
Jay Brown*	end	5	190	sophomore	Kiski Prep	Pittsburgh, PA
Dean Carey	halfback	1	157	freshman	Biglerville H. S.	Biglerville, PA
Angelo Carlaccini	halfback	1	165	junior	Tarentum H. S.	Tarentum, PA
Louis Chelko*	halfback	7	162	junior	Brackenridge H. S.	Brackenridge, PA
Joseph DeFrank*	tackle	7	210	freshman	McClellandtown H. S.	McClellandtown, PA
James DeLong	tackle	0	190	freshman	Reading H. S.	Reading, PA
Ken Doriot	end	0	170	junior		Pittsburgh, PA
Milton Ebert*	tackle	8	224	freshman	Erie H. S.	Erie, PA
Norman Edelman	guard	0	165	sophomore	McKeesport H. S.	McKeesport, PA
Bob Ernst	end	0	165	freshman	South Hills H. S.	Pittsburgh, PA
Gary Feniello*	guard	6	180	freshman	Connellsville H. S.	Connellsville, PA
Donald Fisher*	center	7	178	sophomore	Williamsport H. S.	Williamsport, PA
John Foley*	quarterback	4	180	freshman	Scranton H. S.	Scranton, PA
Robert Fowler*	tackle	5	190	sophomore	New Brighton H. S.	New Brighton, PA
John Fox	center	2	180	junior	Sharon H. S.	Sharon, PA
William Galand*	tackle	7	185	freshman	Dunbar H. S.	Dunbar, PA
Frank Gallo	halfback	1	146	sophomore	Vandergrift H. S.	Vandergrift, PA
Walter Germusa*	guard	4	165	freshman	Midland H. S.	Midland, PA
Samuel Grecco	guard	1	160	freshman	Butler H. S.	Butler, PA
Ralph Hammond*	center	8	194	senior	Allderdice H. S.	Pittsburgh, PA
Warren Humes	tackle	1	185	freshman		New Bethlehem, PA
John Itzel*	fullback	7	195	junior	Central Catholic H. S.	Pittsburgh, PA
Walter Jones*	halfback	5	165	junior	Dormont H. S.	Dormont, PA
Llewllyn Jordan	guard	0	190	sophomore	Scranton H. S.	Scranton, PA
Thomas Kalmanir*	halfback	7	175	freshman	Jerome H. S.	Jerome, PA
Joe Kielb*	halfback	8	170	junior	Schenley H. S.	Pittsburgh, PA
Frank Knisley*	halfback	7	187	junior	Youngstown H. S.	Youngstown, OH
George Linelli	halfback	1	165	freshman	Peabody H. S.	Pittsburgh, PA
Herbert Lurie	tackle	1	160	freshman	Allderdice H. S.	Pittsburgh, PA
John Lozar	fullback	0	170	freshman	McClellandtown H. S.	McClellandtown, PA
James McDonough	tackle	3	210	freshman	Carnegie H. S.	Carnegie, PA
Bob McLane	tackle	0	185	sophomore	Erie H. S.	Erie, PA
Clair Malarkey	end	2	179	Dental School	Bridgeville H. S.	Bridgeville, PA
George Malina	halfback	0	165	freshman	Dormont H. S.	Dormont, PA
James Maloney*	end	8	180	freshman	Central Catholic H. S.	Pittsburgh, PA
Albert Manerino	halfback	0	145	freshman	Evans City H. S.	Evans City, PA
Albert Marrongoni	tackle	3	204	senior	New Castle H. S.	New Castle, PA
Paul Massey*	end	8	170	freshman	Beaver Falls H. S.	Beaver Falls PA
Don Matthews*	halfback	8	160	sophomore	Coatesville H. S.	Coatesville, PA
Francis Mattioli*	guard	8	195	Dental School	Brackenridge H. S.	Brackenridge, PA
Joe Mocha*	quarterback	8	168	freshman	St. Clair H. S.	St. Clair, PA
Paul Oberkircher	tackle	1	180	freshman	Bedford H. S.	Bedford, PA
Donald Owen	center	2	160	freshman	Mt. Lebanon H. S.	Pittsburgh, PA
John Pager	quarterback	1	181	freshman	West Aliquippa H. S.	West Aliquippa, PA
Myron Pavuk	end	1	170	freshman	Jessup H. S.	Jessup, PA
Joe Pierre*	end	8	175	senior	Windber H. S.	Windber, PA
Paul Pioth	end	0	185	freshman	Allderdice H. S.	Pittsburgh, PA
Cyril Plazak*	quarterback	4	175	sophomore	Brackenridge H. S.	Brackenridge, PA
Steve Polach*	guard	8	165	freshman	Uniontown H. S.	Uniontown, PA
Michael Podrasky	tackle	1	185	junior	Jessup H. S.	Jessup, PA
George Ranii*	tackle	8	215	freshman	Aspinwall H.S.	Aspinwall, PA
James Reber*	end	5	190	Dental School	Allderdice H. S.	Pittsburgh, PA
Edward Reese	halfback	1	150	1freshman	Peabody H. S.	Pittsburgh, PA
Martin Rosepink*	end	4	200	senior	Verona H. S.	Verona, PA
George Saphos	halfback	1	140	freshman	Fifth Avenue H. S.	Pittsburgh, PA
Max Scherb	guard	1	190	freshman	Allderdice H. S.	Pittsburgh, PA
Robert Schneider	guard	3	185	freshman	Central Catholic H. S.	Pittsburgh, PA
Lee Schreibes	end	0	170	junior		Pittsburgh, PA
Herbert Sheinberg	tackle	1	165	freshman	Peabody H. S.	Pittsburgh, PA
Howard Simon	end	0	149	freshman	Perry H. S.	Pittsburgh, PA
Peter Siedyla	halfback	1	161	freshman	Glassport H. S.	Glassport, PA
Gerald Spector	tackle	0	218	sophomore	Allderdice H. S.	Pittsburgh, PA
Paul Steinlauf	guard	1	180	freshman	Peabody H. S.	Pittsburgh, PA
Robert Steytler	halfback	1	170	junior	Allderdice H. S.	Pittsburgh, PA
Vince Sundry	halfback	0	155	freshman	Blairsville H. S.	Blairsville, PA
Richard Trachok*	fullback	8	170	freshman	Jerome H. S.	Jerome PA
Leonard West	tackle	2	184	freshman	Atlasburg H. S.	Atlasburg, PA
Bryan Williams	tackle	0	178	senior		Pittsburgh, PA
Bill Rudoy*	student manager				graduated after the first game	
Bob Marks	freshman student manager				joined the army after first game	
Fred Piazza	student manager					
James Helman	student manager					
* Letterman						

== Game summaries ==
=== Notre Dame ===
Week 1: Notre Dame at Pitt

Team	1	2	3	4	Total
• Notre Dame	13	14	7	7	41
Pitt	0	0	0	0	0

- Date: September 25, 1943
- Location: Pitt Stadium
  Pittsburgh, PA
- Game start: 2:00 p.m.
- Game attendance: 59,050
- Game weather: cool
- Referee: R. W. Huegel (Marquette)

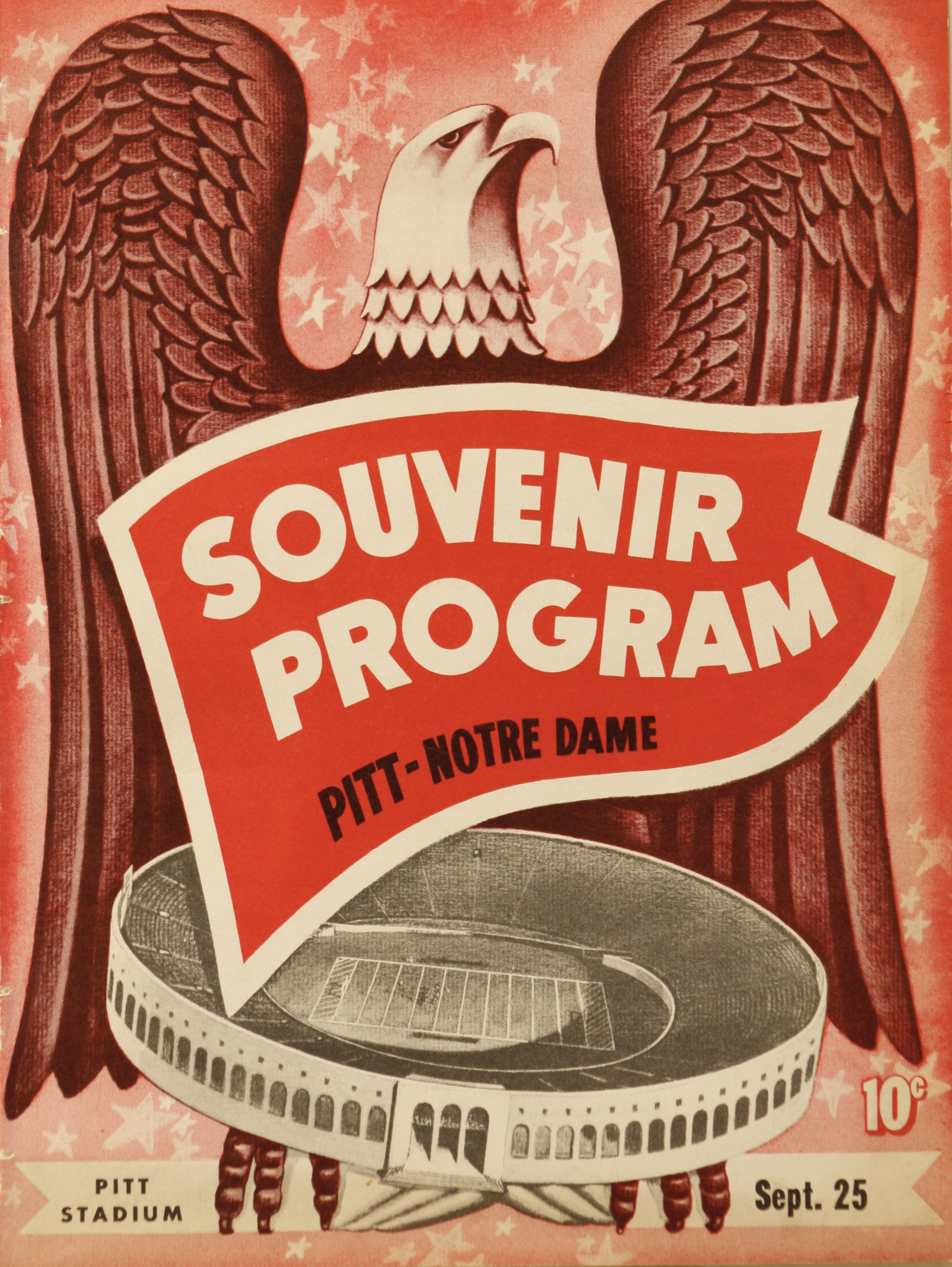
Program for September 25 game versus Notre Dame

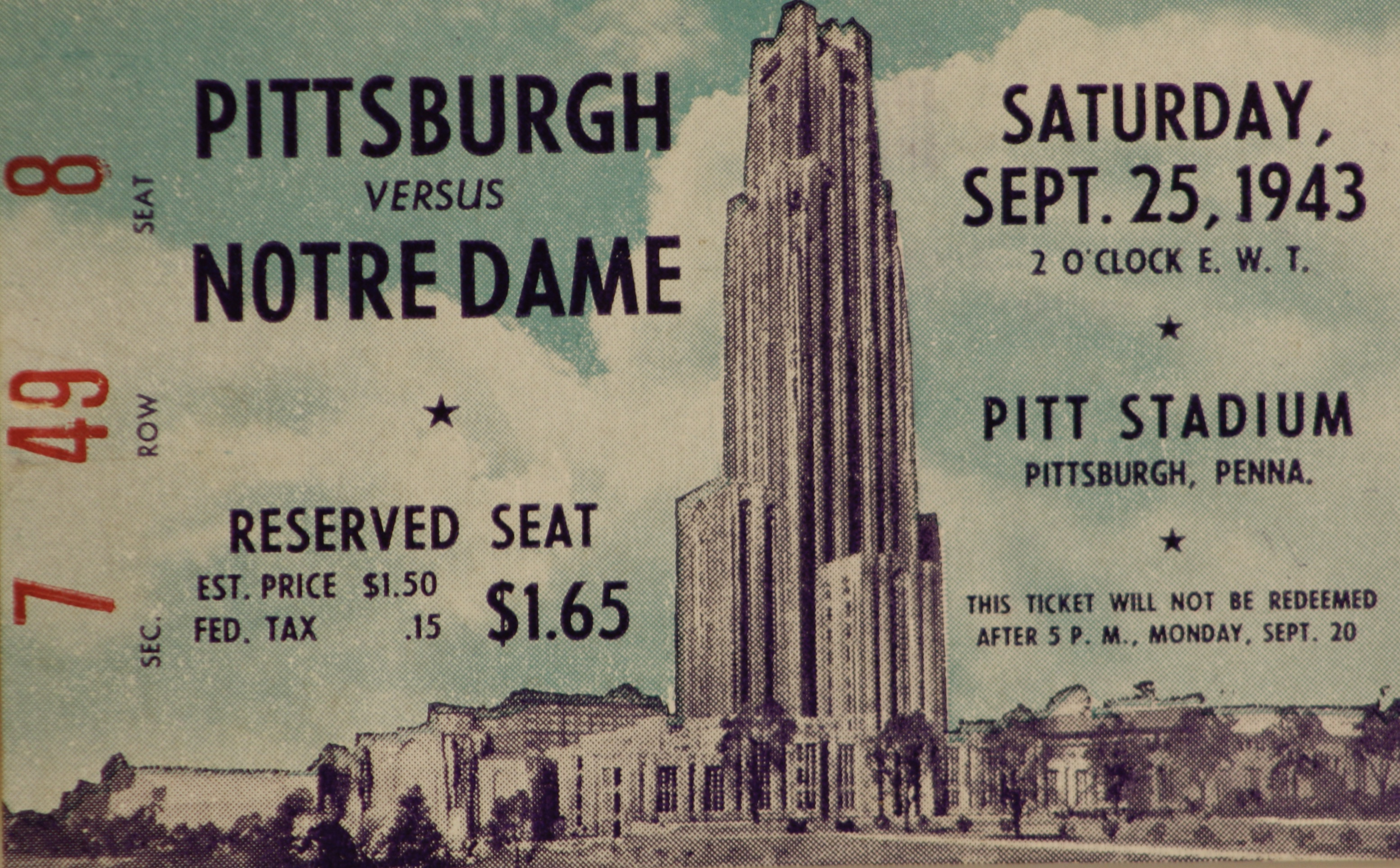
Ticket stub for September 25 game versus Notre Dame

On September 25, Pitt, wearing their red jerseys, opened the season against third-year coach Frank Leahy's Notre Dame Fighting Irish. The all-time series was tied 5–5–1, but the teams had not met since 1937, when Jock Sutherland was coach. Notre Dame had a V-12 Navy College Training Program on their campus and 29 of the 35 men on the travel squad were Navy or Marine trainees. Pitt countered with a squad of freshmen and 4-Fs.

The Irish lineup had 5 consensus 1943 All-Americans: halfback – Creighton Miller; tackle – Jim White; guard – Pat Filley; end – John Yonaker and quarterback – Angelo Bertelli, who also won the Heisman Trophy. Johnny Lujack started at quarterback ahead of Bertelli and center Herbert Coleman was named second team on the United Press All-America team.

Coach Shaughnessy was far from optimistic: "If Notre Dame doesn't beat us by at least 30 points it ought to go back home ashamed of itself." Pitt guard Francis Mattioli, tackle Martin Rosepink, center Ralph Hammond and halfback Louis Chelko were the only returning lettermen. Mattioli was named captain for the game.

In front of 59,050 fans, the largest opening day football crowd in Pittsburgh history, Notre Dame beat the Panthers handily 41–0. Jim Costin of The South Bend Tribune wrote: "The one-sided result proved conclusively what was apparent to everyone who wouldn't be blinded to the facts of life–that college teams that must depend upon players under the draft age of 18, and on 4-F's simply have no business on the same field with teams manned by naval special trainees."

Irish halfback Creighton Miller and substitute back Julius Rykovich each scored two touchdowns. Bob Palladino and Angelo Bertelli added one each. Bertelli connected on 3 of 4 placements and Fred Early made both of his attempts to reach a total of 41. Notre Dame dominated the stats as they earned 20 first downs, gained 372 yards rushing and completed 3 of 6 passes for another 30 yards. They did not throw a pass in the second half. Pitt made 6 first downs, 26 yards rushing and completed 1 of 13 passes for 19 yards.

Notre Dame finished the season ranked #1 in the AP football poll with a 9–1 record.

The Pitt starting lineup for the game against Notre Dame was Joe Pierre (left end), Milton Ebert (left tackle), Francis Mattioli (left guard), Donald Fisher (center), Gary Feniello (right guard), Martin Rosepink (right tackle), James Maloney (right end), Joseph Mocha (quarterback), Frank Knisley (left halfback), Louis Chelko (right halfback) and William Abromitis (fullback). Substitutes appearing in the game for Pitt were Paul Massey, Clair Malarkey, Michael Podrasky, Joseph DeFrank, Leonard West, George Ranii, Walter Germusa, Steve Polach, Ralph Hammond, Joseph Kielb, Richard Trachok, Thomas Kalmanir, Don Matthews, Angelo Carlaccini, and Cyril Plazak.

Scoring summary

Quarter	Time	Drive			Team	Scoring information	Score	
Quarter	Time	Plays	Yards	TOP	Team	Scoring information	Notre Dame	Pittsburgh
1		9	34		Notre Dame	Creighton Miller 4-yard touchdown run, Angelo Bertelli kick no good	0	6
1		4	65		Notre Dame	Creighton Miller 41-yard touchdown run, Angelo Bertelli kick good	0	13
2		11	67		Notre Dame	Angelo Bertelli 20-yard touchdown run, Angelo Bertelli kick good	0	20
2		2	8		Notre Dame	Bob Palladino 4-yard touchdown run, Fred Earley kick good	0	27
3		9	55		Notre Dame	Julius Rykovich 3-yard touchdown run, Angelo Bertelli kick good	0	34
4		5	70		Notre Dame	Julius Rykovich 3-yard touchdown run, Fred Earley kick good	0	41
"TOP" = time of possession. For other American football terms, see Glossary of American football.							41	0

=== at Great Lakes ===
Week 2: Pitt at Great Lakes

Team	1	2	3	4	Total
Pitt	0	0	0	0	0
• Great Lakes	13	13	0	14	40

- Date: October 2, 1943
- Location: Ross Field
  Great Lakes, IL
- Game start: 2:00 p.m.
- Game attendance: 22,000
- Game weather: cool and windy
- Referee: John Getchell (St. Thomas)

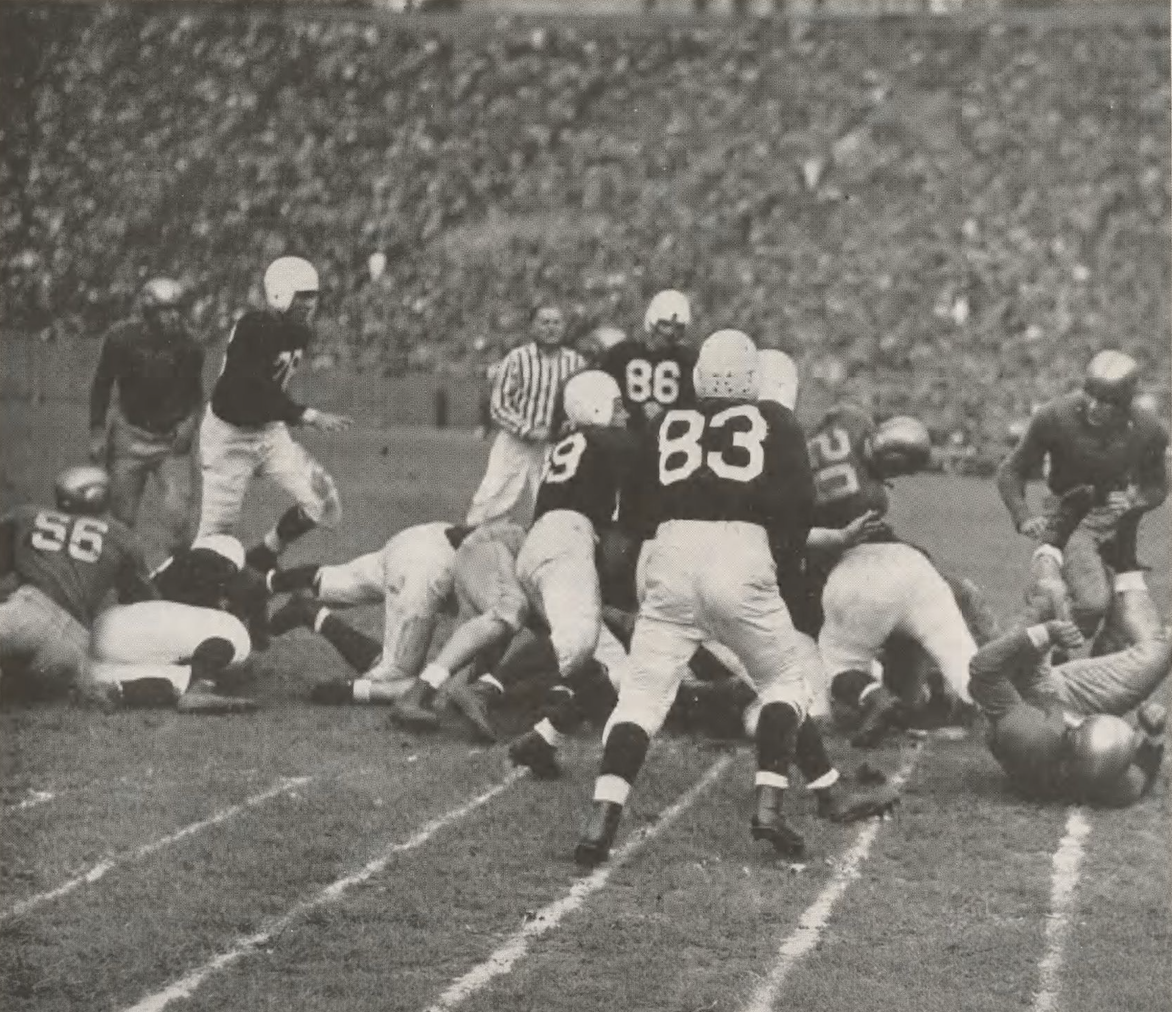
Pitt defense trying to halt Notre Dame back Julius Rykovich

On October 2, the Panthers traveled to the Great Lakes Naval Station near Lake Michigan to play the Bluejackets in front of 22,000 sailors in training. Coach Tony Hinkle's Jackets were 2–1 on the season. They had beaten Fort Riley and Iowa, and had lost to Purdue. With a backfield consisting of Steve Lach (Duke), Steve Juzwik (Notre Dame), Dewey Proctor (Furman) and Emil Sitko (Notre Dame), the Panthers were facing an All-Star team of seasoned college players.

The Bluejackets beat the Panthers 40–0. Steve Lach, who scored 2 touchdowns against the Panthers in Duke's 27–7 victory in 1941, scored 2 again to lead the Jackets. The remaining touchdowns were scored by Emil Sitko, Stan Vrabec, Ken Roskie and Art Murakowski. Joe Rogers added three placements and Frank Yokas made one. Great Lakes dominated on offense and defense. They made 16 first downs and gained 416 total yards, while holding the Panthers to 7 first downs and 121 total yards. The Panthers fumbled 7 times and threw 2 interceptions. The Bluejackets finished the season ranked #6 in the AP football poll with a 10–2 record.

The Pitt starting lineup for the game against Great Lakes was James Maloney (left end), Martin Rosepink (left tackle), Francis Mattioli (left guard), Don Fisher (center), George Ranii (right guard), Milton Ebert (right tackle), Joe Pierre (right end), Joseph Mocha (quarterback), Frank Knisley (left halfback), Louis Chelko (right halfback) and William Abromitis (fullback). Substitutes appearing in the game for Pitt were Clair Malarkey, Paul Massey, Joseph DeFrank, William Galand, Steve Polach, Gary Feniello, Ralph Hammond, Joseph Kielb, Cyril Plazak, John Itzel, Richard Trachok, Don Matthews and Thomas Kalmanir.

Scoring summary

Quarter	Time	Drive			Team	Scoring information	Score	
Quarter	Time	Plays	Yards	TOP	Team	Scoring information	Pittsburgh	Great Lakes
1		5	27		Great Lakes	Steve Lach 12-yard touchdown run, Joe Rogers kick good	0	7
1		1	65		Great Lakes	Steve Lach 65-yard touchdown run, Joe Rogers kick no good (wide)	0	13
2		7	41		Great Lakes	Emil Sitko 9-yard touchdown run, Joe Rogers kick no good (wide)	0	19
2		4	25		Great Lakes	Stan Vrabec 23-yard touchdown reception from Buist Warren, Joe Rogers kick good	0	26
4		4	18		Great Lakes	Ken Roskie 6-yard touchdown run, Joe Rogers kick good	0	33
4		5	24		Great Lakes	Art Murakowski 1-yard touchdown run, Frank Yokas kick good	0	40
"TOP" = time of possession. For other American football terms, see Glossary of American football.							0	40

=== West Virginia ===
Week 3: West Virginia at Pitt

Team	1	2	3	4	Total
West Virginia	0	0	0	0	0
• Pitt	0	6	0	14	20

- Date: October 9, 1943
- Location: Pitt Stadium
  Pittsburgh, PA
- Game start: 2:00 p.m.
- Game attendance: 12,000–15,000
- Game weather: sunny
- Referee: Thomas Timlin (Niagara)

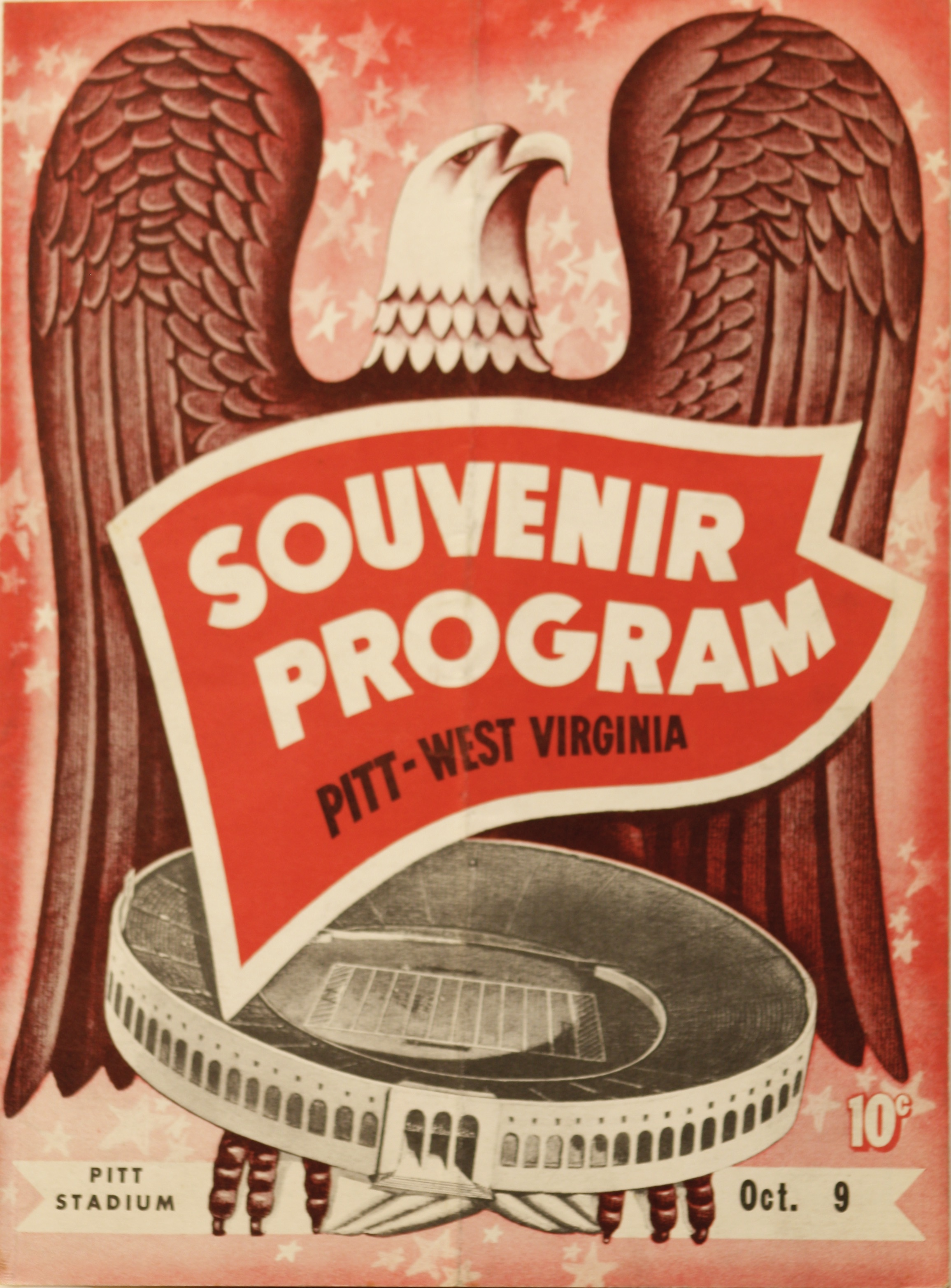
Program for October 9 game versus West Virginia

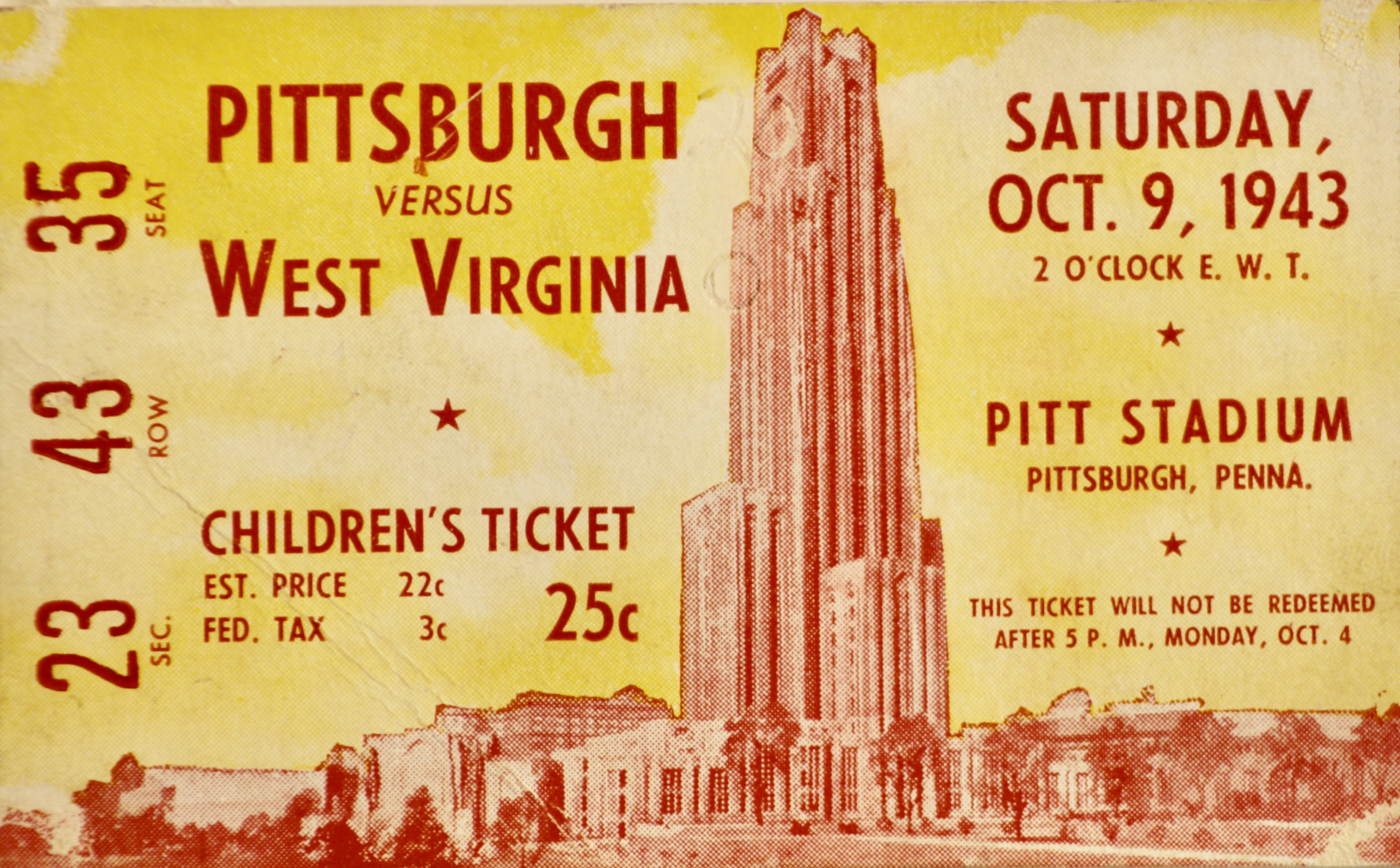
Ticket stub for October 9 game versus West Virginia

After a three-year lapse, the Backyard Brawl resumed on October 9. Pitt led the all-time series 26–8–1. Former Mountaineers coach Ira Rodgers replaced Bill Kern, who was serving in the Navy. Rodgers' Mountaineers were 0–1 on the season having lost to Virginia the previous week. Coach Rodgers was at the helm in 1928, when West Virginia last beat Pitt (9–6).

Prior to the game, the Pitt students held a pep rally. Coach Shaughnessy designated center Ralph Hammond captain for the game. Hammond named Martin Rosepink co-captain, because Rosepink was entering the Navy on Tuesday following the game. The Pitt Band was resurrected and performed at the rally and at halftime. The athletic department would sell $.25 tickets to children 12 and under for the rest of the home games.

The Panthers continued their mastery over the Mountaineers with a 20–0 shutout. Back-up quarterback Joe Kielb scored the first Panther points of the season in the second quarter on fourth down, with a 1-yard dash around the left end. The Panthers led 6–0 at halftime. After a scoreless third period, the Panthers added two more scores in the final quarter. Tom Kalmanir rushed 25-yards to cap a 6-play, 76-yard drive. Gary Feniello added the placement. The Panther offense drove 50 yards for the last score. Bill Abromitis ran the final 10 yards and Feniello added the extra point. The Panthers had the edge statistically with 15 first downs and 234 yards gained, against the Mountaineers 7 first downs and 100 yards gained. Pitt completed only 2 of 9 passes for 51 yards and had 3 intercepted. The Mountaineers completed 5 of 14 for 48 yards with 1 interception. West Virginia finished the season with a 4–3 record.

The Pitt starting lineup for the game against West Virginia was Joe Pierre (left end), Martin Rosepink (left tackle), Gary Feniello (left guard), Ralph Hammond (center), Francis Mattioli (right guard), Milton Ebert (right tackle), James Maloney (right end), Joseph Mocha (quarterback), John Itzel (left halfback), Louis Chelko (right halfback) and William Abromitis (fullback). Substitutes appearing in the game for Pitt were Paul Massey, Joseph DeFrank, Robert Fowler, Leonard West, Albert Marrangoni, William Galand, George Ranii, Walter Germusa, Steve Polach, Robert Bock, Donald Fisher, Frank Knisley, Walter Jones, Thomas Kalmanir, Joseph Kielb, Richard Trachok, Don Matthews, Cyril Plazak and Jay Brown.

Scoring summary

Quarter	Time	Drive			Team	Scoring information	Score	
Quarter	Time	Plays	Yards	TOP	Team	Scoring information	West Virginia	Pittsburgh
2		8	38		Pittsburgh	Joe Kielb 1-yard touchdown run, Gary Feniello kick no good	0	6
4		6	76		Pittsburgh	Tom Kalmanir 25-yard touchdown run, Gary Feniello kick good	0	13
4		6	50		Pittsburgh	Bill Abromitis 1-yard touchdown run, Gary Feniello kick no good	0	20
"TOP" = time of possession. For other American football terms, see Glossary of American football.							0	20

=== at Illinois ===
Week 4: Pitt at Illinois

Team	1	2	3	4	Total
Pitt	0	0	6	19	25
• Illinois	6	13	0	14	33

- Date: October 16, 1943
- Location: Memorial Stadium
  Champaign, IL
- Game start: 2:00 p.m.
- Game attendance: 7,144
- Game weather: windy and cold
- Referee: William A. Blake (Loras College)

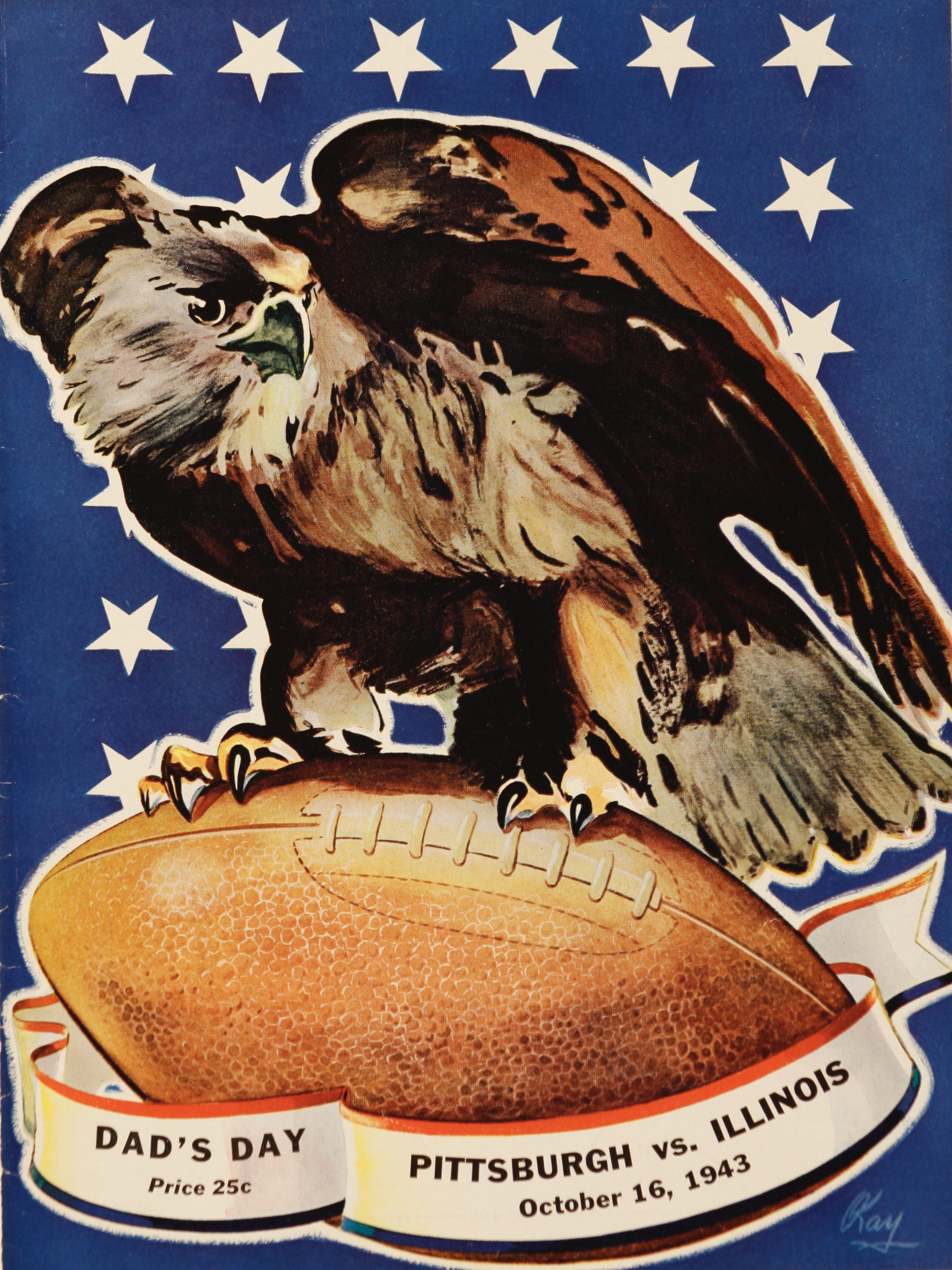
Program for October 16 game versus Illinois

On October 16, the Panthers traveled to Champaign, IL to play the Fighting Illini for the first time. Ray Eliot's Illini were 1–3 on the season. The Illini, like Pitt, were a team of 17-year-olds and 4-Fs. They lost their first three games, but earned their first victory the previous week against Wisconsin. Two starters, end James Srednicki and guard Ralph Palmer, were due to report for military service.

Coach Shaughnessy replaced Martin Rosepink with Bill Galand at left tackle. Fullback Bill Abromitis played his final game as a Panther before entering the Navy. Left end Joe Pierre, one of two remaining holdovers from last year, was designated captain for this game. The Panthers were 0–8 against the (Western) Big Ten Conference since they de-emphasized the football program, and they were the underdog in this game.

The Panthers made a game of it, but lost to the Illini 33–25. After falling behind 19–0 in the first half, the Panthers offense scored 25 second half points, but their defense surrendered 14 more points to seal their fate. Illinois drove 66 yards on the opening drive with Eddie Bray going the final 23 yards for a 6–0 lead. In the second period, Bray ended an 80-yard touchdown march with a 38-yard run. Lester Joop missed both placements. Late in the half, Eddie McGovern scored on an 11-yard run and he added the extra point for the 19–0 lead. In the third quarter, Joe Pierre recovered an Illinois fumble on the Illini 25-yard line. Four plays later, John Itzel scored from the 1-yard line. Early in the final stanza, Pitt scored again on a 5-yard touchdown scamper by Itzel to cut the margin to 19–12. The Illini answered with McGovern racing 64-yards and he added the point after to make the score 26–12. Pitt drove 62-yards for their third touchdown, a 5-yard run by Frank Knisley, to cut the lead to 26–18. Illinois answered again with a 51-yard drive. McGovern scored his third touchdown on a 14-yard dash around left end, and Dan Greenwood converted the placement. Pitt drove 69-yards with John Itzel scoring his third touchdown, and Joe Kielb added the extra point to end the scoring.

Offensively the Panthers gained 14 first downs to 11 for the Illini. Illinois gained 318 yards on the ground to 103 yards for Pitt, although the Panthers completed 14 of 17 passes for 156 yards. At one point quarterback Joe Mocha completed 9 passes in a row.

The Pitt starting lineup for the game against Illinois was Joe Pierre (left end), Milton Ebert (left tackle), Francis Mattioli (left guard), Ralph Hammond (center), Gary Feniello (right guard), William Galand (right tackle), James Maloney (right end), Joseph Mocha (quarterback), John Itzel (left halfback), Louis Chelko (right halfback), and William Abromitis (fullback). Substitutes appearing in the game for Pitt were Jay Brown, Paul Massey, James Reber, George Ranii, Gary Feniello, Robert Fowler, William Galand, Steve Polach, Joseph Kielb, Thomas Kalmanir, Don Matthews, Richard Trachok and Frank Knisley.

Scoring summary

Quarter	Time	Drive			Team	Scoring information	Score	
Quarter	Time	Plays	Yards	TOP	Team	Scoring information	Pittsburgh	Illinois
1		4	66		Illinois	Eddie Bray 23-yard touchdown run, Lester Joop kick no good	0	6
2			80		Illinois	Eddie Bray 38-yard touchdown run, Lester Joop kick no good	0	12
2		3	47		Illinois	Eddie McGovern 11-yard touchdown run, Eddie McGovern kick good	0	19
3		5	25		Pittsburgh	John Itzel 1-yard touchdown run, Gary Feniello kick no good	6	19
4		6	60		Pittsburgh	John Itzel 5-yard touchdown run, Gary Feniello kick no good	12	19
4		2	64		Illinois	Eddie McGovern 64-yard touchdown run, Eddie McGovern kick good	12	26
4		6	72		Pittsburgh	Frank Knisley 5-yard touchdown run, Gary Feniello kick no good	18	26
4		5	51		Illinois	Eddie McGovern 14-yard touchdown run, Don Greenwood kick good	18	33
4		5	69		Pittsburgh	John Itzel 8-yard touchdown run, Joe Kielb kick good	25	33
"TOP" = time of possession. For other American football terms, see Glossary of American football.							25	33

=== Bethany ===
Week 5: Bethany at Pitt

Team	1	2	3	4	Total
Bethany	0	0	0	0	0
• Pitt	0	0	6	12	18

- Date: October 23, 1943
- Location: Pitt Stadium
  Pittsburgh, PA
- Game start: 2:00 p.m.
- Game attendance: 6,000
- Game weather: cool
- Referee: John H. Coles (Westminster)

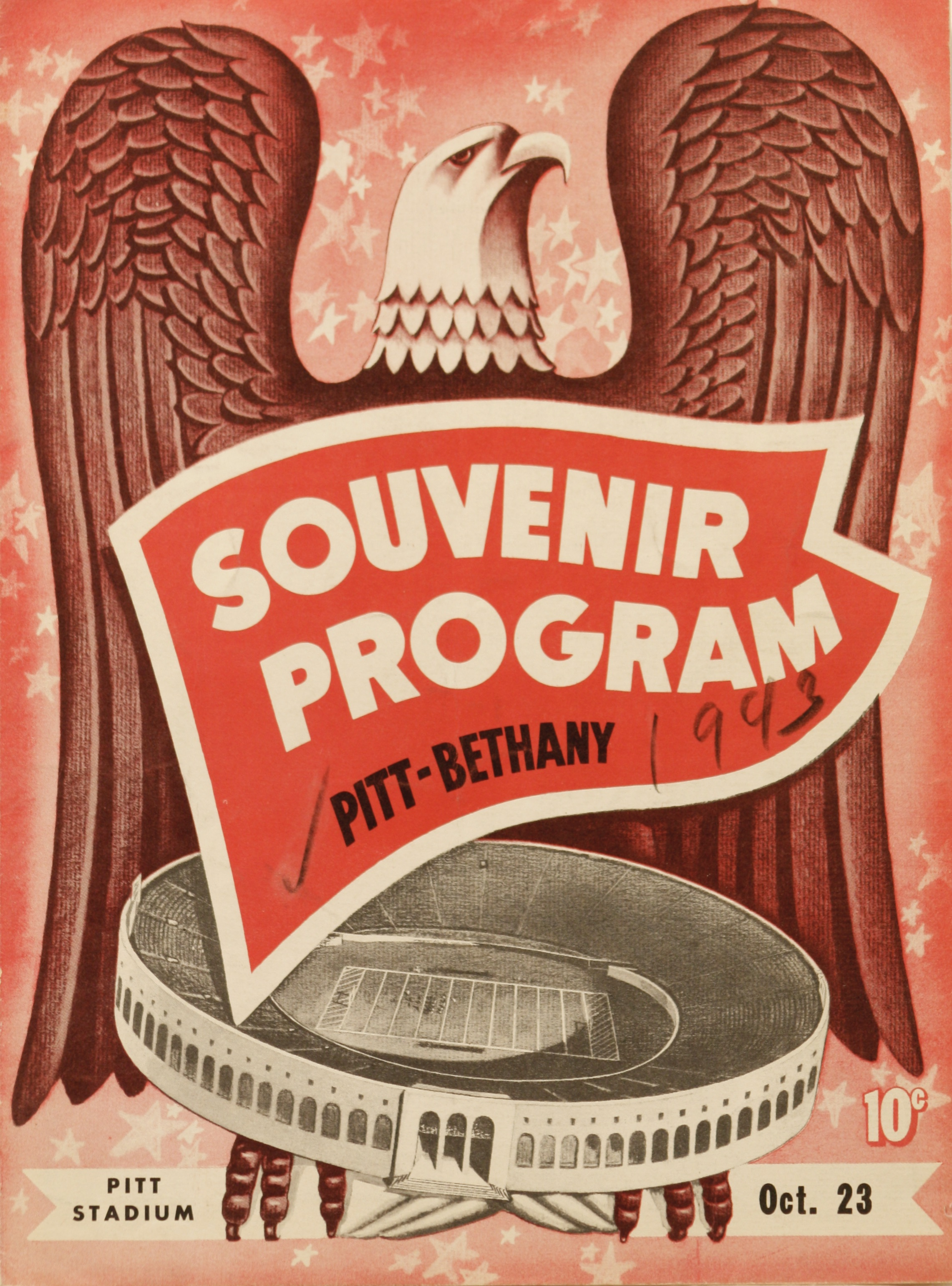
Program for October 23 Bethany game

On October 23, the Panthers welcomed the Bethany Bisons for the seventh time. Pitt had won the previous 6 meetings and had yet to surrender a point to Bethany (194–0). The Bisons had a Naval Training Program on campus, and expected to do well on the gridiron. But, John Knight's Bisons were 0–3 on the season, having lost to Miami (Ohio), Ohio Wesleyan and Oberlin.

Coach Shaughnessy replaced: Bill Abromitis with Frank Knisley at fullback; Bill Galand with James Reber at tackle; and Gary Feniello with George Ranii at guard. Halfback Louis Chelko was designated Captain for the game.

Pitt continued its mastery over the Bisons with a hard-fought 18–0 victory. The first half was scoreless. The Panthers offense received the third-quarter kick-off and moved the ball 58 yards in 19 plays. Tom Kalmanir raced 2-yards around left end for the score. Paul Massey missed the placement. Pitt scored twice in the final stanza. A 16-yard touchdown pass from Joe Mocha to Joe Pierre doubled the score to 12–0. Following the kick-off, Bethany substitute halfback, Charles Fultineer, fumbled a Ralph Hammond punt, and Joe Kielb recovered for the Panthers on the Bison 29-yard line. On second down, Tom Kalmanir ran 28 yards around left end for the final touchdown. Both of Massey's extra point attempts were blocked. Late in the game, Kalmanir returned a punt 77-yards for an apparent touchdown, but the Panthers were penalized for clipping.

The Pitt starting lineup for the game against Bethany was Joe Pierre (left end), James Reber (left tackle), Francis Mattioli (left guard), Ralph Hammond (center), George Ranii (right guard), Milton Ebert (right tackle), Paul Massey (right end), Joseph Mocha (quarterback), John Itzel (left halfback), Louis Chelko (right halfback) and Frank Knisley (fullback). Substitutes appearing in the game for Pitt were James Maloney, Jay Brown, Joseph DeFrank, Robert Fowler, William Galand, Robert Schneider, Steve Polach, Don Fisher, John Foley, Walter Jones, Joseph Kielb, Richard Trachok and Don Matthews.

Scoring summary

Quarter	Time	Drive			Team	Scoring information	Score	
Quarter	Time	Plays	Yards	TOP	Team	Scoring information	Bethany	Pittsburgh
3		19	58		Pittsburgh	Tom Kalmanir 2-yard touchdown run, Paul Massey kick no good (wide)	0	6
4			46		Pittsburgh	Joe Pierre 16-yard touchdown reception from Joe Mocha, Paul Massey kick no good (blocked)	0	12
4		2	29		Pittsburgh	Tom Kalmanir 28-yard touchdown run, Paul Massey kick no good (blocked)	0	18
"TOP" = time of possession. For other American football terms, see Glossary of American football.							0	18

=== Carnegie Tech ===
Week 6: Carnegie Tech at Pitt

Team	1	2	3	4	Total
Carnegie Tech	0	0	0	6	6
• Pitt	7	19	13	6	45

- Date: October 30, 1943
- Location: Pitt Stadium
  Pittsburgh, PA
- Game start: 2:00 p.m.
- Game attendance: 12,000
- Game weather: cool
- Referee: Yans Wallace

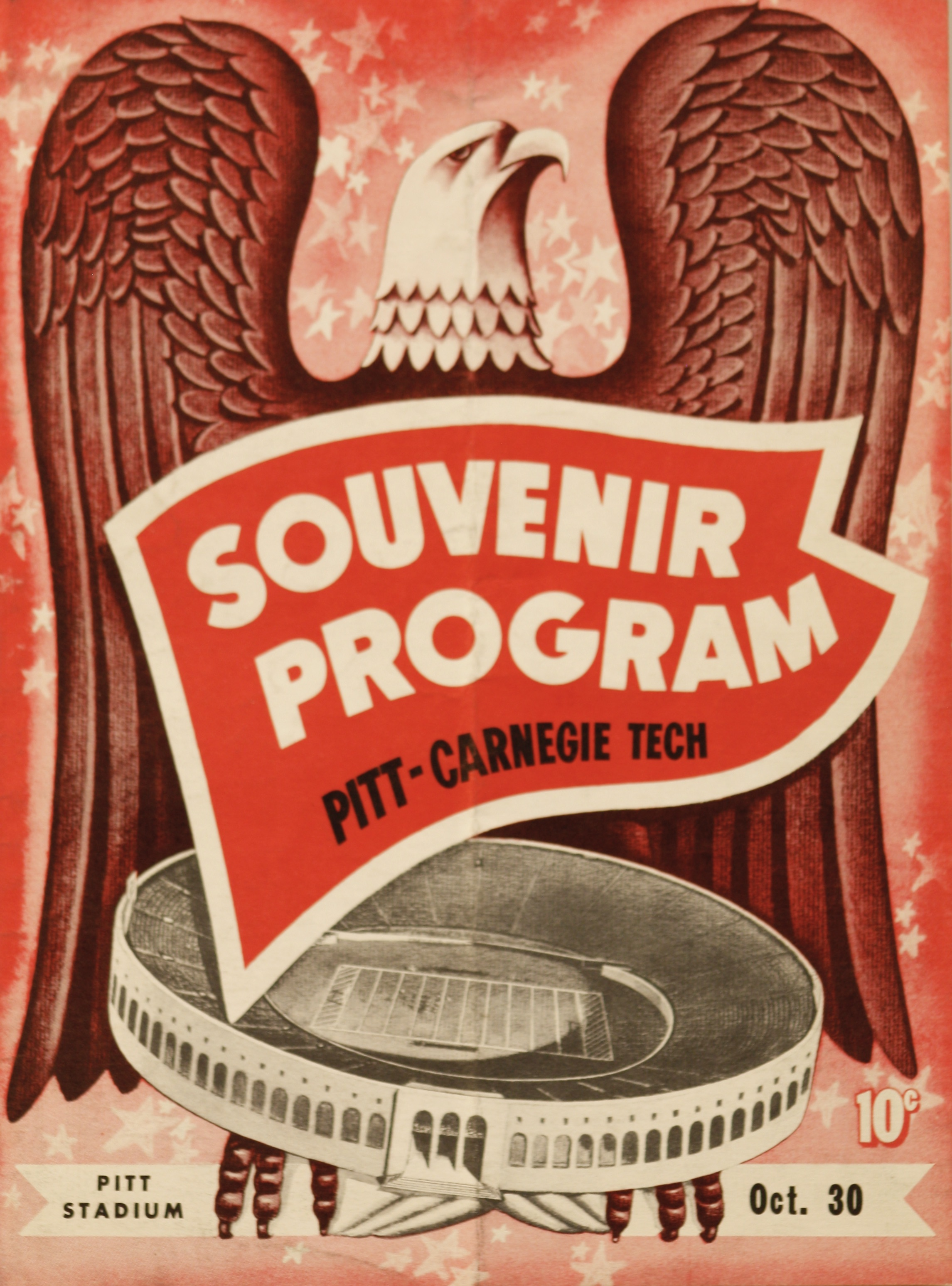
Program for October 30 game versus Carnegie tech

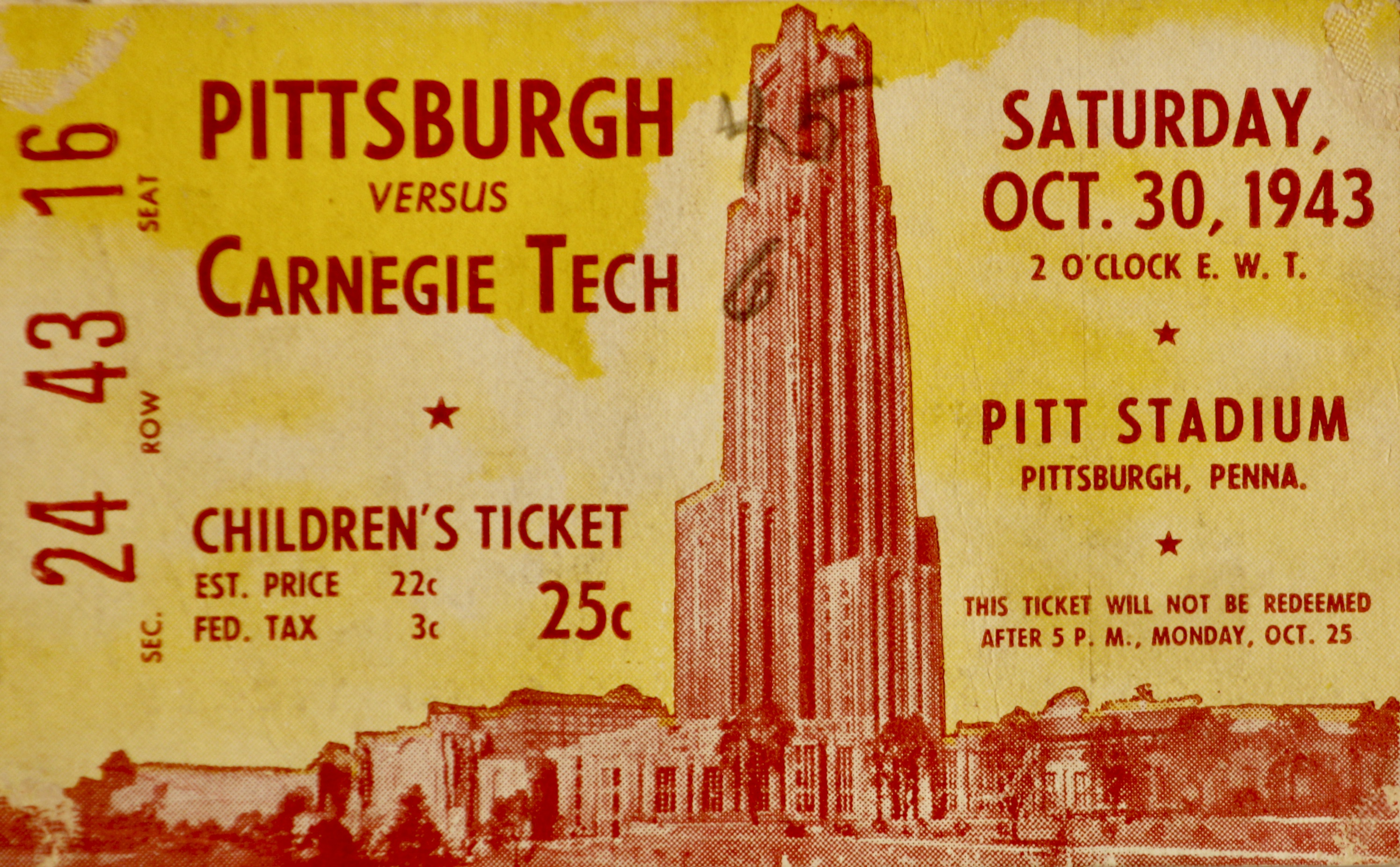
Ticket stub for October 30 game versus Carnegie Tech

On October 30, the Panthers and Tartans played the final chapter of the "City Game". Pitt led the series 23–5–1. Tech's last win was in 1938, when, in front of 61,000 fans, the Sugar Bowl bound Tartans, under the leadership of former Pitt star Bill Kern, beat the Panthers 20–10. The Tartans were now led by Joe Skladany, another former Pitt All-American. This was the final game of Tech's abbreviated war-time schedule. They were winless in their first four games. They tied Lehigh and lost to Rochester, Case and West Virginia. Due to injuries, Skladany had to replace a tackle, end, quarterback and fullback in his starting lineup.

Pitt was a heavy favorite, but Coach Shaughnessy was cautious: "There's no rhyme nor reason why Tech should beat us Saturday, but that makes me worry more than ever. I know how scraps like this can be and I don't intend to let up any between now and Saturday just because we're supposed to win." Tom Kalmanir replaced Louis Chelko at left halfback in the starting lineup and Francis Mattioli was designated Captain.

12,000 spectators watched as the Panthers beat the Tartans 45–6. This was the largest margin of victory in the 30-game series. Shaughnessy played 39 substitutes, and seven different Panthers scored touchdowns. Fullback Frank Knisley's 1-yard plunge at the end of the opening quarter started the rout. Paul Massey added the extra point. In the second period, a Joe Mocha 40-yard touchdown pass to John Itzel and Paul Massey missed extra point was followed by a 33-yard touchdown pass from Joe Kielb to Dick Trachok. Gary Feniello was good on the placement and Pitt led 20–0. Late in the quarter substitute halfback, Walter Jones, ran 59-yards and John Foley missed the extra point to raise the halftime score to 26–0. Pitt opened the third quarter with a 33-yard touchdown pass from Joe Mocha to Tom Kalmanir. Frank Knisley missed the placement. Then, Joe Kielb connected with Don Matthews on a 27-yard touchdown pass, and Matthews added the point after to bring the score to 39–0 at the end of the third quarter. The Tartans offense sustained a drive in the last period, and an Irwin Breier 37-yard touchdown pass to Al Ghizzoni gave the Tech Homecoming crowd a reason to cheer. Breier's placement was blocked. Pitt closed the scoring on a 45-yard interception return by Bob Steytler. After fumbling the snap, Steytler was stopped short on running for the extra point.

The Pitt starting lineup for the game against Carnegie Tech was Paul Massey (left end), James Reber (left tackle), Francis Mattioli (left guard), Ralph Hammond (center), George Ranii (right guard), Milton Ebert (right tackle), Joe Pierre (right end), Joseph Mocha (quarterback), John Itzel (left halfback), Thomas Kalmanir (right halfback) and Frank Knisley (fullback). Substitutes appearing in the game for Pitt were John Pager, Myron Pavuk, Donald Owen, James Maloney, Jay Brown, Paul Oberkircher, Warren Humes, Herbert Lurie, Herbert Sheinberg, Robert Fowler, James McDonough, Albert Marrangoni, William Galand, Robert Schneider, Max Scherb, Peter Siedyia, Paul Steinlauf, Joseph DeFrank, Steve Polach, Gary Feniello, Harry Alward, Al Beckman, Robert Bock, Donald Fisher, George Saphos, Edward Reese, Frank Gallo, Samuel Grecco, George Linelli, John Foley, John Fox, Walter Germusa, Robert Steytler, Dean Carey, Walter Jones, Joseph Kielb, Richard Trachok, Don Matthews and Cyril Plazak.

Scoring summary

Quarter	Time	Drive			Team	Scoring information	Score	
Quarter	Time	Plays	Yards	TOP	Team	Scoring information	Carnegie Tech	Pittsburgh
1		5	48		Pittsburgh	Frank Knisley 1-yard touchdown run, Paul Massey kick good	0	7
2		1	40		Pittsburgh	John Itzel 40-yard touchdown reception from Joe Mocha, Paul Massey kick no good	0	13
2					Pittsburgh	Dick Trachok 33-yard touchdown reception from Joe Kielb, Gary Feniello kick good	0	20
2		1	59		Pittsburgh	Walter Jones 59-yard touchdown run, John Foley kick no good	0	26
3			57		Pittsburgh	Tom Kalmanir 33-yard touchdown reception from Joe Mocha, Frank Knisley kick no good	0	32
3		1	27		Pittsburgh	Don Matthews 27-yard touchdown reception from Joe Kielb, Don Matthews kick good	0	39
4					Carnegie Tech	Al Ghizzoni 37-yard touchdown reception from Irwin Breier, Irwin Breier kick no good (blocked)	6	39
4		1	45		Pittsburgh	Interception returned 45 yards for touchdown by John Itzel, Robert Steytler kick no good (fumbled snap)	6	45
"TOP" = time of possession. For other American football terms, see Glossary of American football.							6	45

=== Ohio State ===
Week 7: Ohio State at Pitt

Team	1	2	3	4	Total
• Ohio State	25	21	0	0	46
Pitt	0	0	6	0	6

- Date: November 6, 1943
- Location: Pitt Stadium
  Pittsburgh, PA
- Game start: 2:00 p.m.
- Game attendance: 30,000
- Game weather: fair and warm
- Referee: Russell H. Rupp (Lebanon Valley)

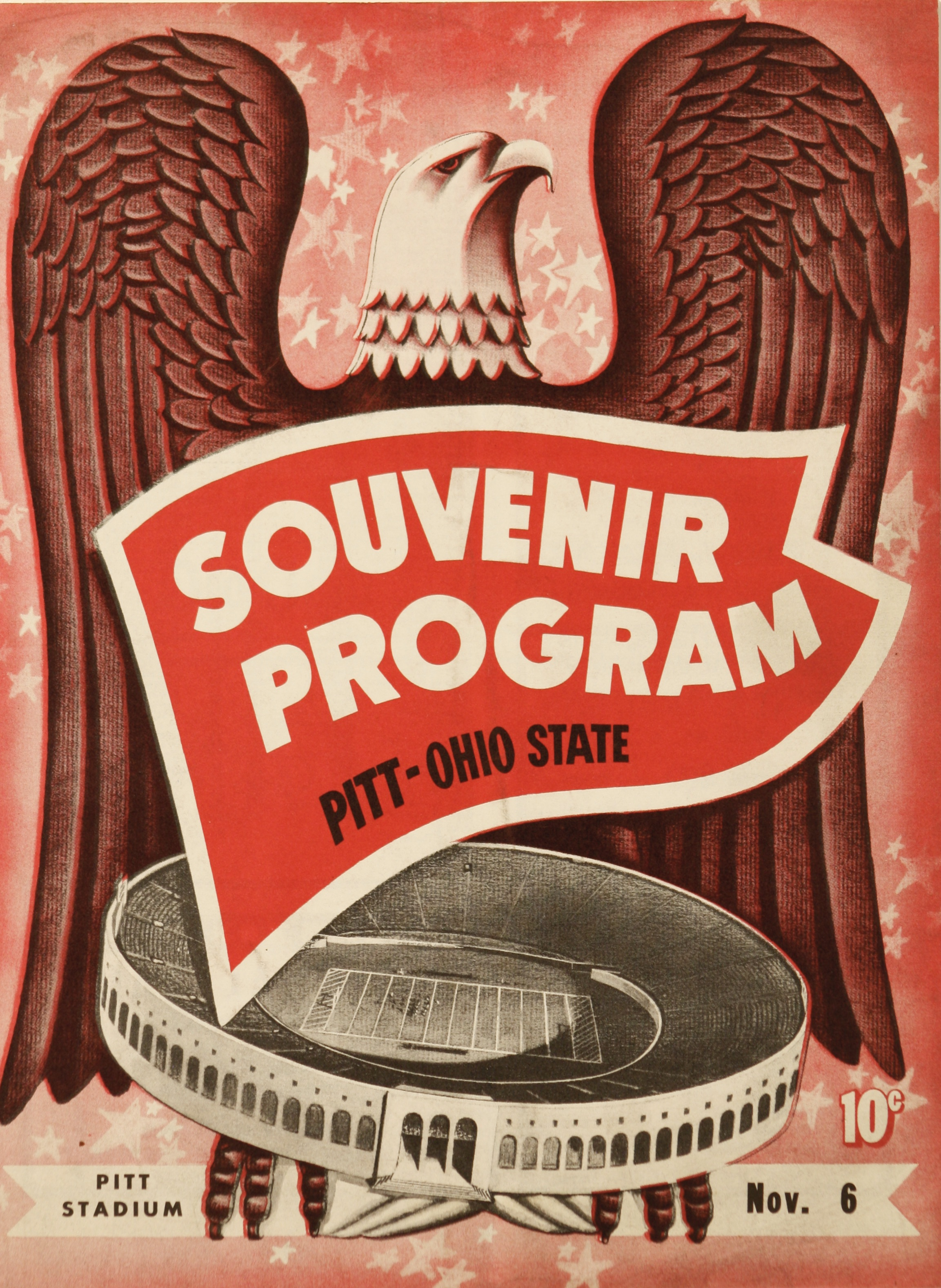
Program for November 6 game versus Ohio State

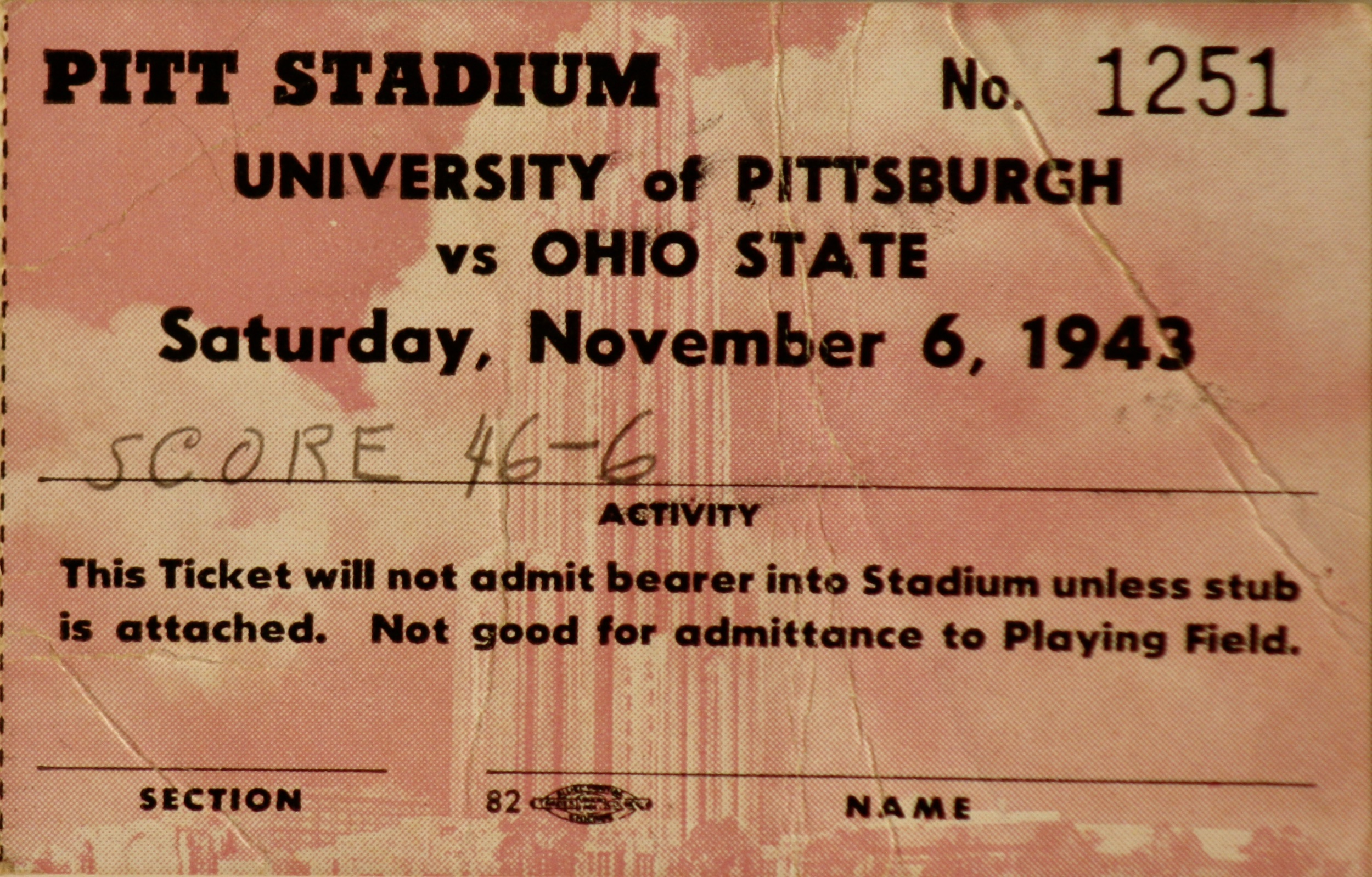
Pass for November 6 game versus Ohio State

On November 6, Coach Paul Brown's Ohio State Buckeyes were Pitt's opponent. The Buckeyes arrived in Pittsburgh with a 1–5 record. After the Carnegie Tech victory, Coach Shaughnessy was optimistic: "I'm not saying what the result of the game with Ohio State will be, but I think it will be a fine battle all the way." Shaughnessy lost 6 straight games to Ohio State when he coached Chicago and the Panthers had not beaten a Western Conference team since the football program was de-emphasized (0–9). Louis Chelko was back in the lineup at left halfback, and Ralph Hammond was the designated Captain for the two touchdown underdog Panthers.

In front of 30,000 Homecoming fans, the second-largest crowd of the season, Ohio State scored 7 unanswered touchdowns in the first half, and cruised to a 46–6 blowout victory over the Panthers. The Pitt defense could not stop the Buckeyes' first or second stringers. Mercifully, Coach Brown played his third and fourth string in the second half. Buckeye halfback, Ernie Parks, scored the first time he touched the ball on a 68-yard end sweep and the rout was on. Next, Dean Sensanbaugher scored on a 21-yard reverse before Parks added his second touchdown on a 9-yard run at the end of a 65-yard drive. Fullback, Glen Oliver, scored the next three touchdowns. Late in the half, Bob Hecker connected with Ernie Plank on a 40-yard touchdown pass. John Stungis converted 4 of 7 extra points and the Buckeyes had a 46–0 halftime lead. In the third period the Panthers managed a 5-play, 73-yard drive that ended with a John Itzel 1-yard plunge for the score. Itzel missed the placement. Ohio had 2 scoring opportunities in the second half, but the Panther defense managed to thwart both drives.

The Buckeyes finished Paul Brown's last season with a 3–6 record.

The Pitt starting lineup for the game against Ohio State was Joe Pierre (left end), Milton Ebert (left tackle), Francis Mattioli (left guard), Ralph Hammond (center), George Ranii (right guard), James Reber (right tackle), Paul Massey (right end), Joseph Kielb (quarterback), John Itzel (left halfback), Louis Chelko (right halfback) and Frank Knisley (fullback). Substitutes appearing in the game for Pitt were James Maloney, Jay Brown, Joseph DeFrank, James McDonough, William Galand, Robert Schneider, Steve Polach, Donald Fisher, Joseph Mocha, John Foley, Walter Jones, Richard Trachok, Thomas Kalmanir and Don Matthews.

Scoring summary

Quarter	Time	Drive			Team	Scoring information	Score	
Quarter	Time	Plays	Yards	TOP	Team	Scoring information	Ohio State	Pittsburgh
1		1	68		Ohio State	Ernie Parks 68-yard touchdown run, John Stungis kick no good	6	0
1		3	35		Ohio State	Dean Sensanbaugher 21-yard touchdown run, John Stungis kick no good	12	0
1		9	64		Ohio State	Ernie Parks 9-yard touchdown run, John Stungis kick good	19	0
1		5	67		Ohio State	Glen Oliver 29-yard touchdown run, John Stungis kick no good	25	0
2		5	60		Ohio State	Glen Oliver 3-yard touchdown run, John Stungis kick good	32	0
2		6	34		Ohio State	Glen Oliver 3-yard touchdown run, John Stungis kick good	39	0
2		2	45		Ohio State	Ernie Plank 40-yard touchdown reception from Bob Hecker, John Stungis kick good	46	0
3		5	73		Pittsburgh	John Itzel 1-yard touchdown run, John Itzel kick no good	46	6
"TOP" = time of possession. For other American football terms, see Glossary of American football.							46	6

=== Penn State ===
Week 8: Penn State at Pitt

Team	1	2	3	4	Total
• Penn State	7	7	0	0	14
Pitt	0	0	0	0	0

- Date: November 20, 1943
- Location: Pitt Stadium
  Pittsburgh, PA
- Game start: 2:00 p.m.
- Game attendance: 20,000
- Game weather: fair and cool
- Referee: Lt. F. H. Keating (Fitchburg State Teachers College)

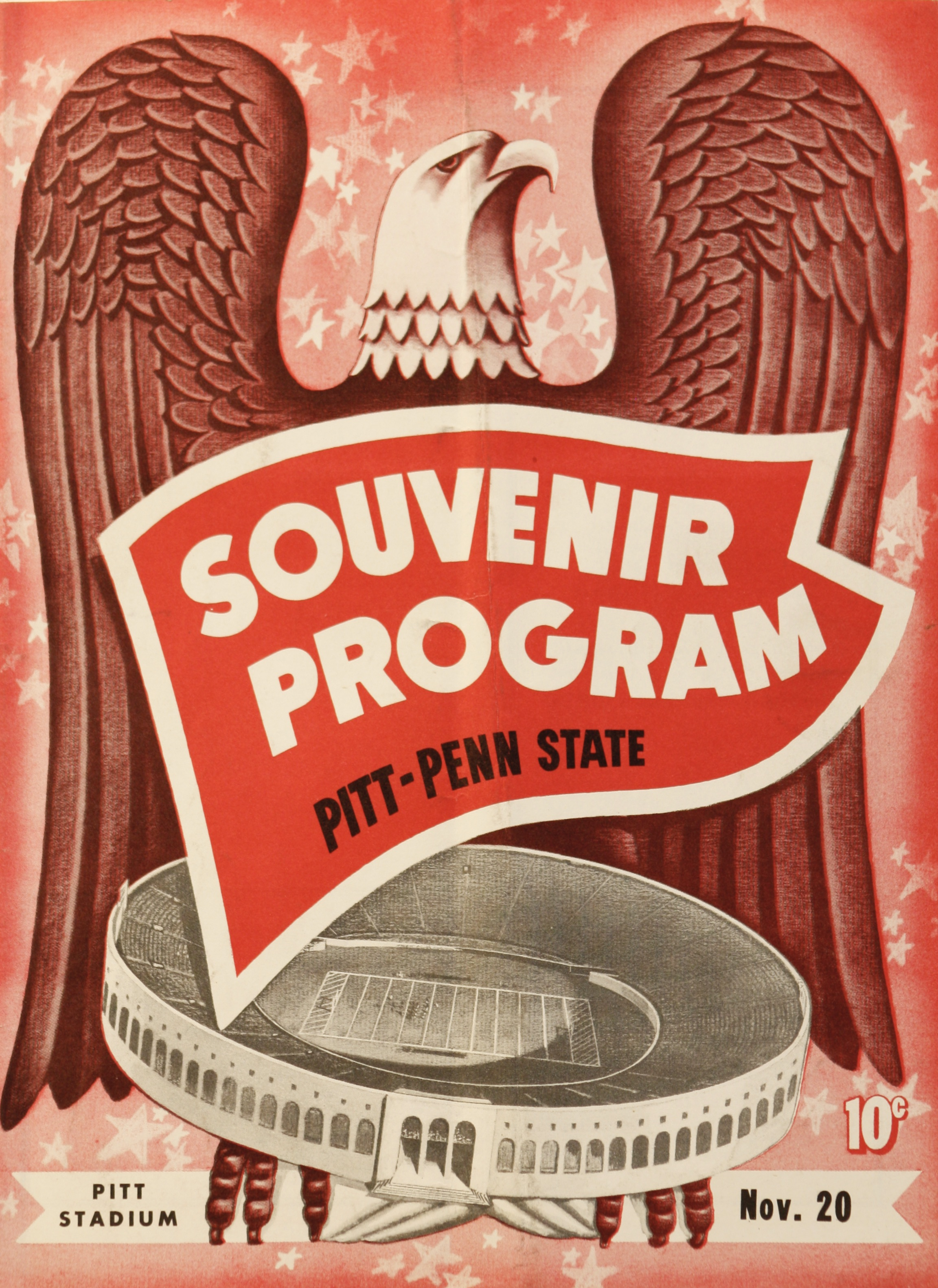
Program for November 20 game versus Penn State

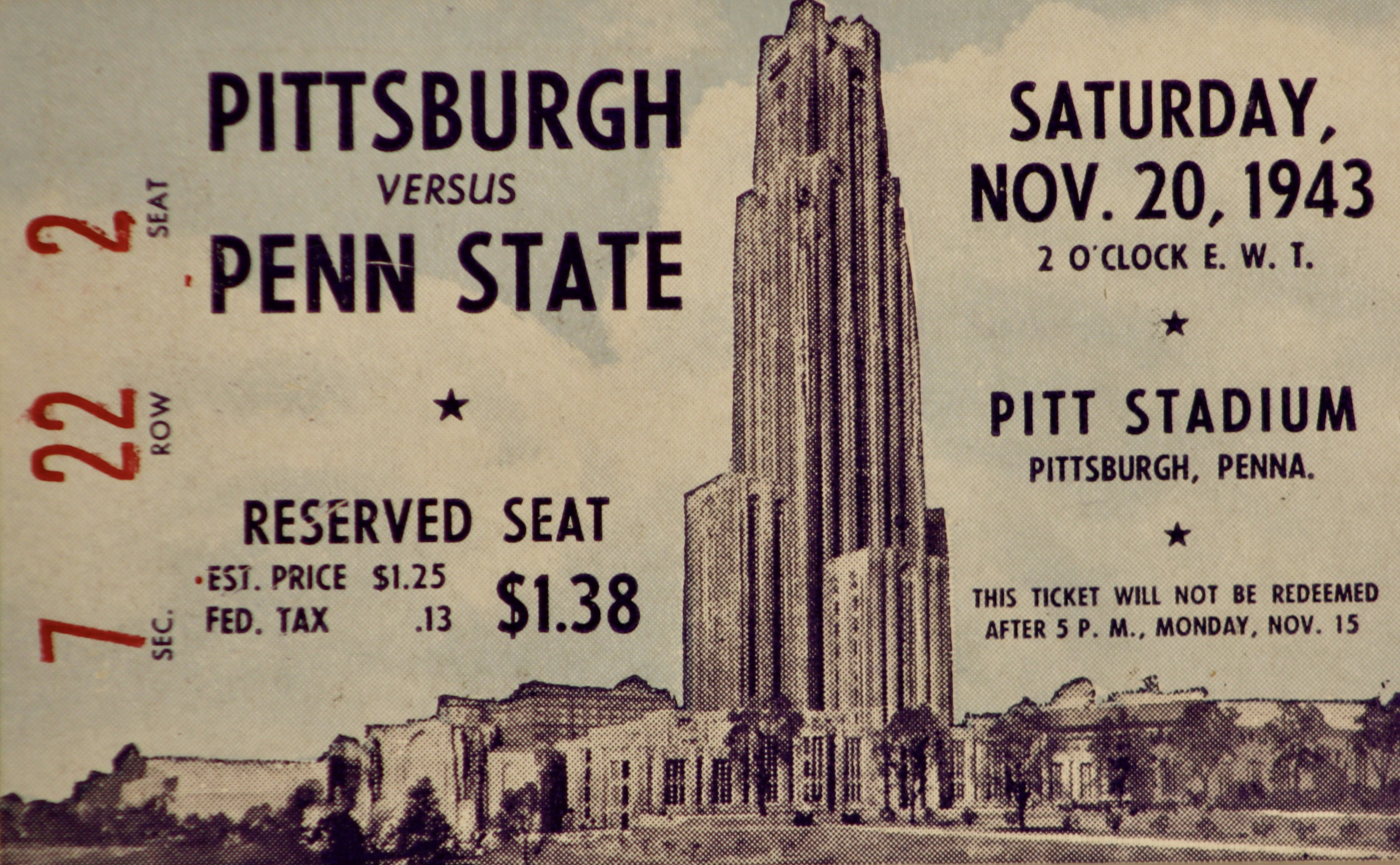
Ticket stub for November 20 game versus Penn State

The final game on the schedule of this war-time season was against Penn State. Pitt led the all-time series 24–16–2, but the Lions had won the last two games and three of the past four games. Penn State was one of two schools that had the Army, Navy and Air Force Training Programs on campus. Coach Bob Higgins had 600 trainees report for try-outs. His main problem was who would be available at game time. Oddly, Bill Abromitis was the starting halfback for the Lions. The first four weeks of the season Bill was the starting fullback for the Panthers, and then he joined the Navy. The Lions were 4–3–1 for the season.

Coach Shaughnessy had to adjust the Pitt lineup due to injuries: Jimmy McDonough replaced Milt Ebert at left tackle; Dick Trachok replaced Frank Knisley at fullback; and Walter Jones replaced Louis Chelko at right halfback. Since the Nittany Lions defense only surrendered 53 points in their 8 games, while the Panthers defense gave up 166 points in 7 games, the Panthers were two touchdown underdogs.

Penn State beat the Panthers 14–0 and for the first time in forty years, extended their win streak over Pitt to three games. Former Pitt fullback, Bill Abromitis set up the first touchdown with a 17-yard pass completion to Dick Trumbull to the 3-yard line. Then, on second down he ran the ball into the end zone. Ed Czekaj booted the point after and State led 7–0. Late in the second quarter, State gained possession on the Panther 45-yard line. A 21-yard reverse by Tubby Crawford and 10-yard run by Cass Sisler highlighted the drive to the 8-yard line. The Pitt defense stiffened and the Lions lined up for a field goal with Dick McCown holding for Ed Czekaj's attempt from the 12-yard line. It was a fake and Dick McCown raced around right end for the touchdown. Ed Czekaj added the point and State led 14–0. The second half was scoreless. Pitt was in State territory once in the third period, and again on the last play of the game. Statistically, the Panthers' offense gained minus-26 yards on the ground, and completed 4 of 18 passes for 97 yards. Penn State intercepted 2 passes and recovered 3 Pitt fumbles. Pitt ended the season with a 3–5 record. They scored 114 points and surrendered 174. Coach Shaughnessy told the Sun-Telegraph: "I'm satisfied, our boys fought their hearts out, showed they knew how to tackle and that they are better than they looked in the game with Ohio State."

Even though Bill Abromitis ended up on the Penn State team, his school of choice was Pittsburgh, so he received his football letter from Pitt.

The Pitt starting lineup for the game against Penn State was Joe Pierre (left end), James McDonough (left tackle), Francis Mattioli (left guard), Ralph Hammond (center), George Ranii (right guard), James Reber (right tackle), Paul Massey (right end), Joseph Mocha (quarterback), John Itzel (left halfback), Walter Jones (right halfback) and Richard Trachok (fullback). Substitutes appearing in the game for Pitt were James Maloney, Donald Owen, Joseph DeFrank, Albert Marrongoni, Milton Ebert, William Galand, Robert Schneider, Walter Germusa, Steve Polach, Gary Feniello, John Fox, Donald Fisher, John Foley, Joseph Kielb, Kalmanir, Louis Chelko and Don Matthews.

Scoring summary

Quarter	Time	Drive			Team	Scoring information	Score	
Quarter	Time	Plays	Yards	TOP	Team	Scoring information	Penn State	Pittsburgh
1		8	37		Penn State	Bill Abromitis 6-yard touchdown run, Ed Czekaj kick good	7	0
2		7	45		Penn State	Dick McCown 12-yard touchdown run, Ed Czekaj kick good	14	0
"TOP" = time of possession. For other American football terms, see Glossary of American football.							14	0

== Individual scoring summary ==
1943 Pittsburgh Panthers scoring summary
Player	Touchdowns	Extra points	Field goals	Safety	Points
John Itzel	5	0	0	0	30
Tom Kalmanir	4	0	0	0	24
Frank Knisley	2	0	0	0	12
Joe Kielb	1	1	0	0	7
Don Matthews	1	1	0	0	7
Richard Trachok	1	0	0	0	6
Walter Jones	1	0	0	0	6
Robert Steytler	1	0	0	0	6
Joe Pierre	1	0	0	0	6
Bill Abromitis	1	0	0	0	6
Gary Feniello	0	3	0	0	3
Paul Massey	0	1	0	0	1
Totals	18	6	0	0	114

== Postseason ==
Three Panthers were named to the Associated Press All-State football team. Third-year guard, Francis Mattioli, was named to the second team as a tackle. Two seventeen-year-old freshmen, quarterback Joe Mocha and halfback Tom Kalmanir, received honorable mention.

The Athletic Department gave letters to William Abromitis, Jay Brown, Louis Chelko, Joseph DeFrank, Milton Ebert, Gary Feniello, Don Fisher, John Foley, Robert Fowler, William Galand, Walter Germusa, Ralph Hammond, John Itzel, Walter Jones, Thomas Kalmanir, Joe Kielb, Frank Knisley, James Maloney, Paul Massey, Don Matthews, Francis Mattioli, Joe Mocha, Joe Pierre, Cyril Plazak, George Ranii, james Reber, Martin Rosepink, Rich Trachok and Bill Rudoy.
