= 1943 Princeton Tigers football team =

American college football season

1943 Princeton Tigers football
- Conference: Independent
- Record: 1–6
- Head coach: Harry Mahnken (1st season)
- Captain: Wayne Harding
- Home stadium: Palmer Stadium

1943 Eastern college football independents records
	Conf.			Overall
Team	W	L	T	W		L		T
Boston College		–		4	–	0	–	1
Franklin & Marshall		–		7	–	1	–	0
Dartmouth		–		6	–	1	–	0
Rochester		–		6	–	1	–	0
No. 11 Army		–		7	–	2	–	1
Holy Cross		–		6	–	2	–	0
Tufts		–		6	–	2	–	0
No. 20 Penn		–		6	–	2	–	1
Brown		–		5	–	3	–	0
Villanova		–		5	–	3	–	0
Colgate		–		5	–	3	–	1
Penn State		–		5	–	3	–	1
Bucknell		–		6	–	4	–	0
Cornell		–		6	–	4	–	0
Harvard		–		2	–	2	–	1
Yale		–		4	–	5	–	0
Pittsburgh		–		3	–	5	–	0
Temple		–		2	–	6	–	0
CCNY		–		1	–	3	–	1
Princeton		–		1	–	6	–	0
Carnegie Tech		–		0	–	4	–	1
Columbia		–		0	–	8	–	0
Rankings from AP Poll

The 1943 Princeton Tigers football team was an American football team that represented Princeton University as an independent during the 1943 college football season. In their first season under head coach Harry Mahnken, the Tigers compiled a 1–6 record and were outscored by a total of 226 to 96. Wayne Harding was Princeton's team captain.

In the final Litkenhous Ratings, Princeton ranked 115th among the nation's college and service teams with a rating of 61.4.

The team played its home games at Palmer Stadium in Princeton, New Jersey.

== Schedule ==
Date	Opponent	Site	Result	Attendance	Source
September 18	at Lakehurst NAS	Palmer Stadium; Princeton, NJ	W 61–12 (scrimmage)		
September 25	at Penn	Franklin Field; Philadelphia, PA (rivalry)	L 9–47	30,000	
October 2	at Columbia	Baker Field; New York, NY	W 26–7	20,000	
October 9	Cornell	Palmer Stadium; Princeton, NJ	L 0–30	12,000	
October 30	Brown	Palmer Stadium; Princeton, NJ	L 20–28	5,000	
November 6	Villanova	Palmer Stadium; Princeton, NJ	L 22–45	5,000	
November 13	at Yale	Yale Bowl; New Haven, CT (rivalry)	L 6–27	13,000	
November 20	No. 20 Dartmouth	Palmer Stadium; Princeton, NJ	L 13–42	8,000	
Rankings from AP Poll released prior to the game
