= 1943 Dartmouth Indians football team =

American college football season

1943 Dartmouth Indians football
- Conference: Independent

Ranking
- AP: No. 16
- Record: 6–1
- Head coach: Earl Brown (1st season)
- Home stadium: Memorial Field

1943 Eastern college football independents records
	Conf.			Overall
Team	W	L	T	W		L		T
Boston College		–		4	–	0	–	1
Franklin & Marshall		–		7	–	1	–	0
Dartmouth		–		6	–	1	–	0
Rochester		–		6	–	1	–	0
No. 11 Army		–		7	–	2	–	1
Holy Cross		–		6	–	2	–	0
Tufts		–		6	–	2	–	0
No. 20 Penn		–		6	–	2	–	1
Brown		–		5	–	3	–	0
Villanova		–		5	–	3	–	0
Colgate		–		5	–	3	–	1
Penn State		–		5	–	3	–	1
Bucknell		–		6	–	4	–	0
Cornell		–		6	–	4	–	0
Harvard		–		2	–	2	–	1
Yale		–		4	–	5	–	0
Pittsburgh		–		3	–	5	–	0
Temple		–		2	–	6	–	0
CCNY		–		1	–	3	–	1
Princeton		–		1	–	6	–	0
Carnegie Tech		–		0	–	4	–	1
Columbia		–		0	–	8	–	0
Rankings from AP Poll

The 1943 Dartmouth Indians football team represented Dartmouth College during the 1943 college football season.

In the final Litkenhous Ratings, Dartmouth ranked 27th among the nation's college and service teams with a rating of 92.9.

== Schedule ==
Date	Opponent	Rank	Site	Result	Attendance	Source
September 26	at Holy Cross		Fitton Field; Worcester, MA	W 3–0		
October 2	Coast Guard		Memorial Field; Hanover, MA	W 47–0		
October 9	at No. 6 Penn	No. 14	Franklin Field; Philadelphia, PA	L 6–7	45,000	
October 30	at Yale		Yale Bowl; New Haven, CT	W 20–6		
November 6	Columbia		Hanover, MA	W 47–13		
November 13	at Cornell	No. 18	Boston, MA	W 20–0		
November 20	at Princeton	No. 20	Palmer Stadium; Princeton, NJ	W 42–13	8,000	
Rankings from AP Poll released prior to the game

== Rankings ==
Ranking movements Legend: ██ Increase in ranking ██ Decrease in ranking — = Not ranked
	Week								
Poll	1	2	3	4	5	6	7	8	Final
AP	14	16	—	—	—	18	20	13	16
