= 1943 Columbia Lions football team =

American college football season

1943 Columbia Lions football
- Conference: Independent
- Record: 0–8
- Head coach: Lou Little (14th season)
- Captain: Tomas S. Rock
- Home stadium: Baker Field

1943 Eastern college football independents records
	Conf.			Overall
Team	W	L	T	W		L		T
Boston College		–		4	–	0	–	1
Franklin & Marshall		–		7	–	1	–	0
Dartmouth		–		6	–	1	–	0
Rochester		–		6	–	1	–	0
No. 11 Army		–		7	–	2	–	1
Holy Cross		–		6	–	2	–	0
Tufts		–		6	–	2	–	0
No. 20 Penn		–		6	–	2	–	1
Brown		–		5	–	3	–	0
Villanova		–		5	–	3	–	0
Colgate		–		5	–	3	–	1
Penn State		–		5	–	3	–	1
Bucknell		–		6	–	4	–	0
Cornell		–		6	–	4	–	0
Harvard		–		2	–	2	–	1
Yale		–		4	–	5	–	0
Pittsburgh		–		3	–	5	–	0
Temple		–		2	–	6	–	0
CCNY		–		1	–	3	–	1
Princeton		–		1	–	6	–	0
Carnegie Tech		–		0	–	4	–	1
Columbia		–		0	–	8	–	0
Rankings from AP Poll

The 1943 Columbia Lions football team was an American football team that represented Columbia University as an independent during the 1943 college football season.

In their 14th season under head coach Lou Little, the Lions compiled a 0–8 record, and were outscored 313 to 33 by opponents. Tomas S. Rock was the team's captain.

In the final Litkenhous Ratings, Columbia ranked 146th among the nation's college and service teams with a rating of 53.1.

Columbia played its home games at Baker Field in Upper Manhattan, in New York City.

== Schedule ==
Date	Opponent	Site	Result	Attendance	Source
October 2	Princeton	Baker Field; New York, NY	L 7–26	20,000	
October 9	Yale	Baker Field; New York, NY	L 7–20	20,000	
October 16	No. 2 Army	Baker Field; New York, NY	L 0–52	23,000	
October 23	at No. 5 Penn	Franklin Field; Philadelphia, PA	L 0–33	15,000	
October 30	at Cornell	Schoellkopf Field; Ithaca, NY (rivalry)	L 6–33	3,500	
November 6	at Dartmouth	Memorial Field; Hanover, NH	L 13–47	6,000	
November 13	No. 3 Navy	Baker Field; New York, NY	L 0–61	20,000	
November 20	Colgate	Baker Field; New York, NY	L 0–41	12,000	
Rankings from AP Poll released prior to the game
