= 1943 Harvard Crimson football team =

American college football season

1943 Harvard Crimson football
- Conference: Independent
- Record: 2–2–1
- Head coach: Henry Lamar (1st season)
- Captain: Lloyd M. Anderson
- Home stadium: Harvard Stadium

1943 Eastern college football independents records
	Conf.			Overall
Team	W	L	T	W		L		T
Boston College		–		4	–	0	–	1
Franklin & Marshall		–		7	–	1	–	0
Dartmouth		–		6	–	1	–	0
Rochester		–		6	–	1	–	0
No. 11 Army		–		7	–	2	–	1
Holy Cross		–		6	–	2	–	0
Tufts		–		6	–	2	–	0
No. 20 Penn		–		6	–	2	–	1
Brown		–		5	–	3	–	0
Villanova		–		5	–	3	–	0
Colgate		–		5	–	3	–	1
Penn State		–		5	–	3	–	1
Bucknell		–		6	–	4	–	0
Cornell		–		6	–	4	–	0
Harvard		–		2	–	2	–	1
Yale		–		4	–	5	–	0
Pittsburgh		–		3	–	5	–	0
Temple		–		2	–	6	–	0
CCNY		–		1	–	3	–	1
Princeton		–		1	–	6	–	0
Carnegie Tech		–		0	–	4	–	1
Columbia		–		0	–	8	–	0
Rankings from AP Poll

The 1943 Harvard Crimson football team was an American football team that represented Harvard University during the 1943 college football season. In its first season under head coach Henry Lamar, the team compiled a 2–2–1 record and was outscored 39-34 by opponents. Cleo O'Donnell Jr. was elected captain, but entered active duty with the United States Marine Corps before the season began. He was replaced by Lloyd M. Anderson.

For 1943, and again in 1944, rather than scheduling its usual mix of Ivy League opponents and national college football powerhouses, Harvard played a shorter schedule of smaller New England colleges and military teams. Its football record book describes these two World War II-era seasons as "informal".

In the final Litkenhous Ratings, Harvard ranked 188th among the nation's college and service teams with a rating of 41.9.

Harvard played its home games at Harvard Stadium in the Allston neighborhood of Boston, Massachusetts.

== Schedule ==
Date	Time	Opponent	Site	Result	Attendance	Source
October 2	3:00 p.m.	at Camp Edwards	Logan Field; Camp Edwards, MA	W 7–0	10,000	
October 9		WPI	Harvard Stadium; Boston, MA	L 0–13	8,000	
November 6	2:30 p.m.	Camp Edwards	Harvard Stadium; Boston, MA	W 14–7	4,500	
November 13		Tufts	Harvard Stadium; Boston, MA	L 7–13	10,000	
November 20		Boston College	Harvard Stadium; Boston, MA	T 6–6	45,000	
All times are in Eastern time
