= 1943 Villanova Wildcats football team =

American college football season

1943 Villanova Wildcats football
- Conference: Independent
- Record: 5–3
- Head coach: Jordan Olivar (1st season)
- Home stadium: Shibe Park

1943 Eastern college football independents records
| | Conf. | | | Overall |
| Team | W | L | T | W | | L | | T |
|---|---|---|---|---|---|---|---|---|
| Boston College | | – | | 4 | – | 0 | – | 1 |
| Franklin & Marshall | | – | | 7 | – | 1 | – | 0 |
| Dartmouth | | – | | 6 | – | 1 | – | 0 |
| Rochester | | – | | 6 | – | 1 | – | 0 |
| No. 11 Army | | – | | 7 | – | 2 | – | 1 |
| Holy Cross | | – | | 6 | – | 2 | – | 0 |
| Tufts | | – | | 6 | – | 2 | – | 0 |
| No. 20 Penn | | – | | 6 | – | 2 | – | 1 |
| Brown | | – | | 5 | – | 3 | – | 0 |
| Villanova | | – | | 5 | – | 3 | – | 0 |
| Colgate | | – | | 5 | – | 3 | – | 1 |
| Penn State | | – | | 5 | – | 3 | – | 1 |
| Bucknell | | – | | 6 | – | 4 | – | 0 |
| Cornell | | – | | 6 | – | 4 | – | 0 |
| Harvard | | – | | 2 | – | 2 | – | 1 |
| Yale | | – | | 4 | – | 5 | – | 0 |
| Pittsburgh | | – | | 3 | – | 5 | – | 0 |
| Temple | | – | | 2 | – | 6 | – | 0 |
| CCNY | | – | | 1 | – | 3 | – | 1 |
| Princeton | | – | | 1 | – | 6 | – | 0 |
| Carnegie Tech | | – | | 0 | – | 4 | – | 1 |
| Columbia | | – | | 0 | – | 8 | – | 0 |
Rankings from AP Poll

The 1943 Villanova Wildcats football team represented the Villanova University during the 1943 college football season. The head coach was Jordan Olivar, coaching his first season with the Wildcats. The team played their home games at Villanova Stadium in Villanova, Pennsylvania.

In the final Litkenhous Ratings, Villanova ranked 78th among the nation's college and service teams with a rating of 74.0.

== Schedule ==
| Date | Time | Opponent | Site | Result | Attendance | Source |
|---|---|---|---|---|---|---|
| September 18 | | at Muhlenberg | Allentown, PA | W 35–12 | | |
| September 25 | | at Army | Michie Stadium; West Point, NY | L 0–27 | | |
| October 10 | 2:30 p.m. | Sampson NTS | Shibe Park; Philadelphia, PA | L 7–17 | 8,000–10,000 | |
| October 16 | | Bucknell | Shibe Park; Philadelphia, PA | W 12–8 | | |
| October 24 | 8:30 p.m. | Lakehurst NAS | Shibe Park; Philadelphia, PA | W 27–14 | 5,000 | |
| November 6 | | at Princeton | Palmer Stadium; Princeton, NJ | W 45–22 | 5,000 | |
| November 14 | | at Holy Cross | Fitton Field; Worcester, MA | L 7–12 | | |
| November 20 | | at Temple | Temple Stadium; Philadelphia, PA | W 34–7 | | |
All times are in Eastern time
