= 1943 Cornell Big Red football team =

American college football season

1943 Cornell Big Red football
- Conference: Independent
- Record: 6–4
- Head coach: Carl Snavely (8th season)
- Captain: Meredith Cushing
- Home stadium: Schoellkopf Field

1943 Eastern college football independents records
	Conf.			Overall
Team	W	L	T	W		L		T
Boston College		–		4	–	0	–	1
Franklin & Marshall		–		7	–	1	–	0
Dartmouth		–		6	–	1	–	0
Rochester		–		6	–	1	–	0
No. 11 Army		–		7	–	2	–	1
Holy Cross		–		6	–	2	–	0
Tufts		–		6	–	2	–	0
No. 20 Penn		–		6	–	2	–	1
Brown		–		5	–	3	–	0
Villanova		–		5	–	3	–	0
Colgate		–		5	–	3	–	1
Penn State		–		5	–	3	–	1
Bucknell		–		6	–	4	–	0
Cornell		–		6	–	4	–	0
Harvard		–		2	–	2	–	1
Yale		–		4	–	5	–	0
Pittsburgh		–		3	–	5	–	0
Temple		–		2	–	6	–	0
CCNY		–		1	–	3	–	1
Princeton		–		1	–	6	–	0
Carnegie Tech		–		0	–	4	–	1
Columbia		–		0	–	8	–	0
Rankings from AP Poll

The 1943 Cornell Big Red football team was an American football team that represented Cornell University as an independent during the 1943 college football season. In its eighth season under head coach Carl Snavely, the team compiled a 6–4 record and outscored opponents 158–138. The team captain was Meredith "Bud" Cushing.

In the final Litkenhous Ratings, Cornell ranked 57th among the nation's college and service teams with a rating of 81.7.

Cornell played its home games at Schoellkopf Field in Ithaca, New York.

== Schedule ==
Date	Opponent	Site	Result	Attendance	Source
September 18	Bucknell	Schoellkopf Field; Ithaca, NY	W 7–6	5,000	
September 25	Sampson NTS	Schoellkopf Field; Ithaca, NY	W 27–13	6,000	
October 2	vs. Navy	Memorial Stadium; Baltimore, MD	L 7–46	32,546	
October 30	at Princeton	Palmer Stadium; Princeton, NJ	W 30–0	5,000	
October 16	Holy Cross	Schoellkopf Field; Ithaca, NY	W 20–7	5,000	
October 23	vs. Colgate	Archbold Stadium; Syracuse, NY (rivalry)	L 7–20		
October 30	Columbia	Schoellkopf Field; Ithaca, NY (rivalry)	W 33–6	3,500	
November 6	Penn State	Schoellkopf Field; Ithaca, NY	W 13–0	6,617	
November 13	vs. No. 18 Dartmouth	Fenway Park; Boston, MA (rivalry)	L 0–20	23,000	
November 25	at No. 18 Penn	Franklin Field; Philadelphia, PA (rivalry)	L 14–20	60,000	
Rankings from AP Poll released prior to the game
