= 1943 Penn State Nittany Lions football team =

American college football season

1943 Penn State Nittany Lions football
- Conference: Independent
- Record: 5–3–1
- Head coach: Bob Higgins (14th season)
- Captain: John Jaffurs
- Home stadium: New Beaver Field

1943 Eastern college football independents records
	Conf.			Overall
Team	W	L	T	W		L		T
Boston College		–		4	–	0	–	1
Franklin & Marshall		–		7	–	1	–	0
Dartmouth		–		6	–	1	–	0
Rochester		–		6	–	1	–	0
No. 11 Army		–		7	–	2	–	1
Holy Cross		–		6	–	2	–	0
Tufts		–		6	–	2	–	0
No. 20 Penn		–		6	–	2	–	1
Brown		–		5	–	3	–	0
Villanova		–		5	–	3	–	0
Colgate		–		5	–	3	–	1
Penn State		–		5	–	3	–	1
Bucknell		–		6	–	4	–	0
Cornell		–		6	–	4	–	0
Harvard		–		2	–	2	–	1
Yale		–		4	–	5	–	0
Pittsburgh		–		3	–	5	–	0
Temple		–		2	–	6	–	0
CCNY		–		1	–	3	–	1
Princeton		–		1	–	6	–	0
Carnegie Tech		–		0	–	4	–	1
Columbia		–		0	–	8	–	0
Rankings from AP Poll

The 1943 Penn State Nittany Lions football team represented the Pennsylvania State University as an independent during the 1943 college football season. The team was coached by Bob Higgins and played its home games in New Beaver Field in State College, Pennsylvania.

In the final Litkenhous Ratings, Penn State ranked 58th among the nation's college and service teams with a rating of 81.7.

== Schedule ==
Date	Opponent	Site	Result	Attendance	Source
September 25	Bucknell	New Beaver Field; State College, PA	W 14–0	6,639–10,000	
October 2	at North Carolina	Kenan Stadium; Chapel Hill, NC	L 0–19	9,983–13,500	
October 9	Colgate^{†}	New Beaver Field; State College, PA	T 0–0	6,933	
October 16	at No. 3 Navy	Thompson Stadium; Annapolis, MD	L 6–14		
October 23	at Maryland	Byrd Stadium; College Park, MD (rivalry)	W 45–0	5,000	
October 30	West Virginia	New Beaver Field; State College, PA (rivalry)	W 32–7	4,494	
November 6	at Cornell	Schoellkopf Field; Ithaca, NY	L 0–13	6,617	
November 13	Temple	New Beaver Field; State College, PA	W 13–0	4,142	
November 20	at Pittsburgh	Pitt Stadium; Pittsburgh, PA (rivalry)	W 14–0	12,242–20,000	
^{†}Homecoming; Rankings from AP Poll released prior to the game
