= 1943 Army Cadets football team =

American college football season

1943 Army Cadets football
- Conference: Independent

Ranking
- AP: No. 11
- Record: 7–2–1
- Head coach: Earl Blaik (3rd season)
- Captains: Cas Myslinski; Robin Olds
- Home stadium: Michie Stadium

1943 Eastern college football independents records
	Conf.			Overall
Team	W	L	T	W		L		T
Boston College		–		4	–	0	–	1
Franklin & Marshall		–		7	–	1	–	0
Dartmouth		–		6	–	1	–	0
Rochester		–		6	–	1	–	0
No. 11 Army		–		7	–	2	–	1
Holy Cross		–		6	–	2	–	0
Tufts		–		6	–	2	–	0
No. 20 Penn		–		6	–	2	–	1
Brown		–		5	–	3	–	0
Villanova		–		5	–	3	–	0
Colgate		–		5	–	3	–	1
Penn State		–		5	–	3	–	1
Bucknell		–		6	–	4	–	0
Cornell		–		6	–	4	–	0
Harvard		–		2	–	2	–	1
Yale		–		4	–	5	–	0
Pittsburgh		–		3	–	5	–	0
Temple		–		2	–	6	–	0
CCNY		–		1	–	3	–	1
Princeton		–		1	–	6	–	0
Carnegie Tech		–		0	–	4	–	1
Columbia		–		0	–	8	–	0
Rankings from AP Poll

The 1943 Army Cadets football team represented the United States Military Academy as an independent during the 1943 college football season. In their third year under head coach Earl Blaik, the Cadets compiled a 7–2–1 record, shut out five of their ten opponents, and outscored all opponents by a combined total of 299 to 66. In the annual Army–Navy Game, the Cadets lost to the Midshipmen by a 13 to 0 score. The Cadets also lost to Notre Dame by a 26 to 0 score, but won convincing victories over Colgate (42–0), Temple (51–0), Columbia (52–0), and Brown (59–0).

Two Army players were honored on the 1943 College Football All-America Team. Center Cas Myslinski was a consensus first-team honoree, and tackle Francis E. Merritt was selected as a first-team player by Football News and a second-team player by the Associated Press.

== Schedule ==
Date	Time	Opponent	Rank	Site	Result	Attendance	Source
September 25		Villanova		Michie Stadium; West Point, NY	W 27–0		
October 2		Colgate		Michie Stadium; West Point, NY	W 42–0		
October 9		Temple	No. 3	Michie Stadium; West Point, NY	W 51–0		
October 16		at Columbia	No. 2	Baker Field; New York, NY	W 52–0		
October 23		at Yale	No. 2	Yale Bowl; New Haven, CT	W 39–7		
October 30		at No. 6 Penn	No. 2	Franklin Field; Philadelphia, PA	T 13–13	72,000	
November 6		vs. No. 1 Notre Dame	No. 3	Yankee Stadium; Bronx, NY (rivalry)	L 0–26	75,121	
November 13	2:45 p.m.	Sampson NTS	No. 6	Michie Stadium; West Point, NY	W 16–7	8,000	
November 20		Brown	No. 7	Michie Stadium; West Point, NY	W 59–0		
November 27		No. 6 Navy	No. 7	Michie Stadium; West Point, NY (Army–Navy Game)	L 0–13		
Rankings from AP Poll released prior to the game; All times are in Eastern time

== Rankings ==
Ranking movements Legend: ██ Increase in ranking ██ Decrease in ranking ( ) = First-place votes
	Week								
Poll	1	2	3	4	5	6	7	8	Final
AP	3 (4)	2 (1)	2 (5)	2 (5)	3	6	7	7	11
