= 1943 CCNY Beavers football team =

American college football season

1943 CCNY Beavers football
- Conference: Independent
- Record: 1–3–1
- Head coach: Leo Miller (1st season)
- Home stadium: Lewisohn Stadium

1943 Eastern college football independents records
	Conf.			Overall
Team	W	L	T	W		L		T
Boston College		–		4	–	0	–	1
Franklin & Marshall		–		7	–	1	–	0
Dartmouth		–		6	–	1	–	0
Rochester		–		6	–	1	–	0
No. 11 Army		–		7	–	2	–	1
Holy Cross		–		6	–	2	–	0
Tufts		–		6	–	2	–	0
No. 20 Penn		–		6	–	2	–	1
Brown		–		5	–	3	–	0
Villanova		–		5	–	3	–	0
Colgate		–		5	–	3	–	1
Penn State		–		5	–	3	–	1
Bucknell		–		6	–	4	–	0
Cornell		–		6	–	4	–	0
Harvard		–		2	–	2	–	1
Yale		–		4	–	5	–	0
Pittsburgh		–		3	–	5	–	0
Temple		–		2	–	6	–	0
CCNY		–		1	–	3	–	1
Princeton		–		1	–	6	–	0
Carnegie Tech		–		0	–	4	–	1
Columbia		–		0	–	8	–	0
Rankings from AP Poll

The 1943 CCNY Beavers football team was an American football team that represented the City College of New York (CCNY) as an independent during the 1943 college football season. In their first season under head coach Leo Miller, the team compiled a 1–3–1 record.

In the final Litkenhous Ratings, CCNY ranked 242nd among the nation's college and service teams with a rating of 13.6.

== Schedule ==
Date	Opponent	Site	Result	Attendance	Source
October 16	at Brooklyn	Kingsmen Field; Brooklyn, NY	W 22–6	4,000	
October 23	at Swarthmore	Alumni Field; Swarthmore, PA	L 0–79	3,000	
October 30	Camp Kilmer	Lewisohn Stadium; New York, NY	L 12–13	500	
November 5	at Army Plebes	West Point, NY	T 13–13		
November 13	Brooklyn	Lewisohn Stadium; New York, NY	L 6–19	4,000	
