= 1943 Bucknell Bison football team =

American college football season

1943 Bucknell Bison football
- Conference: Independent
- Record: 6–4
- Head coach: John Sitarsky (1st season)
- Home stadium: Memorial Stadium

1943 Eastern college football independents records
| | Conf. | | | Overall |
| Team | W | L | T | W | | L | | T |
|---|---|---|---|---|---|---|---|---|
| Boston College | | – | | 4 | – | 0 | – | 1 |
| Franklin & Marshall | | – | | 7 | – | 1 | – | 0 |
| Dartmouth | | – | | 6 | – | 1 | – | 0 |
| Rochester | | – | | 6 | – | 1 | – | 0 |
| No. 11 Army | | – | | 7 | – | 2 | – | 1 |
| Holy Cross | | – | | 6 | – | 2 | – | 0 |
| Tufts | | – | | 6 | – | 2 | – | 0 |
| No. 20 Penn | | – | | 6 | – | 2 | – | 1 |
| Brown | | – | | 5 | – | 3 | – | 0 |
| Villanova | | – | | 5 | – | 3 | – | 0 |
| Colgate | | – | | 5 | – | 3 | – | 1 |
| Penn State | | – | | 5 | – | 3 | – | 1 |
| Bucknell | | – | | 6 | – | 4 | – | 0 |
| Cornell | | – | | 6 | – | 4 | – | 0 |
| Harvard | | – | | 2 | – | 2 | – | 1 |
| Yale | | – | | 4 | – | 5 | – | 0 |
| Pittsburgh | | – | | 3 | – | 5 | – | 0 |
| Temple | | – | | 2 | – | 6 | – | 0 |
| CCNY | | – | | 1 | – | 3 | – | 1 |
| Princeton | | – | | 1 | – | 6 | – | 0 |
| Carnegie Tech | | – | | 0 | – | 4 | – | 1 |
| Columbia | | – | | 0 | – | 8 | – | 0 |
Rankings from AP Poll

The 1943 Bucknell Bison football team was an American football team that represented Bucknell University as an independent during the 1943 college football season. In its first season under head coach John Sitarsky, the team compiled a 6–4 record.

In the final Litkenhous Ratings, Bucknell ranked 89th among the nation's college and service teams with a rating of 68.8.

The team played its home games at Memorial Stadium in Lewisburg, Pennsylvania.

== Schedule ==
| Date | Time | Opponent | Site | Result | Attendance | Source |
|---|---|---|---|---|---|---|
| September 18 | | at Cornell | Schoellkopf Field; Ithaca, NY | L 6–7 | 5,000 | |
| September 25 | | at Penn State | New Beaver Field; State College, PA | L 0–14 | 10,000 | |
| October 2 | | Muhlenberg | Memorial Stadium; Lewisburg, PA | W 14–6 | 3,500 | |
| October 9 | | Franklin & Marshall | Memorial Stadium; Lewisburg, PA | L 6–12 | 3,000 | |
| October 16 | | at Villanova | Shibe Park; Philadelphia, PA | L 8–12 | | |
| October 22 | | at Temple | Temple Stadium; Philadelphia, PA | W 7–6 | 5,000 | |
| October 30 | | at Muhlenberg | Allentown, PA | W 19–0 | | |
| November 6 | 2:30 p.m. | Lakehurst NAS | Memorial Stadium; Lewisburg, PA | W 13–0 | 10,000 | |
| November 13 | | Case | Memorial Stadium; Lewisburg, PA | W 19–13 | 2,000 | |
| November 25 | | at Franklin & Marshall | Williamson Field; Lancaster, PA | W 21–13 | 10,000 | |
All times are in Eastern time
