= John Sitarsky =

American athlete and coach (1912–1956)

Biographical details
- Born: February 7, 1912; Brooklyn, New York, U.S.
- Died: November 2, 1956 (aged 44); Lewisburg, Pennsylvania, U.S.

Playing career

Football
- 1933–1935: Bucknell

Baseball
- 1933–1936: Bucknell

Basketball
- 1932–1936: Bucknell
- Position: Quarterback (football)

Coaching career (HC unless noted)

Football
- 1936–1941: Bucknell (freshmen)
- 1943: Bucknell

Basketball
- 1937–1942: Bucknell (freshmen)
- 1942–1943: Bucknell

Baseball
- 1938–1943: Bucknell

Head coaching record
- Overall: 6–4 (football); 5–8 (basketball); 34–36 (baseball)

John James Sitarsky (February 7, 1912 – November 2, 1956) was an American football, basketball, and baseball player and coach. He served as the head football coach at Bucknell University in 1943. He also served as the schools head baseball coach from 1938 to 1943.

Sitarsky was the starting quarterback for the 1935 Bucknell Bison football team defeated the Miami Hurricanes in the first ever Orange Bowl.

He died of a heart attack, aged 44.

== Head coaching record ==
=== Football ===
Year	Team	Overall	Conference	Standing	Bowl/playoffs
Bucknell Bison (Independent) (1943)
1943	Bucknell	6–4			
Bucknell:		6–4			
Total:		6–4			
