= 1943 Yale Bulldogs football team =

American college football season

1943 Yale Bulldogs football
- Conference: Independent
- Record: 4–5
- Head coach: Howie Odell (2nd season)
- Captain: Townsend Hoopes
- Home stadium: Yale Bowl

1943 Eastern college football independents records
	Conf.			Overall
Team	W	L	T	W		L		T
Boston College		–		4	–	0	–	1
Franklin & Marshall		–		7	–	1	–	0
Dartmouth		–		6	–	1	–	0
Rochester		–		6	–	1	–	0
No. 11 Army		–		7	–	2	–	1
Holy Cross		–		6	–	2	–	0
Tufts		–		6	–	2	–	0
No. 20 Penn		–		6	–	2	–	1
Brown		–		5	–	3	–	0
Villanova		–		5	–	3	–	0
Colgate		–		5	–	3	–	1
Penn State		–		5	–	3	–	1
Bucknell		–		6	–	4	–	0
Cornell		–		6	–	4	–	0
Harvard		–		2	–	2	–	1
Yale		–		4	–	5	–	0
Pittsburgh		–		3	–	5	–	0
Temple		–		2	–	6	–	0
CCNY		–		1	–	3	–	1
Princeton		–		1	–	6	–	0
Carnegie Tech		–		0	–	4	–	1
Columbia		–		0	–	8	–	0
Rankings from AP Poll

The 1943 Yale Bulldogs football team represented Yale University in the 1943 college football season. The Bulldogs were led by second-year head coach Howie Odell, played their home games at the Yale Bowl and finished the season with a 4–5 record.

In the final Litkenhous Ratings, Yale ranked 86th among the nation's college and service teams with a rating of 70.3.

== Schedule ==
Date	Opponent	Site	Result	Attendance	Source
September 11	Muhlenberg	Yale Bowl; New Haven, CT	W 13–6		
September 18	Rochester	Yale Bowl; New Haven, CT	L 12–14		
September 25	Coast Guard	Yale Bowl; New Haven, CT	W 20–12		
October 2	at Penn	Franklin Field; Philadelphia, PA	L 7–41	30,000	
October 9	at Columbia	Baker Field; New York, NY	W 20–7		
October 23	No. 2 Army	Yale Bowl; New Haven, CT	L 7–39		
October 30	Dartmouth	Yale Bowl; New Haven, CT	L 6–20		
November 6	Brown	Yale Bowl; New Haven, CT	L 20–21		
November 13	Princeton	Yale Bowl; New Haven, CT (rivalry)	W 27–6	13,000	
Rankings from AP Poll released prior to the game
