= 1943 Rochester Yellowjackets football team =

American college football season

1943 Rochester Yellowjackets football
- Conference: Independent
- Record: 6–1
- Head coach: Dudley DeGroot (4th season)
- Home stadium: River Campus Stadium

1943 Eastern college football independents records
	Conf.			Overall
Team	W	L	T	W		L		T
Boston College		–		4	–	0	–	1
Franklin & Marshall		–		7	–	1	–	0
Dartmouth		–		6	–	1	–	0
Rochester		–		6	–	1	–	0
No. 11 Army		–		7	–	2	–	1
Holy Cross		–		6	–	2	–	0
Tufts		–		6	–	2	–	0
No. 20 Penn		–		6	–	2	–	1
Brown		–		5	–	3	–	0
Villanova		–		5	–	3	–	0
Colgate		–		5	–	3	–	1
Penn State		–		5	–	3	–	1
Bucknell		–		6	–	4	–	0
Cornell		–		6	–	4	–	0
Harvard		–		2	–	2	–	1
Yale		–		4	–	5	–	0
Pittsburgh		–		3	–	5	–	0
Temple		–		2	–	6	–	0
CCNY		–		1	–	3	–	1
Princeton		–		1	–	6	–	0
Carnegie Tech		–		0	–	4	–	1
Columbia		–		0	–	8	–	0
Rankings from AP Poll

The 1943 Rochester Yellowjackets football team was an American football team that represented the University of Rochester as an independent during the 1943 college football season. In their fourth and final year under head coach Dudley DeGroot, the Yellowjackets compiled a 6–1 record and were ranked at No. 75 among the nation's college and military service teams in the final 1943 Litkenhous Ratings. Rochester defeated Yale, which was ranked No. 86 by Litkenhous, and split a pair of games with Colgate, which was ranked No. 60.

The 1943 Rochester team was composed largely of Marine Corps and Navy trainees who were transferred to the school as part of the V-12 Navy College Training Program. The incoming transfers included quarterback Eddie Fox (from Syracuse), center Ray Whelan (from LSU), and tackle Steve Skapinec (from New Mexico).

The team played its home games at River Campus Stadium in Rochester, New York.

== Schedule ==
Date	Opponent	Site	Result	Attendance	Source
September 11	Baldwin–Wallace	River Campus Stadium; Rochester, NY	W 14–6	6,000	
September 18	at Yale	Yale Bowl; New Haven, CT	W 14–12	10,000	
September 25	Colgate	Rochester, NY	L 0–7	12,000	
October 2	Carnegie Tech	River Campus Stadium; Rochester, NY	W 16–0	5,000	
October 9	RPI	River Campus Stadium; Rochester, NY	W 26–0	5,000	
October 16	at Colgate	Colgate Athletic Field; Hamilton, NY	W 14–6		
October 30	Case	Rochester, NY	W 39–9		
