= 1943 Colgate Red Raiders football team =

American college football season

1943 Colgate Red Raiders football
- Conference: Independent
- Record: 5–3–1
- Head coach: Andrew Kerr (15th season)
- Captains: Michael Micka; George Thomas
- Home stadium: Colgate Athletic Field

1943 Eastern college football independents records
	Conf.			Overall
Team	W	L	T	W		L		T
Boston College		–		4	–	0	–	1
Franklin & Marshall		–		7	–	1	–	0
Dartmouth		–		6	–	1	–	0
Rochester		–		6	–	1	–	0
No. 11 Army		–		7	–	2	–	1
Holy Cross		–		6	–	2	–	0
Tufts		–		6	–	2	–	0
No. 20 Penn		–		6	–	2	–	1
Brown		–		5	–	3	–	0
Villanova		–		5	–	3	–	0
Colgate		–		5	–	3	–	1
Penn State		–		5	–	3	–	1
Bucknell		–		6	–	4	–	0
Cornell		–		6	–	4	–	0
Harvard		–		2	–	2	–	1
Yale		–		4	–	5	–	0
Pittsburgh		–		3	–	5	–	0
Temple		–		2	–	6	–	0
CCNY		–		1	–	3	–	1
Princeton		–		1	–	6	–	0
Carnegie Tech		–		0	–	4	–	1
Columbia		–		0	–	8	–	0
Rankings from AP Poll

The 1943 Colgate Red Raiders football team was an American football team that represented Colgate University as an independent during the 1943 college football season. In its 15th season under head coach Andrew Kerr, the team compiled a 5–3–1 record and outscored opponents by a total of 128 to 91. Michael Micka and George Thomas were the team captains.

In the final Litkenhous Ratings, Colgate ranked 60th among the nation's college and service teams with a rating of 79.7.

The team played its home games at Colgate Athletic Field in Hamilton, New York.

== Schedule ==
Date	Opponent	Site	Result	Attendance	Source
September 25	at Rochester	Rochester, NY	W 7–0	12,000	
October 2	at Army	Michie Stadium; West Point, NY	L 0–42	8,000	
October 9	at Penn State	New Beaver Field; State College, PA	T 0–0	12,000	
October 16	Rochester	Colgate Athletic Field; Hamilton, NY	L 6–14	5,000	
October 23	vs. Cornell	Archbold Stadium; Syracuse, NY (rivalry)	W 20–7	16,000	
October 30	at Holy Cross	Fitton Field; Worcester, MA	L 7–14	10,000	
November 13	RPI	Colgate Athletic Field; Hamilton, NY	W 26–0	1,500	
November 20	at Columbia	Baker Field; New York, NY	W 41–0	12,000	
November 25	at Brown	Brown Stadium; Providence, RI	W 21–14	10,000	
