= 1943 Penn Quakers football team =

American college football season

1943 Penn Quakers football
- Conference: Independent

Ranking
- AP: No. 20
- Record: 6–2–1
- Head coach: George Munger (6th season)
- Home stadium: Franklin Field

1943 Eastern college football independents records
	Conf.			Overall
Team	W	L	T	W		L		T
Boston College		–		4	–	0	–	1
Franklin & Marshall		–		7	–	1	–	0
Dartmouth		–		6	–	1	–	0
Rochester		–		6	–	1	–	0
No. 11 Army		–		7	–	2	–	1
Holy Cross		–		6	–	2	–	0
Tufts		–		6	–	2	–	0
No. 20 Penn		–		6	–	2	–	1
Brown		–		5	–	3	–	0
Villanova		–		5	–	3	–	0
Colgate		–		5	–	3	–	1
Penn State		–		5	–	3	–	1
Bucknell		–		6	–	4	–	0
Cornell		–		6	–	4	–	0
Harvard		–		2	–	2	–	1
Yale		–		4	–	5	–	0
Pittsburgh		–		3	–	5	–	0
Temple		–		2	–	6	–	0
CCNY		–		1	–	3	–	1
Princeton		–		1	–	6	–	0
Carnegie Tech		–		0	–	4	–	1
Columbia		–		0	–	8	–	0
Rankings from AP Poll

The 1943 Penn Quakers football team was an American football team that represented the University of Pennsylvania as an independent during the 1943 college football season. In its sixth season under head coach George Munger, the team compiled a 6–2–1 record, was ranked No. 20 in the final AP Poll, and outscored opponents by a total of 247 to 88 points.

In the final Litkenhous Ratings, Penn ranked 19th among the nation's college and service teams with a rating of 97.0.

The team played its home games at Franklin Field in Philadelphia.

== Schedule ==
Date	Time	Opponent	Rank	Site	Result	Attendance	Source
September 25		Princeton		Franklin Field; Philadelphia, PA (rivalry)	W 47–9	30,000	
October 2		Yale		Franklin Field; Philadelphia, PA	W 41–7	30,000	
October 9		No. 14 Dartmouth	No. 6	Franklin Field; Philadelphia, PA	W 7–6	45,000	
October 16	2:00 p.m.	Lakehurst NAS	No. 4	Franklin Field; Philadelphia, PA	W 74–6	25,000	
October 23		at Columbia	No. 5	New York, NY	W 33–0	15,000	
October 30		No. 2 Army	No. 6	Franklin Field; Philadelphia, PA	T 13–13	72,000	
November 6		No. 7 Navy	No. 5	Franklin Field; Philadelphia, PA	L 7–24	73,000	
November 13		North Carolina	No. 10	Franklin Field; Philadelphia, PA	L 6–9	30,000	
November 25		Cornell	No. T–18	Franklin Field; Philadelphia, PA (rivalry)	W 20–14	60,000	
Rankings from AP Poll released prior to the game; All times are in Eastern time

== Rankings ==
Ranking movements Legend: ██ Increase in ranking ██ Decrease in ranking т = Tied with team above or below ( ) = First-place votes
	Week								
Poll	1	2	3	4	5	6	7	8	Final
AP	6 (1)	4 (1)	5 (4)	6	5 (2)	10	19	18т	20
