= Leo Miller (American football) =

American football and lacrosse coach (1895–1961)

Biographical details
- Born: 1895; Cherokee, North Carolina, U.S.
- Died: 1961 (aged 65–66)

Playing career

Football
- 1911–1913: Carlisle

Coaching career (HC unless noted)

Football
- 1932–1933: CCNY (assistant)
- 1943: CCNY

Lacrosse
- 1932–1960: CCNY

Leon A. "Chief" Miller (1895–1961) was an American football and lacrosse coach. He served as the head football coach at the City College of New York (CCNY) in 1943. He also served as the CCNY's head men's lacrosse coach from 1932 to 1960. As a college football player during the early 1910s, Miller was a teammate of Jim Thorpe at the Carlisle Indian School.

== Head coaching record ==
Year	Team	Overall	Conference	Standing	Bowl/playoffs
CCNY Beavers (Independent) (1943–1944)
1943	CCNY	1–3–1			
1944	CCNY	0–7			
CCNY:		1–10–1			
Total:		1–10–1			
