= 1943 Temple Owls football team =

American college football season

1943 Temple Owls football
- Conference: Independent
- Record: 2–6
- Head coach: Ray Morrison (4th season)
- Home stadium: Temple Stadium

1943 Eastern college football independents records
	Conf.			Overall
Team	W	L	T	W		L		T
Boston College		–		4	–	0	–	1
Franklin & Marshall		–		7	–	1	–	0
Dartmouth		–		6	–	1	–	0
Rochester		–		6	–	1	–	0
No. 11 Army		–		7	–	2	–	1
Holy Cross		–		6	–	2	–	0
Tufts		–		6	–	2	–	0
No. 20 Penn		–		6	–	2	–	1
Brown		–		5	–	3	–	0
Villanova		–		5	–	3	–	0
Colgate		–		5	–	3	–	1
Penn State		–		5	–	3	–	1
Bucknell		–		6	–	4	–	0
Cornell		–		6	–	4	–	0
Harvard		–		2	–	2	–	1
Yale		–		4	–	5	–	0
Pittsburgh		–		3	–	5	–	0
Temple		–		2	–	6	–	0
CCNY		–		1	–	3	–	1
Princeton		–		1	–	6	–	0
Carnegie Tech		–		0	–	4	–	1
Columbia		–		0	–	8	–	0
Rankings from AP Poll

The 1943 Temple Owls football team was an American football team that represented Temple University as an independent during the 1943 college football season. In its fourth season under head coach Ray Morrison, the team compiled a 2–6 record and was outscored by a total of 163 to 65. The team played its home games at Temple Stadium in Philadelphia.

In the final Litkenhous Ratings, Temple ranked 122nd among the nation's college and service teams with a rating of 59.5.

== Schedule ==
Date	Opponent	Site	Result	Attendance	Source
September 25	VMI	Temple Stadium; Philadelphia, PA	W 27–0	10,000	
October 2	at Swarthmore	Clothier Field Stadium; Swarthmore, PA	W 13–6		
October 9	at No. 3 Army	Michie Stadium; West Point, NY	L 0–51		
October 16	at Ursinus	Collegeville, PA	L 6–10		
October 22	Bucknell	Temple Stadium; Philadelphia, PA	L 6–7	5,000	
November 6	at Holy Cross	Fitton Field; Worcester, MA	L 6–42		
November 13	at Penn State	New Beaver Field; State College, PA	L 0–13	4,142	
November 20	Villanova	Temple Stadium; Philadelphia, PA	L 7–34		
Rankings from AP Poll released prior to the game
