= 1943 Holy Cross Crusaders football team =

American college football season

1943 Holy Cross Crusaders football
- Conference: Independent
- Record: 6–2
- Head coach: Ank Scanlan (2nd season)
- Home stadium: Fitton Field

1943 Eastern college football independents records
	Conf.			Overall
Team	W	L	T	W		L		T
Boston College		–		4	–	0	–	1
Franklin & Marshall		–		7	–	1	–	0
Dartmouth		–		6	–	1	–	0
Rochester		–		6	–	1	–	0
No. 11 Army		–		7	–	2	–	1
Holy Cross		–		6	–	2	–	0
Tufts		–		6	–	2	–	0
No. 20 Penn		–		6	–	2	–	1
Brown		–		5	–	3	–	0
Villanova		–		5	–	3	–	0
Colgate		–		5	–	3	–	1
Penn State		–		5	–	3	–	1
Bucknell		–		6	–	4	–	0
Cornell		–		6	–	4	–	0
Harvard		–		2	–	2	–	1
Yale		–		4	–	5	–	0
Pittsburgh		–		3	–	5	–	0
Temple		–		2	–	6	–	0
CCNY		–		1	–	3	–	1
Princeton		–		1	–	6	–	0
Carnegie Tech		–		0	–	4	–	1
Columbia		–		0	–	8	–	0
Rankings from AP Poll

The 1943 Holy Cross Crusaders football team was an American football team that represented the College of the Holy Cross as an independent during the 1943 college football season. In its second year under head coach Ank Scanlan, the team compiled a 6–2 record. The team played its home games at Fitton Field in Worcester, Massachusetts.

In the final Litkenhous Ratings, Holy Cross ranked 43rd among the nation's college and service teams with a rating of 85.1.

== Schedule ==
Date	Opponent	Site	Result	Attendance	Source
September 26	Dartmouth	Fitton Field; Worcester, MA	L 0–3		
October 2	Brown	Brown Stadium; Providence, RI	W 20–0	8,000	
October 9	Coast Guard	Worcester, MA	W 32–0		
October 16	at Cornell	Schoellkopf Field; Ithaca, NY	L 7–20	5,000	
October 30	Colgate	Fitton Field; Worcester, MA	W 14–7	10,000	
November 6	Temple	Fitton Field; Worcester, MA	W 42–6		
November 14	Villanova	Fitton Field; Worcester, MA	W 12–7		
November 21	vs. Tufts	Fenway Park; Boston, MA	W 41–0		
