= 1943 Brown Bears football team =

American college football season

1943 Brown Bears football
- Conference: Independent
- Record: 5–3
- Head coach: Skip Stahley (3rd season)
- Captain: D. G. Savage Jr.
- Home stadium: Brown Stadium

1943 Eastern college football independents records
	Conf.			Overall
Team	W	L	T	W		L		T
Boston College		–		4	–	0	–	1
Franklin & Marshall		–		7	–	1	–	0
Dartmouth		–		6	–	1	–	0
Rochester		–		6	–	1	–	0
No. 11 Army		–		7	–	2	–	1
Holy Cross		–		6	–	2	–	0
Tufts		–		6	–	2	–	0
No. 20 Penn		–		6	–	2	–	1
Brown		–		5	–	3	–	0
Villanova		–		5	–	3	–	0
Colgate		–		5	–	3	–	1
Penn State		–		5	–	3	–	1
Bucknell		–		6	–	4	–	0
Cornell		–		6	–	4	–	0
Harvard		–		2	–	2	–	1
Yale		–		4	–	5	–	0
Pittsburgh		–		3	–	5	–	0
Temple		–		2	–	6	–	0
CCNY		–		1	–	3	–	1
Princeton		–		1	–	6	–	0
Carnegie Tech		–		0	–	4	–	1
Columbia		–		0	–	8	–	0
Rankings from AP Poll

The 1943 Brown Bears football team represented Brown University during the 1943 college football season.

In their third and final season under head coach Jacob N. "Skip" Stahley, the Bears compiled a 5–3 record, and outscored opponents 194 to 180. D.G. Savage Jr. was the team captain.

In the final Litkenhous Ratings, Brown ranked 96th among the nation's college and service teams with a rating of 67.2.

Brown played its home games at Brown Stadium on the east side of Providence, Rhode Island.

== Schedule ==
Date	Opponent	Site	Result	Attendance	Source
October 2	at Holy Cross	Fitton Field; Worcester, MA	L 0–20	8,000	
October 9	Tufts	Brown Stadium; Providence, RI	W 35–6	5,000	
October 23	Camp Kilmer	Brown Stadium; Providence, RI	W 62–3	5,000	
October 30	at Princeton	Palmer Stadium; Princeton, NJ	W 28–20	1,500	
November 6	at Yale	Yale Bowl; New Haven, CT	W 21–20	15,000	
November 13	Coast Guard	Brown Stadium; Providence, RI	W 34–31	10,000	
November 20	at No. 7 Army	Michie Stadium; West Point, NY	L 0–59		
November 25	Colgate	Brown Stadium; Providence, RI	L 14–21	17,000	
Rankings from AP Poll released prior to the game
