= 1943 Boston College Eagles football team =

American college football season

1943 Boston College Eagles football
- Conference: Independent
- Record: 4–0–1
- Head coach: Moody Sarno (1st season)
- Captain: Ed Doherty
- Home stadium: Alumni Field, Fenway Park

1943 Eastern college football independents records
	Conf.			Overall
Team	W	L	T	W		L		T
Boston College		–		4	–	0	–	1
Franklin & Marshall		–		7	–	1	–	0
Dartmouth		–		6	–	1	–	0
Rochester		–		6	–	1	–	0
No. 11 Army		–		7	–	2	–	1
Holy Cross		–		6	–	2	–	0
Tufts		–		6	–	2	–	0
No. 20 Penn		–		6	–	2	–	1
Brown		–		5	–	3	–	0
Villanova		–		5	–	3	–	0
Colgate		–		5	–	3	–	1
Penn State		–		5	–	3	–	1
Bucknell		–		6	–	4	–	0
Cornell		–		6	–	4	–	0
Harvard		–		2	–	2	–	1
Yale		–		4	–	5	–	0
Pittsburgh		–		3	–	5	–	0
Temple		–		2	–	6	–	0
CCNY		–		1	–	3	–	1
Princeton		–		1	–	6	–	0
Carnegie Tech		–		0	–	4	–	1
Columbia		–		0	–	8	–	0
Rankings from AP Poll

The 1943 Boston College Eagles football team represented Boston College as an independent during the 1943 college football season. The Eagles were led by head coach Moody Sarno, who was in his first year covering for Denny Myers while Myers served in the United States Navy. Boston College played their home games at Alumni Field in Chestnut Hill, Massachusetts and Fenway Park in Boston.

College football in the Boston area was significantly disrupted by World War II, as many college players and coaches left school to serve the war effort. The only player for Boston College left from its 1943 Orange Bowl squad was captain Ed "The Brain" Doherty, who also assisted Moody Sarno in coaching duties. Playing a shortened schedule consisting mainly of teams from military bases, the Eagles finished the year unbeaten with a record of 4–0–1.

In the final Litkenhous Ratings, Boston College ranked 144th among the nation's college and service teams with a rating of 53.3.

== Schedule ==
Date	Opponent	Site	Result	Attendance	Source
October 17	Boston College Army Training team	Alumni Field; Chestnut Hill, MA	W 7–0		
October 24	Camp Hingham	Fenway Park; Boston, MA	W 42–6	10,000	
October 31	Brooklyn	Fenway Park; Boston, MA	W 37–6	11,000	
November 7	Rome Air Force Base	Fenway Park; Boston, MA	W 64–0	14,700	
November 14	at Harvard	Harvard Stadium; Boston, MA	T 6–6	45,000	
