= Moody Sarno =

American football player and coach (1914–1997)

- Sarno pictured in Sub Turri 1944, Boston College yearbook

Biographical details
- Born: September 21, 1914; Boston, Massachusetts, U.S.
- Died: November 9, 1997 (aged 83)

Playing career
- 1933–1935: Fordham
- 1936: Boston Shamrocks
- Position: Tackle

Coaching career (HC unless noted)
- 1938–1939: Everett HS (MA) (assistant)
- 1940: Phillips Andover (MA) (line)
- 1941–1942: Boston College (line)
- 1943–1945: Boston College
- 1955–1982: Everett HS (MA)

Head coaching record
- Overall: 11–7–1 (college); 128–116–11 (high school)

Amerino J. "Moody" Sarno (September 21, 1914 – November 9, 1997) was an American football player and coach. An All-American at Fordham University, he played on the same offensive line as future Pro Football Hall of Famer Vince Lombardi. On March 30, 1941, he was hired as Boston College's line coach. He became the Eagles head coach in 1943 after head coach Denny Myers joined the United States Navy. Sarno himself was the only member of the Boston College coaching staff not to join the United States Armed Forces. In three seasons as head coach at Boston College, he had an 11–7–1 record, including an unbeaten 1943 season. He later served as head coach at his former school, Everett High School in Everett, Massachusetts, from 1955 to 1982. In 28 seasons at Everett, he finished with a 128–116–11 record and won four state championships (1961, 1962, 1964, 1965).

== Head coaching record ==
=== College ===
Year	Team	Overall	Conference	Standing	Bowl/playoffs
Boston College Eagles (Independent) (1943–1945)
1943	Boston College	4–0–1			
1944	Boston College	4–3			
1945	Boston College	4–5			
Boston College:		11–7–1			
Total:		11–7–1			
