= Harry Mahnken =

American football coach (1903–1995)

Biographical details
- Born: July 15, 1903; Brooklyn, New York, U.S.
- Died: February 27, 1995 (aged 91)

Playing career

Football
- c. 1925: Springfield

Baseball
- 1925–1927: Springfield
- 1927: Springfield Ponies
- 1927: Lawrence Merry Macks
- Position: First baseman (baseball)

Coaching career (HC unless noted)

Football
- 1943–1944: Princeton

Harry Arthur Mahnken (July 15, 1903 – February 27, 1995) was an American college football coach. He served as the head football coach at Princeton University from 1943 to 1944, compiling a record of 2–8. A native of Brooklyn, Mahnken attended Springfield College in Springfield, Massachusetts, where he played football and baseball.

== Head coaching record ==
Year	Team	Overall	Conference	Standing	Bowl/playoffs
Princeton Tigers (Independent) (1943–1944)
1943	Princeton	1–6			
1944	Princeton	1–2			
Princeton:		2–8			
Total:		2–8			
