= 1943 college football rankings =

- Season: 1943
- Bowl season: 1943–44 bowl games
- End of season champions: Notre Dame

One human poll comprised the 1943 college football rankings. Unlike most sports, college football's governing body, the NCAA, does not bestow a national championship, instead that title is bestowed by one or more different polling agencies. There are two main weekly polls that begin in the preseason—the AP Poll and the Coaches' Poll. The Coaches' Poll began operation in 1950; in addition, the AP Poll did not begin conducting preseason polls until that same year.

== Legend ==
	Increase in ranking
	Decrease in ranking
	Not ranked previous week
	National champion
(#–#)	Win–loss record
(Italics)	Number of first place votes
т	Tied with team above or below also with this symbol

== AP Poll ==
The final AP Poll was released on November 29, at the end of the 1943 regular season, weeks before the major bowls. The AP would not release a post-bowl season final poll regularly until 1968.

	Week 1 Oct 4	Week 2 Oct 11	Week 3 Oct 18	Week 4 Oct 25	Week 5 Nov 1	Week 6 Nov 8	Week 7 Nov 15	Week 8 Nov 22	Week 9 (Final) Nov 29	
1.	Notre Dame (2–0) (53)	Notre Dame (3–0) (86)	Notre Dame (4–0) (98)	Notre Dame (5–0) (97)	Notre Dame (6–0) (97)	Notre Dame (7–0) (91)	Notre Dame (8–0) (87)	Notre Dame (9–0) (97)	Notre Dame (9–1) (86)	1.
2.	Michigan (3–0) (36)	Army (3–0) (1)	Army (4–0) (5)	Army (5–0) (5)	Purdue (7–0)	Purdue (8–0)	Iowa Pre-Flight (8–0)	Iowa Pre-Flight (8–1) (1)	Iowa Pre-Flight (9–1) (12)	2.
3.	Army (2–0) (4)	Navy (3–0) (1)	Navy (4–0)	Navy (5–0)	Army (5–0–1)	Navy (6–1)	Purdue (8–0)	Michigan (8–1)	Michigan (8–1) (1)	3.
4.	Navy (2–0) (3)	Penn (3–0) (1)	Purdue (5–0) (1)	Purdue (6–0) (1)	USC (6–0) (2)	Michigan (6–1)	Michigan (7–1)	Purdue (9–0)	Navy (8–1)	4.
5.	Duke (3–0) (4)	Purdue (4–0)	Penn (4–0) (4)	USC (5–0)	Penn (5–0–1) (2)	Iowa Pre-Flight (7–0)	Navy (7–1)	Duke (8–1) (2)	Purdue (9–0) (12)	5.
6.	Penn (2–0) (1)	Duke (3–1)	Pacific (CA) (5–0) (4)	Penn (5–0)	Michigan (5–1)	Army (5–1–1)	Duke (7–1) (1)	Navy (7–1)	Great Lakes Navy (8–2) (1)	6.
7.	Purdue (3–0) (2)	Iowa Pre-Flight (4–0)	USC (4–0) (2)	Michigan (4–1)	Navy (5–1)	Duke (6–1)	Army (6–1–1)	Army (7–1–1)	Duke (8–1) (7)	7.
8.	Iowa Pre-Flight (3–0) (2)	USC (3–0)	Iowa Pre-Flight (5–0)	Duke (4–1)	Iowa Pre-Flight (6–0)	Northwestern (5–1)	March Field (6–1)	Northwestern (6–2)	Del Monte Pre-Flight (7–1) (9)	8.
9.	Minnesota (2–0) (1)	Michigan (3–1)	Duke (4–1)	Iowa Pre-Flight (6–0)	Duke (5–1)	USC (6–1)	Northwestern (5–2)	March Field (6–1)	Northwestern (6–2)	9.
10.	USC (2–0)	Pacific (CA) (4–0)	Michigan (3–1)	Pacific (CA) (5–1)	Pacific (CA) (5–1)	Penn (5–1–1)	Texas (6–1)	Del Monte Pre-Flight (6–1)	March Field (6–1)	10.
11.	Southwestern (3–0)	Del Monte Pre-Flight (3–0) (6)	Minnesota (3–0)	Washington (4–0)	Washington (4–0)	Pacific (CA) (6–1)	Washington (4–0)	Washington (4–0)	Army (7–2–1)	11.
12.	Great Lakes Navy (2–1)	March Field (3–0) (4)	Southwestern (TX) (5–0)	Texas (4–1)	Northwestern (4–1)	Washington (4–0)	Texas A&M (7–0–1)	Texas (6–1)	Washington (4–0) (1)	12.
13.	Memphis NAS (2–0)	Minnesota (2–0)	Texas A&M (4–0)	Tulsa (4–0)	Texas (5–1)	Del Monte Pre-Flight (5–1)	Pacific (CA) (7–1)	Dartmouth (6–1)	Georgia Tech (7–3)	13.
14.	Dartmouth (2–0)	Great Lakes Navy (3–1)	March Field (4–0)	Southwestern Louisiana (2–0)	Del Monte Pre-Flight (4–1)	Texas A&M (6–0–1)	Del Monte Pre-Flight (5–1)	Georgia Tech (6–3)	Texas (7–1)	14.
15.	Del Monte Pre-Flight (2–0)	Memphis NAS (3–0)	Del Monte Pre-Flight (3–1)	Northwestern (3–1)	Southwestern Louisiana (2–0)	March Field (5–1)	Georgia Tech (5–3)	Bainbridge (7–0)	Tulsa (6–0–1)	15.
16.	March Field (2–0)	Dartmouth (2–1)	Texas (3–1)	Colorado College (5–0)	Texas A&M (6–0)	Texas (5–1)	Tulsa (5–0–1)	Texas A&M (7–0–1)	Dartmouth (6–1)	16.
17.	LSU (2–0)	Southwestern (TX) (4–0)	Northwestern (2–1)	Del Monte Pre-Flight (4–1)	Arkansas A&M (5–0) т	Tulsa (5–0–1)	Bainbridge (7–0) т	Colorado College (7–0) (2)	Bainbridge (7–0)	17.
18.	Ohio State (2–0)	Texas A&M (3–0)	Colorado College (4–0)	Great Lakes Navy (4–2)	Colorado College (5–0) т	Dartmouth (4–1)	San Diego Naval (5–1) т	Penn (5–2–1) т	Colorado College (7–0) (2)	18.
19.	Northwestern (1–1)	Washington (2–0)	Memphis NAS (3–0)	Texas A&M (5–0)	Tulsa (4–0–1)	Georgia Tech (4–3)	Penn (5–2–1)	Randolph Field (9–0) т	Pacific (CA) (7–1)	19.
20.	Pacific (CA) (3–0)	Georgia (3–1)	Camp Grant (2–3–1)	California (2–3)	LSU (5–1)	San Diego NAS (4–1)	Dartmouth (5–1)	Tulsa (5–0–1)	Penn (6–2–1)	20.
	Week 1 Oct 4	Week 2 Oct 11	Week 3 Oct 18	Week 4 Oct 25	Week 5 Nov 1	Week 6 Nov 8	Week 7 Nov 15	Week 8 Nov 22	Week 9 (Final) Nov 29	
		Dropped: LSU; Northwestern; Ohio State	Dropped: Dartmouth; Georgia; Great Lakes Navy; Washington	Dropped: Camp Grant; March Field; Memphis NAS; Minnesota; Southwestern	Dropped: California; Great Lakes Navy	Dropped: Arkansas A&M; Colorado College; Southwestern Louisiana; LSU	Dropped: USC	Dropped: Pacific (CA); San Diego Naval	Dropped: Randolph Field; Texas A&M	

== Litkenhous Ratings ==
The final Litkenhous Ratings released in December 1943 provided numerical rankings for 253 college and military service football programs. The top 100 ranked teams were:

1. Notre Dame (131.9)
2. Michigan (127.6)
3. Northwestern (120.9)
4. Duke (118.3)
5. Iowa Pre-Flight (113.5)
6. Navy (112.8)
7. Great Lakes Navy (112.3)
8. Purdue (112.1)
9. Georgia Tech (108.8)
10. Memphis NATTC (108.3)
11. Army (104.9)
12. SW Louisiana (104.3)
13. Texas (103.9)
14. 176th Infantry (103.6)
15. Fort Riley (100.7)
16. Indiana (100.7)
17. Ohio State (99.3)
18. North Carolina (97.0)
19. Penn (97.0)
20. Del Monte Pre-Flight (96.8)
21. Minnesota (96.4)
22. Camp Grant (95.6)
23. Marquette (94.9)
24. Bainbridge NTS (94.7)
25. March Field (94.6)
26. Arkansas A&M (93.6)
27. Dartmouth (92.9)
28. Southwestern (TX) (92.0)
29. Tulsa (91.7)
30. 300th Infantry (91.6)
31. Pacific (91.6)
32. Saint Mary's Pre-Flight (90.5)
33. Colorado College (90.2)
34. Iowa (90.2)
35. Illinois (89.6)
36. Texas A&M (88.6)
37. Tulane
38. Camp Lejeune
39. Oberlin
40. Georgia Pre-Flight
41. Oklahoma
42. Washington
43. Holy Cross
44. Emory and Henry
45. USC
46. Wisconsin
47. Fourth Air Force
48. Randolph Field
49. Bunker Hill NAS
50. Miami (OH)
51. DePauw
52. Jacksonville NATTC
53. San Diego NTS
54. LSU
55. Alameda Coast Guard
56. Missouri
57. Cornell
58. Penn State
59. Western Michigan
60. Colgate
61. Kessler Field
62. Colorado
63. Camp Davis
64. Miami (FL)
65. Pittsburgh
66. South Carolina
67. LSU ASTU
68. Fort Warren
69. North Texas
70. Iowa State
71. SMU
72. Georgia
73. Pittsburg State
74. Ottumwa NAS
75. Rochester
76. California
77. Richmond
78. Villanova
79. North Carolina Pre-Flight
80. Wake Forest
81. 124th Infantry
82. New Mexico
83. Franklin & Marshall
84. Sampson NTS
85. Norman NAS
86. Yale
87. Kenyon
88. Lowry Field
89. Bucknell
90. Rice
91. Arkansas
92. UCLA
93. TCU
94. Texas Tech
95. Swarthmore
96. Brown
97. Saint Mary's
98. Lubbock AAF
99. Kirtland Field
100. St. Joseph ATC

== See also ==
- 1943 College Football All-America Team
