= 1943 Clemson Tigers football team =

American college football season

1943 Clemson Tigers football
- Conference: Southern Conference
- Record: 2–6 (2–3 SoCon)
- Head coach: Frank Howard (4th season)
- Captain: Ralph Jenkins
- Home stadium: Memorial Stadium

1943 Southern Conference football standings
	Conf.					Overall
Team	W		L		T	W		L		T
No. 7 Duke $	4	–	0	–	0	8	–	1	–	0
Maryland	2	–	0	–	0	4	–	5	–	0
South Carolina	2	–	1	–	0	5	–	2	–	0
Wake Forest	3	–	2	–	0	4	–	5	–	0
North Carolina	2	–	2	–	0	6	–	3	–	0
Richmond	1	–	1	–	0	6	–	1	–	0
Clemson	2	–	3	–	0	2	–	6	–	0
VMI	2	–	3	–	0	2	–	6	–	0
NC State	1	–	4	–	0	3	–	6	–	0
Davidson	0	–	3	–	0	0	–	5	–	0
$ – Conference champion; Rankings from AP Poll

The 1943 Clemson Tigers football team was an American football team that represented Clemson College as a member of the Southern Conference during the 1943 college football season. In their fourth season under head coach Frank Howard, the Tigers compiled a 2–6 record (2–3 against conference opponents), finished seventh in the conference, and were outscored by a total of 185 to 94. The team played its home games at Memorial Stadium in Clemson, South Carolina.

Ralph Jenkins was the team captain. The team's statistical leaders included tailback Marion "Butch" Butler with 166 passing yards and wingback James Whitmire with 376 rushing yards and 24 points scored (4 touchdowns). Butler was selected as a first-team player on the 1943 All-South Carolina football team.

In the final Litkenhous Ratings, Case ranked 141st among the nation's college and service teams with a rating of 54.2.

== Schedule ==
Date	Opponent	Site	Result	Attendance	Source
September 25	Presbyterian*	Memorial Stadium; Clemson, SC	L 12–13	5,500	
October 2	vs. NC State	American Legion Memorial Stadium; Charlotte, NC (rivalry)	W 19–7	8,000	
October 9	vs. VMI	Victory Stadium; Roanoke, VA	L 7–12	5,000	
October 21	at South Carolina	Carolina Stadium; Columbia, SC (rivalry)	L 6–33	18,000	
October 30	Wake Forest	Memorial Stadium; Clemson, SC	L 12–41	5,500	
November 6	at Davidson	American Legion Memorial Stadium; Charlotte, NC	W 26–6	4,000	
November 13	vs. Georgia Pre-Flight*	Sirrine Stadium; Greenville, SC	L 6–32	4,500	
November 20	at No. 15 Georgia Tech*	Grant Field; Atlanta, GA (rivalry)	L 6–41	10,000	
*Non-conference game; Rankings from AP Poll released prior to the game
