= 1943 Lakehurst Naval Air Station Blimps football team =

American college football season

1943 Lakehurst Naval Air Station Blimps football
- Conference: Independent
- Record: 2–4
- Head coach: Mal Elward (2nd season)

1943 military service football records
	Conf.			Overall
Team	W	L	T	W		L		T
No. 17 Bainbridge		–		7	–	0	–	0
Bunker Hill NAS		–		6	–	0	–	0
Greensboro		–		4	–	0	–	0
Memphis NATTC		–		2	–	0	–	0
No. 2 Iowa Pre-Flight		–		9	–	1	–	0
No. 10 March Field		–		9	–	1	–	0
No. 8 Del Monte Pre-Flight		–		7	–	1	–	0
Randolph Field		–		9	–	1	–	1
Georgia Pre-Flight		–		5	–	1	–	0
No. 6 Great Lakes Navy		–		10	–	2	–	0
Lubbock AAF		–		5	–	1	–	0
Ottumwa NAS		–		5	–	1	–	0
Camp Davis		–		8	–	2	–	0
Sampson NTS		–		7	–	2	–	0
San Diego NTS		–		7	–	2	–	0
Keesler Field		–		3	–	1	–	0
Wright Field		–		1	–	0	–	1
Camp Lejeune		–		6	–	2	–	1
Fort Riley		–		6	–	2	–	1
Kearns Field		–		5	–	2	–	0
Fort Knox		–		4	–	2	–	0
Cherry Point Marines		–		4	–	2	–	1
Alameda Coast Guard		–		4	–	2	–	1
Fort Douglas		–		4	–	2	–	1
300th Infantry		–		5	–	3	–	0
176th Infantry		–		4	–	3	–	0
Blackland AAF		–		4	–	3	–	0
Fort Sheridan		–		4	–	3	–	0
Fort Warren		–		4	–	3	–	0
Norman NAS		–		4	–	3	–	0
Charleston Coast Guard		–		5	–	4	–	0
Salt Lake AAB		–		4	–	3	–	2
124th Infantry		–		2	–	2	–	0
Camp Kilmer		–		2	–	2	–	0
Camp Lee		–		5	–	5	–	0
Logan Navy		–		2	–	2	–	0
Spokane Air Service		–		2	–	2	–	0
Camp Edwards		–		4	–	5	–	0
Curtis Bay Coast Guard		–		4	–	5	–	0
Saint Mary's Pre-Flight		–		3	–	4	–	1
Jacksonville NATTC		–		3	–	4	–	0
Richmond AAB		–		4	–	6	–	1
Atlantic City NAS		–		2	–	3	–	0
North Carolina Pre-Flight		–		2	–	4	–	1
Patterson Field		–		2	–	4	–	1
Bowman Field		–		2	–	4	–	0
Kirtland Field		–		1	–	2	–	0
Lakehurst NAS		–		2	–	4	–	0
Camp Grant		–		2	–	6	–	2
Lowry Field		–		1	–	3	–	0
Fort Monroe		–		3	–	7	–	0
Daniel Field		–		2	–	7	–	0
Camp Gordon		–		1	–	4	–	0
South Plains AAF		–		1	–	4	–	0
Greenville AAB		–		1	–	5	–	0
Ward Island Marines		–		1	–	5	–	0
Bryan AAF		–		1	–	6	–	0
Pocatello AAB		–		0	–	3	–	0
Norfolk Fleet Marines		–		0	–	9	–	0
Rankings from AP Poll

The 1943 Lakehurst Naval Air Station Blimps football team represented the United States Navy's Lakehurst Naval Air Station (Lakehurst NAS), located in Ocean County, New Jersey, during the 1943 college football season. Led by second-year head coach Mal Elward, the Blimps compiled a record of 2–4. Bob Titchenal was an assistant coach and player for the team.

In the final Litkenhous Ratings, Lakehurst NAS ranked 196th among the nation's college and service teams with a rating of 38.7.

== Schedule ==
Date	Time	Opponent	Site	Result	Attendance	Source
September 18		at Princeton	Palmer Stadium; Princeton, NJ	L 12–61 (scrimmage)		
September 25	2:30 p.m.	at Muhlenberg	Muhlenberg Field; Allentown, PA	L 0–13	2,000	
October 6		at Army Plebes	West Point, NY	W 6–0		
October 16	2:00 p.m.	at No. 4 Penn	Franklin Field; Philadelphia, PA	L 6–74	25,000	
October 23	8:30 p.m.	at Villanova	Shibe Park; Philadelphia, PA	L 14–27	5,000	
November 6	2:30 p.m.	at Bucknell	Memorial Stadium; Lewisburg, PA	L 0–13	10,000	
November 14		at Camp Kilmer	Rutgers Stadium; Piscataway, NJ	W 26–12		
Rankings from AP Poll released prior to the game; All times are in Eastern time
