= 1943 NC State Wolfpack football team =

American college football season

1943 NC State Wolfpack football
- Conference: Southern Conference
- Record: 3–6 (0–4 SoCon)
- Head coach: Williams Newton (7th season)
- Home stadium: Riddick Stadium

1943 Southern Conference football standings
	Conf.					Overall
Team	W		L		T	W		L		T
No. 7 Duke $	4	–	0	–	0	8	–	1	–	0
Maryland	2	–	0	–	0	4	–	5	–	0
South Carolina	2	–	1	–	0	5	–	2	–	0
Wake Forest	3	–	2	–	0	4	–	5	–	0
North Carolina	2	–	2	–	0	6	–	3	–	0
Richmond	1	–	1	–	0	6	–	1	–	0
Clemson	2	–	3	–	0	2	–	6	–	0
VMI	2	–	3	–	0	2	–	6	–	0
NC State	1	–	4	–	0	3	–	6	–	0
Davidson	0	–	3	–	0	0	–	5	–	0
$ – Conference champion; Rankings from AP Poll

The 1943 NC State Wolfpack football team was an American football team that represented North Carolina State University as a member of the Southern Conference (SoCon) during the 1943 college football season. In its seventh and final season under head coach Williams Newton, the team compiled a 3–6 record (0–4 against SoCon opponents) and was outscored by a total of 229 to 78.

In the final Litkenhous Ratings, NC State ranked 161th among the nation's college and service teams with a rating of 50.9.

== Schedule ==
Date	Time	Opponent	Site	Result	Attendance	Source
September 25		Newport News Naval Training Station*	Riddick Stadium; Raleigh, NC	W 18–0	5,000	
October 2		vs. Clemson	American Legion Memorial Stadium; Charlotte, NC (rivalry)	L 7–19	8,000	
October 9	2:30 p.m.	at Camp Davis*	Camp Davis, NC	L 0–27	22,000	
October 16		Wake Forest	Riddick Stadium; Raleigh, NC (rivalry)	L 6–54	9,000	
October 23	3:00 p.m.	at Greenville AAB*	Sirrine Stadium; Greenville, NC	W 7–6	2,500	
October 30		at North Carolina	Kenan Memorial Stadium; Chapel Hill, NC (rivalry)	L 13–27		
November 6		No. 9 Duke	Riddick Stadium; Raleigh, NC (rivalry)	L 0–75	6,000	
November 13		at Davidson*	American Legion Memorial Stadium; Charlotte, NC	W 20–0	2,500	
November 25		North Carolina Pre-Flight*	Riddick Stadium; Raleigh, NC	L 7–21	3,000	
*Non-conference game; Rankings from AP Poll released prior to the game; All times are in Eastern time
