= 1943 March Field Flyers football team =

American college football season

1943 March Field Flyers football
- Conference: Independent

Ranking
- AP: No. 10
- Record: 9–1
- Head coach: Paul J. Schissler (2nd season)
- Home stadium: Wheelock Field

1943 military service football records
	Conf.			Overall
Team	W	L	T	W		L		T
No. 17 Bainbridge		–		7	–	0	–	0
Bunker Hill NAS		–		6	–	0	–	0
Greensboro		–		4	–	0	–	0
Memphis NATTC		–		2	–	0	–	0
No. 2 Iowa Pre-Flight		–		9	–	1	–	0
No. 10 March Field		–		9	–	1	–	0
No. 8 Del Monte Pre-Flight		–		7	–	1	–	0
Randolph Field		–		9	–	1	–	1
Georgia Pre-Flight		–		5	–	1	–	0
No. 6 Great Lakes Navy		–		10	–	2	–	0
Lubbock AAF		–		5	–	1	–	0
Ottumwa NAS		–		5	–	1	–	0
Camp Davis		–		8	–	2	–	0
Sampson NTS		–		7	–	2	–	0
San Diego NTS		–		7	–	2	–	0
Keesler Field		–		3	–	1	–	0
Wright Field		–		1	–	0	–	1
Camp Lejeune		–		6	–	2	–	1
Fort Riley		–		6	–	2	–	1
Kearns Field		–		5	–	2	–	0
Fort Knox		–		4	–	2	–	0
Cherry Point Marines		–		4	–	2	–	1
Alameda Coast Guard		–		4	–	2	–	1
Fort Douglas		–		4	–	2	–	1
300th Infantry		–		5	–	3	–	0
176th Infantry		–		4	–	3	–	0
Blackland AAF		–		4	–	3	–	0
Fort Sheridan		–		4	–	3	–	0
Fort Warren		–		4	–	3	–	0
Norman NAS		–		4	–	3	–	0
Charleston Coast Guard		–		5	–	4	–	0
Salt Lake AAB		–		4	–	3	–	2
124th Infantry		–		2	–	2	–	0
Camp Kilmer		–		2	–	2	–	0
Camp Lee		–		5	–	5	–	0
Logan Navy		–		2	–	2	–	0
Spokane Air Service		–		2	–	2	–	0
Camp Edwards		–		4	–	5	–	0
Curtis Bay Coast Guard		–		4	–	5	–	0
Saint Mary's Pre-Flight		–		3	–	4	–	1
Jacksonville NATTC		–		3	–	4	–	0
Richmond AAB		–		4	–	6	–	1
Atlantic City NAS		–		2	–	3	–	0
North Carolina Pre-Flight		–		2	–	4	–	1
Patterson Field		–		2	–	4	–	1
Bowman Field		–		2	–	4	–	0
Kirtland Field		–		1	–	2	–	0
Lakehurst NAS		–		2	–	4	–	0
Camp Grant		–		2	–	6	–	2
Lowry Field		–		1	–	3	–	0
Fort Monroe		–		3	–	7	–	0
Daniel Field		–		2	–	7	–	0
Camp Gordon		–		1	–	4	–	0
South Plains AAF		–		1	–	4	–	0
Greenville AAB		–		1	–	5	–	0
Ward Island Marines		–		1	–	5	–	0
Bryan AAF		–		1	–	6	–	0
Pocatello AAB		–		0	–	3	–	0
Norfolk Fleet Marines		–		0	–	9	–	0
Rankings from AP Poll

The 1943 March Field Flyers football team represented the United States Army Air Forces' Fourth Air Force stationed at March Field during the 1943 college football season. The base was located in Riverside, California. The team compiled a 9–1 record, outscored all opponents by a total of 292 to 65, and was ranked No. 10 in the final AP poll. It defeated both UCLA and USC (then ranked No. 9), and it sole loss was on the road against Washington.

The team was coached by Major Paul J. Schissler, a former NFL coach. The team was led on the field by Jack Jacobs, who was later inducted into the Canadian Football Hall of Fame.

In the final Litkenhous Ratings, March Field ranked 25th among the nation's college and service teams with a rating of 94.6.

== Schedule ==
Date	Opponent	Rank	Site	Result	Attendance	Source
September 26	Pacific All-Stars		Wheelock Field; Riverside, CA	W 45–13	5,500	
October 2	Redlands		Wheelock Field; Riverside, CA	W 40–0		
October 9	UCLA	No. 16	Wheelock Field; Riverside, CA	W 47–7	9,000	
October 16	at San Diego NTS	No. 12	San Diego, CA	W 7–0	6,000	
October 23	at Washington	No. 14	Husky Stadium; Seattle, WA	L 7–27	18,000	
October 30	at St. Mary's Pre-Flight		Kezar Stadium; San Francisco, CA	W 7–6	25,000	
November 7	Pomona Army Ordnance		Wheelock Field; Riverside, CA	W 72–0	2,500	
November 13	at No. 9 USC	No. 15	Los Angeles Memorial Coliseum; Los Angeles, CA	W 35–0	30,000	
November 28	San Diego NTS	No. 9	Wheelock Field; Riverside, CA	W 13–2	14,000	
December 11	Pacific (CA)	No. 9	Los Angeles Memorial Coliseum; Los Angeles, CA	W 19–10	7,500	
Rankings from AP Poll released prior to the game

== Rankings ==
Ranking movements Legend: ██ Increase in ranking ██ Decrease in ranking — = Not ranked ( ) = First-place votes
	Week								
Poll	1	2	3	4	5	6	7	8	Final
AP	16	12 (4)	14	—	—	15	8	9	10
