= 1943 Randolph Field Ramblers football team =

American college football season

1943 Randolph Field Ramblers football

Cotton Bowl, T 7–7 vs. Texas
- Conference: Independent
- Record: 9–1–1
- Head coach: Frank Tritico (1st season)
- Home stadium: Grater Field, Alamo Stadium

1943 military service football records
	Conf.			Overall
Team	W	L	T	W		L		T
No. 17 Bainbridge		–		7	–	0	–	0
Bunker Hill NAS		–		6	–	0	–	0
Greensboro		–		4	–	0	–	0
Memphis NATTC		–		2	–	0	–	0
No. 2 Iowa Pre-Flight		–		9	–	1	–	0
No. 10 March Field		–		9	–	1	–	0
No. 8 Del Monte Pre-Flight		–		7	–	1	–	0
Randolph Field		–		9	–	1	–	1
Georgia Pre-Flight		–		5	–	1	–	0
No. 6 Great Lakes Navy		–		10	–	2	–	0
Lubbock AAF		–		5	–	1	–	0
Ottumwa NAS		–		5	–	1	–	0
Camp Davis		–		8	–	2	–	0
Sampson NTS		–		7	–	2	–	0
San Diego NTS		–		7	–	2	–	0
Keesler Field		–		3	–	1	–	0
Wright Field		–		1	–	0	–	1
Camp Lejeune		–		6	–	2	–	1
Fort Riley		–		6	–	2	–	1
Kearns Field		–		5	–	2	–	0
Fort Knox		–		4	–	2	–	0
Cherry Point Marines		–		4	–	2	–	1
Alameda Coast Guard		–		4	–	2	–	1
Fort Douglas		–		4	–	2	–	1
300th Infantry		–		5	–	3	–	0
176th Infantry		–		4	–	3	–	0
Blackland AAF		–		4	–	3	–	0
Fort Sheridan		–		4	–	3	–	0
Fort Warren		–		4	–	3	–	0
Norman NAS		–		4	–	3	–	0
Charleston Coast Guard		–		5	–	4	–	0
Salt Lake AAB		–		4	–	3	–	2
124th Infantry		–		2	–	2	–	0
Camp Kilmer		–		2	–	2	–	0
Camp Lee		–		5	–	5	–	0
Logan Navy		–		2	–	2	–	0
Spokane Air Service		–		2	–	2	–	0
Camp Edwards		–		4	–	5	–	0
Curtis Bay Coast Guard		–		4	–	5	–	0
Saint Mary's Pre-Flight		–		3	–	4	–	1
Jacksonville NATTC		–		3	–	4	–	0
Richmond AAB		–		4	–	6	–	1
Atlantic City NAS		–		2	–	3	–	0
North Carolina Pre-Flight		–		2	–	4	–	1
Patterson Field		–		2	–	4	–	1
Bowman Field		–		2	–	4	–	0
Kirtland Field		–		1	–	2	–	0
Lakehurst NAS		–		2	–	4	–	0
Camp Grant		–		2	–	6	–	2
Lowry Field		–		1	–	3	–	0
Fort Monroe		–		3	–	7	–	0
Daniel Field		–		2	–	7	–	0
Camp Gordon		–		1	–	4	–	0
South Plains AAF		–		1	–	4	–	0
Greenville AAB		–		1	–	5	–	0
Ward Island Marines		–		1	–	5	–	0
Bryan AAF		–		1	–	6	–	0
Pocatello AAB		–		0	–	3	–	0
Norfolk Fleet Marines		–		0	–	9	–	0
Rankings from AP Poll

The 1943 Randolph Field Ramblers football team represented the United States Army Air Forces' Randolph Field during the 1943 college football season. Randolph Field was located about 15 miles east-northeast of San Antonio, Texas. The team compiled a 9–1–1 record and played Texas to a 7–7 tie in the 1944 Cotton Bowl Classic on January 1, 1944.

Frank Tritico, who coached Lake Charles, Louisiana, high school teams to two state championships, was the team's head coach. His assistant coaches were Butch Morse, Leland Killian, and Walter Parker.

Glenn Dobbs was the star of the Randolph Field offense in 1943. Dobbs was the only Randolph player named to the Associated Press 1943 Service All-America team. He also played at Tulsa and was later inducted into the College Football Hall of Fame.

In the final Litkenhous Ratings, Randolph Field ranked 48th among the nation's college and service teams with a rating of 83.5.

== Schedule ==
Date	Time	Opponent	Rank	Site	Result	Attendance	Source
September 18		Bryan AAF		Grater Field; Randolph Field, TX	W 30–0		
September 25		at Rice		Rice Field; Houston, TX	W 6–0	12,000	
October 2		Ward Island Marines		Grater Field; Randolph Field, TX	W 39–9		
October 9		vs. Bryan AAF		Yoakum, TX	W 47–0		
October 23		at Blackland AAF		Municipal Stadium; Waco, TX	W 7–0		
October 30		University of Mexico		Alamo Stadium; San Antonio, TX	W 34–0	12,000	
November 6		Blackland AAF		Grater Field; Randolph Field, TX	W 26–7		
November 13	2:30 p.m.	at Ward Island Marines		Buccaneer Stadium; Corpus Christi, TX	W 53–14		
November 20		North Texas Aggies		Grater Field; Randolph Field, TX	W 20–13		
November 27		Southwestern Louisiana	No. 18	Alamo Stadium; San Antonio, TX	L 0–6	5,000	
January 1		vs. No. 14 Texas		Cotton Bowl; Dallas, TX (Cotton Bowl)	T 7–7	15,000	
Rankings from AP Poll released prior to the game; All times are in Central time

== Rankings ==
Ranking movements Legend: ██ Increase in ranking ██ Decrease in ranking — = Not ranked т = Tied with team above or below
	Week								
Poll	1	2	3	4	5	6	7	8	Final
AP	—	—	—	—	—	—	—	18т	—
