= 1943 Iowa Pre-Flight Seahawks football team =

American college football season

1943 Iowa Pre-Flight Seahawks football
- Conference: Independent

Ranking
- AP: No. 2
- Record: 9–1
- Head coach: Don Faurot (1st season)
- Home stadium: Iowa Stadium

1943 military service football records
	Conf.			Overall
Team	W	L	T	W		L		T
No. 17 Bainbridge		–		7	–	0	–	0
Bunker Hill NAS		–		6	–	0	–	0
Greensboro		–		4	–	0	–	0
Memphis NATTC		–		2	–	0	–	0
No. 2 Iowa Pre-Flight		–		9	–	1	–	0
No. 10 March Field		–		9	–	1	–	0
No. 8 Del Monte Pre-Flight		–		7	–	1	–	0
Randolph Field		–		9	–	1	–	1
Georgia Pre-Flight		–		5	–	1	–	0
No. 6 Great Lakes Navy		–		10	–	2	–	0
Lubbock AAF		–		5	–	1	–	0
Ottumwa NAS		–		5	–	1	–	0
Camp Davis		–		8	–	2	–	0
Sampson NTS		–		7	–	2	–	0
San Diego NTS		–		7	–	2	–	0
Keesler Field		–		3	–	1	–	0
Wright Field		–		1	–	0	–	1
Camp Lejeune		–		6	–	2	–	1
Fort Riley		–		6	–	2	–	1
Kearns Field		–		5	–	2	–	0
Fort Knox		–		4	–	2	–	0
Cherry Point Marines		–		4	–	2	–	1
Alameda Coast Guard		–		4	–	2	–	1
Fort Douglas		–		4	–	2	–	1
300th Infantry		–		5	–	3	–	0
176th Infantry		–		4	–	3	–	0
Blackland AAF		–		4	–	3	–	0
Fort Sheridan		–		4	–	3	–	0
Fort Warren		–		4	–	3	–	0
Norman NAS		–		4	–	3	–	0
Charleston Coast Guard		–		5	–	4	–	0
Salt Lake AAB		–		4	–	3	–	2
124th Infantry		–		2	–	2	–	0
Camp Kilmer		–		2	–	2	–	0
Camp Lee		–		5	–	5	–	0
Logan Navy		–		2	–	2	–	0
Spokane Air Service		–		2	–	2	–	0
Camp Edwards		–		4	–	5	–	0
Curtis Bay Coast Guard		–		4	–	5	–	0
Saint Mary's Pre-Flight		–		3	–	4	–	1
Jacksonville NATTC		–		3	–	4	–	0
Richmond AAB		–		4	–	6	–	1
Atlantic City NAS		–		2	–	3	–	0
North Carolina Pre-Flight		–		2	–	4	–	1
Patterson Field		–		2	–	4	–	1
Bowman Field		–		2	–	4	–	0
Kirtland Field		–		1	–	2	–	0
Lakehurst NAS		–		2	–	4	–	0
Camp Grant		–		2	–	6	–	2
Lowry Field		–		1	–	3	–	0
Fort Monroe		–		3	–	7	–	0
Daniel Field		–		2	–	7	–	0
Camp Gordon		–		1	–	4	–	0
South Plains AAF		–		1	–	4	–	0
Greenville AAB		–		1	–	5	–	0
Ward Island Marines		–		1	–	5	–	0
Bryan AAF		–		1	–	6	–	0
Pocatello AAB		–		0	–	3	–	0
Norfolk Fleet Marines		–		0	–	9	–	0
Rankings from AP Poll

The 1943 Iowa Pre-Flight Seahawks football team represented the United States Navy pre-flight school at the University of Iowa as an independent during the 1943 college football season. In the second season of intercollegiate football at the pre-flight school, the team compiled a 9–1 record, outscored opponents by a total of 277 to 98, and was ranked No. 2 in the final AP poll.

In July 1943, Don Faurot—previously the head football coach at Missouri and recently enlisted in the Navy with a rank of lieutenant—was assigned to take over from Bernie Bierman as the team's head coach. Upon arriving in Iowa City in August, 100 candidates tried out at Faurot's first football practice session. Faurot said he would use a T formation and promised at the time that "we will have a fighting squad and a fighting team."

Four Iowa Pre-Flight players were named to the Associated Press' 1943 AP Service All-America team. Center Vince Banonis and back Dick Todd were named to the first team. End Perry Schwartz and guard Nick Kerasiotis were named to the second team.

In the final Litkenhous Ratings, Iowa Pre-Flight ranked fifth among the nation's college and service teams with a rating of 113.5.

== Schedule ==
Date	Opponent	Rank	Site	Result	Attendance	Source
September 18	at Illinois		Memorial Stadium; Champaign, IL	W 32–18	8,500	
September 25	at Ohio State		Ohio Stadium; Columbus, OH	W 28–13	23,496	
October 2	at Iowa State		Clyde Williams Field; Ames, IA	W 33–13	10,000	
October 9	vs. Iowa	No. 8	Iowa Stadium; Iowa City, IA	W 25–0	10,000	
October 16	at Missouri	No. 7	Ruppert Stadium; Kansas City, MO	W 21–6	12,414	
October 30	Fort Riley	No. 9	Iowa Stadium; Iowa City, IA	W 19–2	< 3,500	
November 7	at Marquette	No. 8	Marquette Stadium; Milwaukee, WI	W 46–19	3,000	
November 13	Camp Grant	No. 5	Iowa Stadium; Iowa City, IA	W 28–13		
November 20	at No. 1 Notre Dame	No. 2	Notre Dame Stadium; Notre Dame, IN	L 13–14	45,000	
November 27	at Minnesota	No. 2	Memorial Stadium; Minneapolis, MN	W 32–0	18,261	
Rankings from AP Poll released prior to the game

== Rankings ==
Ranking movements Legend: ██ Increase in ranking ██ Decrease in ranking ( ) = First-place votes
	Week								
Poll	1	2	3	4	5	6	7	8	Final
AP	8 (2)	7	8	9	8	5	2	2 (1)	2 (12)

== Roster ==
Players who started at least half of the games are shown in bold.

Player	Position	Previous team	Games started
**Vince Banonis**	Center	Chicago Cardinals (1942)	5 games: OSU, FR, Marquette, CG, ND
Burk	End		1 game: MN
**Bob Carlson**	Tackle		9 games: Illinois, OSU, Iowa, Missouri, FR, Marquette, CG, ND, MN
Ray Carlson	Guard		3 games: Illinois, OSU, ISU
Chesbro	End		3 games: Marquette, ND, MN
Claffey	Tackle		1 games: ISU
**Clements**	End		9 games: Illinois, OSU, ISU, Iowa, Missouri, FR, Marquette, CG, ND
Connor	End		2 games: FR, CG
**Dusenbury**	End		5 games: Illinois, OSU, ISU, Iowa, Missouri
Art Guepe	Back	Marquette (1934-1936)	2 games: ND, MN
Angelo Guerriero	Center		3 games: ISU, Iowa, Missouri
**Heinz**	Halfback		5 games: Illinois, OSU, ISU, Marquette, CG
Higgins	Halfback		2 games: ND, MN
Hook	Guard		2 games: Marquette, CG
Jebb	Center		1 game: Illinois
**Nick Kerasiotis**	Guard	Ambrose	9 games: OSU, ISU, Iowa, Missouri, FR, Marquette, CG, ND, MN
Dick Kieppe	Halfback	Michigan State	2 games: Iowa, Missouri
Kramer	Tackle		4 games: Marquette, CG, ND, MN
Large	Tackle		3 games: Iowa, Missouri, FR
Magel	Tackle		3 games: Illinois, OSU, ISU
**Frank Maznicki**	Halfback	Chicago Bears (1942)	7 games: OSU, ISU, Iowa, Missouri, FR, Marquette, CG
**Bus Mertes**	Fullback	Iowa (1941)	10 games: Illinois, OSU, ISU, Iowa, Missouri, FR, Marquette, CG, ND, MN
Olson	Center		1 game: MN
Perry Schwartz	End	Brooklyn Dodgers (1938–1942)	No starts
**Jimmy Smith**	HB, QB	Illinois	7 games: Illinois (HB), OSU (QB), ISU (QB), Iowa (QB), CG (QB), ND (QB), MN (QB)
Bob Timmons	Back	Pittsburgh	No starts
**Tobin**	Guard		5 games: Iowa, Missouri, FR, ND, MN
Dick Todd	Halfback	Washington Redskins (1939–1942)	1 game: FR
Williams	QB		4 games: Illinois, Missouri, FR, Marquette
Ziebarth	Guard		1 game: Illinois
