= 1943 Camp Lejeune Marines football team =

American college football season

1943 Camp Lejeune Marines football
- Conference: Independent
- Record: 6–2–1
- Head coach: Marvin Bell (1st season; first 2 games); Jack Chevigny (1st season, last 7 games)

1943 military service football records
	Conf.			Overall
Team	W	L	T	W		L		T
No. 17 Bainbridge		–		7	–	0	–	0
Bunker Hill NAS		–		6	–	0	–	0
Greensboro		–		4	–	0	–	0
Memphis NATTC		–		2	–	0	–	0
No. 2 Iowa Pre-Flight		–		9	–	1	–	0
No. 10 March Field		–		9	–	1	–	0
No. 8 Del Monte Pre-Flight		–		7	–	1	–	0
Randolph Field		–		9	–	1	–	1
Georgia Pre-Flight		–		5	–	1	–	0
No. 6 Great Lakes Navy		–		10	–	2	–	0
Lubbock AAF		–		5	–	1	–	0
Ottumwa NAS		–		5	–	1	–	0
Camp Davis		–		8	–	2	–	0
Sampson NTS		–		7	–	2	–	0
San Diego NTS		–		7	–	2	–	0
Keesler Field		–		3	–	1	–	0
Wright Field		–		1	–	0	–	1
Camp Lejeune		–		6	–	2	–	1
Fort Riley		–		6	–	2	–	1
Kearns Field		–		5	–	2	–	0
Fort Knox		–		4	–	2	–	0
Cherry Point Marines		–		4	–	2	–	1
Alameda Coast Guard		–		4	–	2	–	1
Fort Douglas		–		4	–	2	–	1
300th Infantry		–		5	–	3	–	0
176th Infantry		–		4	–	3	–	0
Blackland AAF		–		4	–	3	–	0
Fort Sheridan		–		4	–	3	–	0
Fort Warren		–		4	–	3	–	0
Norman NAS		–		4	–	3	–	0
Charleston Coast Guard		–		5	–	4	–	0
Salt Lake AAB		–		4	–	3	–	2
124th Infantry		–		2	–	2	–	0
Camp Kilmer		–		2	–	2	–	0
Camp Lee		–		5	–	5	–	0
Logan Navy		–		2	–	2	–	0
Spokane Air Service		–		2	–	2	–	0
Camp Edwards		–		4	–	5	–	0
Curtis Bay Coast Guard		–		4	–	5	–	0
Saint Mary's Pre-Flight		–		3	–	4	–	1
Jacksonville NATTC		–		3	–	4	–	0
Richmond AAB		–		4	–	6	–	1
Atlantic City NAS		–		2	–	3	–	0
North Carolina Pre-Flight		–		2	–	4	–	1
Patterson Field		–		2	–	4	–	1
Bowman Field		–		2	–	4	–	0
Kirtland Field		–		1	–	2	–	0
Lakehurst NAS		–		2	–	4	–	0
Camp Grant		–		2	–	6	–	2
Lowry Field		–		1	–	3	–	0
Fort Monroe		–		3	–	7	–	0
Daniel Field		–		2	–	7	–	0
Camp Gordon		–		1	–	4	–	0
South Plains AAF		–		1	–	4	–	0
Greenville AAB		–		1	–	5	–	0
Ward Island Marines		–		1	–	5	–	0
Bryan AAF		–		1	–	6	–	0
Pocatello AAB		–		0	–	3	–	0
Norfolk Fleet Marines		–		0	–	9	–	0
Rankings from AP Poll

The 1943 Camp Lejeune Marines football team represented the United States Marine Corps's Camp Lejeune, located in New River, North Carolina, during the 1943 college football season. The Marines compiled a record of 6–2–1. Second Lieutenant Marvin Bell was named head coach of the team on September 9. Bell had graduated from Marquette University in 1936 and served as ends coach for the Marquette football team under head coaches Frank Murray, Paddy Driscoll, and Thomas E. Stidham. On September 30, after the first two games of the season, Jack Chevigny was appointed the team's head coach. Bell remained an assistant coach for the team along with Jack Thurner, who had played college football as a tackle at North Carolina State University and coached at Memphis Catholic High School in 1942. The team's roster included Chuck Drulis and Bob Fitch.

In the final Litkenhous Ratings, Camp Lejeune ranked 38th among the nation's college and service teams with a rating of 86.5.

== Schedule ==
Date	Time	Opponent	Site	Result	Attendance	Source
September 18	3:30 p.m.	at Duke	Duke Stadium; Durham, NC	L 0–40	12,076	
September 25	3:00 p.m.	Bainbridge	New River, NC	L 0–9		
October 9	2:00 p.m.	North Carolina B team	New River, NC	W 26–0		
October 16	2:00 p.m.	Fort Monroe	New River, NC	W 51–0		
October 23	3:00 p.m.	Jacksonville NATTC	New River, NC	W 20–7		
October 30	2:00 p.m.	Camp Davis	New River, NC	W 14–0		
November 6	2:00 p.m.	Norfolk Fleet Marines	New River, NC	W 55–6		
November 13	2:30 p.m.	at North Carolina Pre-Flight	Kenan Memorial Stadium; Chapel Hill, NC	T 14–14		
November 27		at Jacksonville NATTC	Jacksonville, FL	W 13–6	5,000	
All times are in Eastern time
