= 1943 Duke Blue Devils football team =

American college football season

1943 Duke Blue Devils football

SoCon champion
- Conference: Southern Conference

Ranking
- AP: No. 7
- Record: 8–1 (4–0 SoCon)
- Head coach: Eddie Cameron (2nd season)
- Captain: Game captains
- Home stadium: Duke Stadium

1943 Southern Conference football standings
| | Conf. | | | | | Overall |
| Team | W | | L | | T | W | | L | | T |
|---|---|---|---|---|---|---|---|---|---|---|
| No. 7 Duke $ | 4 | – | 0 | – | 0 | 8 | – | 1 | – | 0 |
| Maryland | 2 | – | 0 | – | 0 | 4 | – | 5 | – | 0 |
| South Carolina | 2 | – | 1 | – | 0 | 5 | – | 2 | – | 0 |
| Wake Forest | 3 | – | 2 | – | 0 | 4 | – | 5 | – | 0 |
| North Carolina | 2 | – | 2 | – | 0 | 6 | – | 3 | – | 0 |
| Richmond | 1 | – | 1 | – | 0 | 6 | – | 1 | – | 0 |
| Clemson | 2 | – | 3 | – | 0 | 2 | – | 6 | – | 0 |
| VMI | 2 | – | 3 | – | 0 | 2 | – | 6 | – | 0 |
| NC State | 1 | – | 4 | – | 0 | 3 | – | 6 | – | 0 |
| Davidson | 0 | – | 3 | – | 0 | 0 | – | 5 | – | 0 |
$ – Conference champion; Rankings from AP Poll

The 1943 Duke Blue Devils football team was an American football team that represented Duke University as a member of the Southern Conference during the 1943 college football season. In its second season under head coach Eddie Cameron, the team compiled an 8–1 record (4–0 against conference opponents), won the conference championship, was ranked No. 7 in the final AP Poll, and outscored opponents by a total of 335 to 34.

The team ranked first among the nation's 76 major college teams in both scoring offense (37.2 points per game) and scoring defense (3.8 points per game).

In the final Litkenhous Ratings, Duke ranked fourth among the nation's college and service teams with a rating of 118.3.

The team played its home games at Duke Stadium in Durham, North Carolina.

== Schedule ==
| Date | Time | Opponent | Rank | Site | Result | Attendance | Source |
|---|---|---|---|---|---|---|---|
| September 18 | 3:30 p.m. | Camp Lejeune* | | Duke Stadium; Durham, NC | W 40–0 | 12,076 | |
| September 25 | | Richmond | | Duke Stadium; Durham, NC | W 61–0 | 7,415 | |
| October 2 | | North Carolina Pre-Flight* | | Duke Stadium; Durham, NC | W 42–0 | 6,179 | |
| October 9 | | vs. No. 4 Navy* | No. 5 | Municipal Stadium; Baltimore, MD | L 13–14 | 55,600 | |
| October 16 | | North Carolina^{†} | No. 6 | Duke Stadium; Durham, NC | W 14–7 | 32,000 | |
| October 30 | | at Georgia Tech* | No. 8 | Grant Field; Atlanta, GA | W 14–7 | 30,000 | |
| November 6 | | at NC State | No. 9 | Riddick Stadium; Raleigh, NC (rivalry) | W 75–0 | 6,000 | |
| November 13 | | Virginia* | No. 7 | Duke Stadium; Durham, NC | W 49–0 | 6,000 | |
| November 20 | | at North Carolina | No. 6 | Kenan Memorial Stadium; Chapel Hill, NC (rivalry) | W 27–6 | 27,000 | |
*Non-conference game; ^{†}Homecoming; Rankings from AP Poll released prior to the game; All times are in Eastern time

== Rankings ==
Ranking movements Legend: ██ Increase in ranking ██ Decrease in ranking ( ) = First-place votes
| | Week | | | | | | | | |
| Poll | 1 | 2 | 3 | 4 | 5 | 6 | 7 | 8 | Final |
|---|---|---|---|---|---|---|---|---|---|
| AP | 5 (4) | 6 | 9 | 8 | 9 | 7 | 6 (1) | 5 (2) | 7 (7) |
