= 1943 Great Lakes Navy Bluejackets football team =

American college football season

1943 Great Lakes Navy Bluejackets football
- Conference: Independent

Ranking
- AP: No. 6
- Record: 10–2
- Head coach: Tony Hinkle (2nd season)
- Home stadium: Ross Field

1943 military service football records
| | Conf. | | | Overall |
| Team | W | L | T | W | | L | | T |
|---|---|---|---|---|---|---|---|---|
| No. 17 Bainbridge | | – | | 7 | – | 0 | – | 0 |
| Bunker Hill NAS | | – | | 6 | – | 0 | – | 0 |
| Greensboro | | – | | 4 | – | 0 | – | 0 |
| Memphis NATTC | | – | | 2 | – | 0 | – | 0 |
| No. 2 Iowa Pre-Flight | | – | | 9 | – | 1 | – | 0 |
| No. 10 March Field | | – | | 9 | – | 1 | – | 0 |
| No. 8 Del Monte Pre-Flight | | – | | 7 | – | 1 | – | 0 |
| Randolph Field | | – | | 9 | – | 1 | – | 1 |
| Georgia Pre-Flight | | – | | 5 | – | 1 | – | 0 |
| No. 6 Great Lakes Navy | | – | | 10 | – | 2 | – | 0 |
| Lubbock AAF | | – | | 5 | – | 1 | – | 0 |
| Ottumwa NAS | | – | | 5 | – | 1 | – | 0 |
| Camp Davis | | – | | 8 | – | 2 | – | 0 |
| Sampson NTS | | – | | 7 | – | 2 | – | 0 |
| San Diego NTS | | – | | 7 | – | 2 | – | 0 |
| Keesler Field | | – | | 3 | – | 1 | – | 0 |
| Wright Field | | – | | 1 | – | 0 | – | 1 |
| Camp Lejeune | | – | | 6 | – | 2 | – | 1 |
| Fort Riley | | – | | 6 | – | 2 | – | 1 |
| Kearns Field | | – | | 5 | – | 2 | – | 0 |
| Fort Knox | | – | | 4 | – | 2 | – | 0 |
| Cherry Point Marines | | – | | 4 | – | 2 | – | 1 |
| Alameda Coast Guard | | – | | 4 | – | 2 | – | 1 |
| Fort Douglas | | – | | 4 | – | 2 | – | 1 |
| 300th Infantry | | – | | 5 | – | 3 | – | 0 |
| 176th Infantry | | – | | 4 | – | 3 | – | 0 |
| Blackland AAF | | – | | 4 | – | 3 | – | 0 |
| Fort Sheridan | | – | | 4 | – | 3 | – | 0 |
| Fort Warren | | – | | 4 | – | 3 | – | 0 |
| Norman NAS | | – | | 4 | – | 3 | – | 0 |
| Charleston Coast Guard | | – | | 5 | – | 4 | – | 0 |
| Salt Lake AAB | | – | | 4 | – | 3 | – | 2 |
| 124th Infantry | | – | | 2 | – | 2 | – | 0 |
| Camp Kilmer | | – | | 2 | – | 2 | – | 0 |
| Camp Lee | | – | | 5 | – | 5 | – | 0 |
| Logan Navy | | – | | 2 | – | 2 | – | 0 |
| Spokane Air Service | | – | | 2 | – | 2 | – | 0 |
| Camp Edwards | | – | | 4 | – | 5 | – | 0 |
| Curtis Bay Coast Guard | | – | | 4 | – | 5 | – | 0 |
| Saint Mary's Pre-Flight | | – | | 3 | – | 4 | – | 1 |
| Jacksonville NATTC | | – | | 3 | – | 4 | – | 0 |
| Richmond AAB | | – | | 4 | – | 6 | – | 1 |
| Atlantic City NAS | | – | | 2 | – | 3 | – | 0 |
| North Carolina Pre-Flight | | – | | 2 | – | 4 | – | 1 |
| Patterson Field | | – | | 2 | – | 4 | – | 1 |
| Bowman Field | | – | | 2 | – | 4 | – | 0 |
| Kirtland Field | | – | | 1 | – | 2 | – | 0 |
| Lakehurst NAS | | – | | 2 | – | 4 | – | 0 |
| Camp Grant | | – | | 2 | – | 6 | – | 2 |
| Lowry Field | | – | | 1 | – | 3 | – | 0 |
| Fort Monroe | | – | | 3 | – | 7 | – | 0 |
| Daniel Field | | – | | 2 | – | 7 | – | 0 |
| Camp Gordon | | – | | 1 | – | 4 | – | 0 |
| South Plains AAF | | – | | 1 | – | 4 | – | 0 |
| Greenville AAB | | – | | 1 | – | 5 | – | 0 |
| Ward Island Marines | | – | | 1 | – | 5 | – | 0 |
| Bryan AAF | | – | | 1 | – | 6 | – | 0 |
| Pocatello AAB | | – | | 0 | – | 3 | – | 0 |
| Norfolk Fleet Marines | | – | | 0 | – | 9 | – | 0 |
Rankings from AP Poll

The 1943 Great Lakes Navy Bluejackets football team represented the United States Navy's Great Lakes Naval Training Station (Great Lakes NTS) during the 1943 college football season. The team compiled a 10–2 record, outscored opponents by a total of 257 to 108, and was ranked No. 6 in the final AP poll. Tony Hinkle, who coached at Butler University before the war, was in his second season as head coach.

The Bluejackets played multiple games against teams that were ranked in the final AP Poll, including an upset of national champion Notre Dame in the final game of the season. The team's two losses were to Purdue and Northwestern, which finished the season ranked No. 5 and No 9, respectively, in the final AP Poll.

In the final Litkenhous Ratings, Great Lakes Navy ranked seventh among the nation's college and service teams with a rating of 112.3.

== Schedule ==
| Date | Opponent | Rank | Site | Result | Attendance | Source |
|---|---|---|---|---|---|---|
| September 12 | Fort Riley | | Ross Field; Great Lakes, IL | W 20–19 | 15,000 | |
| September 18 | Purdue | | Ross Field; Great Lakes, IL | L 13–23 | 22,000 | |
| September 25 | Iowa | | Ross Field; Great Lakes, IL | W 21–7 | | |
| October 2 | Pittsburgh | | Ross Field; Great Lakes, IL | W 40–0 | 22,000 | |
| October 9 | No. 18 Ohio State | No. 12 | Ross Field; Great Lakes, IL | W 13–6 | 22,000 | |
| October 16 | at Northwestern | No. 14 | Dyche Stadium; Evanston, IL | L 0–13 | 35,000 | |
| October 24 | at Marquette | | Marquette Stadium; Milwaukee WI | W 41–7 | 15,000 | |
| October 30 | at Western Michigan | No. 18 | Waldo Stadium; Kalamazoo, MI | W 32–6 | 9,500 | |
| November 6 | Camp Grant | | Ross Field; Great Lakes, IL | W 12–0 | 20,000 | |
| November 13 | at Indiana | | Memorial Stadium; Bloomington, IN | W 21–7 | 7,500 | |
| November 20 | Marquette | | Ross Field; Great Lakes, IL | W 25–6 | 22,000 | |
| November 27 | vs. No. 1 Notre Dame | | Ross Field; Great Lakes, IL | W 19–14 | 23,000 | |
Rankings from AP Poll released prior to the game

== Rankings ==
Ranking movements Legend: ██ Increase in ranking ██ Decrease in ranking — = Not ranked ( ) = First-place votes
| | Week | | | | | | | | |
| Poll | 1 | 2 | 3 | 4 | 5 | 6 | 7 | 8 | Final |
|---|---|---|---|---|---|---|---|---|---|
| AP | 12 | 14 | — | 18 | — | — | — | — | 6 (1) |
