= 1943 Bainbridge Commodores football team =

American college football season

1943 Bainbridge Commodores football
- Conference: Independent

Ranking
- AP: No. 17
- Record: 7–0
- Head coach: Joe Maniaci (1st season)

1943 military service football records
	Conf.			Overall
Team	W	L	T	W		L		T
No. 17 Bainbridge		–		7	–	0	–	0
Bunker Hill NAS		–		6	–	0	–	0
Greensboro		–		4	–	0	–	0
Memphis NATTC		–		2	–	0	–	0
No. 2 Iowa Pre-Flight		–		9	–	1	–	0
No. 10 March Field		–		9	–	1	–	0
No. 8 Del Monte Pre-Flight		–		7	–	1	–	0
Randolph Field		–		9	–	1	–	1
Georgia Pre-Flight		–		5	–	1	–	0
No. 6 Great Lakes Navy		–		10	–	2	–	0
Lubbock AAF		–		5	–	1	–	0
Ottumwa NAS		–		5	–	1	–	0
Camp Davis		–		8	–	2	–	0
Sampson NTS		–		7	–	2	–	0
San Diego NTS		–		7	–	2	–	0
Keesler Field		–		3	–	1	–	0
Wright Field		–		1	–	0	–	1
Camp Lejeune		–		6	–	2	–	1
Fort Riley		–		6	–	2	–	1
Kearns Field		–		5	–	2	–	0
Fort Knox		–		4	–	2	–	0
Cherry Point Marines		–		4	–	2	–	1
Alameda Coast Guard		–		4	–	2	–	1
Fort Douglas		–		4	–	2	–	1
300th Infantry		–		5	–	3	–	0
176th Infantry		–		4	–	3	–	0
Blackland AAF		–		4	–	3	–	0
Fort Sheridan		–		4	–	3	–	0
Fort Warren		–		4	–	3	–	0
Norman NAS		–		4	–	3	–	0
Charleston Coast Guard		–		5	–	4	–	0
Salt Lake AAB		–		4	–	3	–	2
124th Infantry		–		2	–	2	–	0
Camp Kilmer		–		2	–	2	–	0
Camp Lee		–		5	–	5	–	0
Logan Navy		–		2	–	2	–	0
Spokane Air Service		–		2	–	2	–	0
Camp Edwards		–		4	–	5	–	0
Curtis Bay Coast Guard		–		4	–	5	–	0
Saint Mary's Pre-Flight		–		3	–	4	–	1
Jacksonville NATTC		–		3	–	4	–	0
Richmond AAB		–		4	–	6	–	1
Atlantic City NAS		–		2	–	3	–	0
North Carolina Pre-Flight		–		2	–	4	–	1
Patterson Field		–		2	–	4	–	1
Bowman Field		–		2	–	4	–	0
Kirtland Field		–		1	–	2	–	0
Lakehurst NAS		–		2	–	4	–	0
Camp Grant		–		2	–	6	–	2
Lowry Field		–		1	–	3	–	0
Fort Monroe		–		3	–	7	–	0
Daniel Field		–		2	–	7	–	0
Camp Gordon		–		1	–	4	–	0
South Plains AAF		–		1	–	4	–	0
Greenville AAB		–		1	–	5	–	0
Ward Island Marines		–		1	–	5	–	0
Bryan AAF		–		1	–	6	–	0
Pocatello AAB		–		0	–	3	–	0
Norfolk Fleet Marines		–		0	–	9	–	0
Rankings from AP Poll

The 1943 Bainbridge Naval Training Station Commodores football team represented the United States Naval Training Center Bainbridge, Maryland during the 1943 college football season. The team compiled a 7–0 record, outscored opponents by a total of 313 to 7, and was ranked No. 17 in the final AP poll. Joe Maniaci was the team's head coach.

In the final Litkenhous Ratings, Bainbridge ranked 24th among the nation's college and service teams with a rating of 94.7.

== Schedule ==
Date	Time	Opponent	Rank	Site	Result	Attendance	Source
September 25		at Camp Lejeune		New River, NC	W 9–0		
October 9		at Fort Monroe		Fort Monroe, VA	W 57–0		
October 16	2:30 p.m.	Curtis Bay Coast Guard		Bainbridge, MD	W 26–7		
October 24	2:00 p.m.	at Camp Lee		Lee Field; Camp Lee, VA	W 49–0	12,000	
October 31		Philadelphia Yellowjackets		Bainbridge, MD	W 72–0	> 10,000	
November 6		Curtis Bay Coast Guard		Bainbridge, MD	W 54–0		
November 13		Maryland		Bainbridge, MD	W 46–0	10,000	
Rankings from AP Poll released prior to the game; All times are in Eastern time

== Rankings ==
Ranking movements Legend: ██ Increase in ranking ██ Decrease in ranking — = Not ranked т = Tied with team above or below
	Week								
Poll	1	2	3	4	5	6	7	8	Final
AP	—	—	—	—	—	—	17т	15	17

== Roster ==
Bainbridge's 1943 roster was loaded with star players from the college and professional ranks. Its backfield included:

- Charlie Justice, halfback, who was later a two-time All-American at North Carolina, played four years in the NFL, and was inducted into the College Football Hall of Fame;
- Bill DeCorrevont, back, later played five years in the NFL;
- Harvey Johnson, fullback who later played five years of professional football and coached the Buffalo Bills;
- Hilliard Cheatham, back out of Auburn; and
- Don Durdan, back out of Oregon State.

Its line included:

- Buster Ramsey, guard, an All-American at William & Mary in 1942 who was later inducted into the College Football Hall of Fame, and who also played in the NFL and was named to the NFL 1940s All-Decade Team;
- Len Akin guard, played for the Chicago Bears in 1942;
- Red Hickey, end, played for the Pittsburgh Steelers in 1941 and later coached the San Francisco 49ers;
- Lou Sossamon, who went on to play for the New York Yankees;
- Phil Ragazzo, who played in the NFL from 1938 to 1941;
- Woody Gerber, who played for the Philadelphia Eagles in 1941 and 1942;
- Carl Tomasello, end, played for the New York Giants in 1941;
- Clure Mosher, center, played for the Pittsburgh Steelers in 1942; and
- Carl Mulleneaux, end, played for the Green Bay Packers in 1942.
