= 1943 Del Monte Pre-Flight Navyators football team =

American college football season

1943 Del Monte Pre-Flight Navyators football
- Conference: Independent

Ranking
- AP: No. 8
- Record: 7–1
- Head coach: Bill Kern (1st season)
- Home stadium: Kezar Stadium

1943 military service football records
	Conf.			Overall
Team	W	L	T	W		L		T
No. 17 Bainbridge		–		7	–	0	–	0
Bunker Hill NAS		–		6	–	0	–	0
Greensboro		–		4	–	0	–	0
Memphis NATTC		–		2	–	0	–	0
No. 2 Iowa Pre-Flight		–		9	–	1	–	0
No. 10 March Field		–		9	–	1	–	0
No. 8 Del Monte Pre-Flight		–		7	–	1	–	0
Randolph Field		–		9	–	1	–	1
Georgia Pre-Flight		–		5	–	1	–	0
No. 6 Great Lakes Navy		–		10	–	2	–	0
Lubbock AAF		–		5	–	1	–	0
Ottumwa NAS		–		5	–	1	–	0
Camp Davis		–		8	–	2	–	0
Sampson NTS		–		7	–	2	–	0
San Diego NTS		–		7	–	2	–	0
Keesler Field		–		3	–	1	–	0
Wright Field		–		1	–	0	–	1
Camp Lejeune		–		6	–	2	–	1
Fort Riley		–		6	–	2	–	1
Kearns Field		–		5	–	2	–	0
Fort Knox		–		4	–	2	–	0
Cherry Point Marines		–		4	–	2	–	1
Alameda Coast Guard		–		4	–	2	–	1
Fort Douglas		–		4	–	2	–	1
300th Infantry		–		5	–	3	–	0
176th Infantry		–		4	–	3	–	0
Blackland AAF		–		4	–	3	–	0
Fort Sheridan		–		4	–	3	–	0
Fort Warren		–		4	–	3	–	0
Norman NAS		–		4	–	3	–	0
Charleston Coast Guard		–		5	–	4	–	0
Salt Lake AAB		–		4	–	3	–	2
124th Infantry		–		2	–	2	–	0
Camp Kilmer		–		2	–	2	–	0
Camp Lee		–		5	–	5	–	0
Logan Navy		–		2	–	2	–	0
Spokane Air Service		–		2	–	2	–	0
Camp Edwards		–		4	–	5	–	0
Curtis Bay Coast Guard		–		4	–	5	–	0
Saint Mary's Pre-Flight		–		3	–	4	–	1
Jacksonville NATTC		–		3	–	4	–	0
Richmond AAB		–		4	–	6	–	1
Atlantic City NAS		–		2	–	3	–	0
North Carolina Pre-Flight		–		2	–	4	–	1
Patterson Field		–		2	–	4	–	1
Bowman Field		–		2	–	4	–	0
Kirtland Field		–		1	–	2	–	0
Lakehurst NAS		–		2	–	4	–	0
Camp Grant		–		2	–	6	–	2
Lowry Field		–		1	–	3	–	0
Fort Monroe		–		3	–	7	–	0
Daniel Field		–		2	–	7	–	0
Camp Gordon		–		1	–	4	–	0
South Plains AAF		–		1	–	4	–	0
Greenville AAB		–		1	–	5	–	0
Ward Island Marines		–		1	–	5	–	0
Bryan AAF		–		1	–	6	–	0
Pocatello AAB		–		0	–	3	–	0
Norfolk Fleet Marines		–		0	–	9	–	0
Rankings from AP Poll

The 1943 Del Monte Pre-Flight Seahawks football team represented the United States Navy's Del Monte Pre-Flight School during the 1943 college football season. The school was located at the Hotel Del Monte in Del Monte, California (annexed in 1948 into Monterey, California), The team compiled a 7–1 record, outscored opponents by a total of 252 to 65, and was ranked No. 8 in the final AP poll.

Bill Kern, who had been the head coach at Carnegie Tech and West Virginia prior to the war, was the team's head coach. The team included a number of athletes who were then serving in the Navy. Notable players include: Paul Christman, an All-American quarterback at Missouri; Parker Hall, an All-American back out of Ole Miss who played in the NFL from 1939 to 1942; Len Eshmont, a back who played in the NFL in 1941; Ed Cifers, an end who played in the NFL from 1941 to 1942; Bowden Wyatt, an end out of Tennessee; and Jim McDonald, a back who played in the NFL from 1938 to 1939.

In the final Litkenhous Ratings, Del Monte Pre-Flight ranked 20th among the nation's college and service teams with a rating of 96.8.

== Schedule ==
Date	Opponent	Rank	Site	Result	Attendance	Source
September 26	Alameda Coast Guard		Kezar Stadium; San Francisco, CA	W 34–7	10,000	
October 3	Saint Mary's		Kezar Stadium; San Francisco, CA	W 33–7	25,000	
October 10	Pleasanton Naval Distribution Center	No. 15	Del Monte, CA	W 34–6	6,000	
October 16	at No. 10 Pacific (CA)	No. 11	Baxter Field; Stockton, CA	L 7–16	10,000	
October 24	at San Francisco	No. 15	Kezar Stadium; San Francisco, CA	W 34–0	10,000	
November 6	at UCLA	No. 14	Los Angeles Memorial Coliseum; Los Angeles CA	W 26–7	15,000	
November 21	at St. Mary's Pre-Flight	No. 14	Kezar Stadium; San Francisco, CA	W 37–14	45,000	
November 27	at California	No. 10	Memorial Stadium; Berkeley, CA	W 47–8	10,000–12,000	
Rankings from AP Poll released prior to the game

== Rankings ==
Ranking movements Legend: ██ Increase in ranking ██ Decrease in ranking ( ) = First-place votes
	Week								
Poll	1	2	3	4	5	6	7	8	Final
AP	15	11 (6)	15	17	14	13	14	10	8 (9)
