= 1943 Fort Riley Centaurs football team =

American college football season

1943 Fort Riley Centaurs football
- Conference: Independent
- Record: 6–2–1
- Head coach: Fran Welch (1st season)

1943 military service football records
	Conf.			Overall
Team	W	L	T	W		L		T
No. 17 Bainbridge		–		7	–	0	–	0
Bunker Hill NAS		–		6	–	0	–	0
Greensboro		–		4	–	0	–	0
Memphis NATTC		–		2	–	0	–	0
No. 2 Iowa Pre-Flight		–		9	–	1	–	0
No. 10 March Field		–		9	–	1	–	0
No. 8 Del Monte Pre-Flight		–		7	–	1	–	0
Randolph Field		–		9	–	1	–	1
Georgia Pre-Flight		–		5	–	1	–	0
No. 6 Great Lakes Navy		–		10	–	2	–	0
Lubbock AAF		–		5	–	1	–	0
Ottumwa NAS		–		5	–	1	–	0
Camp Davis		–		8	–	2	–	0
Sampson NTS		–		7	–	2	–	0
San Diego NTS		–		7	–	2	–	0
Keesler Field		–		3	–	1	–	0
Wright Field		–		1	–	0	–	1
Camp Lejeune		–		6	–	2	–	1
Fort Riley		–		6	–	2	–	1
Kearns Field		–		5	–	2	–	0
Fort Knox		–		4	–	2	–	0
Cherry Point Marines		–		4	–	2	–	1
Alameda Coast Guard		–		4	–	2	–	1
Fort Douglas		–		4	–	2	–	1
300th Infantry		–		5	–	3	–	0
176th Infantry		–		4	–	3	–	0
Blackland AAF		–		4	–	3	–	0
Fort Sheridan		–		4	–	3	–	0
Fort Warren		–		4	–	3	–	0
Norman NAS		–		4	–	3	–	0
Charleston Coast Guard		–		5	–	4	–	0
Salt Lake AAB		–		4	–	3	–	2
124th Infantry		–		2	–	2	–	0
Camp Kilmer		–		2	–	2	–	0
Camp Lee		–		5	–	5	–	0
Logan Navy		–		2	–	2	–	0
Spokane Air Service		–		2	–	2	–	0
Camp Edwards		–		4	–	5	–	0
Curtis Bay Coast Guard		–		4	–	5	–	0
Saint Mary's Pre-Flight		–		3	–	4	–	1
Jacksonville NATTC		–		3	–	4	–	0
Richmond AAB		–		4	–	6	–	1
Atlantic City NAS		–		2	–	3	–	0
North Carolina Pre-Flight		–		2	–	4	–	1
Patterson Field		–		2	–	4	–	1
Bowman Field		–		2	–	4	–	0
Kirtland Field		–		1	–	2	–	0
Lakehurst NAS		–		2	–	4	–	0
Camp Grant		–		2	–	6	–	2
Lowry Field		–		1	–	3	–	0
Fort Monroe		–		3	–	7	–	0
Daniel Field		–		2	–	7	–	0
Camp Gordon		–		1	–	4	–	0
South Plains AAF		–		1	–	4	–	0
Greenville AAB		–		1	–	5	–	0
Ward Island Marines		–		1	–	5	–	0
Bryan AAF		–		1	–	6	–	0
Pocatello AAB		–		0	–	3	–	0
Norfolk Fleet Marines		–		0	–	9	–	0
Rankings from AP Poll

The 1943 Fort Riley Centaurs football team represented the Cavalry Replacement Training Center at Fort Riley, a United States Army installation located in North Central Kansas, as an independent during the 1943 college football season. The team compiled a 6–2–1 record and outscored opponents by a total of 226 to 92.

Fran Welch was the team's head coach. Players included Reino Nori (quarterback, Chicago Bears), Bernie Ruman (halfback, Arizona), Bob Ruman (quarterback/halfback), Keith Caywood, Bennie Sheridan, Corwin Clatt (fullback), Leonard Klusman, Daniel Carmichael, Bobby Ford (halfback, Mississippi State), Paul Duhart, Clifton Patton (guard), Sam Goldman, Bob Balaban (end), and George Wendall.

In the final Litkenhous Ratings, Fort Riley ranked 15th among the nation's college and service teams with a rating of 100.7.

== Schedule ==
Date	Opponent	Site	Result	Attendance	Source
September 12	at Great Lakes Navy	Ross Field; Great Lakes, IL	L 19–20	15,000	
September 25	Lowry Field	Fort Riley, KS	W 60–20	10,000	
October 9	Norman NAS	Fort Riley, KS	W 39–0	1,500	
October 16	at Denver	Denver, CO	W 47–0	5,000	
October 23	No. 20 Camp Grant	Fort Riley, KS	T 13–13	10,000	
October 30	at No. 9 Iowa Pre-Flight	Iowa Stadium; Iowa City, IA	L 2–19	< 3,500	
November 13	Fort Warren	Memorial Stadium; Manhattan, KS	W 14–7	2,500	
November 20	at Camp Grant	Rockford, IL	W 10–6	7,000	
November 25	Kansas	Junction City, KS	W 22–7	4,000	
Rankings from AP Poll released prior to the game
