= 1943 Maryland Terrapins football team =

American college football season

1943 Maryland Terrapins football
- Conference: Southern Conference
- Record: 4–5 (2–0 SoCon)
- Head coach: Clarence Spears (1st season)
- Home stadium: Byrd Stadium (original)

1943 Southern Conference football standings
	Conf.					Overall
Team	W		L		T	W		L		T
No. 7 Duke $	4	–	0	–	0	8	–	1	–	0
Maryland	2	–	0	–	0	4	–	5	–	0
South Carolina	2	–	1	–	0	5	–	2	–	0
Wake Forest	3	–	2	–	0	4	–	5	–	0
North Carolina	2	–	2	–	0	6	–	3	–	0
Richmond	1	–	1	–	0	6	–	1	–	0
Clemson	2	–	3	–	0	2	–	6	–	0
VMI	2	–	3	–	0	2	–	6	–	0
NC State	1	–	4	–	0	3	–	6	–	0
Davidson	0	–	3	–	0	0	–	5	–	0
$ – Conference champion; Rankings from AP Poll

The 1943 Maryland Terrapins football team represented the University of Maryland in the 1943 college football season. In their first season under head coach Clarence Spears, the Terrapins compiled a 4–5 record (2–0 in conference), finished in second place in the Southern Conference, and were outscored by their opponents 194 to 105.

In the final Litkenhous Ratings, Maryland ranked 154th among the nation's college and service teams with a rating of 52.0.

== Schedule ==
Date	Time	Opponent	Site	Result	Attendance	Source
September 25		Curtis Bay Coast Guard*	Byrd Stadium; College Park, MD	L 7–13	2,000	
October 2		Wake Forest	Byrd Stadium; College Park, MD	W 13–7	1,000	
October 9	2:30 p.m.	Richmond AAB*	Byrd Stadium; College Park, MD	W 19–6	1,500	
October 16		at West Virginia*	Mountaineer Field; Morgantown, WV (rivalry)	L 2–6		
October 23		Penn State*	Byrd Stadium; College Park, MD (rivalry)	L 0–45	5,000	
October 30	3:00 p.m.	at Greenville AAB*	Sirrine Stadium; Greenville, SC	W 43–18	3,500	
November 6		at Virginia*	Scott Stadium; Charlottesville, VA (rivalry)	L 0–39	4,000	
November 13		at Bainbridge*	Bainbridge, MD	L 0–46	10,000	
November 25		at VMI	Victory Stadium; Roanoke, VA	W 21–14	7,000	
*Non-conference game; All times are in Eastern time
