= 1943 Sampson Naval Training Station Bluejackets football team =

American college football season

1943 Sampson Naval Training Station Bluejackets football
- Conference: Independent
- Record: 7–2
- Head coach: Mal Stevens (1st season)

1943 military service football records
	Conf.			Overall
Team	W	L	T	W		L		T
No. 17 Bainbridge		–		7	–	0	–	0
Bunker Hill NAS		–		6	–	0	–	0
Greensboro		–		4	–	0	–	0
Memphis NATTC		–		2	–	0	–	0
No. 2 Iowa Pre-Flight		–		9	–	1	–	0
No. 10 March Field		–		9	–	1	–	0
No. 8 Del Monte Pre-Flight		–		7	–	1	–	0
Randolph Field		–		9	–	1	–	1
Georgia Pre-Flight		–		5	–	1	–	0
No. 6 Great Lakes Navy		–		10	–	2	–	0
Lubbock AAF		–		5	–	1	–	0
Ottumwa NAS		–		5	–	1	–	0
Camp Davis		–		8	–	2	–	0
Sampson NTS		–		7	–	2	–	0
San Diego NTS		–		7	–	2	–	0
Keesler Field		–		3	–	1	–	0
Wright Field		–		1	–	0	–	1
Camp Lejeune		–		6	–	2	–	1
Fort Riley		–		6	–	2	–	1
Kearns Field		–		5	–	2	–	0
Fort Knox		–		4	–	2	–	0
Cherry Point Marines		–		4	–	2	–	1
Alameda Coast Guard		–		4	–	2	–	1
Fort Douglas		–		4	–	2	–	1
300th Infantry		–		5	–	3	–	0
176th Infantry		–		4	–	3	–	0
Blackland AAF		–		4	–	3	–	0
Fort Sheridan		–		4	–	3	–	0
Fort Warren		–		4	–	3	–	0
Norman NAS		–		4	–	3	–	0
Charleston Coast Guard		–		5	–	4	–	0
Salt Lake AAB		–		4	–	3	–	2
124th Infantry		–		2	–	2	–	0
Camp Kilmer		–		2	–	2	–	0
Camp Lee		–		5	–	5	–	0
Logan Navy		–		2	–	2	–	0
Spokane Air Service		–		2	–	2	–	0
Camp Edwards		–		4	–	5	–	0
Curtis Bay Coast Guard		–		4	–	5	–	0
Saint Mary's Pre-Flight		–		3	–	4	–	1
Jacksonville NATTC		–		3	–	4	–	0
Richmond AAB		–		4	–	6	–	1
Atlantic City NAS		–		2	–	3	–	0
North Carolina Pre-Flight		–		2	–	4	–	1
Patterson Field		–		2	–	4	–	1
Bowman Field		–		2	–	4	–	0
Kirtland Field		–		1	–	2	–	0
Lakehurst NAS		–		2	–	4	–	0
Camp Grant		–		2	–	6	–	2
Lowry Field		–		1	–	3	–	0
Fort Monroe		–		3	–	7	–	0
Daniel Field		–		2	–	7	–	0
Camp Gordon		–		1	–	4	–	0
South Plains AAF		–		1	–	4	–	0
Greenville AAB		–		1	–	5	–	0
Ward Island Marines		–		1	–	5	–	0
Bryan AAF		–		1	–	6	–	0
Pocatello AAB		–		0	–	3	–	0
Norfolk Fleet Marines		–		0	–	9	–	0
Rankings from AP Poll

The 1943 Sampson Naval Training Station Bluejackets football team, also called the "Sailors", represented United States Navy's Sampson Naval Training Station (Sampton NTS), located in Seneca County, New York, during the 1943 college football season. Led by head coach Mal Stevens, the Bluejackets compiled a record of 7–2. The team's roster included Joe Davis and Dom Principe.

In the final Litkenhous Ratings, Sampson NTS ranked 84th among the nation's college and service teams with a rating of 70.9.

== Schedule ==
Date	Time	Opponent	Site	Result	Attendance	Source
September 25		at Cornell	Schoellkopf Field; Ithaca, NY	L 13–27	6,000	
October 3		Philadelphia Yellowjackets	Sampson, NY	W 47–7		
October 10	2:30 p.m.	at Villanova	Shibe Park; Philadelphia, PA	W 17–7	8,000–10,000	
October 17		Rome AAB	Sampson, NY	W 47–0	12,000	
October 23		at RPI	Troy, NY	W 7–0		
October 31		at Rome AAB	Rome, NY	W 48–7	1,500	
November 7		York Vikings	Sampson, NY	W 55–0		
November 13	2:45 p.m.	at No. 6 Army	Michie Stadium; West Point, NY	L 7–16	8,000	
November 20	2:00 p.m.	at Muhlenberg	Muhlenberg Field; Allentown, PA	W 28–7	3,000–4,000	
Rankings from AP Poll released prior to the game; All times are in Eastern time
