= 1943 Camp Grant Warriors football team =

American college football season

1943 Camp Grant Warriors football
- Conference: Independent
- Record: 2–6–2
- Head coach: Charlie Bachman (1st season)
- Captain: Coomer (left tackle)
- Home stadium: Rockford HS Stadium

1943 military service football records
	Conf.			Overall
Team	W	L	T	W		L		T
No. 17 Bainbridge		–		7	–	0	–	0
Bunker Hill NAS		–		6	–	0	–	0
Greensboro		–		4	–	0	–	0
Memphis NATTC		–		2	–	0	–	0
No. 2 Iowa Pre-Flight		–		9	–	1	–	0
No. 10 March Field		–		9	–	1	–	0
No. 8 Del Monte Pre-Flight		–		7	–	1	–	0
Randolph Field		–		9	–	1	–	1
Georgia Pre-Flight		–		5	–	1	–	0
No. 6 Great Lakes Navy		–		10	–	2	–	0
Lubbock AAF		–		5	–	1	–	0
Ottumwa NAS		–		5	–	1	–	0
Camp Davis		–		8	–	2	–	0
Sampson NTS		–		7	–	2	–	0
San Diego NTS		–		7	–	2	–	0
Keesler Field		–		3	–	1	–	0
Wright Field		–		1	–	0	–	1
Camp Lejeune		–		6	–	2	–	1
Fort Riley		–		6	–	2	–	1
Kearns Field		–		5	–	2	–	0
Fort Knox		–		4	–	2	–	0
Cherry Point Marines		–		4	–	2	–	1
Alameda Coast Guard		–		4	–	2	–	1
Fort Douglas		–		4	–	2	–	1
300th Infantry		–		5	–	3	–	0
176th Infantry		–		4	–	3	–	0
Blackland AAF		–		4	–	3	–	0
Fort Sheridan		–		4	–	3	–	0
Fort Warren		–		4	–	3	–	0
Norman NAS		–		4	–	3	–	0
Charleston Coast Guard		–		5	–	4	–	0
Salt Lake AAB		–		4	–	3	–	2
124th Infantry		–		2	–	2	–	0
Camp Kilmer		–		2	–	2	–	0
Camp Lee		–		5	–	5	–	0
Logan Navy		–		2	–	2	–	0
Spokane Air Service		–		2	–	2	–	0
Camp Edwards		–		4	–	5	–	0
Curtis Bay Coast Guard		–		4	–	5	–	0
Saint Mary's Pre-Flight		–		3	–	4	–	1
Jacksonville NATTC		–		3	–	4	–	0
Richmond AAB		–		4	–	6	–	1
Atlantic City NAS		–		2	–	3	–	0
North Carolina Pre-Flight		–		2	–	4	–	1
Patterson Field		–		2	–	4	–	1
Bowman Field		–		2	–	4	–	0
Kirtland Field		–		1	–	2	–	0
Lakehurst NAS		–		2	–	4	–	0
Camp Grant		–		2	–	6	–	2
Lowry Field		–		1	–	3	–	0
Fort Monroe		–		3	–	7	–	0
Daniel Field		–		2	–	7	–	0
Camp Gordon		–		1	–	4	–	0
South Plains AAF		–		1	–	4	–	0
Greenville AAB		–		1	–	5	–	0
Ward Island Marines		–		1	–	5	–	0
Bryan AAF		–		1	–	6	–	0
Pocatello AAB		–		0	–	3	–	0
Norfolk Fleet Marines		–		0	–	9	–	0
Rankings from AP Poll

The 1943 Camp Grant Warriors football team represented Camp Grant during the 1943 college football season. Led by head coach Charlie Bachman of Michigan State, the Warriors compiled a record of 2–6–2 against a difficult schedule that included four of the top six teams in the final AP poll rankings: Iowa Pre-Flight, Michigan, Purdue, and Great Lakes Navy. They were ranked a single time by the AP, achieving the No. 20 spot with a 2–3–1 record, and were dropped the next week after a loss to No. 13 Minnesota.

In the final Litkenhous Ratings, Camp Grant Pre-Flight ranked 22nd among the nation's college and service teams with a rating of 95.6.

== Schedule ==
Date	Opponent	Rank	Site	Result	Attendance	Source
September 11	at Illinois		Memorial Stadium; Champaign, IL	W 23–0	3,500	
September 18	Michigan		Rockford HS Stadium; Rockford, IL	L 0–26	11,000	
September 25	Wisconsin		Rockford HS Stadium; Rockford, IL	W 10–7	11,000	
October 2	Marquette		Rockford HS Stadium; Rockford, IL	T 7–7	11,000	
October 9	at No. 7 Purdue		Ross–Ade Stadium; West Lafayette, IN	L 0–19	13,000	
October 16	at No. 13 Minnesota		Memorial Stadium; Minneapolis, MN	L 7–13	35,000	
October 23	at Fort Riley	No. 20	Fort Riley, KS	T 13–13	10,000	
November 6	at Great Lakes Navy		Ross Field; Great Lakes, IL	L 0–12	22,000	
November 13	at No. 5 Iowa Pre-Flight		Iowa Stadium; Iowa City, IA	L 13–28		
November 20	Fort Riley		Rockford HS Stadium; Rockford, IL (Midwest Army Championship)	L 6–10	10,000	
Rankings from AP Poll released prior to the game

== Rankings ==
Ranking movements Legend: ██ Increase in ranking ██ Decrease in ranking — = Not ranked
	Week								
Poll	1	2	3	4	5	6	7	8	Final
AP	—	—	20	—	—	—	—	—	—
