= 1943 Greenville Army Air Base Jay Birds football team =

American college football season

1943 Greenville Army Air Base Jay Birds football
- Conference: Independent
- Record: 1–5
- Head coach: Jim Thomason (1st season)
- Home stadium: Sirrine Stadium

1943 military service football records
	Conf.			Overall
Team	W	L	T	W		L		T
No. 17 Bainbridge		–		7	–	0	–	0
Bunker Hill NAS		–		6	–	0	–	0
Greensboro		–		4	–	0	–	0
Memphis NATTC		–		2	–	0	–	0
No. 2 Iowa Pre-Flight		–		9	–	1	–	0
No. 10 March Field		–		9	–	1	–	0
No. 8 Del Monte Pre-Flight		–		7	–	1	–	0
Randolph Field		–		9	–	1	–	1
Georgia Pre-Flight		–		5	–	1	–	0
No. 6 Great Lakes Navy		–		10	–	2	–	0
Lubbock AAF		–		5	–	1	–	0
Ottumwa NAS		–		5	–	1	–	0
Camp Davis		–		8	–	2	–	0
Sampson NTS		–		7	–	2	–	0
San Diego NTS		–		7	–	2	–	0
Keesler Field		–		3	–	1	–	0
Wright Field		–		1	–	0	–	1
Camp Lejeune		–		6	–	2	–	1
Fort Riley		–		6	–	2	–	1
Kearns Field		–		5	–	2	–	0
Fort Knox		–		4	–	2	–	0
Cherry Point Marines		–		4	–	2	–	1
Alameda Coast Guard		–		4	–	2	–	1
Fort Douglas		–		4	–	2	–	1
300th Infantry		–		5	–	3	–	0
176th Infantry		–		4	–	3	–	0
Blackland AAF		–		4	–	3	–	0
Fort Sheridan		–		4	–	3	–	0
Fort Warren		–		4	–	3	–	0
Norman NAS		–		4	–	3	–	0
Charleston Coast Guard		–		5	–	4	–	0
Salt Lake AAB		–		4	–	3	–	2
124th Infantry		–		2	–	2	–	0
Camp Kilmer		–		2	–	2	–	0
Camp Lee		–		5	–	5	–	0
Logan Navy		–		2	–	2	–	0
Spokane Air Service		–		2	–	2	–	0
Camp Edwards		–		4	–	5	–	0
Curtis Bay Coast Guard		–		4	–	5	–	0
Saint Mary's Pre-Flight		–		3	–	4	–	1
Jacksonville NATTC		–		3	–	4	–	0
Richmond AAB		–		4	–	6	–	1
Atlantic City NAS		–		2	–	3	–	0
North Carolina Pre-Flight		–		2	–	4	–	1
Patterson Field		–		2	–	4	–	1
Bowman Field		–		2	–	4	–	0
Kirtland Field		–		1	–	2	–	0
Lakehurst NAS		–		2	–	4	–	0
Camp Grant		–		2	–	6	–	2
Lowry Field		–		1	–	3	–	0
Fort Monroe		–		3	–	7	–	0
Daniel Field		–		2	–	7	–	0
Camp Gordon		–		1	–	4	–	0
South Plains AAF		–		1	–	4	–	0
Greenville AAB		–		1	–	5	–	0
Ward Island Marines		–		1	–	5	–	0
Bryan AAF		–		1	–	6	–	0
Pocatello AAB		–		0	–	3	–	0
Norfolk Fleet Marines		–		0	–	9	–	0
Rankings from AP Poll

The 1943 Greenville Army Air Base Jay Birds football team represented the United States Army Air Forces's 334th Bombardment Group at Greenville Army Air Base (Greenville AAB), located near Greenville, South Carolina, during the 1943 college football season. Led by head coach Jim Thomason, the Jay Birds compiled a record of 1–5.

In the final Litkenhous Ratings, Greenville AAB ranked 203rd among the nation's college and service teams with a rating of 35.6.

== Schedule ==
Date	Time	Opponent	Site	Result	Attendance	Source
October 9	8:30 p.m.	Newberry	Sirrine Stadium; Greenville, SC	L 6–28	1,000	
October 16	8:00 p.m.	Presbyterian	Sirrine Stadium; Greenville, SC	L 6–28		
October 23	3:00 p.m.	NC State	Sirrine Stadium; Greenville, SC	L 6–7	2,500	
October 30	3:00 p.m.	Maryland	Sirrine Stadium; Greenville, SC	L 18–43	4,500	
November 6	3:00 p.m.	10th Armored	Sirrine Stadium; Greenville, SC	L 6–14	2,000	
November 11	3:00 p.m.	60th Armored Infantry	Sirrine Stadium; Greenville, SC	W 20–0	7,000	
All times are in Eastern time
