= 1943 Memphis Naval Air Technical Training Center Bluejackets football team =

American college football season

1943 Memphis Naval Air Technical Training Center Bluejackets football
- Conference: Independent
- Record: 2–0
- Head coach: Denny Myers (1st season)
- Captain: Frank Filchock
- Home stadium: Crump Stadium

1943 military service football records
	Conf.			Overall
Team	W	L	T	W		L		T
No. 17 Bainbridge		–		7	–	0	–	0
Bunker Hill NAS		–		6	–	0	–	0
Greensboro		–		4	–	0	–	0
Memphis NATTC		–		2	–	0	–	0
No. 2 Iowa Pre-Flight		–		9	–	1	–	0
No. 10 March Field		–		9	–	1	–	0
No. 8 Del Monte Pre-Flight		–		7	–	1	–	0
Randolph Field		–		9	–	1	–	1
Georgia Pre-Flight		–		5	–	1	–	0
No. 6 Great Lakes Navy		–		10	–	2	–	0
Lubbock AAF		–		5	–	1	–	0
Ottumwa NAS		–		5	–	1	–	0
Camp Davis		–		8	–	2	–	0
Sampson NTS		–		7	–	2	–	0
San Diego NTS		–		7	–	2	–	0
Keesler Field		–		3	–	1	–	0
Wright Field		–		1	–	0	–	1
Camp Lejeune		–		6	–	2	–	1
Fort Riley		–		6	–	2	–	1
Kearns Field		–		5	–	2	–	0
Fort Knox		–		4	–	2	–	0
Cherry Point Marines		–		4	–	2	–	1
Alameda Coast Guard		–		4	–	2	–	1
Fort Douglas		–		4	–	2	–	1
300th Infantry		–		5	–	3	–	0
176th Infantry		–		4	–	3	–	0
Blackland AAF		–		4	–	3	–	0
Fort Sheridan		–		4	–	3	–	0
Fort Warren		–		4	–	3	–	0
Norman NAS		–		4	–	3	–	0
Charleston Coast Guard		–		5	–	4	–	0
Salt Lake AAB		–		4	–	3	–	2
124th Infantry		–		2	–	2	–	0
Camp Kilmer		–		2	–	2	–	0
Camp Lee		–		5	–	5	–	0
Logan Navy		–		2	–	2	–	0
Spokane Air Service		–		2	–	2	–	0
Camp Edwards		–		4	–	5	–	0
Curtis Bay Coast Guard		–		4	–	5	–	0
Saint Mary's Pre-Flight		–		3	–	4	–	1
Jacksonville NATTC		–		3	–	4	–	0
Richmond AAB		–		4	–	6	–	1
Atlantic City NAS		–		2	–	3	–	0
North Carolina Pre-Flight		–		2	–	4	–	1
Patterson Field		–		2	–	4	–	1
Bowman Field		–		2	–	4	–	0
Kirtland Field		–		1	–	2	–	0
Lakehurst NAS		–		2	–	4	–	0
Camp Grant		–		2	–	6	–	2
Lowry Field		–		1	–	3	–	0
Fort Monroe		–		3	–	7	–	0
Daniel Field		–		2	–	7	–	0
Camp Gordon		–		1	–	4	–	0
South Plains AAF		–		1	–	4	–	0
Greenville AAB		–		1	–	5	–	0
Ward Island Marines		–		1	–	5	–	0
Bryan AAF		–		1	–	6	–	0
Pocatello AAB		–		0	–	3	–	0
Norfolk Fleet Marines		–		0	–	9	–	0
Rankings from AP Poll

The 1943 Memphis Naval Air Technical Training Center Bluejackets football team represented the United States Navy's Memphis Naval Air Technical Training Center (Memphis NAATC), located in Millington, Tennessee during the 1943 college football season. After starting with a 2–0 record, the rest of the Memphis NAATC's games were abruptly cancelled on October 10, 1943 when the Navy ruled that the NAS could not play at Crump Stadium in Memphis, Tennessee, and so no longer had an adequate playing field to conduct the remainder of their contests. The team was ranked in the first three AP Polls of the 1943 season, but was eventually dropped from the rankings on October 25, 1943.

In the final Litkenhous Ratings, Memphis NAATC ranked tenth among the nation's college and service teams with a rating of 108.3.

== Schedule ==
Date	Opponent	Rank	Site	Result	Attendance	Source
September 26	Rosecrans Army Fliers		Memphis NAS Base; Memphis, TN	W 57–0		
October 2	Tulane		Tulane Stadium; New Orleans, LA	W 41–7	25,000	
October 9	SMU	No. 13	Ownby Stadium; University Park, TX	cancelled		
October 16	at LSU	No. 15	Tiger Stadium; Baton Rouge, LA	Cancelled		
October 23	Arkansas	No. 19	Memphis, TN	Cancelled		
October 30	at Miami (OH)		Miami Field; Oxford, OH	Cancelled		
November 6	at Texas		War Memorial Stadium; Austin, TX	Cancelled		
	Marquette		Crump Stadium; Memphis, TN	Cancelled		
	Fort Benning		Crump Stadium; Memphis, TN	Cancelled		
Rankings from AP Poll released prior to the game

== Rankings ==
Ranking movements Legend: ██ Increase in ranking ██ Decrease in ranking — = Not ranked
	Week								
Poll	1	2	3	4	5	6	7	8	Final
AP	13	15	19	—	—	—	—	—	—
