= 1943 Davidson Wildcats football team =

American college football season

1943 Davidson Wildcats football
- Conference: Southern Conference
- Record: 0–5 (0–3 SoCon)
- Head coach: Gene McEver (8th season)
- Home stadium: American Legion Memorial Stadium

1943 Southern Conference football standings
	Conf.					Overall
Team	W		L		T	W		L		T
No. 7 Duke $	4	–	0	–	0	8	–	1	–	0
Maryland	2	–	0	–	0	4	–	5	–	0
South Carolina	2	–	1	–	0	5	–	2	–	0
Wake Forest	3	–	2	–	0	4	–	5	–	0
North Carolina	2	–	2	–	0	6	–	3	–	0
Richmond	1	–	1	–	0	6	–	1	–	0
Clemson	2	–	3	–	0	2	–	6	–	0
VMI	2	–	3	–	0	2	–	6	–	0
NC State	1	–	4	–	0	3	–	6	–	0
Davidson	0	–	3	–	0	0	–	5	–	0
$ – Conference champion; Rankings from AP Poll

The 1943 Davidson Wildcats football team was an American football team that represented Davidson College during the 1943 college football season as a member of the Southern Conference. In their eighth year under head coach Gene McEver, the team compiled an overall record of 0–5, with a mark of 0–3 in conference play, and finished in last place in the SoCon.

== Schedule ==
Date	Time	Opponent	Site	Result	Attendance	Source
October 2		at VMI	Alumni Field; Lexington, VA	L 0–13	3,000	
October 16	3:00 p.m.	Charleston Coast Guard*	American Legion Memorial Stadium; Charlotte, NC	L 0–36	3,000	
October 23	2:30 p.m.	at Camp Davis*	Camp Davis, NC	L 0–27	15,000	
November 6		Clemson^{†}	American Legion Memorial Stadium; Charlotte, NC	L 6–26	4,000	
November 13		NC State	American Legion Memorial Stadium; Charlotte, NC	L 0–20	2,500	
*Non-conference game; ^{†}Homecoming; All times are in Eastern time
