= 1943 VMI Keydets football team =

American college football season

1943 VMI Keydets football
- Conference: Southern Conference
- Record: 2–6 (2–3 SoCon)
- Head coach: Pooley Hubert (7th season)
- Home stadium: Alumni Field

1943 Southern Conference football standings
	Conf.					Overall
Team	W		L		T	W		L		T
No. 7 Duke $	4	–	0	–	0	8	–	1	–	0
Maryland	2	–	0	–	0	4	–	5	–	0
South Carolina	2	–	1	–	0	5	–	2	–	0
Wake Forest	3	–	2	–	0	4	–	5	–	0
North Carolina	2	–	2	–	0	6	–	3	–	0
Richmond	1	–	1	–	0	6	–	1	–	0
Clemson	2	–	3	–	0	2	–	6	–	0
VMI	2	–	3	–	0	2	–	6	–	0
NC State	1	–	4	–	0	3	–	6	–	0
Davidson	0	–	3	–	0	0	–	5	–	0
$ – Conference champion; Rankings from AP Poll

The 1943 VMI Keydets football team was an American football team that represented the Virginia Military Institute (VMI) during the 1943 college football season as a member of the Southern Conference. In their seventh year under head coach Pooley Hubert, the team compiled an overall record of 2–6.

In the final Litkenhous Ratings, VMI ranked 180th among the nation's college and service teams with a rating of 44.5.

== Schedule ==
Date	Opponent	Site	Result	Attendance	Source
September 24	at Temple*	Temple Stadium; Philadelphia, PA	L 0–27	10,000	
October 2	Davidson	Alumni Field; Lexington, VA	W 13–0	3,000	
October 9	vs. Clemson	Victory Stadium; Roanoke, VA	W 12–7	5,000	
October 16	at Richmond	City Stadium; Richmond, VA (rivalry)	L 0–27	4,000	
October 23	vs. Wake Forest	Municipal Stadium; Lynchburg, VA	L 0–21	3,000	
October 30	Virginia*	Alumni Field; Lexington, VA	L 0–34	2,500	
November 13	vs. Georgia*	Grant Field; Atlanta, GA	L 7–46	5,000	
November 25	vs. Maryland	Victory Stadium; Roanoke, VA	L 14–21	7,000	
*Non-conference game
