= 1943 Camp Davis Fighting AA's football team =

American college football season

1943 Camp Davis Fighting AA's football
- Conference: Independent
- Record: 8–2
- Head coach: Henry A. Johnson (2nd season)
- Captain: John Mellus

1943 military service football records
	Conf.			Overall
Team	W	L	T	W		L		T
No. 17 Bainbridge		–		7	–	0	–	0
Bunker Hill NAS		–		6	–	0	–	0
Greensboro		–		4	–	0	–	0
Memphis NATTC		–		2	–	0	–	0
No. 2 Iowa Pre-Flight		–		9	–	1	–	0
No. 10 March Field		–		9	–	1	–	0
No. 8 Del Monte Pre-Flight		–		7	–	1	–	0
Randolph Field		–		9	–	1	–	1
Georgia Pre-Flight		–		5	–	1	–	0
No. 6 Great Lakes Navy		–		10	–	2	–	0
Lubbock AAF		–		5	–	1	–	0
Ottumwa NAS		–		5	–	1	–	0
Camp Davis		–		8	–	2	–	0
Sampson NTS		–		7	–	2	–	0
San Diego NTS		–		7	–	2	–	0
Keesler Field		–		3	–	1	–	0
Wright Field		–		1	–	0	–	1
Camp Lejeune		–		6	–	2	–	1
Fort Riley		–		6	–	2	–	1
Kearns Field		–		5	–	2	–	0
Fort Knox		–		4	–	2	–	0
Cherry Point Marines		–		4	–	2	–	1
Alameda Coast Guard		–		4	–	2	–	1
Fort Douglas		–		4	–	2	–	1
300th Infantry		–		5	–	3	–	0
176th Infantry		–		4	–	3	–	0
Blackland AAF		–		4	–	3	–	0
Fort Sheridan		–		4	–	3	–	0
Fort Warren		–		4	–	3	–	0
Norman NAS		–		4	–	3	–	0
Charleston Coast Guard		–		5	–	4	–	0
Salt Lake AAB		–		4	–	3	–	2
124th Infantry		–		2	–	2	–	0
Camp Kilmer		–		2	–	2	–	0
Camp Lee		–		5	–	5	–	0
Logan Navy		–		2	–	2	–	0
Spokane Air Service		–		2	–	2	–	0
Camp Edwards		–		4	–	5	–	0
Curtis Bay Coast Guard		–		4	–	5	–	0
Saint Mary's Pre-Flight		–		3	–	4	–	1
Jacksonville NATTC		–		3	–	4	–	0
Richmond AAB		–		4	–	6	–	1
Atlantic City NAS		–		2	–	3	–	0
North Carolina Pre-Flight		–		2	–	4	–	1
Patterson Field		–		2	–	4	–	1
Bowman Field		–		2	–	4	–	0
Kirtland Field		–		1	–	2	–	0
Lakehurst NAS		–		2	–	4	–	0
Camp Grant		–		2	–	6	–	2
Lowry Field		–		1	–	3	–	0
Fort Monroe		–		3	–	7	–	0
Daniel Field		–		2	–	7	–	0
Camp Gordon		–		1	–	4	–	0
South Plains AAF		–		1	–	4	–	0
Greenville AAB		–		1	–	5	–	0
Ward Island Marines		–		1	–	5	–	0
Bryan AAF		–		1	–	6	–	0
Pocatello AAB		–		0	–	3	–	0
Norfolk Fleet Marines		–		0	–	9	–	0
Rankings from AP Poll

The 1943 Camp Davis Fighting AA's football team represented the United States Army's Camp Davis near Holly Ridge, North Carolina, during the 1943 college football season. Led by head coach Henry A. Johnson, the Fighting AA's compiled a record of 8–2. Victor Dauer was an assistant coach for Camp Davis. John Mellus was the team's captain. The team's roster also included Norm Standlee.

In the final Litkenhous Ratings, Camp Davis ranked 63rd among the nation's college and service teams with a rating of 78.5.

== Schedule ==
Date	Time	Opponent	Site	Result	Attendance	Source
September 25	3:30 p.m.	Wake Forest	Camp Davis, NC	W 24–20	20,000	
October 3	3:00 p.m.	at Charleston Coast Guard	Johnson Hagood Stadium; Charleston, SC	W 25–0	7,500	
October 9	2:30 p.m.	NC State	Camp Davis, NC	W 27–0	22,000	
October 16	2:30 p.m.	at North Carolina Pre-Flight	Kenan Memorial Stadium; Chapel Hill, NC	L 18–23		
October 23	2:30 p.m.	Davidson	Camp Davis, NC	W 27–0	15,000	
October 30	2:00 p.m.	at Camp Lejeune	New River, NC	L 0–14		
November 6	2:30 p.m.	Fort Monroe	Camp Davis, NC	W 31–6	11,000	
November 13	2:30 p.m.	Presbyterian	Camp Davis, NC	W 32–0	15,000	
November 20		Daniel Field	Camp Davis, NC	W 41–0	15,000	
November 25		Fort Bragg	Camp Davis, NC	W 42–0	30,000	
All times are in Eastern time
