= 1943 North Carolina Tar Heels football team =

American college football season

1943 North Carolina Tar Heels football
- Conference: Southern Conference
- Record: 6–3 (2–2 SoCon)
- Head coach: Tom Young (1st season)
- Captain: Craven Turner
- Home stadium: Kenan Memorial Stadium

1943 Southern Conference football standings
| | Conf. | | | | | Overall |
| Team | W | | L | | T | W | | L | | T |
|---|---|---|---|---|---|---|---|---|---|---|
| No. 7 Duke $ | 4 | – | 0 | – | 0 | 8 | – | 1 | – | 0 |
| Maryland | 2 | – | 0 | – | 0 | 4 | – | 5 | – | 0 |
| South Carolina | 2 | – | 1 | – | 0 | 5 | – | 2 | – | 0 |
| Wake Forest | 3 | – | 2 | – | 0 | 4 | – | 5 | – | 0 |
| North Carolina | 2 | – | 2 | – | 0 | 6 | – | 3 | – | 0 |
| Richmond | 1 | – | 1 | – | 0 | 6 | – | 1 | – | 0 |
| Clemson | 2 | – | 3 | – | 0 | 2 | – | 6 | – | 0 |
| VMI | 2 | – | 3 | – | 0 | 2 | – | 6 | – | 0 |
| NC State | 1 | – | 4 | – | 0 | 3 | – | 6 | – | 0 |
| Davidson | 0 | – | 3 | – | 0 | 0 | – | 5 | – | 0 |
$ – Conference champion; Rankings from AP Poll

The 1943 North Carolina Tar Heels football team represented the University of North Carolina during the 1943 college football season. The Tar Heels were led by first-year head coach Tom Young and played their home games at Kenan Memorial Stadium. They competed as a member of the Southern Conference.

In the final Litkenhous Ratings, North Carolina ranked 18th among the nation's college and service teams with a rating of 97.0.

== Schedule ==
| Date | Time | Opponent | Site | Result | Attendance | Source |
|---|---|---|---|---|---|---|
| September 25 | 3:00 p.m. | at Georgia Tech* | Grant Field; Atlanta, GA | L 7–20 | 20,000 | |
| October 2 | 3:00 p.m. | Penn State* | Kenan Memorial Stadium; Chapel Hill, NC | W 19–0 | 9,983–13,500 | |
| October 9 | 3:00 p.m. | Jacksonville NATTC* | Kenan Memorial Stadium; Chapel Hill, NC | W 23–0 | 7,000 | |
| October 16 | 3:00 p.m. | at No. 6 Duke | Duke Stadium; Durham, NC (rivalry) | L 7–14 | 32,000 | |
| October 30 | 3:00 p.m. | NC State | Kenan Memorial Stadium; Chapel Hill, NC (rivalry) | W 27–13 | | |
| November 6 | 2:30 p.m. | at South Carolina | Carolina Stadium; Columbia, SC (rivalry) | W 21–6 | 8,000 | |
| November 13 | 2:00 p.m. | at No. 10 Penn* | Franklin Field; Philadelphia, PA | W 9–6 | 30,000 | |
| November 20 | 2:30 p.m. | No. 6 Duke | Kenan Memorial Stadium; Chapel Hill, NC | L 6–27 | 27,000 | |
| November 27 | 2:00 p.m. | vs. Virginia* | Foreman Field; Norfolk, VA (South's Oldest Rivalry) | W 54–7 | 15,000 | |
*Non-conference game; Rankings from AP Poll released prior to the game; All times are in Eastern time
