= 1943 Fort Warren Broncos football team =

American college football season

1943 Fort Warren Broncos football
- Conference: Independent
- Record: 4–3
- Head coach: Wee Willie Smith (1st season)
- Home stadium: Frontier Park

1943 military service football records
	Conf.			Overall
Team	W	L	T	W		L		T
No. 17 Bainbridge		–		7	–	0	–	0
Bunker Hill NAS		–		6	–	0	–	0
Greensboro		–		4	–	0	–	0
Memphis NATTC		–		2	–	0	–	0
No. 2 Iowa Pre-Flight		–		9	–	1	–	0
No. 10 March Field		–		9	–	1	–	0
No. 8 Del Monte Pre-Flight		–		7	–	1	–	0
Randolph Field		–		9	–	1	–	1
Georgia Pre-Flight		–		5	–	1	–	0
No. 6 Great Lakes Navy		–		10	–	2	–	0
Lubbock AAF		–		5	–	1	–	0
Ottumwa NAS		–		5	–	1	–	0
Camp Davis		–		8	–	2	–	0
Sampson NTS		–		7	–	2	–	0
San Diego NTS		–		7	–	2	–	0
Keesler Field		–		3	–	1	–	0
Wright Field		–		1	–	0	–	1
Camp Lejeune		–		6	–	2	–	1
Fort Riley		–		6	–	2	–	1
Kearns Field		–		5	–	2	–	0
Fort Knox		–		4	–	2	–	0
Cherry Point Marines		–		4	–	2	–	1
Alameda Coast Guard		–		4	–	2	–	1
Fort Douglas		–		4	–	2	–	1
300th Infantry		–		5	–	3	–	0
176th Infantry		–		4	–	3	–	0
Blackland AAF		–		4	–	3	–	0
Fort Sheridan		–		4	–	3	–	0
Fort Warren		–		4	–	3	–	0
Norman NAS		–		4	–	3	–	0
Charleston Coast Guard		–		5	–	4	–	0
Salt Lake AAB		–		4	–	3	–	2
124th Infantry		–		2	–	2	–	0
Camp Kilmer		–		2	–	2	–	0
Camp Lee		–		5	–	5	–	0
Logan Navy		–		2	–	2	–	0
Spokane Air Service		–		2	–	2	–	0
Camp Edwards		–		4	–	5	–	0
Curtis Bay Coast Guard		–		4	–	5	–	0
Saint Mary's Pre-Flight		–		3	–	4	–	1
Jacksonville NATTC		–		3	–	4	–	0
Richmond AAB		–		4	–	6	–	1
Atlantic City NAS		–		2	–	3	–	0
North Carolina Pre-Flight		–		2	–	4	–	1
Patterson Field		–		2	–	4	–	1
Bowman Field		–		2	–	4	–	0
Kirtland Field		–		1	–	2	–	0
Lakehurst NAS		–		2	–	4	–	0
Camp Grant		–		2	–	6	–	2
Lowry Field		–		1	–	3	–	0
Fort Monroe		–		3	–	7	–	0
Daniel Field		–		2	–	7	–	0
Camp Gordon		–		1	–	4	–	0
South Plains AAF		–		1	–	4	–	0
Greenville AAB		–		1	–	5	–	0
Ward Island Marines		–		1	–	5	–	0
Bryan AAF		–		1	–	6	–	0
Pocatello AAB		–		0	–	3	–	0
Norfolk Fleet Marines		–		0	–	9	–	0
Rankings from AP Poll

The 1943 Fort Warren Broncos football team represented the United States Army base at Fort Warren, located in Cheyenne, Wyoming, during the 1943 college football season. Led by first-year head coach Wee Willie Smith, the Broncos compiled a record of 4–3.

In the final Litkenhous Ratings, Fort Warren ranked 68th among the nation's college and service teams with a rating of 75.6.

== Schedule ==
Date	Time	Opponent	Site	Result	Attendance	Source
September 11		at Lowry Field	DU Stadium; Boulder, CO	L 0–7		
September 25		at Colorado	Colorado Stadium; Boulder, CO	L 0–38		
October 2	3:00 p.m.	at Utah	Ute Stadium; Salt Lake City, UT	W 60–0	8,000	
October 10		Kearney AAF	Frontier Park; Cheyenne, WY	W 27–6	7,000	
October 17	1:00 p.m.	at Kearney AAF	Teacher's College field; Kearney, NE	W 33–6		
October 31	2:30 p.m.	at Salt Lake AAB	Community Park; Salt Lake City, UT	W 10–0	1,500	
November 13		at Fort Riley	Memorial Stadium; Manhattan, KS	L 7–14	2,500	
November 28		Fort Douglas	Cheyenne, WY	cancelled		
All times are in Mountain time
