= 1943 300th Infantry Sabers football team =

American college football season

1943 300th Infantry Sabers football
- Conference: Independent
- Record: 5–3
- Head coach: Bob Friedlund (1st season)
- Home stadium: Doughboy Stadium

1943 military service football records
	Conf.			Overall
Team	W	L	T	W		L		T
No. 17 Bainbridge		–		7	–	0	–	0
Bunker Hill NAS		–		6	–	0	–	0
Greensboro		–		4	–	0	–	0
Memphis NATTC		–		2	–	0	–	0
No. 2 Iowa Pre-Flight		–		9	–	1	–	0
No. 10 March Field		–		9	–	1	–	0
No. 8 Del Monte Pre-Flight		–		7	–	1	–	0
Randolph Field		–		9	–	1	–	1
Georgia Pre-Flight		–		5	–	1	–	0
No. 6 Great Lakes Navy		–		10	–	2	–	0
Lubbock AAF		–		5	–	1	–	0
Ottumwa NAS		–		5	–	1	–	0
Camp Davis		–		8	–	2	–	0
Sampson NTS		–		7	–	2	–	0
San Diego NTS		–		7	–	2	–	0
Keesler Field		–		3	–	1	–	0
Wright Field		–		1	–	0	–	1
Camp Lejeune		–		6	–	2	–	1
Fort Riley		–		6	–	2	–	1
Kearns Field		–		5	–	2	–	0
Fort Knox		–		4	–	2	–	0
Cherry Point Marines		–		4	–	2	–	1
Alameda Coast Guard		–		4	–	2	–	1
Fort Douglas		–		4	–	2	–	1
300th Infantry		–		5	–	3	–	0
176th Infantry		–		4	–	3	–	0
Blackland AAF		–		4	–	3	–	0
Fort Sheridan		–		4	–	3	–	0
Fort Warren		–		4	–	3	–	0
Norman NAS		–		4	–	3	–	0
Charleston Coast Guard		–		5	–	4	–	0
Salt Lake AAB		–		4	–	3	–	2
124th Infantry		–		2	–	2	–	0
Camp Kilmer		–		2	–	2	–	0
Camp Lee		–		5	–	5	–	0
Logan Navy		–		2	–	2	–	0
Spokane Air Service		–		2	–	2	–	0
Camp Edwards		–		4	–	5	–	0
Curtis Bay Coast Guard		–		4	–	5	–	0
Saint Mary's Pre-Flight		–		3	–	4	–	1
Jacksonville NATTC		–		3	–	4	–	0
Richmond AAB		–		4	–	6	–	1
Atlantic City NAS		–		2	–	3	–	0
North Carolina Pre-Flight		–		2	–	4	–	1
Patterson Field		–		2	–	4	–	1
Bowman Field		–		2	–	4	–	0
Kirtland Field		–		1	–	2	–	0
Lakehurst NAS		–		2	–	4	–	0
Camp Grant		–		2	–	6	–	2
Lowry Field		–		1	–	3	–	0
Fort Monroe		–		3	–	7	–	0
Daniel Field		–		2	–	7	–	0
Camp Gordon		–		1	–	4	–	0
South Plains AAF		–		1	–	4	–	0
Greenville AAB		–		1	–	5	–	0
Ward Island Marines		–		1	–	5	–	0
Bryan AAF		–		1	–	6	–	0
Pocatello AAB		–		0	–	3	–	0
Norfolk Fleet Marines		–		0	–	9	–	0
Rankings from AP Poll

The 1943 300th Infantry Sabers football team represented the United States Army's 300th Infantry Regiment at Fort Benning, located near Columbus, Georgia, during the 1943 college football season. Led by head coach Bob Friedlund, the Sabers compiled a record of 5–3. The team's roster included Ermal Allen, Bill Meek, and Joe Routt.

The Sabers were scheduled to open their season on September 25 against the Millsaps Majors at Memorial Stadium in Columbus, but the game was cancelled when Millsaps College dropped football for the year.

In the final Litkenhous Ratings, the 300th Infantry ranked 30th among the nation's college and service teams with a rating of 91.6.

== Schedule ==
Date	Time	Opponent	Site	Result	Attendance	Source
September 26		Draper Prison		W 65–0		
October 3	2:00 p.m.	vs. 124th Infantry	Doughboy Stadium; Fort Benning, GA	W 19–7	18,000	
October 9		at Daniel Field	Augusta, GA	W 39–6		
October 16	3:00 p.m.	at Georgia Tech	Grant Field; Atlanta, GA	L 0–27	10,000	
October 24		vs. 176th Infantry	Doughboy Stadium; Fort Benning, GA	L 0–14	20,000	
October 31	2:00 p.m.	Daniel Field	Doughboy Stadium; Fort Benning, GA	W 47–7	18,000	
November 14	2:00 p.m.	vs. 176th Infantry	Doughboy Stadium; Fort Benning, GA	L 20–27	20,000	
November 25	3:30 p.m.	vs. Camp Gordon	Legion Field; Birmingham, AL	W 61–0	2,500	
All times are in Eastern time
