= 1943 Jacksonville Naval Air Technical Training Center Air Raiders football team =

American college football season

1943 Jacksonville Naval Air Technical Training Center Air Raiders football
- Conference: Independent
- Record: 3–4
- Head coach: Fred Frink (1st season)
- Home stadium: Cadet Field

1943 military service football records
	Conf.			Overall
Team	W	L	T	W		L		T
No. 17 Bainbridge		–		7	–	0	–	0
Bunker Hill NAS		–		6	–	0	–	0
Greensboro		–		4	–	0	–	0
Memphis NATTC		–		2	–	0	–	0
No. 2 Iowa Pre-Flight		–		9	–	1	–	0
No. 10 March Field		–		9	–	1	–	0
No. 8 Del Monte Pre-Flight		–		7	–	1	–	0
Randolph Field		–		9	–	1	–	1
Georgia Pre-Flight		–		5	–	1	–	0
No. 6 Great Lakes Navy		–		10	–	2	–	0
Lubbock AAF		–		5	–	1	–	0
Ottumwa NAS		–		5	–	1	–	0
Camp Davis		–		8	–	2	–	0
Sampson NTS		–		7	–	2	–	0
San Diego NTS		–		7	–	2	–	0
Keesler Field		–		3	–	1	–	0
Wright Field		–		1	–	0	–	1
Camp Lejeune		–		6	–	2	–	1
Fort Riley		–		6	–	2	–	1
Kearns Field		–		5	–	2	–	0
Fort Knox		–		4	–	2	–	0
Cherry Point Marines		–		4	–	2	–	1
Alameda Coast Guard		–		4	–	2	–	1
Fort Douglas		–		4	–	2	–	1
300th Infantry		–		5	–	3	–	0
176th Infantry		–		4	–	3	–	0
Blackland AAF		–		4	–	3	–	0
Fort Sheridan		–		4	–	3	–	0
Fort Warren		–		4	–	3	–	0
Norman NAS		–		4	–	3	–	0
Charleston Coast Guard		–		5	–	4	–	0
Salt Lake AAB		–		4	–	3	–	2
124th Infantry		–		2	–	2	–	0
Camp Kilmer		–		2	–	2	–	0
Camp Lee		–		5	–	5	–	0
Logan Navy		–		2	–	2	–	0
Spokane Air Service		–		2	–	2	–	0
Camp Edwards		–		4	–	5	–	0
Curtis Bay Coast Guard		–		4	–	5	–	0
Saint Mary's Pre-Flight		–		3	–	4	–	1
Jacksonville NATTC		–		3	–	4	–	0
Richmond AAB		–		4	–	6	–	1
Atlantic City NAS		–		2	–	3	–	0
North Carolina Pre-Flight		–		2	–	4	–	1
Patterson Field		–		2	–	4	–	1
Bowman Field		–		2	–	4	–	0
Kirtland Field		–		1	–	2	–	0
Lakehurst NAS		–		2	–	4	–	0
Camp Grant		–		2	–	6	–	2
Lowry Field		–		1	–	3	–	0
Fort Monroe		–		3	–	7	–	0
Daniel Field		–		2	–	7	–	0
Camp Gordon		–		1	–	4	–	0
South Plains AAF		–		1	–	4	–	0
Greenville AAB		–		1	–	5	–	0
Ward Island Marines		–		1	–	5	–	0
Bryan AAF		–		1	–	6	–	0
Pocatello AAB		–		0	–	3	–	0
Norfolk Fleet Marines		–		0	–	9	–	0
Rankings from AP Poll

The 1943 Jacksonville Naval Air Technical Training Center Air Raiders football team represented the Jacksonville Naval Air Technical Training Center (Jacksonville NATTC) during the 1944 college football season. Led by head coach Fred Frink, the Air Raiders compiled a record of 3–4.

The 1943 roster included Duke Iversen (fullback), Brad Ecklund (center), and Walt Richmond (tight end).

In the final Litkenhous Ratings, Jacksonville NATTC ranked 52nd among the nation's college and service teams with a rating of 82.6.

== Schedule ==
October 2, 1943 vs. Miami University

Date	Time	Opponent	Site	Result	Attendance	Source
September 25	2:15 p.m.	124th Infantry	Jacksonville, FL	W 13–7	5,000	
October 2	2:30 p.m.	Miami (FL)	Cadet Field; Jacksonville, FL	L 0–6	5,000	
October 9	3:00 p.m.	at North Carolina	Kenan Memorial Stadium; Chapel Hill, NC	L 0–23	7,000	
October 23	3:00 p.m.	at Camp Lejeune	New River, NC	L 7–20		
November 5	8:15 p.m.	at Miami (FL)	Burdine Stadium; Miami, FL	W 20–0	15,989	
November 13		Daniel Field	Jacksonville, FL	W 44–0	5,000	
November 27		Camp Lejeune	Jacksonville, FL	L 6–13	5,000	
All times are in Eastern time
