= 1943 Alameda Coast Guard Sea Lions football team =

American college football season

1943 Alameda Coast Guard Sea Lions football
- Conference: Independent
- Record: 4–2–1
- Head coach: Joe Verducci (2nd season)
- Home stadium: Kezar Stadium

1943 military service football records
	Conf.			Overall
Team	W	L	T	W		L		T
No. 17 Bainbridge		–		7	–	0	–	0
Bunker Hill NAS		–		6	–	0	–	0
Greensboro		–		4	–	0	–	0
Memphis NATTC		–		2	–	0	–	0
No. 2 Iowa Pre-Flight		–		9	–	1	–	0
No. 10 March Field		–		9	–	1	–	0
No. 8 Del Monte Pre-Flight		–		7	–	1	–	0
Randolph Field		–		9	–	1	–	1
Georgia Pre-Flight		–		5	–	1	–	0
No. 6 Great Lakes Navy		–		10	–	2	–	0
Lubbock AAF		–		5	–	1	–	0
Ottumwa NAS		–		5	–	1	–	0
Camp Davis		–		8	–	2	–	0
Sampson NTS		–		7	–	2	–	0
San Diego NTS		–		7	–	2	–	0
Keesler Field		–		3	–	1	–	0
Wright Field		–		1	–	0	–	1
Camp Lejeune		–		6	–	2	–	1
Fort Riley		–		6	–	2	–	1
Kearns Field		–		5	–	2	–	0
Fort Knox		–		4	–	2	–	0
Cherry Point Marines		–		4	–	2	–	1
Alameda Coast Guard		–		4	–	2	–	1
Fort Douglas		–		4	–	2	–	1
300th Infantry		–		5	–	3	–	0
176th Infantry		–		4	–	3	–	0
Blackland AAF		–		4	–	3	–	0
Fort Sheridan		–		4	–	3	–	0
Fort Warren		–		4	–	3	–	0
Norman NAS		–		4	–	3	–	0
Charleston Coast Guard		–		5	–	4	–	0
Salt Lake AAB		–		4	–	3	–	2
124th Infantry		–		2	–	2	–	0
Camp Kilmer		–		2	–	2	–	0
Camp Lee		–		5	–	5	–	0
Logan Navy		–		2	–	2	–	0
Spokane Air Service		–		2	–	2	–	0
Camp Edwards		–		4	–	5	–	0
Curtis Bay Coast Guard		–		4	–	5	–	0
Saint Mary's Pre-Flight		–		3	–	4	–	1
Jacksonville NATTC		–		3	–	4	–	0
Richmond AAB		–		4	–	6	–	1
Atlantic City NAS		–		2	–	3	–	0
North Carolina Pre-Flight		–		2	–	4	–	1
Patterson Field		–		2	–	4	–	1
Bowman Field		–		2	–	4	–	0
Kirtland Field		–		1	–	2	–	0
Lakehurst NAS		–		2	–	4	–	0
Camp Grant		–		2	–	6	–	2
Lowry Field		–		1	–	3	–	0
Fort Monroe		–		3	–	7	–	0
Daniel Field		–		2	–	7	–	0
Camp Gordon		–		1	–	4	–	0
South Plains AAF		–		1	–	4	–	0
Greenville AAB		–		1	–	5	–	0
Ward Island Marines		–		1	–	5	–	0
Bryan AAF		–		1	–	6	–	0
Pocatello AAB		–		0	–	3	–	0
Norfolk Fleet Marines		–		0	–	9	–	0
Rankings from AP Poll

The 1943 Alameda Coast Guard Sea Lions football team was an American football team that represented the United States Coast Guard's Alameda Coast Guard station during the 1943 college football season. The team compiled a 4–2–1 record. Lieutenant Joe Verducci was the coach, and George Arabian was the assistant coach. The team's two losses were against teams that ended the season ranked in the top 20 in the final AP Poll: Del Monte Pre-Flight (No. 8) and Amos Alonzo Stagg's Pacific Tigers (No. 19).

Two Alameda players were named by the Pacific coast sports editors to the 1943 Service All-Coast football team. Quentin Greenough received first-team honors, and Gonzalo Morales received second-team honors.

In the final Litkenhous Ratings, Alameda Coast Guard ranked 55th among the nation's college and service teams with a rating of 81.8.

== Schedule ==
Date	Opponent	Site	Result	Attendance	Source
September 18	Pacific (CA)	Kezar Stadium; San Francisco, CA	L 7–14	10,000	
September 26	Del Monte Pre-Flight	Kezar Stadium; San Francisco, CA	L 7–34	8,500–10,000	
October 10	vs. San Francisco	Kezar Stadium; San Francisco, CA	W 26–0	3,000	
October 17	vs. Saint Mary's	Kezar Stadium; San Francisco, CA	W 21–7	15,000	
October 23	Pleasanton Naval Replacement Center	Kezar Stadium; San Francisco, CA	W 46–6	3,500	
October 31	Nevada		Cancelled		
November 7	vs. Saint Mary's Pre-Flight	Kezar Stadium; San Francisco, CA	T 13–13	20,000	
November 20	at California	Memorial Stadium; Berkeley, CA	W 7–0	8,000	

== Roster ==
The roster included:

- Dante Benedetti - guard
- Quentin Greenough - center, formerly of Oregon State
- Dale Halbert - halfback
- Colin Hill, formerly of San Jose State
- John Johnson - line
- Albert King - tackle, formerly of Loyola
- Rudy Matulka - guard
- Charles McDowell - end
- Bill McPartland - tackle, formerly of St. Mary's
- Donald Menicucci - halfback
- Gonzalo Morales - halfback, formerly of St. Mary's
- Billy Russo - fullback, formerly of San Francisco University
- Fred Shew - formerly of San Francisco University
- Howard Taft - end
- John Wilborn - halfback
- Charles Wilson - back
