= 1943 Norman Naval Air Station Zoomers football team =

American college football season

1943 Norman Naval Air Station Zoomers football
- Conference: Independent
- Record: 4–3
- Head coach: John Gregg (1st season)
- Home stadium: Hardie Field

1943 military service football records
	Conf.			Overall
Team	W	L	T	W		L		T
No. 17 Bainbridge		–		7	–	0	–	0
Bunker Hill NAS		–		6	–	0	–	0
Greensboro		–		4	–	0	–	0
Memphis NATTC		–		2	–	0	–	0
No. 2 Iowa Pre-Flight		–		9	–	1	–	0
No. 10 March Field		–		9	–	1	–	0
No. 8 Del Monte Pre-Flight		–		7	–	1	–	0
Randolph Field		–		9	–	1	–	1
Georgia Pre-Flight		–		5	–	1	–	0
No. 6 Great Lakes Navy		–		10	–	2	–	0
Lubbock AAF		–		5	–	1	–	0
Ottumwa NAS		–		5	–	1	–	0
Camp Davis		–		8	–	2	–	0
Sampson NTS		–		7	–	2	–	0
San Diego NTS		–		7	–	2	–	0
Keesler Field		–		3	–	1	–	0
Wright Field		–		1	–	0	–	1
Camp Lejeune		–		6	–	2	–	1
Fort Riley		–		6	–	2	–	1
Kearns Field		–		5	–	2	–	0
Fort Knox		–		4	–	2	–	0
Cherry Point Marines		–		4	–	2	–	1
Alameda Coast Guard		–		4	–	2	–	1
Fort Douglas		–		4	–	2	–	1
300th Infantry		–		5	–	3	–	0
176th Infantry		–		4	–	3	–	0
Blackland AAF		–		4	–	3	–	0
Fort Sheridan		–		4	–	3	–	0
Fort Warren		–		4	–	3	–	0
Norman NAS		–		4	–	3	–	0
Charleston Coast Guard		–		5	–	4	–	0
Salt Lake AAB		–		4	–	3	–	2
124th Infantry		–		2	–	2	–	0
Camp Kilmer		–		2	–	2	–	0
Camp Lee		–		5	–	5	–	0
Logan Navy		–		2	–	2	–	0
Spokane Air Service		–		2	–	2	–	0
Camp Edwards		–		4	–	5	–	0
Curtis Bay Coast Guard		–		4	–	5	–	0
Saint Mary's Pre-Flight		–		3	–	4	–	1
Jacksonville NATTC		–		3	–	4	–	0
Richmond AAB		–		4	–	6	–	1
Atlantic City NAS		–		2	–	3	–	0
North Carolina Pre-Flight		–		2	–	4	–	1
Patterson Field		–		2	–	4	–	1
Bowman Field		–		2	–	4	–	0
Kirtland Field		–		1	–	2	–	0
Lakehurst NAS		–		2	–	4	–	0
Camp Grant		–		2	–	6	–	2
Lowry Field		–		1	–	3	–	0
Fort Monroe		–		3	–	7	–	0
Daniel Field		–		2	–	7	–	0
Camp Gordon		–		1	–	4	–	0
South Plains AAF		–		1	–	4	–	0
Greenville AAB		–		1	–	5	–	0
Ward Island Marines		–		1	–	5	–	0
Bryan AAF		–		1	–	6	–	0
Pocatello AAB		–		0	–	3	–	0
Norfolk Fleet Marines		–		0	–	9	–	0
Rankings from AP Poll

The 1943 Norman Naval Air Station Zoomers football team represented the United States Navy's Norman Naval Air Station (Norman NAS), located in Norman, Oklahoma, during the 1943 college football season. Led by head coach John Gregg, the Zoomers compiled a record of 4–3. Louis F. Zarza was an assistant coach for the team.

In the final Litkenhous Ratings, Norman NAS ranked 85th among the nation's college and service teams with a rating of 70.4.

== Schedule ==
Date	Time	Opponent	Site	Result	Attendance	Source
September 25	2:30 p.m.	at Oklahoma	Memorial Stadium; Norman, OK	L 6–22	10,000	
September 29	8:15 p.m.	49th Army General Hospital	Hardie Field; Norman, OK	W 40–0		
October 9		at Fort Riley	Fort Riley, KS	L 0–39	1,500	
October 16		at Oklahoma A&M	Lewis Field; Stillwater, OK	W 20–0		
October 23		Oklahoma JV		W 19–0		
October 30	8:15 p.m.	at Lubbock AAF	Tech Field; Lubbock, TX	L 0–13		
November 7	2:30 p.m.	at Will Rogers Field	Taft Stadium; Oklahoma City, OK	W 33–6	200	
All times are in Central time
