= 1943 South Carolina Gamecocks football team =

American college football season

1943 South Carolina Gamecocks football
- Conference: Southern Conference
- Record: 5–2 (2–1 SoCon)
- Head coach: James Moran Sr. (1st season)
- Captains: Bill McMillan; Neil Allen
- Home stadium: Carolina Municipal Stadium

1943 Southern Conference football standings
	Conf.					Overall
Team	W		L		T	W		L		T
No. 7 Duke $	4	–	0	–	0	8	–	1	–	0
Maryland	2	–	0	–	0	4	–	5	–	0
South Carolina	2	–	1	–	0	5	–	2	–	0
Wake Forest	3	–	2	–	0	4	–	5	–	0
North Carolina	2	–	2	–	0	6	–	3	–	0
Richmond	1	–	1	–	0	6	–	1	–	0
Clemson	2	–	3	–	0	2	–	6	–	0
VMI	2	–	3	–	0	2	–	6	–	0
NC State	1	–	4	–	0	3	–	6	–	0
Davidson	0	–	3	–	0	0	–	5	–	0
$ – Conference champion; Rankings from AP Poll

The 1943 South Carolina Gamecocks football team represented the University of South Carolina as a member of the Southern Conference (SoCon) in the 1943 college football season. Led by James Moran Sr. in his first and only season as head coach, the Gamecocks compiled an overall record of 5–2 with a mark of 2–1 in conference play, placing third in the SoCon. With the onset of World War II, former coach Rex Enright resigned to accept a Navy position.

In the final Litkenhous Ratings, South Carolina ranked 66th among the nation's college and service teams with a rating of 75.9.

== Schedule ==
Date	Time	Opponent	Site	Result	Attendance	Source
September 25		Newberry*	Carolina Stadium; Columbia, SC	W 19–7	5,000	
October 2	3:30 p.m.	176th Infantry*	Carolina Stadium; Columbia, SC	L 7–13	5,000	
October 9		Presbyterian*	Carolina Stadium; Columbia, SC	W 20–7	7,000	
October 21		Clemson	Carolina Stadium; Columbia, SC (rivalry)	W 33–6	18,000	
October 29	2:30 p.m.	vs. Charleston Coast Guard	County Fairgrounds; Orangeburg, SC	W 20–0	5,000	
November 6		North Carolina	Carolina Stadium; Columbia, SC (rivalry)	L 6–21	8,000	
November 25		vs. Wake Forest	American Legion Memorial Stadium; Charlotte, NC	W 13–2	7,000	
*Non-conference game; All times are in Eastern time
