= 1943 Wake Forest Demon Deacons football team =

American college football season

1943 Wake Forest Demon Deacons football
- Conference: Southern Conference
- Record: 4–5 (3–2 SoCon)
- Head coach: Peahead Walker (7th season)
- Captains: Elmer Barbour; Russell Perry
- Home stadium: Groves Stadium

1943 Southern Conference football standings
	Conf.					Overall
Team	W		L		T	W		L		T
No. 7 Duke $	4	–	0	–	0	8	–	1	–	0
Maryland	2	–	0	–	0	4	–	5	–	0
South Carolina	2	–	1	–	0	5	–	2	–	0
Wake Forest	3	–	2	–	0	4	–	5	–	0
North Carolina	2	–	2	–	0	6	–	3	–	0
Richmond	1	–	1	–	0	6	–	1	–	0
Clemson	2	–	3	–	0	2	–	6	–	0
VMI	2	–	3	–	0	2	–	6	–	0
NC State	1	–	4	–	0	3	–	6	–	0
Davidson	0	–	3	–	0	0	–	5	–	0
$ – Conference champion; Rankings from AP Poll

The 1943 Wake Forest Demon Deacons football team was an American football team that represented Wake Forest University during the 1943 college football season. In its seventh season under head coach Peahead Walker, the team compiled a 4–5 record and finished in fourth place in the Southern Conference.

In the final Litkenhous Ratings, Wake Forest ranked 80th among the nation's college and service teams with a rating of 73.4.

== Schedule ==
Date	Time	Opponent	Site	Result	Attendance	Source
September 25	3:30 p.m.	at Camp Davis*	Camp Davis, NC	L 20–24	20,000	
October 2		at Maryland	Byrd Stadium; College Park, MD	L 7–13	1,000	
October 8		at Georgia*	Sanford Stadium; Athens, GA	L 0–7	7,500	
October 16		at NC State	Riddick Stadium; Raleigh, NC (rivalry)	W 54–6	9,000	
October 23		vs. VMI	Municipal Stadium; Lynchburg, VA	W 21–0	3,000	
October 30		at Clemson	Memorial Stadium; Clemson, SC	W 41–12	5,500	
November 6		North Carolina Pre-Flight*	Groves Stadium; Wake Forest, NC	W 20–12	5,000	
November 13		at Greensboro AAB*	World War Memorial Stadium; Greensboro, NC	L 0–14	10,000	
November 25		vs. South Carolina	American Legion Memorial Stadium; Charlotte, NC	L 2–13	7,000	
*Non-conference game; All times are in Eastern time
