= 1943 Georgia Pre-Flight Skycrackers football team =

American college football season

1943 Georgia Pre-Flight Skycrackers football
- Conference: Independent
- Record: 5–1
- Head coach: Rex Enright (1st season)
- Home stadium: Sanford Stadium

1943 military service football records
	Conf.			Overall
Team	W	L	T	W		L		T
No. 17 Bainbridge		–		7	–	0	–	0
Bunker Hill NAS		–		6	–	0	–	0
Greensboro		–		4	–	0	–	0
Memphis NATTC		–		2	–	0	–	0
No. 2 Iowa Pre-Flight		–		9	–	1	–	0
No. 10 March Field		–		9	–	1	–	0
No. 8 Del Monte Pre-Flight		–		7	–	1	–	0
Randolph Field		–		9	–	1	–	1
Georgia Pre-Flight		–		5	–	1	–	0
No. 6 Great Lakes Navy		–		10	–	2	–	0
Lubbock AAF		–		5	–	1	–	0
Ottumwa NAS		–		5	–	1	–	0
Camp Davis		–		8	–	2	–	0
Sampson NTS		–		7	–	2	–	0
San Diego NTS		–		7	–	2	–	0
Keesler Field		–		3	–	1	–	0
Wright Field		–		1	–	0	–	1
Camp Lejeune		–		6	–	2	–	1
Fort Riley		–		6	–	2	–	1
Kearns Field		–		5	–	2	–	0
Fort Knox		–		4	–	2	–	0
Cherry Point Marines		–		4	–	2	–	1
Alameda Coast Guard		–		4	–	2	–	1
Fort Douglas		–		4	–	2	–	1
300th Infantry		–		5	–	3	–	0
176th Infantry		–		4	–	3	–	0
Blackland AAF		–		4	–	3	–	0
Fort Sheridan		–		4	–	3	–	0
Fort Warren		–		4	–	3	–	0
Norman NAS		–		4	–	3	–	0
Charleston Coast Guard		–		5	–	4	–	0
Salt Lake AAB		–		4	–	3	–	2
124th Infantry		–		2	–	2	–	0
Camp Kilmer		–		2	–	2	–	0
Camp Lee		–		5	–	5	–	0
Logan Navy		–		2	–	2	–	0
Spokane Air Service		–		2	–	2	–	0
Camp Edwards		–		4	–	5	–	0
Curtis Bay Coast Guard		–		4	–	5	–	0
Saint Mary's Pre-Flight		–		3	–	4	–	1
Jacksonville NATTC		–		3	–	4	–	0
Richmond AAB		–		4	–	6	–	1
Atlantic City NAS		–		2	–	3	–	0
North Carolina Pre-Flight		–		2	–	4	–	1
Patterson Field		–		2	–	4	–	1
Bowman Field		–		2	–	4	–	0
Kirtland Field		–		1	–	2	–	0
Lakehurst NAS		–		2	–	4	–	0
Camp Grant		–		2	–	6	–	2
Lowry Field		–		1	–	3	–	0
Fort Monroe		–		3	–	7	–	0
Daniel Field		–		2	–	7	–	0
Camp Gordon		–		1	–	4	–	0
South Plains AAF		–		1	–	4	–	0
Greenville AAB		–		1	–	5	–	0
Ward Island Marines		–		1	–	5	–	0
Bryan AAF		–		1	–	6	–	0
Pocatello AAB		–		0	–	3	–	0
Norfolk Fleet Marines		–		0	–	9	–	0
Rankings from AP Poll

The 1943 Georgia Pre-Flight Skycrackers football team represented the United States Navy pre-flight aviation training school at the University of Georgia during the 1943 college football season. The team compiled a 7–1–1 record and outscored opponents by a total of 183 to 105.

In July 1943, Lieutenant Rex Enright was assigned as the team's head coach. His assistant coaches included Andy Pilney, Bud Kerr, and George T. Barclay.

Players included Pat Harder (Wisconsin), Steve Filipowicz (Fordham), Fuller Brooks, Warren Tiller, Carl Nolte, Zealand Thigpen, Tom Averitt, Wally Moesmer, Jim Randall, Carl Dreisbach, H. C. Byars, Jim Shepard, and Oscar Hoequist. Harder was named as a second-team player on the 1943 All-Service football team.

In the final Litkenhous Ratings, Georgia Pre-Flight ranked 40th among the nation's college and service teams with a rating of 85.7.

== Schedule ==
Date	Opponent	Site	Result	Attendance	Source
October 2	Daniel Field	Sanford Stadium; Athens, GA	W 19–13	5,000	
October 9	at Georgia Tech	Grant Field; Atlanta, GA	L 7–35	12,000	
October 17	Newberry	Sanford Stadium; Athens, GA	W 53–0	10,000	
October 23	at North Carolina Pre-Flight	Kenan Memorial Stadium; Chapel Hill, NC	W 20–7	5,000	
October 30	at Tulane	Tulane Stadium; New Orleans, LA	W 14–13	18,000	
November 13	vs. Clemson	Sirrine Stadium; Greenville, SC	W 32–6	4,500	
