= 1943 176th Infantry Spirits football team =

American college football season

1943 176th Infantry Spirits football
- Conference: Independent
- Record: 4–3
- Head coach: Lee D. "Bud" Pollack (1st season)
- Home stadium: Doughboy Stadium

1943 military service football records
	Conf.			Overall
Team	W	L	T	W		L		T
No. 17 Bainbridge		–		7	–	0	–	0
Bunker Hill NAS		–		6	–	0	–	0
Greensboro		–		4	–	0	–	0
Memphis NATTC		–		2	–	0	–	0
No. 2 Iowa Pre-Flight		–		9	–	1	–	0
No. 10 March Field		–		9	–	1	–	0
No. 8 Del Monte Pre-Flight		–		7	–	1	–	0
Randolph Field		–		9	–	1	–	1
Georgia Pre-Flight		–		5	–	1	–	0
No. 6 Great Lakes Navy		–		10	–	2	–	0
Lubbock AAF		–		5	–	1	–	0
Ottumwa NAS		–		5	–	1	–	0
Camp Davis		–		8	–	2	–	0
Sampson NTS		–		7	–	2	–	0
San Diego NTS		–		7	–	2	–	0
Keesler Field		–		3	–	1	–	0
Wright Field		–		1	–	0	–	1
Camp Lejeune		–		6	–	2	–	1
Fort Riley		–		6	–	2	–	1
Kearns Field		–		5	–	2	–	0
Fort Knox		–		4	–	2	–	0
Cherry Point Marines		–		4	–	2	–	1
Alameda Coast Guard		–		4	–	2	–	1
Fort Douglas		–		4	–	2	–	1
300th Infantry		–		5	–	3	–	0
176th Infantry		–		4	–	3	–	0
Blackland AAF		–		4	–	3	–	0
Fort Sheridan		–		4	–	3	–	0
Fort Warren		–		4	–	3	–	0
Norman NAS		–		4	–	3	–	0
Charleston Coast Guard		–		5	–	4	–	0
Salt Lake AAB		–		4	–	3	–	2
124th Infantry		–		2	–	2	–	0
Camp Kilmer		–		2	–	2	–	0
Camp Lee		–		5	–	5	–	0
Logan Navy		–		2	–	2	–	0
Spokane Air Service		–		2	–	2	–	0
Camp Edwards		–		4	–	5	–	0
Curtis Bay Coast Guard		–		4	–	5	–	0
Saint Mary's Pre-Flight		–		3	–	4	–	1
Jacksonville NATTC		–		3	–	4	–	0
Richmond AAB		–		4	–	6	–	1
Atlantic City NAS		–		2	–	3	–	0
North Carolina Pre-Flight		–		2	–	4	–	1
Patterson Field		–		2	–	4	–	1
Bowman Field		–		2	–	4	–	0
Kirtland Field		–		1	–	2	–	0
Lakehurst NAS		–		2	–	4	–	0
Camp Grant		–		2	–	6	–	2
Lowry Field		–		1	–	3	–	0
Fort Monroe		–		3	–	7	–	0
Daniel Field		–		2	–	7	–	0
Camp Gordon		–		1	–	4	–	0
South Plains AAF		–		1	–	4	–	0
Greenville AAB		–		1	–	5	–	0
Ward Island Marines		–		1	–	5	–	0
Bryan AAF		–		1	–	6	–	0
Pocatello AAB		–		0	–	3	–	0
Norfolk Fleet Marines		–		0	–	9	–	0
Rankings from AP Poll

The 1943 176th Infantry Spirits football team represented the United States Army's 176th Infantry Regiment at Fort Benning, located near Columbus, Georgia, during the 1943 college football season. Led by head coach Lee D. "Bud" Pollack, the Spirits compiled a record of 4–3. The team's roster included Andy Dudish, George Poschner, Cullen Rogers, and Bob Waterfield.

In the final Litkenhous Ratings, the 176th Infantry ranked 14th among the nation's college and service teams with a rating of 103.6.

== Schedule ==
Date	Time	Opponent	Site	Result	Attendance	Source
October 2	3:30 p.m.	at South Carolina	Carolina Stadium; Columbia, SC	W 13–7	5,000	
October 10		vs. 124th Infantry	Doughboy Stadium; Fort Benning, GA	L 12–13	17,000	
October 15	9:00 p.m.	at Southwestern Louisiana	McNaspy Stadium; Lafayette, LA	L 7–20		
October 24		vs. 300th Infantry	Doughboy Stadium; Fort Benning, GA	W 14–0	20,000	
November 6		at Daniel Field	Augusta, GA	W 48–7		
November 14	2:00 p.m.	vs. 300th Infantry	Doughboy Stadium; Fort Benning, GA	W 27–20	20,000	
November 26	8:15 p.m.	at Miami (FL)	Burdine Stadium; Miami, FL	L 7–21	11,164	
All times are in Eastern time
