= 1943 Richmond Spiders football team =

American college football season

1943 Richmond Spiders football
- Conference: Southern Conference
- Record: 6–1 (1–1 SoCon)
- Head coach: Malcolm Pitt (1st season)
- Captain: Game captains
- Home stadium: City Stadium

1943 Southern Conference football standings
	Conf.					Overall
Team	W		L		T	W		L		T
No. 7 Duke $	4	–	0	–	0	8	–	1	–	0
Maryland	2	–	0	–	0	4	–	5	–	0
South Carolina	2	–	1	–	0	5	–	2	–	0
Wake Forest	3	–	2	–	0	4	–	5	–	0
North Carolina	2	–	2	–	0	6	–	3	–	0
Richmond	1	–	1	–	0	6	–	1	–	0
Clemson	2	–	3	–	0	2	–	6	–	0
VMI	2	–	3	–	0	2	–	6	–	0
NC State	1	–	4	–	0	3	–	6	–	0
Davidson	0	–	3	–	0	0	–	5	–	0
$ – Conference champion; Rankings from AP Poll

The 1943 Richmond Spiders football team was an American football team that represented the University of Richmond as a member of the Southern Conference (SoCon) during the 1943 college football season. In their first season under head coach Malcolm Pitt, Richmond compiled a 6–1 record, with a mark of 1–1 in conference play, finishing in sixth place in the SoCon.

In the final Litkenhous Ratings, Richmond ranked 77th among the nation's college and service teams with a rating of 74.4.

== Schedule ==
Date	Time	Opponent	Site	Result	Attendance	Source
September 18	8:15 p.m.	Richmond AAB*	City Stadium; Richmond, VA	W 45–0	6,000	
September 25		at Duke	Duke Stadium; Durham, NC	L 0–61	7,415	
October 2	8:15 p.m.	Curtis Bay Coast Guard*	City Stadium; Richmond, VA	W 13–3		
October 9		at Virginia*	Scott Stadium; Charlottesville, VA	W 16–7	4,500	
October 16		VMI	City Stadium; Richmond, VA (rivalry)	W 27–0	4,000	
November 13		Norfolk Fleet Marines*	City Stadium; Richmond, VA	W 74–7		
November 25	2:30 p.m.	Charleston Coast Guard*	City Stadium; Richmond, VA	W 20–6	2,500–2,600	
*Non-conference game
