= 1943 Curtis Bay Coast Guard Cutters football team =

American college football season

1943 Curtis Bay Coast Guard Cutters football
- Conference: Independent
- Record: 4–5
- Head coach: Marvin Dillner & Andy Jakomas (1st season)

1943 military service football records
	Conf.			Overall
Team	W	L	T	W		L		T
No. 17 Bainbridge		–		7	–	0	–	0
Bunker Hill NAS		–		6	–	0	–	0
Greensboro		–		4	–	0	–	0
Memphis NATTC		–		2	–	0	–	0
No. 2 Iowa Pre-Flight		–		9	–	1	–	0
No. 10 March Field		–		9	–	1	–	0
No. 8 Del Monte Pre-Flight		–		7	–	1	–	0
Randolph Field		–		9	–	1	–	1
Georgia Pre-Flight		–		5	–	1	–	0
No. 6 Great Lakes Navy		–		10	–	2	–	0
Lubbock AAF		–		5	–	1	–	0
Ottumwa NAS		–		5	–	1	–	0
Camp Davis		–		8	–	2	–	0
Sampson NTS		–		7	–	2	–	0
San Diego NTS		–		7	–	2	–	0
Keesler Field		–		3	–	1	–	0
Wright Field		–		1	–	0	–	1
Camp Lejeune		–		6	–	2	–	1
Fort Riley		–		6	–	2	–	1
Kearns Field		–		5	–	2	–	0
Fort Knox		–		4	–	2	–	0
Cherry Point Marines		–		4	–	2	–	1
Alameda Coast Guard		–		4	–	2	–	1
Fort Douglas		–		4	–	2	–	1
300th Infantry		–		5	–	3	–	0
176th Infantry		–		4	–	3	–	0
Blackland AAF		–		4	–	3	–	0
Fort Sheridan		–		4	–	3	–	0
Fort Warren		–		4	–	3	–	0
Norman NAS		–		4	–	3	–	0
Charleston Coast Guard		–		5	–	4	–	0
Salt Lake AAB		–		4	–	3	–	2
124th Infantry		–		2	–	2	–	0
Camp Kilmer		–		2	–	2	–	0
Camp Lee		–		5	–	5	–	0
Logan Navy		–		2	–	2	–	0
Spokane Air Service		–		2	–	2	–	0
Camp Edwards		–		4	–	5	–	0
Curtis Bay Coast Guard		–		4	–	5	–	0
Saint Mary's Pre-Flight		–		3	–	4	–	1
Jacksonville NATTC		–		3	–	4	–	0
Richmond AAB		–		4	–	6	–	1
Atlantic City NAS		–		2	–	3	–	0
North Carolina Pre-Flight		–		2	–	4	–	1
Patterson Field		–		2	–	4	–	1
Bowman Field		–		2	–	4	–	0
Kirtland Field		–		1	–	2	–	0
Lakehurst NAS		–		2	–	4	–	0
Camp Grant		–		2	–	6	–	2
Lowry Field		–		1	–	3	–	0
Fort Monroe		–		3	–	7	–	0
Daniel Field		–		2	–	7	–	0
Camp Gordon		–		1	–	4	–	0
South Plains AAF		–		1	–	4	–	0
Greenville AAB		–		1	–	5	–	0
Ward Island Marines		–		1	–	5	–	0
Bryan AAF		–		1	–	6	–	0
Pocatello AAB		–		0	–	3	–	0
Norfolk Fleet Marines		–		0	–	9	–	0
Rankings from AP Poll

The 1943 Curtis Bay Coast Guard Cutters football team represented the United States Coast Guard Yard, located near Baltimore, during the 1943 college football season. Led by coaches Marvin Dillner and Andy Jakomas, the Cutters compiled a record of 4–5.

In the final Litkenhous Ratings, Curtis Bay Coast Guard Cutters ranked 150th among the nation's college and service teams with a rating of 53.0.

== Schedule ==
Date	Time	Opponent	Site	Result	Attendance	Source
September 18		Franklin & Marshall	Baltimore, MD	L 10–12 (scrimmage)		
September 25	2:30 p.m.	at Maryland	Byrd Stadium; College Park, MD	W 13–7	2,000	
October 2	8:15 p.m.	at Richmond	City Stadium; Richmond, VA	L 3–13		
October 8		at Navy JV	Annapolis, MD	L 7–22		
October 16	2:30 p.m.	at Bainbridge	Bainbridge, MD	L 7–26		
October 23		at Fort Monroe	Fort Monroe, VA	W 13–6		
October 30		Camp Lee	Curtis Bay Yard gridiron; Anne Arundel County, MD	W 7–6		
November 6		at Bainbridge	Bainbridge, MD	L 0–54		
November 14	2:00 p.m.	at Camp Lee	Camp Lee, VA	L 0–33		
November 21		at York Vikings	West York High School field; York, PA	W 20–0		
All times are in Eastern time
