= 1943 Norfolk Fleet Marines football team =

American college football season

1943 Norfolk Fleet Marines football
- Conference: Independent
- Record: 0–9
- Home stadium: Forman Field

1943 military service football records
	Conf.			Overall
Team	W	L	T	W		L		T
No. 17 Bainbridge		–		7	–	0	–	0
Bunker Hill NAS		–		6	–	0	–	0
Greensboro		–		4	–	0	–	0
Memphis NATTC		–		2	–	0	–	0
No. 2 Iowa Pre-Flight		–		9	–	1	–	0
No. 10 March Field		–		9	–	1	–	0
No. 8 Del Monte Pre-Flight		–		7	–	1	–	0
Randolph Field		–		9	–	1	–	1
Georgia Pre-Flight		–		5	–	1	–	0
No. 6 Great Lakes Navy		–		10	–	2	–	0
Lubbock AAF		–		5	–	1	–	0
Ottumwa NAS		–		5	–	1	–	0
Camp Davis		–		8	–	2	–	0
Sampson NTS		–		7	–	2	–	0
San Diego NTS		–		7	–	2	–	0
Keesler Field		–		3	–	1	–	0
Wright Field		–		1	–	0	–	1
Camp Lejeune		–		6	–	2	–	1
Fort Riley		–		6	–	2	–	1
Kearns Field		–		5	–	2	–	0
Fort Knox		–		4	–	2	–	0
Cherry Point Marines		–		4	–	2	–	1
Alameda Coast Guard		–		4	–	2	–	1
Fort Douglas		–		4	–	2	–	1
300th Infantry		–		5	–	3	–	0
176th Infantry		–		4	–	3	–	0
Blackland AAF		–		4	–	3	–	0
Fort Sheridan		–		4	–	3	–	0
Fort Warren		–		4	–	3	–	0
Norman NAS		–		4	–	3	–	0
Charleston Coast Guard		–		5	–	4	–	0
Salt Lake AAB		–		4	–	3	–	2
124th Infantry		–		2	–	2	–	0
Camp Kilmer		–		2	–	2	–	0
Camp Lee		–		5	–	5	–	0
Logan Navy		–		2	–	2	–	0
Spokane Air Service		–		2	–	2	–	0
Camp Edwards		–		4	–	5	–	0
Curtis Bay Coast Guard		–		4	–	5	–	0
Saint Mary's Pre-Flight		–		3	–	4	–	1
Jacksonville NATTC		–		3	–	4	–	0
Richmond AAB		–		4	–	6	–	1
Atlantic City NAS		–		2	–	3	–	0
North Carolina Pre-Flight		–		2	–	4	–	1
Patterson Field		–		2	–	4	–	1
Bowman Field		–		2	–	4	–	0
Kirtland Field		–		1	–	2	–	0
Lakehurst NAS		–		2	–	4	–	0
Camp Grant		–		2	–	6	–	2
Lowry Field		–		1	–	3	–	0
Fort Monroe		–		3	–	7	–	0
Daniel Field		–		2	–	7	–	0
Camp Gordon		–		1	–	4	–	0
South Plains AAF		–		1	–	4	–	0
Greenville AAB		–		1	–	5	–	0
Ward Island Marines		–		1	–	5	–	0
Bryan AAF		–		1	–	6	–	0
Pocatello AAB		–		0	–	3	–	0
Norfolk Fleet Marines		–		0	–	9	–	0
Rankings from AP Poll

The 1943 Norfolk Fleet Marines football team represented the Fleet Marine Force of the United States Marine Corps at Norfolk, Virginia, during the 1943 college football season. The Marines compiled a record of 0–9.

In the final Litkenhous Ratings, the Norfolk Fleet Marines ranked 236th among the nation's college and service teams with a rating of 19.7.

== Schedule ==
Date	Time	Opponent	Site	Result	Attendance	Source
September 25		at Fort Monroe	Fort Monroe, VA	L 0–18		
October 1	8:00 p.m.	at Apprentice	Apprentice stadium; Newport News, VA	L 6–25		
October 10	2:00 p.m.	Camp Lee	Forman Field; Norfolk, VA	L 0–40		
October ?		Richmond AAB		L 0–20		
October 24		Richmond AAB	Forman Field; Norfolk, VA	L 0–40	1,500	
November 6	2:00 p.m.	at Camp Lejeune	New River, NC	L 6–55		
November 13	8:15 p.m.	at Richmond	City Stadium; Richmond, VA	L 7–74		
November 21	2:30 p.m.	Fort Monroe	Forman Field; Norfolk, VA	L 6–44		
November 25	2:30 p.m.	at William & Mary freshmen	Cary Field; Williamsburg, VA	L 0–72	2,500	
All times are in Eastern time
