= 1943 Camp Lee Travellers football team =

American college football season

1943 Camp Lee Travellers football
- Conference: Independent
- Record: 5–5
- Head coach: Mitchell Spivey (1st season)
- Home stadium: Lee Field

1943 military service football records
| | Conf. | | | Overall |
| Team | W | L | T | W | | L | | T |
|---|---|---|---|---|---|---|---|---|
| No. 17 Bainbridge | | – | | 7 | – | 0 | – | 0 |
| Bunker Hill NAS | | – | | 6 | – | 0 | – | 0 |
| Greensboro | | – | | 4 | – | 0 | – | 0 |
| Memphis NATTC | | – | | 2 | – | 0 | – | 0 |
| No. 2 Iowa Pre-Flight | | – | | 9 | – | 1 | – | 0 |
| No. 10 March Field | | – | | 9 | – | 1 | – | 0 |
| No. 8 Del Monte Pre-Flight | | – | | 7 | – | 1 | – | 0 |
| Randolph Field | | – | | 9 | – | 1 | – | 1 |
| Georgia Pre-Flight | | – | | 5 | – | 1 | – | 0 |
| No. 6 Great Lakes Navy | | – | | 10 | – | 2 | – | 0 |
| Lubbock AAF | | – | | 5 | – | 1 | – | 0 |
| Ottumwa NAS | | – | | 5 | – | 1 | – | 0 |
| Camp Davis | | – | | 8 | – | 2 | – | 0 |
| Sampson NTS | | – | | 7 | – | 2 | – | 0 |
| San Diego NTS | | – | | 7 | – | 2 | – | 0 |
| Keesler Field | | – | | 3 | – | 1 | – | 0 |
| Wright Field | | – | | 1 | – | 0 | – | 1 |
| Camp Lejeune | | – | | 6 | – | 2 | – | 1 |
| Fort Riley | | – | | 6 | – | 2 | – | 1 |
| Kearns Field | | – | | 5 | – | 2 | – | 0 |
| Fort Knox | | – | | 4 | – | 2 | – | 0 |
| Cherry Point Marines | | – | | 4 | – | 2 | – | 1 |
| Alameda Coast Guard | | – | | 4 | – | 2 | – | 1 |
| Fort Douglas | | – | | 4 | – | 2 | – | 1 |
| 300th Infantry | | – | | 5 | – | 3 | – | 0 |
| 176th Infantry | | – | | 4 | – | 3 | – | 0 |
| Blackland AAF | | – | | 4 | – | 3 | – | 0 |
| Fort Sheridan | | – | | 4 | – | 3 | – | 0 |
| Fort Warren | | – | | 4 | – | 3 | – | 0 |
| Norman NAS | | – | | 4 | – | 3 | – | 0 |
| Charleston Coast Guard | | – | | 5 | – | 4 | – | 0 |
| Salt Lake AAB | | – | | 4 | – | 3 | – | 2 |
| 124th Infantry | | – | | 2 | – | 2 | – | 0 |
| Camp Kilmer | | – | | 2 | – | 2 | – | 0 |
| Camp Lee | | – | | 5 | – | 5 | – | 0 |
| Logan Navy | | – | | 2 | – | 2 | – | 0 |
| Spokane Air Service | | – | | 2 | – | 2 | – | 0 |
| Camp Edwards | | – | | 4 | – | 5 | – | 0 |
| Curtis Bay Coast Guard | | – | | 4 | – | 5 | – | 0 |
| Saint Mary's Pre-Flight | | – | | 3 | – | 4 | – | 1 |
| Jacksonville NATTC | | – | | 3 | – | 4 | – | 0 |
| Richmond AAB | | – | | 4 | – | 6 | – | 1 |
| Atlantic City NAS | | – | | 2 | – | 3 | – | 0 |
| North Carolina Pre-Flight | | – | | 2 | – | 4 | – | 1 |
| Patterson Field | | – | | 2 | – | 4 | – | 1 |
| Bowman Field | | – | | 2 | – | 4 | – | 0 |
| Kirtland Field | | – | | 1 | – | 2 | – | 0 |
| Lakehurst NAS | | – | | 2 | – | 4 | – | 0 |
| Camp Grant | | – | | 2 | – | 6 | – | 2 |
| Lowry Field | | – | | 1 | – | 3 | – | 0 |
| Fort Monroe | | – | | 3 | – | 7 | – | 0 |
| Daniel Field | | – | | 2 | – | 7 | – | 0 |
| Camp Gordon | | – | | 1 | – | 4 | – | 0 |
| South Plains AAF | | – | | 1 | – | 4 | – | 0 |
| Greenville AAB | | – | | 1 | – | 5 | – | 0 |
| Ward Island Marines | | – | | 1 | – | 5 | – | 0 |
| Bryan AAF | | – | | 1 | – | 6 | – | 0 |
| Pocatello AAB | | – | | 0 | – | 3 | – | 0 |
| Norfolk Fleet Marines | | – | | 0 | – | 9 | – | 0 |
Rankings from AP Poll

The 1943 Camp Lee Travellers football team, also called the "All-Stars", represented the United States Army post at Camp Lee, located in Prince George County, Virginia, during the 1943 college football season. Led by head coach Mitchell Spivey, the Travellers compiled a record of 5–5. Warren Casey was the team's line coach. The team's roster included Mitchell Olenski.

In the final Litkenhous Ratings, Camp Lee ranked 126th among the nation's college and service teams with a rating of 58.8.

== Schedule ==
| Date | Time | Opponent | Site | Result | Attendance | Source |
|---|---|---|---|---|---|---|
| September 12 | | Brooklyn Dodgers | Lee Field; Camp Lee, VA | L 6–28 | 12,000 | |
| September 26 | 2:30 p.m. | New York Giants | Lee Field; Camp Lee, VA | L 0–21 | 12,000 | |
| October 10 | 2:00 p.m. | at Norfolk Fleet Marines | Forman Field; Norfolk, VA | W 40–0 | | |
| October 17 | | at Cherry Point Marines | Cherry Point, NC | W 20–0 | | |
| October 24 | 2:00 p.m. | Bainbridge | Lee Field; Camp Lee, VA | L 0–49 | 12,000 | |
| October 30 | | at Curtis Bay Coast Guard | Curtis Bay Yard gridiron; Anne Arundel County, MD | L 6–7 | | |
| November 7 | | at Richmond AAB | Richmond, VA | L 0–6 | | |
| November 14 | 2:00 p.m. | Curtis Bay Coast Guard | Camp Lee, VA | W 33–0 | | |
| November 28 | 2:00 p.m. | Fort Monroe | Camp Lee, VA | W 6–0 | | |
| December 5 | | Richmond AAB | Lee Field; Camp Lee, VA | W 6–0 | 6,000 | |
All times are in Eastern time
