= 1943 Charleston Coast Guard Sailors football team =

American college football season

1943 Charleston Coast Guard Sailors football
- Conference: Independent
- Record: 5–4
- Head coach: Mark Brashares (1st season)
- Home stadium: Johnson Hagood Stadium

1943 military service football records
	Conf.			Overall
Team	W	L	T	W		L		T
No. 17 Bainbridge		–		7	–	0	–	0
Bunker Hill NAS		–		6	–	0	–	0
Greensboro		–		4	–	0	–	0
Memphis NATTC		–		2	–	0	–	0
No. 2 Iowa Pre-Flight		–		9	–	1	–	0
No. 10 March Field		–		9	–	1	–	0
No. 8 Del Monte Pre-Flight		–		7	–	1	–	0
Randolph Field		–		9	–	1	–	1
Georgia Pre-Flight		–		5	–	1	–	0
No. 6 Great Lakes Navy		–		10	–	2	–	0
Lubbock AAF		–		5	–	1	–	0
Ottumwa NAS		–		5	–	1	–	0
Camp Davis		–		8	–	2	–	0
Sampson NTS		–		7	–	2	–	0
San Diego NTS		–		7	–	2	–	0
Keesler Field		–		3	–	1	–	0
Wright Field		–		1	–	0	–	1
Camp Lejeune		–		6	–	2	–	1
Fort Riley		–		6	–	2	–	1
Kearns Field		–		5	–	2	–	0
Fort Knox		–		4	–	2	–	0
Cherry Point Marines		–		4	–	2	–	1
Alameda Coast Guard		–		4	–	2	–	1
Fort Douglas		–		4	–	2	–	1
300th Infantry		–		5	–	3	–	0
176th Infantry		–		4	–	3	–	0
Blackland AAF		–		4	–	3	–	0
Fort Sheridan		–		4	–	3	–	0
Fort Warren		–		4	–	3	–	0
Norman NAS		–		4	–	3	–	0
Charleston Coast Guard		–		5	–	4	–	0
Salt Lake AAB		–		4	–	3	–	2
124th Infantry		–		2	–	2	–	0
Camp Kilmer		–		2	–	2	–	0
Camp Lee		–		5	–	5	–	0
Logan Navy		–		2	–	2	–	0
Spokane Air Service		–		2	–	2	–	0
Camp Edwards		–		4	–	5	–	0
Curtis Bay Coast Guard		–		4	–	5	–	0
Saint Mary's Pre-Flight		–		3	–	4	–	1
Jacksonville NATTC		–		3	–	4	–	0
Richmond AAB		–		4	–	6	–	1
Atlantic City NAS		–		2	–	3	–	0
North Carolina Pre-Flight		–		2	–	4	–	1
Patterson Field		–		2	–	4	–	1
Bowman Field		–		2	–	4	–	0
Kirtland Field		–		1	–	2	–	0
Lakehurst NAS		–		2	–	4	–	0
Camp Grant		–		2	–	6	–	2
Lowry Field		–		1	–	3	–	0
Fort Monroe		–		3	–	7	–	0
Daniel Field		–		2	–	7	–	0
Camp Gordon		–		1	–	4	–	0
South Plains AAF		–		1	–	4	–	0
Greenville AAB		–		1	–	5	–	0
Ward Island Marines		–		1	–	5	–	0
Bryan AAF		–		1	–	6	–	0
Pocatello AAB		–		0	–	3	–	0
Norfolk Fleet Marines		–		0	–	9	–	0
Rankings from AP Poll

The 1943 Charleston Coast Guard Sailors football team represented the United States Coast Guard in Charleston, South Carolina, during the 1943 college football season. Led by head coach Mark Brashares, the Sailors compiled a record of 5–4.

In the final Litkenhous Ratings, Charleston Coast Guard ranked 106th among the nation's college and service teams with a rating of 64.4.

== Schedule ==
Date	Time	Opponent	Site	Result	Attendance	Source
September 26		Fort Jackson 59th Signal Battalion	Johnson Hagood Stadium; Charleston, SC	W 53–0		
October 3	3:00 p.m.	Camp Davis	Johnson Hagood Stadium; Charleston, SC	L 0–25	7,500	
October 16	3:00 p.m.	at Davidson	American Legion Memorial Stadium; Charlotte, NC	W 36–0	3,000	
October 23	8:15 p.m.	at Miami (FL)	Burdine Stadium; Miami, FL	L 6–13	16,305	
October 29	2:30 p.m.	vs. South Carolina	County Fairgrounds; Orangeburg, SC	L 0–20	5,000	
November 7		Camp Gordon	Charleston, SC	W 25–6	3,500	
November 11		at Newberry	Newberry, SC	W 21–0	2,000	
November 20		10th Armored	Charleston, SC	W 20–7	2,000	
November 25	2:30 p.m.	at Richmond	City Stadium; Richmond, VA	L 6–20	2,500–2,600	
All times are in Eastern time
