= 1943 South Plains Army Air Field Winged Commandoes football team =

American college football season

1943 South Plains Army Air Field Winged Commandoes football
- Conference: Independent
- Record: 1–4
- Head coach: Nathan B. Eubank (2nd season)
- Home stadium: Tech Field

1943 military service football records
	Conf.			Overall
Team	W	L	T	W		L		T
No. 17 Bainbridge		–		7	–	0	–	0
Bunker Hill NAS		–		6	–	0	–	0
Greensboro		–		4	–	0	–	0
Memphis NATTC		–		2	–	0	–	0
No. 2 Iowa Pre-Flight		–		9	–	1	–	0
No. 10 March Field		–		9	–	1	–	0
No. 8 Del Monte Pre-Flight		–		7	–	1	–	0
Randolph Field		–		9	–	1	–	1
Georgia Pre-Flight		–		5	–	1	–	0
No. 6 Great Lakes Navy		–		10	–	2	–	0
Lubbock AAF		–		5	–	1	–	0
Ottumwa NAS		–		5	–	1	–	0
Camp Davis		–		8	–	2	–	0
Sampson NTS		–		7	–	2	–	0
San Diego NTS		–		7	–	2	–	0
Keesler Field		–		3	–	1	–	0
Wright Field		–		1	–	0	–	1
Camp Lejeune		–		6	–	2	–	1
Fort Riley		–		6	–	2	–	1
Kearns Field		–		5	–	2	–	0
Fort Knox		–		4	–	2	–	0
Cherry Point Marines		–		4	–	2	–	1
Alameda Coast Guard		–		4	–	2	–	1
Fort Douglas		–		4	–	2	–	1
300th Infantry		–		5	–	3	–	0
176th Infantry		–		4	–	3	–	0
Blackland AAF		–		4	–	3	–	0
Fort Sheridan		–		4	–	3	–	0
Fort Warren		–		4	–	3	–	0
Norman NAS		–		4	–	3	–	0
Charleston Coast Guard		–		5	–	4	–	0
Salt Lake AAB		–		4	–	3	–	2
124th Infantry		–		2	–	2	–	0
Camp Kilmer		–		2	–	2	–	0
Camp Lee		–		5	–	5	–	0
Logan Navy		–		2	–	2	–	0
Spokane Air Service		–		2	–	2	–	0
Camp Edwards		–		4	–	5	–	0
Curtis Bay Coast Guard		–		4	–	5	–	0
Saint Mary's Pre-Flight		–		3	–	4	–	1
Jacksonville NATTC		–		3	–	4	–	0
Richmond AAB		–		4	–	6	–	1
Atlantic City NAS		–		2	–	3	–	0
North Carolina Pre-Flight		–		2	–	4	–	1
Patterson Field		–		2	–	4	–	1
Bowman Field		–		2	–	4	–	0
Kirtland Field		–		1	–	2	–	0
Lakehurst NAS		–		2	–	4	–	0
Camp Grant		–		2	–	6	–	2
Lowry Field		–		1	–	3	–	0
Fort Monroe		–		3	–	7	–	0
Daniel Field		–		2	–	7	–	0
Camp Gordon		–		1	–	4	–	0
South Plains AAF		–		1	–	4	–	0
Greenville AAB		–		1	–	5	–	0
Ward Island Marines		–		1	–	5	–	0
Bryan AAF		–		1	–	6	–	0
Pocatello AAB		–		0	–	3	–	0
Norfolk Fleet Marines		–		0	–	9	–	0
Rankings from AP Poll

The 1943 South Plains Army Air Field Winged Commandoes football team represented the United States Army Air Forces's South Plains Army Air Field (South Plains AAF or SPAAF), located near Lubbock, Texas, during the 1943 college football season. Led by head coach Nathan B. Eubank, the Winged Commandoes compiled a record of 1–4. Lieutenant Ray Cagny was the team's backfield coach and also played as a halfback.

In the final Litkenhous Ratings, Ottumwa NAS ranked 153rd among the nation's college and service teams with a rating of 53.0.

== Schedule ==
Date	Time	Opponent	Site	Result	Attendance	Source
September 26	3:00 p.m.	Fort Bliss	Tech Field; Lubbock, TX	W 30–0		
October 3	3:00 p.m.	vs. Lubbock AAF	Tech Field; Lubbock, TX	L 12–27		
October 9	8:00 p.m.	No. 11 Southwestern (TX)	Tech Field; Lubbock, TX	L 40–0	4,500	
October 16	8:15 p.m.	at Texas Tech	Tech Field; Lubbock, TX	L 12–14	6,000	
October 30		at Kirtland Field	Albuquerque, NM	L 0–18		
Rankings from AP Poll released prior to the game; All times are in Central time
