= 1943 Blackland Army Air Field Eagles football team =

American college football season

1943 Blackland Army Air Field Eagles football
- Conference: Independent
- Record: 4–3
- Head coach: John Schuehle (1st season)
- Home stadium: Municipal Stadium

1943 military service football records
	Conf.			Overall
Team	W	L	T	W		L		T
No. 17 Bainbridge		–		7	–	0	–	0
Bunker Hill NAS		–		6	–	0	–	0
Greensboro		–		4	–	0	–	0
Memphis NATTC		–		2	–	0	–	0
No. 2 Iowa Pre-Flight		–		9	–	1	–	0
No. 10 March Field		–		9	–	1	–	0
No. 8 Del Monte Pre-Flight		–		7	–	1	–	0
Randolph Field		–		9	–	1	–	1
Georgia Pre-Flight		–		5	–	1	–	0
No. 6 Great Lakes Navy		–		10	–	2	–	0
Lubbock AAF		–		5	–	1	–	0
Ottumwa NAS		–		5	–	1	–	0
Camp Davis		–		8	–	2	–	0
Sampson NTS		–		7	–	2	–	0
San Diego NTS		–		7	–	2	–	0
Keesler Field		–		3	–	1	–	0
Wright Field		–		1	–	0	–	1
Camp Lejeune		–		6	–	2	–	1
Fort Riley		–		6	–	2	–	1
Kearns Field		–		5	–	2	–	0
Fort Knox		–		4	–	2	–	0
Cherry Point Marines		–		4	–	2	–	1
Alameda Coast Guard		–		4	–	2	–	1
Fort Douglas		–		4	–	2	–	1
300th Infantry		–		5	–	3	–	0
176th Infantry		–		4	–	3	–	0
Blackland AAF		–		4	–	3	–	0
Fort Sheridan		–		4	–	3	–	0
Fort Warren		–		4	–	3	–	0
Norman NAS		–		4	–	3	–	0
Charleston Coast Guard		–		5	–	4	–	0
Salt Lake AAB		–		4	–	3	–	2
124th Infantry		–		2	–	2	–	0
Camp Kilmer		–		2	–	2	–	0
Camp Lee		–		5	–	5	–	0
Logan Navy		–		2	–	2	–	0
Spokane Air Service		–		2	–	2	–	0
Camp Edwards		–		4	–	5	–	0
Curtis Bay Coast Guard		–		4	–	5	–	0
Saint Mary's Pre-Flight		–		3	–	4	–	1
Jacksonville NATTC		–		3	–	4	–	0
Richmond AAB		–		4	–	6	–	1
Atlantic City NAS		–		2	–	3	–	0
North Carolina Pre-Flight		–		2	–	4	–	1
Patterson Field		–		2	–	4	–	1
Bowman Field		–		2	–	4	–	0
Kirtland Field		–		1	–	2	–	0
Lakehurst NAS		–		2	–	4	–	0
Camp Grant		–		2	–	6	–	2
Lowry Field		–		1	–	3	–	0
Fort Monroe		–		3	–	7	–	0
Daniel Field		–		2	–	7	–	0
Camp Gordon		–		1	–	4	–	0
South Plains AAF		–		1	–	4	–	0
Greenville AAB		–		1	–	5	–	0
Ward Island Marines		–		1	–	5	–	0
Bryan AAF		–		1	–	6	–	0
Pocatello AAB		–		0	–	3	–	0
Norfolk Fleet Marines		–		0	–	9	–	0
Rankings from AP Poll

The 1943 Blackland Army Air Field Eagles football team represented the United States Army Air Force's Blackland Army Air Field (Blackland AAF or BAAF), located near Waco, Texas, during the 1943 college football season. Led by head coach John Schuehle, the Eagles compiled a record of 4–3. The team's roster included Jack Russell

In the final Litkenhous Ratings, Blackland AAF ranked 132nd among the nation's college and service teams with a rating of 57.1.

== Schedule ==
Date	Time	Opponent	Site	Result	Attendance	Source
September 25	2:30 p.m.	at Texas	War Memorial Stadium; Austin, TX	L 6–65	9,000	
October 3	2:30 p.m.	Bryan AAF	Municipal Stadium; Waco, TX	W 21–12		
October 10		Ward Island Marines	Municipal Stadium; Waco, TX	W 19–6		
October 16		at Bryan AAF	Stephen F. Austin High School field; Bryan, TX	W 13–0		
October 23		Randolph Field	Municipal Stadium; Waco, TX	L 0–7		
October 30	2:30 p.m.	North Texas Aggies	Municipal Stadium; Waco, TX	W 13–7		
November 6		at Randolph Field	Grater Field; Randolph Field, TX	L 6–26		
All times are in Central time
