= 1943 Richmond Army Air Base Thunderbyrds football team =

American college football season

1943 Richmond Army Air Base Thunderbyrds football
- Conference: Independent
- Record: 4–6–1
- Head coach: John C. Anderson (1st season)
- Home stadium: Air Base field

1943 military service football records
	Conf.			Overall
Team	W	L	T	W		L		T
No. 17 Bainbridge		–		7	–	0	–	0
Bunker Hill NAS		–		6	–	0	–	0
Greensboro		–		4	–	0	–	0
Memphis NATTC		–		2	–	0	–	0
No. 2 Iowa Pre-Flight		–		9	–	1	–	0
No. 10 March Field		–		9	–	1	–	0
No. 8 Del Monte Pre-Flight		–		7	–	1	–	0
Randolph Field		–		9	–	1	–	1
Georgia Pre-Flight		–		5	–	1	–	0
No. 6 Great Lakes Navy		–		10	–	2	–	0
Lubbock AAF		–		5	–	1	–	0
Ottumwa NAS		–		5	–	1	–	0
Camp Davis		–		8	–	2	–	0
Sampson NTS		–		7	–	2	–	0
San Diego NTS		–		7	–	2	–	0
Keesler Field		–		3	–	1	–	0
Wright Field		–		1	–	0	–	1
Camp Lejeune		–		6	–	2	–	1
Fort Riley		–		6	–	2	–	1
Kearns Field		–		5	–	2	–	0
Fort Knox		–		4	–	2	–	0
Cherry Point Marines		–		4	–	2	–	1
Alameda Coast Guard		–		4	–	2	–	1
Fort Douglas		–		4	–	2	–	1
300th Infantry		–		5	–	3	–	0
176th Infantry		–		4	–	3	–	0
Blackland AAF		–		4	–	3	–	0
Fort Sheridan		–		4	–	3	–	0
Fort Warren		–		4	–	3	–	0
Norman NAS		–		4	–	3	–	0
Charleston Coast Guard		–		5	–	4	–	0
Salt Lake AAB		–		4	–	3	–	2
124th Infantry		–		2	–	2	–	0
Camp Kilmer		–		2	–	2	–	0
Camp Lee		–		5	–	5	–	0
Logan Navy		–		2	–	2	–	0
Spokane Air Service		–		2	–	2	–	0
Camp Edwards		–		4	–	5	–	0
Curtis Bay Coast Guard		–		4	–	5	–	0
Saint Mary's Pre-Flight		–		3	–	4	–	1
Jacksonville NATTC		–		3	–	4	–	0
Richmond AAB		–		4	–	6	–	1
Atlantic City NAS		–		2	–	3	–	0
North Carolina Pre-Flight		–		2	–	4	–	1
Patterson Field		–		2	–	4	–	1
Bowman Field		–		2	–	4	–	0
Kirtland Field		–		1	–	2	–	0
Lakehurst NAS		–		2	–	4	–	0
Camp Grant		–		2	–	6	–	2
Lowry Field		–		1	–	3	–	0
Fort Monroe		–		3	–	7	–	0
Daniel Field		–		2	–	7	–	0
Camp Gordon		–		1	–	4	–	0
South Plains AAF		–		1	–	4	–	0
Greenville AAB		–		1	–	5	–	0
Ward Island Marines		–		1	–	5	–	0
Bryan AAF		–		1	–	6	–	0
Pocatello AAB		–		0	–	3	–	0
Norfolk Fleet Marines		–		0	–	9	–	0
Rankings from AP Poll

The 1943 Richmond Army Air Base Thunderbyrds football team represented the United States Army Air Forces's Richmond Army Air Base (Richmond AAB or RAAB) near Richmond, Virginia during the 1943 college football season. Led by head coach John C. Anderson, the Thunderbyrds compiled a record of 4–6–1.

In the final Litkenhous Ratings, Richmond AAB ranked 181st among the nation's college and service teams with a rating of 44.1.

== Schedule ==
Date	Time	Opponent	Site	Result	Attendance	Source
September 18	8:15 p.m.	at Richmond	City Stadium; Richmond, VA	L 0–45	6,000	
September 25		at Virginia	Scott Stadium; Charlottesville, VA	T 7–7	3,000	
October 3		Fort Monroe	Richmond, VA	W 6–0		
October 9	2:30 p.m.	at Maryland	Byrd Stadium; College Park, MD	L 6–19	1,500	
October ?		Norfolk Fleet Marines		W 20–0		
October 24		at Norfolk Fleet Marines	Forman Field; Norfolk, VA	W 40–0	1,500	
October 30	2:00 p.m.	at Fort Monroe	Fort Story, VA	L 13–18		
November 7		Camp Lee	Richmond, VA	W 6–0		
November 13	2:30 p.m.	Cherry Point Marines	Air Base field; Richmond, VA	L 0–20		
November 20	3:00 p.m.	William & Mary freshmen	Cary Field; Williamsburg, VA	L 6–14		
December 5		at Camp Lee	Lee Field; Camp Lee, VA	L 0–6	6,000	
All times are in Eastern time
