= 1943 San Diego Naval Training Station Bluejackets football team =

American college football season

1943 San Diego Naval Training Station Bluejackets football
- Conference: Independent
- Record: 7–2
- Head coach: Bo Molenda (1st season)
- Captain: Ed Nelson (right tackle)
- Home stadium: Hull Field

1943 military service football records
	Conf.			Overall
Team	W	L	T	W		L		T
No. 17 Bainbridge		–		7	–	0	–	0
Bunker Hill NAS		–		6	–	0	–	0
Greensboro		–		4	–	0	–	0
Memphis NATTC		–		2	–	0	–	0
No. 2 Iowa Pre-Flight		–		9	–	1	–	0
No. 10 March Field		–		9	–	1	–	0
No. 8 Del Monte Pre-Flight		–		7	–	1	–	0
Randolph Field		–		9	–	1	–	1
Georgia Pre-Flight		–		5	–	1	–	0
No. 6 Great Lakes Navy		–		10	–	2	–	0
Lubbock AAF		–		5	–	1	–	0
Ottumwa NAS		–		5	–	1	–	0
Camp Davis		–		8	–	2	–	0
Sampson NTS		–		7	–	2	–	0
San Diego NTS		–		7	–	2	–	0
Keesler Field		–		3	–	1	–	0
Wright Field		–		1	–	0	–	1
Camp Lejeune		–		6	–	2	–	1
Fort Riley		–		6	–	2	–	1
Kearns Field		–		5	–	2	–	0
Fort Knox		–		4	–	2	–	0
Cherry Point Marines		–		4	–	2	–	1
Alameda Coast Guard		–		4	–	2	–	1
Fort Douglas		–		4	–	2	–	1
300th Infantry		–		5	–	3	–	0
176th Infantry		–		4	–	3	–	0
Blackland AAF		–		4	–	3	–	0
Fort Sheridan		–		4	–	3	–	0
Fort Warren		–		4	–	3	–	0
Norman NAS		–		4	–	3	–	0
Charleston Coast Guard		–		5	–	4	–	0
Salt Lake AAB		–		4	–	3	–	2
124th Infantry		–		2	–	2	–	0
Camp Kilmer		–		2	–	2	–	0
Camp Lee		–		5	–	5	–	0
Logan Navy		–		2	–	2	–	0
Spokane Air Service		–		2	–	2	–	0
Camp Edwards		–		4	–	5	–	0
Curtis Bay Coast Guard		–		4	–	5	–	0
Saint Mary's Pre-Flight		–		3	–	4	–	1
Jacksonville NATTC		–		3	–	4	–	0
Richmond AAB		–		4	–	6	–	1
Atlantic City NAS		–		2	–	3	–	0
North Carolina Pre-Flight		–		2	–	4	–	1
Patterson Field		–		2	–	4	–	1
Bowman Field		–		2	–	4	–	0
Kirtland Field		–		1	–	2	–	0
Lakehurst NAS		–		2	–	4	–	0
Camp Grant		–		2	–	6	–	2
Lowry Field		–		1	–	3	–	0
Fort Monroe		–		3	–	7	–	0
Daniel Field		–		2	–	7	–	0
Camp Gordon		–		1	–	4	–	0
South Plains AAF		–		1	–	4	–	0
Greenville AAB		–		1	–	5	–	0
Ward Island Marines		–		1	–	5	–	0
Bryan AAF		–		1	–	6	–	0
Pocatello AAB		–		0	–	3	–	0
Norfolk Fleet Marines		–		0	–	9	–	0
Rankings from AP Poll

The 1943 San Diego Naval Air Station Bluejackets football team represented San Diego Naval Training Station (San Diego NTS) during the 1943 college football season. The team was coached by Bo Molenda, a former Michigan football player, and played on Hull Field in San Diego. The Bluejackets compiled a 7–2 record, shut our four teams, and outscored their opponents by a total of 255 to 36. They also defeated No. 4 USC in November, which at the time was riding a six-game undefeated, untied, and unscored upon streak.

In the final Litkenhous Ratings, San Diego NTS ranked 53rd among the nation's college and service teams with a rating of 82.5.

== Schedule ==
Date	Opponent	Rank	Site	Result	Attendance	Source
September 25	Redlands		Hull Field; San Diego, CA	W 20–0	5,000	
October 3	Fort Ord		Hull Field; San Diego, CA	W 59–0		
October 9	Camp Pomona		Hull Field; San Diego, CA	W 48–2		
October 16	No. 12 March Field		Hull Field; San Diego, CA	L 0–7		
October 23	Compton JC		Hull Field; San Diego, CA	W 35–0		
October 30	UCLA		Hull Field; San Diego, CA	W 28–0	6,000–8,000	
November 6	No. 4 USC		Hull Field; San Diego, CA	W 10–7	6,000	
November 21	San Pedro All-Stars	No. 17	Hull Field; San Diego, CA	W 53–7	6,000	
November 28	at No. 9 March Field		Wheelock Field; Riverside, CA ("Army–Navy game of the West")	L 2–13	14,000	
Rankings from AP Poll released prior to the game

== Rankings ==
Ranking movements Legend: ██ Increase in ranking ██ Decrease in ranking — = Not ranked т = Tied with team above or below
	Week								
Poll	1	2	3	4	5	6	7	8	Final
AP	—	—	—	—	—	20	17т	—	—
