= 1943 Kearns Field Eagles football team =

American college football season

1943 Kearns Field Eagles football
- Conference: Independent
- Record: 5–2
- Head coach: Jimmy O'Brien (1st season)
- Home stadium: East High School stadium

1943 military service football records
	Conf.			Overall
Team	W	L	T	W		L		T
No. 17 Bainbridge		–		7	–	0	–	0
Bunker Hill NAS		–		6	–	0	–	0
Greensboro		–		4	–	0	–	0
Memphis NATTC		–		2	–	0	–	0
No. 2 Iowa Pre-Flight		–		9	–	1	–	0
No. 10 March Field		–		9	–	1	–	0
No. 8 Del Monte Pre-Flight		–		7	–	1	–	0
Randolph Field		–		9	–	1	–	1
Georgia Pre-Flight		–		5	–	1	–	0
No. 6 Great Lakes Navy		–		10	–	2	–	0
Lubbock AAF		–		5	–	1	–	0
Ottumwa NAS		–		5	–	1	–	0
Camp Davis		–		8	–	2	–	0
Sampson NTS		–		7	–	2	–	0
San Diego NTS		–		7	–	2	–	0
Keesler Field		–		3	–	1	–	0
Wright Field		–		1	–	0	–	1
Camp Lejeune		–		6	–	2	–	1
Fort Riley		–		6	–	2	–	1
Kearns Field		–		5	–	2	–	0
Fort Knox		–		4	–	2	–	0
Cherry Point Marines		–		4	–	2	–	1
Alameda Coast Guard		–		4	–	2	–	1
Fort Douglas		–		4	–	2	–	1
300th Infantry		–		5	–	3	–	0
176th Infantry		–		4	–	3	–	0
Blackland AAF		–		4	–	3	–	0
Fort Sheridan		–		4	–	3	–	0
Fort Warren		–		4	–	3	–	0
Norman NAS		–		4	–	3	–	0
Charleston Coast Guard		–		5	–	4	–	0
Salt Lake AAB		–		4	–	3	–	2
124th Infantry		–		2	–	2	–	0
Camp Kilmer		–		2	–	2	–	0
Camp Lee		–		5	–	5	–	0
Logan Navy		–		2	–	2	–	0
Spokane Air Service		–		2	–	2	–	0
Camp Edwards		–		4	–	5	–	0
Curtis Bay Coast Guard		–		4	–	5	–	0
Saint Mary's Pre-Flight		–		3	–	4	–	1
Jacksonville NATTC		–		3	–	4	–	0
Richmond AAB		–		4	–	6	–	1
Atlantic City NAS		–		2	–	3	–	0
North Carolina Pre-Flight		–		2	–	4	–	1
Patterson Field		–		2	–	4	–	1
Bowman Field		–		2	–	4	–	0
Kirtland Field		–		1	–	2	–	0
Lakehurst NAS		–		2	–	4	–	0
Camp Grant		–		2	–	6	–	2
Lowry Field		–		1	–	3	–	0
Fort Monroe		–		3	–	7	–	0
Daniel Field		–		2	–	7	–	0
Camp Gordon		–		1	–	4	–	0
South Plains AAF		–		1	–	4	–	0
Greenville AAB		–		1	–	5	–	0
Ward Island Marines		–		1	–	5	–	0
Bryan AAF		–		1	–	6	–	0
Pocatello AAB		–		0	–	3	–	0
Norfolk Fleet Marines		–		0	–	9	–	0
Rankings from AP Poll

The 1943 Kearns Field Eagles football team represented the United States Army Air Forces's Kearns Field, located in West Jordan, Utah, during the 1943 college football season. Led by head coach Jimmy O'Brien, the Eagles compiled a record of 5–2. O'Brien starred in three sports at the University of Idaho and coached at Pocatello High School in Pocatello, Idaho for four years.

In the final Litkenhous Ratings, Kearns Field ranked 127th among the nation's college and service teams with a rating of 58.7.

== Schedule ==
Date	Time	Opponent	Site	Result	Attendance	Source
October 8	8:00 p.m.	Salt Lake AAB	East High School stadium; Salt Lake City, UT	W 4–0	6,500	
October 15	8:00 p.m.	vs. Fort Douglas	East High School stadium; Salt Lake City, UT	L 0–6	6,500	
October 23		at Logan Navy	Aggie Stadium; Logan UT	W 20–0		
October 29	8:00 p.m.	Bushnell General Hospital	East High School stadium; Salt Lake City, UT	W 25–0	3,000	
November 5	8:00 p.m.	Logan Navy	East High School stadium; Salt Lake City, UT	cancelled		
November 11	2:00 p.m.	at Pocatello AAB	Pocatello, ID	W 19–0		
November 20	8:00 p.m.	vs. Fort Douglas	East High School stadium; Salt Lake City, UT	W 48–6		
November 28		at Salt Lake AAB	Community Park; Salt Lake City, UT	L 0–30	6,000	
All times are in Mountain time
