= 1943 Fort Monroe Gunners football team =

American college football season

1943 Fort Monroe Gunners football
- Conference: Independent
- Record: 3–7
- Head coach: Tody Riggs (1st season)

1943 military service football records
| | Conf. | | | Overall |
| Team | W | L | T | W | | L | | T |
|---|---|---|---|---|---|---|---|---|
| No. 17 Bainbridge | | – | | 7 | – | 0 | – | 0 |
| Bunker Hill NAS | | – | | 6 | – | 0 | – | 0 |
| Greensboro | | – | | 4 | – | 0 | – | 0 |
| Memphis NATTC | | – | | 2 | – | 0 | – | 0 |
| No. 2 Iowa Pre-Flight | | – | | 9 | – | 1 | – | 0 |
| No. 10 March Field | | – | | 9 | – | 1 | – | 0 |
| No. 8 Del Monte Pre-Flight | | – | | 7 | – | 1 | – | 0 |
| Randolph Field | | – | | 9 | – | 1 | – | 1 |
| Georgia Pre-Flight | | – | | 5 | – | 1 | – | 0 |
| No. 6 Great Lakes Navy | | – | | 10 | – | 2 | – | 0 |
| Lubbock AAF | | – | | 5 | – | 1 | – | 0 |
| Ottumwa NAS | | – | | 5 | – | 1 | – | 0 |
| Camp Davis | | – | | 8 | – | 2 | – | 0 |
| Sampson NTS | | – | | 7 | – | 2 | – | 0 |
| San Diego NTS | | – | | 7 | – | 2 | – | 0 |
| Keesler Field | | – | | 3 | – | 1 | – | 0 |
| Wright Field | | – | | 1 | – | 0 | – | 1 |
| Camp Lejeune | | – | | 6 | – | 2 | – | 1 |
| Fort Riley | | – | | 6 | – | 2 | – | 1 |
| Kearns Field | | – | | 5 | – | 2 | – | 0 |
| Fort Knox | | – | | 4 | – | 2 | – | 0 |
| Cherry Point Marines | | – | | 4 | – | 2 | – | 1 |
| Alameda Coast Guard | | – | | 4 | – | 2 | – | 1 |
| Fort Douglas | | – | | 4 | – | 2 | – | 1 |
| 300th Infantry | | – | | 5 | – | 3 | – | 0 |
| 176th Infantry | | – | | 4 | – | 3 | – | 0 |
| Blackland AAF | | – | | 4 | – | 3 | – | 0 |
| Fort Sheridan | | – | | 4 | – | 3 | – | 0 |
| Fort Warren | | – | | 4 | – | 3 | – | 0 |
| Norman NAS | | – | | 4 | – | 3 | – | 0 |
| Charleston Coast Guard | | – | | 5 | – | 4 | – | 0 |
| Salt Lake AAB | | – | | 4 | – | 3 | – | 2 |
| 124th Infantry | | – | | 2 | – | 2 | – | 0 |
| Camp Kilmer | | – | | 2 | – | 2 | – | 0 |
| Camp Lee | | – | | 5 | – | 5 | – | 0 |
| Logan Navy | | – | | 2 | – | 2 | – | 0 |
| Spokane Air Service | | – | | 2 | – | 2 | – | 0 |
| Camp Edwards | | – | | 4 | – | 5 | – | 0 |
| Curtis Bay Coast Guard | | – | | 4 | – | 5 | – | 0 |
| Saint Mary's Pre-Flight | | – | | 3 | – | 4 | – | 1 |
| Jacksonville NATTC | | – | | 3 | – | 4 | – | 0 |
| Richmond AAB | | – | | 4 | – | 6 | – | 1 |
| Atlantic City NAS | | – | | 2 | – | 3 | – | 0 |
| North Carolina Pre-Flight | | – | | 2 | – | 4 | – | 1 |
| Patterson Field | | – | | 2 | – | 4 | – | 1 |
| Bowman Field | | – | | 2 | – | 4 | – | 0 |
| Kirtland Field | | – | | 1 | – | 2 | – | 0 |
| Lakehurst NAS | | – | | 2 | – | 4 | – | 0 |
| Camp Grant | | – | | 2 | – | 6 | – | 2 |
| Lowry Field | | – | | 1 | – | 3 | – | 0 |
| Fort Monroe | | – | | 3 | – | 7 | – | 0 |
| Daniel Field | | – | | 2 | – | 7 | – | 0 |
| Camp Gordon | | – | | 1 | – | 4 | – | 0 |
| South Plains AAF | | – | | 1 | – | 4 | – | 0 |
| Greenville AAB | | – | | 1 | – | 5 | – | 0 |
| Ward Island Marines | | – | | 1 | – | 5 | – | 0 |
| Bryan AAF | | – | | 1 | – | 6 | – | 0 |
| Pocatello AAB | | – | | 0 | – | 3 | – | 0 |
| Norfolk Fleet Marines | | – | | 0 | – | 9 | – | 0 |
Rankings from AP Poll

The 1943 Fort Monroe Gunners football team represented the United States Army's Fort Monroe, located in Hampton, Virginia, during the 1943 college football season. Led by head coach Tody Riggs, the Gunners compiled a record of 3–7.

In the final Litkenhous Ratings, Fort Monroe ranked 183rd among the nation's college and service teams with a rating of 43.4.

== Schedule ==
| Date | Time | Opponent | Site | Result | Attendance | Source |
|---|---|---|---|---|---|---|
| September 17 | | at Apprentice | School stadium; Newport News, VA | L 0–14 | | |
| September 25 | | Norfolk Fleet Marines | Fort Monroe, VA | W 18–0 | | |
| October 3 | | at Richmond AAB | Richmond, VA | L 0–6 | | |
| October 9 | | Bainbridge | Fort Monroe, VA | L 0–57 | | |
| October 16 | 2:00 p.m. | at Camp Lejeune | New River, NC | L 0–51 | | |
| October 23 | | Curtis Bay Coast Guard | Fort Monroe, VA | L 6–13 | | |
| October 30 | 2:00 p.m. | Richmond AAB | Fort Story, VA | W 18–13 | | |
| November 6 | 2:30 p.m. | at Camp Davis | Camp Davis, NC | L 6–31 | 11,000 | |
| November 21 | 2:30 p.m. | at Norfolk Fleet Marines | Forman Field; Norfolk, VA | W 44–6 | | |
| November 28 | 2:00 p.m. | at Camp Lee | Camp Lee, VA | L 0–6 | | |
All times are in Eastern time
