= 1943 Camp Edwards Yanks football team =

American college football season

1943 Camp Edwards Yanks football
- Conference: Independent
- Record: 4–5
- Head coach: Clell Barton (1st season; first 6 games); Frank Palmisani (1st season, final 3 games)
- Captain: Hank Corrado
- Home stadium: Logan Field

1943 military service football records
	Conf.			Overall
Team	W	L	T	W		L		T
No. 17 Bainbridge		–		7	–	0	–	0
Bunker Hill NAS		–		6	–	0	–	0
Greensboro		–		4	–	0	–	0
Memphis NATTC		–		2	–	0	–	0
No. 2 Iowa Pre-Flight		–		9	–	1	–	0
No. 10 March Field		–		9	–	1	–	0
No. 8 Del Monte Pre-Flight		–		7	–	1	–	0
Randolph Field		–		9	–	1	–	1
Georgia Pre-Flight		–		5	–	1	–	0
No. 6 Great Lakes Navy		–		10	–	2	–	0
Lubbock AAF		–		5	–	1	–	0
Ottumwa NAS		–		5	–	1	–	0
Camp Davis		–		8	–	2	–	0
Sampson NTS		–		7	–	2	–	0
San Diego NTS		–		7	–	2	–	0
Keesler Field		–		3	–	1	–	0
Wright Field		–		1	–	0	–	1
Camp Lejeune		–		6	–	2	–	1
Fort Riley		–		6	–	2	–	1
Kearns Field		–		5	–	2	–	0
Fort Knox		–		4	–	2	–	0
Cherry Point Marines		–		4	–	2	–	1
Alameda Coast Guard		–		4	–	2	–	1
Fort Douglas		–		4	–	2	–	1
300th Infantry		–		5	–	3	–	0
176th Infantry		–		4	–	3	–	0
Blackland AAF		–		4	–	3	–	0
Fort Sheridan		–		4	–	3	–	0
Fort Warren		–		4	–	3	–	0
Norman NAS		–		4	–	3	–	0
Charleston Coast Guard		–		5	–	4	–	0
Salt Lake AAB		–		4	–	3	–	2
124th Infantry		–		2	–	2	–	0
Camp Kilmer		–		2	–	2	–	0
Camp Lee		–		5	–	5	–	0
Logan Navy		–		2	–	2	–	0
Spokane Air Service		–		2	–	2	–	0
Camp Edwards		–		4	–	5	–	0
Curtis Bay Coast Guard		–		4	–	5	–	0
Saint Mary's Pre-Flight		–		3	–	4	–	1
Jacksonville NATTC		–		3	–	4	–	0
Richmond AAB		–		4	–	6	–	1
Atlantic City NAS		–		2	–	3	–	0
North Carolina Pre-Flight		–		2	–	4	–	1
Patterson Field		–		2	–	4	–	1
Bowman Field		–		2	–	4	–	0
Kirtland Field		–		1	–	2	–	0
Lakehurst NAS		–		2	–	4	–	0
Camp Grant		–		2	–	6	–	2
Lowry Field		–		1	–	3	–	0
Fort Monroe		–		3	–	7	–	0
Daniel Field		–		2	–	7	–	0
Camp Gordon		–		1	–	4	–	0
South Plains AAF		–		1	–	4	–	0
Greenville AAB		–		1	–	5	–	0
Ward Island Marines		–		1	–	5	–	0
Bryan AAF		–		1	–	6	–	0
Pocatello AAB		–		0	–	3	–	0
Norfolk Fleet Marines		–		0	–	9	–	0
Rankings from AP Poll

The 1943 Camp Edwards Yanks football team represented the United States Army's Camp Edwards, located in Barnstable County, Massachusetts, during the 1943 college football season. Clell Barton was the team's head coach for the first six games of the season before he was transferred to another military post and succeeded by Lieutenant Frank Palmisani, an alumnus of the University of Notre Dame. The Yanks compiled an overall record of 4–5. The team's captain was Hank Corrado, who played football at Medford High School, which won a state championship in 1942. Bill Smaltz, who had played college football at Pennsylvania State University, was a fullback for the Yanks.

In the final Litkenhous Ratings, Fort Sheridan ranked 214th among the nation's college and service teams with a rating of 30.7.

== Schedule ==
Date	Time	Opponent	Site	Result	Attendance	Source
October 2	3:00 p.m.	Harvard	Logan Field; Camp Edwards, MA	L 0–7	10,000	
October 9	2:00 p.m.	at Bates	Garcelon Field; Lewiston, ME	L 7–13		
October 17	3:00 p.m.	Milford Merchants	Logan Field; Camp Edwards, MA	W 30–0	5,000	
October 23	2:00 p.m.	at Tufts	Tufts Oval; Medford, MA	L 7–18	2,000	
October 30		at WPI	Worcester, MA	L 6–21		
November 6	2:30 p.m.	at Harvard	Harvard Stadium; Boston, MA	L 7–14	4,500	
November 14		New Bedford Whalers	Camp Edwards, MA	W 35–0		
November		Murphy Club		W 34–0		
November		Fall River		W 20–18		
All times are in Eastern time
