= 1943 Ottumwa Naval Air Station Skyers football team =

American college football season

1943 Ottumwa Naval Air Station Skyers football
- Conference: Independent
- Record: 5–1
- Head coach: Jimmy Kitts (1st season)
- Home stadium: Schaefer Field

1943 military service football records
	Conf.			Overall
Team	W	L	T	W		L		T
No. 17 Bainbridge		–		7	–	0	–	0
Bunker Hill NAS		–		6	–	0	–	0
Greensboro		–		4	–	0	–	0
Memphis NATTC		–		2	–	0	–	0
No. 2 Iowa Pre-Flight		–		9	–	1	–	0
No. 10 March Field		–		9	–	1	–	0
No. 8 Del Monte Pre-Flight		–		7	–	1	–	0
Randolph Field		–		9	–	1	–	1
Georgia Pre-Flight		–		5	–	1	–	0
No. 6 Great Lakes Navy		–		10	–	2	–	0
Lubbock AAF		–		5	–	1	–	0
Ottumwa NAS		–		5	–	1	–	0
Camp Davis		–		8	–	2	–	0
Sampson NTS		–		7	–	2	–	0
San Diego NTS		–		7	–	2	–	0
Keesler Field		–		3	–	1	–	0
Wright Field		–		1	–	0	–	1
Camp Lejeune		–		6	–	2	–	1
Fort Riley		–		6	–	2	–	1
Kearns Field		–		5	–	2	–	0
Fort Knox		–		4	–	2	–	0
Cherry Point Marines		–		4	–	2	–	1
Alameda Coast Guard		–		4	–	2	–	1
Fort Douglas		–		4	–	2	–	1
300th Infantry		–		5	–	3	–	0
176th Infantry		–		4	–	3	–	0
Blackland AAF		–		4	–	3	–	0
Fort Sheridan		–		4	–	3	–	0
Fort Warren		–		4	–	3	–	0
Norman NAS		–		4	–	3	–	0
Charleston Coast Guard		–		5	–	4	–	0
Salt Lake AAB		–		4	–	3	–	2
124th Infantry		–		2	–	2	–	0
Camp Kilmer		–		2	–	2	–	0
Camp Lee		–		5	–	5	–	0
Logan Navy		–		2	–	2	–	0
Spokane Air Service		–		2	–	2	–	0
Camp Edwards		–		4	–	5	–	0
Curtis Bay Coast Guard		–		4	–	5	–	0
Saint Mary's Pre-Flight		–		3	–	4	–	1
Jacksonville NATTC		–		3	–	4	–	0
Richmond AAB		–		4	–	6	–	1
Atlantic City NAS		–		2	–	3	–	0
North Carolina Pre-Flight		–		2	–	4	–	1
Patterson Field		–		2	–	4	–	1
Bowman Field		–		2	–	4	–	0
Kirtland Field		–		1	–	2	–	0
Lakehurst NAS		–		2	–	4	–	0
Camp Grant		–		2	–	6	–	2
Lowry Field		–		1	–	3	–	0
Fort Monroe		–		3	–	7	–	0
Daniel Field		–		2	–	7	–	0
Camp Gordon		–		1	–	4	–	0
South Plains AAF		–		1	–	4	–	0
Greenville AAB		–		1	–	5	–	0
Ward Island Marines		–		1	–	5	–	0
Bryan AAF		–		1	–	6	–	0
Pocatello AAB		–		0	–	3	–	0
Norfolk Fleet Marines		–		0	–	9	–	0
Rankings from AP Poll

The 1943 Ottumwa Naval Air Station Skyers football team, sometimes called the "Sea Flyers", represented Ottumwa Naval Air Station (Ottumwa NAS), located near Ottumwa, Iowa, during the 1943 college football season. Led by head coach Jimmy Kitts, the Skyers compiled a record of 5–1.

In the final Litkenhous Ratings, Ottumwa NAS ranked 74th among the nation's college and service teams with a rating of 75.6.

== Schedule ==
Date	Time	Opponent	Site	Result	Attendance	Source
September 26		at Iowa Pre-Flight B team	Iowa Stadium; Iowa City, IA	W 14–6	800	
October 10	2:00 p.m.	Fort Crook	Ottumwa High School Stadium; Ottumwa, IA	W 29–0		
October 17	3:00 p.m.	Iowa Pre-Flight B team	Schaefer Field; Ottumwa, IA	W 13–0	6,000	
October 23	8:00 p.m.	Iowa State	Ottumwa, IA	W 13–12	4,500	
October 31	2:00 p.m.	Bunker Hill NAS	Schaefer Field; Ottumwa, IA	L 13–19	6,500	
November 14		at Iowa State Prison	Fort Madison, IA	W 54–0	1,500	
All times are in Central time
