= 1943 Daniel Field Fliers football team =

American college football season

1943 Daniel Field Fliers football
- Conference: Independent
- Record: 2–7
- Head coach: Hank Stovall (1st season)
- Home stadium: Richmond Academy Stadium

1943 military service football records
	Conf.			Overall
Team	W	L	T	W		L		T
No. 17 Bainbridge		–		7	–	0	–	0
Bunker Hill NAS		–		6	–	0	–	0
Greensboro		–		4	–	0	–	0
Memphis NATTC		–		2	–	0	–	0
No. 2 Iowa Pre-Flight		–		9	–	1	–	0
No. 10 March Field		–		9	–	1	–	0
No. 8 Del Monte Pre-Flight		–		7	–	1	–	0
Randolph Field		–		9	–	1	–	1
Georgia Pre-Flight		–		5	–	1	–	0
No. 6 Great Lakes Navy		–		10	–	2	–	0
Lubbock AAF		–		5	–	1	–	0
Ottumwa NAS		–		5	–	1	–	0
Camp Davis		–		8	–	2	–	0
Sampson NTS		–		7	–	2	–	0
San Diego NTS		–		7	–	2	–	0
Keesler Field		–		3	–	1	–	0
Wright Field		–		1	–	0	–	1
Camp Lejeune		–		6	–	2	–	1
Fort Riley		–		6	–	2	–	1
Kearns Field		–		5	–	2	–	0
Fort Knox		–		4	–	2	–	0
Cherry Point Marines		–		4	–	2	–	1
Alameda Coast Guard		–		4	–	2	–	1
Fort Douglas		–		4	–	2	–	1
300th Infantry		–		5	–	3	–	0
176th Infantry		–		4	–	3	–	0
Blackland AAF		–		4	–	3	–	0
Fort Sheridan		–		4	–	3	–	0
Fort Warren		–		4	–	3	–	0
Norman NAS		–		4	–	3	–	0
Charleston Coast Guard		–		5	–	4	–	0
Salt Lake AAB		–		4	–	3	–	2
124th Infantry		–		2	–	2	–	0
Camp Kilmer		–		2	–	2	–	0
Camp Lee		–		5	–	5	–	0
Logan Navy		–		2	–	2	–	0
Spokane Air Service		–		2	–	2	–	0
Camp Edwards		–		4	–	5	–	0
Curtis Bay Coast Guard		–		4	–	5	–	0
Saint Mary's Pre-Flight		–		3	–	4	–	1
Jacksonville NATTC		–		3	–	4	–	0
Richmond AAB		–		4	–	6	–	1
Atlantic City NAS		–		2	–	3	–	0
North Carolina Pre-Flight		–		2	–	4	–	1
Patterson Field		–		2	–	4	–	1
Bowman Field		–		2	–	4	–	0
Kirtland Field		–		1	–	2	–	0
Lakehurst NAS		–		2	–	4	–	0
Camp Grant		–		2	–	6	–	2
Lowry Field		–		1	–	3	–	0
Fort Monroe		–		3	–	7	–	0
Daniel Field		–		2	–	7	–	0
Camp Gordon		–		1	–	4	–	0
South Plains AAF		–		1	–	4	–	0
Greenville AAB		–		1	–	5	–	0
Ward Island Marines		–		1	–	5	–	0
Bryan AAF		–		1	–	6	–	0
Pocatello AAB		–		0	–	3	–	0
Norfolk Fleet Marines		–		0	–	9	–	0
Rankings from AP Poll

The 1943 Daniel Field Fliers football team represented United States Army Air Forces' Daniel Field, located near Augusta, Georgia, during the 1943 college football season. Led by head coach Hank Stovall, the Fliers compiled a record of 2–7.

In the final Litkenhous Ratings, Daniel Field ranked 112th among the nation's college and service teams with a rating of 62.7.

== Schedule ==
Date	Time	Opponent	Site	Result	Attendance	Source
October 2		Georgia Pre-Flight	Sanford Stadium; Athens, GA	L 13–19	5,000	
October 9		300th Infantry	Augusta, GA	L 6–39		
October 16		No. 20 Georgia	Richmond Academy Stadium; Augusta, GA	W 18–7	5,000	
October 24		Presbyterian	Richmond Academy Stadium; Augusta, GA	W 40–14	4,000	
October 31	2:00 p.m.	at 300th Infantry	Doughboy Stadium; Fort Benning, GA	L 7–47	18,000	
November 6		176th Infantry	Augusta, GA	L 7–48		
November 13		at Jacksonville NATTC	Jacksonville, FL	L 0–44	5,000	
November 20		at Camp Davis	Camp Davis, NC	L 0–41	15,000	
December 4		vs. Camp Gordon	Augusta, GA	L 13–14	5,000	
Rankings from AP Poll released prior to the game; All times are in Eastern time
