= 1943 Camp Kilmer Eagles football team =

American college football season

1943 Camp Kilmer Eagles football
- Conference: Independent
- Record: 2–2
- Head coach: Jack Bremner (1st season)
- Home stadium: Rutgers Stadium

1943 military service football records
| | Conf. | | | Overall |
| Team | W | L | T | W | | L | | T |
|---|---|---|---|---|---|---|---|---|
| No. 17 Bainbridge | | – | | 7 | – | 0 | – | 0 |
| Bunker Hill NAS | | – | | 6 | – | 0 | – | 0 |
| Greensboro | | – | | 4 | – | 0 | – | 0 |
| Memphis NATTC | | – | | 2 | – | 0 | – | 0 |
| No. 2 Iowa Pre-Flight | | – | | 9 | – | 1 | – | 0 |
| No. 10 March Field | | – | | 9 | – | 1 | – | 0 |
| No. 8 Del Monte Pre-Flight | | – | | 7 | – | 1 | – | 0 |
| Randolph Field | | – | | 9 | – | 1 | – | 1 |
| Georgia Pre-Flight | | – | | 5 | – | 1 | – | 0 |
| No. 6 Great Lakes Navy | | – | | 10 | – | 2 | – | 0 |
| Lubbock AAF | | – | | 5 | – | 1 | – | 0 |
| Ottumwa NAS | | – | | 5 | – | 1 | – | 0 |
| Camp Davis | | – | | 8 | – | 2 | – | 0 |
| Sampson NTS | | – | | 7 | – | 2 | – | 0 |
| San Diego NTS | | – | | 7 | – | 2 | – | 0 |
| Keesler Field | | – | | 3 | – | 1 | – | 0 |
| Wright Field | | – | | 1 | – | 0 | – | 1 |
| Camp Lejeune | | – | | 6 | – | 2 | – | 1 |
| Fort Riley | | – | | 6 | – | 2 | – | 1 |
| Kearns Field | | – | | 5 | – | 2 | – | 0 |
| Fort Knox | | – | | 4 | – | 2 | – | 0 |
| Cherry Point Marines | | – | | 4 | – | 2 | – | 1 |
| Alameda Coast Guard | | – | | 4 | – | 2 | – | 1 |
| Fort Douglas | | – | | 4 | – | 2 | – | 1 |
| 300th Infantry | | – | | 5 | – | 3 | – | 0 |
| 176th Infantry | | – | | 4 | – | 3 | – | 0 |
| Blackland AAF | | – | | 4 | – | 3 | – | 0 |
| Fort Sheridan | | – | | 4 | – | 3 | – | 0 |
| Fort Warren | | – | | 4 | – | 3 | – | 0 |
| Norman NAS | | – | | 4 | – | 3 | – | 0 |
| Charleston Coast Guard | | – | | 5 | – | 4 | – | 0 |
| Salt Lake AAB | | – | | 4 | – | 3 | – | 2 |
| 124th Infantry | | – | | 2 | – | 2 | – | 0 |
| Camp Kilmer | | – | | 2 | – | 2 | – | 0 |
| Camp Lee | | – | | 5 | – | 5 | – | 0 |
| Logan Navy | | – | | 2 | – | 2 | – | 0 |
| Spokane Air Service | | – | | 2 | – | 2 | – | 0 |
| Camp Edwards | | – | | 4 | – | 5 | – | 0 |
| Curtis Bay Coast Guard | | – | | 4 | – | 5 | – | 0 |
| Saint Mary's Pre-Flight | | – | | 3 | – | 4 | – | 1 |
| Jacksonville NATTC | | – | | 3 | – | 4 | – | 0 |
| Richmond AAB | | – | | 4 | – | 6 | – | 1 |
| Atlantic City NAS | | – | | 2 | – | 3 | – | 0 |
| North Carolina Pre-Flight | | – | | 2 | – | 4 | – | 1 |
| Patterson Field | | – | | 2 | – | 4 | – | 1 |
| Bowman Field | | – | | 2 | – | 4 | – | 0 |
| Kirtland Field | | – | | 1 | – | 2 | – | 0 |
| Lakehurst NAS | | – | | 2 | – | 4 | – | 0 |
| Camp Grant | | – | | 2 | – | 6 | – | 2 |
| Lowry Field | | – | | 1 | – | 3 | – | 0 |
| Fort Monroe | | – | | 3 | – | 7 | – | 0 |
| Daniel Field | | – | | 2 | – | 7 | – | 0 |
| Camp Gordon | | – | | 1 | – | 4 | – | 0 |
| South Plains AAF | | – | | 1 | – | 4 | – | 0 |
| Greenville AAB | | – | | 1 | – | 5 | – | 0 |
| Ward Island Marines | | – | | 1 | – | 5 | – | 0 |
| Bryan AAF | | – | | 1 | – | 6 | – | 0 |
| Pocatello AAB | | – | | 0 | – | 3 | – | 0 |
| Norfolk Fleet Marines | | – | | 0 | – | 9 | – | 0 |
Rankings from AP Poll

The 1943 Camp Kilmer Eagles football team represented the United States Army's Camp Kilmer, located near New Brunswick, New Jersey, during the 1943 college football season. Led by head coach Jack Bremner, the Eagles compiled a record of 2–2. Bremner had played college football at Colgate University. Jim Kissell, who played football at Boston College, was an assistant coach and player for the team.

In the final Litkenhous Ratings, Lakehurst NAS ranked 240th among the nation's college and service teams with a rating of 17.7.

== Schedule ==
| Date | Time | Opponent | Site | Result | Attendance | Source |
|---|---|---|---|---|---|---|
| October 23 | | at Brown | Brown Stadium; Providence, RI | L 3–62 | | |
| October 30 | | at CCNY | Lewisohn Stadium; New York, NY | W 13–12 | 500 | |
| November 14 | | Lakehurst NAS | Rutgers Stadium; Piscataway, NJ | L 12–26 | | |
| November 21 | 2:15 p.m. | Brooklyn | Rutgers Stadium; Piscataway, NJ | W 47–7 | 3,000 | |
