= 1943 Bowman Field Bombers football team =

American college football season

1943 Bowman Field Bombers football
- Conference: Independent
- Record: 2–4
- Head coach: Bill Stein (1st season)
- Home stadium: duPont Manual Stadium

1943 military service football records
	Conf.			Overall
Team	W	L	T	W		L		T
No. 17 Bainbridge		–		7	–	0	–	0
Bunker Hill NAS		–		6	–	0	–	0
Greensboro		–		4	–	0	–	0
Memphis NATTC		–		2	–	0	–	0
No. 2 Iowa Pre-Flight		–		9	–	1	–	0
No. 10 March Field		–		9	–	1	–	0
No. 8 Del Monte Pre-Flight		–		7	–	1	–	0
Randolph Field		–		9	–	1	–	1
Georgia Pre-Flight		–		5	–	1	–	0
No. 6 Great Lakes Navy		–		10	–	2	–	0
Lubbock AAF		–		5	–	1	–	0
Ottumwa NAS		–		5	–	1	–	0
Camp Davis		–		8	–	2	–	0
Sampson NTS		–		7	–	2	–	0
San Diego NTS		–		7	–	2	–	0
Keesler Field		–		3	–	1	–	0
Wright Field		–		1	–	0	–	1
Camp Lejeune		–		6	–	2	–	1
Fort Riley		–		6	–	2	–	1
Kearns Field		–		5	–	2	–	0
Fort Knox		–		4	–	2	–	0
Cherry Point Marines		–		4	–	2	–	1
Alameda Coast Guard		–		4	–	2	–	1
Fort Douglas		–		4	–	2	–	1
300th Infantry		–		5	–	3	–	0
176th Infantry		–		4	–	3	–	0
Blackland AAF		–		4	–	3	–	0
Fort Sheridan		–		4	–	3	–	0
Fort Warren		–		4	–	3	–	0
Norman NAS		–		4	–	3	–	0
Charleston Coast Guard		–		5	–	4	–	0
Salt Lake AAB		–		4	–	3	–	2
124th Infantry		–		2	–	2	–	0
Camp Kilmer		–		2	–	2	–	0
Camp Lee		–		5	–	5	–	0
Logan Navy		–		2	–	2	–	0
Spokane Air Service		–		2	–	2	–	0
Camp Edwards		–		4	–	5	–	0
Curtis Bay Coast Guard		–		4	–	5	–	0
Saint Mary's Pre-Flight		–		3	–	4	–	1
Jacksonville NATTC		–		3	–	4	–	0
Richmond AAB		–		4	–	6	–	1
Atlantic City NAS		–		2	–	3	–	0
North Carolina Pre-Flight		–		2	–	4	–	1
Patterson Field		–		2	–	4	–	1
Bowman Field		–		2	–	4	–	0
Kirtland Field		–		1	–	2	–	0
Lakehurst NAS		–		2	–	4	–	0
Camp Grant		–		2	–	6	–	2
Lowry Field		–		1	–	3	–	0
Fort Monroe		–		3	–	7	–	0
Daniel Field		–		2	–	7	–	0
Camp Gordon		–		1	–	4	–	0
South Plains AAF		–		1	–	4	–	0
Greenville AAB		–		1	–	5	–	0
Ward Island Marines		–		1	–	5	–	0
Bryan AAF		–		1	–	6	–	0
Pocatello AAB		–		0	–	3	–	0
Norfolk Fleet Marines		–		0	–	9	–	0
Rankings from AP Poll

The 1943 Bowman Field Bombers football team represented the United States Army Air Forces's First Troop Carrier Company at Bowman Field, located near Louisville, Kentucky, during the 1943 college football season. Led by head coach Bill Stein, the Bombers compiled a record of 2–4. Stein had played college football at the University of Oregon and coached at high schools and colleges in the Western United States. Lieutenant Joe Murphy, who had played at Georgia Tech, was the team's backfield coach.

In the final Litkenhous Ratings, Bowman Field ranked 204th among the nation's college and service teams with a rating of 35.6.

== Schedule ==
Date	Time	Opponent	Site	Result	Attendance	Source
October 10	2:30 p.m.	Fort Knox	duPont Manual Stadium; Louisville, KY	L 6–13	6,500	
October 17	2:30 p.m.	at Patterson Field	University of Dayton Stadium; Dayton, OH	L 6–10	3,566	
October 24	2:00 p.m.	Indiana State	duPont Manual Stadium; Louisville, KY	W 12–0	1,200	
October 31		at Fort Knox	Fort Knox, KY	L 0–19	7,500	
November 7		at Gardiner Hospital	Chicago, IL	W 13–0		
November 21	2:30 p.m.	Wright Field	duPont Manual Stadium; Louisville, KY	L 9–13	5,000	
All times are in Eastern time
