= 1943 Lubbock Army Air Field Fliers football team =

American college football season

1943 Lubbock Army Air Field Fliers football
- Conference: Independent
- Record: 5–1
- Head coach: G. B. Morris & Albert Wirz (1st season)
- Home stadium: Tech Field

1943 military service football records
	Conf.			Overall
Team	W	L	T	W		L		T
No. 17 Bainbridge		–		7	–	0	–	0
Bunker Hill NAS		–		6	–	0	–	0
Greensboro		–		4	–	0	–	0
Memphis NATTC		–		2	–	0	–	0
No. 2 Iowa Pre-Flight		–		9	–	1	–	0
No. 10 March Field		–		9	–	1	–	0
No. 8 Del Monte Pre-Flight		–		7	–	1	–	0
Randolph Field		–		9	–	1	–	1
Georgia Pre-Flight		–		5	–	1	–	0
No. 6 Great Lakes Navy		–		10	–	2	–	0
Lubbock AAF		–		5	–	1	–	0
Ottumwa NAS		–		5	–	1	–	0
Camp Davis		–		8	–	2	–	0
Sampson NTS		–		7	–	2	–	0
San Diego NTS		–		7	–	2	–	0
Keesler Field		–		3	–	1	–	0
Wright Field		–		1	–	0	–	1
Camp Lejeune		–		6	–	2	–	1
Fort Riley		–		6	–	2	–	1
Kearns Field		–		5	–	2	–	0
Fort Knox		–		4	–	2	–	0
Cherry Point Marines		–		4	–	2	–	1
Alameda Coast Guard		–		4	–	2	–	1
Fort Douglas		–		4	–	2	–	1
300th Infantry		–		5	–	3	–	0
176th Infantry		–		4	–	3	–	0
Blackland AAF		–		4	–	3	–	0
Fort Sheridan		–		4	–	3	–	0
Fort Warren		–		4	–	3	–	0
Norman NAS		–		4	–	3	–	0
Charleston Coast Guard		–		5	–	4	–	0
Salt Lake AAB		–		4	–	3	–	2
124th Infantry		–		2	–	2	–	0
Camp Kilmer		–		2	–	2	–	0
Camp Lee		–		5	–	5	–	0
Logan Navy		–		2	–	2	–	0
Spokane Air Service		–		2	–	2	–	0
Camp Edwards		–		4	–	5	–	0
Curtis Bay Coast Guard		–		4	–	5	–	0
Saint Mary's Pre-Flight		–		3	–	4	–	1
Jacksonville NATTC		–		3	–	4	–	0
Richmond AAB		–		4	–	6	–	1
Atlantic City NAS		–		2	–	3	–	0
North Carolina Pre-Flight		–		2	–	4	–	1
Patterson Field		–		2	–	4	–	1
Bowman Field		–		2	–	4	–	0
Kirtland Field		–		1	–	2	–	0
Lakehurst NAS		–		2	–	4	–	0
Camp Grant		–		2	–	6	–	2
Lowry Field		–		1	–	3	–	0
Fort Monroe		–		3	–	7	–	0
Daniel Field		–		2	–	7	–	0
Camp Gordon		–		1	–	4	–	0
South Plains AAF		–		1	–	4	–	0
Greenville AAB		–		1	–	5	–	0
Ward Island Marines		–		1	–	5	–	0
Bryan AAF		–		1	–	6	–	0
Pocatello AAB		–		0	–	3	–	0
Norfolk Fleet Marines		–		0	–	9	–	0
Rankings from AP Poll

The 1943 Lubbock Army Air Field Fliers football team represented the United States Army Air Forces's Lubbock Army Air Field (Lubbock AAF or LAAF), located near Lubbock, Texas, during the 1943 college football season. Led by coaches G. B. Morris and Albert Wirz, the Fliers compiled a record of 5–1.

In the final Litkenhous Ratings, Lubbock AAF ranked 98th among the nation's college and service teams with a rating of 67.1.

== Schedule ==
Date	Time	Opponent	Site	Result	Attendance	Source
September 18	8:15 p.m.	at Texas Tech	Tech Field; Lubbock, TX	L 14–26	8,000	
October 3	3:00 p.m.	vs. South Plains AAF	Tech Field; Lubbock, TX	W 27–12		
October 10	3:00 p.m.	Fort Bliss	Tech Field; Lubbock, TX	W 47–7		
October 23	8:15 p.m.	at Texas Tech	Tech Field; Lubbock, TX	W 10–7		
October 30	8:15 p.m.	Norman NAS	Tech Field; Lubbock, TX	W 13–0		
November 21	2:30 p.m.	Camp Barkeley 778th Tank Battalion	Tech Field; Lubbock, TX	W 46–6		
All times are in Central time
