= 1943 Fort Douglas GIs football team =

American college football season

1943 Fort Douglas GIs football
- Conference: Independent
- Record: 4–2–1
- Head coach: Bob Bjorklund (1st season)
- Home stadium: East High School stadium

1943 military service football records
	Conf.			Overall
Team	W	L	T	W		L		T
No. 17 Bainbridge		–		7	–	0	–	0
Bunker Hill NAS		–		6	–	0	–	0
Greensboro		–		4	–	0	–	0
Memphis NATTC		–		2	–	0	–	0
No. 2 Iowa Pre-Flight		–		9	–	1	–	0
No. 10 March Field		–		9	–	1	–	0
No. 8 Del Monte Pre-Flight		–		7	–	1	–	0
Randolph Field		–		9	–	1	–	1
Georgia Pre-Flight		–		5	–	1	–	0
No. 6 Great Lakes Navy		–		10	–	2	–	0
Lubbock AAF		–		5	–	1	–	0
Ottumwa NAS		–		5	–	1	–	0
Camp Davis		–		8	–	2	–	0
Sampson NTS		–		7	–	2	–	0
San Diego NTS		–		7	–	2	–	0
Keesler Field		–		3	–	1	–	0
Wright Field		–		1	–	0	–	1
Camp Lejeune		–		6	–	2	–	1
Fort Riley		–		6	–	2	–	1
Kearns Field		–		5	–	2	–	0
Fort Knox		–		4	–	2	–	0
Cherry Point Marines		–		4	–	2	–	1
Alameda Coast Guard		–		4	–	2	–	1
Fort Douglas		–		4	–	2	–	1
300th Infantry		–		5	–	3	–	0
176th Infantry		–		4	–	3	–	0
Blackland AAF		–		4	–	3	–	0
Fort Sheridan		–		4	–	3	–	0
Fort Warren		–		4	–	3	–	0
Norman NAS		–		4	–	3	–	0
Charleston Coast Guard		–		5	–	4	–	0
Salt Lake AAB		–		4	–	3	–	2
124th Infantry		–		2	–	2	–	0
Camp Kilmer		–		2	–	2	–	0
Camp Lee		–		5	–	5	–	0
Logan Navy		–		2	–	2	–	0
Spokane Air Service		–		2	–	2	–	0
Camp Edwards		–		4	–	5	–	0
Curtis Bay Coast Guard		–		4	–	5	–	0
Saint Mary's Pre-Flight		–		3	–	4	–	1
Jacksonville NATTC		–		3	–	4	–	0
Richmond AAB		–		4	–	6	–	1
Atlantic City NAS		–		2	–	3	–	0
North Carolina Pre-Flight		–		2	–	4	–	1
Patterson Field		–		2	–	4	–	1
Bowman Field		–		2	–	4	–	0
Kirtland Field		–		1	–	2	–	0
Lakehurst NAS		–		2	–	4	–	0
Camp Grant		–		2	–	6	–	2
Lowry Field		–		1	–	3	–	0
Fort Monroe		–		3	–	7	–	0
Daniel Field		–		2	–	7	–	0
Camp Gordon		–		1	–	4	–	0
South Plains AAF		–		1	–	4	–	0
Greenville AAB		–		1	–	5	–	0
Ward Island Marines		–		1	–	5	–	0
Bryan AAF		–		1	–	6	–	0
Pocatello AAB		–		0	–	3	–	0
Norfolk Fleet Marines		–		0	–	9	–	0
Rankings from AP Poll

The 1943 Fort Douglas GIs football team represented the United States Army base at Fort Douglas, located in Salt Lake City, during the 1943 college football season. Led by head coach Bob Bjorklund, the GIs compiled a record of 4–2–1. The team's roster included Bob Paffrath. Fort Douglas played home games at East High School stadium.

In the final Litkenhous Ratings, Fort Douglas ranked 130th among the nation's college and service teams with a rating of 57.6.

== Schedule ==
Date	Time	Opponent	Site	Result	Attendance	Source
October 3	2:30 p.m.	vs. Salt Lake AAB	State fairgrounds gridiron; Salt Lake City, UT	T 0–0		
October 15	8:00 p.m.	vs. Kearns Field	East High School stadium; Salt Lake City, UT	W 6–0	6,500	
October 23	8:00 p.m.	Bushnell General Hospital	East High School stadium; Salt Lake City, UT	W 13–0	3,000	
October 30	2:30 p.m.	at Logan Navy	Aggie Stadium; Logan UT	W 13–12		
November 7		at Pocatello AAB	Pocatello, ID	W 13–9		
November 14	2:00 p.m.	at Salt Lake AAB	Community Park; Salt Lake City, UT	L 6–25	6,500	
November 20	8:00 p.m.	vs. Kearns Field	East High School stadium; Salt Lake City, UT	L 6–48		
November 28		at Fort Warren	Cheyenne, WY	cancelled		
All times are in Mountain time
