= 1943 Ward Island Marines Raiders football team =

American college football season

1943 Ward Island Marines Raiders football
- Conference: Independent
- Record: 1–5
- Head coach: Don Plato (1st season)
- Home stadium: Buccaneer Stadium

1943 military service football records
	Conf.			Overall
Team	W	L	T	W		L		T
No. 17 Bainbridge		–		7	–	0	–	0
Bunker Hill NAS		–		6	–	0	–	0
Greensboro		–		4	–	0	–	0
Memphis NATTC		–		2	–	0	–	0
No. 2 Iowa Pre-Flight		–		9	–	1	–	0
No. 10 March Field		–		9	–	1	–	0
No. 8 Del Monte Pre-Flight		–		7	–	1	–	0
Randolph Field		–		9	–	1	–	1
Georgia Pre-Flight		–		5	–	1	–	0
No. 6 Great Lakes Navy		–		10	–	2	–	0
Lubbock AAF		–		5	–	1	–	0
Ottumwa NAS		–		5	–	1	–	0
Camp Davis		–		8	–	2	–	0
Sampson NTS		–		7	–	2	–	0
San Diego NTS		–		7	–	2	–	0
Keesler Field		–		3	–	1	–	0
Wright Field		–		1	–	0	–	1
Camp Lejeune		–		6	–	2	–	1
Fort Riley		–		6	–	2	–	1
Kearns Field		–		5	–	2	–	0
Fort Knox		–		4	–	2	–	0
Cherry Point Marines		–		4	–	2	–	1
Alameda Coast Guard		–		4	–	2	–	1
Fort Douglas		–		4	–	2	–	1
300th Infantry		–		5	–	3	–	0
176th Infantry		–		4	–	3	–	0
Blackland AAF		–		4	–	3	–	0
Fort Sheridan		–		4	–	3	–	0
Fort Warren		–		4	–	3	–	0
Norman NAS		–		4	–	3	–	0
Charleston Coast Guard		–		5	–	4	–	0
Salt Lake AAB		–		4	–	3	–	2
124th Infantry		–		2	–	2	–	0
Camp Kilmer		–		2	–	2	–	0
Camp Lee		–		5	–	5	–	0
Logan Navy		–		2	–	2	–	0
Spokane Air Service		–		2	–	2	–	0
Camp Edwards		–		4	–	5	–	0
Curtis Bay Coast Guard		–		4	–	5	–	0
Saint Mary's Pre-Flight		–		3	–	4	–	1
Jacksonville NATTC		–		3	–	4	–	0
Richmond AAB		–		4	–	6	–	1
Atlantic City NAS		–		2	–	3	–	0
North Carolina Pre-Flight		–		2	–	4	–	1
Patterson Field		–		2	–	4	–	1
Bowman Field		–		2	–	4	–	0
Kirtland Field		–		1	–	2	–	0
Lakehurst NAS		–		2	–	4	–	0
Camp Grant		–		2	–	6	–	2
Lowry Field		–		1	–	3	–	0
Fort Monroe		–		3	–	7	–	0
Daniel Field		–		2	–	7	–	0
Camp Gordon		–		1	–	4	–	0
South Plains AAF		–		1	–	4	–	0
Greenville AAB		–		1	–	5	–	0
Ward Island Marines		–		1	–	5	–	0
Bryan AAF		–		1	–	6	–	0
Pocatello AAB		–		0	–	3	–	0
Norfolk Fleet Marines		–		0	–	9	–	0
Rankings from AP Poll

The 1943 Ward Island Marines Raiders football team represented the United States Marine Corps at Naval Air Technical Training Center Ward Island, located on Ward Island near Corpus Christi, Texas, during the 1943 college football season. Led by head coach Don Plato, the Raiders compiled a record of 1–5. "Red" Monson was an assistant coach for the team.

In the final Litkenhous Ratings, Ward Island Marines ranked 199th among the nation's college and service teams with a rating of 37.5.

== Schedule ==
Date	Time	Opponent	Site	Result	Attendance	Source
September 25	4:30 p.m.	Southwestern (TX)	Buccaneer Stadium; Corpus Christi, TX	L 0–54	5,000	
October 2		at Randolph Field	Grater Field; Randolph Field, TX	L 9–39		
October 10		at Blackland AAF	Municipal Stadium; Waco, TX	L 6–19		
October 30		Camp Hearne	Buccaneer Stadium; Corpus Christi, TX	W 32–0		
November 13	2:30 p.m.	Randolph Field	Buccaneer Stadium; Corpus Christi, TX	L 14–53		
November 21		at Camp Hearne	Wood Field; Hearne, TX	L 6–7		
All times are in Central time
