= Lloyd Reese =

American gridiron football player (1920–1981)

Profile
- Positions: Fullback, guard

Personal information
- Born: July 17, 1920; New Philadelphia, Ohio, U.S.
- Died: October 28, 1981 (aged 61); Dover, Ohio, U.S.

Career information
- College: Tennessee

Career history
- 1946: Chicago Bears
- 1948–1949: Montreal Alouettes

Awards and highlights
- NFL champion (1946); Grey Cup champion (1949); East All-Star (1948)

Lloyd "Bronco" Reese (July 17, 1920 – October 28, 1981) was an American gridiron football player. He was all-star and Grey Cup champion in Canadian pro football and a National Football League (NFL) champion. Reese played primarily as fullback, but also starred on the offensive line.

A graduate of University of Tennessee, Reese played on the 1943 Patterson Field All-Stars football team. He joined the Chicago Bears for their 1946 championship season, playing three games and rushing 18 times for 84 yards.

In 1948, Reese joined the Montreal Alouettes, where his 251-pound (114 kg) frame made him the biggest fullback in Canadian pro football. Playing a full 12-game season he was selected as an All-Star at guard. In 1949, he played another full sked, helping the Larks to their first ever Grey Cup championship.

Reese died on October 28, 1981, in Dover, Ohio.
