= 1943 Salt Lake Army Air Base Wings football team =

American college football season

1943 Salt Lake Army Air Base Wings football
- Conference: Independent
- Record: 4–3–2
- Head coach: Don Galbreath (1st season)
- Home stadium: Community Park

1943 military service football records
	Conf.			Overall
Team	W	L	T	W		L		T
No. 17 Bainbridge		–		7	–	0	–	0
Bunker Hill NAS		–		6	–	0	–	0
Greensboro		–		4	–	0	–	0
Memphis NATTC		–		2	–	0	–	0
No. 2 Iowa Pre-Flight		–		9	–	1	–	0
No. 10 March Field		–		9	–	1	–	0
No. 8 Del Monte Pre-Flight		–		7	–	1	–	0
Randolph Field		–		9	–	1	–	1
Georgia Pre-Flight		–		5	–	1	–	0
No. 6 Great Lakes Navy		–		10	–	2	–	0
Lubbock AAF		–		5	–	1	–	0
Ottumwa NAS		–		5	–	1	–	0
Camp Davis		–		8	–	2	–	0
Sampson NTS		–		7	–	2	–	0
San Diego NTS		–		7	–	2	–	0
Keesler Field		–		3	–	1	–	0
Wright Field		–		1	–	0	–	1
Camp Lejeune		–		6	–	2	–	1
Fort Riley		–		6	–	2	–	1
Kearns Field		–		5	–	2	–	0
Fort Knox		–		4	–	2	–	0
Cherry Point Marines		–		4	–	2	–	1
Alameda Coast Guard		–		4	–	2	–	1
Fort Douglas		–		4	–	2	–	1
300th Infantry		–		5	–	3	–	0
176th Infantry		–		4	–	3	–	0
Blackland AAF		–		4	–	3	–	0
Fort Sheridan		–		4	–	3	–	0
Fort Warren		–		4	–	3	–	0
Norman NAS		–		4	–	3	–	0
Charleston Coast Guard		–		5	–	4	–	0
Salt Lake AAB		–		4	–	3	–	2
124th Infantry		–		2	–	2	–	0
Camp Kilmer		–		2	–	2	–	0
Camp Lee		–		5	–	5	–	0
Logan Navy		–		2	–	2	–	0
Spokane Air Service		–		2	–	2	–	0
Camp Edwards		–		4	–	5	–	0
Curtis Bay Coast Guard		–		4	–	5	–	0
Saint Mary's Pre-Flight		–		3	–	4	–	1
Jacksonville NATTC		–		3	–	4	–	0
Richmond AAB		–		4	–	6	–	1
Atlantic City NAS		–		2	–	3	–	0
North Carolina Pre-Flight		–		2	–	4	–	1
Patterson Field		–		2	–	4	–	1
Bowman Field		–		2	–	4	–	0
Kirtland Field		–		1	–	2	–	0
Lakehurst NAS		–		2	–	4	–	0
Camp Grant		–		2	–	6	–	2
Lowry Field		–		1	–	3	–	0
Fort Monroe		–		3	–	7	–	0
Daniel Field		–		2	–	7	–	0
Camp Gordon		–		1	–	4	–	0
South Plains AAF		–		1	–	4	–	0
Greenville AAB		–		1	–	5	–	0
Ward Island Marines		–		1	–	5	–	0
Bryan AAF		–		1	–	6	–	0
Pocatello AAB		–		0	–	3	–	0
Norfolk Fleet Marines		–		0	–	9	–	0
Rankings from AP Poll

The 1943 Salt Lake Army Air Base Wings football team represented the United States Army Air Forces's Salt Lake Army Air Base (Salt Lake AAB), located in Salt Lake City, during the 1943 college football season. Led by head coach Don Galbreath, the Wings compiled a record of 4–3–2. Jim Henry and Pat Hogan were assistant coaches for the team. Salt Lake AAB's roster included Bulbs Ehlers and Bob Ingalls.

In the final Litkenhous Ratings, Salt Lake AAB ranked 101st among the nation's college and service teams with a rating of 65.9.

== Schedule ==
Date	Time	Opponent	Site	Result	Attendance	Source
October 3	2:30 p.m.	vs. Fort Douglas	State fairgrounds gridiron; Salt Lake City, UT	T 0–0		
October 8	8:00 p.m.	at Kearns Field	East High School stadium; Salt Lake City, UT	L 0–4	6,500	
October 16		at Colorado	Colorado Stadium; Boulder, CO	L 0–14		
October 24	3:00 p.m.	at Reno AAB	Mackay Field; Reno, NV	T 0–0	2,500	
October 31	2:30 p.m.	Fort Warren	Community Park; Salt Lake City, UT	L 0–10	1,500	
November 7	2:00 p.m.	Bushnell General Hospital	Community Park; Salt Lake City, UT	W 59–0		
November 14	2:00 p.m.	Fort Douglas	Community Park; Salt Lake City, UT	W 25–6	6,500	
November 20	4:30 p.m.	at Oregon Army	Hayward Field; Eugene, OR	W 13–6	3,500	
November 28		Kearns Field	Community Park; Salt Lake City, UT	W 30–0	6,000	
All times are in Mountain time
