= List of Evergreen Conference football standings =

This is a list of yearly Evergreen Conference football standings.

== Evergreen Conference standings ==
1948 Evergreen Conference football standings
	Conf.					Overall
Team	W		L		T	W		L		T
Eastern Washington +	5	–	1	–	0	8	–	1	–	0
Puget Sound +	5	–	1	–	0	6	–	2	–	1
Pacific Lutheran	4	–	2	–	0	6	–	2	–	1
Whitworth	2	–	3	–	1	4	–	4	–	1
Central Washington	2	–	3	–	1	5	–	3	–	1
Western Washington	2	–	4	–	0	5	–	4	–	0
Saint Martin's	0	–	6	–	0	2	–	8	–	0
+ – Conference co-champions

1949 Evergreen Conference football standings
	Conf.					Overall
Team	W		L		T	W		L		T
Puget Sound +	5	–	1	–	0	7	–	1	–	0
Eastern Washington +	5	–	1	–	0	7	–	2	–	0
Western Washington	3	–	2	–	1	4	–	4	–	1
Pacific Lutheran	2	–	3	–	1	2	–	5	–	2
Whitworth	2	–	4	–	0	5	–	4	–	0
Central Washington	2	–	4	–	0	3	–	6	–	0
Saint Martin's	1	–	5	–	0	3	–	6	–	0
+ – Conference co-champions

1950 Evergreen Conference football standings
	Conf.					Overall
Team	W		L		T	W		L		T
Eastern Washington $	5	–	1	–	0	8	–	2	–	0
Western Washington	4	–	1	–	1	7	–	2	–	1
Pacific Lutheran	3	–	2	–	1	4	–	3	–	1
Puget Sound	2	–	2	–	2	3	–	3	–	3
Whitworth	2	–	4	–	0	4	–	3	–	1
Saint Martin's	1	–	4	–	1	2	–	5	–	1
Central Washington	1	–	4	–	1	1	–	7	–	1
$ – Conference champion

1951 Evergreen Conference football standings
	Conf.					Overall
Team	W		L		T	W		L		T
Western Washington +	4	–	1	–	0	8	–	1	–	0
Puget Sound +	4	–	1	–	0	7	–	1	–	0
Pacific Lutheran +	4	–	1	–	0	4	–	3	–	0
Whitworth	1	–	4	–	0	4	–	3	–	1
Eastern Washington	1	–	4	–	0	2	–	6	–	0
Central Washington	1	–	4	–	0	1	–	6	–	0
+ – Conference co-champions

1952 Evergreen Conference football standings
	Conf.					Overall
Team	W		L		T	W		L		T
Pacific Lutheran $	5	–	0	–	1	5	–	2	–	1
Western Washington	4	–	1	–	1	5	–	2	–	1
Puget Sound	4	–	2	–	0	5	–	3	–	1
Whitworth	4	–	2	–	0	4	–	3	–	1
Central Washington	2	–	4	–	0	4	–	4	–	0
Eastern Washington	1	–	5	–	0	1	–	7	–	0
UBC	0	–	6	–	0	0	–	8	–	0
$ – Conference champion

1953 Evergreen Conference football standings
	Conf.					Overall
Team	W		L		T	W		L		T
Puget Sound +	5	–	1	–	0	7	–	1	–	0
Whitworth +	5	–	1	–	0	7	–	1	–	0
Eastern Washington	4	–	2	–	0	6	–	2	–	0
Pacific Lutheran	3	–	3	–	0	3	–	6	–	0
Western Washington	2	–	4	–	0	3	–	4	–	2
Central Washington	2	–	4	–	0	2	–	6	–	0
UBC	0	–	6	–	0	?	–	?	–	?
+ – Conference co-champions

1954 Evergreen Conference football standings
	Conf.					Overall
Team	W		L		T	W		L		T
Whitworth $	6	–	0	–	0	8	–	0	–	0
Puget Sound	5	–	1	–	0	6	–	2	–	0
Pacific Lutheran	4	–	2	–	0	5	–	3	–	0
Western Washington	3	–	3	–	0	3	–	5	–	0
Central Washington	2	–	4	–	0	2	–	6	–	0
Eastern Washington	1	–	5	–	0	1	–	8	–	0
UBC	0	–	6	–	0	?	–	?	–	?
$ – Conference champion

1955 Evergreen Conference football standings
	Conf.					Overall
Team	W		L		T	W		L		T
Whitworth $	6	–	0	–	0	9	–	0	–	0
Pacific Lutheran	5	–	1	–	0	5	–	3	–	0
Puget Sound	4	–	2	–	0	6	–	2	–	0
Eastern Washington	3	–	3	–	0	4	–	4	–	0
Central Washington	2	–	4	–	0	2	–	6	–	0
UBC	1	–	5	–	0	?	–	?	–	?
Western Washington	0	–	6	–	0	1	–	7	–	0
$ – Conference champion

1956 Evergreen Conference football standings
	Conf.					Overall
Team	W		L		T	W		L		T
Puget Sound $	6	–	0	–	0	8	–	0	–	1
Eastern Washington	3	–	2	–	1	5	–	2	–	1
Whitworth	3	–	3	–	0	5	–	4	–	0
Pacific Lutheran	3	–	3	–	0	3	–	3	–	1
Central Washington	2	–	3	–	1	3	–	4	–	1
Western Washington	2	–	4	–	0	2	–	6	–	0
UBC	1	–	5	–	0	?	–	?	–	?
$ – Conference champion

1957 Evergreen Conference football standings
	Conf.					Overall
Team	W		L		T	W		L		T
Central Washington $	6	–	0	–	0	7	–	1	–	0
Puget Sound	4	–	1	–	1	4	–	3	–	1
Western Washington	4	–	2	–	0	4	–	3	–	0
Eastern Washington	3	–	2	–	1	5	–	2	–	1
Whitworth	2	–	4	–	0	2	–	6	–	0
Pacific Lutheran	1	–	5	–	0	2	–	6	–	0
UBC	0	–	6	–	0	?	–	?	–	?
$ – Conference champion

1958 Evergreen Conference football standings
	Conf.					Overall
Team	W		L		T	W		L		T
Central Washington +	4	–	1	–	0	6	–	1	–	1
Western Washington +	4	–	1	–	0	6	–	2	–	0
Puget Sound	3	–	2	–	0	4	–	5	–	0
Eastern Washington	2	–	3	–	0	4	–	4	–	0
Whitworth	1	–	4	–	0	3	–	7	–	0
Pacific Lutheran	1	–	4	–	0	1	–	7	–	0
+ – Conference co-champions

1959 Evergreen Conference football standings
	Conf.					Overall
Team	W		L		T	W		L		T
No. 19 Whitworth $	4	–	1	–	0	9	–	1	–	0
Puget Sound	3	–	1	–	1	6	–	1	–	1
Central Washington	3	–	2	–	0	3	–	6	–	0
Western Washington	2	–	3	–	0	3	–	5	–	0
Eastern Washington	1	–	3	–	1	2	–	6	–	1
Pacific Lutheran	1	–	3	–	1	1	–	6	–	1
$ – Conference champion; Rankings from NAIA poll

1960 Evergreen Conference football standings
	Conf.					Overall
Team	W		L		T	W		L		T
No. 4 Whitworth $^	7	–	0	–	0	9	–	1	–	0
Central Washington	4	–	3	–	0	4	–	4	–	0
Puget Sound	4	–	3	–	0	4	–	4	–	1
Pacific Lutheran	2	–	5	–	0	3	–	6	–	0
Western Washington	2	–	5	–	0	2	–	7	–	0
Eastern Washington	2	–	5	–	0	2	–	7	–	0
$ – Conference champion; ^ – NAIA playoff participant; Rankings from NAIA poll

1961 Evergreen Conference football standings
	Conf.					Overall
Team	W		L		T	W		L		T
Central Washington $	6	–	1	–	0	7	–	2	–	0
Whitworth *	6	–	1	–	0	?	–	?	–	?
Western Washington	4	–	3	–	0	5	–	4	–	0
Puget Sound	3	–	3	–	1	5	–	3	–	1
Pacific Lutheran	1	–	5	–	1	2	–	6	–	1
Eastern Washington	0	–	7	–	0	0	–	9	–	0
$ – Conference champion; * – on probation; ineligible for conference title

1962 Evergreen Conference football standings
	Conf.					Overall
Team	W		L		T	W		L		T
Whitworth $	6	–	1	–	0	6	–	3	–	0
Puget Sound	5	–	1	–	1	6	–	2	–	1
Central Washington	3	–	3	–	1	4	–	4	–	1
Western Washington	3	–	3	–	1	4	–	4	–	1
Pacific Lutheran	1	–	4	–	2	2	–	5	–	2
Eastern Washington	0	–	6	–	1	0	–	8	–	1
$ – Conference champion

1963 Evergreen Conference football standings
	Conf.					Overall
Team	W		L		T	W		L		T
No. 10 Central Washington $	7	–	0	–	0	9	–	0	–	0
Whitworth	5	–	2	–	0	6	–	2	–	1
Western Washington	4	–	3	–	0	5	–	4	–	0
Puget Sound	2	–	5	–	0	4	–	5	–	0
Eastern Washington	2	–	5	–	0	3	–	6	–	0
Pacific Lutheran	1	–	6	–	0	1	–	7	–	0
$ – Conference champion; Rankings from NAIA poll

1964 Evergreen Conference football standings
	Conf.					Overall
Team	W		L		T	W		L		T
Pacific Lutheran $	5	–	2	–	0	6	–	3	–	0
Whitworth	4	–	3	–	0	6	–	3	–	0
Central Washington	4	–	3	–	0	5	–	3	–	1
Western Washington	4	–	3	–	0	5	–	3	–	1
Eastern Washington	4	–	3	–	0	5	–	4	–	0
Puget Sound	0	–	7	–	0	1	–	8	–	0
$ – Conference champion

1965 Evergreen Conference football standings
	Conf.					Overall
Team	W		L		T	W		L		T
No. 10 Eastern Washington $	4	–	1	–	0	8	–	1	–	0
Whitworth	3	–	2	–	0	5	–	3	–	0
Western Washington	2	–	2	–	1	4	–	4	–	1
Central Washington	1	–	3	–	1	3	–	4	–	1
Puget Sound	0	–	2	–	2	0	–	5	–	3
$ – Conference champion; Rankings from NAIA poll

1966 Evergreen Conference football standings
	Conf.					Overall
Team	W		L		T	W		L		T
No. 19 Eastern Washington $	4	–	1	–	1	7	–	1	–	1
Puget Sound	3	–	3	–	0	5	–	4	–	0
Central Washington	2	–	2	–	2	2	–	5	–	2
Western Washington	2	–	3	–	1	3	–	4	–	2
Whitworth	2	–	4	–	0	2	–	8	–	0
$ – Conference champion; Rankings from NAIA poll

1967 Evergreen Conference football standings
	Conf.					Overall
Team	W		L		T	W		L		T
No. 2 Eastern Washington $^	6	–	0	–	0	11	–	1	–	0
Central Washington	3	–	3	–	0	4	–	6	–	0
Western Washington	2	–	4	–	0	3	–	6	–	0
Whitworth	1	–	5	–	0	2	–	7	–	0
$ – Conference champion; ^ – NAIA playoff participant; Rankings from NAIA poll

1968 Evergreen Conference football standings
	Conf.					Overall
Team	W		L		T	W		L		T
Central Washington $	6	–	0	–	0	6	–	3	–	0
Eastern Washington	3	–	3	–	0	3	–	7	–	0
Western Washington	2	–	4	–	0	3	–	6	–	0
Whitworth	1	–	5	–	0	1	–	9	–	0
$ – Conference champion

1969 Evergreen Conference football standings
	Conf.					Overall
Team	W		L		T	W		L		T
Western Washington +	4	–	2	–	0	5	–	4	–	0
Eastern Washington +	4	–	2	–	0	4	–	5	–	0
Central Washington	3	–	3	–	0	3	–	6	–	0
Whitworth	1	–	5	–	0	1	–	8	–	0
+ – Conference co-champions

1970 Evergreen Conference football standings
	Conf.					Overall
Team	W		L		T	W		L		T
Central Washington $	5	–	0	–	0	7	–	3	–	0
Western Washington	5	–	1	–	0	5	–	5	–	0
Oregon College	4	–	2	–	0	5	–	5	–	0
Eastern Washington	3	–	4	–	0	4	–	6	–	0
Eastern Oregon	2	–	3	–	0	5	–	4	–	0
Whitworth	2	–	3	–	0	2	–	7	–	0
Southern Oregon	1	–	5	–	0	1	–	9	–	0
Oregon Tech	0	–	4	–	0	0	–	9	–	0
$ – Conference champion

1971 Evergreen Conference football standings
	Conf.					Overall
Team	W		L		T	W		L		T
Western Washington $	6	–	0	–	0	7	–	3	–	0
Oregon College	4	–	2	–	0	8	–	2	–	0
Eastern Washington	3	–	2	–	0	5	–	5	–	0
Eastern Oregon	3	–	3	–	0	4	–	6	–	0
Central Washington	2	–	3	–	0	4	–	6	–	0
Southern Oregon	1	–	4	–	0	2	–	8	–	0
Oregon Tech	0	–	5	–	0	1	–	8	–	0
$ – Conference champion

1972 Evergreen Conference football standings
	Conf.					Overall
Team	W		L		T	W		L		T
No. 8 Central Washington $	6	–	0	–	0	9	–	1	–	0
Oregon College	5	–	1	–	0	6	–	4	–	0
Southern Oregon	3	–	3	–	0	4	–	5	–	0
Eastern Washington	2	–	4	–	0	3	–	7	–	0
Eastern Oregon	2	–	4	–	0	3	–	6	–	0
Western Washington	2	–	4	–	0	2	–	7	–	0
Oregon Tech	1	–	5	–	0	1	–	9	–	0
$ – Conference champion; Rankings from NAIA Division I poll

1973 Evergreen Conference football standings
	Conf.					Overall
Team	W		L		T	W		L		T
No. 16 Central Washington $	5	–	1	–	0	7	–	2	–	0
Eastern Oregon	4	–	2	–	0	7	–	2	–	0
Oregon College	4	–	2	–	0	6	–	3	–	0
Southern Oregon	4	–	2	–	0	6	–	3	–	0
Eastern Washington	2	–	4	–	0	5	–	4	–	0
Western Washington	1	–	5	–	0	1	–	7	–	0
Oregon Tech	1	–	5	–	0	1	–	8	–	0
$ – Conference champion; Rankings from NAIA Division I poll

1974 Evergreen Conference football standings
	Conf.					Overall
Team	W		L		T	W		L		T
Eastern Washington $	4	–	2	–	0	4	–	5	–	0
Oregon College	3	–	2	–	1	3	–	4	–	1
Central Washington	3	–	2	–	1	3	–	5	–	1
Eastern Oregon	3	–	3	–	0	5	–	4	–	0
Southern Oregon	3	–	3	–	0	5	–	4	–	0
Oregon Tech	2	–	2	–	2	3	–	3	–	2
Western Washington	1	–	5	–	0	1	–	7	–	1
$ – Conference champion

1975 Evergreen Conference football standings
	Conf.					Overall
Team	W		L		T	W		L		T
No. 5 Oregon College $^	6	–	0	–	0	9	–	1	–	0
Central Washington	4	–	2	–	0	5	–	4	–	0
Southern Oregon	3	–	3	–	0	6	–	4	–	0
Western Washington	3	–	3	–	0	3	–	5	–	0
Eastern Oregon	2	–	4	–	0	5	–	4	–	0
Eastern Washington	2	–	3	–	0	3	–	6	–	0
Oregon Tech	1	–	5	–	0	3	–	5	–	0
$ – Conference champion; ^ – NAIA Division I playoff participant; Rankings from NAIA Division I poll

1976 Evergreen Conference football standings
	Conf.					Overall
Team	W		L		T	W		L		T
No. 9 Oregon College $	6	–	0	–	0	9	–	1	–	0
Western Washington	4	–	2	–	0	6	–	3	–	0
Eastern Washington	3	–	2	–	1	4	–	4	–	1
Central Washington	3	–	3	–	0	3	–	6	–	0
Southern Oregon	2	–	4	–	0	3	–	6	–	0
Eastern Oregon	1	–	4	–	1	1	–	7	–	1
Oregon Tech	1	–	5	–	0	2	–	7	–	0
$ – Conference champion; Rankings from NAIA Division I poll

1977 Evergreen Conference football standings
	Conf.					Overall
Team	W		L		T	W		L		T
No. 17 Oregon College $	6	–	0	–	0	7	–	2	–	0
Western Washington	5	–	1	–	0	6	–	4	–	0
Eastern Washington	3	–	3	–	0	5	–	4	–	0
Central Washington	3	–	3	–	0	3	–	6	–	0
Southern Oregon	2	–	4	–	0	3	–	6	–	0
Eastern Oregon	1	–	5	–	0	2	–	7	–	0
Oregon Tech	1	–	5	–	0	2	–	7	–	0
$ – Conference champion; Rankings from NAIA Division I poll

1978 Evergreen Conference football standings
	Conf.					Overall
Team	W		L		T	W		L		T
No. 8 Oregon College $^	5	–	1	–	0	8	–	2	–	0
Eastern Washington	4	–	2	–	0	6	–	4	–	0
Oregon Tech	3	–	3	–	0	5	–	4	–	0
Eastern Oregon	3	–	3	–	0	5	–	5	–	0
Southern Oregon	3	–	3	–	0	4	–	5	–	0
Western Washington	3	–	3	–	0	4	–	6	–	0
Central Washington	0	–	6	–	0	0	–	9	–	0
$ – Conference champion; ^ – NAIA Division I playoff participant Central Washington forfeited victories over Eastern Oregon, Oregon Tech, and Southern Oregon because of an inelgible player.; Rankings from NAIA Division I poll

1979 Evergreen Conference football standings
	Conf.					Overall
Team	W		L		T	W		L		T
No. 13 Oregon College $	5	–	0	–	0	8	–	1	–	1
No. T–15 Oregon Tech	3	–	2	–	0	7	–	2	–	0
Eastern Oregon	3	–	2	–	0	6	–	3	–	0
Western Washington	2	–	3	–	0	4	–	5	–	0
Southern Oregon	1	–	4	–	0	2	–	7	–	0
Central Washington	1	–	4	–	0	1	–	8	–	1
$ – Conference champion; Rankings from NAIA Division I poll

1980 Evergreen Conference football standings
	Conf.					Overall
Team	W		L		T	W		L		T
No. 12 Eastern Oregon +	4	–	1	–	0	8	–	1	–	0
Oregon Tech +	4	–	1	–	0	7	–	2	–	0
Oregon College +	4	–	1	–	0	6	–	3	–	0
Southern Oregon	2	–	3	–	0	3	–	7	–	0
Central Washington	1	–	4	–	0	2	–	7	–	0
Western Washington	0	–	5	–	0	2	–	7	–	0
+ – Conference co-champions; Rankings from NAIA Division I poll

1981 Evergreen Conference football standings
	Conf.					Overall
Team	W		L		T	W		L		T
No. 15 Oregon Tech $	4	–	0	–	0	7	–	2	–	0
Eastern Oregon	3	–	1	–	0	5	–	4	–	0
Central Washington	2	–	2	–	0	6	–	3	–	0
Western Oregon	1	–	3	–	0	5	–	4	–	0
Western Washington	0	–	4	–	0	0	–	9	–	0
Southern Oregon *			–			6	–	4	–	0
$ – Conference champion; * – Southern Oregon was ineligible for the conference titlepoll=NAIA Division I poll; Rankings from AP Poll

1982 Evergreen Conference football standings
	Conf.					Overall
Team	W		L		T	W		L		T
No. 12 Central Washington +	4	–	1	–	0	8	–	2	–	0
No. 14 Oregon Tech +	4	–	1	–	0	7	–	2	–	0
Southern Oregon	3	–	1	–	0	6	–	4	–	0
Eastern Oregon	2	–	2	–	0	5	–	4	–	0
Western Oregon	1	–	4	–	0	3	–	6	–	0
Western Washington	0	–	5	–	0	1	–	8	–	0
+ – Conference co-champions; Rankings from NAIA Division I poll

1983 Evergreen Conference football standings
	Conf.					Overall
Team	W		L		T	W		L		T
Puget Sound $	6	–	1	–	0	6	–	4	–	0
Southern Oregon	5	–	2	–	0	9	–	2	–	0
No. 14 Central Washington	5	–	2	–	0	8	–	2	–	0
Simon Fraser	4	–	3	–	0	4	–	6	–	0
Eastern Oregon	3	–	4	–	0	5	–	5	–	0
Oregon Tech	2	–	5	–	0	4	–	6	–	0
Western Oregon	2	–	5	–	0	3	–	7	–	0
Western Washington	1	–	6	–	0	1	–	9	–	0
$ – Conference champion; Rankings from NAIA Division I poll

1984 Evergreen Conference football standings
	Conf.					Overall
Team	W		L		T	W		L		T
No. 2 Central Washington $^	8	–	0	–	0	11	–	2	–	0
No. 19 Simon Fraser	5	–	2	–	0	7	–	3	–	0
Southern Oregon	4	–	3	–	0	6	–	4	–	0
Puget Sound	4	–	3	–	1	5	–	4	–	1
Oregon Tech	3	–	4	–	0	3	–	4	–	2
Whitworth	3	–	4	–	0	4	–	5	–	0
Western Oregon	3	–	4	–	0	3	–	5	–	2
Western Washington	2	–	5	–	1	2	–	7	–	1
Eastern Oregon	0	–	8	–	0	0	–	10	–	0
$ – Conference champion; ^ – NAIA Division I playoff participant; Rankings from NAIA Division I poll
