= 1940 Pacific Lutheran Lutes football team =

American college football season

1940 Pacific Lutheran Lutes football
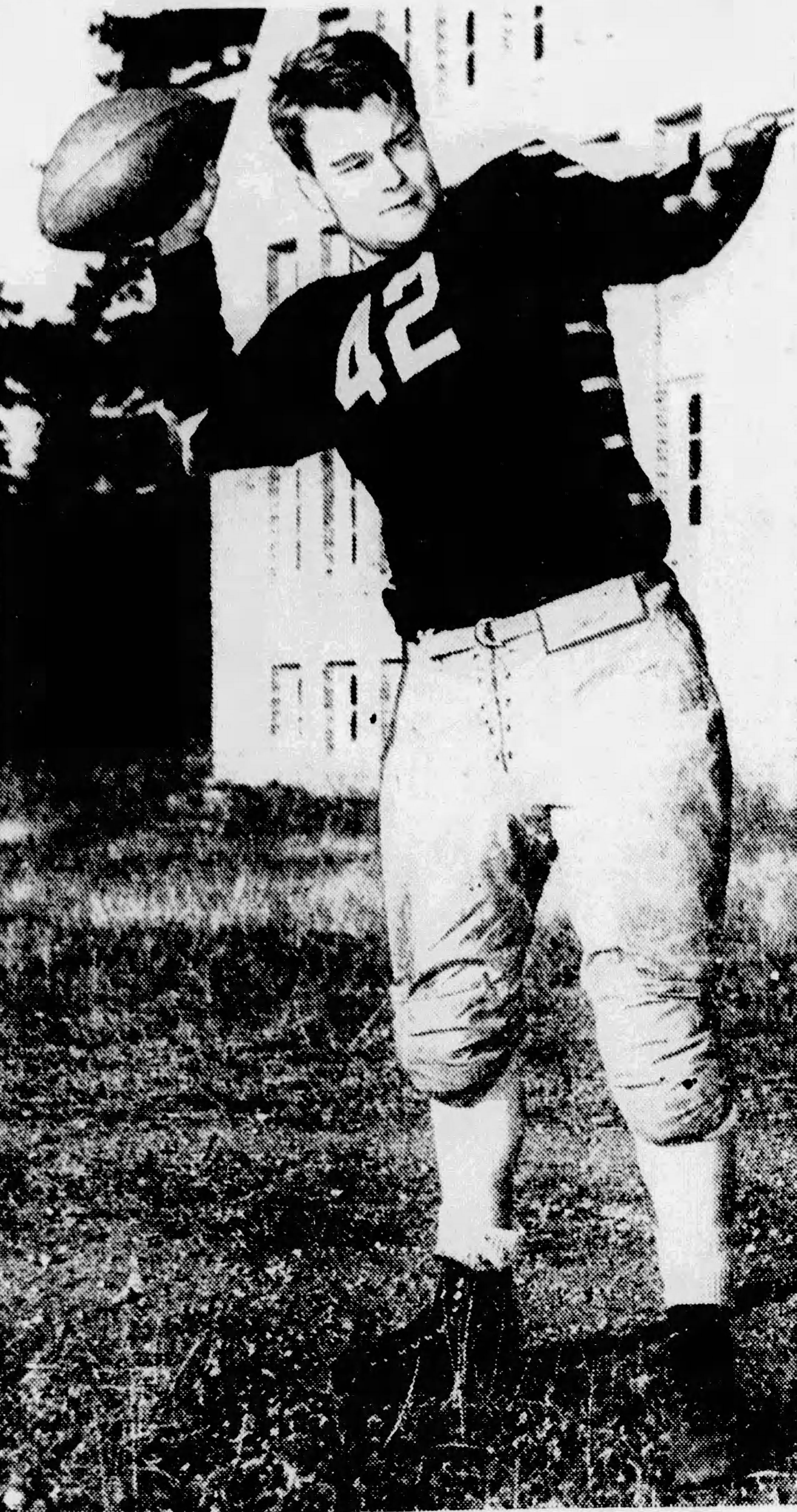
- Halfback Marv Tommervik, 1940

WINCO champion
- Conference: Washington Intercollegiate Conference
- Record: 8–0 (4–0 WINCO)
- Head coach: Cliff Olson (8th season)
- Home stadium: Tacoma Stadium

1940 Washington Intercollegiate Conference football standings
| | Conf. | | | | | Overall |
| Team | W | | L | | T | W | | L | | T |
|---|---|---|---|---|---|---|---|---|---|---|
| Pacific Lutheran $ | 4 | – | 0 | – | 0 | 8 | – | 0 | – | 0 |
| Eastern Washington | 3 | – | 1 | – | 0 | 6 | – | 2 | – | 0 |
| Central Washington | 2 | – | 2 | – | 0 | 4 | – | 3 | – | 0 |
| Western Washington | 1 | – | 3 | – | 0 | 3 | – | 4 | – | 0 |
| Saint Martin's | 0 | – | 4 | – | 0 | 1 | – | 6 | – | 0 |
$ – Conference champion

The 1940 Pacific Lutheran Lutes football team, also known as the Gladiators, was an American football team that represented Pacific Lutheran University as a member of the Washington Intercollegiate Conference (WINCO) during the 1940 college football season. In their eighth season under head coach Cliff Olson, the Lutes compiled an 8–0 record (4–0 in conference games), won the WINCO championship, and outscored opponents by a total of 207 to 53.

The regular season ended on November 16, but the team agreed to a post-season game against a Gonzaga team featuring halfback Tony Canadeo who was later inducted into the Pro Football Hall of Fame. Pacific Lutheran defeated Gonzaga, 16–13, kicking a game-winning field goal in the final 16 seconds of the game.

The team gained Fame for its "wide open passing game", sometimes referred to as an "air circus" which included both tossing the ball laterally as well as forward. The key players in the passing game were halfback Marv "Tommygun" Tommervik who completed 75 of 145 passes for 1,292 yards; fullback Marv Harshman who led all players in the far west with 72 points scored; end Earl Platt who tallied 36 pass receptions for 735 yards; and end Sig Sigurdson who later played for the Baltimore Colts.

Pacific Lutheran in 1940 had an enrollment of 454 students. The team played its home games at Tacoma Stadium in Tacoma, Washington.

== Schedule ==
| Date | Opponent | Site | Result | Attendance | Source |
|---|---|---|---|---|---|
| September 23 | Saint Martin's | Tacoma Stadium; Tacoma, WA | W 33–0 | | |
| September 27 | at Pacific (OR)* | Tacoma Stadium; Tacoma, WA | W 26–6 | | |
| October 5 | at Linfield* | McMinnville, OR | W 45–6 | | |
| October 19 | at Western Washington | Parkland, WA | W 26–7 | | |
| November 2 | at Eastern Washington | Woodward Field; Cheney, WA | W 20–14 | 3,500 | |
| November 8 | at Saint Martin's* | Stevens Field; Olympia, WA | W 27–7 | | |
| November 16 | Central Washington^{†} | Tacoma Stadium; Tacoma, WA | W 14–0 | 7,000 | |
| November 29 | Gonzaga* | Tacoma Stadium; Tacoma, WA | W 16–13 | 12,000–15,000 | |
*Non-conference game; ^{†}Homecoming
