= 1961 Evergreen Conference football season =

- Sport: Football
- Number of teams: 6
- Champion: Central Washington

Football seasons
- ← 1960 1962 →

1961 Evergreen Conference football standings
	Conf.					Overall
Team	W		L		T	W		L		T
Central Washington $	6	–	1	–	0	7	–	2	–	0
Whitworth *	6	–	1	–	0	?	–	?	–	?
Western Washington	4	–	3	–	0	5	–	4	–	0
Puget Sound	3	–	3	–	1	5	–	3	–	1
Pacific Lutheran	1	–	5	–	1	2	–	6	–	1
Eastern Washington	0	–	7	–	0	0	–	9	–	0
$ – Conference champion; * – on probation; ineligible for conference title

The 1961 Evergreen Conference football season was the season of college football played by the six member schools of the Evergreen Conference (EC) as part of the 1961 college football season.

The 1961 Central Washington Wildcats football team, led by head coach Adrian L. Beamer, compiled a 7–2 record (6–1 in conference games) and won the Evergreen Conference championship. Junior Phil Fitterer won all-conference honors at both quarterback and safety.

The 1961 Whitworth Pirates football team, led by head coach Sam Adams, compiled a 9-1 record (7-1 in conference games) but were ineligible for the championship, having been placed on probation because the track team had allowed an ineligible student to compete in preseason track meets. Whitworth end John Murio led all small college players in scoring (129 points scored) and receiving yards (811). Quarterback Dennis Spurlock led the country (both major and small colleges) with 1,760 yards of total offense and also ranked second nationally with 1,708 passing yards.

Western Washington and Central Washington dominated the 1961 Evergreen all-conference team, taking with ten and eight spots, respectively.

== Conference overview ==
Conf. rank	Team	Head coach	Conf. record	Overall record	Points scored	Points against
1	Central Washington	Adrian L. Beamer	7-2	6-1	223	106
2	Whitworth	Sam Adams	9-1	6-1	392	59
3	Western Washington	Jim Lounsberry	5-4	4-3	93	126
4	Puget Sound	John P. Heinrick	5-3-1	3-3-1	115	127
5	Pacific Lutheran	Jim Gabrielson	2-5-1	1-5-1	73	244
6	Eastern Washington	Ed Chissus	0-9	0-7	20	227

== Teams ==
=== Central Washington ===
1961 Central Washington Wildcats football

Evergreen champion
- Conference: Evergreen Conference
- Record: 7–2 (6–1 Evergreen)
- Head coach: Adrian L. Beamer (1st season)

The 1961 Central Washington Wildcats football team represented Central Washington College of Education (now known as Central Washington University) of Ellensburg, Washington. In their first year under head coach Adrian L. Beamer, the team compiled a 7–2 record (6–1 against EC opponents) and won the conference championship.

Central Washington players took seven places on the 1961 Evergreen all-conference team: Phil Fitterer (quarterback on offense, safety on defense); Harvey Rath (halfback on offense); Dick Kinart (guard on offense, tackle on defense); Bill Betcher (center on offense, linebacker on defense)

Date	Opponent	Site	Result	Attendance	Source
September 23	Whitman*	Ellensburg, WA	W 19–0		
September 30	Whitworth	Ellensburg, WA	W 33–14		
October 7	Eastern Washington	Ellensburg, WA	W 35–0		
October 14	at Pacific Lutheran	Tacoma, WA	W 25–7		
October 21	at Western Washington	Bellingham, WA	W 19–13		
October 28	Puget Sound	Ellensburg, WA	W 33–21		
November 4	Whitworth		L 19–21	5,000	
November 11	at Eastern Washington	Cheney, WA	W 26–6		
November 18	at No. 17 Humboldt State*	Redwood Bowl; Arcata, CA	L 14–34	5,000	
*Non-conference game; Rankings from AP/UPI Poll released prior to the game

=== Whitworth ===
1961 Whitworth Pirates football
- Conference: Evergreen Conference
- Record: 9–1 (6–1 Evergreen)
- Head coach: Sam Adams (4th season)

The 1961 Whitworth Pirates football team represented Whitworth College (now known as Whitworth University) of Spokane, Washington. In their fourth year under head coach Sam Adams, the team compiled a 9–1 record (6–1 against EC opponents), shut out seven of ten opponents, and outscored all opponents by a total of 281 to 59.

Two Whitworth players ranked first nationally among small college players in various statistical categories:

- End John Murio led all small college players in scoring with 129 points (15 touchdowns, 33 extra points, 2 field goals); he was the first end to win the national scoring championship. Murio also led small college players with 811 receiving yards and 13 receiving touchdowns.
- Quarterback Dennis Spurlock led the country (both major and small colleges) with 1,760 yards of total offense. He also ranked second nationally with 1,708 passing yards.

Murio was a second-team selection and Spurlock a third-team pick on the 1961 Little All-America college football team.

The Pirates were ineligible for the conference championship, because the team had been placed on probation by the Evergreen Conference. Coach Sam Adams, who was also the school's track coach, had allowed an ineligible student to participate in three preseason track meets. The conference therefore ruled that, if Adams remained the coach, Whitworth's track and football teams would be ineligible to compete for the conference championship during the 1961-62 academic year.

Date	Opponent	Site	Result	Attendance	Source
September 23	Oregon Tech	Spokane, WA	W 47–0		
September 30	at Central Washington	Ellensburg, WA	L 14–33		
October 7	Pacific Lutheran	Memorial Stadium; Spokane, WA	W 67–0	2,000	
October 14	at Puget Sound	Tacoma, WA	W 29–7	3,500	
October 21	at Eastern Washington	Cheney, WA	W 52–0	2,500	
October 28	Western Washington^{†}	Spokane, WA	W 53–0	5,000	
November 4	Central Washington		W 21–19	5,000	
November 11	at Pacific Lutheran	Lincoln Bowl; Tacoma, WA	W 45–0		
November 18	Western Montana	Spokane, WA	W 54–0		
November 23	Humboldt State	Redwood Bowl; Arcata, CA	W 10–0	3,500	
^{†}Homecoming

=== Western Washington ===
1961 Western Washington Vikings football
- Conference: Evergreen Conference
- Record: 5–4 (4–3 Evergreen)
- Head coach: Jim Lounsberry (2nd season)
- Home stadium: Battersby Field

The 1961 Western Washington Vikings football team represented Western Washington State College (now known as Western Washington University) of Bellingham, Washington. In their second year under head coach Jim Lounsberry, the team compiled a 5–4 record (4–3 against EC opponents), was outscored by a total of 126 to 93, and finished in third place in the Evergreen conference.

Western Washington took 10 spots on the 1961 All-Evergreen Conference football team: Ron Ladines (fullback on offense and linebacker on defense); Harvey Rath (halfback on offense); Gary Moore (end on offense and defense); Harry Leons (tackle on offense); Matt Kjelstad (guard on defense); Gary Fumano (linebacker); Ken Fry (linebacker); and Doug Ringebach (safety on defense).

Date	Opponent	Site	Result	Attendance	Source
September 23	British Columbia*	Battersby Field; Bellingham, WA (Shrine Bowl)	W 13–6		
September 30	Pacific Lutheran	Battersby Field; Bellingham, WA	W 13–7		
October 7	at Puget Sound	Tacoma, WA	W 13–0		
October 14	Eastern Washington	Cheney, WA	W 7–0		
October 21	Central Washington	Battersby Field; Belingham, WA	L 13–19		
October 28	at Whitworth	Spokane, WA	L 0–53	5,000	
November 4	at Pacific Lutheran	Tacoma, WA	W 21–14		
November 11	Puget Sound^{†}	Battersby Field; Bellingham, WA	L 6–14	4,000	
November 18	at Portland State*	Portland, OR	L 7–13		
*Non-conference game; ^{†}Homecoming

=== Puget Sound ===
1961 Puget Sound Loggers football
- Conference: Evergreen Conference
- Record: 5–3–1 (3–3–1 Evergreen)
- Head coach: John P. Heinrick (14th season)

The 1961 Puget Sound Loggers football team represented the University of Puget Sound of Tacoma, Washington. In their 14th year under head coach John P. Heinrick, the team compiled a 5–3–1 record (3–3–1 against EC opponents), was outscored by a total of 127 to 115, and finished in fourth place in the Evergreen conference.

Puget Sound players took four spots on the 1961 All-Evergreen football team: Ralph Ferguson at tackle on offense and guard on defense; Gary Daso at halfback on offense; and Cal Christoph at end on defense.

Date	Opponent	Site	Result	Attendance	Source
September 23	Willamette*	Tacoma, WA	W 20–19		
September 30	Eastern Washington		W 7–0		
October 7	Western Washington	Tacoma, WA	L 0–13		
October 14	Whitworth	Tacoma, WA	L 7–29	3,500	
October 21	Pacific Lutheran		T 13–13		
October 28	at Central Washington	Ellensburg, WA	L 21–33		
November 4	Eastern Washington		W 12–7		
November 11	Western Washington	Battersby Field; Bellingham, WA	W 14–6	4,000	
November 18	Pacific Lutheran	Lincoln Bowl; Tacoma, WA	W 21–7		
*Non-conference game

=== Pacific Lutheran ===
1961 Pacific Lutheran Lutes football
- Conference: Evergreen Conference
- Record: 2–5–1 (1–5–1 Evergreen)
- Head coach: Jim Gabrielson (4th season)
- Home stadium: Lincoln Bowl

The 1961 Pacific Lutheran Lutes football team represented the Pacific Lutheran University of Parkland, Washington. In their fourth year under head coach Jim Gabrielson, the team compiled a 2–5–1 record (1–5–1 against EC opponents), was outscored by a total of 244 to 73, and finished in fifth place in the Evergreen conference.

Pacific Lutheran took two spots on the 1961 All-Evergreen Conference football team: Dave Bottemiller at offensive end and Norm Juggert at offensive guard.

Date	Opponent	Site	Result	Attendance	Source
September 23	at Pacific (OR)*	Forest Grove, OR	W 12–9		
September 30	at Western Washington	Battersby Field; Bellingham, WA	L 7–13		
October 7	Whitworth	Memorial Stadium; Spokane, WA	L 0–67	2,000	
October 14	Central Washington	Tacoma, WA	L 7–25		
October 21	Puget Sound		T 13–13		
October 28	Eastern Washington		W 13–0		
November 4	Western Washington		L 14–21		
November 11	Whitworth	Lincoln Bowl; Tacoma, WA	L 0–45		
November 18	Puget Sound	Lincoln Bowl; Tacoma, WA	L 7–21		
*Non-conference game

=== Eastern Washington ===
1961 Eastern Washington Savages football
- Conference: Evergreen Conference
- Record: 0–9 (0–7 Evergreen)
- Head coach: Ed Chissus (2nd season)
- Home stadium: Woodward Field

The 1961 Eastern Washington Savages football team represented Eastern Washington State College (now known as Eastern Washington University) of Cheney, Washington. In their second year under head coach Ed Chissus, the team compiled a 0–9 record (0–7 against EC opponents), was outscored by a total of 227 to 20, and finished in last place in the Evergreen conference.

Eastern Washington took two spots on the 1961 All-Evergreen Conference football team: Paul Lerch at defensive end and Harley Allen at defensive tackle.

Date	Opponent	Site	Result	Attendance	Source
September 23	at Humboldt State	Redwood Bowl; Arcata, CA	L 0–53	5,500	
September 30	Puget Sound	Woodward Field; Cheney, WA	L 0–7		
October 7	Central Washington	Ellensburg, WA	L 0–35		
October 14	Western Washington	Woodward Field; Cheney, WA	L 0–7		
October 21	Whitworth	Woodward Field; Cheney, WA	L 0–52	2,500	
October 28	Pacific Lutheran	Woodward Field; Cheney, WA	L 0–13		
November 4	at Puget Sound	Tacoma, WA	L 7–12		
November 11	Central Washington	Woodward, WA; Cheney, WA	L 6–26		
November 18	College of Idaho*	Woodward Field; Cheney, WA	L 7–22		
*Non-conference game

== All-conference selections ==
At the end of the season, the conference coaches voted on an all-conference team. Whitworth players were not considered because the school was on probation. The all-conference selections were as follows:

Offense

- Quarterback - Phil Fitterer, Central Washington, junior
- Fullback - Ron Ladines, Western Washington, senior
- Halfback - Harvey Rath, Central Washington, junior; Ken Fry, Western Washington, junior; Gary Dasso, Puget Sound, junior
- Ends - Dave Bottemiller, Pacific Luthern, senior; Gary Moore, Western Washington, junior
- Tackles - Harry Leons, Western Washington, senior; Ralph Ferguson, Puget Sound, senior
- Guards - Norm Juggert, Pacific Lutheran, junior; Dick Kinart, Central Washington, junior
- Center - Bill Betcher, Central Washington, senior

Defense

- Ends - Cal Christoph, Puget Sound, junior; Gary Moore, Western Washington, junior (tie); Paul Lerch, Eastern Washington, senior (tie)
- Tackles - Harley Allen, Eastern, senior; Dick Kinart, Central Washington, junior
- Guard - Ralph Ferguson, Puget Sound, senior; Matt Kjelstad, Western Washington, junior
- Linebackers - Gary Fumano, Western Washington, junior; Bill Betcher, Central Washington, senior; Ron Ladines, Western Washington, senior; Ken Fry, Western Washington, senior
- Safety - Phil Fitterer, Central Washington, junior (tie); Doug Ringebach, Western Washington (tie)
