= 1938 Western Washington Vikings football team =

American college football season

1938 Western Washington Vikings football

WINCO champion
- Conference: Washington Intercollegiate Conference
- Record: 7–0 (3–0 WINCO)
- Head coach: Charles Lappenbusch (7th season)
- Captain: Fritz Chorvat
- Home stadium: Battersby Field

1938 Washington Intercollegiate Conference football standings
	Conf.					Overall
Team	W		L		T	W		L		T
Western Washington $	3	–	0	–	0	7	–	0	–	0
Eastern Washington	2	–	1	–	0	6	–	2	–	1
Central Washington	1	–	2	–	0	3	–	3	–	1
Pacific Lutheran	0	–	3	–	0	2	–	5	–	1
$ – Conference champion

The 1938 Western Washington Vikings football team was an American football team that represented Western Washington State College (later renamed Western Washington University) of Bellingham, Washington, as a member of the Washington Intercollegiate Conference (WINCO) during the 1938 college football season. In their seventh year under head coach Charles Lappenbusch, the Vikings compiled a perfect 7–0 record and outscored opponents by a total of 98 to 30.

The 1938 team was the first to win a conference championship in Western Washington football history. It also remains the only team in Western Washington's 100-plus history to complete a full football season without a loss or tie.

Western Washington challenged San Jose State to a postseason game in California, but the challenge was not accepted.

Western Washington was one of several teams, including Tennessee, TCU, West Tennessee State, Western Reserve, and Maryville, to complete the 1938 season without a loss or tie.

The team played its home games at Battersby Field in Bellingham.

== Schedule ==
Date	Opponent	Site	Result	Attendance	Source
September 30	Saint Martin's*	Battersby Field; Bellingham, WA	W 6–3	1,600	
October 8	Oregon Normal*	Battersby Field; Bellingham, WA	W 13–0		
October 15	Fort Lewis (WA)*	Battersby Field; Bellingham, WA	W 20–7		
October 22	Washington freshmen*	Battersby Field; Bellingham, WA	W 6–0		
October 29	at Central Washington	Ellensburg, WA (rivalry)	W 13–6		
November 5	vs. Pacific Lutheran	Lincoln Bowl; Tacoma, WA	W 33–14		
November 19	Eastern Washington^{†}	Battersby Field; Bellingham, WA	W 7–0	2,000	
*Non-conference game; ^{†}Homecoming

== Players ==
The following Western Washington players are confirmed from the coverage cited above.

- Fred Baldwin, center
- Don Bell, end
- Fritz Chorvat, quarterback and captain
- Jim Hall, end
- Jack Janikula
- Howard Jones, right halfback
- Al Munkres, fullback
- Leo Reischman, tackle
- Bob Tisdale, left halfback
- Bill Vanderboom, end
