= Abe Poffenroth =

American football and baseball coach (1917–1997)

Biographical details
- Born: November 26, 1917
- Died: May 1, 1997 (aged 79); Spokane, Washington, U.S.

Playing career

Football
- 1936–1939: Eastern Washington
- 1942: Second Air Force
- 1943: Pocatello AAB
- Position: Halfback

Coaching career (HC unless noted)

Football
- 1943: Pocatello AAB
- 1946: Eastern Washington (backfield)
- 1947–1952: Eastern Washington
- 1955–1960: Central Washington

Baseball
- 1950–1953: Eastern Washington

Head coaching record
- Overall: 58–43–3 (football); 41–54 (baseball)

Accomplishments and honors

Championships
- Football; 1 WINCO (1947); 5 Evergreen (1948–1950, 1957–1958)

Albert Harold "Abe" Poffenroth (November 26, 1917 – May 1, 1997) was an American college football and college baseball coach. He served as the head football coach at Eastern Washington College of Education—now known as Eastern Washington University from 1947 to 1952 and Central Washington College of Education—now known as Central Washington University—from 1955 to 1960. Poffenroth was also the head baseball coach at Eastern Washington from 1950 to 1953, tallying a mark of 41–54.

Poffenroth attended John R. Rogers High School in Spokane, Washington. He was a four-year letter winner in football as a running back at Eastern Washington, from 1936 to 1939. After graduating from Eastern Washington in 1940, Poffenroth was a teacher and assistant football coach in Vancouver, Washington. In 1942, he joined the United States Army Air Forces and was assigned to the Second Air Force. He played on the 1942 Second Air Force Bombers football team. After completing Officer Candidate School, Poffenroth was assigned to Pocatello Army Air Base. He was the head coach and a player for the 1943 Pocatello Army Air Base Bombardiers football team.

Poffenroth return to his alma mater, Eastern Washington, in 1946, when he was hired as head baseball coach, backfield coach for the football team, and junior varsity basketball coach. The following year, he succeeded Red Reese as head football coach.

Poffenroth died on May 1, 1997, at his home in Spokane.

== Head coaching record ==
=== Football ===
Year	Team	Overall	Conference	Standing	Bowl/playoffs
Pocatello Army Air Base Bombardiers (Independent) (1943)
1943	Pocatello AAB	0–3			
Pocatello AAB:		0–3			
Eastern Washington Savages (Washington Intercollegiate Conference) (1947)
1947	Eastern Washington	6–1–1	4–0–1	T–1st	
Eastern Washington Savages (Evergreen Conference) (1948–1952)
1948	Eastern Washington	8–1	5–1	T–1st	
1949	Eastern Washington	7–2	5–1	T–1st	
1950	Eastern Washington	8–2	5–1	1st	
1951	Eastern Washington	2–6	1–4	T–4th	
1952	Eastern Washington	1–7	1–5	6th	
Eastern Washington:		32–19–1	21–12–1		
Central Washington Wildcats (Evergreen Conference) (1955–1960)
1955	Central Washington	2–6	2–4	5th	
1956	Central Washington	3–4–1	2–3–1	5th	
1957	Central Washington	7–1	6–0	1st	
1958	Central Washington	6–1–1	4–1	T–1st	
1959	Central Washington	3–5	3–2	3rd	
1960	Central Washington	4–4	4–2	2nd	
Central Washington:		26–21–2	21–12–1		
Total:		58–43–3			
National championship Conference title Conference division title or championship game berth
