= 1946 Washington Intercollegiate Conference football season =

Washington Intercollegiate Conference
- Sport: Football
- Number of teams: 6
- Champion: Central Washington

Football seasons
- ← 1945 1947 →

1946 Washington Intercollegiate Conference football standings
	Conf.					Overall
Team	W		L		T	W		L		T
Central Washington $	5	–	0	–	0	6	–	2	–	0
Eastern Washington	3	–	1	–	1	4	–	3	–	1
Pacific Lutheran	2	–	2	–	1	3	–	3	–	1
Western Washington	2	–	3	–	0	4	–	4	–	0
Saint Martin's	1	–	4	–	0	2	–	4	–	0
Whitworth	1	–	4	–	0	1	–	7	–	0
$ – Conference champion

The 1946 Washington Intercollegiate Conference football season was the season of college football played by the six member schools of the Washington Intercollegiate Conference (WINCO) as part of the 1946 college football season.

The Central Washington Wildcats won the WINCO championship with a 6–2 record (5–0 against conference opponents).

== Conference overview ==
Conf. rank	Team	Head coach	Conf. record	Overall record	Points scored	Points against
1	Central Washington (Ellensburg)	John E. Londahl	5–0	6–2	134	104
2	Eastern Washington (Cheney)	Red Reese	3–1–1	4–3–1	124	65
3	Pacific Lutheran	Cliff Olson	2–2–1	3–3–1	80	62
4	Western Washington (Bellingham)	Charles Lappenbusch	2–3	4–4	92	96
5 (tie)	Saint Martin's	Hal H. Chapman	1–4	2–4	65	79
5 (tie)	Whitworth	Gerald Stannard	1–4	1–7	60	157

== Teams ==
=== Central Washington ===
1946 Central Washington Wildcats football

WINCO champion

Pear Bowl, L 8–13 vs. Southern Oregon
- Conference: Washington Intercollegiate Conference
- Record: 6–2 (5–0 WINCO)
- Head coach: John E. Londahl (1st season)

1946 Washington Intercollegiate Conference football standings
	Conf.					Overall
Team	W		L		T	W		L		T
Central Washington $	5	–	0	–	0	6	–	2	–	0
Eastern Washington	3	–	1	–	1	4	–	3	–	1
Pacific Lutheran	2	–	2	–	1	3	–	3	–	1
Western Washington	2	–	3	–	0	4	–	4	–	0
Saint Martin's	1	–	4	–	0	2	–	4	–	0
Whitworth	1	–	4	–	0	1	–	7	–	0
$ – Conference champion

The 1946 Central Washington Wildcats football team represented Central Washington University of Ellensburg, Washington. In their first and only year under head coach John E. Londahl, the Wildcats compiled a 6–2 record (5–0 against WINCO opponents), outscored opponents by a total of 134 to 104, and won the WINCO championship.

Date	Opponent	Site	Result	Attendance	Source
October 5	Whitworth	Ellensburg, WA	W 21–7		
	Washington junior varsity*		L 7–20		
October 19	at Western Washington	Bellingham, WA	W 31–26		
October 26	Saint Martin's	Ellensburg, WA	W 7–6		
November 2	at Pacific Lutheran	Tacoma, WA	W 27–20		
November 9	Eastern Washington^{†}	Ellensburg, WA	W 7–0		
November 16	at North Idaho Teachers*	Lewiston, ID	W 26–6		
November 28	at Southern Oregon*	Ashland, OR (Pear Bowl)	L 8–13	4,500	
*Non-conference game; ^{†}Homecoming

=== Eastern Washington ===
1946 Eastern Washington Savages football
- Conference: Washington Intercollegiate Conference
- Record: 4–3–1 (3–1–1 WINCO)
- Head coach: Red Reese (13th season)

The 1946 Eastern Washington Savages football team represented Eastern Washington University of Cheney, Washington. Led by head coach Red Reese, the Savages compiled a 4–3–1 record (3–1–1 against conference opponents), outscored opponents by a total of 124 to 65, and finished in second place in the WINCO.

Date	Opponent	Site	Result	Attendance	Source
September 28	North Idaho Teachers*	Cheney, WA	W 13–0	1,600	
October 5	at Montana*	Dornblaser Field; Missoula, MT (rivalry)	L 7–31		
October 11	Saint Martin's	Cheney, WA	W 28–6		
October 19	at Pacific Lutheran	Tacoma Stadium; Tacoma, WA	T 0–0		
October 26	Western Washington^{†}	Cheney, WA	W 20–0		
November 2	at Whitworth	Gonzaga Stadium; Spokane, WA	W 45–0		
November 9	at Central Washington	Ellensburg, WA	L 6–7		
November 16	Washington State junior varsity*	Cheney, WA	L 0–6		
*Non-conference game; ^{†}Homecoming

=== Pacific Lutheran ===
1946 Pacific Lutheran Lutes football
- Conference: Washington Intercollegiate Conference
- Record: 3–3–1 (2–2–1 WINCO)
- Head coach: Cliff Olson (14th season)

The 1946 Pacific Lutheran Lutes football team represented Pacific Lutheran University of Parkland, Washington. Led by head coach Cliff Olson, the Lutes compiled a 3–3–1 record (2–2–1 against conference opponents), outscored opponents by a total of 80 to 62, and finished in third place in the WINCO.

Date	Opponent	Site	Result	Attendance	Source
September 28	at Saint Martin's	Olympia, WA	W 26–6		
October 5	Washington junior varsity*	Tacoma, WA	L 7–13		
October 12	at Whitworth	Spokane, WA	W 14–0		
October 19	Eastern Washington	Tacoma, WA	T 0–0		
November 2	Central Washington	Tacoma, WA	L 20–27		
November 16	at Western Washington	Battersby Field; Bellingham, WA	L 0–9		
November 27	at Puget Sound*	Tacoma Stadium; Tacoma, WA	W 13–7		
*Non-conference game

=== Western Washington ===
1946 Western Washington Vikings football
- Conference: Washington Intercollegiate Conference
- Record: 4–4 (2–3 WINCO)
- Head coach: Charles Lappenbusch (11th season)
- Home stadium: Battersby Field

The 1946 Western Washington Vikings football team represented Western Washington University of Bellingham, Washington. Led by head coach Charles Lappenbusch, the Lutes compiled a 4–4 record (2–3 against conference opponents), were outscored by a total of 96 to 92, and finished in fourth place in the WINCO.

Date	Time	Opponent	Site	Result	Attendance	Source
October 5	8:00 p.m.	Puget Sound*	Battersby Field; Bellingham, WA	W 7–6		
October 12		at British Columbia*	Varsity Stadium; Vancouver, BC	W 25–0		
October 19		Central Washington	Bellingham, WA	L 26–31		
October 26		at Eastern Washington	Cheney, WA	L 0–20		
November 2		at North Idaho Teachers*	Lewiston, ID	L 6–26		
November 9		vs. Saint Martin's	Stevens Field; Olympia, WA	L 6–12		
November 11		Whitworth	Bellingham, WA	W 13–0		
November 16		Pacific Lutheran^{†}	Bellingham, WA	W 9–0	2,500	
*Non-conference game; ^{†}Homecoming; All times are in Pacific time

=== Saint Martin's ===
1946 Saint Martin's Rangers football
- Conference: Washington Intercollegiate Conference
- Record: 2–4 (1–4 WINCO)
- Head coach: Hal H. Chapman

The 1946 Saint Martin's Rangers football team represented Saint Martin's University of Lacey, Washington. Led by head coach Hal H. Chapman, the Rangers compiled a 2–4 record (1–4 against conference opponents), were outscored by a total of 79 to 65, and tied for last place in the WINCO.

Date	Opponent	Site	Result	Attendance	Source
September 28	at Pacific Lutheran	Olympia, WA	L 6–26		
October 11	at Eastern Washington	Cheney, WA	L 7–28		
October 19	at Whitworth	Spokane, WA	L 12–14		
October 26	at Central Washington	Ellensburg, WA	L 6–7		
	19th Fleet*		W 21–0		
November 9	vs. Western Washington	Stevens Field; Olympia, WA	W 12–6		
*Non-conference game

=== Whitworth ===
1946 Whitworth Pirates football
- Conference: Washington Intercollegiate Conference
- Record: 1–7 (1–4 WINCO)
- Head coach: Gerald Stannard (7th season)

The 1946 Whitworth Pirates football team represented Whitworth University of Spokane, Washington. Led by head coach Gerald Stannard, the Pirates compiled a 1–7 record (1–4 against conference opponents), were outscored by a total of 157 to 60, and finished in last place in the WINCO.

Date	Opponent	Site	Result	Attendance	Source
September 27	at Whitman*	Walla Walla, WA	L 6–7		
October 5	at Central Washington	Ellensburg, WA	L 7–21		
October 19	Saint Martin's	Spokane, WA	W 14–12		
October 12	Pacific Lutheran	Gonzaga Stadium; Spokane, WA	L 0–14		
October 26	at North Idaho Teachers*	Lewiston, ID	L 26–33		
November 2	Eastern Washington	Spokane, WA	L 0–45		
November 9	North Idaho Teachers*	Spokane, WA	L 7–12		
November 11	at Western Washington	Bellingham, WA	L 0–13		
*Non-conference game
