= Marv Tommervik =

American football player and coach (1919–2002)

Biographical details
- Born: April 23, 1919; Washington, U.S.
- Died: November 14, 2002 (aged 83); Washington, U.S.

Playing career

Football
- 1938–1941: Pacific Lutheran
- 1942: Naval Air Station Pasco
- 1946: Tacoma Indians
- Position: Halfback

Coaching career (HC unless noted)

Football
- 1947–1950: Pacific Lutheran

Baseball
- 1947–1951: Pacific Lutheran

Head coaching record
- Overall: 19–10–6 (.629) (football)

Accomplishments and honors

Championships
- Football; 1 WINCO (1947)

Awards
- 2× First-team Little All-American (1940, 1941)

Marvin Sigurd "Tommy Gun" Tommervik (April 23, 1919 – November 14, 2002) was an American football player and coach. He served as the head football coach at Pacific Lutheran University from 1947 to 1950, compiling a record of 19–10–6. Tommervik was drafted i nthe 20th round by the Philadelphia Eagles in 1942, but instead served for three years in the United States Navy during World War II. He played professionally for one year for the Tacoma Indians of the Pacific Coast Football League.

== Head coaching record ==
=== Football ===
Year	Team	Overall	Conference	Standing	Bowl/playoffs
Pacific Lutheran Lutes (Washington Intercollegiate Conference) (1947)
1947	Pacific Lutheran	7–0–2	4–0–1	T–1st	
Pacific Lutheran Lutes (Evergreen Conference) (1948–1950)
1948	Pacific Lutheran	6–2–1	4–2	3rd	
1949	Pacific Lutheran	2–5–2	2–3–1	4th	
1950	Pacific Lutheran	4–3–1	3–2–1	3rd	
Pacific Lutheran:		19–10–6	13–7–3		
Total:		19–10–6			
National championship Conference title Conference division title or championship game berth
