= 1940 Eastern Washington Savages football team =

American college football season

1940 Eastern Washington Savages football
- Conference: Washington Intercollegiate Conference
- Record: 6–2 (3–1 WINCO)
- Head coach: Red Reese (11th season)

1940 Washington Intercollegiate Conference football standings
	Conf.					Overall
Team	W		L		T	W		L		T
Pacific Lutheran $	4	–	0	–	0	8	–	0	–	0
Eastern Washington	3	–	1	–	0	6	–	2	–	0
Central Washington	2	–	2	–	0	4	–	3	–	0
Western Washington	1	–	3	–	0	3	–	4	–	0
Saint Martin's	0	–	4	–	0	1	–	6	–	0
$ – Conference champion

The 1940 Eastern Washington Savages football team represented Eastern Washington College of Education—now known as Eastern Washington University—as a member of the Washington Intercollegiate Conference (WINCO) during the 1940 college football season. Led by 11th-year head coach Red Reese, Eastern Washington compiled an overall record of 6–2 with a mark of 3–1 in conference play, placing second in the WINCO.

== Schedule ==
Date	Time	Opponent	Site	Result	Attendance	Source
September 28	7:00 p.m.	at Montana*	Dornblaser Field; Missoula, MN (rivalry)	L 0–9		
October 4		Puget Sound*	Cheney, WA	W 13–6		
October 12		Central Washington	Cheney, WA	W 14–7		
October 18		at Saint Martin's	Lacey, WA	W 7–0		
October 25		at Lewiston Normal*	Lewiston, ID	W 40–0		
November 2		Pacific Lutheran	Woodward Field; Cheney, WA	L 14–20	3,500	
November 8		Whitworth*	Cheney, WA	W 47–0		
November 16		at Western Washington	Bellingham, WA	W 7–6		
*Non-conference game; All times are in Pacific time
