= 1943 All-Service football team =

American military football players

The 1943 All-Service football team was composed of American football players who were selected as by various organizations and writers as the best football players at their respective positions who were serving in the military and playing on military service football teams in 1943.

== Ends ==
- Bob Fitch, Camp Lejeune (AP-1)
- Jack Russell, Blackland (AP-1)
- Perry Schwartz, Iowa Pre-Flight (AP-2)
- George Poschner, Ft. Benning (AP-2)

== Tackles ==
- John Mellus, Camp Davis (AP-1)
- Ray Bray, Del Monte Pre-Flight (AP-1)
- Joe Coomer, Camp Grant (AP-2)
- Vic Schleich, Sampson NTS (AP-2)

== Guards ==
- Marion Rogers, South Plains (AP-1)
- Buster Ramsey, Bainbridge (AP-1)
- Nick Kerasiotis, Iowa Pre-Flight (AP-2)
- Joe Routt, Ft. Benning (AP-2)

== Center ==
- Vince Banonis, Iowa Pre-Flight (AP-1)
- Quentin Greenough, Alameda Coast Guard (AP-2)

== Backs ==
- Glenn Dobbs, Randolph Field (AP-1)
- Len Eshmont, Del Monte Pre-Flight (AP-1)
- Dick Todd, Iowa Pre-Flight (AP-1)
- Bruce Smith, St. Mary's Pre-Flight (AP-1)
- Jack Jacobs, March Field (AP-2)
- Steve Juzwik, Great Lakes NTS (AP-2)
- Rogers Smith, Lubbock AAF (AP-2)
- Pat Harder, Georgia Pre-Flight (AP-2)

== Key ==
- AP = Associated Press

== See also ==
- 1943 College Football All-America Team
