= Charles Lappenbusch =

American sports coach (1908–1996)

- Lappenbusch in 1953

Biographical details
- Born: May 18, 1908; Lake Tapps, Washington, U.S.
- Died: September 30, 1996 (aged 88); Enumclaw, Washington, U.S.

Playing career

Football
- 1928–1929: Puget Sound
- 1930: Washington

Basketball
- 1928–1930: Puget Sound
- 1930–1931: Washington

Baseball
- 1928–1929: Puget Sound
- 1930: Washington

Track and field
- 1928–1929: Puget Sound
- 1930: Washington
- Positions: Guard, tackle (football)

Coaching career (HC unless noted)

Football
- 1931: Washington (AL/AF)
- 1932: Albany College (OR)
- 1933–1955: Western Washington

Basketball
- Unknown (Note: Lappenbusch coached basketball for 13 seasons, but the dates are unknown.): Western Washington

Baseball
- Unknown (Note: Lappenbusch coached baseball for six seasons, but the dates are unknown.): Western Washington

Tennis
- Unknown (Note: Lappenbusch coached tennis for 22 seasons, but the dates are unknown.): Western Washington

Golf
- Unknown (Note: Lappenbusch coached golf for two seasons, but the dates are unknown.): Western Washington

Administrative career (AD unless noted)
- 1932: Albany College (OR)
- 1933–1965: Western Washington

Head coaching record
- Overall: 81–70–15 (football)

Accomplishments and honors

Championships
- Football; 1 WINCO (1938); Evergreen (1951)

Awards
- NAIA Hall of Fame (1961); West. Washington Athletic Hall of Fame (1976)

Charles Frank Lappenbusch Sr. (May 18, 1908 – September 30, 1996) was an American athlete and sports coach. He was best known for his time at Western Washington University, in which he served from 1933 to 1975 and coached football, basketball, baseball, tennis and golf.

A native of Washington, Lappenbusch attended the University of Puget Sound before transferring to the University of Washington. He played as a lineman for both schools' football teams, and was named All-Pacific Northwest as a senior in 1930. Afterwards, he served for one year as an assistant football coach for Washington. In 1932, Lappenbusch became athletic director and head coach at Albany College (now known as Lewis & Clark College), a position in which he served for one season.

Lappenbusch was hired at Bellingham Normal School (now Western Washington University) in 1933, and went on to serve in various positions through 1975. He coached football for 20 seasons and was their all-time wins leader at the time of his retirement in 1955. He also coached basketball for 13 seasons, baseball for six years, tennis for 22 years, and golf two seasons, and was a member of the physical education department for 42 years. Lappenbusch was inducted into the NAIA Hall of Fame in 1961 and received national recognition for his development of the "Straight Line Philosophy," in addition to other innovations.

== Early life and education ==
Lappenbusch was born on May 18, 1908, at Lake Tapps in Washington, United States. He attended the University of Puget Sound for two years before transferring to the University of Washington to major in pre-medical. He played right tackle for Puget Sound under coach Cac Hubbard and was awarded a varsity jacket as well as the Mahncke Award for highest scholastic average. Lappenbusch played for Washington as a guard in 1930 and was selected first-team All-Pacific Northwest by Associated Press (AP) despite missing several games due to injury. Some sources also stated that he was named an All-American. During his time at Puget Sound and Washington, he also participated in basketball, baseball, and track and field.

== Coaching career ==
After graduating from the University of Washington, from which he received a bachelor's degree and master's degree, Lappenbusch was hired by the school as assistant football line coach in 1931. He also assisted in coaching the freshman team that year. The following year, Lappenbusch began serving as athletic director, physical education director, and head football coach at Albany College (now known as Lewis & Clark College).

After one season in the position, Lappenbusch left for Bellingham Normal School (now known as Western Washington University). "I had been canned by the depression," he later recalled. "I was teaching and coaching at Albany College in Oregon for $2,400 when they ran out of money. There was an opening [at Bellingham Normal] and I felt fortunate to get the job for the same money I was receiving, especially since the fellow who replaced me at Albany was cut to $500. That $2400 then was a pretty good salary." He began as athletic director and football coach.

Lappenbusch went on to serve with the school for 42 years. He coached the football team for 20 seasons, from 1933 to 1955 (as they did not play from 1943 to 1945 due to World War II), the tennis team for 22 years, the basketball team for 13 seasons, the baseball team for six seasons, and the golf team for two years. He also was a member of the physical education department until retiring in 1975.

A 1961 inductee into the NAIA Hall of Fame, Lappenbusch compiled an 81–62–15 record as Western Washington's football coach. His record was at the time the best in school history and in 1938 his team posted their only-ever undefeated, untied season. Lappenbusch also made several innovations to the game, including: being among the first coaches to provide his players with long underwear and gloves for cold weather; had his players take vitamins, 50 years before it became common; and redesigned protective equipment which, although was rejected, was introduced by others almost exactly the same several years later and accepted. Lappenbusch also designed a type of mass-produced varsity jacket and was the author of the "Straight Line Philosophy" in football and basketball which received national recognition.

Lappenbusch's Straight Line theories were based on an observation from a coach that he served with at Washington in 1931: "Don't give a man a job he can't do." He was twice invited to speak at the NCAA convention about his Straight Line plans and it was immensely popular, influencing many coaches of the day, including Frank Leahy of Notre Dame. He wrote several books on the topic and was called a "genius" by many players that he coached, although "his theories and lectures were so complicated that those in attendance often didn't know whether to take notes or laugh," according to The Bellingham Herald.

== Personal life and death ==
Lappenbusch was described as "frugal, allergic to a host of different foods and often absent-minded." He was inducted into the Western Washington Athletic Hall of Fame in 1976 and died in September 1996 in Enumclaw, Washington.

== Works ==
- Football-straight Line Philosophy: Kill the "T.". 1952.
- Basketball Straight Line Defense. 1953.
- Football-straight Line Philosophy: Offense. 1954.

== Head football coaching record ==
Year	Team	Overall	Conference	Standing	Bowl/playoffs
Albany College (Independent) (1932)
1932	Albany College	0–8			
Albany College:		0–8			
Western Washington Vikings (Tri-Normal Conference) (1933–1937)
1933	Western Washington	1–5	0–2	3rd	
1934	Western Washington	2–2–3	0–1–1	T–2nd	
1935	Western Washington	4–1–3	1–1	2nd	
1936	Western Washington	4–4	0–2	3rd	
1937	Western Washington	4–2–1	1–1	2nd	
Western Washington Vikings (Washington Intercollegiate Conference) (1938–1947)
1938	Western Washington	7–0	3–0	1st	
1939	Western Washington	5–2	1–2	T–3rd	
1940	Western Washington	3–4	1–3	4th	
1941	Western Washington	5–2–1	2–2	3rd	
1942	Western Washington	1–4–2	0–3–2	5th	
1943	No team—World War II				
1944	No team—World War II				
1945	No team—World War II				
1946	Western Washington	4–4	2–3	4th	
1947	Western Washington	5–3	3–2	3rd	
Western Washington Vikings (Evergreen Conference) (1948–1955)
1948	Western Washington	5–4	2–4	6th	
1949	Western Washington	4–4–1	3–2–1	3rd	
1950	Western Washington	7–2–1	4–1–1	2nd	
1951	Western Washington	8–1	4–1	T–1st	
1952	Western Washington	5–2–1	4–1–1	2nd	
1953	Western Washington	3–4–2	2–4	T–5th	
1954	Western Washington	3–5	3–3	4th	
1955	Western Washington	1–7	0–6	7th	
Western Washington:		81–62–15	36–44–6		
Total:		81–70–15			
National championship Conference title Conference division title or championship game berth
