= Cliff Olson =

American football player and coach (1905–1990)

Biographical details
- Born: February 7, 1905; Benson, Minnesota, U.S.
- Died: December 6, 1990 (aged 85); Tacoma, Washington, U.S.

Playing career

Football
- 1923–1926: Luther

Basketball
- 1926–1927: Luther

Track and field
- 1926–1927: Luther

Coaching career (HC unless noted)

Football
- 1927: Marshall HS (MN)
- 1928: Spokane College
- 1929–1941: Pacific Lutheran
- 1946: Pacific Lutheran

Basketball
- 1927–1928: Marshall HS (MN)
- 1928–1929: Spokane College
- 1929–1941: Pacific Lutheran

Accomplishments and honors

Championships
- Football; 3 WINCO (1939–1941)

Clifford Orin Olson (February 7, 1905 – December 6, 1990) was an American college football, college basketball, and college baseball coach. He served as the head football coach at Pacific Lutheran University from 1926 to 1941 and again in 1946, compiling a record of 64–33–6. His 64 wins were the most of any coach in the history of the Pacific Lutheran Lutes football program until he was surpassed by Frosty Westering. Olson also coached track, golf, and tennis as Pacific Lutheran. He was the school's athletic director and taught Latin, history, and physical education.

Olson was born on February 7, 1905, in Benson, Minnesota. He graduated in 1927 with a bachelor's degree from Luther College in Decorah, Iowa. At Luther he played on the football team from 1923 to 1926, the basketball team in 1926–27, and the track and field team from 1926 to 1927.

Olson began his coaching career in the fall of 1927 as football coach at Marshall High School in Marshall, Minnesota. He also coached basketball at Marshall High School before moving in 1928 to Spokane College in Spokane, Washington, where he coached football, basketball, and baseball.

Olson died on December 6, 1990.

== Head coaching record ==
=== College football ===
Year	Team	Overall	Conference	Standing	Bowl/playoffs
Spokane College Chieftains (Columbia Valley Conference) (1928)
1928	Spokane College				
Spokane College:					
Pacific Lutheran Gladiators (Independent) (1929–1937)
1929	Pacific Lutheran	3–3			
1930	Pacific Lutheran	5–2			
1931	Pacific Lutheran	6–3			
1932	Pacific Lutheran	3–4			
1933	Pacific Lutheran	1–5			
1934	Pacific Lutheran	5–2			
1935	Pacific Lutheran	5–1–1			
1936	Pacific Lutheran	5–0–2			
1937	Pacific Lutheran	3–3–1			
Pacific Lutheran Gladiators / Lutes (Washington Intercollegiate Conference) (1938–1941)
1938	Pacific Lutheran	2–5–1	0–3	4th	
1939	Pacific Lutheran	7–1	2–1	T–1st	
1940	Pacific Lutheran	8–0	4–0	1st	
1941	Pacific Lutheran	8–1	4–0	1st	
Pacific Lutheran Lutes (Washington Intercollegiate Conference) (1946)
1946	Pacific Lutheran	3–3–1	2–2–1	3rd	
Pacific Lutheran:		64–33–6	12–6–1		
Total:					
National championship Conference title Conference division title or championship game berth
