= Pacific Northwest Athletic Conference =

US College Sports conference

The Pacific Northwest Athletic Conference was an NAIA conference that operated from 1984 to 1998. Formed by the remnants of the Evergreen Conference, the conference broke up when most of its remaining members joined the NCAA's Pacific West Conference.

== Members ==
- The following is an incomplete list of the membership of the Pacific Northwest Athletic Conference.

Institution	Location	Founded	Nickname	Joined	Previous conference	Left	Conference joined	Current conference
Central Washington University	Ellensburg, Washington	1891	Wildcats	1984	Evergreen	1998	PWC	Great Northwest
Lewis–Clark State College	Lewiston, Idaho	1893	Warriors	1984	Evergreen	1998	Frontier	Cascade
Pacific Lutheran University	Tacoma, Washington	1890	Lutes	1984	Northwest	1986	Northwest	Northwest
Saint Martin's University	Lacey, Washington	1895	Saints	1984	Evergreen	1998	PWC	Great Northwest
Seattle University	Seattle, Washington	1891	Redhawks	1984	Evergreen	1996	Northwest	WAC
Simon Fraser University	Burnaby, British Columbia	1965	Clan	1984	Evergreen	1998	Independents	Great Northwest
Western Washington University	Bellingham, Washington	1893	Vikings	1984	Evergreen	1998	PWC	Great Northwest
Whitman College	Walla Walla, Washington	1859	Missionaries	1984	Evergreen; Northwest	1986	Northwest	Northwest
Whitworth University	Spokane, Washington	1890	Pirates	1984	Evergreen	1988	Northwest	Northwest
University of Alaska Southeast	Juneau, Alaska	1972	Humpback Whales	1986	Independents	1990	none	dropped sports 1990
Sheldon Jackson College	Sitka, Alaska	1896	Golden Seals	1986	Independents	1992	dropped sports	closed 2007
Northwest University	Kirkland, Washington	1934	Eagles	1987	Independents	1990	Independents	Cascade
University of Puget Sound	Tacoma, Washington	1888	Loggers	1989	PWC	1996	Northwest	Northwest
The Evergreen State College	Olympia, Washington	1967	Geoducks	1996	Independents	1998	Independents	Cascade
