= Adrian L. Beamer =

American football player, coach, and administrator (1923–2008)

Biographical details
- Born: February 5, 1923; Grove, Oklahoma, U.S.
- Died: August 20, 2008 (aged 85); Wenatchee, Washington, U.S.

Playing career
- 1941–1942: Eastern Washington

Coaching career (HC unless noted)
- 1961–1962: Central Washington

Administrative career (AD unless noted)
- 1963–1983: Central Washington

Head coaching record
- Overall: 11–6–1

Accomplishments and honors

Championships
- 1 Evergreen (1961)

Adrian L. "Bink" Beamer (February 5, 1923 – August 20, 2008) was an American college football coach and athletics administrator. He served as the head football coach at Central Washington University from 1961 to 1962, compiling a record of 11–6–1. Beamer was also the school's athletic director from 1963 to 1983. Beamer played college football at Eastern Washington University in Cheney, Washington, where he lettered in 1941 and 1942.

== Head coaching record ==
Year	Team	Overall	Conference	Standing	Bowl/playoffs
Central Washington Wildcats (Evergreen Conference) (1961–1962)
1961	Central Washington	7–2	6–1	1st	
1962	Central Washington	4–4–1	3–3–1	T–3rd	
Central Washington:		11–6–1	9–4–1		
Total:		11–6–1			
National championship Conference title Conference division title or championship game berth
