= 1939 Eastern Washington Savages football team =

American college football season

1939 Eastern Washington Savages football

WINCO co-champion
- Conference: Washington Intercollegiate Conference
- Record: 5–3 (2–1 WINCO)
- Head coach: Red Reese (10th season)

1939 Washington Intercollegiate Conference football standings
	Conf.					Overall
Team	W		L		T	W		L		T
Pacific Lutheran +	2	–	1	–	0	7	–	1	–	0
Eastern Washington +	2	–	1	–	0	5	–	3	–	0
Central Washington	1	–	2	–	0	5	–	2	–	0
Western Washington	1	–	2	–	0	5	–	2	–	0
+ – Conference co-champions

The 1939 Eastern Washington Savages football team represented Eastern Washington College of Education—now known as Eastern Washington University—as a member of the Washington Intercollegiate Conference (WINCO) during the 1939 college football season. Led by tenth-year head coach Red Reese, Eastern Washington compiled an overall record of 5–3 with a mark of 2–1 in conference play, sharing the WINCO title with Pacific Lutheran.

== Schedule ==
Date	Time	Opponent	Site	Result	Attendance	Source
September 22		Lewiston Normal*	Woodward Field; Cheney, WA	W 33–0		
September 29		Puget Sound*	Woodward Field; Cheney, WA	W 19–0		
October 6	8:00 p.m.	at Pacific Lutheran	Lincoln Bowl; Tacoma, WA	L 14–18		
October 13	3:00 p.m.	Whitworth*	Woodward Field; Cheney, WA	W 36–0		
October 20	2:30 p.m.	at Washington State freshman*	Rogers Field; Pullman, WA	L 12–20		
October 28		at Central Washington	Ellensburg, WA	W 7–0		
November 4		Western Washington	Woodward Field; Cheney, WA	W 14–0	3,000	
November 18	2:00 p.m.	at Gonzaga*	Gonzaga Stadium; Spokane, WA	L 0–27		
*Non-conference game; All times are in Pacific time; Source:
