= Thurmon Jones =

American football player and coach (1918–1988)

Biographical details
- Born: April 6, 1918; Wilson, Oklahoma, U.S.
- Died: January 16, 1988 (aged 69); Sweetwater, Texas, U.S.

Playing career
- 1938–1940: Abilene Christian
- 1941–1942: Brooklyn Dodgers
- Positions: Running back, defensive back

Coaching career (HC unless noted)
- 1943: Electra HS (TX)
- 1944–1945: Wichita Falls HS (TX)
- 1946–1947: Hardin
- 1948: Texas A&M (assistant)
- 1952–1955: Midland HS (TX)
- 1956–1958: Highland Park HS (TX)
- 1962: Washington (assistant)
- 1963–1966: Highland Park HS (TX)

Head coaching record
- Overall: 7–4 (college)

Accomplishments and honors

Championships
- 1 Texas Conference (1947)

Awards
- Second-team Little All-American (1940)

Thurmon Lee "Tugboat" Jones (April 6, 1918 – January 16, 1988) was an American football player and coach. For more than 20 years he coached high school football in the state of Texas.

A native of Wilson, Oklahoma, Jones attended Abilene Christian University, where he played running back and defensive back. In 1941 he joined the NFL's Brooklyn Dodgers, but did not see much playing time and eventually finished his playing career after the 1942 NFL season; instead he pursued a coaching career.

In 1943 he became head coach at Electra, a small community near Wichita Falls, Texas. Under his guidance, Electra was able to shut down Wichita Falls, one of the state's powerhouses at the time, with an obviously inferior team. So in 1944, when Wichita Falls coach Ted Jeffries left the school for Lamar College, Jones was hired as his successor. In 1945, Jones guided Wichita Falls into the state semifinals, where they faced Rusty Russell's Highland Park squad from Dallas, led by Doak Walker and Bobby Layne. Wichita Falls had little chance and lost 18–0.

Jones was briefly head coach at Hardin College—now known as Midwestern State University—in 1947 and the following year, served as an assistant coach at Texas A&M University, but returned to the high school level to coach at Midland High School in 1949. Four seasons later, Jones moved to Dallas, taking over at Highland Park, where he rewarded the boosters by producing a state championship in 1957. That year's Highland Park team also stopped Abilene High's 49-game winning streak. Jones left in 1959, but returned to Highland Park in 1963. He ultimately left Dallas in 1967. Jones also coached at the University of Washington.

== Head coaching record ==
=== College ===
Year	Team	Overall	Conference	Standing	Bowl/playoffs
Hardin Indians (Texas Conference) (1947)
1947	Hardin	7–4	4–1	T–1st	
Hardin:		7–4	4–1		
Total:		7–4			
National championship Conference title Conference division title or championship game berth
