= John P. Heinrick =

American football and basketball coach (1904–1995)

Biographical details
- Born: October 1, 1904; Tacoma, Washington, U.S.
- Died: May 15, 1995 (aged 90); Puyallup, Washington, U.S.
- Education: Washington (1926)

Playing career

Football
- c. 1921: Washington State

Baseball
- 1937: Johnson Painters

Coaching career (HC unless noted)

Football
- 1932–1944: Stadium HS (WA)
- 1948–1964: Puget Sound

Basketball
- 1947–1959: Puget Sound

Head coaching record
- Overall: 89–46–11 (college football); 187–159 (college basketball)

Accomplishments and honors

Championships
- Football; 5 Evergreen (1948–1949, 1951, 1953, 1956)

John Patrick Heinrick (October 1, 1904 – May 15, 1995) was an American football and basketball coach. He served as the head football coach at the University of Puget Sound from 1948 to 1964, compiling a record of 89–46–11. Heinrick was also the head basketball coach at from Puget Sound 1947 to 1959, tallying a mark of 187–159.

Heinrick died on May 15, 1995, of natural causes as a healthcare center in Puyallup, Washington.

== Head coaching record ==
=== College football ===
Year	Team	Overall	Conference	Standing	Bowl/playoffs
Puget Sound Loggers (Evergreen Conference) (1948–1964)
1948	Puget Sound	6–2–1	5–1	T–1st	
1949	Puget Sound	7–1	5–1	T–1st	
1950	Puget Sound	3–3–3	2–2–2	4th	
1951	Puget Sound	7–1	4–1	T–1st	
1952	Puget Sound	5–3–1	4–2	T–3rd	
1953	Puget Sound	7–1	5–1	T–1st	
1954	Puget Sound	6–2	5–1	2nd	
1955	Puget Sound	6–2	4–2	3rd	
1956	Puget Sound	8–0–1	6–0	1st	
1957	Puget Sound	4–3–1	4–1–1	2nd	
1958	Puget Sound	4–5	3–2	3rd	
1959	Puget Sound	6–1–1	3–1–1	2nd	
1960	Puget Sound	4–4–1	4–3	3rd	
1961	Puget Sound	5–3–1	3–3–1	4th	
1962	Puget Sound	6–2–1	5–1–1	2nd	
1963	Puget Sound	4–5	2–5	T–4th	
1964	Puget Sound	1–8	0–7	6th	
Puget Sound:		89–46–11	64–34–46		
Total:		89–46–11			
National championship Conference title Conference division title or championship game berth
