= 1940 Little All-America college football team =

American college football all-star team

The 1940 Little All-America college football team is composed of college football players from small colleges and universities who were selected by the Associated Press (AP) as the best players at each position. For 1940, the AP selected both a first team and a second team.

== First-team ==
Position	Player	Team
B	Dominic Collangelo	Newberry
B	Marv Tommervik	Pacific Lutheran
B	Owen Goodnight	Hardin–Simmons
B	Jack Hunt	Marshall
E	June Lingerfelt	Rollins
E	Jack Mulkey	Fresno State
T	Alex Schibanoff	Franklin & Marshall
T	Dave Evans	Muskingum
G	Nick Kerasiotis	St. Ambrose
G	Walter Ptak	Albion
C	Stuart Clarkson	Texas A&I

== Second-team ==
Position	Player	Team
B	Bill Glenn	Eastern Illinois State
B	Tony Canadeo	Gonzaga
B	Tommy Colella	Canisius
B	Thurmon Jones	Abilene Christian
E	Charles Schuster	Eastern Kentucky State
E	Russell Kaminsky	Springfield Teachers
T	Dick Noe	Colorado Mines
T	Boyce Jones	Mississippi College
G	Melvin Long	Kansas State Teachers
G	Herb Morelli	Redlands
C	Joe Coons	LIU

== See also ==
- 1940 College Football All-America Team
