= 1949 Puget Sound Loggers football team =

American college football season

1949 Puget Sound Loggers football

Evergreen co-champion
- Conference: Evergreen Conference
- Record: 7–1 (5–1 Evergreen)
- Head coach: John P. Heinrick (2nd season)
- Home stadium: Lincoln Bowl

1949 Evergreen Conference football standings
| | Conf. | | | | | Overall |
| Team | W | | L | | T | W | | L | | T |
|---|---|---|---|---|---|---|---|---|---|---|
| Puget Sound + | 5 | – | 1 | – | 0 | 7 | – | 1 | – | 0 |
| Eastern Washington + | 5 | – | 1 | – | 0 | 7 | – | 2 | – | 0 |
| Western Washington | 3 | – | 2 | – | 1 | 4 | – | 4 | – | 1 |
| Pacific Lutheran | 2 | – | 3 | – | 1 | 2 | – | 5 | – | 2 |
| Whitworth | 2 | – | 4 | – | 0 | 5 | – | 4 | – | 0 |
| Central Washington | 2 | – | 4 | – | 0 | 3 | – | 6 | – | 0 |
| Saint Martin's | 1 | – | 5 | – | 0 | 3 | – | 6 | – | 0 |
+ – Conference co-champions

The 1949 Puget Sound Loggers football team represented the College of Puget Sound—now known as the University of Puget Sound—as a member of the Evergreen Conference during the 1949 college football season. Led by second-year head coach John P. Heinrick, the Loggers compiled an overall record of 7–1 with a mark of 5–1 in conference play, sharing the Evergreen title with Eastern Washington. Puget Sound played home games at the Lincoln Bowl in Tacoma, Washington.

== Schedule ==
| Date | Time | Opponent | Site | Result | Attendance | Source |
|---|---|---|---|---|---|---|
| September 24 | 8:00 p.m. | Pacific Lutheran* | Lincoln Bowl; Tacoma, WA | W 27–0 | | |
| September 29 | 8:00 p.m. | Saint Martin's | Stevens Field; Olympia, WA | W 27–0 | | |
| October 8 | 8:00 p.m. | Eastern Washington | Lincoln Bowl; Tacoma, WA | W 13–7 | | |
| October 14 | | at Central Washington | Ellensburg, WA | L 13–21 | | |
| October 22 | 2:00 p.m. | Willamette*^{†} | Lincoln Bowl; Tacoma, WA | W 27–0 | 6,000 | |
| November 5 | 1:30 p.m. | at Whitworth | Pine Bowl; Spokane, WA | W 46–7 | 3,200 | |
| November 12 | 8:00 p.m. | Western Washington | Lincoln Bowl; Tacoma, WA | W 12–0 | | |
| November 18 | 8:00 p.m. | Pacific Lutheran | Lincoln Bowl; Tacoma, WA | W 20–0 | | |
*Non-conference game; ^{†}Homecoming; All times are in Pacific time
