= Owen Goodnight =

American football player (1917–1967)

No. 16
- Position: Halfback

Personal information
- Born: August 27, 1917; Holland, Texas, U.S.
- Died: May 13, 1967 (aged 49); San Marcos, Texas, U.S.
- Listed height: 6 ft 0 in (1.83 m)
- Listed weight: 200 lb (91 kg)

Career information
- High school: Holland
- College: Hardin–Simmons
- NFL draft: 1940: 15th round, 135th overall pick

Career history
- Cleveland Rams (1941)

Awards and highlights
- First-team Little All-American (1940)

Career NFL statistics
- Passing completions: 12
- Passing attempts: 36
- Completion percentage: 33.3%
- Passing yards: 182
- TD–INT: 1-5
- Passer rating: 20.6
- Stats at Pro Football Reference

Owen Goodnight (August 27, 1917 – May 13, 1967) was an American professional football halfback. He played for the Cleveland Rams in 1941. He was selected in the 15th round of the 1940 NFL draft with the 135th overall pick.
