= Sam Adams (Canadian football) =

American gridiron football player (1928–2015)

Profile
- Position: End

Personal information
- Born: July 25, 1928; Fort Worth, Texas, U.S.
- Died: November 13, 2015 (aged 87); Pullman, Washington, U.S.
- Listed height: 6 ft 3 in (1.91 m)
- Listed weight: 198 lb (90 kg)

Career information
- College: Whitworth

Career history

Playing
- BC Lions (1954–1955)

Coaching
- Whitworth (1956–1957) Assistant coach; Whitworth (1958–1964) Head coach; Washington State (1965–1967) Assistant coach

Samuel Houston Adams (July 25, 1928 – November 13, 2015) was an American professional football player and coach who was an end for the BC Lions of the Canadian Football League (CFL).

== Playing ==
Adams played college football at Whitworth University. Adams played 28 games with the Lions from 1954 to 1955, catching 53 receptions for 834 yards.

== Coaching ==
After his playing career ended, Adams returned to Whitworth as an assistant football and track coach. He was named head coach of both programs in 1958. His football teams amassed a 47–19–1 over seven seasons and won three Evergreen Conference championships. He left Whitworth in 1965 to become an assistant football coach at Washington State University. He became a full time member of the WSU faculty in 1968 and he earned his doctorate in physical education in 1969.

== Later life ==
Adams retired in 2002 and died in 2015, aged 87.

== Head coaching record ==
Year	Team	Overall	Conference	Standing	Bowl/playoffs
Whitworth Pirates (Evergreen Conference) (1958–1964)
1958	Whitworth	3–7	1–4	T–5th	
1959	Whitworth	8–1	4–1	1st	
1960	Whitworth	9–1	7–0	1st	
1961	Whitworth	9–1	6–1	2nd	
1962	Whitworth	6–3	6–1	1st	
1963	Whitworth	6–2–1	5–2	2nd	
1964	Whitworth	6–3	4–3	T–2nd	
Whitworth:		47–18–1	33–12		
Total:		47–18–1			
National championship Conference title Conference division title or championship game berth
