= 1949 Eastern Washington Savages football team =

American college football season

1940 Eastern Washington Savages football

Evergreen co-champion
- Conference: Evergreen Conference
- Record: 7–2 (5–1 Evergreen)
- Head coach: Abe Poffenroth (3rd season)
- Home stadium: Woodward Field

1949 Evergreen Conference football standings
	Conf.					Overall
Team	W		L		T	W		L		T
Puget Sound +	5	–	1	–	0	7	–	1	–	0
Eastern Washington +	5	–	1	–	0	7	–	2	–	0
Western Washington	3	–	2	–	1	4	–	4	–	1
Pacific Lutheran	2	–	3	–	1	2	–	5	–	2
Whitworth	2	–	4	–	0	5	–	4	–	0
Central Washington	2	–	4	–	0	3	–	6	–	0
Saint Martin's	1	–	5	–	0	3	–	6	–	0
+ – Conference co-champions

The 1949 Eastern Washington Savages football team represented Eastern Washington College of Education—now known as Eastern Washington University—as a member of the Evergreen Conference during the 1949 college football season. Led by third-year head coac Abe Poffenroth, the Savages compiled an overall record of 7–2 with a mark of 5–1 in conference play, sharing the Evergreen title with Puget Sound. Eastern Washington played home games at Woodward Field in Cheney, Washington.

== Schedule ==
Date	Time	Opponent	Site	Result	Attendance	Source
September 24	8:00 p.m.	Montana State*	Woodward Field; Cheney, WA	W 29–6	8,000	
October 1	8:00 p.m.	Western Washington	Woodward Field; Cheney, WA	W 13–6	4,000	
October 8	8:00 p.m.	at Puget Sound	Lincoln Bowl; Tacoma, WA	L 7–13		
October 15	2:00 p.m.	at Whitworth	Pine Bowl; Spokane, WA	W 27–20	5,000	
October 22	8:00 p.m.	Pacific Lutheran	Woodward Field; Cheney, WA	W 21–6	3,500	
October 29	2:00 p.m.	Central Washington^{†}	Woodward Field; Cheney, WA	W 20–0	7,500	
November 5	1:00 p.m.	at Montana*	Dornblaser Field; Missoula, MN (rivalry)	L 6–19		
November 12		at Northern Idaho*	Lewiston, ID	W 14–6		
November 19	8:00 p.m.	at Saint Martin's	Stevens Field; Olympia, WA	W 37–20		
*Non-conference game; ^{†}Homecoming; All times are in Pacific time
