= Sig Sigurdson =

American football player (1918–2006)

No. 56
- Positions: End, defensive end

Personal information
- Born: November 27, 1918; Seattle
- Died: December 2, 2006 (aged 88); Seattle
- Listed height: 6 ft 2 in (1.88 m)
- Listed weight: 206 lb (93 kg)

Career information
- High school: Ballard (WA)
- College: Pacific Lutheran

Career history
- Baltimore Colts (1947)

Career statistics
- Games: 8
- Stats at Pro Football Reference

Sigurd Frederick Sigurdson (November 27, 1918 – December 2, 2006) was an American football player who played at the end and defensive end positions.

A native of Seattle, both of his parents were born in Reykjavík, Iceland. He graduated from Ballard High School in Seattle.

Sigurdson played college football and basketball for Pacific Lutheran University.

Sigurdson played for the Takoma Indians of the Pacific Coast Conference in 1946. In July 1947, he signed a contract with the Baltimore Colts of the All-America Football Conference (AAFC). He played for the Colts during the 1947 season. He appeared in a total of eight AAFC games.

Sigurdson died in Seattle in 2006.
