= Central Washington–Western Washington football rivalry =

Past rivalry

- Sport: Football
- Teams: Central Washington Wildcats; Western Washington Vikings
- First meeting: 1922; Central Washington, 19–0
- Latest meeting: 2008; Central Washington, 49–21
- Trophy: Cascade Cup

Statistics
- Total meetings: 101
- All-time series: Central Washington leads, 62–34–5

Locations in Washington

The Central Washington–Western Washington football rivalry, also known as the Cascade Cup, and the Battle in Seattle, was an annual football game between Central Washington University and Western Washington University. The two teams first met in 1922 and Central leads the series. The rivalry has been compared to the larger Apple Cup rivalry between the Washington Huskies and the Washington State Cougars, which also includes schools based on the western and eastern site of the state.

The rivalry became a historic rivalry when Western Washington cut its football program in January 2009.

== Game results ==
Central Washington victories	Western Washington victories

No.	Date	Location	Winner	Score
1	1922	Ellensburg, WA	Central Washington	19–0
2	1922	Bellingham, WA	Western Washington	20–13
3	1923	Bellingham, WA	Western Washington	20–3
4	1923	Ellensburg, WA	Central Washington	19–0
5	1924	Ellensburg, WA	Western Washington	24–0
6	1925	Bellingham, WA	Western Washington	36–6
7	1926	Ellensburg, WA	Central Washington	13–9
8	1927	Bellingham, WA	Central Washington	13–7
9	1928	Ellensburg, WA	Central Washington	13–0
10	1929	Bellingham, WA	Central Washington	6–0
11	1930	Ellensburg, WA	Central Washington	26–0
12	1931	Bellingham, WA	Central Washington	7–0
13	1932	Ellensburg, WA	Central Washington	7–0
14	1933	Bellingham, WA	Central Washington	6–0
15	1934	Ellensburg, WA	Tie	0–0
16	1935	Bellingham, WA	Tie	0–0
17	1936	Ellensburg, WA	Western Washington	7–6
18	1937	Bellingham, WA	Western Washington	9–0
19	1938	Ellensburg, WA	Western Washington	13–6
20	1939	Bellingham, WA	Western Washington	12–0
21	1940	Bellingham, WA	Western Washington	13–12
22	1940	Ellensburg, WA	Central Washington	7–0
23	1941	Ellensburg, WA	Western Washington	19–13
24	1941	Bellingham, WA	Western Washington	19–7
25	1942	Bellingham, WA	Tie	0–0
26	1946	Bellingham, WA	Central Washington	31–26
27	1947	Ellensburg, WA	Western Washington	4–0
28	1948	Bellingham, WA	Central Washington	7–6
29	1949	Ellensburg, WA	Western Washington	20–8
30	1950	Bellingham, WA	Western Washington	26–0
31	1951	Ellensburg, WA	Western Washington	33–7
32	1952	Bellingham, WA	Western Washington	34–0
33	1953	Ellensburg, WA	Central Washington	23–12
34	1954	Bellingham, WA	Western Washington	12–0
35	1955	Ellensburg, WA	Central Washington	32–0
36	1956	Bellingham, WA	Central Washington	13–7
37	1957	Ellensburg, WA	Central Washington	27–6
38	1958	Ellensburg, WA	Western Washington	19–18
39	1959	Bellingham, WA	Western Washington	27–13
40	1960	Bellingham, WA	Central Washington	19–3
41	1960	Ellensburg, WA	Central Washington	33–0
42	1961	Bellingham, WA	Central Washington	19–13
43	1962	Bellingham, WA	Tie	6–6
44	1962	Ellensburg, WA	Central Washington	21–14
45	1963	Ellensburg, WA	Central Washington	19–0
46	1964	Bellingham, WA	Central Washington	7–0
47	1965	Bellingham, WA	Central Washington	19–6
48	1965	Ellensburg, WA	Western Washington	23–14
49	1966	Ellensburg, WA	Tie	6–6
50	1966	Bellingham, WA	Western Washington	37–28
51	1967	Bellingham, WA	Central Washington	31–0

No.	Date	Location	Winner	Score
52	1967	Ellensburg, WA	Central Washington	20–14
53	1968	Yakima, WA	Central Washington	14–7
54	1968	Bellingham, WA	Central Washington	7–3
55	1969	Bellingham, WA	Western Washington	15–12
56	1969	Ellensburg, WA	Central Washington	23–11
57	1970	Ellensburg, WA	Central Washington	35–14
58	1970	Bellingham, WA	Central Washington	24–7
59	1971	Ellensburg, WA	Western Washington	23–15
60	1972	Bellingham, WA	Central Washington	28–14
61	1973	Ellensburg, WA	Central Washington	17–7
62	1974	Bellingham, WA	Central Washington	13–9
63	1975	Ellensburg, WA	Central Washington	20–14
64	1976	Bellingham, WA	Western Washington	21–15
65	1977	Ellensburg, WA	Western Washington	21–10
66	1978	Bellingham, WA	Western Washington	23–7
67	1979	Ellensburg, WA	Central Washington	17–9
68	1980	Bellingham, WA	Central Washington	26–3
69	1981	Ellensburg, WA	Central Washington	44–7
70	1982	Bellingham, WA	Central Washington	21–0
71	1983	Ellensburg, WA	Central Washington	49–14
72	1984	Bellingham, WA	Central Washington	28–6
73	1985	Ellensbrug, WA	Central Washington	17–14
74	1986	Bellingham, WA	Central Washington	28–13
75	1987	Bellingham, WA	Central Washington	34–14
76	1988	Ellensburg, WA	Central Washington	37–20
77	1989	Bellingham, WA	Central Washington	21–15
78	1990	Ellensburg, WA	Central Washington	28–16
79	1991	Ellensburg, WA	Central Washington	22–13
80	1992	Bellingham, WA	Western Washington	37–7
81	1993	Ellensburg, WA	Central Washington	42–28
82	1994	Bellingham, WA	Western Washington	10–3
83	1995	Bellingham, WA	Western Washington	19–16
84	1995	Bellingham, WA	Central Washington	28–21
85	1996	Ellensburg, WA	Central Washington	34–20
86	1997	Ellensburg, WA	Central Washington	36–22
87	1998	Bellingham, WA	Central Washington	33–26
88	1999	Ellensburg, WA	Western Washington	27–7
89	2000	Bellingham, WA	Western Washington	35–22
90	2001	Bellingham, WA	Western Washington	36–14
91	2002	Ellensburg, WA	Central Washington	35–28
92	2003	Seattle, WA	Central Washington	29–20
93	2003	Bellingham, WA	Western Washington	17–16
94	2004	Seattle, WA	Western Washington	28–21
95	2004	Ellensburg, WA	Central Washington	31–17
96	2005	Seattle, WA	Central Washington	37–17
97	2005	Bellingham, WA	Central Washington	31–28
98	2006	Seattle, WA	Central Washington	42–28
99	2007	Seattle, WA	Central Washington	24–7
100	2008	Seattle, WA	Central Washington	50–28
101	2008	Ellensburg, WA	Central Washington	49–21
Series: Central Washington leads 62–34–5

== See also ==
- List of NCAA college football rivalry games
