= Nick Kerasiotis =

American football player (1918–2002)

No. 19
- Position: Guard

Personal information
- Born: July 4, 1918; Chicago, Illinois
- Died: May 23, 2002 (aged 83); Aurora, Illinois
- Listed height: 5 ft 11 in (1.80 m)
- Listed weight: 195 lb (88 kg)

Career information
- High school: Mooseheart Academy (Chicago, IL)
- College: St. Ambrose; Iowa
- NFL draft: 1942: undrafted

Career history
- Chicago Bears (1942; 1945)

Awards and highlights
- First-team Little All-American (1940)

Career NFL statistics
- Games played: 10
- Games started: 0
- Stats at Pro Football Reference

Nick Kerasiotis (July 4, 1918 – May 23, 2002) was an American professional football guard. He played for the Chicago Bears in nine games in the 1942 season and one game in the 1945 season.
