= Washington Intercollegiate Conference =

Defunct college athletic conference

The Washington Intercollegiate Conference (WINCO) was an intercollegiate athletic conference composed of member schools located in the state of Washington that operated from 1937 to 1948. The conference was formed in 1937 with four charter members. Three of the members had been a part of the disbanded Tri-Normal Conference: Central Washington College of Education (now known as Central Washington University), Eastern Washington College of Education (now known as Eastern Washington University), and Western Washington State College (now known as Western Washington University). The fourth charter member was Pacific Lutheran College (now known as Pacific Lutheran University). Saint Martin's College (now known as Saint Martin's University) and Whitworth College (now known as Whitworth University) later joined the WINCO. When the conference disbanded in 1948, the six member schools joined the newly-formed Evergreen Conference.

== Football champions ==
- 1938 – Western Washington
- 1939 – Eastern Washington & Pacific Lutheran
- 1940 – Pacific Lutheran
- 1941 – Pacific Lutheran
- 1942 – Central Washington
- 1943 – No champion
- 1944 – No champion
- 1945 – No champion
- 1946 – Central Washington
- 1947 – Eastern Washington & Pacific Lutheran

== Yearly football standings ==
1938 Washington Intercollegiate Conference football standings
	Conf.					Overall
Team	W		L		T	W		L		T
Western Washington $	3	–	0	–	0	7	–	0	–	0
Eastern Washington	2	–	1	–	0	6	–	2	–	1
Central Washington	1	–	2	–	0	3	–	3	–	1
Pacific Lutheran	0	–	3	–	0	2	–	5	–	1
$ – Conference champion

1939 Washington Intercollegiate Conference football standings
	Conf.					Overall
Team	W		L		T	W		L		T
Pacific Lutheran +	2	–	1	–	0	7	–	1	–	0
Eastern Washington +	2	–	1	–	0	5	–	3	–	0
Central Washington	1	–	2	–	0	5	–	2	–	0
Western Washington	1	–	2	–	0	5	–	2	–	0
+ – Conference co-champions

1940 Washington Intercollegiate Conference football standings
	Conf.					Overall
Team	W		L		T	W		L		T
Pacific Lutheran $	4	–	0	–	0	8	–	0	–	0
Eastern Washington	3	–	1	–	0	6	–	2	–	0
Central Washington	2	–	2	–	0	4	–	3	–	0
Western Washington	1	–	3	–	0	3	–	4	–	0
Saint Martin's	0	–	4	–	0	1	–	6	–	0
$ – Conference champion

1941 Washington Intercollegiate Conference football standings
	Conf.					Overall
Team	W		L		T	W		L		T
Pacific Lutheran $	4	–	0	–	0	8	–	1	–	0
Eastern Washington	2	–	1	–	1	5	–	2	–	1
Western Washington	2	–	2	–	0	5	–	2	–	1
Saint Martin's	0	–	2	–	2	1	–	4	–	2
Central Washington	0	–	3	–	1	1	–	5	–	1
$ – Conference champion

1942 Washington Intercollegiate Conference football standings
	Conf.					Overall
Team	W		L		T	W		L		T
Central Washington $	4	–	1	–	1	5	–	1	–	2
Saint Martin's	3	–	1	–	0	6	–	2	–	0
Eastern Washington	2	–	2	–	0	3	–	4	–	0
Pacific Lutheran	1	–	3	–	1	2	–	5	–	1
Western Washington	0	–	3	–	2	1	–	4	–	2
$ – Conference champion

1946 Washington Intercollegiate Conference football standings
	Conf.					Overall
Team	W		L		T	W		L		T
Central Washington $	5	–	0	–	0	6	–	2	–	0
Eastern Washington	3	–	1	–	1	4	–	3	–	1
Pacific Lutheran	2	–	2	–	1	3	–	3	–	1
Western Washington	2	–	3	–	0	4	–	4	–	0
Saint Martin's	1	–	4	–	0	2	–	4	–	0
Whitworth	1	–	4	–	0	1	–	7	–	0
$ – Conference champion

1947 Washington Intercollegiate Conference football standings
	Conf.					Overall
Team	W		L		T	W		L		T
Pacific Lutheran +	4	–	0	–	1	7	–	0	–	2
Eastern Washington +	4	–	0	–	1	6	–	1	–	1
Western Washington	3	–	2	–	0	5	–	3	–	0
Central Washington	2	–	3	–	0	3	–	4	–	0
Saint Martin's	1	–	4	–	0	3	–	6	–	0
Whitworth	0	–	5	–	0	3	–	6	–	0
+ – Conference co-champions
