= Evergreen Conference =

The Evergreen Conference (EvCo) was an intercollegiate athletic conference composed of member schools located in the states of Idaho, Oregon, and Washington and, for a time, the Canadian province of British Columbia.

The conference was formed on February 17, 1948 with seven charter members, all located in the state of Washington. Six of the member schools had been a part of the Washington Intercollegiate Conference (WINCO): Central Washington College of Education (now known as Central Washington University), Eastern Washington College of Education (now known as Eastern Washington University), Pacific Lutheran College (now known as Pacific Lutheran University), Saint Martin's College (now known as Saint Martin's University), Western Washington State College (now known as Western Washington University), and Whitworth College (now known as Whitworth University. The seventh member, the College of Puget Sound (now known as the University of Puget Sound), had been a member of the Northwest Conference.

== Members ==
| Institution | Location | Founded | Nickname | Joined | Previous conference | Left | Conference joined | Current conference |
|---|---|---|---|---|---|---|---|---|
| Central Washington University | Ellensburg, Washington | 1891 | Wildcats | 1948 | WINCO | 1984 | PNWAC | Great Northwest |
| Eastern Washington University | Cheney, Washington | 1882 | Eagles | 1948 | WINCO | 1979 | Independent | Big Sky |
| Pacific Lutheran University | Tacoma, Washington | 1890 | Lutes | 1948 | WINCO | 1965 | Northwest | Northwest |
| University of Puget Sound | Tacoma, Washington | 1888 | Loggers | 1948 | Northwest | 1966 | Independent | Northwest |
| Saint Martin's University | Lacey, Washington | 1895 | Saints | 1948; 1982 | WINCO; Independent | 1951; 1984 | Independent; PNWAC | Great Northwest |
| Whitworth University | Spokane, Washington | 1890 | Pirates | 1948; 1982 | WINCO; Northwest | 1970; 1984 | Northwest; PNWAC | Northwest |
| Western Washington University | Bellingham, Washington | 1893 | Vikings | 1948 | WINCO | 1984 | PNWAC | Great Northwest |
| University of British Columbia | Vancouver, British Columbia | 1908 | Thunderbirds | 1949 | Northwest | 1959 | Independent | Independent |
| Eastern Oregon University | La Grande, Oregon | 1929 | Mountaineers | 1970 | Oregon | 1982 | Independent | Cascade |
| Oregon Institute of Technology | Klamath Falls, Oregon | 1947 | Owls | 1970 | Oregon | 1982 | Independent | Cascade |
| Southern Oregon University | Ashland, Oregon | 1882 | Raiders | 1970 | Oregon | 1982 | Independent | Cascade |
| Western Oregon University | Monmouth, Oregon | 1856 | Wolves | 1970 | Oregon | 1982 | Independent | Great Northwest |
| Seattle Pacific University | Seattle, Washington | 1891 | Falcons | 1978 | Independent | 1980 | Independent | Great Northwest |
| Lewis–Clark State College | Lewiston, Idaho | 1893 | Warriors | 1982 | Independent | 1984 | PNWAC | Frontier |
| Seattle University | Seattle, Washington | 1891 | Redhawks | 1982 | Independent; WCC | 1984 | PNWAC | WAC |
| Simon Fraser University | Burnaby, British Columbia | 1965 | Clan | 1982 | Independent | 1984 | PNWAC | Great Northwest |
| Whitman College | Walla Walla, Washington | 1859 | Missionaries | 1982 | Northwest | 1984 | Northwest/ PNWAC | Northwest |

=== Membership timeline ===
Full member (all sports)

== Football champions ==
- 1948 – Eastern Washington and Puget Sound
- 1949 – Eastern Washington and Puget Sound
- 1950 – Eastern Washington
- 1951 – Pacific Lutheran, Puget Sound, and Western Washington
- 1952 – Pacific Lutheran
- 1953 – Puget Sound and Whitworth
- 1954 – Whitworth
- 1955 – Whitworth
- 1956 – Puget Sound
- 1957 – Central Washington
- 1958 – Central Washington and Western Washington
- 1959 – Whitworth
- 1960 – Whitworth
- 1961 – Central Washington
- 1962 – Whitworth
- 1963 – Central Washington
- 1964 – Pacific Lutheran
- 1965 – Eastern Washington
- 1966 – Eastern Washington
- 1967 – Eastern Washington
- 1968 – Central Washington
- 1969 – Eastern Washington and Western Washington
- 1970 – Central Washington
- 1971 – Western Washington
- 1972 – Central Washington
- 1973 – Central Washington
- 1974 – Oregon Tech
- 1975 – Western Oregon
- 1976 – Western Oregon
- 1977 – Western Oregon
- 1978 – Western Oregon
- 1979 – Western Oregon
- 1980 – Eastern Oregon, Oregon Tech, and Western Oregon
- 1981 – Oregon Tech
- 1982 – Central Washington and Oregon Tech
- 1983 – Puget Sound
- 1984 – Central Washington

== See also ==
- List of defunct college football conferences
- List of Evergreen Conference football standings
