= Saint Martin's Saints =

- University: Saint Martin's University
- NCAA: Division II
- Conference: Great Northwest Athletic Conference
- Athletic director: Theresa Hanson
- Location: Lacey, Washington
- Varsity teams: 13
- Basketball arena: Marcus Pavilion (1967)
- Baseball stadium: SMU Baseball Field
- Nickname: Saints
- Colors: Red and black
- Mascot: Marty
- Website: smusaints.com
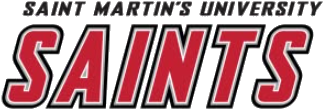

The Saint Martin's Saints (also SMU Saints) are the 13 varsity athletic teams that represent Saint Martin's University, located in Lacey, Washington, in NCAA Division II intercollegiate sports. The Saints compete as members of the Great Northwest Athletic Conference for all sports.

== Varsity sports ==
The women's basketball team qualified for the NCAA Division II tournament in 1992 and 2008. In the 1940s and 1950s, Saint Martin's had a college football team and a high school football team, which won the Washington Class A championship. In the 1990s, the name of the mascot was almost changed to the Ravens.

In 2008, the men's basketball team defeated Division I Colorado State of the Mountain West Conference, making it Saint Martin's' first major publicized victory over a D-I opponent. In 2009, the men's soccer team seized the first team title in any sport for Saint Martin's University, winning the Great Northwest Athletic Conference. In 2010, the university hosted a training camp which featured the University of Washington Huskies men's basketball team.

=== Teams ===
==== Men's ====
- Baseball
- Basketball
- Cross country
- Golf
- Soccer
- Track & field

==== Women's ====
- Basketball
- Cross country
- Golf
- Soccer
- Softball
- Track & field
- Volleyball
