= List of Miami Hurricanes football seasons =

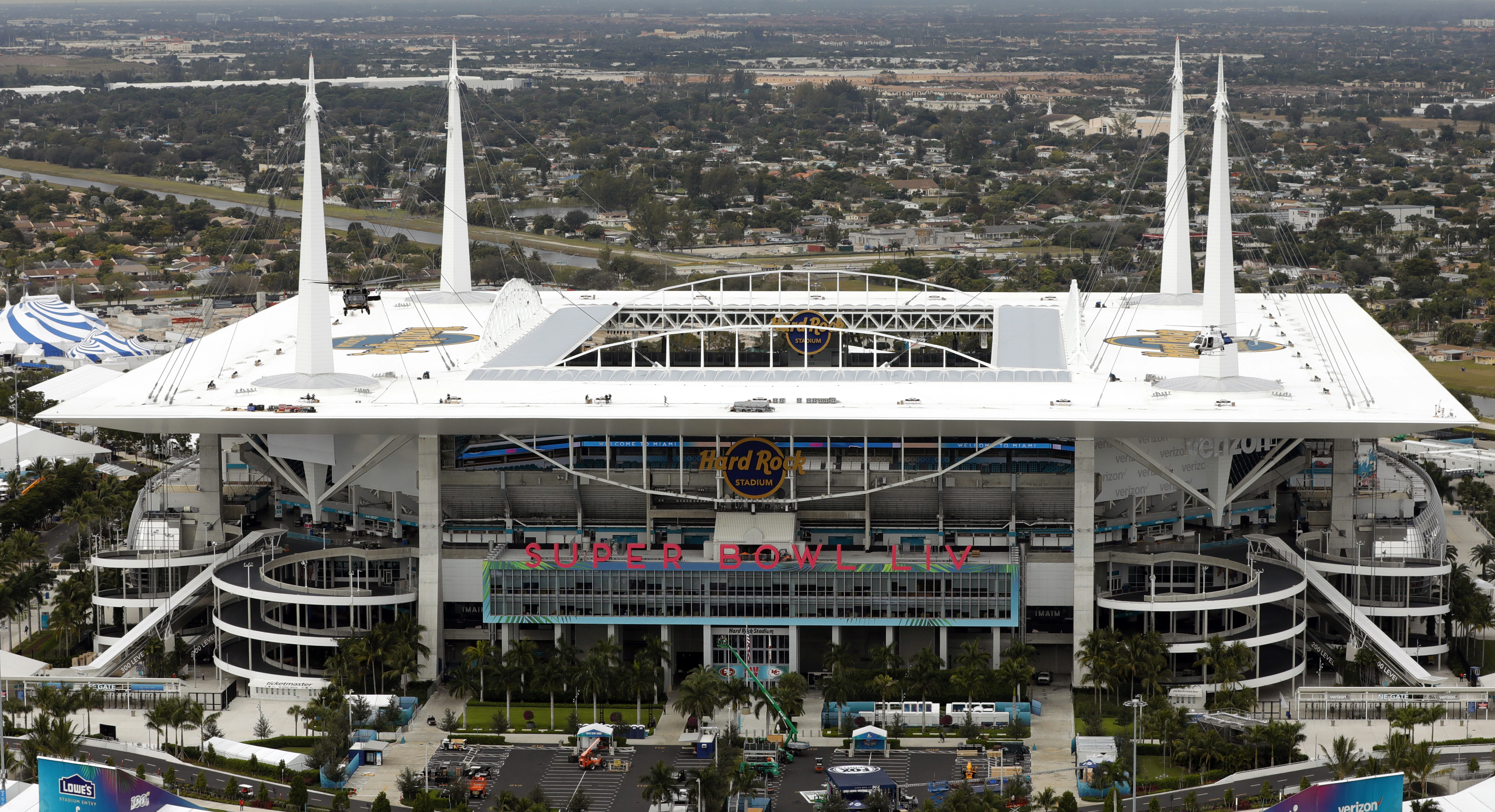
Hard Rock Stadium in Miami Gardens, the home field for the Miami Hurricanes football team

The following is the list of Miami Hurricanes football seasons by Miami Hurricanes football program.

== Seasons ==
Year	Coach	Overall	Conference	Standing	Bowl/playoffs	Coaches^{#}	AP^{°}
Howard P. Buck (Independent) (1926–1928)
1926	Howard P. Buck	8–0					
1927	Howard P. Buck	3–6–1					
1928	Howard P. Buck	4–4–1					
J. Burton Rix (SIAA) (1929)
1929	J. Burton Rix	3–2	3–2	T–13th			
Ernest E. Brett (SIAA) (1930)
1930	Ernest E. Brett	3–4–1	2–3–1	18th			
Tom McCann (SIAA) (1931–1934)
1931	Tom McCann	4–8	2–3	T–17th			
1932	Tom McCann	4–3–1	0–2–1	24th	W Festival of Palms		
1933	Tom McCann	5–1–2	2–0–1	6th	L Festival of Palms		
1934	Tom McCann	5–3–1	2–1–1	11th	L Orange		
Irl Tubbs (SIAA) (1935–1936)
1935	Irl Tubbs	5–3	1–1	16th			
1936	Irl Tubbs	6–2–2	3–0	3rd			
Jack Harding (SIAA) (1937–1941)
1937	Jack Harding	4–4–1	1–0	6th			
1938	Jack Harding	8–2	3–0	3rd			
1939	Jack Harding	5–5	2–0	4th			
1940	Jack Harding	3–7	2–1	T–11th			
1941	Jack Harding	8–2	2–0	2nd			
Jack Harding (Independent) (1942)
1942	Jack Harding	7–2					
Eddie Dunn (Independent) (1943–1944)
1943	Eddie Dunn	5–1					
1944	Eddie Dunn	1–7–1					
Jack Harding (Independent) (1945–1947)
1945	Jack Harding	9–1–1			W Orange		
1946	Jack Harding	8–2					
1947	Jack Harding	2–7–1					
Andy Gustafson (Independent) (1948–1963)
1948	Andy Gustafson	4–6					
1949	Andy Gustafson	6–3					
1950	Andy Gustafson	9–1–1			L Orange	13	15
1951	Andy Gustafson	8–3			W Gator		
1952	Andy Gustafson	4–7					
1953	Andy Gustafson	4–5					
1954	Andy Gustafson	8–1				9	11
1955	Andy Gustafson	6–3				18	14
1956	Andy Gustafson	8–1–1				6	6
1957	Andy Gustafson	5–4–1					
1958	Andy Gustafson	2–8					
1959	Andy Gustafson	6–4					
1960	Andy Gustafson	6–4					
1961	Andy Gustafson	7–4			L Liberty	19	
1962	Andy Gustafson	7–4			L Gotham	18	
1963	Andy Gustafson	3–7					
Charlie Tate (Independent) (1964–1970)
1964	Charlie Tate	4–5–1					
1965	Charlie Tate	5–4–1					
1966	Charlie Tate	8–2–1			W Liberty	10	9
1967	Charlie Tate	7–4			L Bluebonnet		
1968	Charlie Tate	5–5					
1969	Charlie Tate	4–6					
1970	Charlie Tate (Note: The team was led by seventh-year head coach Charlie Tate until he resigned after the first two games of the season. Walt Kichefski took over as interim head coach for the remainder of the season.)	3–8					
Fran Curci (Independent) (1971–1972)
1971	Fran Curci	4–7					
1972	Fran Curci	5–6					
Pete Elliott (Independent) (1973–1974)
1973	Pete Elliott	5–6					
1974	Pete Elliott	6–5					
Carl Selmer (Independent) (1975–1976)
1975	Carl Selmer	2–8					
1976	Carl Selmer	3–8					
Lou Saban (Independent) (1977–1978)
1977	Lou Saban	3–8					
1978	Lou Saban	6–5					
Howard Schnellenberger (Independent) (1979–1983)
1979	Howard Schnellenberger	5–6					
1980	Howard Schnellenberger	9–3			W Peach	18	18
1981	Howard Schnellenberger	9–2					8
1982	Howard Schnellenberger	7–4					
1983	Howard Schnellenberger	11–1			W Orange	1	1
Jimmy Johnson (Independent) (1984–1988)
1984	Jimmy Johnson	8–5			L Fiesta		18
1985	Jimmy Johnson	10–2			L Sugar	8	9
1986	Jimmy Johnson	11–1			L Fiesta	2	2
1987	Jimmy Johnson	12–0			W Orange	1	1
1988	Jimmy Johnson	11–1			W Orange	2	2
Dennis Erickson (Independent) (1989–1990)
1989	Dennis Erickson	11–1			W Sugar	1	1
1990	Dennis Erickson	10–2			W Cotton	3	3
Dennis Erickson (Big East Conference) (1991–1994)
1991	Dennis Erickson	12–0	2–0	(Note: The Big East did not crown an official champion until 1993 when full league play began.)	W Orange	2	1
1992	Dennis Erickson	11–1	4–0		L Sugar	3	3
1993	Dennis Erickson	9–3	6–1	2nd	L Fiesta	15	15
1994	Dennis Erickson	10–2	7–0	1st	L Orange	6	6
Butch Davis (Big East Conference) (1995–2000)
1995	Butch Davis	8–3	6–1	1st	Ineligible (Note: The Hurricanes served a one-year bowl ban due to NCAA sanctions that were levied at the end of the season.)		20
1996	Butch Davis	9–3	6–1	1st	W Carquest	14	14
1997	Butch Davis	5–6	3–4	5th			
1998	Butch Davis	9–3	5–2	2nd	W MicronPC	21	20
1999	Butch Davis	9–4	6–1	2nd	W Gator	15	15
2000	Butch Davis	11–1	7–0	1st	W Sugar^{†}	2	2
Larry Coker (Big East Conference) (2001–2003)
2001	Larry Coker	12–0	7–0	1st	W Rose^{†}	1	1
2002	Larry Coker	12–1	7–0	1st	L Fiesta^{†}	2	2
2003	Larry Coker	11–2	6–1	1st	W Orange^{†}	5	5
Larry Coker (ACC) (2004–2006)
2004	Larry Coker	9–3	5–3	3rd	W Peach	11	11
2005	Larry Coker	9–3	6–2	2nd (Coastal)	L Peach	18	17
2006	Larry Coker	7–6	3–5	4th (Coastal)	W MPC Computers		
Randy Shannon (ACC) (2007–2010)
2007	Randy Shannon	5–7	2–6	5th (Coastal)			
2008	Randy Shannon	7–6	4–4	3rd (Coastal)	L Emerald		
2009	Randy Shannon	9–4	5–3	3rd (Coastal)	L Champs Sports	19	19
2010	Randy Shannon (Note: The Hurricanes were coached by Randy Shannon during the regular season, then coached by Jeff Stoutland during their bowl game following Shannon's firing.)	7–6	5–3	2nd (Coastal)	L Sun		
Al Golden (ACC) (2011–2015)
2011	Al Golden	6–6	3–5	T–4th (Coastal)	Ineligible (Note: Ineligible for ACC title, bowl game and Coaches' Poll for 2011 & 2012 seasons.)		
2012	Al Golden	7–5	5–3	T–1st (Coastal)	Ineligible		
2013	Al Golden	9–4	5–3	T–2nd (Coastal)	L Russell Athletic		
2014	Al Golden	6–7	3–5	T–5th (Coastal)	L Independence		
2015	Al Golden (Note: The Hurricanes were led by fifth-year head coach Al Golden, who was fired following a 58–0 loss at home to Clemson, and replaced by Larry Scott, who acted as the interim coach.)	8–5	5–3	3rd (Coastal)	L Sun		
Mark Richt (ACC) (2016–2018)
2016	Mark Richt	9–4	5–3	T–2nd (Coastal)	W Russell Athletic	23	20
2017	Mark Richt	10–3	7–1	1st (Coastal)	L Orange^{†}	11	13
2018	Mark Richt	7–6	4–4	3rd (Coastal)	L Pinstripe		
Manny Diaz (ACC) (2019–2021)
2019	Manny Diaz	6–7	4–4	3rd (Coastal)	L Independence		
2020	Manny Diaz	8–3	7–2	3rd	L Cheez-It	22	22
2021	Manny Diaz	7–5	5–3	2nd (Coastal)	CX Sun (Note: The Hurricanes accepted a bid to play in the Sun Bowl, where they were scheduled to face the Washington State Cougars. On December 26, the Hurricanes announced their withdrawal from the bowl, due to COVID-19 issues.)		
Mario Cristobal (ACC) (2022–present)
2022	Mario Cristobal	5–7	3–5	4th (Coastal)			
2023	Mario Cristobal	7–6	3–5	9th	L Pinstripe		
2024	Mario Cristobal	10–3	6–2	3rd	L Pop-Tarts	18	18
2025	Mario Cristobal	13–3	6–2	T–2nd	W CFP First Round^{†} W Cotton^{†} (CFP Quarterfinal); W Fiesta^{†} (CFP Semifinal); L CFP NCG^{†}	2	2
Total:		663–388–19					
National championship Conference title Conference division title or championship game berth
^{†}Indicates Bowl Coalition, Bowl Alliance, BCS, or CFP / New Years' Six bowl.; ^{#}Rankings from final Coaches Poll.
