= National Register of Historic Places listings in Jefferson County, Alabama =

Location of Jefferson County in Alabama

This is intended to be a complete list of the properties and districts on the National Register of Historic Places in Jefferson County, Alabama, United States. Latitude and longitude coordinates are provided for many National Register properties and districts; these locations may be seen together in an online map.

There are 178 properties and districts listed on the National Register in the county, including three National Historic Landmarks. 148 of these sites, including all of the National Historic Landmarks, are located in Birmingham, and are listed separately; another 31 sites are listed here. One district, the Red Mountain Suburbs Historic District, includes contributing properties located in the city of Birmingham and in adjacent parts of Jefferson County.

This National Park Service list is complete through NPS recent listings posted September 25, 2026.

== Current listings ==
=== Outside Birmingham ===
	Name on the Register	Image	Date listed	Location	City or town	Description
1	Jonathan W. Bass House	Jonathan W. Bass House	May 21, 2008 (#08000456)	1129 Montevallo Rd. 33°32′26″N 86°33′29″W	Leeds	
2	Cahaba Homestead Village Historic District	Cahaba Homestead Village Historic District	March 29, 2006 (#06000187)	Approximately between Interstate 59 and U.S. Route 11; 33°37′46″N 86°36′27″W	Trussville	
3	Canaan Baptist Church	Canaan Baptist Church	April 22, 2005 (#05000290)	824 15th St., N. 33°24′06″N 86°57′51″W	Bessemer	
4	Downtown Bessemer Historic District	Downtown Bessemer Historic District	July 15, 1992 (#92000852)	Roughly bounded by 21st St., N., Carolina Ave., 19th St., N., 5th Ave., N. and the former Southern railroad tracks 33°24′08″N 86°57′05″W	Bessemer	
5	Dunbar High School	Dunbar High School	March 18, 2011 (#10001051)	2715 6th Ave. N. 33°24′49″N 86°56′56″W	Bessemer	
6	Five Mile Creek Bridge		February 28, 1973 (#73000350)	1 mile northeast of McCalla off U.S. Route 11; 33°20′52″N 87°01′21″W	McCalla	
7	Flintridge Building	Flintridge Building	June 2, 2004 (#04000560)	6200 E.J. Oliver Boulevard; 33°28′33″N 86°55′09″W	Fairfield	
8	John D. and Katherine Gleissner Lustron House	John D. and Katherine Gleissner Lustron House	February 24, 2000 (#00000133)	2420 Cahaba Rd. 33°29′27″N 86°46′44″W	Mountain Brook	Demolished in 2015
9	Hollywood Historic District	Hollywood Historic District	May 16, 2002 (#02000482)	Roughly bounded by U.S. Routes 31 and 280 and Lakeshore Dr. 33°28′47″N 86°46′54″W	Homewood	
10	Leeds Downtown Historic District	Leeds Downtown Historic District	January 12, 1995 (#94001546)	Roughly bounded by 9th St., NE., Thornton and Railroad Aves., and Parkway Dr., SE. 33°32′34″N 86°32′21″W	Leeds	
11	Lustron House on Columbiana Road		February 24, 2000 (#00000131)	430 Columbiana Rd. 33°27′50″N 86°49′07″W	Homewood	Building no more existing.
12	Thomas McAdory House	Thomas McAdory House	December 26, 1972 (#72000161)	214 Eastern Valley Rd. 33°22′28″N 86°57′42″W	Bessemer	
13	Miles Memorial College Historic District	Miles Memorial College Historic District	January 3, 1994 (#93001031)	5501 Myron Massey Boulevard; 33°28′53″N 86°54′28″W	Fairfield	
14	Mountain Brook Estates Building	Mountain Brook Estates Building	April 8, 2003 (#03000232)	2803 Cahaba Rd. 33°29′02″N 86°46′24″W	Mountain Brook	
15	Mountain Brook Office Park Historic District		November 25, 2022 (#100008399)	2900 Cahaba Rd.,1-17 Office Park Cir., 100-510 Office Park Dr. 33°28′42″N 86°46′24″W	Mountain Brook	
16	Owen Plantation House		October 22, 1976 (#76000330)	South of Bessemer on Eastern Valley Rd. 33°20′50″N 86°59′00″W	Bessemer	
17	Dr. Thomas McAdory Owen House		January 21, 1982 (#82002038)	510 N. 18th St. 33°24′10″N 86°57′25″W	Bessemer	
18	Palmerdale Homesteads Historic District		November 21, 2019 (#100004642)	Parts of Miles Springs, N. & S. Valley, Brookwood, Southfield N. & S., Midwood, Marsh Mountain & W. Hill Rds., Helms Cir. & AL 75; 33°44′20″N 86°38′41″W	Pinson	
19	Parham Apothecary Building	Parham Apothecary Building	June 13, 1996 (#96000595)	401 60th St. 33°28′41″N 86°54′48″W	Fairfield	
20	Pinson Hills Historic District	Pinson Hills Historic District	January 19, 2016 (#15000975)	Roughly Cedar, Church, Main, Mountain, Pinson & Walnut Sts., Pinewood & Leslie Drs., Center Point & Silver Lake Rds. 33°41′29″N 86°40′43″W	Pinson	
21	Pinson Main Street Historic District	Pinson Main Street Historic District	January 19, 2016 (#15000976)	Roughly Clayton, Lane, Main & Spring Sts., Elm & Powell Aves., Marvin's Way, Old Bradford Rd. & Pinson Plz. 33°41′23″N 86°41′08″W	Pinson	
22	Red Mountain Suburbs Historic District	Red Mountain Suburbs Historic District	October 3, 1985 (#85002719)	Roughly bounded by Crest and Argyle and Altamont, Country Club, Salisbury, and Lanark Rds. 33°30′04″N 86°46′30″W	Mountain Brook	Extends into Birmingham
23	Redmont Garden Apartments		August 5, 1993 (#93000761)	2829 Thornhill Rd. 33°29′43″N 86°46′46″W	Mountain Brook	
24	Rosedale Historic District	Rosedale Historic District	March 31, 2004 (#04000236)	Roughly bounded by 25th Court, S., Central Ave., 27th Court, S., Loveless/BM Montgomery St. 33°29′07″N 86°47′39″W	Homewood	
25	Rosedale Park Historic District	Rosedale Park Historic District	March 31, 2004 (#04000235)	Roughly bounded by Woodcrest Place, 26th Ave., S., 18th St., S., and 25th Ct., S. 33°29′16″N 86°47′23″W	Homewood	
26	Sadler House	Sadler House	April 23, 1975 (#75000315)	3 miles south of McCalla on Eastern Valley Rd. 33°19′00″N 87°00′50″W	McCalla	
27	Southern Railroad Depot	Southern Railroad Depot	June 30, 1983 (#83002975)	933 Thornton Ave., NE. 33°32′37″N 86°32′20″W	Leeds	
28	Southern Railway Terminal Station	Southern Railway Terminal Station	February 28, 1973 (#73000348)	1905 Alabama Ave. 33°24′04″N 86°57′01″W	Bessemer	
29	Stonecroft		November 29, 2001 (#01001290)	1453 Shades Crest Rd. 33°26′16″N 86°49′11″W	Hoover	
30	Tarrant City Downtown Historic District	Tarrant City Downtown Historic District	April 26, 2010 (#09000105)	Parts of E. Lake Blvd., Ford Ave., Jackson Blvd., Pinson St., Wharton Ave. 33°34′56″N 86°46′14″W	Tarrant	
31	Bernice L. Wright Lustron House	Bernice L. Wright Lustron House	February 24, 2000 (#00000130)	2424 Cahaba Rd. 33°29′28″N 86°46′43″W	Mountain Brook	Demolished in 2015

== See also ==
- List of National Historic Landmarks in Alabama
- National Register of Historic Places listings in Alabama
