= Bessemer City Schools =

School district in Alabama

Bessemer City School District

Location
- Bessemer, Alabama United States

District information
- Type: Public
- Motto: Empowering students through excellence in education
- Grades: PK-12
- Established: 1887; 138 years ago
- Superintendent: Dr. Autumm Jeter
- Schools: 9
- Budget: $41.3 million (2015–16)
- NCES District ID: 0100330

Students and staff
- Students: 3,605 (2016–17)
- Teachers: 200.0 (FTE) (2016–17)
- Staff: 166.0 (FTE) (2016–17)

Other information
- Website: www.bessk12.org

Bessemer City School District is a school district in Jefferson County, Alabama first established in 1887. It is the second oldest public school system in the state's most populated county.

== Schools ==
- J. S. Abrams Elementary (K-5)
- Charles F. Hard Elementary (K-5; originally founded 1894)
- Greenwood Elementary (K-5) (founded 1937; operated as a Jefferson County School until 1966 when it was ceded to Bessemer)
- Jonesboro Elementary (K-5)
- Westhills Elementary (K-5)
- New Horizon Alternative
- Bessemer City Middle (6-8) (opened during 2013–14 school year) (building was previously Jess Lanier High School)
- Bessemer City High (9-12)
- Bessemer Center for Technology

== Former schools (partial list) ==
- Abrams High (closed 1987)
- Arlington Elementary (built 1910 and served as the first Bessemer High School until 1923; building demolished)
- Carver High School (all black student body) was located at 600 2nd Avenue North
- Clarendon High School (circa 1890s until 1910) (then became an Elementary School with the same name)
- James A. Davis Middle (originally called Clarendon Avenue Elementary; opened 1953, closed 2013; building demolished)
- Dunbar High School
- Jess Lanier High School (1970-2010)
- Roberts School (believed to be the first school in the system, likely built in the late 1880s; served grades 1-12 until construction of Clarendon High School)

== Failing schools ==
Based on the state standardized testing, this system had two schools in the bottom six percent statewide, marking them as "failing."

- Abrams Elementary School
- Bessemer City High School

== See also ==
- Education in Alabama
