= Euil Snider =

American sprinter (1905–1978)

Personal information
- Born: December 9, 1905 Adger, Alabama, United States
- Died: February 9, 1978 (aged 72)

Sport
- Sport: Sprinting
- Event: 400 metres

Euil "Snitz" Snider (December 9, 1905 – February 9, 1978) was an American sprinter. He competed in the men's 400 metres at the 1928 Summer Olympics. He graduated from Oak Grove High School in Jefferson County, Alabama and was on the track team at Auburn University. He was the head football coach at Bessemer High School from 1933 to 1963 and was later inducted into the Alabama Sports Hall of Fame. Snider died on February 9, 1978. In 1972, Bessemer Stadium where he had coached the Tigers for thirty years was renamed "Snitz Snider Stadium" in his honor.

== Head coaching record ==
Year	Team	Overall	Conference	Standing	Bowl/playoffs
Howard Seadogs (Independent) (1943)
1943	Howard	2–2			
Howard:		2–2			
Total:		2–2			
