= Continental Gin Company =

Continental Gin Company may refer to:

- Continental Gin Company (Birmingham, Alabama), listed on the National Register of Historic Places in Jefferson County, Alabama
- Continental Gin Company (Dallas, Texas), listed on the National Register of Historic Places in Dallas County, Texas
