= Eddie Dunn (American football) =

American football and baseball coach (1915–1980)

Biographical details
- Born: October 1, 1915
- Died: March 2, 1980 (aged 64); Miami, Florida, U.S.

Playing career

Football
- 1936–1938: Miami (FL)

Coaching career (HC unless noted)

Football
- 1943–1944: Miami (FL)

Baseball
- 1946–1954: Miami (FL)

Head coaching record
- Overall: 6–8–1 (football); 82–73–2 (baseball)

Edward Francis Dunn (October 1, 1915 – March 2, 1980) was an American football and baseball coach. He was the head football coach at University of Miami from 1943 to 1944 while Jack Harding served in the American military in World War II.

Dunn grew up in Miami. He lettered for the Miami Hurricanes football team from 1936 to 1938. In 1938, he played in the first Florida–Miami game, scoring all three touchdowns in a 19–7 Miami win. Dunn set several game, single-season and career UM records for rushing, scoring, and punt returns. Dunn went on to serve as head baseball coach from 1946 to 1954, guiding UM to an 82–73–2 record over his nine seasons. His 1947 club went 11–2, followed by his second-best mark of 14–8 in 1949, playing teams from the state of Florida, military bases and around the Southeast. He died at a Florida hospital in 1980 after a long illness.

In 2009, Dunn was inducted into UM's "Ring of Fame." Dunn's son Gary Dunn, who also played football at UM, represented him at the induction.

== Head coaching record ==
=== Football ===
Year	Team	Overall	Conference	Standing	Bowl/playoffs
Miami Hurricanes (Independent) (1943–1944)
1943	Miami	5–1			
1944	Miami	1–7–1			
Miami:		6–8–1			
Total:		6–8–1			
