= Adger, Alabama =

Unincorporated community in Alabama, United States

- Unincorporated community
- Location within Alabama Location within the United States
- Coordinates: 33°22′37″N 87°05′37″W
- Country: United States
- State: Alabama
- County: Jefferson County
- Elevation: 472 ft (144 m)
- ZIP code: 35006
- GNIS feature ID: 1921723

Adger is an unincorporated crossroads community in Jefferson County, Alabama, southwest of Birmingham.

Adger has a post office, a community storm shelter, one convenience store, which serves as a social hub & diner, and a handful of churches. Local businesses include construction, a goat's milk soap business, roofing, plumbing, hauling, and heavy equipment operation, dog groomer, and a sewing and alterations shop.

The community is served by a volunteer fire department as well as a Neighborhood Watch office, which doubles as a working office for Jefferson County sheriff's deputies who patrol the area. The unofficial mayor is Melanie Hyche who is known to run the local ladies auxiliary, and is credited with opening and running the neighborhood storm shelter, yearly car show, community sales, and bingo night. It is governed by the Jefferson County Commission and the various departments and facets of the County Government.

== History ==
The town is named for Andrew M. Adger, originally of Charleston, South Carolina. Mr. Adger moved to Bessemer, Alabama, when he became an investor in and secretary-treasurer of the Bessemer Land & Improvement Company. He also was an operating officer of the Debardeleben Coal & Iron Company. Adger is a rural community that arose in the late 1880s during development of Debardeleben's Adger, Johns, and Belle Sumter mines in the Blue Creek Coal Basin. The mines were operating at their peak in the early Twentieth Century. The Black Diamond Mine also operated in the Adger community along Blue Creek road where the mine's Hoist Tipple and Portal were located about 100 yards west of the Old Blue Creek Baptist Church. Since the closing of the mines the community has seen both periodic growth and decline. Currently ( March 2013 ) the Adger, Johns, Sumter and Black Diamond Coal mine sites are being strip mined by Drummond Company's Twin Pines Mining Company and only a few concrete foundations remain, hidden in the thick privet growth, that hint back to the original mining interest.

== Geography ==
Its location is about 5.0 miles (8.0 km) northwest and about 6.5 miles (10.5 km) from Interstates 20/59 which merge in Northeast Jefferson County and run through Jefferson County into Tuscaloosa County and northward into Walker County. It is the former location of Oak Grove High School on Lock 17 Road. An F5 tornado destroyed it on April 8, 1998. City-Data.com reports the area to be 131 square miles (340 km^{2}) with a population density of 23 per square mile. The zip code is 35006.

=== Climate ===
The climate in this area is characterized by hot, humid summers and generally mild to cool winters. According to the Köppen Climate Classification system, Adger has a humid subtropical climate, abbreviated "Cfa" on climate maps.

Climate data for Adger, Alabama
Month	Jan	Feb	Mar	Apr	May	Jun	Jul	Aug	Sep	Oct	Nov	Dec	Year
Mean daily maximum °C (°F)	12 (53)	14 (58)	19 (66)	24 (75)	28 (82)	32 (89)	33 (91)	33 (91)	30 (86)	24 (76)	19 (66)	13 (56)	23 (74)
Mean daily minimum °C (°F)	−1 (30)	1 (33)	4 (40)	9 (48)	14 (57)	18 (65)	20 (68)	20 (68)	17 (62)	10 (50)	4 (40)	1 (33)	10 (50)
Average precipitation mm (inches)	150 (5.9)	130 (5.2)	160 (6.3)	130 (5)	120 (4.7)	110 (4.5)	130 (5.3)	99 (3.9)	110 (4.2)	91 (3.6)	120 (4.7)	130 (5.1)	1,480 (58.4)
Source: Weatherbase

== Government ==
The governmental body which oversees Adger is the Jefferson County Commission.

There is a Courthouse (Annex) located in downtown Bessemer with a Probate Office and courtrooms. The main courthouse and most of the county services and offices are located in downtown Birmingham, which is approximately 26 miles (42 km) to the North East.

Adger lies within the boundaries of the "Bessemer Cut-off Area" and law enforcement is managed by the Jefferson County Sheriff's Department.

== Economy ==
Adger is situated in the midst of the iron ore and coal district of Alabama. Coal is still mined in and around Adger by means of underground and strip mining. Steel is manufactured in nearby cities as well. Local mines include Jim Walter #3; Oak Grove Mine; and Shannon Mine.

== Demographics ==
Adger, according to the returns from 1850-2010 for Alabama, has never reported a population figure separately on the U.S. Census as an unincorporated community. However, the area (ZIP code 35006) had a population of 3,109 in the year 2000. The Median Age of its residents was 37.5 yrs with 92.3% White; 6.4% Black; 0.4% Hispanic; 0.9% Other. In 2010, the population within the zip code had increased slightly to 3,121.

== Transportation ==
Several trucking companies are located within the area and the entire county is served by rail and air transportation. Bessemer Airport is just south of here and Birmingham International Airport is approximately 30 miles (48 km) to the Northeast, along I-20/59.

== Education ==
There are no public schools located in Adger. The Oak Grove Schools which were located approximately ten miles north from here until an F5 tornado destroyed them on April 8, 1998. They reopened as separate buildings two years later. It is within easy driving distance of several private schools in this area and approximately 45 minutes from several universities including UAB, located downtown Birmingham, and University of Alabama, located in Tuscaloosa.

== Media ==
Adger has numerous television and radio stations located in and around the cities of Birmingham and Bessemer. Newspapers for the area include the Birmingham News, The Western Star, and The Western Tribune.

== Religion ==
Adger is home to several churches, including Adger Baptist, Adger Church of God, Adger Holiness, and Bible Comes to Life. Most facilities are new or updated and several of the churches combine each year for a Community Revival.

== Points of interest ==
Adger is approximately 6 miles (9.7 km) from WaterMark Outlet Mall and Alabama Adventure (formerly VisionLand). Alabama Adventure has rides, shops, attractions, and a Water Park.

Adger is approximately 10 miles (16 km) from a new state of the art shopping facility located along I-459 between Bessemer and McCalla. The shopping center will host a multiplex theater and several top name retailers.

The Bessemer Civic Center, which hosts many concerts, homeshows, etc. is located at exit 108 along I20/59, and is approximately 7 miles (11 km) from the heart of Adger.
