= Hal Hamburg =

American football halfback

Profile
- Position: Halfback

Career information
- College: Arkansas (1940): Navy (1941–1944)

Harold Hamburg, sometimes known as "Hurlin' Hal", was an American football player.

Hamburg grew up in Lonoke, Arkansas. He played halfback for the University of Arkansas in 1940 and for the United States Naval Academy from 1941 to 1944. Known for his passing, he helped lead the 1943 Navy Midshipmen football team to the Eastern championship and the No. 4 ranking in the final AP poll with an 8–1 record. He finished sixth in the 1943 voting for the Heisman Trophy. At the end of the 1943 season, he was also selected by the Associated Press (AP) and United Press (UP) as a first-team player on the 1943 All-Eastern football team and by the UP as a second-team halfback on the 1943 All-America college football team. At the end of the 1944 season, he was selected by the AP for the second consecutive year as a first-team back on the 1944 All-Eastern football team and was selected as a third-team back by the AP on the 1944 All-America team.

After leaving the Naval Academy, Hamburg was assigned to the Pensalcola Naval Air Station and starred for the 1945 Pensacola Naval Air Station Goslings football team and continued to play for the base team through at least 1947.
