= 1943 Miami Hurricanes football team =

American college football team

1943 Miami Hurricanes football
- Conference: Independent
- Record: 5–1
- Head coach: Eddie Dunn (1st season)
- Home stadium: Burdine Stadium

1943 Southern college football independents records
	Conf.			Overall
Team	W	L	T	W		L		T
No. 4 Navy		–		8	–	1	–	0
Miami (FL)		–		5	–	1	–	0
West Virginia		–		4	–	3	–	0
Howard (AL)		–		2	–	2	–	0
North Texas Aggies		–		3	–	4	–	1
Virginia		–		3	–	4	–	1
Texas Tech		–		4	–	6	–	0
Tennessee Tech		–		1	–	5	–	0
Sewanee		–		0	–	3	–	0
Rankings from AP Poll

The 1943 Miami Hurricanes football team represented the University of Miami as an independent during the 1943 college football season. The Hurricanes played their home games at Burdine Stadium in Miami, Florida. The team was coached by Eddie Dunn, in his first year as interim head coach, while active head coach Jack Harding served in World War II.

In the final Litkenhous Ratings, Miami ranked 64th among the nation's college and service teams with a rating of 76.3.

== Schedule ==
Date	Time	Opponent	Site	Result	Attendance	Source
October 2	2:30 p.m.	at Jacksonville NATTC	Cadet Field; Jacksonville, FL	W 6–0	5,000	
October 15	8:15 p.m.	Camp Gordon	Burdine Stadium; Miami, FL	W 51–6	16,564	
October 23	8:15 p.m.	Charleston Coast Guard	Burdine Stadium; Miami, FL	W 13–6	16,305	
November 5	8:15 p.m.	Jacksonville NATTC	Burdine Stadium; Miami, FL	L 0–20	15,989	
November 20	8:15 p.m.	Presbyterian	Burdine Stadium; Miami, FL	W 32–13	12,000	
November 26	8:15 p.m.	176th Infantry	Burdine Stadium; Miami, FL	W 21–7	11,164	
All times are in Eastern time
