= Miami Hurricanes baseball =

College baseball program

- 2026 Miami Hurricanes baseball team
- Founded: 1940; 86 years ago
- University: University of Miami
- Head coach: J.D. Arteaga (3rd season)
- Conference: ACC; Coastal Division
- Location: Coral Gables, Florida
- Home stadium: Alex Rodriguez Park at Mark Light Field (capacity: 5,000)
- Nickname: Canes
- Colors: Orange, green, and white

College World Series champions
- 1982, 1985, 1999, 2001

College World Series runner-up
- 1974, 1996

College World Series appearances
- 1974, 1978, 1979, 1980, 1981, 1982, 1984, 1985, 1986, 1988, 1989, 1992, 1994, 1995, 1996, 1997, 1998, 1999, 2001, 2003, 2004, 2006, 2008, 2015, 2016

NCAA regional champions
- 1978, 1979, 1980, 1981, 1982, 1984, 1985, 1986, 1988, 1989, 1992, 1994, 1995, 1996, 1997, 1998, 1999, 2000, 2001, 2002, 2003, 2004, 2005, 2006, 2008, 2010, 2015, 2016, 2025

NCAA tournament appearances
- 1971, 1973, 1974, 1975, 1976, 1977, 1978, 1979, 1980, 1981, 1982, 1983, 1984, 1985, 1986, 1987, 1988, 1989, 1990, 1991, 1992, 1993, 1994, 1995, 1996, 1997, 1998, 1999, 2000, 2001, 2002, 2003, 2004, 2005, 2006, 2007, 2008, 2009, 2010, 2011, 2012, 2013, 2014, 2015, 2016, 2019, 2021, 2022, 2023, 2025, 2026

Conference tournament champions
- 2008

Conference regular season champions
- 2008, 2014, 2016

The Miami Hurricanes baseball team is the college baseball program that represents the University of Miami in Coral Gables, Florida. Since 1973, the program has been one of college baseball's elite with 25 College World Series appearances, winning four national championships (1982, 1985, 1999, and 2001) and advancing to the NCAA regionals a record 44 consecutive years, from 1973 to 2016. Miami has won 29 NCAA Regional Titles, hosted 27 NCAA Regionals, and in each of their four national championship runs they were an NCAA Regional Host.

Along with the university's other athletic teams, the baseball team became a member of the Atlantic Coast Conference during the 2004–05 academic year. Previously, the baseball program competed as an NCAA independent, even during the school's Big East Conference affiliation in other sports. Miami won its first ACC conference championship in baseball in the 2008 ACC Baseball Championship. In 2021, College Factual, based on a number of considerations, ranked the University of Miami the best college in the state of Florida for prospective NCAA Division I baseball players.

The Hurricanes play their home games at Alex Rodriguez Park at Mark Light Field on the University of Miami campus in Coral Gables. J.D. Arteaga is currently the head coach of the team.

== History ==
=== Early years (1940-1962) ===
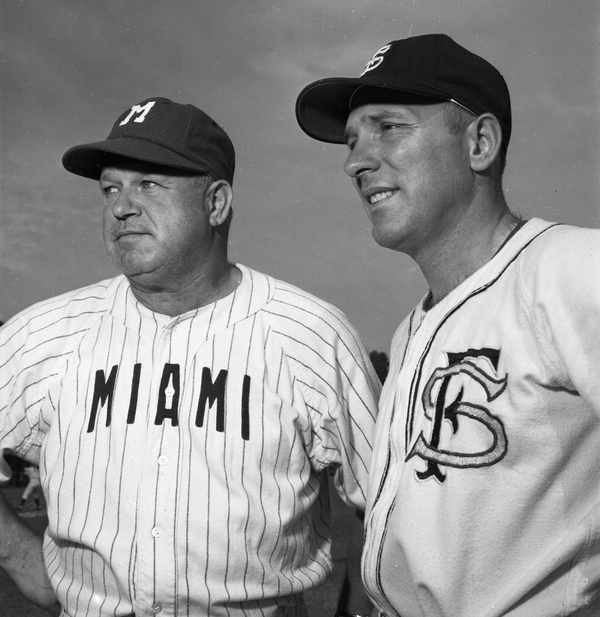
Prior to becoming head coach of the University of Miami baseball team in 1956, Jimmie Foxx (left), played Major League Baseball with the Boston Red Sox, Chicago Cubs, and Philadelphia Phillies. In 1940, he was the second player in Major League Baseball history (after Babe Ruth in 1929) to hit over 500 career home runs.

The University of Miami fielded its first varsity baseball team in the spring of 1940. Jack Harding, the school's head football coach, was charged with the task of putting together the first squad. The program's first game was played on March 3, 1940, at Miami Field, which was located on the southwest corner of the Miami Orange Bowl parking lot. The Hurricanes defeated Newberry, 13–12. The upstart team followed their first victory with 4 straight losses to finish their short, inaugural season with a record of 1–4.

Baseball took a six-year hiatus on the Coral Gables campus until former football standout Eddie Dunn revived the program in 1946. Dunn led the Hurricanes to several winning seasons before leaving the program in 1954.

The relative stability the new program enjoyed under Dunn was followed by several years of coaching upheaval. The Hurricanes would see 4 different coaches in the next 8 seasons. The first of these coaches was Perry Moss, who came to Coral Gables in 1955. Moss led the team to a respectable record of 15–7 in his only season at the university. After leaving Miami, Moss would gain notoriety as a football coach in the NFL, CFL, AFL and the now defunct WFL and USFL.

Moss was succeeded as head coach by MLB superstar Jimmie Foxx. Foxx was inducted into the Professional Baseball Hall of Fame in 1951 after a stellar career that included stops with the Athletics, Red Sox, Cubs and Phillies. His success as a player, however, did not translate to wins for the Hurricane ballclub. Foxx coached two seasons at Miami compiling a record of 20–20.

In 1958, Whitey Campbell became the first former Hurricane player to assume the role of head coach. Campbell lettered in football, baseball and basketball as a student at the University of Miami in the 1940s. With the exception of the 1959 season, in which former coach and athletic director Jack Harding led the team, Campbell was the skipper of the Hurricanes through the spring of 1962. Campbell's teams never had a losing season in his four years as coach.

=== Ron Fraser era (1963-1992) ===
Ron Fraser arrived at the University of Miami in the fall of 1962 after spending three years as head coach of the Dutch National team. What was supposed to be a short three-month stint with the team turned into a successful run that included three European Championships.

The task of turning the Hurricanes into a winner on the diamond was a daunting one. Coach Fraser encountered a program with no money, no uniforms, and no scholarships. He also had to work days at the Coral Gables youth center to supplement his meager pay check from the university.

Ron Fraser's first game as skipper was a 4–3, extra inning loss to Ohio State on March 16, 1963. His first win came five days later as the Hurricanes defeated Army, 3–1. The team finished the year with a record of 18–9.

In their first seven seasons under the tutelage of Coach Fraser, the Hurricanes set school records for wins in 1964 (20), 1965 (23), 1968 (27) and 1969 (31). The program advanced to the postseason for the first time in 1971 when they competed in District III in Gastonia, North Carolina. The Hurricanes won their first game against Georgia Tech, 4–3 before losing to Mississippi State and then being eliminated by Georgia Tech, 5–3.

Following another winning season in 1972, the baseball team received scholarships for the first time. The team had six scholarships in 1973 which resulted in the program's first 40-win season in school history. The next season Fraser was awarded six more scholarships which propelled his team to their first College World Series. They advanced all the way to the championship game, losing to USC 7–3.

==== Mark Light Field at Alex Rodriguez Park ====
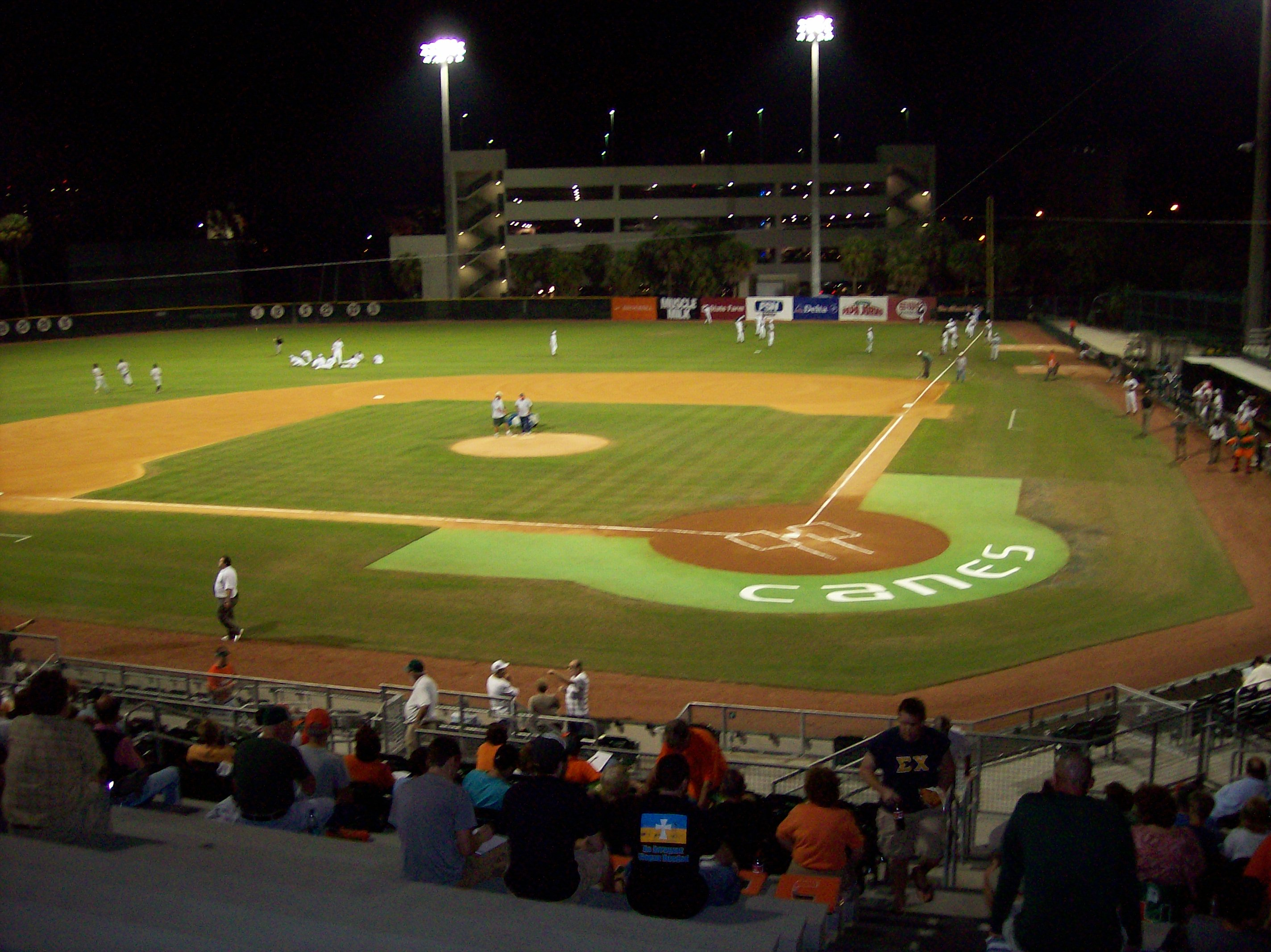
Alex Rodriguez Park at Mark Light Field, the home field for Miami Hurricanes baseball, on the campus of the University of Miami, 2007

In 1971, Fraser's dream of building an elite on campus stadium began to take shape. George and Ethel Light came forward to support the project by making the initial donation to the stadium fund. Opening night for the brand new stadium came on February 16, 1973. A crowd of 4,235 watched as the Hurricanes defeated Florida State, 5–1. The Hurricanes thrilled the overflow crowd by executing a rare triple play in the win over the Seminoles.

George and Ethel Light made a second donation in 1974, which was matched by other donors, in an effort to build permanent concrete seating at the new facility. The stadium was dedicated in 1977 and named for Light's son, Mark, who died of muscular dystrophy. George Light did not get to see the dedication of the stadium named for his son. He died in 1974 shortly after he and his wife made their second donation.

As the program improved, the crowds began to grow. The Hurricanes set single season attendance records in nine of the stadium's first 10 seasons. In 1973, the program averaged 848 fans a game. By 1982 average attendance had skyrocketed to 3,217. Miami led the NCAA in average attendance for 5 straight seasons beginning in 1981.

In 2003, New York Yankees third baseman Alex Rodriguez donated $3.9 million for stadium renovations. The stadium is now named in his honor. His donation, the largest ever to the Hurricanes' baseball program, aided in the building of a new clubhouse, weight room, training room, team meeting room, academic center, video room, press box and four VIP luxury suites. Other improvements in recent years included new dugouts and improved stadium lighting, restrooms and concession areas.

==== 1982 national championship ====
The Hurricanes came close to winning the national championship in their first College World Series appearance in 1974. They followed up with 4 straight appearances from 1978 to 1981 before sweeping through the Atlantic Regional in Coral Gables en route to Omaha in 1982.

Miami opened the College World Series with a 7–2 win over Maine. The Hurricanes followed up with a close-fought 2–1 victory over Texas. Miami's third game in Omaha had perhaps the most memorable play in the history of college baseball.

In what would come to be called the Grand Illusion, the Hurricanes used a hidden ball trick to pick off NCAA stolen base leader Phil Stephenson. In the 6th inning against powerhouse Wichita State, Stephenson took his usual lead from 1st base. Hurricanes pitcher Mike Kasprzak faked a throw to the bag. First baseman Steve Lusby dove to the ground then raced down towards the Hurricane bullpen where pitchers Dan Smith and Bob Walker leaped to avoid the ball. Stephenson set out for 2nd base as Kasprzak tossed the ball over to shortstop Bill Wrona for the tag. The Hurricanes swung the momentum in their favor and went on to win 4–3.

In the semifinal two days later against Maine, Miami pitcher Rob Souza threw a pickoff attempt over the head of Bill Wrona into center field. But the memory of the Grand Illusion kept the runner from trying to advance to third. Maine head coach John Winkin said, "I thought it was another trick play." Miami rolled to a 10–4 victory that propelled them into the championship game against Wichita State.

In the championship game, Wichita State jumped out to an early 3–0 lead. In the top of the 5th, the Hurricanes scored 6 runs with the aid of a Phil Lane 3-run home run. Miami added a run in the 6th and 2 runs in the 8th before closer Dan Smith finished off the Shockers in the 9th for the Hurricanes first national championship. Smith was named College World Series MVP while Lane and catcher Nelson Santovenia were named to the all tournament team.

==== 1985 national championship ====
Miami was unable to reach Omaha to defend their championship in 1983. However, the Hurricanes reached the College World Series again in 1984 before bowing out after losses to Arizona State and Cal State Fullerton.

The Hurricanes reached the 1985 College World Series by beating Florida, 12–9 in the final game of the Atlantic Regional. Miami began play in Omaha by thumping Stanford, 17–3 before losing to Texas, 8–4 in game 2. The loss to Texas put the Hurricanes in the losers bracket. The Hurricanes responded by pulling off three straight one run victories over Oklahoma State, Mississippi State and Texas. The win over Texas forced a winner take all championship game between the Hurricanes and the Longhorns.

In a game delayed a full day by inclement weather, the Hurricanes jumped out to an early 2–0 lead and never trailed the rest of the way. Miami closer Rick Raether pitched the final 2.1 innings to finish off the Longhorns, 10–6, and give the Hurricanes their second national championship. Designated hitter Greg Ellena was named College World Series MVP while catcher Chris Magno and pitcher Kevin Sheary were named to the all tournament team.

==== Retirement and legacy ====
Ron Fraser led the Hurricanes to Omaha four more times before his retirement at the end of the 1992 season. In all, coach Fraser won 1,271 games while leading his team to the College World Series 12 times. He made the postseason 21 times in his 30 years as head coach and his teams never had a losing record during his tenure.

Coach Fraser was known as the Wizard of College Baseball due to his creative and innovative promotions geared towards generating interest in the college game. Major League Baseball stars such as Stan Musial and Ted Williams headlined several events to help raise money for Fraser's program. In one instance, Fraser ventured to Bristol, Connecticut, to promote college baseball to the brass at ESPN. His efforts paid off as the sports television network broadcast several high-profile college baseball games on national television.

In 2006, Ron Fraser was inducted into the inaugural class of the College Baseball Hall of Fame in Lubbock, Texas.

=== Jim Morris era (1994-2018) ===
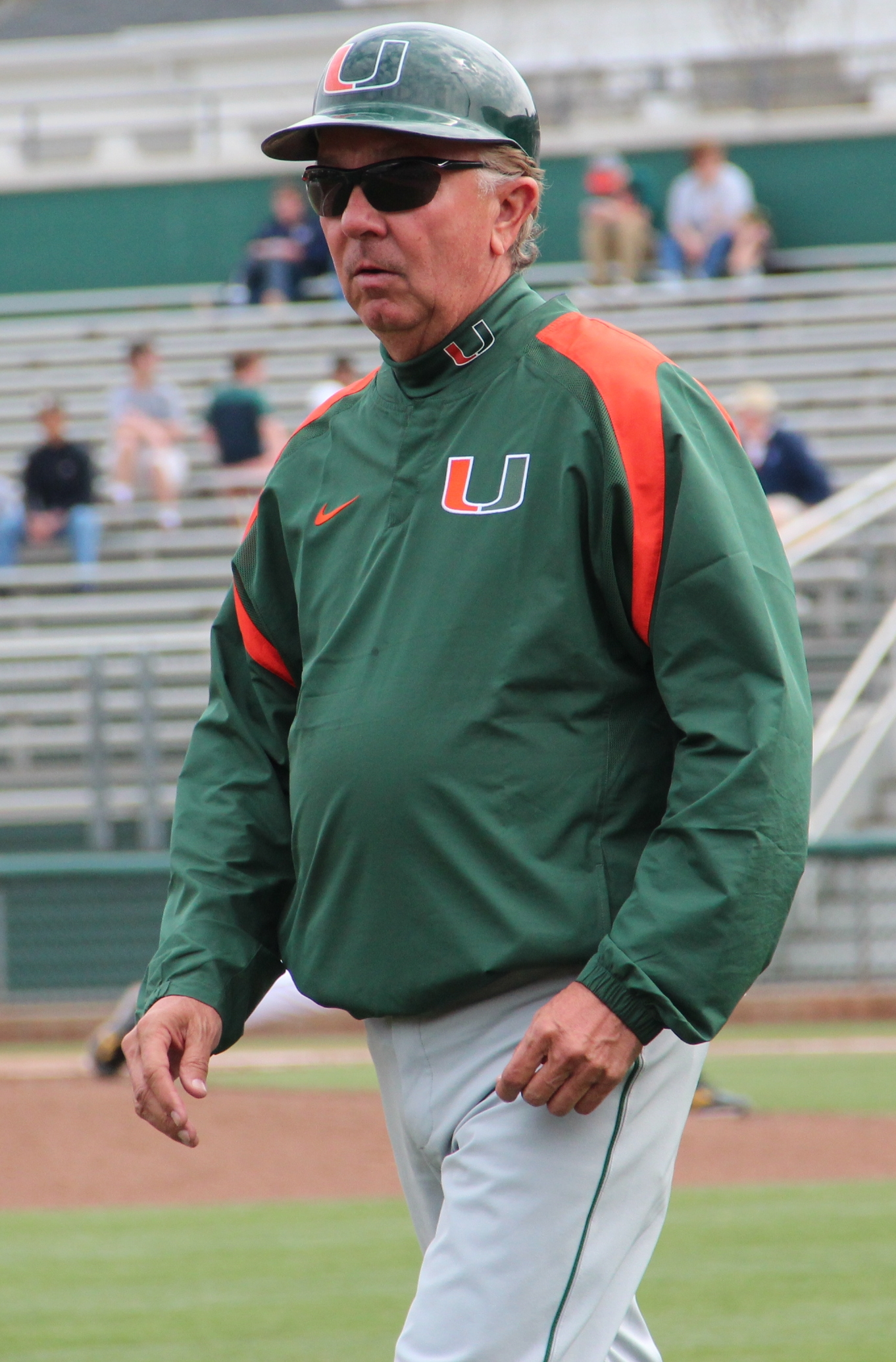
Jim Morris, head coach of the Miami Hurricanes baseball team from 1994 to 2018, led the University of Miami to two College World Series championships in 1999 and 2001.

University of Miami athletic director Dave Maggard hired longtime assistant Brad Kelley to replace Ron Fraser. But after a subpar season and allegations that Kelley allowed under age drinking among his players on a road trip, he resigned. The new athletic director, Paul Dee, opened up a national search for his replacement. Among the finalists for the job were Long Beach State head coach Dave Snow, North Carolina State head coach Ray Tanner and Georgia Tech head coach Jim Morris.

On November 4, 1993, Morris was named head coach of the Miami Hurricanes. In 12 seasons at Georgia Tech, Morris won 504 games and 4 straight ACC Championships. However, he never led the Yellow Jackets to a College World Series. In his 23-season reign as head coach with the Hurricanes, he has won over 1,000 games, led his team to the College World Series 13 times, won three ACC regular season titles, the 2008 ACC tournament title, four Coastal Division titles, and most importantly has won two College World Series championships.

=== Gino DiMare era (2019-2023) ===
Gino DiMare, who played college baseball under Ron Fraser at the University of Miami from 1989 to 1992, was hired as the University of Miami's baseball team in 2019. He had been named the head-coach-in-waiting by Morris in 2014. On two separate occasions prior to 2019 (1997 until 2008) and (2012 until 2018), DiMare served as an assistant head coach for the University of Miami baseball team.

In his three seasons as head coach, DiMare accumulated a record of 86 wins and 45 losses. In the 2023 season, the Hurricanes were eliminated in the first round of the Regional Division I tournament. Four days later, on June 8, 2023, DiMare announced his resignation.

=== J. D. Arteaga era (2024-present) ===
On June 26, 2023, longtime Hurricanes associate head coach J. D. Arteaga was named the new head coach of the program.

== Head coaches ==
Tenure	Coach	Years	Record	Pct.
1940, 1959	Jack Harding	2	16–14–1	.532
1946–1954	Eddie Dunn	9	82–73–2	.529
1955	Perry Moss	1	15–7–0	.682
1956–1957	Jimmie Foxx	2	20–20–0	.500
1958, 1960–1962	Whitey Campbell	4	69–36–3	.653
1963–1992	Ron Fraser	30	1,271–438–9	.742
1993	Brad Kelley	1	36–22–0	.621
1994–2018	Jim Morris	25	1,090–472–3	.697
2019–2023	Gino DiMare	5	168–86	.661
2024–present	J. D. Arteaga	1	27–30	.474
Totals	10 coaches	80 seasons	2,792–1,226–18	.694

== Championships ==
=== National championships ===
Year	Coach	Record	Result
1982	Ron Fraser	55–17–1	Beat Wichita State, 9–3
1985	Ron Fraser	64–16–0	Beat Texas, 10–6
1999	Jim Morris	50–13–0	Beat Florida State, 6–5
2001	Jim Morris	53–12–0	Beat Stanford, 12–1

=== Conference Regular Season Championships ===
Year	Conference	Coach	Record
2008	ACC	Jim Morris	23-5
2014	ACC	Jim Morris	24-6
2016	ACC	Jim Morris	21-7

=== Conference Tournament Championships ===
Year	Conference	Coach	Result
2008	ACC	Jim Morris	Beat Virginia, 8-4

=== Conference Division Championships ===
Year	Conference	Division	Coach	Record
2008	ACC	Coastal	Jim Morris	23-5
2014	ACC	Coastal	Jim Morris	24-6
2015	ACC	Coastal	Jim Morris	22-8
2016	ACC	Coastal	Jim Morris	21-7

== Honors and awards ==
=== National awards ===
The Golden Spikes Award is given annually to the best amateur baseball player in the United States. The award, created by USA Baseball and sponsored by the MLBPA, was first presented in 1978 and is considered the most prestigious in amateur baseball.

Golden Spikes Award
Year	Player	Position
1998	Pat Burrell	3B

The Dick Howser Trophy is given annually to the college baseball player of the year. The award was first presented in 1987 and is named after former Major League Baseball player and manager Dick Howser.

Dick Howser Trophy
Year	Player	Position
1987	Mike Fiore	OF

The Johnny Bench Award was created in 2000 to honor college baseball's top Catcher. The award is administered by the Greater Wichita Area Sports Commission and is named after former Major League Baseball player Johnny Bench.

Johnny Bench Award
Year	Player	Position
2016	Zack Collins	C

The Stopper of the Year Award was created in 2005 to honor college baseball's top relief pitcher. The award is administered and voted on by the National Collegiate Baseball Writers Association.

Stopper of the Year Award
Year	Player	Position
2016	Bryan Garcia	RP

=== Conference awards ===
The ACC Player of the Year is an award given to the Atlantic Coast Conference's most outstanding player. The award was first given following the 1969 season.

ACC Player of the Year
Year	Player	Position
2005	Ryan Braun	3B
2010	Yasmani Grandal	C

The ACC Pitcher of the Year is an award given to the Atlantic Coast Conference's most outstanding pitcher. The award was first given following the 2005 season.

ACC Pitcher of the Year
Year	Player	Position
2005	Cesar Carrillo	SP
2014	Chris Diaz	SP

The ACC Coach of the Year is an award given to the Atlantic Coast Conference's most outstanding coach. The award was first given following the 1981 season.

ACC Coach of the Year
Year	Coach
2008	Jim Morris

=== College Baseball Hall of Fame ===
The College Baseball Hall of Fame is operated by the College Baseball Foundation and was founded in 2006. The museum is located in Lubbock, Texas, and serves as the central point for the study of the history of college baseball in the United States.

Year	Player	Position
2006	Ron Fraser	Head Coach
2008	Neal Heaton	SP
2014	Alex Fernandez	SP
2014	Mike Fiore	OF

== See also ==
- List of NCAA Division I baseball programs
- Sports in Miami
