= Oak Grove High School (Jefferson County, Alabama) =

Coordinates: 33°28′10.88″N 87°9′35.31″W

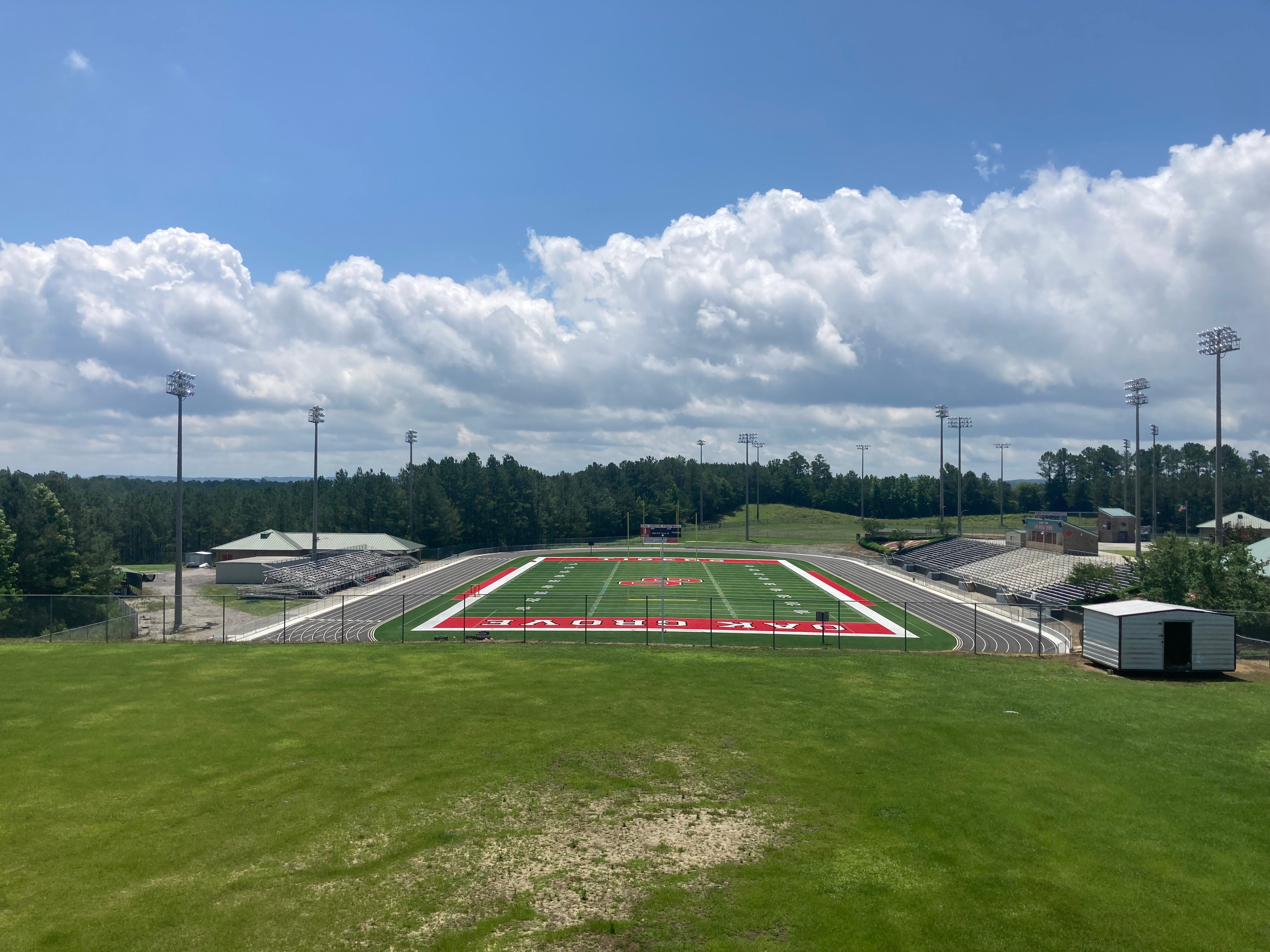

Location
- 9494 Oak Grove Parkway; Bessemer, Alabama 35023; United States

Information
- Type: Public
- Established: 1916 (110 years ago)
- School board: Jefferson County Schools
- CEEB code: 010320
- Principal: Steven Ray
- Teaching staff: 41.00 (FTE)
- Grades: 6-12
- Enrollment: 732 (2023–2024)
- Student to teacher ratio: 17.85
- Campus: Suburban
- Colors: Red and white
- Athletics: AHSAA Class 4A
- Nickname: Tigers
- Feeder schools: Oak Grove Elementary School, West Jefferson Elementary School
- Website: www.jefcoed.com/o/oakgrovehs

Oak Grove High School is a combined middle school and high school. Its location is fifteen miles northwest of downtown Bessemer, a suburb of Birmingham, Alabama. It is physically located in the unincorporated community of Oak Grove for which the school is named. Oak Grove is one of fourteen high schools in the Jefferson County School System. School colors are red and white, and the athletic teams are called the Tigers. Oak Grove competes in AHSAA Class 4A athletics.

== 1998 Tornado & campus reconstruction ==
An F5 tornado struck several communities of Jefferson County just before eight o'clock in the evening on April 8, 1998, with some of the most serious destruction in the Oak Grove community. The tornado resulted in more than 25 fatalities and destroyed numerous homes and businesses and destroyed the original Oak Grove High School on Lock 17 Road. The school, which at that point served grades K-12, was damaged beyond repair with the elementary school portion destroyed.

During the two years it took to construct the new school, students were relocated more than sixteen miles away to the campus of Gilmore-Bell Vocational School in Bessemer. The elementary and middle school grades were relocated to the old McAdory Elementary School in McCalla, which was more than twenty miles away. When the school was rebuilt, the County School Board made the decision to construct a separate campus for the elementary school grades. Oak Grove Elementary School is located across the road from the new high school on Tiger Cub Trail.

== Performing arts ==
On September 1, 1959, Oak Grove High School organized their first school band, with thirty-nine inaugural members. The band program currently consists of both marching and concert ensembles, along with an indoor drumline, indoor winter guard, and jazz band.

The band has been invited to several nationally recognized parades, performing in the Rose Parade in 1988, the Macy's Thanksgiving Day Parade in 1992, the New York St. Patrick's Day Parade in 2016, the Fiesta Flambeau Parade in 2023, and the Shandoah Apple Blossom Parade in 2025. Additionally, the band program has been competitively successfully across multiple performing ensembles and competitive circuits.

Alabama Marching Band Championships

- 4A State Champions: 2018, 2019, 2021, 2022, 2023, 2024 , 2025

Bands of America

- Regional Finalist: 2023, 2024

Southeastern Color Guard Circuit

- Winter Guard
  - Cadet Class Alabama State Champions: 2022, 2025
  - SRA Class Alabama State Champions: 2018, 2021, 2022
  - SAAA Class Alabama State Champions: 2025
- Indoor Drumline
  - PSA Class Alabama State Champions: 2012, 2016, 2018, 2025
  - PIA Class Alabama State Champions: 2014
- Indoor Winds
  - WSA Class Alabama State Champions: 2016, 2018

Alabama Bandmasters Association

- Music Performance Assessment - Superior Rating: 1979, 1982, 1984, 2003, 2006, 2007, 2008, 2009, 2010, 2011, 2012, 2013, 2014, 2018, 2023, 2024, 2025

== Athletics ==
Oak Grove competes in AHSAA Class 4A athletics and fields teams in the following sports: (updated to 2017-2018 school year)

- Baseball
- Boys Basketball
- Girls Basketball
- Bowling
- Cheerleading
- Boys Cross Country
- Girls Cross Country
- Football
- Boys Golf
- Girls Golf
- Boys Outdoor Track & Field
- Girls Outdoor Track & Field
- Softball
- Boys and Girls Tennis
- Volleyball
- Wrestling

== Oak Grove football ==
Oak Grove has 5 region championships and 1 state championship. Its first team was started back in 1922. Oak Grove has an overall record of 359-529-27 (.407). Their first playoff appearance was in 1973. Since then, they have made the playoffs 15 times, with the latest appearance occurring in 2024. Their playoff record is 8-15. The Oak Grove team made nine appearances in the "Dental Clinic Classic," a football game played annually between 1948-1995 for the "Jefferson County Championship." Their record was 3-6 in those games winning for the first time in 1973 defeating Pleasant Grove High School by a score of 41-0. They also won the game in 1981 and 1983 defeating Corner and Warrior respectively.

== Notable alumni ==
- Euil "Snitz" Snider, U.S. Olympic Sprinter (1928 Games in Amsterdam), Alabama Sports Hall of Fame, Class of 1975 and Head Football Coach at Bessemer High School from 1933-1963 compiling record of 157-69-12
- John R. Vines, Lieutenant General, U.S. Army (Retired) was Commander, U.S. Army XVIII Airborne Corps & Multi-National Corps-Iraq
