= 1943 West Virginia Mountaineers football team =

American college football season

1943 West Virginia Mountaineers football
- Conference: Independent
- Record: 4–3
- Head coach: Ira Rodgers (7th season)
- Captain: Robert Dutton
- Home stadium: Mountaineer Field

1943 Southern college football independents records
	Conf.			Overall
Team	W	L	T	W		L		T
No. 4 Navy		–		8	–	1	–	0
Miami (FL)		–		5	–	1	–	0
West Virginia		–		4	–	3	–	0
Howard (AL)		–		2	–	2	–	0
North Texas Aggies		–		3	–	4	–	1
Virginia		–		3	–	4	–	1
Texas Tech		–		4	–	6	–	0
Tennessee Tech		–		1	–	5	–	0
Sewanee		–		0	–	3	–	0
Rankings from AP Poll

The 1943 West Virginia Mountaineers football team was an American football team that represented West Virginia University as an independent during the 1943 college football season. In its seventh non-consecutive season under head coach Ira Rodgers, the team compiled a 4–3 record and outscored opponents by a total of 124 to 79. Robert Dutton was the team captain. The team played home games at Mountaineer Field in Morgantown, West Virginia.

In the final Litkenhous Ratings, West Virginia ranked 108th among the nation's college and service teams with a rating of 64.2.

== Schedule ==
Date	Opponent	Site	Result	Attendance	Source
October 2	vs. Virginia	Laidley Field; Charleston, WV	L 0–6		
October 9	at Pittsburgh	Pitt Stadium; Pittsburgh, PA (rivalry)	L 0–20	12,000–15,000	
October 16	Maryland	Mountaineer Field; Morgantown, WV (rivalry)	W 6–2		
October 23	Carnegie Tech^{†}	Mountaineer Field; Morgantown, WV	W 32–0	6,176	
October 30	at Penn State	New Beaver Field; State College, PA (rivalry)	L 7–32	4,494	
November 6	at Lehigh	Taylor Stadium; Bethlehem, PA	W 53–6		
November 13	Bethany (WV)	Mountaineer Field; Morgantown, WV	W 26–13	3,164	
^{†}Homecoming
