= 1943 Texas Tech Red Raiders football team =

American college football season

1943 Texas Tech Red Raiders football
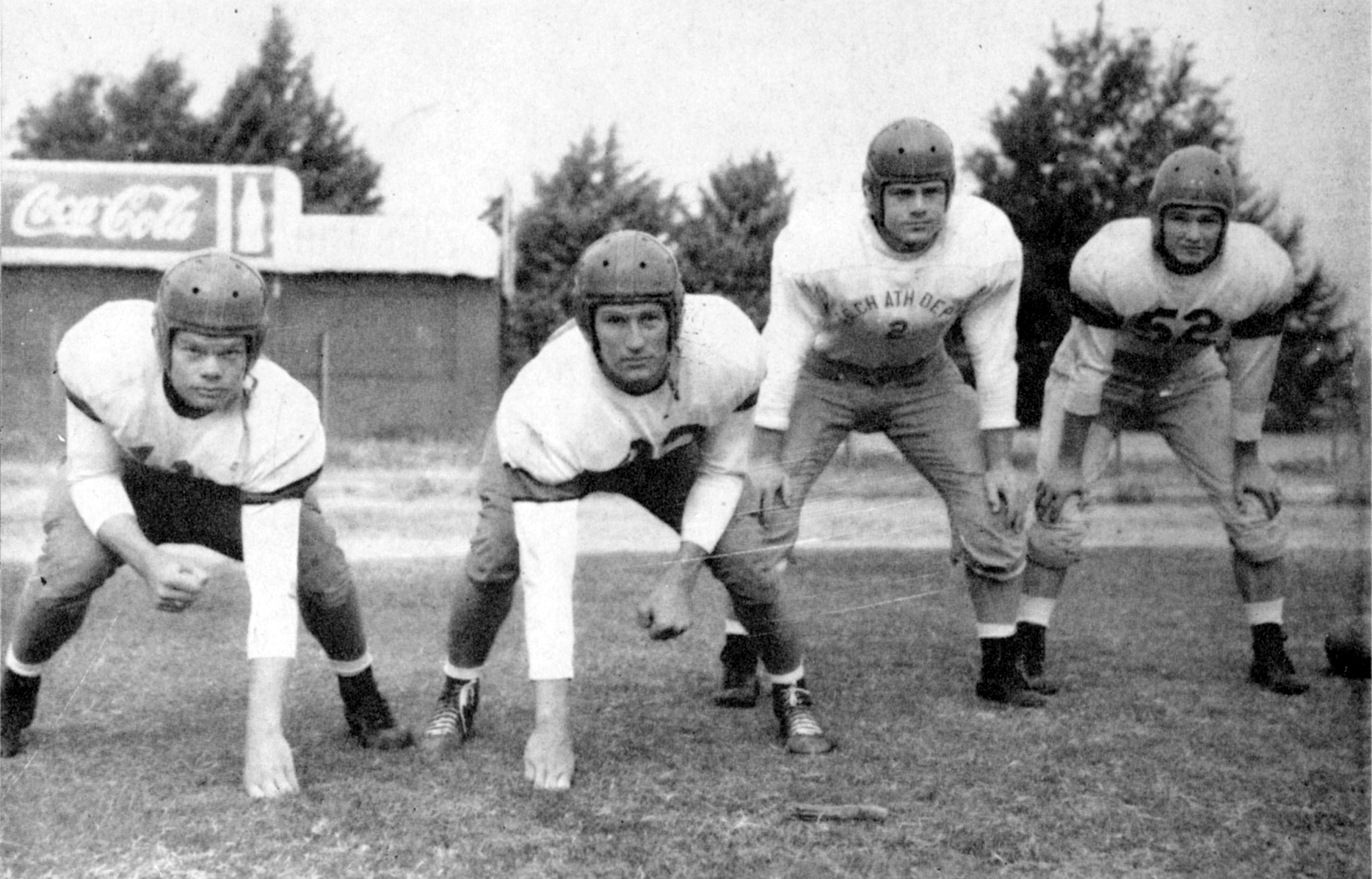
- A group from the 1943 Texas Tech football team
- Conference: Independent
- Record: 4–6
- Head coach: Dell Morgan (3rd season)
- Offensive scheme: Single-wing
- Base defense: 6–2
- Home stadium: Tech Field

1943 Southern college football independents records
	Conf.			Overall
Team	W	L	T	W		L		T
No. 4 Navy		–		8	–	1	–	0
Miami (FL)		–		5	–	1	–	0
West Virginia		–		4	–	3	–	0
Howard (AL)		–		2	–	2	–	0
North Texas Aggies		–		3	–	4	–	1
Virginia		–		3	–	4	–	1
Texas Tech		–		4	–	6	–	0
Tennessee Tech		–		1	–	5	–	0
Sewanee		–		0	–	3	–	0
Rankings from AP Poll

The 1943 Texas Tech Red Raiders football team represented Texas Technological College (now known as Texas Tech University) as an independent during the 1943 college football season. Led third-year head coach Dell Morgan, the Red Raiders compiled a record of 4–6.

In the final Litkenhous Ratings, Texas Tech ranked 94th among the nation's college and service teams with a rating of 67.4.

The team played home games at Tech Field in Lubbock, Texas.

== Schedule ==
Date	Time	Opponent	Site	Result	Attendance	Source
September 18	8:15 p.m.	Lubbock AAF	Tech Field; Lubbock, TX	W 26–14	8,000	
September 24	8:15 p.m.	vs. Oklahoma A&M	Taft Stadium; Oklahoma City, OK	L 13–21	7,000	
October 2		vs. Texas A&M	Alamo Stadium; San Antonio, TX (rivalry)	L 0–13	25,000	
October 9		at Tulsa	Skelly Field; Tulsa, OK	L 7–34	13,000	
October 16	8:15 p.m.	South Plains AAF	Tech Field; Lubbock, TX	W 14–12	6,000	
October 23	8:15 p.m.	Lubbock AAF	Tech Field; Lubbock, TX	L 7–10		
October 30		at Rice	Rice Field; Houston, TX	L 0–13	5,000	
November 6		at TCU	Amon G. Carter Stadium; Fort Worth, TX (rivalry)	W 40–20	3,000	
November 13		North Texas Aggies^{†}	Tech Field; Lubbock, TX	L 14–34	3,600	
November 20		at SMU	Ownby Stadium; University Park, TX	W 7–6	3,000	
^{†}Homecoming; All times are in Central time
