= Redmont Garden Apartments =

- U.S. National Register of Historic Places
- Location within Alabama
- Location: 2829 Thornhill Road, Mountain Brook, Alabama
- Coordinates: 33°29′43″N 86°46′46″W
- Area: 8 acres (3.2 ha)
- Built: 1938
- Architect: Raymond C. Snow
- Architectural style: Colonial Revival
- NRHP reference No.: 93000761
- Added to NRHP: August 5, 1993

The Redmont Garden Apartments is a historic complex of four buildings in Mountain Brook, Alabama. It was built by the B. L. Jackson Company with a mortgage from the New York Life Insurance Company supported by the Federal Housing Administration. Construction began in 1938, and it was completed in 1939.

The buildings were designed by architect Raymond C. Snow in the Colonial Revival style. It has been listed on the National Register of Historic Places since August 5, 1993.
