= Quintayvious Hutchins =

American football player (born 2003)

No. 45 – New England Patriots
- Position: Outside linebacker
- Roster status: Injured reserve

Personal information
- Born: April 2, 2003 (age 23)
- Listed height: 6 ft 3 in (1.91 m)
- Listed weight: 245 lb (111 kg)

Career information
- High school: Bessemer City (Bessemer, Alabama)
- College: Boston College (2021–2025)
- NFL draft: 2026: 7th round, 247th overall pick

Career history
- New England Patriots (2026–present)
- Stats at Pro Football Reference

Quintayvious Hutchins (born April 2, 2003) is an American professional football outside linebacker for the New England Patriots of the National Football League (NFL). He played college football for the Boston College Eagles and was selected by the Patriots in the seventh round of the 2026 NFL draft.

== Early life ==
Hutchins attended Bessemer City High School located in Bessemer, Alabama. Coming out of high school, he committed to play college football for the Boston College Eagles.

== College career ==
In Week 9 of the 2024 season, Hutchins totaled four tackles, a forced fumble, a fumble recovery, and an interception in a loss to Louisville. He finished his first season a starter in 2024 with 31 tackles with five and a half being for a loss, three and a half sacks, two fumble recoveries, a forced fumble, and an interception. Hutchins entered the 2025 season as the top defender and leader of the Eagles defense after Donovan Ezeiruaku graduated. That season, he put up 35 tackles with three and a half going for a loss, and two sacks. After the conclusion of the 2025 season, Hutchins declared for the 2026 NFL draft, while accepting an invite to the 2026 Senior Bowl. He also accepted an invite to participate in the NFL scouting combine and Boston College Pro Day.

== Professional career ==
Pre-draft measurables
Height	Weight	Arm length	Hand span	Wingspan	40-yard dash	10-yard split	20-yard split	20-yard shuttle	Three-cone drill	Vertical jump	Broad jump
6 ft 2 7/8 in (1.90 m)	233 lb (106 kg)	32 5/8 in (0.83 m)	9 1/2 in (0.24 m)	6 ft 9 1/8 in (2.06 m)	4.74 s	1.73 s	2.76 s	4.61 s	7.34 s	37.0 in (0.94 m)	9 ft 4 in (2.84 m)
All values from NFL Combine/Pro Day

Hutchins was selected by the New England Patriots in the seventh round with the 247th overall pick of the 2026 NFL draft.

== Personal life ==
On May 13, 2026, Hutchins was charged with misdemeanor domestic assault and battery on a family/household member; the charges stemmed from an incident that occurred in a Boston College dorm the previous day.
