= Bub Walker =

American football player and coach (1907–1963)

Biographical details
- Born: October 23, 1907; Ensley, Alabama, U.S.
- Died: December 31, 1963 (aged 56); Miami, Florida, U.S.
- Education: University of Alabama

Playing career
- 1931–1933: Alabama
- Position: Halfback

Coaching career (HC unless noted)
- 1944–1945: Howard (AL)

Administrative career (AD unless noted)
- 1944–1945: Howard (AL)

Head coaching record
- Overall: 0–10

Erskine Ramsay "Bub" Walker (October 23, 1907 – December 31, 1963) was an American college football player and coach. He served as the head football coach at Samford University–then known as Howard College–from 1944 to 1945, compiling a record of 0–10. Walker played college football at the University of Alabama from 1931 to 1933 as a halfback.

Walker played high school football in 1924 and 1925 at Ensley High School in Birmingham, Alabama before attending Marion Military Institute in Marion, Alabama. He was the brother of Peahead Walker, who was also a football coach. Walker died at the age of 56, on December 31, 1963, in Miami.

== Head coaching record ==
Year	Team	Overall	Conference	Standing	Bowl/playoffs
Howard Seadogs (Independent) (1944–1945)
1944	Howard	0–5			
1945	Howard	0–5			
Howard:		0–10			
Total:		0–10			
