= Darryl Williams (center) =

American football player (born 1997)

Profile
- Position: Center

Personal information
- Born: June 10, 1997 (age 29); Bessemer, Alabama, U.S.
- Listed height: 6 ft 2 in (1.88 m)
- Listed weight: 304 lb (138 kg)

Career information
- High school: Bessemer City (AL)
- College: Mississippi State (2015–2019)
- NFL draft: 2020: undrafted

Career history
- Kansas City Chiefs (2020–2022)*; New England Patriots (2022)*; Jacksonville Jaguars (2022–2023)
- * Offseason or practice squad member only

Career NFL statistics as of 2023
- Games played: 1
- Stats at Pro Football Reference

Darryl Williams Jr. (born June 10, 1997) is an American professional football center. He played college football for the Mississippi State Bulldogs and was signed by the Kansas City Chiefs as an undrafted free agent in 2020. He has also spent time with the New England Patriots.

== Early life and college ==
Williams was born on June 10, 1997, in Bessemer, Alabama. He attended Bessemer City High School there and played football as a lineman. He was a four-star prospect and was ranked as the tenth-best player in the state by ESPN. He also placed 13th on the 247Sports list of top prospects, 14th on the list made by Scout.com, and 21st on the list made by Rivals.com. At the end of his senior year, Williams was invited to the Alabama-Mississippi All-Star Classic.

Williams announced his commitment to Mississippi State in October 2014, and spent his true freshman year (2015) as a redshirt. As a redshirt-freshman in 2016, he appeared in the first seven games of the season, mainly on special teams, before suffering a season-ending neck injury. He appeared on a total of 32 snaps that year.

Williams became a starter as a sophomore in 2017, appearing in all 13 games. He was named once the Lineman of the Week in the Southeastern Conference (SEC) and was graded out higher than any other Mississippi State lineman on the season. He helped Mississippi State allow the fewest sacks (13) in the conference and the fifth-lowest total in the nation.

In the 2018 season, Williams' junior year, he started 12 games as the team's main left guard. He appeared on a total of 676 snaps and only missed one game, Auburn, due to injury. Pro Football Focus graded him the fifth-best guard overall in the conference and he was given the fifth-best pass-blocking grade (82.9). Williams only allowed a single sack in the season, and helped the team place second in the conference for yards per rush (5.7) and rushing yards per game (223.6).

Williams was named team captain for his senior year, 2019, and started every game (13) at the center position. He played the second-most snaps on the team and only allowed one sack on 365 pass plays. He helped the school place third in the conference for rushing yards per game, second in average yards per rush, and fifth in rushing touchdowns. He was named SEC Lineman of the Week against Southern Miss.

Williams graduated in December 2019 with a degree in family sciences and human development. He finished his college career with 45 games played, 38 as a starter, in four seasons played in. According to Pro Football Focus, he allowed only two sacks in his career and played on a total of 2,246 snaps. His biography at the Mississippi State website stated that he was "[a]n elite, versatile offensive lineman who was an unquestioned team leader during his career."

== Professional career ==
Pre-draft measurables
Height	Weight	Arm length	Hand span	40-yard dash	10-yard split	20-yard split	20-yard shuttle	Three-cone drill	Vertical jump	Broad jump	Bench press
6 ft 2 3/8 in (1.89 m)	304 lb (138 kg)	32 1/8 in (0.82 m)	9 3/4 in (0.25 m)	5.23 s	1.80 s	3.01 s	4.76 s	7.88 s	25.5 in (0.65 m)	8 ft 6 in (2.59 m)	23 reps
All values from NFL Combine

=== Kansas City Chiefs ===
After going unselected in the 2020 NFL draft, Williams was signed by the Kansas City Chiefs as an undrafted free agent. He was waived at the final roster cuts, on September 5, but was re-signed to the practice squad the following day. He was released from the practice squad on January 14, 2021, and was re-signed on January 27, during the playoffs. Williams was signed to a future contract on February 9. He was placed on the reserve/COVID-19 list on August 7, and was activated three days later.

Williams was waived at the final roster cuts again in 2021, on August 31 of that year, and was subsequently signed to the practice squad. He was released on October 19, but was later brought back on November 9. On February 2, 2022, he was signed to a future contract. He was released on June 14.

=== New England Patriots ===
On June 21, 2022, Williams was signed by the New England Patriots. He was later released on July 26.

=== Jacksonville Jaguars ===
Williams was signed by the Jacksonville Jaguars four days after being cut by New England. He was waived at the final roster cuts, on August 30, and afterwards was re-signed to the practice squad. He was elevated to the active roster for their week four game against the Philadelphia Eagles, and made his debut in the 29–21 loss, appearing on three special teams snaps. He signed a reserve/future contract on January 23, 2023.

On August 29, 2023, Williams was waived by the Jaguars and re-signed to the practice squad. He signed a reserve/future contract on January 8, 2024.

On August 27, 2024, Williams was waived by the Jaguars.
