= 1943 North Texas Aggies football team =

American college football season

1943 North Texas Aggies football
- Conference: Independent
- Record: 3–4–1
- Head coach: Klepto Holmes (9th season)

1943 Southern college football independents records
	Conf.			Overall
Team	W	L	T	W		L		T
No. 4 Navy		–		8	–	1	–	0
Miami (FL)		–		5	–	1	–	0
West Virginia		–		4	–	3	–	0
Howard (AL)		–		2	–	2	–	0
North Texas Aggies		–		3	–	4	–	1
Virginia		–		3	–	4	–	1
Texas Tech		–		4	–	6	–	0
Tennessee Tech		–		1	–	5	–	0
Sewanee		–		0	–	3	–	0
Rankings from AP Poll

The 1943 North Texas Aggies football team represented North Texas Agricultural College (NTAC)—now known as the University of Texas at Arlington—as an independent during the 1943 college football season. In their ninth year under head coach Klepto Holmes, the Aggies compiled a 3–4–1 record and were ranked at No. 69 among the nation's college and military service teams in the final 1943 Litkenhous Ratings.

Prior to World War II, the North Texas Aggies were a junior college team that did not compete at the highest level in football. During the war, the school became a military training center, and the football team was rebuilt with United States Marine Corps trainees. Texas columnist Flem R. Hall in September 1943 described the Aggies as a Cinderella team that went "from rags to riches" when the Marine Corps waved a magic wand that sent players from major Texas universities "tumbling onto" the Aggies' Arlington campus. Hall continued: "The unknown kitchen maid became the queen of the ball and won the prince."

The Aggies gained 11 players who were transferred from TCU, including tailback Pete Stout, center James Woodfin, Sam Weatherford, and Don Hughes. Other notable transferees included fullback Howard "Red" Maley, tackle Burnie Smith, blocking back "Peck" McMinn and center Jim Sid Wright (all from SMU); lineman Harold Crossen, Doyle Caraway, James Reid, lineman P. A. Wynn and Joe Beavers (all from Texas Tech).

== Schedule ==
Date	Time	Opponent	Site	Result	Attendance	Source
September 18		vs. Southwestern (TX)	Farrington Field; Fort Worth, TX	L 0–20	12,000	
October 2	3:00 p.m.	at SMU	Ownby Stadium; University Park, TX	W 20–6	4,000	
October 9		at Camp Fannin	Tyler, TX	W 48–0		
October 15		vs. Southwestern (TX)	House Park; Austin, TX	L 0–26		
October 23		at Texas A&M	Kyle Field; College Station, TX	T 0–0		
October 30	2:30 p.m.	at Blackland AAF	Municipal Stadium; Waco, TX	L 7–13		
November 13		at Texas Tech	Tech Field; Lubbock, TX	W 34–14	3,600	
November 20		at Randolph Field	Grater Field; Randolph Field, TX	L 13–20		
All times are in Central time
