= Bessemer City High School (Alabama) =

Public high school in Bessemer, Alabama

Location
- 4950 Premiere Parkway; Bessemer, Alabama 35020; United States; 33°22′15″N 86°59′57″W

Information
- Type: Public
- Established: 1970 (56 years ago)
- School district: Bessemer City Schools
- CEEB code: 010311
- Principal: Stoney Pritchet
- Teaching staff: 35.00 (FTE)
- Grades: 9–12
- Enrollment: 760 (2024–2025)
- Student to teacher ratio: 21.71
- Campus: Suburban
- Colors: Purple and white
- Athletics: AHSAA Class 6A
- Nickname: Tigers
- Feeder schools: Bessemer City Middle School
- Website: bchs.bessk12.org

Bessemer City High School (BCHS) is a four-year public high school in Bessemer, Alabama. It is the only high school in the Bessemer City School System. School colors are purple and white, and the athletic teams are called the Tigers. BCHS competes in AHSAA Class 6A athletics.

BCHS was constructed in 2010 as a replacement for the aging Jess Lanier High School, which was founded in 1970 and named for the former Bessemer mayor of the same name. The name of the present school was chosen by a poll of Bessemer students and residents. BCHS received 1,981 votes, compared to 671 for "Marvel City High School" and 665 for "Bessemer Millennium High School".

== Campuses and history ==
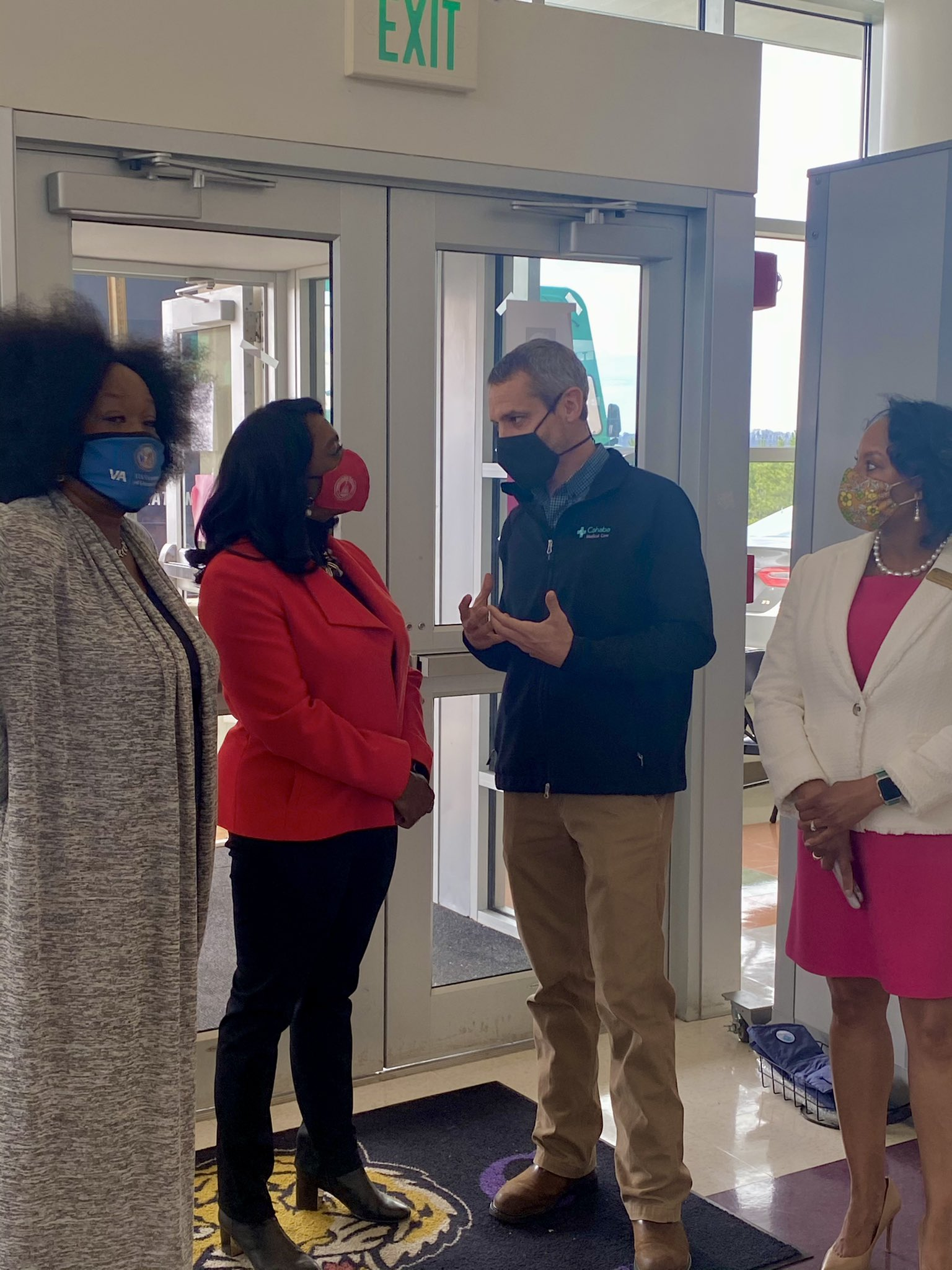
Congressmember Terri Sewell visiting the high school in March 2021.

The present Bessemer City High School (BCHS) is the systems' flagship school and the third descendant school to carry the city's name. It was completed in January 2010 and the 215,000-square-foot facility is perched on the high point of a 72-acre site. The $50 million high school and athletic complex was largely funded by a bond fund issued by the Jefferson County Commission that was financed by a 1¢ sales tax increase in Jefferson County. That tax, championed by then Jefferson County Commission President Larry Langford, and supported by others on the Commission who divided its revenues on a formula basis among all the school systems in Jefferson County. The new multi-story school which is visible from Interstate 59 can be accessed via the Academy Drive Exit of I-59. The present BCHS building incorporates a curved steel roof and is clad with three shades of brick. Large expanses of glass wrap the massive L-shaped concourse that connect the three wings, academic, arts, and athletics. The school accommodates 1,500 students with a 760 seat auditorium and a combination PE/competition gym seating 1,500 for basketball games. The facility also has large band, choral, and jazz rehearsal spaces and a two-story career tech wing.

The current high school was preceded by Jess Lanier High School. It operated between 1970 and 2010. That building is still in use by the Bessemer School System and re-named and became Bessemer City Middle School (grades 6–8) in 2013 replacing Davis Middle School. That structure is largely a single-story building made of brick and steel and typical of late 1960s style school architecture. Its campus is located near Memorial Drive in the area of the city behind the Medical Center.

The second "Bessemer High School" was built in 1923 and still exists although the facility no longer belongs to the Board of Education. It faces south on 2nd Avenue between 14th and 15th Street and occupies the entire city block. It is near what would be considered the downtown area. That two-story building primarily has a dark red brick facing with a gray-colored rough stone facing from the ground to the bottom of the first story windows. Most of its entrance ways have arched masonry pediments. For many years after it ceased to be a school, it served as a Jehovah's Witnesses Christian Church facility until it was again sold in February 2019 to another religious organization, Fountain of Life Ministries.

The first facility named "Bessemer High School" was located on the southeast corner of Arlington Avenue and 19th Street. It was a 3-story yellow brick building with rows of wood-cased windows surrounded by stone edging. Its cornerstone was dated October 23, 1908, and it opened about 1910. Only its cornerstone survives today and can be seen at the Bessemer Hall of History. After that building ceased to be the city high school in 1923, it was re-named Arlington Elementary and served in that capacity for many years. After it ceased to be an elementary school the building was abandoned and allow to fall into disrepair. It was demolished sometime after mid-2014 and the site remains a vacant lot. Today only remnants of a stone retaining wall that run parallel to the sidewalk along the property edge are visible remains.

At the same time that the second Bessemer High opened the city system also operated Dunbar High School which was a separate high school for black students. Dunbar's first graduating class was in 1927. It was located at 2715 6th Avenue and named after Paul Laurence Dunbar, an African-American poet, novelist, and playwright of the late 19th and early 20th century. Dunbar High School was replaced by Abrams High School (1959–1987). The Dunbar High School building continued to function as an elementary school from 1959 until 1980. Today it serves as a community center. The Abrams High School building today serves as Abrams Elementary School. The city also operated for many years Carver High School (named after George Washington Carver (also for black students) which was located at 600 2nd Avenue North. That facility closed following the 1969 school year and its students transferred to the then-new Jess Lanier High School. The Carver High School building no longer exists.

Also, on site with the current Bessemer City High School are a new synthetic turf football stadium seating 4,500, a nine-lane track, a new restroom/concessions building, and a spacious new field house at the end zone of the new field. Also on site are a new baseball field and press box as well as a new softball field and press box/concessions building.

== Student profile ==
Enrollment in grades 9–12 for the 2013–14 school year is 996 students. Approximately 94% of students are African-American, 4% are Hispanic, and 2% are white. Roughly 83% of students qualify for free or reduced-price lunch.

BCHS has a graduation rate of 73%. Approximately 57% of its students meet or exceed state proficiency standards in mathematics, and 62% meet or exceed standards in reading. The average ACT score for BCHS students is 20.

As of the year of 2026, BCHA has a total of 760 high school students, relatively evenly distributed from grades 9 through 12. School demographics are composed mostly of Black students, forming 76.7% of the student body.

== Athletics ==
BCHS competes in AHSAA Class 6A athletics and fields teams in the following sports:

- Baseball
- Basketball
- Cheerleading
- Football
- Indoor Track & Field
- Outdoor Track & Field
- Soccer
- Softball
- Volleyball

BCHS won the 1990 Alabama Football Playoff championship when the school was known as Jess Lanier High School by defeating Murphy High School of Mobile 22–0 in the title game. The Purple Tigers head coach at the time was Carroll Cox who in 21 years (1979–1999) as Jess Lanier's coach compiled a record of 162–77–2. Cox was the school's winningest coach having won just five more games than Snitz Snider. The old downtown campus school on 2nd Avenue was declared state football champions four times in an era in which no playoff existed with Bessemer receiving "mythical titles" in 1940, 1951, 1952, and 1954. During this era, the school played its games at Bessemer Stadium located at 915 4th Avenue North. The stadium was renamed Snitz Snider Stadium in 1972 to honor the long-time Bessemer coach. The Jess Lanier Tigers played their final football game at the old stadium on November 13, 2009, in a tough loss to Hoover High School in the 2nd round of the playoffs. The Tigers had gone 9–1 during the 2009 regular season winning the final regular season game at the stadium over Stanhope Elmore 17–14 on October 30, 2009. The Bessemer School Board put the old stadium up for sale in 2017, but it is still unsold as of December 2019. The next year they began playing at the new on-campus stadium at Bessemer City High School. The first home game was on September 3, 2010, against Gardendale High School and the first win in the new facility was on September 17, 2010, against Jackson-Olin High School by a score of 20–15.

Bessemer's longest traditional football rival are the Hueytown High School Golden Gophers, whom they have played 75 times through 2019. The Tigers and the Gophers first played in 1922, the last year the original campus on Arlington Avenue served as the school. For many years this game was played on Thanksgiving Day. The second most common football opponent was Ensley High School of Birmingham (which no longer exists). Bessemer leads the now-defunct series over the Yellowjackets 33–22–2. The third most common opponent on the gridiron is Woodlawn High School of Birmingham. Bessemer leads that series 27–16–2. The most one-sided game in Bessemer High School football history was a victory over Bibb County High School played on October 11, 1919, which the Tigers won by a score of 93–0. The current head football coach as Bessemer City High School is Antonio Nelson.

Bessemer played its first recorded football game in 1910, although some records indicate it may have been 1907. Through the 2018 season, the football records is 648-375-34. The Bessemer High School Tigers are the winningest football program in Jefferson County history. The Tigers have slightly more than 110 additional victories than the second place school, Shades Valley High School. Plus, they lead the third place Hoover High School by more than 150 wins.

Bessemer High School won the State Championship in Boys Track and Field in 1925, 1927, 1928, 1949, and 1950.

== Notable alumni ==
- Maxie Baughan, (Class of 1957), Bessemer High School; College Football Hall of Fame; Alabama Sports Hall of Fame (1983); NFL Player (14 years); Cornell Univ. Head Coach (6 years); NFL Asst. Coach (1975–1998)
- Butch Hobson (Class of 1969) Bessemer High School; Major League Baseball Player and Manager
- Quintayvious Hutchins, (Class of 2021), Bessemer City High School; NFL linebacker for the New England Patriots
- Kerry Rhodes, (Class of 2000), Jess Lanier High School; NFL Football player, New York Jets and Arizona Cardinals
- DeMeco Ryans, (Class of 2002), Jess Lanier High School; former NFL Football player and current Head Coach for the Houston Texans
- Jimmie Stephens, President of the Jefferson County Commission
- Darryl Williams, NFL center
