= Klepto Holmes =

American football player and coach (1906–1952)

Biographical details
- Born: March 31, 1906; Grand Saline, Texas, U.S.
- Died: February 26, 1952 (aged 45); College Station, Texas, U.S.

Playing career
- 1927: Texas A&M
- Position: Tackle

Coaching career (HC unless noted)
- 1929–1932: Texas A&M (line)
- 1933: Cuero HS (TX)
- 1934: Alamo Heights HS (TX)
- 1935–1950: North Texas Aggies / Arlington State
- 1951: Texas A&M (freshmen)

Head coaching record
- Overall: 77–67–5 (junior college)

Accomplishments and honors

Championships
- 3 CTC (1935–1936, 1938)

Awards
- First-team All-SWC (1927)

James Gordon "Klepto" Holmes (March 31, 1906 – February 26, 1952) was an American football coach. He was the sixth head football coach at Arlington State College—now known as the University of Texas at Arlington—serving for 16 seasons, from 1935 to 1950.

Holmes earned his nickname while a student at North Texas Agricultural College. While visiting Terrell, Texas for a football game against Texas Military College, he and other students toured the state sanatorium located in Terrell. A female patient at the sanitorium reportedly hugged and kissed Holmes, who was dressed in his cadet uniform, and shouted "Klepto, my kleptomaniac has returned from the war."

Holmes died of a heart attack in 1952.

== Head coaching record ==
=== Junior college ===
Year	Team	Overall	Conference	Standing	Bowl/playoffs
North Texas Aggies (Central Texas Conference) (1935–1938)
1935	North Texas Aggies	9–2	7–0	1st	
1936	North Texas Aggies	7–3–1	4–0	1st	
1937	North Texas Aggies	6–4	3–2	3rd	
1938	North Texas Aggies	10–1	5–0	1st	
North Texas Aggies (Texas Junior College Conference) (1939–1941)
1939	North Texas Aggies	6–4	4–4	8th	
1940	North Texas Aggies	5–5	4–4		
1941	North Texas Aggies	7–2	6–2	2nd	
1942	North Texas Aggies	2–3–1	1–2–1	T–3rd	
North Texas Aggies (Independent) (1943–1946)
1943	North Texas Aggies	3–4–1			
1944	North Texas Aggies	2–6			
1945	North Texas Aggies	2–5			
1946	North Texas Aggies	6–4			
North Texas Aggies / Arlington State Blue Riders (Southwestern Junior College Conference) (1947–1949)
1947	North Texas Aggies	6–3	4–3	4th	
1948	North Texas Aggies	4–5	3–4	T–5th	
1949	Arlington State	1–9	0–7	8th	
Arlington State Blue Riders (Pioneer Conference) (1950)
1950	Arlington State	1–7–2	0–3	4th	
North Texas Aggies / Arlington State:		77–67–5	40–31		
Total:		77–67–5			
National championship Conference title Conference division title or championship game berth
