= 1943 Virginia Cavaliers football team =

American college football season

1943 Virginia Cavaliers football
- Conference: Independent
- Record: 3–4–1
- Head coach: Frank Murray (7th season)
- Captains: Richard Cofer; Robert Seiler
- Home stadium: Scott Stadium

1943 Southern college football independents records
	Conf.			Overall
Team	W	L	T	W		L		T
No. 4 Navy		–		8	–	1	–	0
Miami (FL)		–		5	–	1	–	0
West Virginia		–		4	–	3	–	0
Howard (AL)		–		2	–	2	–	0
North Texas Aggies		–		3	–	4	–	1
Virginia		–		3	–	4	–	1
Texas Tech		–		4	–	6	–	0
Tennessee Tech		–		1	–	5	–	0
Sewanee		–		0	–	3	–	0
Rankings from AP Poll

The 1943 Virginia Cavaliers football team represented the University of Virginia during the 1943 college football season. The Cavaliers were led by seventh-year head coach Frank Murray and played their home games at Scott Stadium in Charlottesville, Virginia. They competed as independents, finishing with a record of 3–4–1.

In the final Litkenhous Ratings, Virginia ranked 107th among the nation's college and service teams with a rating of 64.2.

== Schedule ==
Date	Opponent	Site	Result	Attendance	Source
September 25	Richmond AAB	Scott Stadium; Charlottesville, VA	T 7–7	3,000	
October 2	vs. West Virginia	Laidley Field; Charleston, WV	W 6–0		
October 9	Richmond^{†}	Scott Stadium; Charlottesville, VA	L 7–16	4,500	
October 23	at Apprentice	Apprentice Field; Newport News, VA	L 6–7		
October 30	at VMI	Alumni Field; Lexington, VA	W 34–0	2,500	
November 6	Maryland	Scott Stadium; Charlottesville, VA (rivalry)	W 39–0	4,000	
November 13	at No. 7 Duke	Duke Stadium; Durham, NC	L 0–49	6,000	
November 27	vs. North Carolina	Foreman Field; Norfolk, VA (South's Oldest Rivalry)	L 7–54	15,000	
^{†}Homecoming; Rankings from AP Poll released prior to the game
