= Howard Seadogs football, 1943–1945 =

American college football seasons

The Howard Seadogs were a college football team fielded by participants of the V-12 Navy College Training Program at Howard College (now known as Samford University) in the college football seasons of 1943, 1944, and 1945 during World War II. In January 1942, Howard announced their intercollegiate football program would be suspended for the duration of the war. After abandoning football for the 1942 college football season, in September 1943 College Chairman Frank P. Samford announced the school would field a team for the 1943 season. Called the Seadogs, the team was composed of trainees from the V-12 Unit.

Euil Snider served as head coach for the 1943 season and led the Seadogs to an overall record of 2–2. After Snider resigned as head coach and athletic director, Bub Walker was hired as head coach and athletic director at Howard after a stint as an assistant coach at Wake Forest. During Walker's two seasons he led the Seadogs, Howard was winless with an overall record of 0–10.

Prior to the start of the 1945 season, College President Harwell Davis stated it would likely be the last for the school as a result primarily of monetary losses and a small fan following throughout Birmingham. Howard did not field teams in either 1946 or 1947 and only fielded a student-led and coached club called the Howard College Sportsmen’s Club in 1948. In May 1949, school officials announced Howard would reinstate intercollegiate football for the 1949 season with Earl Gartman as head coach.

== 1943 ==
1943 Howard Seadogs football
- Conference: Independent
- Record: 2–2
- Head coach: Euil Snider (1st season)
- Home stadium: Legion Field

1943 Southern college football independents records
	Conf.			Overall
Team	W	L	T	W		L		T
No. 4 Navy		–		8	–	1	–	0
Miami (FL)		–		5	–	1	–	0
West Virginia		–		4	–	3	–	0
Howard (AL)		–		2	–	2	–	0
North Texas Aggies		–		3	–	4	–	1
Virginia		–		3	–	4	–	1
Texas Tech		–		4	–	6	–	0
Tennessee Tech		–		1	–	5	–	0
Sewanee		–		0	–	3	–	0
Rankings from AP Poll

The 1943 Howard Seadogs football team was an American football team that represented Howard College (now known as Samford University) as an independent during the 1943 college football season. In their first year under head coach Euil Snider, the team compiled a 2–2 record. Howard played their home games at Legion Field in Birmingham, Alabama.

Schedule

Date	Opponent	Site	Result	Attendance	Source
October 23	Carson–Newman	Legion Field; Birmingham, AL	L 20–27	3,000	
October 29	at Georgia	Sanford Stadium; Athens, GA	L 0–39	4,500	
November 6	at Alabama Informals	Denny Stadium; Tuscaloosa, AL	W 42–6	7,000	
November 20	Sewanee	Legion Field; Birmingham, AL	W 42–6	3,000	

== 1944 ==
1944 Howard Seadogs football
- Conference: Independent
- Record: 0–5
- Head coach: Bub Walker (1st season)
- Home stadium: Legion Field

1944 Southern college football independents records
	Conf.			Overall
Team	W	L	T	W		L		T
Virginia		–		6	–	1	–	2
No. 4 Navy		–		6	–	3	–	0
West Virginia		–		5	–	3	–	1
Millsaps		–		3	–	6	–	0
Delaware State		–		2	–	3	–	0
Tennessee Tech		–		1	–	2	–	0
North Texas Aggies		–		2	–	6	–	0
Miami (FL)		–		1	–	7	–	1
Sewanee		–		0	–	3	–	1
Howard (AL)		–		0	–	5	–	0
Rankings from AP Poll

The 1944 Howard Seadogs football team was an American football team that represented Howard College (now known as the Samford University) as an independent during the 1944 college football season. In their first year under head coach Bub Walker, the team compiled an 0–5 record. Howard played their home games at Legion Field in Birmingham, Alabama.

Schedule

Date	Opponent	Site	Result	Attendance	Source
September 23	at Millsaps	Tiger Stadium; Jackson, MS	L 14–20	5,000	
September 29	at Auburn	Cramton Bowl; Montgomery, AL	L 0–32	10,000	
October 7	Alabama	Legion Field; Birmingham, AL	L 7–63	5,000	
October 14	vs. Carson–Newman	Florence, AL	L 6–12	2,500	
October 21	Millsaps	Legion Field; Birmingham, AL	L 7–19		

== 1945 ==
1945 Howard Seadogs football
- Conference: Independent
- Record: 0–5
- Head coach: Bub Walker (2nd season)
- Home stadium: Legion Field

1945 Southern college football independents records
	Conf.			Overall
Team	W	L	T	W		L		T
Miami (FL)		–		9	–	1	–	1
No. 3 Navy		–		7	–	1	–	1
Louisiana Normal (Grambling)		–		9	–	2	–	0
Virginia		–		7	–	2	–	0
Chattanooga		–		5	–	3	–	0
Jacksonville State		–		1	–	1	–	0
West Virginia		–		2	–	6	–	1
Tennessee Tech		–		1	–	8	–	0
Howard (AL)		–		0	–	5	–	0
Rankings from AP Poll

The 1945 Howard Seadogs football team was an American football team that represented Howard College (now known as the Samford University) as an independent during the 1945 college football season. In their second year under head coach Bub Walker, the team compiled an 0–5 record. Howard played their home games at Legion Field in Birmingham, Alabama.

Schedule

Date	Opponent	Site	Result	Attendance	Source
September 21	at Auburn	Cramton Bowl; Montgomery, AL	L 0–38	14,000	
September 29	at Louisiana Tech	Tech Stadium; Ruston, LA	L 6–32		
October 5	at Murray State	Cutchin Stadium; Murray, KY	L 6–41		
October 13	at Georgia Tech	Grant Field; Atlanta, GA	L 0–43	15,000	
October 19	at Chattanooga	Chamberlain Field; Chattanooga, TN	L 7–47		
