= 1943 Navy Midshipmen football team =

American college football season

1943 Navy Midshipmen football

Eastern champion
- Conference: Independent

Ranking
- AP: No. 4
- Record: 8–1
- Head coach: John Whelchel (2nd season)
- Captain: Albert Channell
- Home stadium: Thompson Stadium

1943 Southern college football independents records
	Conf.			Overall
Team	W	L	T	W		L		T
No. 4 Navy		–		8	–	1	–	0
Miami (FL)		–		5	–	1	–	0
West Virginia		–		4	–	3	–	0
Howard (AL)		–		2	–	2	–	0
North Texas Aggies		–		3	–	4	–	1
Virginia		–		3	–	4	–	1
Texas Tech		–		4	–	6	–	0
Tennessee Tech		–		1	–	5	–	0
Sewanee		–		0	–	3	–	0
Rankings from AP Poll

The 1943 Navy Midshipmen football team represented the United States Naval Academy during the 1943 college football season. In their second season under head coach John Whelchel, the Midshipmen compiled an 8–1 record, shut out three opponents and outscored all opponents by a combined score of 237 to 80. Navy was ranked No. 4 in the final AP poll.

Hal Hamburg, a 150-pound, junior halfback for Navy, finished sixth in the voting for the 1943 Heisman Trophy.

== Schedule ==
Date	Opponent	Rank	Site	Result	Attendance	Source
September 25	North Carolina Pre-Flight		Thompson Stadium; Annapolis, MD	W 31–0	12,231	
October 2	vs. Cornell		Municipal Stadium; Baltimore, MD	W 46–7	32,546	
October 9	vs. No. 5 Duke	No. 4	Municipal Stadium; Baltimore, MD	W 14–13	55,600	
October 16	Penn State	No. 3	Thompson Stadium; Annapolis, MD	W 14–6		
October 23	vs. Georgia Tech	No. 3	Municipal Stadium; Baltimore, MD	W 28–14	56,223	
October 30	vs. No. 1 Notre Dame	No. 3	Municipal Stadium; Cleveland, OH (rivalry)	L 6–33	77,900	
November 6	at No. 5 Penn	No. 7	Franklin Field; Philadelphia, PA	W 24–7	73,000	
November 13	at Columbia	No. 3	Baker Field; New York, NY	W 61–0	20,000	
November 27	at No. 7 Army	No. 6	Michie Stadium; West Point, NY (Army–Navy Game)	W 13–0		
Rankings from AP Poll released prior to the game

== Rankings ==
Ranking movements Legend: ██ Increase in ranking ██ Decrease in ranking ( ) = First-place votes
	Week								
Poll	1	2	3	4	5	6	7	8	Final
AP	4 (3)	3 (1)	3	3	7	3	5	6	4
