= 1943 Sewanee Tigers football team =

American college football season

1943 Sewanee Tigers football
- Conference: Independent
- Record: 0–3
- Head coach: George Hall (1st season)
- Home stadium: Hardee Field

1943 Southern college football independents records
	Conf.			Overall
Team	W	L	T	W		L		T
No. 4 Navy		–		8	–	1	–	0
Miami (FL)		–		5	–	1	–	0
West Virginia		–		4	–	3	–	0
Howard (AL)		–		2	–	2	–	0
North Texas Aggies		–		3	–	4	–	1
Virginia		–		3	–	4	–	1
Texas Tech		–		4	–	6	–	0
Tennessee Tech		–		1	–	5	–	0
Sewanee		–		0	–	3	–	0
Rankings from AP Poll

The 1943 Sewanee Tigers football team was an American football team that represented Sewanee: The University of the South as an independent during the 1943 college football season. Three games were scheduled and attempts by Vanderbilt to schedule a game with Sewanee failed.

== Schedule ==
Date	Opponent	Site	Result	Attendance	Source
October 8	Carson–Newman	Hardee Field; Sewanee, TN	L 20–26		
November 13	at Tennessee Tech	Cookeville, TN	L 0–12		
November 20	at Howard (AL)	Legion Field; Birmingham, AL	L 6–42	3,000	
