= John D. and Katherine Gleissner Lustron House =

Historic house in Alabama, United States

- U.S. National Register of Historic Places
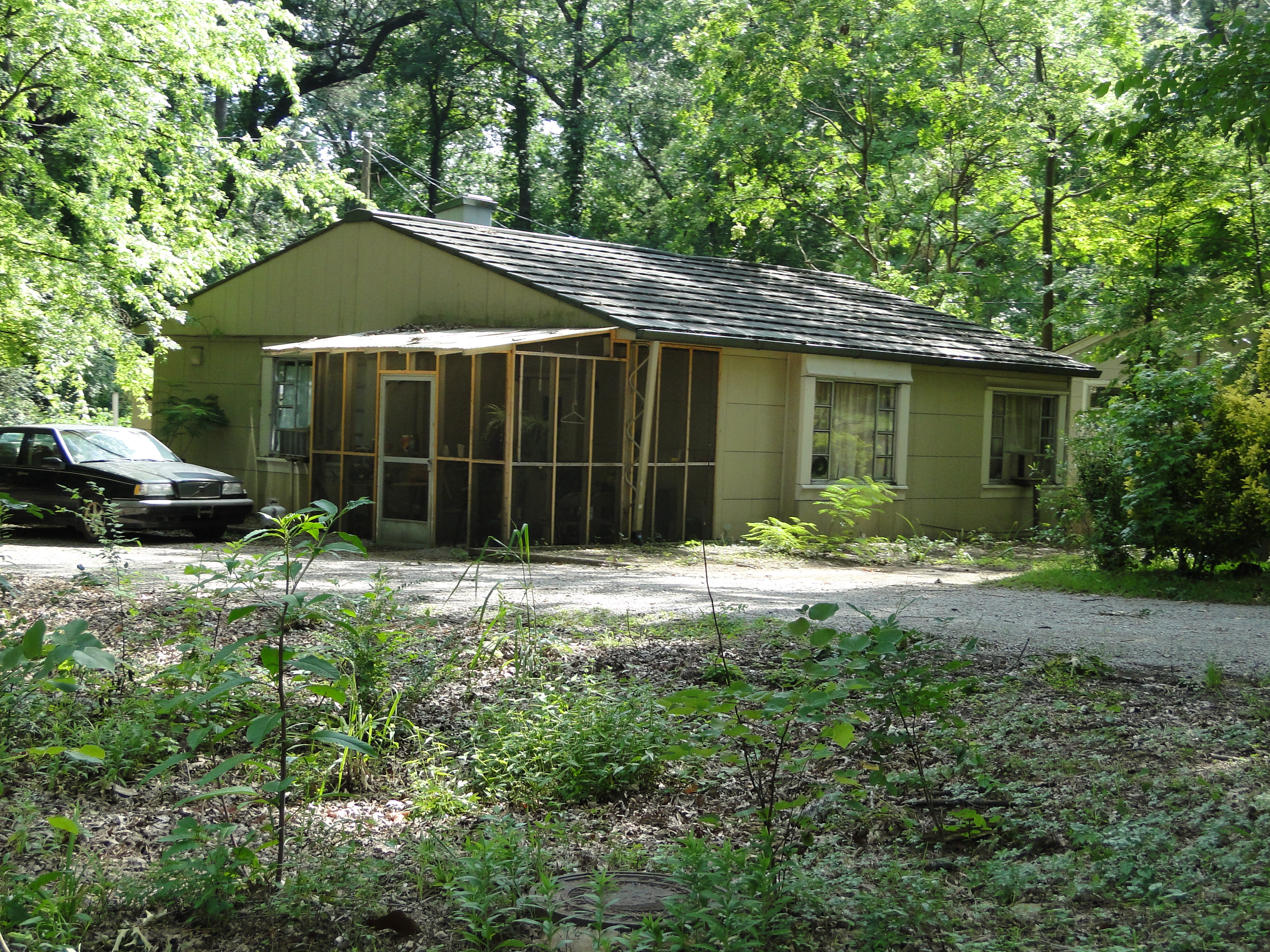
- Gleissner Lustron in 2011

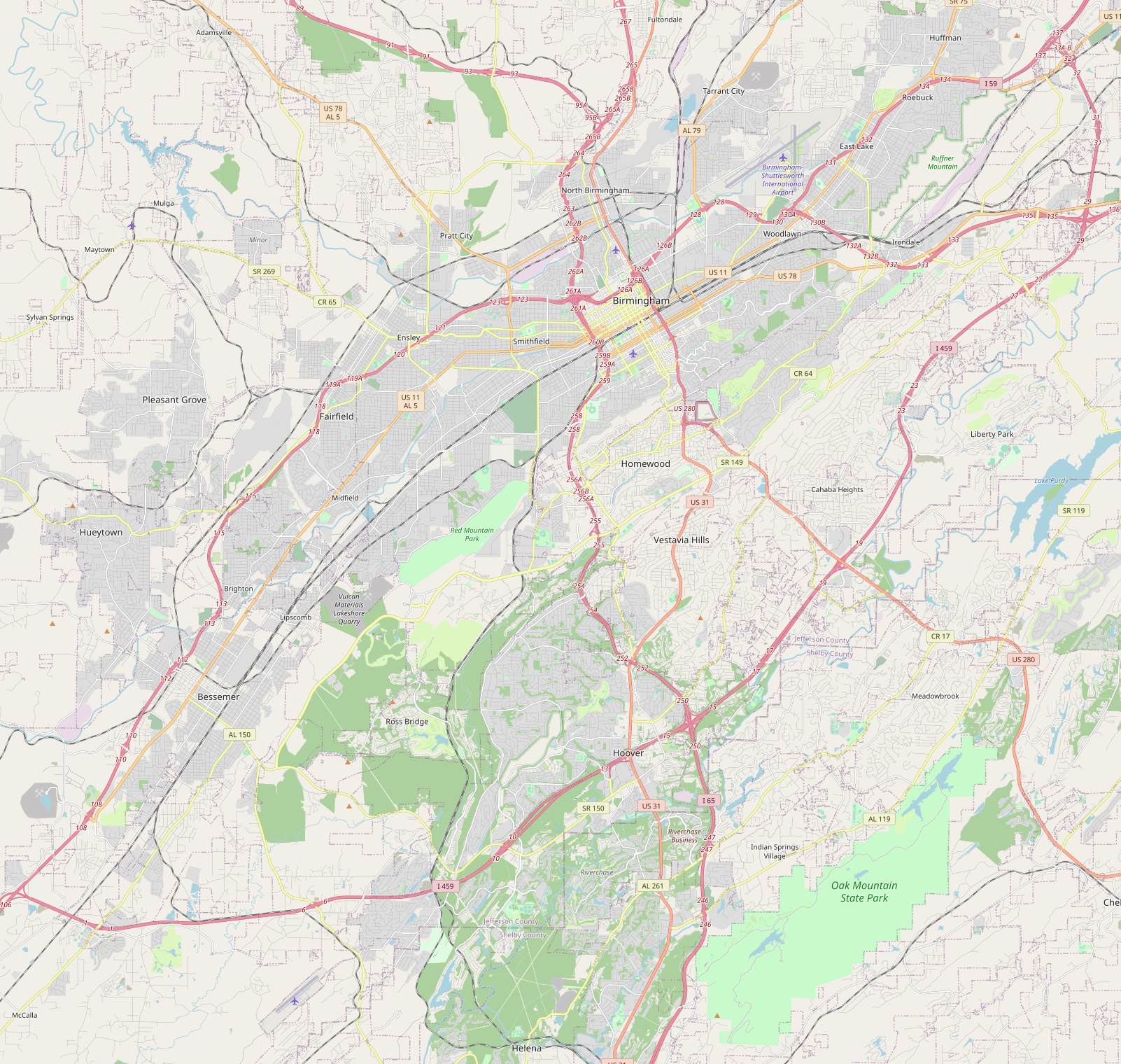
- Location within Birmingham, Alabama Location within Alabama Location within the United States
- Location: 2420 Cahaba Rd., Birmingham, Alabama
- Coordinates: 33°29′27″N 86°46′44″W
- Area: less than one acre
- Built: 1949
- Architect: Koch, Carl & Associates; Lustron Corporation
- Architectural style: Lustron House
- MPS: Lustron Houses in Alabama, MPS
- NRHP reference No.: 00000133
- Added to NRHP: February 24, 2000

The John D. and Katherine Gleissner Lustron House is a historic enameled steel prefabricated house in Birmingham, Alabama. Designed and constructed by the Lustron Corporation, this example is one of three confirmed to have been built in Birmingham. Another, the Bernice L. Wright Lustron House, is just one house over from the Gleissner Lustron House.

Lustron houses were only produced during a two-year period, with 2,495 known to have been made. A majority of those originally constructed (roughly 2,000) are still standing today. Many of those that do remain have been altered significantly. Twenty Lustron houses are known to have been ordered in Alabama, although it is not clear if twenty were erected. Only eleven remained in 2000.

The house forms part of the National Register of Historic Places' Lustron Houses in Alabama MPS. It was placed on the National Register on February 24, 2000, due to its architectural significance. The house was slated for demolition in 2015 to make way for a condominium development.

== Architecture ==
The Gleissner Lustron House is an example of Lustron's "Westchester" 3-bedroom model. It retains the original enameled steel roof, wall panels, and "zig-zag" support column, although a wood-frame porch extension has been added to the original porch and all of it screened in. Lustron houses came in several exterior colors. The Gleissner Lustron is in the company's "Desert Tan" color.
