= Mountain Brook Estates Building =

- U.S. National Register of Historic Places
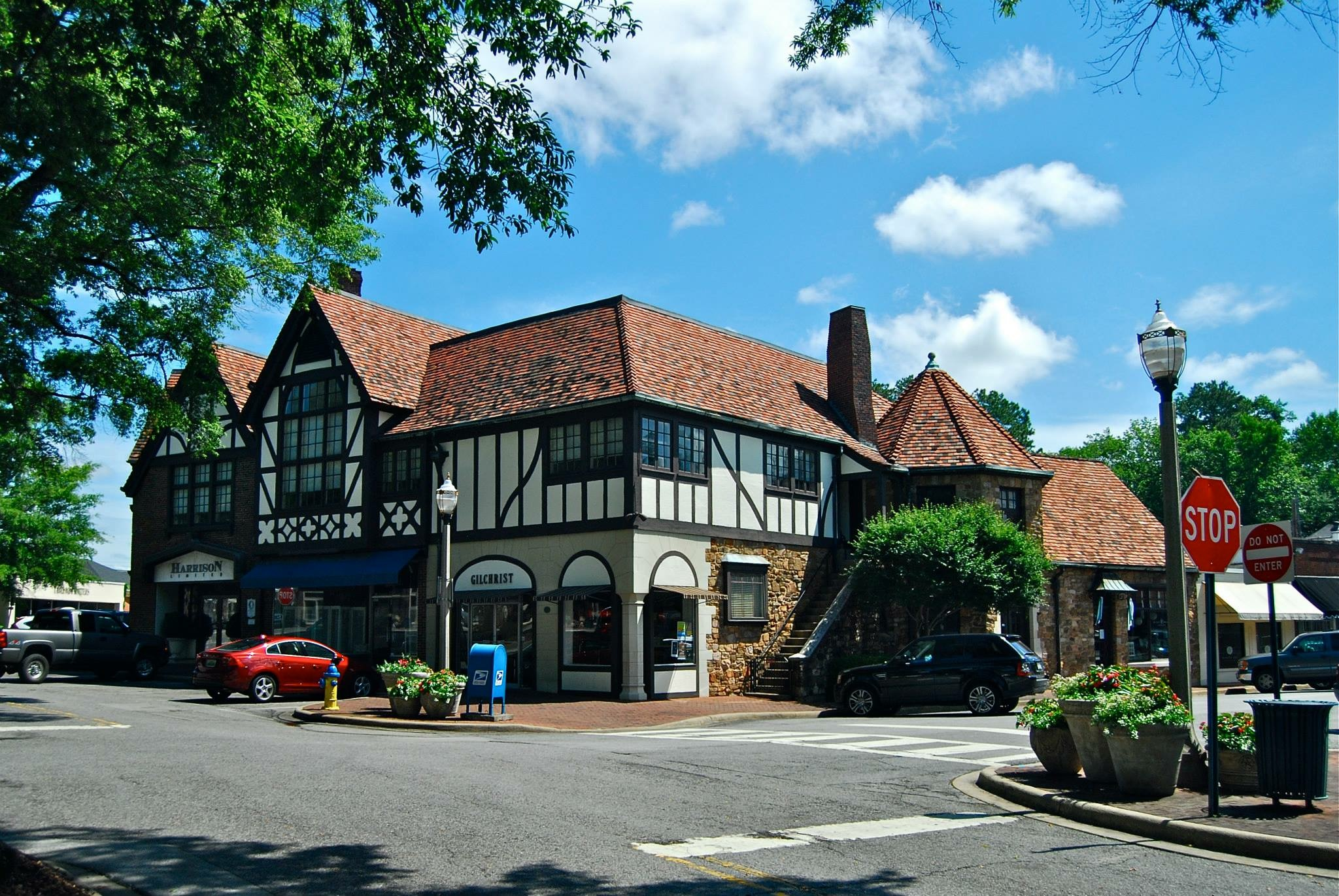
- The building in August 2018

- Location within Alabama Location within the United States
- Location: 2803 Cahaba Rd., Mountain Brook, Alabama
- Coordinates: 33°29′9″N 86°46′21″W
- Built: 1928
- Built by: L.E. Ford
- Architect: Jesse W. Green
- Architectural style: Tudor Revival
- NRHP reference No.: 03000232
- Added to NRHP: April 8, 2003

The Mountain Brook Estates Building is a commercial building in the planned community of Mountain Brook, Alabama. The neo-medieval building was built as the commercial center of the suburban community. Built in 1928, it is a steel structure clad with half-timbering meant to evoke an idealized English town center. Mountain Brook Estates is one of the three most significant examples of a romanticized suburb in the United States, along with Grosse Pointe, Michigan and Country Club Plaza in Kansas City, Missouri.

== Description ==
The Mountain Brook Estates Building is a one and two story steel-framed structure with five ground floor commercial tenant spaces. Offices are on the second floor. It is situated on the town center circle, with one-story arms on side streets. The building is underlain by a full basement. The ground floor is mainly brick, while the upper level is mainly half-timbering and stucco. The roof is tile shingle. The design is a picturesque interpretation of early English town buildings.

The building was placed on the National Register of Historic Places on April 8, 2003.
