= Bernice L. Wright Lustron House =

Historic house in Alabama, United States

- U.S. National Register of Historic Places
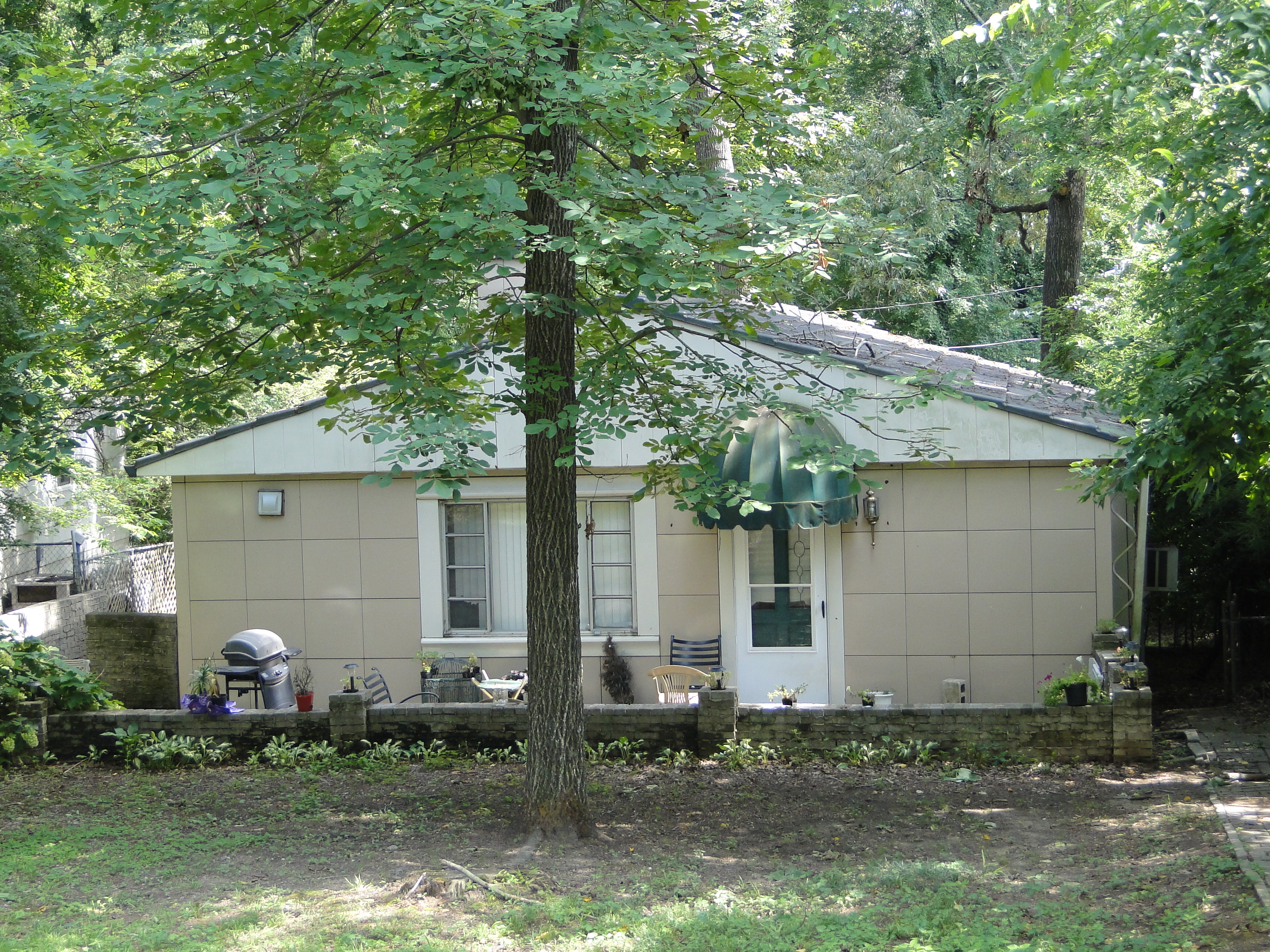
- Wright Lustron in 2011

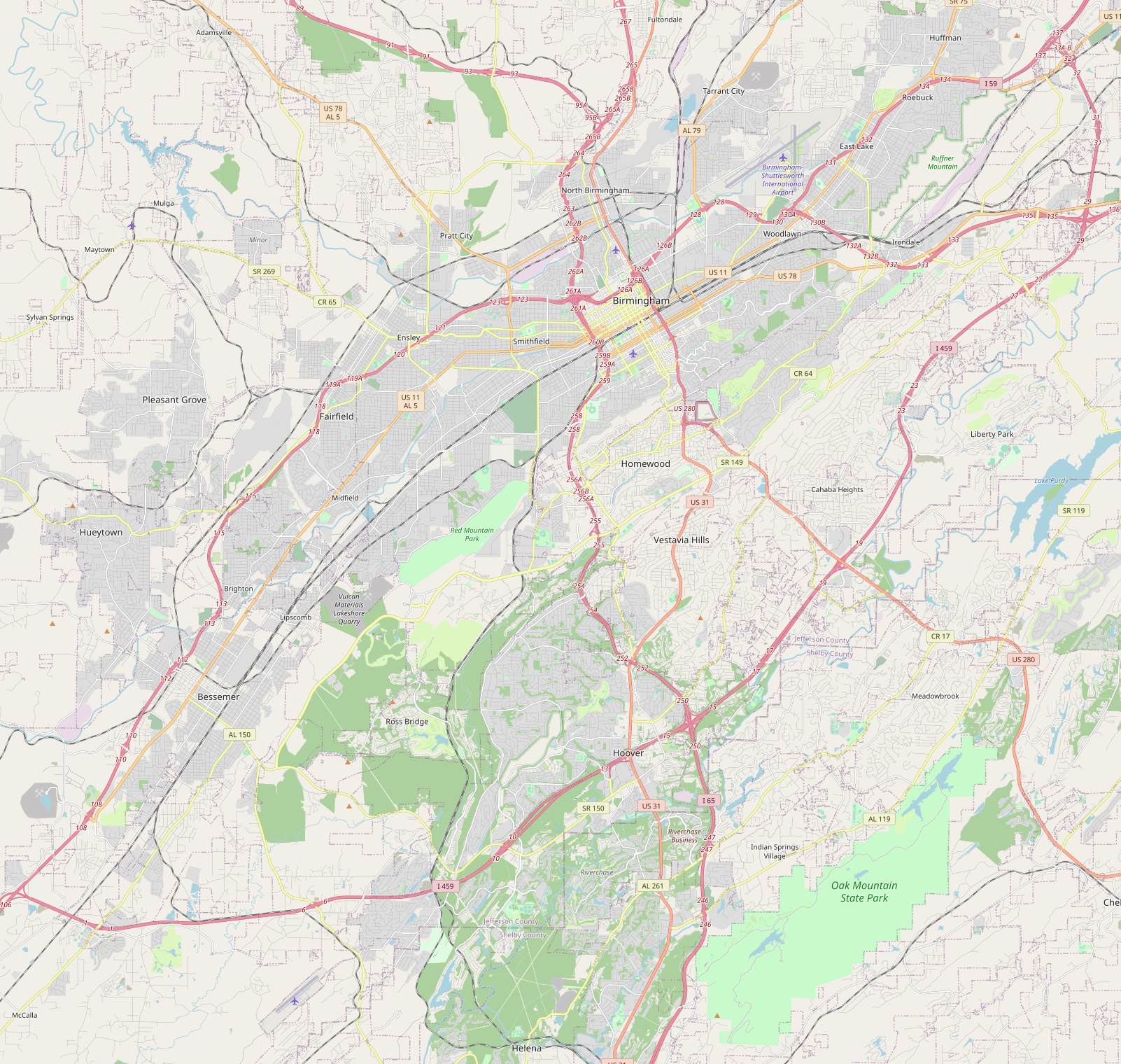
- Location within Birmingham, Alabama Location within Alabama Location within the United States
- Location: 2424 Cahaba Rd., Birmingham, Alabama
- Coordinates: 33°29′28″N 86°46′43″W
- Area: less than one acre
- Built: 1949
- Architect: Koch, Carl and Associates; Lustron Corporation
- Architectural style: Lustron
- MPS: Lustron Houses in Alabama, MPS
- NRHP reference No.: 00000130
- Added to NRHP: February 24, 2000

The Bernice L. Wright Lustron House is a historic enameled steel prefabricated house in Birmingham, Alabama. Designed and constructed by the Lustron Corporation, this example is one of three confirmed to have been built in Birmingham. Another, the John D. and Katherine Gleissner Lustron House, is just one house over from the Wright Lustron House.

Lustron houses were only produced during a two-year period, with 2,495 known to have been made. Only roughly 2,000 of these are still in existence. Many of those that do remain have been altered significantly. Twenty Lustron houses are known to have been ordered in Alabama, although it is not clear if twenty were erected. Only eleven remained in 2000.

The house forms part of the National Register of Historic Places' Lustron Houses in Alabama MPS. It was placed on the National Register on February 24, 2000, due to its architectural significance. The house is slated for demolition in 2015 to make way for a condominium development.

== Architecture ==
The Wright Lustron House is an example of Lustron's "Westchester" 2-bedroom model. It retains the original enameled steel roof and wall panels. Lustron houses came in several exterior colors, the Wright Lustron is in the company's "Desert Tan" color.
