= Dunbar High School (Bessemer, Alabama) =

- U.S. National Register of Historic Places
- Alabama Register of Landmarks and Heritage
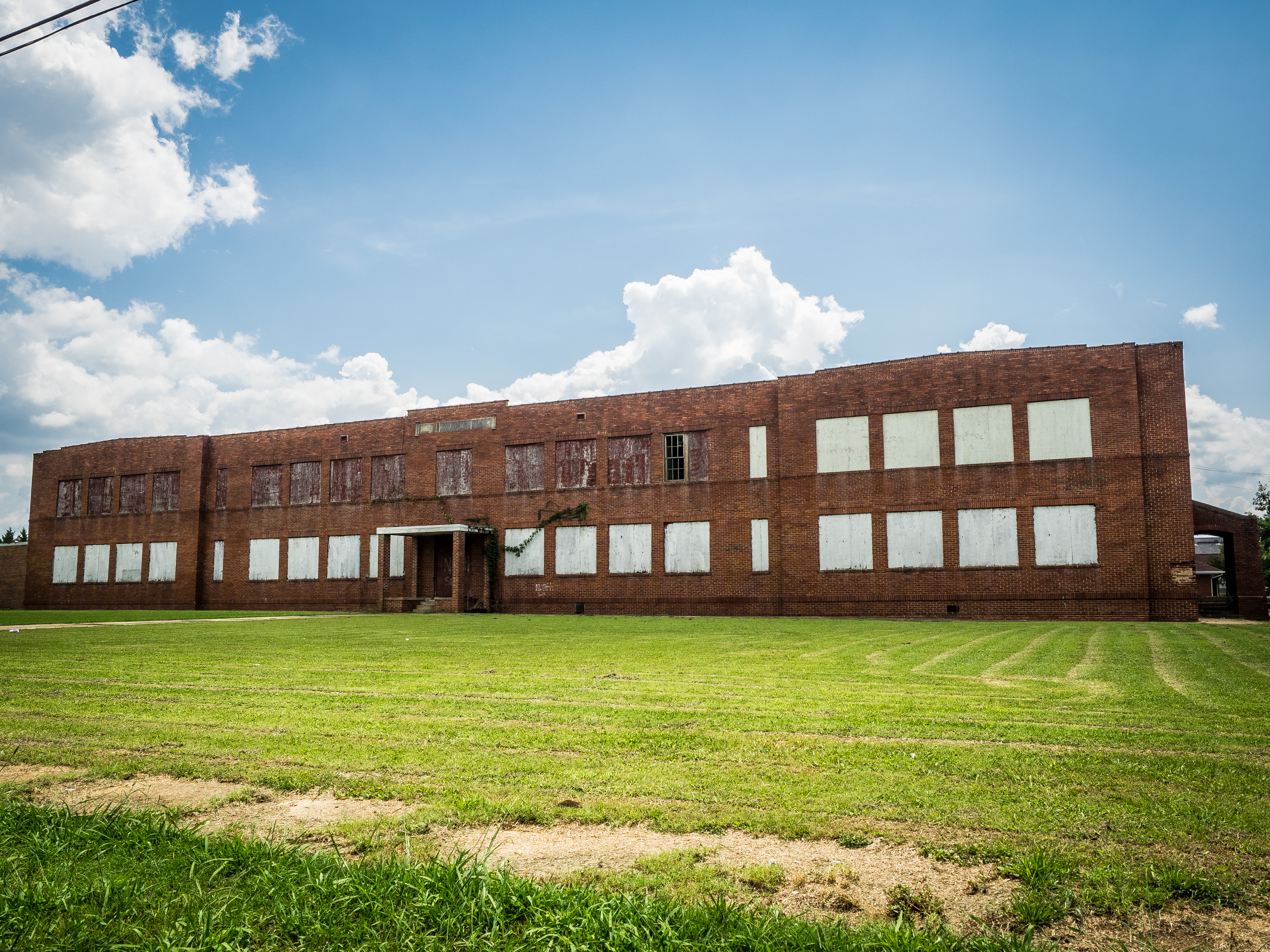

- Location within Alabama
- Location: 2715 6th Ave. N. Bessemer, Alabama
- Coordinates: 33°24′49″N 86°56′56″W
- NRHP reference No.: 10001051

Significant dates
- Added to NRHP: March 18, 2011
- Designated ARLH: February 19, 1988

Paul William Dunbar High School, originally Bessemer Colored High School, was a public school for African-American students which operated in Bessemer, Alabama from 1923 to 1980. It served grades 1 through 12 when it opened, and its first graduating class matriculated in 1927 under principal J. B. Bickerstaff. It was listed on the National Register of Historic Places on March 18, 2011.

== History ==
At the suggestion of English teacher Pearl Blivens, the school was renamed for Ohio-born poet Paul Laurence Dunbar (1872–1906) in 1928. In addition to academic subjects, the school offered a wide range of vocational training programs. Among the school's notable faculty members was Arthur Shores, a polymath who taught science, history, civics and literature. He served briefly as principal before becoming a notable civil rights attorney. Notable graduates include art collector Paul R. Jones and activist James Boggs.

Long-time principal Jackson Solomon Abrams died in 1959 and a new high school then under construction was named in his memory. Dunbar was converted into an elementary and middle school until it closed in 1980. The building was subsequently acquired by the National Dunbar-Abrams Foundation and partially renovated as a community center.

== Athletics ==
Dunbar High School fielded a football team nicknamed the Blue Devils. Their most common opponent was Westfield High School whom they played 23 times and whom they had a winning record against of 15-7-1. They played 19 times against the Rosedale High School Sons of Kong over whom they also had a winning record of 10-8-1.

== Notable alumni ==
- Alfred Hall, 32 year coaching career at Brighton High School aa head football coach with a record of (130-84-11), and leading basketball, baseball, and track programs.
- Johnnie Cornelius Laurie, (graduated 1934–1935) U.S. Navy, gave his life for his country at Battle of Pearl Harbor, December 7, 1941
- Jack Whitten

== See also ==
- National Register of Historic Places listings in Jefferson County, Alabama
