= Jack Harding =

American athlete, coach and athletics administrator (1898-1963)

Biographical details
- Born: January 4, 1898; Avoca, Pennsylvania, U.S.
- Died: February 24, 1963 (aged 65); Miami, Florida, U.S.

Playing career

Football
- 1924–1925: Pittsburgh

Coaching career (HC unless noted)

Football
- 1926–1936: St. Thomas (PA)
- 1937–1942: Miami (FL)
- 1945–1947: Miami (FL)

Basketball
- 1926–1932: St. Thomas (PA)
- 1933–1937: St. Thomas (PA)

Baseball
- 1940: Miami (FL)
- 1959: Miami (FL)

Administrative career (AD unless noted)
- 1948–1963: Miami (FL)

Head coaching record
- Overall: 103–69–12 (football); 119–56 (basketball); 16–14–1 (baseball)
- Bowls: 1–0
- College Football Hall of Fame; Inducted in 1980 (profile)

John Joseph Harding (January 4, 1898 – February 24, 1963) was an American football, basketball, and baseball player, coach, and college athletics administrator. He served as the head football coach at St. Thomas College—now the University of Scranton—from 1926 to 1936 and at the University of Miami from 1937 to 1942 and 1945 to 1947, compiling a career college football record of 103–69–12. Harding was also the head basketball coach at St. Thomas from 1926 to 1937, amassing record of 119–56. He was the head baseball coach at Miami in 1940 and 1959, tallying a mark of 16–14–1. Harding was inducted into the College Football Hall of Fame as a coach in 1980.

During his two stints coaching football at Miami, Harding compiled a 54–32–3 (.624) record and led the Hurricanes to four seasons of eight or more wins (1938, 1941, 1945, 1946). After resigning from coaching football, he served as the athletic director at Miami for 15 years until his death from cancer, on February 24, 1963, in Miami, Florida.

== Head coaching record ==
=== Football ===
Year	Team	Overall	Conference	Standing	Bowl/playoffs
St. Thomas (Pennsylvania) Tommies (Independent) (1926–1936)
St. Thomas:		49–37–9			
Miami Hurricanes (Southern Intercollegiate Athletic Association) (1937–1941)
1937	Miami	4–4–1	1–0	T–5th	
1938	Miami	8–2	3–0	3rd	
1939	Miami	5–5	2–0	4th	
1940	Miami	3–7	2–1	T–9th	
1941	Miami	8–2	2–0	T–2nd	
Miami Hurricanes (Independent) (1942)
1942	Miami	7–2			
Miami Hurricanes (Independent) (1945–1947)
1945	Miami	9–1–1			W Orange
1946	Miami	8–2			
1947	Miami	2–7–1			
Miami:		54–32–3	10–1		
Total:		103–69–12			

== See also ==
- List of college football head coaches with non-consecutive tenure
