= List of Washington Huskies bowl games =

The Washington Huskies college football team competes as part of the NCAA Division I Football Bowl Subdivision (FBS), representing the University of Washington in the Big Ten Conference (Big Ten). Since the establishment of the team in 1889, Washington has appeared in 42 bowl games (the 1938 Poi Bowl the Huskies played in is regarded as an unsanctioned bowl game). Included in these games are 14 appearances in the Rose Bowl Game, one Bowl Championship Series (BCS) game appearance, and two College Football Playoff (CFP) berths. Through the history of the program, nine separate coaches have led the Huskies to bowl games with Don James having the most appearances with 14. With their loss in the 2024 CFP National Championship, Washington's overall bowl record stands at 21 wins, 21 losses and 1 tie (21–21–1). The Pac-8 did not allow a second bowl team from the conference until 1975.

== Key ==
General
†	Bowl game record attendance
‡	Former bowl game record attendance

Results
W	Win
L	Loss
T	Tie

== Bowl games ==
List of bowl games showing bowl played in, score, date, season, opponent, stadium, location, attendance and head coach (Note: Statistics correct as of 2010–11 NCAA football bowl games.)
#	Bowl	Score	Date	Season	Opponent	Stadium	Location	Attendance	Head coach
1	Rose Bowl	T 14–14	January 1, 1924	1923	Navy Midshipmen	Rose Bowl	Pasadena	40,000	Enoch Bagshaw
2	Rose Bowl	L 19–20	January 1, 1926	1925	Alabama Crimson Tide	Rose Bowl	Pasadena	50,000	Enoch Bagshaw
3	Rose Bowl	L 0–21	January 1, 1937	1936	Pittsburgh Panthers	Rose Bowl	Pasadena	87,196^{‡}	James Phelan
4	Poi Bowl	W 53–13	January 1, 1938	1937	Hawaii Rainbows	Honolulu Stadium	Honolulu	13,500	James Phelan
5	Rose Bowl	L 0–29	January 1, 1944	1943	USC Trojans	Rose Bowl	Pasadena	68,000	Ralph Welch
6	Rose Bowl	W 44–8	January 1, 1960	1959	Wisconsin Badgers	Rose Bowl	Pasadena	100,809	Jim Owens
7	Rose Bowl	W 17–7	January 2, 1961	1960	Minnesota Golden Gophers	Rose Bowl	Pasadena	97,314	Jim Owens
8	Rose Bowl	L 7–17	January 1, 1964	1963	Illinois Fighting Illini	Rose Bowl	Pasadena	96,957	Jim Owens
9	Rose Bowl	W 27–20	January 2, 1978	1977	Michigan Wolverines	Rose Bowl	Pasadena	105,312	Don James
10	Sun Bowl	W 14–7	December 22, 1979	1979	Texas Longhorns	Sun Bowl	El Paso	33,412	Don James
11	Rose Bowl	L 6–23	January 1, 1981	1980	Michigan Wolverines	Rose Bowl	Pasadena	105,526	Don James
12	Rose Bowl	W 28–0	January 1, 1982	1981	Iowa Hawkeyes	Rose Bowl	Pasadena	105,611	Don James
13	Aloha Bowl	W 21–20	December 25, 1982	1982	Maryland Terrapins	Aloha Stadium	Honolulu	30,055^{‡}	Don James
14	Aloha Bowl	L 10–13	December 26, 1983	1983	Penn State Nittany Lions	Aloha Stadium	Honolulu	37,212^{‡}	Don James
15	Orange Bowl	W 28–17	January 1, 1985	1984	Oklahoma Sooners	Orange Bowl	Miami	56,294	Don James
16	Freedom Bowl	W 20–17	December 30, 1985	1985	Colorado Buffaloes	Anaheim Stadium	Anaheim	30,961^{‡}	Don James
17	Sun Bowl	L 6–28	December 25, 1986	1986	Alabama Crimson Tide	Sun Bowl	El Paso	48,722	Don James
18	Independence Bowl	W 24–12	December 19, 1987	1987	Tulane Green Wave	Independence Stadium	Shreveport	41,683	Don James
19	Freedom Bowl	W 34–7	December 30, 1989	1989	Florida Gators	Anaheim Stadium	Anaheim	33,858	Don James
20	Rose Bowl	W 46–34	January 1, 1991	1990	Iowa Hawkeyes	Rose Bowl	Pasadena	101,273	Don James
21	Rose Bowl	W 34–14	January 1, 1992	1991	Michigan Wolverines	Rose Bowl	Pasadena	103,566	Don James
22	Rose Bowl	L 31–38	January 1, 1993	1992	Michigan Wolverines	Rose Bowl	Pasadena	94,236	Don James
23	Sun Bowl	L 18–38	December 29, 1995	1995	Iowa Hawkeyes	Sun Bowl	El Paso	49,116	Jim Lambright
24	Holiday Bowl	L 21–33	December 30, 1996	1996	Colorado Buffaloes	Jack Murphy Stadium (Note: Originally called Jack Murphy Stadium from 1980 to 1997, in 1998 it was renamed Qualcomm Stadium.)	San Diego	54,749	Jim Lambright
25	Aloha Bowl	W 51–23	December 25, 1997	1997	Michigan State Spartans	Aloha Stadium	Honolulu	44,598	Jim Lambright
26	Oahu Bowl	L 25–45	December 25, 1998	1998	Air Force Falcons	Aloha Stadium	Honolulu	46,451^{†}	Jim Lambright
27	Holiday Bowl	L 20–24	December 29, 1999	1999	Kansas State Wildcats	Qualcomm Stadium	San Diego	57,118	Rick Neuheisel
28	Rose Bowl (BCS)	W 34–24	January 1, 2001	2000	Purdue Boilermakers	Rose Bowl	Pasadena	94,392	Rick Neuheisel
29	Holiday Bowl	L 43–47	December 28, 2001	2001	Texas Longhorns	Qualcomm Stadium	San Diego	60,548	Rick Neuheisel
30	Sun Bowl	L 24–34	December 30, 2002	2002	Purdue Boilermakers	Sun Bowl	El Paso	48,917	Rick Neuheisel
31	Holiday Bowl	W 19–7	December 30, 2010	2010	Nebraska Cornhuskers	Qualcomm Stadium	San Diego	57,291	Steve Sarkisian
32	Alamo Bowl	L 56–67	December 29, 2011	2011	Baylor Bears	Alamodome	San Antonio	65,256	Steve Sarkisian
33	Maaco Bowl Las Vegas	L 26–28	December 22, 2012	2012	Boise State Broncos	Sam Boyd Stadium	Las Vegas	33,217	Steve Sarkisian
34	Fight Hunger Bowl	W 31–16	December 27, 2013	2013	BYU Cougars	AT&T Park	San Francisco	34,136	Marques Tuiasosopo (Interim)
35	Cactus Bowl	L 22–30	January 2, 2015	2014	Oklahoma State Cowboys	Sun Devil Stadium	Tempe	35,409	Chris Petersen
36	Heart of Dallas Bowl	W 44–31	December 26, 2015	2015	Southern Miss Golden Eagles	Cotton Bowl	Dallas	20,229	Chris Petersen
37	Peach Bowl (CFP Semifinal)	L 7–24	December 31, 2016	2016	Alabama Crimson Tide	Georgia Dome	Atlanta	75,996	Chris Petersen
38	Fiesta Bowl	L 28–35	December 30, 2017	2017	Penn State Nittany Lions	University of Phoenix Stadium	Glendale	61,842	Chris Petersen
39	Rose Bowl	L 23–28	January 1, 2019	2018	Ohio State Buckeyes	Rose Bowl	Pasadena	91,853	Chris Petersen
40	Las Vegas Bowl	W 38–7	December 21, 2019	2019	Boise State Broncos	Sam Boyd Stadium	Whitney	34,197	Chris Petersen
41	Alamo Bowl	W 27–20	December 29, 2022	2022	Texas Longhorns	Alamodome	San Antonio	62,730	Kalen DeBoer
42	Sugar Bowl (CFP Semifinal)	W 37–31	January 1, 2024	2023	Texas Longhorns	Caesars Superdome	New Orleans	68,791	Kalen DeBoer
43	CFP National Championship	L 13–34	January 8, 2024	2023	Michigan Wolverines	NRG Stadium	Houston	72,808	Kalen DeBoer
44	Sun Bowl	L 34–35	December 31, 2024	2024	Louisville Cardinals	Sun Bowl	El Paso	40,826	Jedd Fisch
45	LA Bowl	W 38–10	December 13, 2025	2025	Boise State Broncos	SoFi Stadium	Inglewood	23,269	Jedd Fisch
