= Zuehl Conoly =

American football player (1920–2001)

No. 63
- Positions: Guard, tackle

Personal information
- Born: September 13, 1920; San Antonio, Texas, U.S.
- Died: January 22, 2001 (aged 80); Kinney, Texas, U.S.
- Listed height: 6 ft 0 in (1.83 m)
- Listed weight: 227 lb (103 kg)

Career information
- High school: Roy Miller (Corpus Christi, Texas)
- College: Southwestern (TX); Texas
- NFL draft: 1943: 10th round, 82nd overall pick

Career history
- Chicago Cardinals (1946)

Awards and highlights
- 1943 Cotton Bowl Classic champion; 1944 Sun Bowl champion

Career NFL statistics
- Games played: 9
- Stats at Pro Football Reference

William Zuehl "Bud" Conoly (September 13, 1920 – January 22, 2001) was an American professional football player who was a guard for one season in the National Football League (NFL) with the Chicago Cardinals. Prior to that he played college football for the Southwestern Pirates and Texas Longhorns.

== Early life ==
Conoly played high school football at Corpus Christi High where he helped them to the 1938 State Championship (its first of only two) and was an all-star tackle in 1939.

== College career ==
Conoly played college football at Texas in 1941 and 1942, where he was a tackle. In 1941, the team went 8-1-1, spent two weeks ranked #1 and finished the season ranked #4. The next year Conoly deferred his enlistment in the Navy and the Longhorns won both the Southwest Conference Championship and the Cotton Bowl and finished ranked 11th.

In 1943, as part of his military service, he was transferred to Southwestern University where he played for the Pirates football team despite having used all of his eligibility at Texas. With other stars from Texas, like Spot Collins and Harold Fischer, he helped the team to a 10-1-1 record, the only ranking in school history and to a victory in the Sun Bowl. For his efforts he was an AP All-American Honorable Mention that year.

== Military service ==
Conoly served in the Navy during World War II.

== Professional career ==
Conoly was selected by the Philadelphia Eagles in the tenth round (82nd overall) of the 1943 NFL draft. After returning from service in World War II, he played in nine games for the Cardinals in 1946. Against the Lions that year, he blocked and recovered a punt to set up a touchdown.
