= List of USC Trojans bowl games =

The USC Trojans football team competes as part of the National Collegiate Athletic Association (NCAA) Division I Football Bowl Subdivision (FBS), representing the University of Southern California in the Big Ten Conference (B10). Since the establishment of the team in 1888, USC has appeared in 56 bowl games, with a record of 36–20. The Trojans have appeared in 34 Rose Bowls, winning 25, both records for the bowl.

== Bowl games ==
List of bowl games
#	Bowl	Score	Date	Season	Opponent	Stadium	Location	Attendance	Head coach
1	Rose Bowl	W 14–3	January 1, 1923	1922	Penn State	Rose Bowl	Pasadena, CA	43,000	Gus Henderson
2	Christmas Festival	W 20–7	December 25, 1924	1924	Missouri	Los Angeles Memorial Coliseum	Los Angeles, CA	47,000	Gus Henderson
3	Rose Bowl	W 47–14	January 1, 1930	1929	Pittsburgh	Rose Bowl	Pasadena, CA	72,000	Howard Jones
4	Rose Bowl	W 21–12	January 1, 1932	1931	Tulane	Rose Bowl	Pasadena, CA	75,562	Howard Jones
5	Rose Bowl	W 35–0	January 2, 1933	1932	Pittsburgh	Rose Bowl	Pasadena, CA	78,874	Howard Jones
6	Rose Bowl	W 7–3	January 2, 1939	1938	Duke	Rose Bowl	Pasadena, CA	89,452	Howard Jones
7	Rose Bowl	W 14–0	January 1, 1940	1939	Tennessee	Rose Bowl	Pasadena, CA	92,000	Howard Jones
8	Rose Bowl	W 39–0	January 1, 1944	1943	Washington	Rose Bowl	Pasadena, CA	68,000	Jeff Cravath
9	Rose Bowl	W 25–0	January 1, 1945	1944	Tennessee	Rose Bowl	Pasadena, CA	91,000	Jeff Cravath
10	Rose Bowl	L 14–34	January 1, 1946	1945	Alabama	Rose Bowl	Pasadena, CA	93,000	Jeff Cravath
11	Rose Bowl	L 0–49	January 1, 1948	1947	Michigan	Rose Bowl	Pasadena, CA	93,000	Jeff Cravath
12	Rose Bowl	W 7–0	January 1, 1953	1952	Wisconsin	Rose Bowl	Pasadena, CA	101,500	Jess Hill
13	Rose Bowl	L 7–20	January 1, 1955	1954	Ohio State	Rose Bowl	Pasadena, CA	89,191	Jess Hill
14	Rose Bowl	W 42–37	January 1, 1963	1962	Wisconsin	Rose Bowl	Pasadena, CA	98,698	John McKay
15	Rose Bowl	L 13–14	January 2, 1967	1966	Purdue	Rose Bowl	Pasadena, CA	100,807	John McKay
16	Rose Bowl	W 14–3	January 1, 1968	1967	Indiana	Rose Bowl	Pasadena, CA	102,946	John McKay
17	Rose Bowl	L 16–27	January 1, 1969	1968	Ohio State	Rose Bowl	Pasadena, CA	102,063	John McKay
18	Rose Bowl	W 10–3	January 1, 1970	1969	Michigan	Rose Bowl	Pasadena, CA	103,878	John McKay
19	Rose Bowl	W 42–17	January 1, 1973	1972	Ohio State	Rose Bowl	Pasadena, CA	106,869	John McKay
20	Rose Bowl	L 21–42	January 1, 1974	1973	Ohio State	Rose Bowl	Pasadena, CA	105,267	John McKay
21	Rose Bowl	W 18–17	January 1, 1975	1974	Ohio State	Rose Bowl	Pasadena, CA	106,721	John McKay
22	Liberty Bowl	W 20–0	December 22, 1975	1975	Texas A&M	Memphis Memorial Stadium	Memphis, TN	52,129	John McKay
23	Rose Bowl	W 14–6	January 1, 1977	1976	Michigan	Rose Bowl	Pasadena, CA	106,182	John Robinson
24	Bluebonnet Bowl	W 47–28	December 31, 1977	1977	Texas A&M	Astrodome	Houston, TX	52,842	John Robinson
25	Rose Bowl	W 17–10	January 1, 1979	1978	Michigan	Rose Bowl	Pasadena, CA	105,629	John Robinson
26	Rose Bowl	W 17–16	January 1, 1980	1979	Ohio State	Rose Bowl	Pasadena, CA	105,526	John Robinson
27	Fiesta Bowl	L 10–26	January 1, 1982	1981	Penn State	Sun Devil Stadium	Tempe, AZ	71,053	John Robinson
28	Rose Bowl	W 20–17	January 1, 1985	1984	Ohio State	Rose Bowl	Pasadena, CA	102,594	Ted Tollner
29	Aloha Bowl	L 3–24	December 28, 1985	1985	Alabama	Aloha Stadium	Honolulu, HI	35,183	Ted Tollner
30	Florida Citrus Bowl	L 7–16	January 1, 1987	1986	Auburn	Citrus Bowl	Gainesville, FL	51,113	Ted Tollner
31	Rose Bowl	L 20–17	January 1, 1988	1987	Michigan State	Rose Bowl	Pasadena, CA	103,847	Larry Smith
32	Rose Bowl	L 22–14	January 2, 1989	1988	Michigan	Rose Bowl	Pasadena, CA	101,688	Larry Smith
33	Rose Bowl	W 17–10	January 1, 1990	1989	Michigan	Rose Bowl	Pasadena, CA	103,450	Larry Smith
34	Sun Bowl	L 16–17	December 31, 1990	1990	Michigan State	Sun Bowl	El Paso, TX	50,562	Larry Smith
35	Freedom Bowl	L 7–24	December 29, 1992	1992	Fresno State	Anaheim Stadium	Anaheim, CA	50,745	Larry Smith
36	Freedom Bowl	W 28–21	December 30, 1993	1993	Utah	Anaheim Stadium	Anaheim, CA	37,203	John Robinson
37	Cotton Bowl Classic	W 55–14	January 2, 1995	1994	Texas Tech	Cotton Bowl	Dallas, TX	70,218	John Robinson
38	Rose Bowl	W 41–32	January 1, 1996	1995	Northwestern	Rose Bowl	Pasadena, CA	100,102	John Robinson
39	Sun Bowl	L 19–28	December 31, 1998	1998	TCU	Sun Bowl	El Paso, TX	46,612	Paul Hackett
40	Las Vegas Bowl	L 6–10	December 25, 2001	2001	Utah	Sam Boyd Stadium	Las Vegas, NV	22,385	Pete Carroll
41	Orange Bowl	W 38–17	January 2, 2003	2002	Iowa	Pro Player Stadium	Miami Gardens, FL	75,971	Pete Carroll
42	Rose Bowl	W 28–14	January 1, 2004	2003	Michigan	Rose Bowl	Pasadena, CA	93,849	Pete Carroll
43	Orange Bowl BCS National Championship Game	W 55–19	January 4, 2005	2004	Oklahoma	Dolphin Stadium	Miami Gardens, FL	77,912	Pete Carroll
44	Rose Bowl BCS National Championship Game	L 38–41	January 4, 2006	2005	Texas	Rose Bowl	Pasadena, CA	93,926	Pete Carroll
45	Rose Bowl	W 32–18	January 1, 2007	2006	Michigan	Rose Bowl	Pasadena, CA	93,852	Pete Carroll
46	Rose Bowl	W 49–17	January 1, 2008	2007	Illinois	Rose Bowl	Pasadena, CA	93,923	Pete Carroll
47	Rose Bowl	W 38–24	January 1, 2009	2008	Penn State	Rose Bowl	Pasadena, CA	93,293	Pete Carroll
48	Emerald Bowl	W 24–13	December 26, 2009	2009	Boston College	AT&T Park	San Francisco, CA	40,121	Pete Carroll
49	Sun Bowl	L 7–21	December 31, 2012	2012	Georgia Tech	Sun Bowl Stadium	El Paso, TX	47,922	Lane Kiffin
50	Las Vegas Bowl	W 45–20	December 21, 2013	2013	Fresno State	Sam Boyd Stadium	Las Vegas, NV	42,178	Clay Helton
51	Holiday Bowl	W 45–42	December 27, 2014	2014	Nebraska	Qualcomm Stadium	San Diego, CA	55,789	Steve Sarkisian
52	Holiday Bowl	L 21–23	December 30, 2015	2015	Wisconsin	Qualcomm Stadium	San Diego, CA	48,329	Clay Helton
53	Rose Bowl	W 52–49	January 2, 2017	2016	Penn State	Rose Bowl	Pasadena, CA	95,128	Clay Helton
54	Cotton Bowl Classic	L 7–24	December 29, 2017	2017	Ohio State	AT&T Stadium	Arlington, TX	67,510	Clay Helton
55	Holiday Bowl	L 24–49	December 27, 2019	2019	Iowa	SDCCU Stadium	San Diego, CA	50,123	Clay Helton
56	Cotton Bowl Classic	L 45–46	January 2, 2023	2022	Tulane	AT&T Stadium	Arlington, TX	55,329	Lincoln Riley
57	Holiday Bowl	W 42–28	December 27, 2023	2023	Louisville	Petco Park	San Diego, CA	35,317	Lincoln Riley
58	Las Vegas Bowl	W 35–31	December 27, 2024	2024	Texas A&M	Allegiant Stadium	Las Vegas, NV	26,671	Lincoln Riley
59	Alamo Bowl	L 27-30 (OT)	December 30, 2025	2025	TCU	Alamodome	San Antonio, TX	54,751	Lincoln Riley
