= Randolph M. Medley =

American sports coach and college athletics administrator

Biographical details
- Born: September 22, 1898; Rush Hill, Missouri, U.S.
- Died: September 30, 1979 (aged 81); Georgetown, Texas, U.S.

Coaching career (HC unless noted)

Football
- 1923–1938: McMurry
- 1939–1947: Southwestern (TX)
- 1950: Southwestern (TX)

Basketball
- 1923–1939: McMurry
- 1939–1943: Southwestern (TX)
- 1945–1948: Southwestern (TX)
- 1951–1958: Southwestern (TX)

Baseball
- 1951–1958: Southwestern (TX)

Administrative career (AD unless noted)
- 1939–?: Southwestern (TX)

Head coaching record
- Overall: 111–104–24 (football); 206–212 (basketball)
- Bowls: 2–0

Accomplishments and honors

Championships
- Football; 1 TIAA (1927); 1 Texas Conference (1946)

Randolph Marmaduke "Med" Medley (September 22, 1898 – September 30, 1979) was an American football, basketball, and baseball coach and college athletics administrator. He served as the head football coach at McMurry University in Abilene, Texas from 1923 to 1938 and at Southwestern University in Georgetown, Texas from 1939 to 1947 and again in 1950, compiling a career college football record of 111–104–24. Medley was also the head basketball coach at McMurry from 1923 to 1939 and at Southwestern from 1939 to 1947 and again from 1951 to 1958, tallying a career college basketball mark of 206–212. He was the head baseball coach at Southwestern from 1951 to 1958.

== Head coaching record ==
=== Football ===
Year	Team	Overall	Conference	Standing	Bowl/playoffs
McMurry Indians (Independent) (1923–1925)
1923	McMurry	2–3–1			
1924	McMurry	5–2–1			
1925	McMurry	3–4–2			
McMurry Indians (Texas Intercollegiate Athletic Association) (1926–1932)
1926	McMurry	1–9	1–2	6th	
1927	McMurry	4–1–2	3–0–2	1st	
1928	McMurry	6–3	4–1	T–2nd	
1929	McMurry	4–1–3	3–1–1	3rd	
1930	McMurry	3–4–2	3–2–1	5th	
1931	McMurry	2–6	2–2	T–3rd (Western)	
1932	McMurry	2–4–2	2–3	4th	
McMurry Indians (Texas Conference) (1933–1938)
1933	McMurry	4–4–2	3–2	T–3rd	
1934	McMurry	3–3–3	2–1–3	4th	
1935	McMurry	6–3	4–2	2nd	
1936	McMurry	8–1–1	5–1–1	3rd	
1937	McMurry	7–2–1	5–2	3rd	
1938	McMurry	1–8	1–6	9th	
McMurry:		61–58–20	38–23–8		
Southwestern Pirates (Texas Conference) (1939–1947)
1939	Southwestern	3–5	3–3	T–5th	
1940	Southwestern	5–6	2–5	6th	
1941	Southwestern	4–4–1	3–3–1	4th	
1942	Southwestern	6–4	2–2	3rd	
1943	Southwestern	10–1–1			W Sun
1944	Southwestern	7–5			W Sun
1945	Southwestern	2–6–1			
1946	Southwestern	5–4–1	3–0–1	T–1st	
1947	Southwestern	3–6	0–5	6th	
Southwestern Pirates (Texas Conference) (1950)
1950	Southwestern	5–5	2–3	T–3rd	
Southwestern:		50–46–4			
Total:		111–104–24			
National championship Conference title Conference division title or championship game berth
