= Jeff Cravath =

American football player and coach (1903–1953)

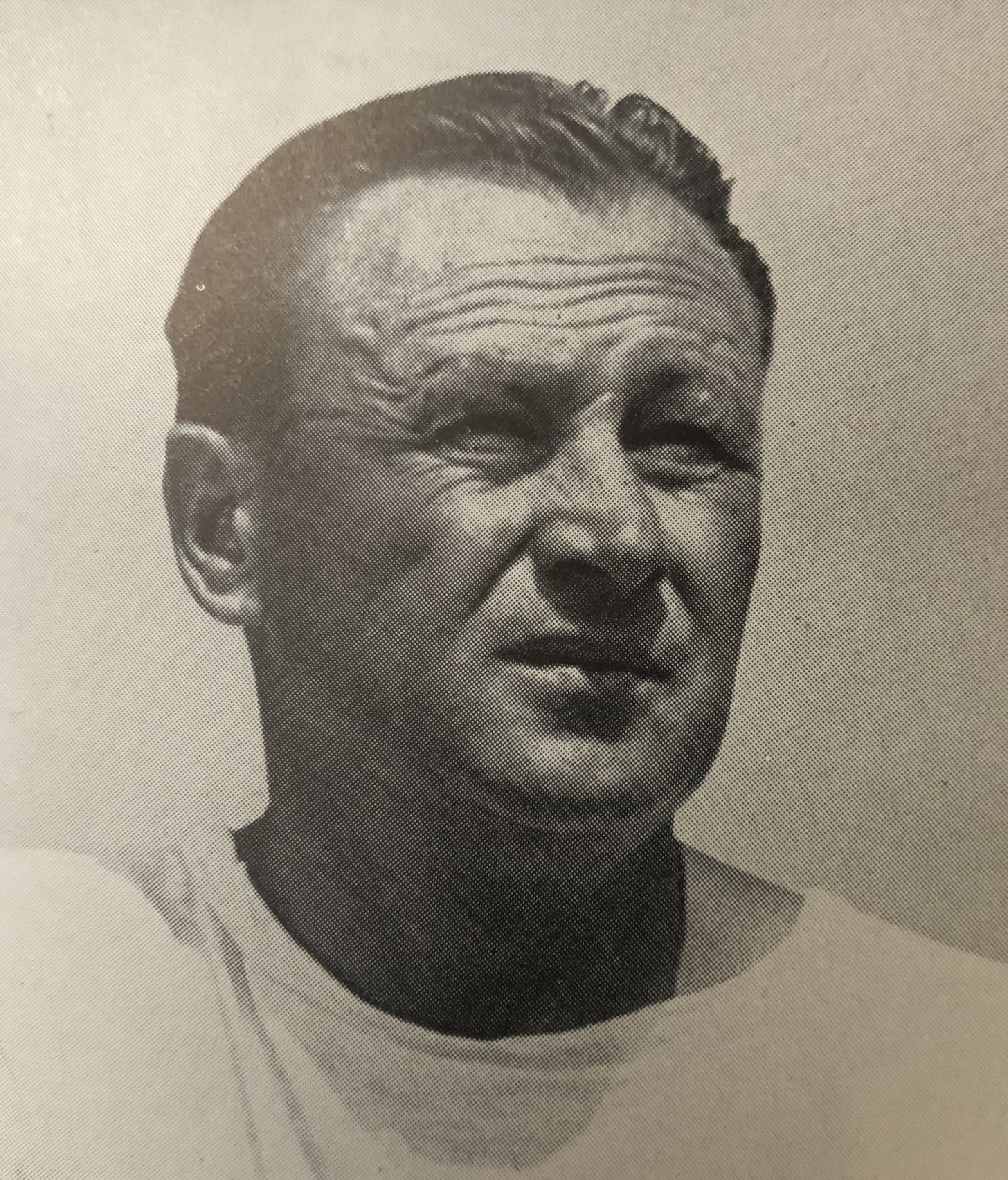
- Cravath, c. 1949

Biographical details
- Born: February 3, 1903; Breckenridge, Colorado, U.S.
- Died: December 10, 1953 (aged 50); Calexico, California, U.S.

Playing career
- 1924–1926: USC

Coaching career (HC unless noted)
- 1927–1928: USC (assistant)
- 1929–1931: Denver
- 1932: Chaffey (assistant)
- 1933–1940: USC (assistant)
- 1941: San Francisco
- 1942–1950: USC

Head coaching record
- Overall: 74–43–9
- Bowls: 2–2

Accomplishments and honors

Championships
- 4 PCC (1943–1945, 1947)

Awards
- Second-team All-American (1926); Third-team All-American (1925); 2× First-team All-PCC (1925, 1926)

Newell "Jeff" Cravath (February 3, 1903 – December 10, 1953) was an American football player and coach. He served as the head football coach the University of Denver from 1929 to 1931, at the University of San Francisco in 1941, and at the University of Southern California (USC) from 1942 to 1950, compiling a career college football record of 74–43–9. In nine seasons under Cravath, the USC Trojans football team compiled a 54–28–8 record, won four Pacific Coast Conference titles, and made four appearances in the Rose Bowl Game. Cravath introduced the T formation to the USC program.

== Early life ==
Cravath was born in Breckenridge, Colorado. His mother died in childbirth and his father died when he was six. Cravath was raised by his maternal grandparents, Augustus K. and Kate Sikes Cravath, of Santa Ana, California, as well as his uncle, Major League Baseball outfielder Gavvy Cravath, and grandparents in Kansas. Jeff was a nickname given to him when he was very young as he was a "fighter" like James J. Jeffries. He was called "little Jeffries".

== Playing career ==
Cravath graduated from Santa Ana High School in Santa Ana, California, and entered the University of Southern California, starring as a center on the football team from 1924 to 1926. Among his teammates were John Wayne and Ward Bond. Cravath also became a Sigma Chi member at USC. In his senior year, in which he was team captain, USC began its intersectional rivalry with Notre Dame. The team finished 8–2, with losses to Stanford and Notre Dame both coming by 13–12 scores. All-American teammate Jesse Hibbs later noted, "I played with Jeff the year we opened the series against Notre Dame. He should have been made All-America center. That year the Notre Dame center [Bud Boeringer] made the team and Jeff completely outplayed him. He was a champ on and off the field." Cravath went on to play in the January 1927 East–West Shrine Game.

== Coaching career ==
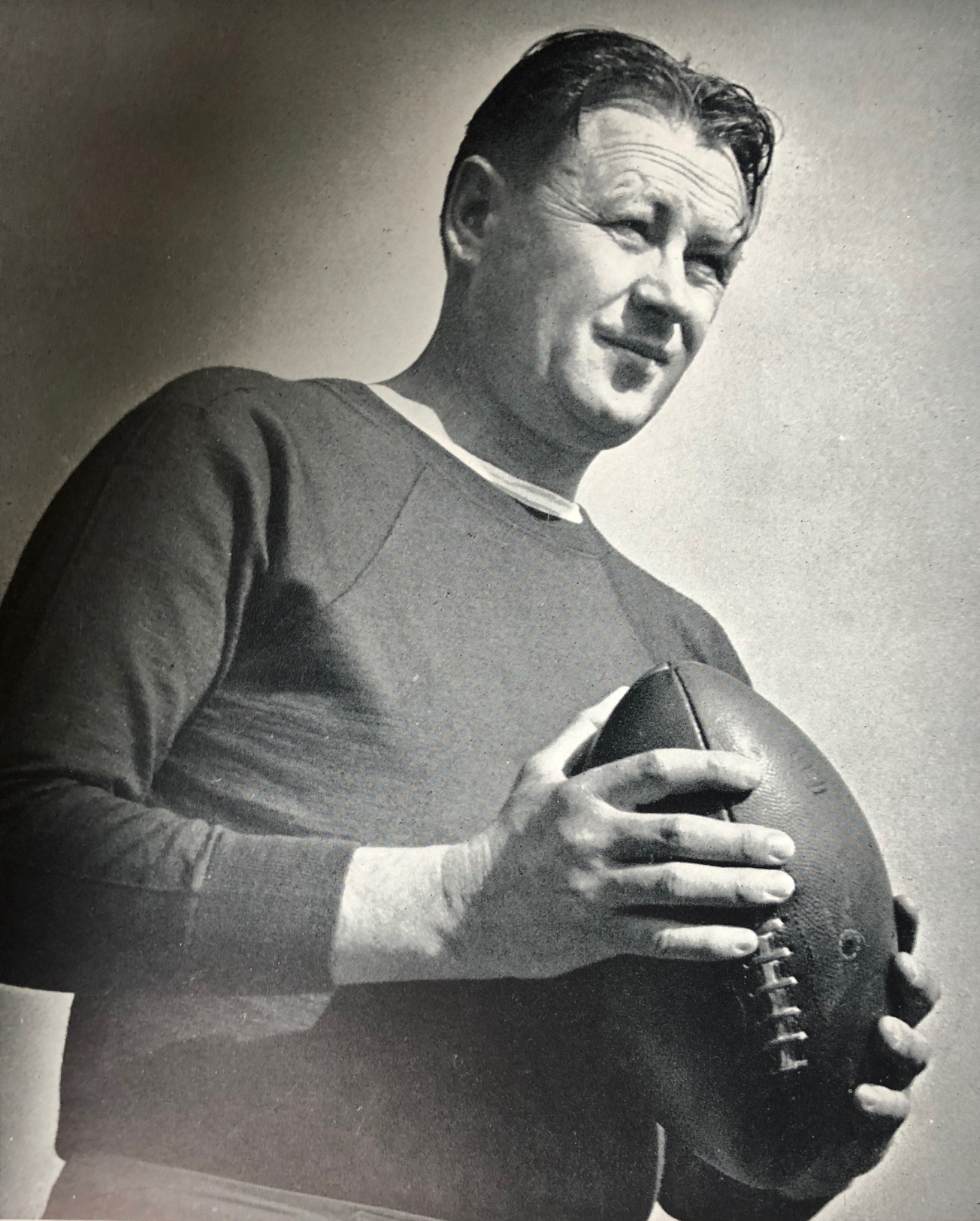
Cravath c. 1945

Cravath served as an assistant coach under Howard Jones in 1927 and 1928. The 1928 team won a national championship. Cravath next became the head coach at the University of Denver from 1929 to 1931, with a record of 11–9–1, and then served one year as an assistant at Chaffey College. He returned to USC as an assistant coach from 1933 to 1940, including the 1939 national championship team on which he was the line coach, and was head coach at the University of San Francisco for one year in 1941, with a record of 6–4. Jones died in July 1941, with assistant Sam Barry taking over the USC team for that season; but when World War II began and Barry entered the Navy, he recommended Cravath for the position on a permanent basis; Barry returned as an assistant from 1945 to 1950. The new coach, rejected for military service due to poor eyesight, became the first USC alumnus to lead the program.

In nine seasons Cravath led USC to the Rose Bowl four times, after the 1943, 1944, 1945 and 1947 campaigns. The Trojans defeated Washington, 29–0, in the 1944 Rose Bowl and Tennessee, 25–0, in the 1945 game, but lost to Alabama in 1946 and to Michigan in 1948—USC's first losses in the Rose Bowl after eight victories. Known for their excellent defense, Cravath's 1943 team began the year with six consecutive shutouts, and his undefeated 1944 team ended the season ranked seventh in the nation. After the 1945 season, Cravath was offered a five-year contract by Washington Redskins owner George Preston Marshall, and he told acquaintances he was going to accept, but he ultimately changed his mind and signed a five-year extension with USC. He signed another four-year extension in August 1949.

Cravath's players at USC included Ralph Heywood, Jim Hardy, John Ferraro, Paul Cleary, and Frank Gifford. His later teams showed a sharp decline in performance from those of the war years. USC was 11–11–4 from the third game of 1948 through 1950. His final game was a 9–7 victory over Notre Dame, his first win in six tries against USC's major rival, and also USC's 300th victory all-time. Although he had a record of 8–3–1 against crosstown rival UCLA. The three losses were the first for USC in the series, including a 39–0 defeat in the second to last game of 1950. Cravath was also criticized for losing his last three games against California, each by six points. He was forced to resign when the 1950 season ended with a 2–5–2 mark after beginning the year ranked 12th in the nation. He was succeeded by former USC player Jess Hill, who was an assistant under Cravath from 1946 to 1948.

== After football ==
Following his coaching career, Cravath became a racing official at Santa Anita Park for two winters before moving to El Centro, California, and becoming a rancher. He also served as a technical advisor on the 1953 football film Trouble Along the Way, starring his old teammate John Wayne. Cravath died in Calexico, California, at the age of 50, one day after suffering numerous injuries when his pickup truck collided with a dump truck; he underwent an emergency tracheotomy but never regained consciousness. He was survived by his wife, Margaret "Peggy" Colegrove (1907–2010), and their two daughters, Anne (born 1930) and Carol (born 1933).

Sportswriter Braven Dyer noted, "For a man who was orphaned early in life, he grew out of rough surroundings to a point where he seemed always to know the right thing to say in public. I have known Cravath for something like 30 years. In many ways there was no better sport in the football coaching ranks than Cravath." Jim Hardy said, "I would go to Cravath for advice where I would not even have gone to my family. He was a friend of all his players and a good coach. He was subjected to unreasonable pressure in his last year at SC, but he never lost his interest in the game and his deep attachment to the men who played for him." Cravath was a 2005 inductee to the USC Athletic Hall of Fame.

== Head coaching record ==
Year	Team	Overall	Conference	Standing	Bowl/playoffs	AP^{#}
Denver Pioneers (Rocky Mountain Conference) (1929–1931)
1929	Denver	5–1–1	4–1–1	T–2nd		
1930	Denver	5–4	4–3	4th		
1931	Denver	4–6	3–5	8th		
Denver:		14–11–1	11–9–1			
San Francisco Dons (Independent) (1941)
1941	San Francisco	6–4				
San Francisco:		6–4				
USC Trojans (Pacific Coast Conference) (1942–1950)
1942	USC	5–5–1	4–2–1	4th		
1943	USC	8–2	5–0	1st	W Rose	
1944	USC	8–0–2	3–0–2	1st	W Rose	7
1945	USC	7–4	5–1	1st	L Rose	11
1946	USC	6–4	5–2	3rd		
1947	USC	7–2–1	6–0	1st	L Rose	8
1948	USC	6–3–1	4–2	3rd		
1949	USC	5–3–1	4–2	T–3rd		
1950	USC	2–5–2	1–3–2	7th		
USC:		54–28–8	37–12–5			
Total:		74–43–9				
National championship Conference title Conference division title or championship game berth
^{#}Rankings from final AP Poll.
