= 1943 Southwestern Pirates football team =

American college football season

1943 Southwestern Pirates football

Sun Bowl, W 7–0 vs. New Mexico
- Conference: Texas Conference
- Record: 10–1–1 (0–0 Texas)
- Head coach: Randolph M. Medley (5th season)
- Captain: Spot Collins
- Home stadium: Snyder Field

The 1943 Southwestern Pirates football team represented Southwestern University during the 1943 college football season. In Randolph M. Medley's fifth season at Southwestern, the Pirates compiled a 10–1–1 record, shut out six teams, and outscored their opponents by a total of 266 to 59. The Pirates defeated many notable teams during the season, including Texas in Austin, Rice in Houston, and New Mexico in the Sun Bowl, Southwestern's first bowl game. The Pirates tied their only ranked opponent, No. 13 Tulsa, and were themselves ranked. for the first and only season in program history, for a few weeks in October.

== Schedule ==
Date	Time	Opponent	Rank	Site	Result	Attendance	Source
September 15		at North Texas Aggies		Farrington Field; Fort Worth, TX	W 20–0	12,000	
September 25	4:30 p.m.	at Ward Island Marines		Buccaneer Stadium; Corpus Christi, TX	W 54–0	5,000	
October 2		at Texas		War Memorial Stadium; Austin, TX	W 14–7		
October 9	8:00 p.m.	at South Plains AAF	No. 11	Tech Field; Lubbock, TX	W 40–0	4,500	
October 15		vs. North Texas Aggies	No. 17	House Park; Austin, TX	W 26–0		
October 23		vs. Southwestern Louisiana	No. 12	Rice Field; Houston, TX	L 6–27		
October 30		at No. 13 Tulsa		Skelly Field; Tulsa, OK	T 6–6	10,000	
November 6	8:00 p.m.	Bryan AAF		Snyder Field; Georgetown, TX	W 20–6		
November 13		at Abilene AAF		Abilene, TX	W 45–6	4,500	
November 20	2:30 p.m.	vs. Arkansas A&M		Louisiana State Fair Stadium; Shreveport, LA	W 7–0	4,500	
November 27		at Rice		Rice Field; Houston, TX	W 21–7	4,000	
January 1, 1944		vs. New Mexico		Kidd Field; El Paso, TX (Sun Bowl)	W 7–0	18,000	
Rankings from AP Poll released prior to the game; All times are in Central time

== Rankings ==
Ranking movements Legend: ██ Increase in ranking ██ Decrease in ranking — = Not ranked
	Week								
Poll	1	2	3	4	5	6	7	8	Final
AP	11	17	12	—	—	—	—	—	—
