= Ralph Welch =

American football player and coach (1907–1974)

- Welch from 1947 Tyee yearbook

Biographical details
- Born: January 13, 1907; Collinsville, Texas, U.S.
- Died: September 15, 1974 (aged 67); Seattle, Washington, U.S.

Playing career
- 1927–1929: Purdue
- Position: Halfback

Coaching career (HC unless noted)
- 1930–1937: Washington (assistant)
- 1939–1941: Washington (assistant)
- 1942–1947: Washington

Head coaching record
- Overall: 27–20–3
- Bowls: 0–1

Accomplishments and honors

Awards
- Consensus All-American (1929); 2× First-team All-Big Ten (1928, 1929)

W. Ralph "Pest" Welch (January 13, 1907 – September 15, 1974) was an American football player and coach. He served as the head coach at the University of Washington from 1942 to 1947, compiling a record of 27–20–3. Welch led his 1943 Washington squad to the Rose Bowl, where they lost to USC, 29–0. He played college football at Purdue University as a halfback under head coach James Phelan, whom he followed to Washington as an assistant in 1930.

When Washington athletic director Ray Eckmann removed Phelan after the 1941 season, he selected Welch to replace him. Popular with the players, Welch wielded a reputation as a great scout of talent. Eckmann retained Welch on a year-to-year basis with an initial $9,000 per season salary, matching Phelan's final salary.

Welch died on September 15, 1974, at University Hospital in Seattle, Washington.

== Head coaching record ==
Year	Team	Overall	Conference	Standing	Bowl/playoffs	AP^{#}
Washington Huskies (Pacific Coast Conference) (1942–1947)
1942	Washington	4–3–3	3–3–2	6th		
1943	Washington	4–1	0–1	3rd	L Rose	12
1944	Washington	5–3	1–1	2nd		
1945	Washington	6–3	6–3	3rd		
1946	Washington	5–4	5–3	4th		
1947	Washington	3–6	2–5	T–7th		
Washington:		27–20–3	17–16–2			
Total:		27–20–3				
^{#}Rankings from final AP Poll.
