= 1943 New Mexico A&M Aggies football team =

American college football season

1943 New Mexico A&M Aggies football
- Conference: Independent
- Record: 4–0
- Head coach: Maurice Moulder (1st season)
- Home stadium: Quesenberry Field

1943 Western college football independents records
	Conf.			Overall
Team	W	L	T	W		L		T
No. 18 Colorado College		–		7	–	0	–	0
New Mexico A&M		–		4	–	0	–	0
No. 19 Pacific (CA)		–		7	–	2	–	0
Nevada		–		4	–	1	–	1
New Mexico		–		3	–	2	–	0
Arizona State–Flagstaff		–		1	–	1	–	0
Saint Mary's		–		2	–	5	–	0
San Francisco		–		1	–	7	–	0
Rankings from AP Poll

The 1943 New Mexico A&M Aggies football team was an American football team that represented New Mexico College of Agriculture and Mechanical Arts (now known as New Mexico State University) as an independent during the 1943 college football season. The team was drawn from the Army Specialized Training Program (ASTP) and was sometimes referred to as the ASTP Aggies. In their first year under head coach Maurice Moulder, the Aggies compiled a 4–0 record and outscored opponents by a total of 166 to 75. The team played home games at Quesenberry Field in Las Cruces, New Mexico.

== Schedule ==
Date	Opponent	Site	Result	Source
November 13	El Paso All-Stars	Quesenberry Field; Las Cruces, NM	W 32–6	
November 20	Fort Bliss Commandos	Quesenberry Field; Las Cruces, NM	W 21–14	
November 25	51st Hospital, Fort Bliss	Quesenberry Field; Las Cruces, NM	W 27–0	
December 5	at 51st Hospital, Fort Bliss	Austin HS Stadium; El Paso, TX	W 27–0	
