= 1943 Pacific Tigers football team =

American college football season

1943 Pacific Tigers football
- Conference: Independent

Ranking
- AP: No. 19
- Record: 7–2
- Head coach: Amos Alonzo Stagg (11th season)
- Home stadium: Baxter Stadium

1943 Western college football independents records
	Conf.			Overall
Team	W	L	T	W		L		T
No. 18 Colorado College		–		7	–	0	–	0
New Mexico A&M		–		4	–	0	–	0
No. 19 Pacific (CA)		–		7	–	2	–	0
Nevada		–		4	–	1	–	1
New Mexico		–		3	–	2	–	0
Arizona State–Flagstaff		–		1	–	1	–	0
Saint Mary's		–		2	–	5	–	0
San Francisco		–		1	–	7	–	0
Rankings from AP Poll

The 1943 Pacific Tigers football team was an American football team that represented the College of the Pacific—now known as the University of the Pacific—in Stockton, California as an independent during the 1943 college football season. In their 11th season under head coach Amos Alonzo Stagg, the Tigers compiled a record of 7–2 and finished the season ranked No. 19 in the AP Poll.

In the final Litkenhous Ratings, Pacific ranked 31st among the nation's college and service teams with a rating of 90.6.

The Tigers played home games at Baxter Stadium in Stockton.

== Schedule ==
Date	Opponent	Rank	Site	Result	Attendance	Source
September 18	at Alameda Coast Guard		San Francisco, CA	W 14–7	10,000	
September 25	St. Mary's Pre-Flight		Baxter Stadium; Stockton, CA	W 13–7		
October 2	at UCLA		Los Angeles Memorial Coliseum; Los Angeles, CA	W 19–7	22,000	
October 9	at California	No. 20	California Memorial Stadium; Berkeley, CA	W 12–6	20,000	
October 16	No. 11 Del Monte Pre-Flight	No. 10	Baxter Stadium; Stockton, CA	W 16–7	10,000	
October 23	at No. 7 USC	No. 6	Los Angeles Memorial Coliseum; Los Angeles, CA	L 0–6	75,000	
November 6	Saint Mary's	No. 10	Baxter Stadium; Stockton, CA	W 19–7		
November 13	vs. Yuma Field	No. 11	Ratcliffe Stadium; Fresno, CA	W 43–0	5,000	
December 11	vs. No. 9 March Field		Los Angeles Memorial Coliseum; Los Angeles, CA	L 10–19	7,500	
Rankings from AP Poll released prior to the game; Source:

== Rankings ==
Ranking movements Legend: ██ Increase in ranking ██ Decrease in ranking — = Not ranked ( ) = First-place votes
	Week								
Poll	1	2	3	4	5	6	7	8	Final
AP	20	10	6 (4)	10	10	11	13	—	19
