= 1943 Colorado College Tigers football team =

American college football season

1943 Colorado College Tigers football
- Conference: Rocky Mountain Conference

Ranking
- AP: No. 18
- Record: 7–0 (0–0 RMC)
- Head coach: Harold A. White (2nd season)
- Home stadium: Washburn Field

1943 Western college football independents records
	Conf.			Overall
Team	W	L	T	W		L		T
No. 18 Colorado College		–		7	–	0	–	0
New Mexico A&M		–		4	–	0	–	0
No. 19 Pacific (CA)		–		7	–	2	–	0
Nevada		–		4	–	1	–	1
New Mexico		–		3	–	2	–	0
Arizona State–Flagstaff		–		1	–	1	–	0
Saint Mary's		–		2	–	5	–	0
San Francisco		–		1	–	7	–	0
Rankings from AP Poll

The 1943 Colorado College Tigers football team was an American football team represented Colorado College as a member of the Rocky Mountain Conference (RMC) during the 1943 college football season. In the war-torn 1943 season, the Tigers compiled a perfect 7–0 record, and outscored their opponents by a total of 199 to 27. Although they were only ranked once going into a contest, the Tigers were ranked on the AP poll for six weeks, rising to as high as 16th and finishing at 18th in the final poll.

In the final Litkenhous Ratings, Colorado College ranked 33rd among the nation's college and service teams with a rating of 90.2.

== Schedule ==
Date	Opponent	Rank	Site	Result	Attendance	Source
September 18	Lowry Field*		Washburn Field; Colorado Springs, CO	W 32–14	4,500	
September 25	New Mexico*		Washburn Field; Colorado Springs, CO	W 20–7		
October 8	at Denver*		DU Stadium; Denver, CO	W 41–0		
October 16	Kirtland Field*		Washburn Field; Colorado Springs, CO	W 20–0		
October 23	at Colorado*	No. 18	Colorado Stadium; Boulder, CO	W 16–6		
November 13	at Utah*		Ute Stadium; Salt Lake City, UT	W 64–0		
November 20	Colorado*		Washburn Field; Colorado Springs, CO	W 6–0		
*Non-conference game; Rankings from AP Poll released prior to the game

== Rankings ==
Ranking movements Legend: ██ Increase in ranking ██ Decrease in ranking — = Not ranked т = Tied with team above or below ( ) = First-place votes
	Week								
Poll	1	2	3	4	5	6	7	8	Final
AP	—	—	18	16	17т	—	—	17 (2)	18 (2)
