= 1943 Utah Utes football team =

American college football season

1943 Utah Utes football
- Conference: Mountain States Conference
- Record: 0–7 (0–2 MSC)
- Head coach: Ike Armstrong (19th season)
- Home stadium: Ute Stadium

1943 Mountain States Conference football standings
	Conf.					Overall
Team	W		L		T	W		L		T
Colorado $	2	–	0	–	0	5	–	2	–	0
Utah	0	–	2	–	0	0	–	7	–	0
Denver	0	–	0	–	0	2	–	5	–	0
$ – Conference champion

The 1943 Utah Utes football team, also commonly known as the Utah Redskins, was an American football team that represented the University of Utah as a member of the Mountain States Conference (MSC) during the 1943 college football season. In their 19th season under head coach Ike Armstrong, the Utes compiled an overall record of 0–7 with a mark of 0–2 against conference opponents.

Utah considered cancelling football in 1943 due to World War II. College enrollment dropped significantly as many college-aged men enlisted in the armed services. LeRoy E. Cowles, President of the University of Utah, asked that the team continue to play. Armstrong supported Cowles despite having a severe shortage of players. Among MSC members, only Colorado, Denver, and Utah fielded a football team in 1943. To play a semblance of a full schedule, Utah played Colorado twice and resorted to playing enlisted men from Fort Warren, Wyoming. Utah has its first winless season since going 0–1 in 1895.

In the final Litkenhous Ratings, Utah ranked 198th among the nation's college and service teams with a rating of 38.0.

== Schedule ==
Date	Time	Opponent	Site	Result	Attendance	Source
October 2	3:00 p.m.	Fort Warren*	Ute Stadium; Salt Lake City, UT	L 0–60	8,000	
October 9		at Colorado	Colorado Stadium; Boulder, CO (rivalry)	L 0–35		
October 16		Nevada*	Ute Stadium; Salt Lake City, UT	L 19–27	4,846	
October 23		at Tulsa*	Skelly Field; Tulsa, OK	L 0–55	6,000	
November 6		Colorado^{†}	Ute Stadium; Salt Lake City, UT	L 19–22	4,500	
November 13		at Colorado College*	Washburn Field; Colorado Springs, CO	L 0–64		
November 25		Saint Mary's*	Ute Stadium; Salt Lake City, UT	L 0–34	9,000	
*Non-conference game; ^{†}Homecoming; All times are in Mountain time

== NFL draft ==
Utah had two players selected in the 1944 NFL draft.

Player	Position	Round	Pick	NFL team
George Betteridge	Back	4	30	Detroit Lions
Nick Pappas	Tackle	27	281	Washington Redskins
