= 1943 Arizona State–Flagstaff Lumberjacks football team =

American college football season

1943 Arizona State–Flagstaff Lumberjacks football
- Conference: Independent
- Record: 1–1
- Head coach: Frank Brickey (1st season)
- Home stadium: Skidmore Field

1943 Western college football independents records
	Conf.			Overall
Team	W	L	T	W		L		T
No. 18 Colorado College		–		7	–	0	–	0
New Mexico A&M		–		4	–	0	–	0
No. 19 Pacific (CA)		–		7	–	2	–	0
Nevada		–		4	–	1	–	1
New Mexico		–		3	–	2	–	0
Arizona State–Flagstaff		–		1	–	1	–	0
Saint Mary's		–		2	–	5	–	0
San Francisco		–		1	–	7	–	0
Rankings from AP Poll

The 1943 Arizona State–Flagstaff Lumberjacks football team represented Arizona State Teachers College at Flagstaff (now known as Northern Arizona University) as an independent during the 1943 college football season. Led by first-year head coach Frank Brickey, the Lumberjacks compiled an overall record of 1–1, with a conference record of 0–1.

In the final Litkenhous Ratings, Arizona State–Flagstaff ranked 172nd among the nation's college and service teams with a rating of 48.5.

== Schedule ==
Date	Opponent	Site	Result	Attendance	Source
October 10	Yuma Army Air Field	Skidmore Field; Flagstaff, AZ	W 25–0		
October 16	at New Mexico	Hilltop Stadium; Albuquerque, NM	L 6–21	6,000	
October 23	Kirtland Field	Skidmore Field; Flagstaff, AZ	Canceled		
