= 1943 Saint Mary's Pre-Flight Air Devils football team =

American college football season

1943 Saint Mary's Pre-Flight Air Devils football
- Conference: Independent
- Record: 3–4–1
- Head coach: Spike Nelson (1st season)
- Home stadium: Kezar Stadium

1943 military service football records
	Conf.			Overall
Team	W	L	T	W		L		T
No. 17 Bainbridge		–		7	–	0	–	0
Bunker Hill NAS		–		6	–	0	–	0
Greensboro		–		4	–	0	–	0
Memphis NATTC		–		2	–	0	–	0
No. 2 Iowa Pre-Flight		–		9	–	1	–	0
No. 10 March Field		–		9	–	1	–	0
No. 8 Del Monte Pre-Flight		–		7	–	1	–	0
Randolph Field		–		9	–	1	–	1
Georgia Pre-Flight		–		5	–	1	–	0
No. 6 Great Lakes Navy		–		10	–	2	–	0
Lubbock AAF		–		5	–	1	–	0
Ottumwa NAS		–		5	–	1	–	0
Camp Davis		–		8	–	2	–	0
Sampson NTS		–		7	–	2	–	0
San Diego NTS		–		7	–	2	–	0
Keesler Field		–		3	–	1	–	0
Wright Field		–		1	–	0	–	1
Camp Lejeune		–		6	–	2	–	1
Fort Riley		–		6	–	2	–	1
Kearns Field		–		5	–	2	–	0
Fort Knox		–		4	–	2	–	0
Cherry Point Marines		–		4	–	2	–	1
Alameda Coast Guard		–		4	–	2	–	1
Fort Douglas		–		4	–	2	–	1
300th Infantry		–		5	–	3	–	0
176th Infantry		–		4	–	3	–	0
Blackland AAF		–		4	–	3	–	0
Fort Sheridan		–		4	–	3	–	0
Fort Warren		–		4	–	3	–	0
Norman NAS		–		4	–	3	–	0
Charleston Coast Guard		–		5	–	4	–	0
Salt Lake AAB		–		4	–	3	–	2
124th Infantry		–		2	–	2	–	0
Camp Kilmer		–		2	–	2	–	0
Camp Lee		–		5	–	5	–	0
Logan Navy		–		2	–	2	–	0
Spokane Air Service		–		2	–	2	–	0
Camp Edwards		–		4	–	5	–	0
Curtis Bay Coast Guard		–		4	–	5	–	0
Saint Mary's Pre-Flight		–		3	–	4	–	1
Jacksonville NATTC		–		3	–	4	–	0
Richmond AAB		–		4	–	6	–	1
Atlantic City NAS		–		2	–	3	–	0
North Carolina Pre-Flight		–		2	–	4	–	1
Patterson Field		–		2	–	4	–	1
Bowman Field		–		2	–	4	–	0
Kirtland Field		–		1	–	2	–	0
Lakehurst NAS		–		2	–	4	–	0
Camp Grant		–		2	–	6	–	2
Lowry Field		–		1	–	3	–	0
Fort Monroe		–		3	–	7	–	0
Daniel Field		–		2	–	7	–	0
Camp Gordon		–		1	–	4	–	0
South Plains AAF		–		1	–	4	–	0
Greenville AAB		–		1	–	5	–	0
Ward Island Marines		–		1	–	5	–	0
Bryan AAF		–		1	–	6	–	0
Pocatello AAB		–		0	–	3	–	0
Norfolk Fleet Marines		–		0	–	9	–	0
Rankings from AP Poll

The 1943 Saint Mary's Pre-Flight Air Devils football team was an American football team that represented the United States Navy pre-flight school at Saint Mary's College of California during the 1943 college football season. The team compiled a 3–4–1 record. Spike Nelson was the head coach. The team included 1941 Heisman Trophy winner Bruce Smith.

In the final Litkenhous Ratings, Saint Mary's Pre-Flight ranked 32nd among the nation's college and service teams with a rating of 90.5.

== Schedule ==
Date	Opponent	Site	Result	Attendance	Source
September 25	at Pacific (CA)	Baxter Stadium; Stockton, CA	L 7–13		
October 2	Pleasanton Naval Distribution Center	Moraga, CA	W 48–0	1,500	
October 9	at USC	Los Angeles Memorial Coliseum; Los Angeles, CA	L 0–13	30,000	
October 23	at California	California Memorial Stadium; Berkeley, CA	W 39–0		
October 30	March Field	Kezar Stadium; San Francisco, CA	L 6–7	25,000	
November 7	vs. Alameda Coast Guard	Kezar Stadium; San Francisco, CA	T 13–13	20,000	
November 14	vs. San Francisco	Kezar Stadium; San Francisco, CA	W 41–0	5,000	
November 21	Del Monte Pre-Flight	Kezar Stadium; San Francisco, CA	L 14–37	45,000	
