= 1944 Rose Bowl =

American college football game

- 30th edition
Washington Huskies	USC Trojans
(4–0)	(7–2)
PCC	PCC
0	29
Head coach: Ralph Welch	Head coach: Jeff Cravath
AP 12
	1	2	3	4	Total
Washington	0	0	0	0	0
USC	0	7	13	9	29
- Date: January 1, 1944
- Season: 1943
- Stadium: Rose Bowl
- Location: Pasadena, California
- Player of the Game: Norman Verry (G) – USC
- Favorite: Washington: 5 to 2 odds
- Referee: T.M. Fitzpatrick (PCC)
- Attendance: 68,000

The 1944 Rose Bowl was the thirtieth edition of the college football bowl game, played at the Rose Bowl in Pasadena, California, on Saturday, January 1. This was the first Rose Bowl game featuring teams from the same conference (Pacific Coast), with the only other occurrence taking place during the 2025 game. This was due to the travel restrictions imposed by the war effort. It determined the champion of the PCC for the 1943 season, and the USC Trojans shut out the Washington Huskies 29–0 in a one-sided game.

USC backup quarterback Jim Hardy threw three touchdown passes to lead the Trojans to their seventh Rose Bowl victory and eighth PCC championship.

For the first time, the Rose Bowl was broadcast on the radio abroad to all American servicemen, with General Eisenhower in Western Europe allowing all troops who were not on the front lines to tune in and listen.

== Teams ==
=== Washington Huskies ===
Favored Washington won all four of its games in an abbreviated season without any PCC matchups, as the other five programs in the Northern Division were on hiatus in 1943 (and 1944). They played Whitman College, Spokane Air Command (twice), and the March Field Flyers. The Rose Bowl was the Huskies' sole conference game of the season; the three teams of the Southern Division (USC, UCLA and California) played each other twice; Stanford was on hiatus until the 1946 season.

Washington's most recent game was two months earlier on October 30, and they had lost a dozen players to active military duty since, including two of their best backs, Jay Stoves (a transfer from idle Washington State) and Pete Susick. Head coach Ralph Welch filled roster holes with Navy V-12 trainees and draft rejects who recently arrived at campus, leaving only 28 players available for the game. Oddsmakers made the Huskies two-touchdown favorites to beat USC, but the fielded team differed greatly from that of the regular season.

== Scoring ==
=== First quarter ===
No scoring

=== Second quarter ===
- USC – George Callanan, 11-yard pass from Jim Hardy (Dick Jamison kick good); USC leads 7–0

=== Third quarter ===
- USC – Callanan, 10-yard pass from Hardy (Jamison kick good); USC leads 14–0
- USC – Gordon Gray, 21-yard pass from Hardy (Jamison kick blocked); USC leads 20–0

=== Fourth quarter ===
- USC – Gray, 36-yard pass from Ainslie Bell (Jamison kick good); USC leads 27–0
- USC – Gerry Austin’s punt blocked and rolled into the end zone for a safety; USC leads 29–0
