= Bill Kriesel =

American football coach (born c. 1974)

Current position
- Title: Head coach
- Team: Southwestern (TX)
- Conference: SAA
- Record: 8–12

Biographical details
- Born: c. 1974 (age 51–52); Rosemount, Minnesota, U.S.
- Education: Augsburg College (1996); University of Phoenix (2010); University of Chicago

Playing career
- 1992–1995: Augsburg
- 1998–2001: Stuttgart Scorpions
- Position: Defensive back

Coaching career (HC unless noted)
- 1996–1998: Augsburg (DB)
- 2003–2004: Augsburg (DB)
- 2009–2012: Augsburg (DB)
- 2013–2014: Southwestern (TX) (DB)
- 2015: Southwestern (TX) (co-DC/DB)
- 2016–2022: Southwestern (TX) (DC/DB)
- 2023: Southwestern (TX) (assoc. HC/DC/DB)
- 2024–present: Southwestern (TX)

Head coaching record
- Overall: 8–12

Accomplishments and honors

Awards
- Augsburg Hall of Fame (2016); 3× First-team All-MIAC (1993–1995)

William Kriesel (born c. 1974) is an American college football coach. He is the head football coach for Southwestern University, a position he has held since 2024. He also coached for Augsburg. He played college football for Augsburg and professionally for the Stuttgart Scorpions of the German Football League (GFL) as a defensive back.

== Head coaching record ==
Year	Team	Overall	Conference	Standing	Bowl/playoffs
Southwestern Pirates (Southern Athletic Association) (2024–present)
2024	Southwestern	4–6	2–5	T–5th	
2025	Southwestern	4–6	2–5	6th	
2026	Southwestern	0–0	0–0		
Southwestern:		8–12	4–10		
Total:		8–12			
