= 1943 San Francisco Dons football team =

American college football season

1943 San Francisco Dons football
- Conference: Independent
- Record: 1–7
- Head coach: Al Tassi (2nd season)
- Home stadium: Kezar Stadium

1943 Western college football independents records
	Conf.			Overall
Team	W	L	T	W		L		T
No. 18 Colorado College		–		7	–	0	–	0
New Mexico A&M		–		4	–	0	–	0
No. 19 Pacific (CA)		–		7	–	2	–	0
Nevada		–		4	–	1	–	1
New Mexico		–		3	–	2	–	0
Arizona State–Flagstaff		–		1	–	1	–	0
Saint Mary's		–		2	–	5	–	0
San Francisco		–		1	–	7	–	0
Rankings from AP Poll

The 1943 San Francisco Dons football team was an American football team that represented the University of San Francisco as an independent during the 1943 college football season. In their second season under head coach Al Tassi, the Dons compiled a 1–7 record and were outscored by their opponents by a combined total of 199 to 13.

The Dons' one victory came against the 1943 Nevada Wolf Pack football team led by Marion Motley; it was the Wolf Pack's only loss of the 1943 season.

In the final Litkenhous Ratings, San Francisco ranked 147th among the nation's college and service teams with a rating of 53.1.

== Schedule ==
Date	Opponent	Site	Result	Attendance	Source
September 25	Pleasanton Naval Distribution Center	Kezar Stadium; San Francisco, CA	L 0–13	3,000	
October 3	Nevada	Kezar Stadium; San Francisco, CA	W 6–0		
October 11	Alameda Coast Guard	Kezar Stadium; San Francisco, CA	L 0–26	3,000	
October 16	No. 8 USC	Kezar Stadium; San Francisco, CA	L 0–34	6,000	
October 24	No. 15 Del Monte Pre-Flight	Kezar Stadium; San Francisco, CA	L 0–34	10,000	
October 31	Saint Mary's	Kezar Stadium; San Francisco, CA	L 7–19	15,000	
November 6	at California	California Memorial Stadium; Berkeley, CA	L 0–32	10,000–12,000	
November 14	St. Mary's Pre-Flight	Kezar Stadium; San Francisco, CA	L 0–41	5,000	
Rankings from AP Poll released prior to the game
