= 1943 Nevada Wolf Pack football team =

American college football season

1943 Nevada Wolf Pack football
- Conference: Independent
- Record: 4–1–1
- Head coach: Jim Aiken (5th season)
- Home stadium: Mackay Field

1943 Western college football independents records
	Conf.			Overall
Team	W	L	T	W		L		T
No. 18 Colorado College		–		7	–	0	–	0
New Mexico A&M		–		4	–	0	–	0
No. 19 Pacific (CA)		–		7	–	2	–	0
Nevada		–		4	–	1	–	1
New Mexico		–		3	–	2	–	0
Arizona State–Flagstaff		–		1	–	1	–	0
Saint Mary's		–		2	–	5	–	0
San Francisco		–		1	–	7	–	0
Rankings from AP Poll

The 1943 Nevada Wolf Pack football team, known for the final three games as the Flying Wolves and Flying Wolfpack, was an American football team that represented the University of Nevada as an independent during the 1943 college football season. In their fifth season under head coach Jim Aiken, the team compiled a 4–1–1 record.

Marion Motley, who was later inducted into the Pro Football Hall of Fame, played for the Wolf Pack from 1941 to 1943. He suffered a knee injury in 1943 and returned to his home in Canton, Ohio, to work after dropping out of school.

Bill Mackrides also played for the 1943 Wolf Pack. He later played seven years of professional football in the National Football League (NFL) and Canadian Football League (CFL).

On October 8, 1943, due to the loss of players to military service, the Nevada football team merged with the football team from the Reno Army Air Base team at Lemmon Valley. The combination of university and military football squads was reported to be "unprecedented in the history of the nation's wartime football." Because of an Army ruling that prohibited soldiers from playing on college teams, the combined team, known as the "Flying Wolves" or "Flying Wolfpack", played under the air base colors, and the University of Nevada players were deemed to have been absorbed into the air base squad. Jim Aiken remained head coach of the combined team with Lieutenants Dayton Doeler and Edward O'Neill acting as assistant coaches.

In the final Litkenhous Ratings, Nevada ranked 138th among the nation's college and service teams with a rating of 55.2.

== Schedule ==
Date	Opponent	Site	Result	Attendance	Source
September 19	Tonopah Army Air Base	Mackay Field; Reno, NV	W 34–0	3,000	
September 25	Reno Army Air Base	Mackay Field; Reno, NV	W 28–0		
October 3	at San Francisco	Kezar Stadium; San Francisco, CA	L 0–6		
October 10	Tonopah Bombing and Gunnery Range	Mackay Field; Reno, NV	W 25–0	1,800	
October 16	at Utah	Ute Stadium; Salt Lake City, UT	W 27–19	4,846	
October 24	Salt Lake City Army Air Base^{†}	Mackay Field; Reno, NV	T 0–0	2,500	
^{†}Homecoming
