= 1943 Colorado Buffaloes football team =

American college football season

1943 Colorado Buffaloes football
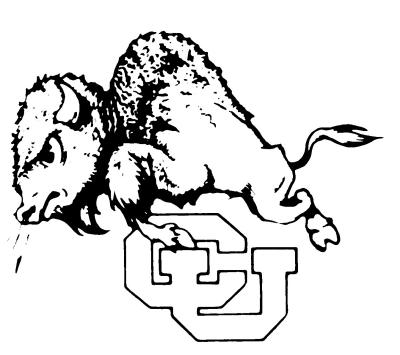

MSC champion
- Conference: Mountain States Conference
- Record: 5–2 (2–0 MSC)
- Head coach: James J. Yeager (3rd season)
- Captain: Game captains
- Home stadium: Colorado Stadium

1943 Mountain States Conference football standings
	Conf.					Overall
Team	W		L		T	W		L		T
Colorado $	2	–	0	–	0	5	–	2	–	0
Utah	0	–	2	–	0	0	–	7	–	0
Denver	0	–	0	–	0	2	–	5	–	0
$ – Conference champion

The 1943 Colorado Buffaloes football team was an American football team that represented the University of Colorado as a member of the Mountain States Conference (MSC) during the 1943 college football season. Led by third-year head coach James J. Yeager, the Buffaloes compiled an overall record of 5–2 with a mark of 2–0 in conference play, winning the MSC title.

In the final Litkenhous Ratings, Colorado ranked 62nd among the nation's college and service teams with a rating of 79.0.

== Schedule ==
Date	Opponent	Site	Result	Attendance	Source
September 25	Fort Warren*	Colorado Stadium; Boulder, CO	W 38–0		
October 2	Lowry Field*	Colorado Stadium; Boulder, CO	W 19–6		
October 9	Utah	Colorado Stadium; Boulder, CO (rivalry)	W 35–0		
October 16	Salt Lake AAB*	Colorado Stadium; Boulder, CO	W 14–0		
October 23	No. T–17 Colorado College*^{†}	Colorado Stadium; Boulder, CO	L 6–16		
November 6	at Utah	Ute Stadium; Salt Lake City, UT	W 22–19	4,500	
November 20	Colorado College*	Washburn Field; Colorado Springs, CO	L 0–6		
*Non-conference game; ^{†}Homecoming; Rankings from AP Poll released prior to the game

== After the season ==
=== NFL draft ===
The following Buffaloes was selected in the 1944 NFL draft following the season.

Round	Pick	Player	Position	NFL club
7	57	Paul Briggs	Tackle	Detroit Lions
26	266	Stan Hendrickson	End	Detroit Lions
27	284	Jim Smith	Tackle	Cleveland Rams
