= 1943 New Mexico Lobos football team =

American college football season

1943 New Mexico Lobos football

Sun Bowl, L 0–7 vs. Southwestern (TX)
- Conference: Independent
- Record: 3–2
- Head coach: Willis Barnes (2nd season)
- Home stadium: Hilltop Stadium

1943 Western college football independents records
	Conf.			Overall
Team	W	L	T	W		L		T
No. 18 Colorado College		–		7	–	0	–	0
New Mexico A&M		–		4	–	0	–	0
No. 19 Pacific (CA)		–		7	–	2	–	0
Nevada		–		4	–	1	–	1
New Mexico		–		3	–	2	–	0
Arizona State–Flagstaff		–		1	–	1	–	0
Saint Mary's		–		2	–	5	–	0
San Francisco		–		1	–	7	–	0
Rankings from AP Poll

The 1943 New Mexico Lobos football team represented the University of New Mexico as an independent during the 1943 college football season. In their second season under head coach Willis Barnes, the Lobos compiled a 3–2 record and were outscored by opponents by a total of 85 to 59.

In the final Litkenhous Ratings, New Mexico ranked 82nd among the nation's college and service teams with a rating of 72.2.

== Schedule ==
Date	Time	Opponent	Site	Result	Attendance	Source
September 25		at Colorado College	Washburn Field; Colorado Springs, CO	L 7–20		
October 2	8:00 p.m.	Kirtland Field	Albuquerque, NM	W 19–13	7,000	
October 16		Arizona State–Flagstaff^{†}	Albuquerque, NM	W 21–6	6,000	
November 13		at Denver	Hilltop Stadium; Denver, CO	W 33–13		
January 1, 1944		vs. Southwestern (TX)	Kidd Field; El Paso, TX (Sun Bowl)	L 0–7	12,000	
^{†}Homecoming; All times are in Mountain time
