= 1943 Saint Mary's Gaels football team =

American college football season

1943 Saint Mary's Gaels football
- Conference: Independent
- Record: 2–5
- Head coach: James Phelan (2nd season)
- Home stadium: Kezar Stadium

1943 Western college football independents records
	Conf.			Overall
Team	W	L	T	W		L		T
No. 18 Colorado College		–		7	–	0	–	0
New Mexico A&M		–		4	–	0	–	0
No. 19 Pacific (CA)		–		7	–	2	–	0
Nevada		–		4	–	1	–	1
New Mexico		–		3	–	2	–	0
Arizona State–Flagstaff		–		1	–	1	–	0
Saint Mary's		–		2	–	5	–	0
San Francisco		–		1	–	7	–	0
Rankings from AP Poll

The 1943 Saint Mary's Gaels football team was an American football team that represented Saint Mary's College of California during the 1943 college football season. In their second season under head coach James Phelan, the Gaels compiled a 2–5 record and were outscored by opponents by a combined total of 126 to 93.

The team was led on offense by Herman Wedemeyer, who was selected as a first-team halfback on the 1943 All-Pacific Coast football team. In 1979, Wedemeyer was inducted into the College Football Hall of Fame.

In the final Litkenhous Ratings, Saint Mary's ranked 97th among the nation's college and service teams with a rating of 67.2.

== Schedule ==
Date	Opponent	Site	Result	Attendance	Source
September 25	at California	California Memorial Stadium; Berkeley, CA	L 12–27	35,000	
October 3	Del Monte Pre-Flight	Kezar Stadium; San Francisco, CA	L 7–33	25,000	
October 17	Alameda Coast Guard	Kezar Stadium; San Francisco, CA	L 7–21	15,000	
October 30	vs. San Francisco	Kezar Stadium; San Francisco, CA	W 19–7	15,000	
November 6	at No. 10 Pacific (CA)	Baxter Stadium; Stockton, CA	L 7–19		
November 20	at UCLA	Los Angeles Memorial Coliseum; Los Angeles, CA	L 7–19	15,000	
November 25	at Utah	Ute Stadium; Salt Lake City, UT	W 34–0	9,000	
Rankings from Coaches' Poll released prior to the game
