= 1943 Kirtland Field Flying Kellys football team =

American college football season

1943 Kirtland Field Flying Kellys football
- Conference: Independent
- Record: 1–2
- Head coach: Ted Shipkey (2nd season)

1943 military service football records
| | Conf. | | | Overall |
| Team | W | L | T | W | | L | | T |
|---|---|---|---|---|---|---|---|---|
| No. 17 Bainbridge | | – | | 7 | – | 0 | – | 0 |
| Bunker Hill NAS | | – | | 6 | – | 0 | – | 0 |
| Greensboro | | – | | 4 | – | 0 | – | 0 |
| Memphis NATTC | | – | | 2 | – | 0 | – | 0 |
| No. 2 Iowa Pre-Flight | | – | | 9 | – | 1 | – | 0 |
| No. 10 March Field | | – | | 9 | – | 1 | – | 0 |
| No. 8 Del Monte Pre-Flight | | – | | 7 | – | 1 | – | 0 |
| Randolph Field | | – | | 9 | – | 1 | – | 1 |
| Georgia Pre-Flight | | – | | 5 | – | 1 | – | 0 |
| No. 6 Great Lakes Navy | | – | | 10 | – | 2 | – | 0 |
| Lubbock AAF | | – | | 5 | – | 1 | – | 0 |
| Ottumwa NAS | | – | | 5 | – | 1 | – | 0 |
| Camp Davis | | – | | 8 | – | 2 | – | 0 |
| Sampson NTS | | – | | 7 | – | 2 | – | 0 |
| San Diego NTS | | – | | 7 | – | 2 | – | 0 |
| Keesler Field | | – | | 3 | – | 1 | – | 0 |
| Wright Field | | – | | 1 | – | 0 | – | 1 |
| Camp Lejeune | | – | | 6 | – | 2 | – | 1 |
| Fort Riley | | – | | 6 | – | 2 | – | 1 |
| Kearns Field | | – | | 5 | – | 2 | – | 0 |
| Fort Knox | | – | | 4 | – | 2 | – | 0 |
| Cherry Point Marines | | – | | 4 | – | 2 | – | 1 |
| Alameda Coast Guard | | – | | 4 | – | 2 | – | 1 |
| Fort Douglas | | – | | 4 | – | 2 | – | 1 |
| 300th Infantry | | – | | 5 | – | 3 | – | 0 |
| 176th Infantry | | – | | 4 | – | 3 | – | 0 |
| Blackland AAF | | – | | 4 | – | 3 | – | 0 |
| Fort Sheridan | | – | | 4 | – | 3 | – | 0 |
| Fort Warren | | – | | 4 | – | 3 | – | 0 |
| Norman NAS | | – | | 4 | – | 3 | – | 0 |
| Charleston Coast Guard | | – | | 5 | – | 4 | – | 0 |
| Salt Lake AAB | | – | | 4 | – | 3 | – | 2 |
| 124th Infantry | | – | | 2 | – | 2 | – | 0 |
| Camp Kilmer | | – | | 2 | – | 2 | – | 0 |
| Camp Lee | | – | | 5 | – | 5 | – | 0 |
| Logan Navy | | – | | 2 | – | 2 | – | 0 |
| Spokane Air Service | | – | | 2 | – | 2 | – | 0 |
| Camp Edwards | | – | | 4 | – | 5 | – | 0 |
| Curtis Bay Coast Guard | | – | | 4 | – | 5 | – | 0 |
| Saint Mary's Pre-Flight | | – | | 3 | – | 4 | – | 1 |
| Jacksonville NATTC | | – | | 3 | – | 4 | – | 0 |
| Richmond AAB | | – | | 4 | – | 6 | – | 1 |
| Atlantic City NAS | | – | | 2 | – | 3 | – | 0 |
| North Carolina Pre-Flight | | – | | 2 | – | 4 | – | 1 |
| Patterson Field | | – | | 2 | – | 4 | – | 1 |
| Bowman Field | | – | | 2 | – | 4 | – | 0 |
| Kirtland Field | | – | | 1 | – | 2 | – | 0 |
| Lakehurst NAS | | – | | 2 | – | 4 | – | 0 |
| Camp Grant | | – | | 2 | – | 6 | – | 2 |
| Lowry Field | | – | | 1 | – | 3 | – | 0 |
| Fort Monroe | | – | | 3 | – | 7 | – | 0 |
| Daniel Field | | – | | 2 | – | 7 | – | 0 |
| Camp Gordon | | – | | 1 | – | 4 | – | 0 |
| South Plains AAF | | – | | 1 | – | 4 | – | 0 |
| Greenville AAB | | – | | 1 | – | 5 | – | 0 |
| Ward Island Marines | | – | | 1 | – | 5 | – | 0 |
| Bryan AAF | | – | | 1 | – | 6 | – | 0 |
| Pocatello AAB | | – | | 0 | – | 3 | – | 0 |
| Norfolk Fleet Marines | | – | | 0 | – | 9 | – | 0 |
Rankings from AP Poll

The 1943 Kirtland Field Flying Kellys football team represented the United States Army Air Forces's Kirtland Field, located in Albuquerque, New Mexico, during the 1943 college football season. Led by second-year head coach Ted Shipkey, the Flying Kellys compiled a record of 1–2. The team's roster included John Kimbrough.

In the final Litkenhous Ratings, Kirtland Field ranked 99th among the nation's college and service teams with a rating of 66.8.

== Schedule ==
| Date | Time | Opponent | Site | Result | Attendance | Source |
|---|---|---|---|---|---|---|
| October 2 | 8:00 p.m. | at New Mexico | Hilltop Stadium; Albuquerque, NM | L 13–19 | 7,000 | |
| October 16 | | at Colorado College | Washburn Field; Colorado Springs, CO | L 0–20 | | |
| October 23 | | at Arizona State–Flagstaff | Skidmore Field; Flagstaff, AZ | Canceled | | |
| October 30 | | South Plains AAF | Albuquerque, NM | W 18–0 | | |
All times are in Mountain time
