= 1944 Sun Bowl =

American college football game

- 10th Sun Bowl
New Mexico Lobos	Southwestern Pirates
(3–1)	(9–1–1)
Independent	Texas Conference
0	7
Head coach: Willis Barnes	Head coach: Randolph M. Medley
	1	2	3	4	Total
New Mexico	0	0	0	0	0
Southwestern	0	0	0	7	7
- Date: January 1, 1944
- Season: 1943
- Stadium: Kidd Field
- Location: El Paso, Texas
- MVP: William "Spot" Collins, Southwestern & Bill Thompson, New Mexico
- Attendance: 18,000
- Payout: US$6,181

The 1944 Sun Bowl was the tenth edition of the Sun Bowl, an annual postseason college football bowl game. The game was held at Kidd Field in El Paso, Texas, on January 1, 1944, with a crowd of approximately 18,000 spectators in attendance. The game featured the Southwestern Pirates and the New Mexico Lobos.

== Teams ==
=== Southwestern Pirates ===
Southwestern's teams during World War II benefited from the V-12 Navy College Training Program, which gave them access to experienced and skilled players. During the 1943 season, the Pirates team included varsity players formerly with Texas and with Baylor. The Pirates entered the bowl with a record of 9–1–1. Team captain William "Spot" Collins had played on the Texas team that won the 1943 Cotton Bowl Classic.

=== New Mexico Lobos ===
New Mexico entered the bowl with a record of 3–1, having most recently played on November 13, 1943, when they defeated the Denver Pioneers, 33–13.

== Game summary ==
The game began in cloudy weather with a temperature of 60 °F (16 °C) before the sun came out in the second half. Southwestern entered the game as the favorites and possessed a potent rushing offense. However, the game remained scoreless throughout the first three quarters and well into the final period. New Mexico threatened to score twice, in the first and in the second quarter, but could not advance beyond their opponent's 16-yard line. Southwestern began the fourth quarter with possession on their own 13-yard line. Pirates tailback R. W. MacGruder completed a pass to fullback R. L. Cooper for 27 yards, and soon afterward, MacGruder rushed 22 yards to the Lobos' 19-yard line. However, New Mexico held firm and recovered the ball on downs, but making no progress themselves, were forced to punt. Cooper then completed a pass to the New Mexico 37-yard line for a first down, and then with seven minutes remaining to play, he connected with MacGruder for the game-winning touchdown. Spot Collins kicked the extra point.

== Aftermath ==
After the game, New Mexico lineman Bill Thompson and Southwestern team captain Spot Collins were named the most outstanding players. New Mexico tied a record set two years earlier by Texas Tech for the fewest first downs. The 1944 game featured the fewest combined offensive yards at a Sun Bowl game.

Southwestern returned in the 1945 Sun Bowl to win back-to-back championships. New Mexico returned to win the 1946 Sun Bowl.

== Statistics ==
Statistics	New Mexico	Southwestern
First downs	4	12
Rushing yards	38	214
Passing yards	10	65
Passing	3–10–0	7–10–1
Total offense	48	279
Fumbles–lost	1–0	1–1
Penalties–yards	4–20	4–20
Punts–average	11–38	5–35
Punt returns	2–7	4–66
Kickoff returns	1–17	1–30
