= 1943 UCLA Bruins football team =

American college football season

1943 UCLA Bruins football
- Conference: Pacific Coast Conference
- Record: 1–8 (0–4 PCC)
- Head coach: Edwin C. Horrell (5th season)
- Home stadium: Los Angeles Memorial Coliseum

1943 Pacific Coast Conference football standings
	Conf.					Overall
Team	W		L		T	W		L		T
USC $	5	–	0	–	0	8	–	2	–	0
California	2	–	2	–	0	4	–	6	–	0
No. 12 Washington	0	–	1	–	0	4	–	1	–	0
UCLA	0	–	4	–	0	1	–	8	–	0
$ – Conference champion; Rankings from AP Poll

The 1943 UCLA Bruins football team was an American football team that represented the University of California, Los Angeles during the 1943 college football season. In their fifth year under head coach Edwin C. Horrell, the Bruins compiled a 1–8 record (0–4 conference) and finished in last place in the Pacific Coast Conference.

In the final Litkenhous Ratings, UCLA ranked 92nd among the nation's college and service teams with a rating of 67.8.

== Schedule ==
Date	Opponent	Site	Result	Attendance	Source
September 25	USC	Los Angeles Memorial Coliseum; Los Angeles, CA (Victory Bell)	L 0–20	50,000	
October 2	Pacific (CA)*	Los Angeles Memorial Coliseum; Los Angeles, CA	L 7–19	22,000	
October 9	at No. 16 March Field*	Riverside County, CA	L 7–47	9,000	
October 16	California	Los Angeles Memorial Coliseum; Los Angeles, CA (rivalry)	L 0–13	20,000	
October 30	at San Diego NTS*	Hull Field; San Diego, CA	L 0–28	6,000	
November 6	Del Monte Pre-Flight*	Los Angeles Memorial Coliseum; Los Angeles, CA	L 7–26	10,000	
November 13	at California	California Memorial Stadium; Berkeley, CA	L 6–13	20,000	
November 20	Saint Mary's*	Los Angeles Memorial Coliseum; Los Angeles, CA	W 19–7	11,000	
November 27	at USC	Los Angeles Memorial Coliseum; Los Angeles, CA	L 13–26	35,000	
*Non-conference game; Rankings from AP Poll released prior to the game
