= Paul Rickards =

American football player (1926–1999)

No. 77
- Position: Quarterback

Personal information
- Born: June 30, 1926; Wheeling, West Virginia, U.S.
- Died: July 26, 1999 (age 73)
- Listed height: 6 ft 1 in (1.85 m)
- Listed weight: 193 lb (88 kg)

Career information
- High school: Wheeling High School
- College: University of Pittsburgh

Career history
- Los Angeles Rams (1948)

Awards and highlights
- NCAA passing yards leader (1944)
- Stats at Pro Football Reference

Paul Edward Rickards (June 30, 1926 – July 26, 1999) was an American football player.

Rickards was born in Wheeling, West Virginia, in 1926, and attended Wheeling High School. He was selected as the quarterback on the All-West Virginia team and also received all-state honors in basketball and excelled in track and field as a hurdler.

He enrolled at the University of Pittsburgh in the fall of 1944 and, as an 18-year-old freshman, became the starting quarterback of the 1944 Pittsburgh Panthers football team. He led the NCAA in passing yardage in 1944 with 997 yards.

Less than a week after the 1944 season ended, Rickards was inducted into the Army Air Force.

Rickards was discharged in the fall of 1946. He announced in November 1946 that he would return to the University of Pittsburgh at the midterm break. After two years away from the game, Rickards returned to Pitt for the 1947 season. He had trouble adjusting to coach Mike Milligan's single-wing and saw little playing time in 1947.

In August 1948, after an unsuccessful tryout with the Cleveland Browns, Rickards signed with the Los Angeles Rams. As the Rams had Pro Football Hall of Famer Bob Waterfield as their starting quarterback, Rickards appeared in only three games as a backup with the Rams. He completed two of two pass attempts for four yards. He also had two carries for 21 rushing yards.

In July 1949, Rickards was the first player signed by the Richmond Rebels of the new American Football League. He competed with Ben Raimondi for the starting job at quarterback. During the 1949 and 1950 seasons, he appeared in 17 games for the Rebels, compiling a total of 1,928 passing yards and 28 touchdown passes.

== See also ==
- List of college football yearly passing leaders
