= 1943 California Golden Bears football team =

American college football season

1943 California Golden Bears football
- Conference: Pacific Coast Conference
- Record: 4–6 (2–2 PCC)
- Head coach: Stub Allison (9th season)
- Home stadium: California Memorial Stadium

1943 Pacific Coast Conference football standings
	Conf.					Overall
Team	W		L		T	W		L		T
USC $	5	–	0	–	0	8	–	2	–	0
California	2	–	2	–	0	4	–	6	–	0
No. 12 Washington	0	–	1	–	0	4	–	1	–	0
UCLA	0	–	4	–	0	1	–	8	–	0
$ – Conference champion; Rankings from AP Poll

The 1943 California Golden Bears football team was an American football team that represented the University of California, Berkeley as a member of the Pacific Coast Conference (PCC) during the 1943 college football season. Led by ninth-year head coach Stub Allison, the team compiled an overall record of 4–6 with a 2–2 mark in conference play, finishing second in the PCC.

In the final Litkenhous Ratings, California ranked 76th among the nation's college and service teams with a rating of 74.4.

== Schedule ==
Date	Opponent	Rank	Site	Result	Attendance	Source
September 25	Saint Mary's*		California Memorial Stadium; Berkeley, CA	W 27–12	35,000	
October 2	USC		California Memorial Stadium; Berkeley, CA	L 0–7	55,000	
October 9	No. 20 Pacific (CA)*		California Memorial Stadium; Berkeley, CA	L 6–12	20,000	
October 16	at UCLA		Los Angeles Memorial Coliseum; Los Angeles, CA (rivalry)	W 13–0	20,000	
October 23	Saint Mary's Pre-Flight*		California Memorial Stadium; Berkeley, CA	L 0–39		
October 30	at No. 5 USC	No. 20	Los Angeles Memorial Coliseum; Los Angeles, CA	L 0–13	30,000	
November 6	San Francisco*		California Memorial Stadium; Berkeley, CA	W 32–0	10,000–12,000	
November 13	UCLA		California Memorial Stadium; Berkeley, CA	W 13–6	20,000	
November 20	Alameda Coast Guard*		California Memorial Stadium; Berkeley, CA	L 0–7	8,000	
November 27	No. 10 Del Monte Pre-Flight*		California Memorial Stadium; Berkeley, CA	L 8–47	10,000–12,000	
*Non-conference game; Rankings from AP Poll released prior to the game
