= 1943 college football season =

American college football season

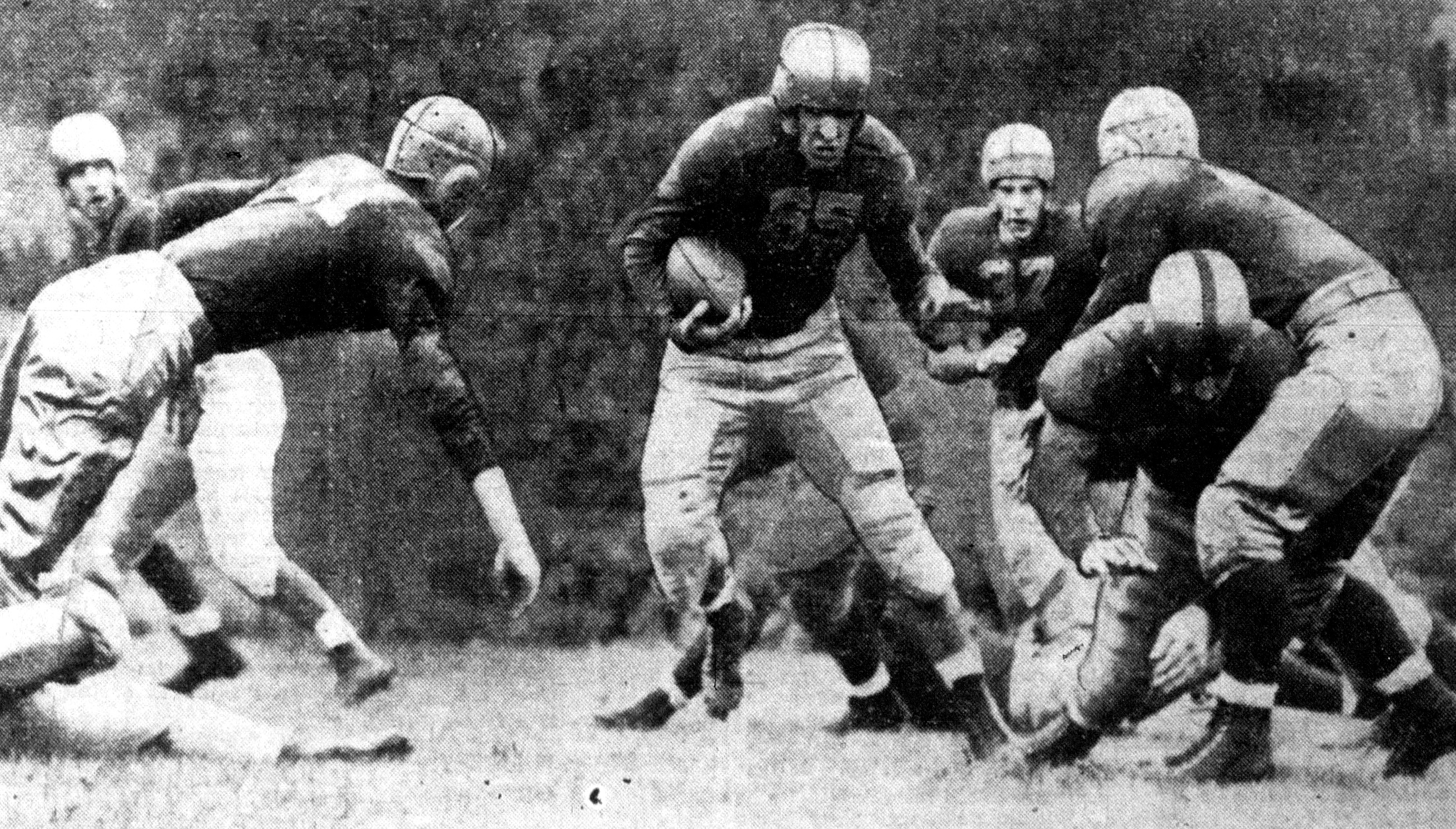
- Notre Dame v Wisconsin game
- First AP No. 1 of season: Notre Dame
- Number of bowls: 5
- Champion: Notre Dame (AP)
- Heisman: Angelo Bertelli, (quarterback, Notre Dame)

The 1943 college football season was the 75th season of intercollegiate football in the United States. Played during World War II, the competition included schools from the Big Ten Conference, the Pacific Coast Conference (PCC), the Southeastern Conference (SEC), the Big Six Conference, the Southwestern Conference, and numerous smaller conferences and independent programs.

The teams ranked highest in the final Associated Press poll in December 1943:

1. The Notre Dame Fighting Irish compiled a 9–1 record and were ranked No. 1 in the final AP poll. They lost their final game of the season against No. 6 Great Lakes Navy. The Fighting Irish defeated two No. 2 ranked teams (Michigan and Iowa Pre-Flight) and two No. 3 ranked teams (Navy and Army).
2. The Iowa Pre-Flight Seahawks, led by head coach Don Faurot, compiled a 9–1 record, outscored opponents by a total of 277 to 98, and led the nation with 324.4 rushing yards per game. They ranked highest among the service teams.
3. The Michigan Wolverines, led by head coach Fritz Crisler, compiled an 8–1 record and tied for the Big Ten championship. They outscored opponents by a total of 302 to 73. Their only loss was to No. 1 Notre Dame. The Wolverines led the Big Ten (and ranked fifth nationally) with an average of 363.2 yards per game of total offense. They also led the Big Ten (and ranked 10th nationally) by giving up 164.1 yards per game in total defense. Bill Daley rushed for 817 yards and led the nation with an average of 6.81 yards per carry.
4. The Navy Midshipmen compiled an 8–1 record and outscored opponents by a total of 236 to 88. They ranked eighth nationally in total defense, giving up only 161.2 yards per game.
5. The Purdue Boilermakers compiled a 9–0 record, tying with Michigan for the Big Ten championship and outscoring opponents by a total of 214 to 55. Guard Alex Agase was a consensus All-American. Fullback Tony Butkovich (who was later killed at the Battle of Okinawa in 1945) led the Big Ten and ranked third nationally with 833 rushing yards.

Quarterback Angelo Bertelli of Notre Dame won the Heisman Trophy, and halfback Bob O'Dell of Penn won the Maxwell Award. The statistical leaders for 1943 included Robert Hoernschemeyer of Indiana with 1,648 yards of total offense, Creighton Miller of Notre Dame with 911 rushing yards, Paul Rickards of Pittsburgh with 997 passing yards, Marion Flanagan of Texas A&M with 403 receiving yards, and Steve Van Buren of LSU with 98 points scored.

A number of universities suspended their football programs for the 1943 season, including Alabama, Auburn, Boston College, Duquesne, Florida, Fordham, Harvard, Kentucky, Michigan State, Ole Miss, Mississippi State, Oregon State, Stanford, Syracuse, Tennessee, Vanderbilt, Washington State, and William & Mary.

== Conference and program changes ==
School	1942 Conference	1943 Conference
Creighton Bluejays	Missouri Valley	Dropped Program
Manhattan Jaspers	Independent	Dropped Program
Washington University in St. Louis Bears	Missouri Valley	Independent

== September ==
September 17 Georgia beat Presbyterian College 25–7. The next day, September 18, Michigan won at Camp Grant, 26–0. Wisconsin lost to Marquette, 33–7, on its way to a 1–9–0 finish.

September 25 Ohio State lost to Iowa Pre-Flight 28–13. Michigan beat Western Michigan 57–6. Notre Dame won at Pitt, 42–0. Army beat Villanova 27–0, and Navy beat North Carolina Pre-Flight, 31–0. Georgia lost at LSU, 34–27. Tulsa beat SMU 20–7. Georgia Tech beat North Carolina 20–7.

== October ==
October 2 Michigan won at Northwestern 21–7. Notre Dame beat Georgia Tech 55–13. Army defeated Colgate 42–0, and Navy beat Cornell 46–7. The first AP poll of the season led off with No. 1 Notre Dame, No. 2 Michigan, No. 3 Army, No. 4 Navy, and No. 5 Duke.

October 9 No. 1 Notre Dame beat No. 2 Michigan 35–21 in the first No. 1 vs. No. 2 matchup in the seven-year history of the AP poll. No. 3 Army registered another shutout, defeating Temple 51–0. In Baltimore, No. 4 Navy edged No. 5 Duke, 14–13. No. 6 Penn edged No. 14 Dartmouth 7–6. No. 7 Purdue went to 4–0–0 with a 19–0 win over Camp Grant. The next AP poll featured No. 1 Notre Dame, No. 2 Army, No. 3 Navy, No. 4 Penn, and No. 5 Purdue.

October 16 No. 1 Notre Dame won at Wisconsin 50–0. No. 2 Army won at Columbia, 52–0. In four games, the Cadets had outscored their opponents 172–0. No. 3 Navy beat Penn State 14–6. No. 4 Penn beat the Lakehurst Naval Air Station 74–6. No. 5 Purdue beat Ohio State 30–7 at a game in Cleveland. Penn and Purdue swapped spots in the next AP poll, but Notre Dame, Army, and Navy remained the top three.

October 23 No. 1 Notre Dame beat Illinois 47–0. No. 2 Army yielded its first points, but won at Yale, 39–7. No. 3 Navy beat Georgia Tech 28–14 in Baltimore. No. 4 Purdue beat Iowa 28–7. No. 5 Penn won at Columbia, 33–0, but dropped from the Top Five. No. 7 USC stayed unbeaten, untied, and unscored upon with a 6–0 win over No. 6 Pacific, and the next poll raised the Trojans to No. 5 behind Notre Dame, Army, Navy, and Purdue.

October 30 In Cleveland, No. 1 Notre Dame beat No. 3 Navy, 33–6. In Philadelphia, No. 2 Army and No. 6 Pennsylvania played to a 13–13 tie. No. 4 Purdue won at Wisconsin, 32–0. No. 5 USC beat California, 13–0, for its sixth straight shutout. The next AP poll featured No. 1 Notre Dame, No. 2 Purdue, No. 3 Army, No. 4 USC, and No. 5 Penn.

== November ==
November 6 At Yankee Stadium in New York, No. 1 Notre Dame beat No. 3 Army, 26–0. No. 2 Purdue won at Minnesota, 14–7. No. 4 USC lost at San Diego to the San Diego Navy team. No. 5 Penn lost to No. 7 Navy, 24–7. No. 6 Michigan beat Indiana 23–6. No. 8 Iowa Pre-Flight continued its unbeaten streak with a 46–19 win at Marquette on November 7, and became the first “service team” to ever reach the AP's Top Five, ranking No. 5 behind Notre Dame, Purdue, Navy, and Michigan.

November 13 No. 1 Notre Dame won at Northwestern 25–6. No. 2 Purdue was idle. No. 3 Navy won at Columbia 61–0. No. 4 Michigan beat Wisconsin 27–0. No. 5 Iowa Pre-Flight beat Camp Grant 28–13. The AP voters elevated Iowa Pre-Flight to No. 2 in the next poll, just in time for a showdown with No. 1 Notre Dame. No. 3 Purdue, No. 4 Michigan, and No. 5 Navy rounded out the Top Five.

November 20 No. 1 Notre Dame edged No. 2 Iowa Pre-Flight, 14–13. No. 3 Purdue closed its season undefeated (9–0–0) with a 7–0 win at Indiana. No. 4 Michigan closed its season at 8–1–0 with a 45–7 win over Ohio State. No. 5 Navy was idle. No. 6 Duke closed its season at 8–1–0 with a 27–6 win over North Carolina and was raised to No. 5 in the next AP poll behind Notre Dame, Iowa Pre-Flight, Michigan, and Purdue.

November 27 No. 1 Notre Dame closed its season with a 19–14 loss to Great Lakes NTC, 19–14, but still finished No. 1 in the final rankings. Iowa Pre-Flight, which had stayed at No. 2 after its close loss to Notre Dame, beat Minnesota, 32–0, to finish at 9–1–0. No. 3 Michigan, No. 4 Purdue, and No. 5 Duke had finished their seasons. No. 6 Navy closed its season with a 13–0 win over No. 7 Army in the Army–Navy Game, which took place at West Point. The Midshipmen rose to No. 4 in the final poll, behind Notre Dame, Iowa Pre-Flight, and Michigan. Purdue moved down to No. 5, Great Lakes NTC entered the poll at No. 6 after their upset of Notre Dame, and Duke slipped to No. 7.

== Conference standings ==
=== Major conference standings ===
1943 Big Six Conference football standings
	Conf.					Overall
Team	W		L		T	W		L		T
Oklahoma $	5	–	0	–	0	7	–	2	–	0
Missouri	3	–	2	–	0	3	–	5	–	0
Iowa State	3	–	2	–	0	4	–	4	–	0
Kansas	2	–	3	–	0	4	–	5	–	1
Nebraska	2	–	3	–	0	2	–	6	–	0
Kansas State	0	–	5	–	0	1	–	7	–	0
$ – Conference champion

1943 Big Ten Conference football standings
	Conf.					Overall
Team	W		L		T	W		L		T
No. 5 Purdue +	6	–	0	–	0	9	–	0	–	0
No. 3 Michigan +	6	–	0	–	0	8	–	1	–	0
No. 9 Northwestern	5	–	1	–	0	6	–	2	–	0
Indiana	2	–	3	–	1	4	–	4	–	2
Minnesota	2	–	3	–	0	5	–	4	–	0
Illinois	2	–	4	–	0	3	–	7	–	0
Ohio State	1	–	4	–	0	3	–	6	–	0
Wisconsin	1	–	6	–	0	1	–	9	–	0
Iowa	0	–	4	–	1	1	–	6	–	1
+ – Conference co-champions; Rankings from AP Poll

1943 Missouri Valley Conference football standings
	Conf.					Overall
Team	W		L		T	W		L		T
No. 15 Tulsa $	1	–	0	–	0	6	–	1	–	1
Oklahoma A&M	0	–	1	–	0	3	–	4	–	0
$ – Conference champion; Rankings from AP Poll

1943 Mountain States Conference football standings
	Conf.					Overall
Team	W		L		T	W		L		T
Colorado $	2	–	0	–	0	5	–	2	–	0
Utah	0	–	2	–	0	0	–	7	–	0
Denver	0	–	0	–	0	2	–	5	–	0
$ – Conference champion

1943 Pacific Coast Conference football standings
	Conf.					Overall
Team	W		L		T	W		L		T
USC $	5	–	0	–	0	8	–	2	–	0
California	2	–	2	–	0	4	–	6	–	0
No. 12 Washington	0	–	1	–	0	4	–	1	–	0
UCLA	0	–	4	–	0	1	–	8	–	0
$ – Conference champion; Rankings from AP Poll

1943 Southeastern Conference football standings
	Conf.					Overall
Team		W		L			W		L
No. 13 Georgia Tech $	3	–	0	–	0	8	–	3	–	0
LSU	2	–	2	–	0	6	–	3	–	0
Tulane	1	–	1	–	0	3	–	3	–	0
Georgia	0	–	3	–	0	6	–	4	–	0
Vanderbilt	0	–	0	–	0	5	–	0	–	0
$ – Conference champion; Seven other SEC schools did not field a team due to World War II.; Rankings from AP Poll

1943 Southern Conference football standings
	Conf.					Overall
Team	W		L		T	W		L		T
No. 7 Duke $	4	–	0	–	0	8	–	1	–	0
Maryland	2	–	0	–	0	4	–	5	–	0
South Carolina	2	–	1	–	0	5	–	2	–	0
Wake Forest	3	–	2	–	0	4	–	5	–	0
North Carolina	2	–	2	–	0	6	–	3	–	0
Richmond	1	–	1	–	0	6	–	1	–	0
Clemson	2	–	3	–	0	2	–	6	–	0
VMI	2	–	3	–	0	2	–	6	–	0
NC State	1	–	4	–	0	3	–	6	–	0
Davidson	0	–	3	–	0	0	–	5	–	0
$ – Conference champion; Rankings from AP Poll

1943 Southwest Conference football standings
	Conf.					Overall
Team	W		L		T	W		L		T
No. 14 Texas $	5	–	0	–	0	7	–	1	–	1
Texas A&M	4	–	1	–	0	7	–	2	–	1
Rice	2	–	3	–	0	3	–	7	–	0
SMU	2	–	3	–	0	2	–	7	–	0
TCU	1	–	4	–	0	2	–	6	–	0
Arkansas	1	–	4	–	0	2	–	7	–	0
$ – Conference champion; Rankings from AP Poll

=== Independents ===
1943 Eastern college football independents records
	Conf.			Overall
Team	W	L	T	W		L		T
Boston College		–		4	–	0	–	1
Franklin & Marshall		–		7	–	1	–	0
Dartmouth		–		6	–	1	–	0
Rochester		–		6	–	1	–	0
No. 11 Army		–		7	–	2	–	1
Holy Cross		–		6	–	2	–	0
Tufts		–		6	–	2	–	0
No. 20 Penn		–		6	–	2	–	1
Brown		–		5	–	3	–	0
Villanova		–		5	–	3	–	0
Colgate		–		5	–	3	–	1
Penn State		–		5	–	3	–	1
Bucknell		–		6	–	4	–	0
Cornell		–		6	–	4	–	0
Harvard		–		2	–	2	–	1
Yale		–		4	–	5	–	0
Pittsburgh		–		3	–	5	–	0
Temple		–		2	–	6	–	0
CCNY		–		1	–	3	–	1
Princeton		–		1	–	6	–	0
Carnegie Tech		–		0	–	4	–	1
Columbia		–		0	–	8	–	0
Rankings from AP Poll

1943 Midwestern college football independents records
	Conf.			Overall
Team	W	L	T	W		L		T
Michigan State Normal		–		2	–	0	–	0
DePauw		–		5	–	0	–	1
No. 1 Notre Dame		–		9	–	1	–	0
Miami (OH)		–		7	–	2	–	1
Western Michigan		–		4	–	2	–	0
Bowling Green		–		5	–	3	–	1
Marquette		–		3	–	4	–	1
Central Michigan		–		2	–	3	–	0
Ohio Wesleyan		–		4	–	6	–	0
Xavier		–		1	–	6	–	0
Wayne		–		0	–	3	–	0
Rankings from AP Poll

1943 Southern college football independents records
	Conf.			Overall
Team	W	L	T	W		L		T
No. 4 Navy		–		8	–	1	–	0
Miami (FL)		–		5	–	1	–	0
West Virginia		–		4	–	3	–	0
Howard (AL)		–		2	–	2	–	0
North Texas Aggies		–		3	–	4	–	1
Virginia		–		3	–	4	–	1
Texas Tech		–		4	–	6	–	0
Tennessee Tech		–		1	–	5	–	0
Sewanee		–		0	–	3	–	0
Rankings from AP Poll

1943 Western college football independents records
	Conf.			Overall
Team	W	L	T	W		L		T
No. 18 Colorado College		–		7	–	0	–	0
New Mexico A&M		–		4	–	0	–	0
No. 19 Pacific (CA)		–		7	–	2	–	0
Nevada		–		4	–	1	–	1
New Mexico		–		3	–	2	–	0
Arizona State–Flagstaff		–		1	–	1	–	0
Saint Mary's		–		2	–	5	–	0
San Francisco		–		1	–	7	–	0
Rankings from AP Poll

1943 military service football records
	Conf.			Overall
Team	W	L	T	W		L		T
No. 17 Bainbridge		–		7	–	0	–	0
Bunker Hill NAS		–		6	–	0	–	0
Greensboro		–		4	–	0	–	0
Memphis NATTC		–		2	–	0	–	0
No. 2 Iowa Pre-Flight		–		9	–	1	–	0
No. 10 March Field		–		9	–	1	–	0
No. 8 Del Monte Pre-Flight		–		7	–	1	–	0
Randolph Field		–		9	–	1	–	1
Georgia Pre-Flight		–		5	–	1	–	0
No. 6 Great Lakes Navy		–		10	–	2	–	0
Lubbock AAF		–		5	–	1	–	0
Ottumwa NAS		–		5	–	1	–	0
Camp Davis		–		8	–	2	–	0
Sampson NTS		–		7	–	2	–	0
San Diego NTS		–		7	–	2	–	0
Keesler Field		–		3	–	1	–	0
Wright Field		–		1	–	0	–	1
Camp Lejeune		–		6	–	2	–	1
Fort Riley		–		6	–	2	–	1
Kearns Field		–		5	–	2	–	0
Fort Knox		–		4	–	2	–	0
Cherry Point Marines		–		4	–	2	–	1
Alameda Coast Guard		–		4	–	2	–	1
Fort Douglas		–		4	–	2	–	1
300th Infantry		–		5	–	3	–	0
176th Infantry		–		4	–	3	–	0
Blackland AAF		–		4	–	3	–	0
Fort Sheridan		–		4	–	3	–	0
Fort Warren		–		4	–	3	–	0
Norman NAS		–		4	–	3	–	0
Charleston Coast Guard		–		5	–	4	–	0
Salt Lake AAB		–		4	–	3	–	2
124th Infantry		–		2	–	2	–	0
Camp Kilmer		–		2	–	2	–	0
Camp Lee		–		5	–	5	–	0
Logan Navy		–		2	–	2	–	0
Spokane Air Service		–		2	–	2	–	0
Camp Edwards		–		4	–	5	–	0
Curtis Bay Coast Guard		–		4	–	5	–	0
Saint Mary's Pre-Flight		–		3	–	4	–	1
Jacksonville NATTC		–		3	–	4	–	0
Richmond AAB		–		4	–	6	–	1
Atlantic City NAS		–		2	–	3	–	0
North Carolina Pre-Flight		–		2	–	4	–	1
Patterson Field		–		2	–	4	–	1
Bowman Field		–		2	–	4	–	0
Kirtland Field		–		1	–	2	–	0
Lakehurst NAS		–		2	–	4	–	0
Camp Grant		–		2	–	6	–	2
Lowry Field		–		1	–	3	–	0
Fort Monroe		–		3	–	7	–	0
Daniel Field		–		2	–	7	–	0
Camp Gordon		–		1	–	4	–	0
South Plains AAF		–		1	–	4	–	0
Greenville AAB		–		1	–	5	–	0
Ward Island Marines		–		1	–	5	–	0
Bryan AAF		–		1	–	6	–	0
Pocatello AAB		–		0	–	3	–	0
Norfolk Fleet Marines		–		0	–	9	–	0
Rankings from AP Poll

=== Minor conferences ===
Conference	Champion(s)	Record
Border Intercollegiate Athletic Association	No champion	—
California Collegiate Athletic Association	No champion	—
Central Intercollegiate Athletics Association	Morgan State College	5–1–1
Central Intercollegiate Athletic Conference	No champion	—
Far Western Conference	No champion	—
Indiana Intercollegiate Conference	DePauw; Earlham	2–0
Iowa Intercollegiate Athletic Conference	No champion	—
Kansas Collegiate Athletic Conference	No champion	—
Lone Star Conference	No champion	—
Midwest Collegiate Athletic Conference	No champion	—
Minnesota Intercollegiate Athletic Conference	No champion	—
Missouri Intercollegiate Athletic Association	No champion	—
Nebraska College Athletic Conference	No champion	—
New Mexico Intercollegiate Conference	No champion	—
North Central Intercollegiate Athletic Conference	No champion	—
North Dakota College Athletic Conference	No champion	—
Ohio Athletic Conference	No champion	—
Oklahoma Collegiate Athletic Conference	No champion	—
Pacific Northwest Conference	No champion	—
Pennsylvania State Athletic Conference	No champion	—
Rocky Mountain Athletic Conference	No champion	—
South Dakota Intercollegiate Conference	No champion	—
Southern California Intercollegiate Athletic Conference	No champion	—
Southern Intercollegiate Athletic Conference	Tuskegee	4–1–1
Southwestern Athletic Conference	No champion	—
State Teacher's College Conference of Minnesota	No champion	—
Texas Collegiate Athletic Conference	No champion	—
Washington Intercollegiate Conference	No champion	—
Wisconsin State Teachers College Conference	No champion	—

=== Minor conference standings ===
1943 Colored Intercollegiate Athletic Association football standings
	Conf.					Overall
Team	W		L		T	W		L		T
Morgan State $	2	–	0	–	0	5	–	0	–	0
North Carolina A&T	2	–	0	–	0	4	–	0	–	0
Virginia State	2	–	2	–	0	5	–	2	–	0
Hampton	2	–	2	–	0	2	–	4	–	0
Johnson C. Smith	1	–	3	–	0	5	–	4	–	0
West Virginia State	0	–	2	–	0	0	–	2	–	0
$ – Conference champion

1943 Illinois Intercollegiate Athletic Conference football standings
	Conf.					Overall
Team	W		L		T	W		L		T
Northern Illinois State	1	–	0	–	0	4	–	1	–	1
Illinois State Normal	1	–	0	–	0	6	–	2	–	1
Western Illinois	0	–	2	–	0	1	–	6	–	0
Eastern Illinois	0	–	0	–	0	0	–	0	–	0
Southern Illinois	0	–	0	–	0	0	–	0	–	0

1943 Middle Three Conference football standings
	Conf.					Overall
Team	W		L		T	W		L		T
Lafayette +	3	–	1	–	0	4	–	1	–	0
Rutgers +	3	–	1	–	0	3	–	2	–	0
Lehigh	0	–	4	–	0	0	–	5	–	1
+ – Conference co-champions

1943 Ohio Athletic Conference football standings
	Conf.					Overall
Team	W		L		T	W		L		T
Oberlin $	4	–	0	–	0	7	–	0	–	1
Kenyon	1	–	0	–	1	2	–	0	–	2
Baldwin–Wallace	2	–	2	–	0	4	–	4	–	1
Case	2	–	2	–	0	3	–	4	–	0
Otterbein	0	–	1	–	1	2	–	1	–	1
Wooster	0	–	4	–	0	2	–	6	–	0
$ – Conference champion

1943 Southern Intercollegiate Athletic Conference football standings
	Conf.					Overall
Team	W		L		T	W		L		T
Tuskegee $	4	–	1	–	1	9	–	2	–	1
Morris Brown	2	–	1	–	3	2	–	1	–	3
Clark (GA)	3	–	2	–	0	3	–	3	–	0
Florida A&M	1	–	1	–	2	7	–	3	–	0
Morehouse	1	–	2	–	1	2	–	2	–	1
Alabama State	1	–	3	–	1	1	–	4	–	1
Xavier (LA)	0	–	2	–	0	0	–	4	–	1
$ – Conference champion

== Heisman Trophy voting ==
The Heisman Trophy is given to the year's most outstanding player

Player	School	Position	Total
Angelo Bertelli	Notre Dame	QB	648
Bob Odell	Penn	HB	177
Otto Graham	Northwestern	HB	140
Creighton Miller	Notre Dame	HB	134
Eddie Prokop	Georgia Tech	HB	85
Hal Hamburg	Navy	HB	73
Bill Daley	Michigan	FB	71
Tony Butkovich	Purdue	FB	65
Jim White	Notre Dame	OT	52

== Bowl games ==
Bowl game	Winning team		Losing team	
Rose Bowl	USC	29	No. 12 Washington	0
Sugar Bowl	No. 13 Georgia Tech	20	No. 15 Tulsa	18
Orange Bowl	LSU	19	Texas A&M	14
Cotton Bowl Classic	No. 14 Texas	7	Randolph Field	7
Sun Bowl	Southwestern (TX)	7	New Mexico	0

== Statistical leaders ==
=== Team leaders ===
==== Total offense ====
Rank	Team	Games played	Total plays	Yards gained	Yards per game
1	Notre Dame	10	734	4180	418.0
2	Iowa-Pre-Flight	10	583	3929	392.9
3	Washington	4	250	1499	374.8
4	Duke	9	566	3299	366.6
5	Michigan	9	582	3269	363.2
6	Army	10	639	3545	354.5
7	Texas	8	498	2814	351.8
8	Tulsa	7	425	2379	339.9
9	Georgia	9*	593	2969	329.9
10	Holy Cross	8	587	2628	323.5

(*) One game not reported

==== Total defense ====
Rank	Team	Games played	Total plays	Yards gained	Yards per game
1	Duke	9	405	1095	121.7
2	Tulsa	7	383	881	125.9
3	Penn State	9	439	1176	130.7
4	Texas A&M	9	488	1178	130.9
5	Holy Cross	8	371	1104	138.0
6	Texas	8	357	1110	138.8
7	Army	10	521	1525	152.5
8	Navy	9	499	1451	161.2
9	USC	8	413	1299	162.4
10	Michigan	8*	460	1313	164.1

(*) One game not reported

==== Rushing offense ====
Rank	Team	Games	Rushes	Yards gained	Yards per game
1	Iowa Pre-Flight	10	481	3244	324.4
2	Notre Dame	10	625	3137	313.7
3	Duke	9	487	2660	295.6
4	Michigan	9	508	2648	294.2
5	Washington			1170	292.5
6	Army			2568	256.8
7	Texas			2016	252.0
8	Minnesota			2202	244.7
9	Navy			2165	240.6
10	Holy Cross			1876	234.5

==== Scoring ====
1. Duke - 37.2 points per game
2. Notre Dame - 34.0 points per game
3. Tulsa - 33.6 points per game
4. Michigan - 33.6 points per game
5. Del Monte Pre-Flight - 31.5 points per game
6. Texas - 30.8 points per game
7. Army - 29.9 points per game
8. March Field - 29.2 points per game
9. Colorado College - 28.4 points per game
10. Richmond - 27.9 points per game
11. Iowa Pre-Flight - 27.7 points per game
12. Penn - 27.6 points per game

=== Individual leaders ===
==== Total offense ====
Rank	Player	Team	Games	Plays	Total Yds
1	Robert Hoernschemeyer	Indiana	10	355	1648
2	Eddie Prokop	Georgia Tech	10	269	1440
3	Johnny Cook	Georgia	10	307	1368
4	Stan Kozlowski	Holy Cross	8	252	1226
5	James Hallmark	Texas A&M	9	265	1080
6	Jim Lucas	TCU	8	258	1031
7	Glenn Davis	Army	10	144	1028
8	Steve Van Buren	LSU	8	186	1007
9	Derald Lebow	Oklahoma	9	192	951
10	Bill Maceyko	Cornell-Sampson	10	181	930

==== Rushing ====
Rank	Player	Team	Games	Rushes	Net Yds	Avg Gain per Play
1	Creighton Miller	Notre Dame	10	151	911	6.03
2	Steve Van Buren	LSU	8	150	847	5.65
3	Tony Butkovich	Purdue	9	142	833	5.87
4	Bill Daley	Michigan	9	120	817	6.81
5	Stan Kozlowski	Holy Cross	8	161	784	4.87
6	Eddie Bray	Illinois	10	117	738	6.31
7	Jim Mello	Notre Dame	10	137	704	5.14
8	Ernie Parks	Ohio State	9	161	693	4.30
9	Dean Sensanbaugher	Ohio State	9	150	677	4.51
10	Joe Kane	Penn	9	104	671	6.45

==== Passing ====
Rank	Player	Team	Games	Att.	Compl.	Int.	Pct. Compl.	Yds.
1	Paul Rickards	Pittsburgh	9	178	84	20	.472	997
2	Frank Dancewicz	Notre Dame	10	153	68	12	.444	989
3	Cashion	Texas A&M	11	113	59	12	.522	852
4	Bob Waterfield	UCLA	10	136	55	19	.404	901
5	Al Dekdebrun	Cornell	9	121	53	13	.438	648

== See also ==
- 1943 College Football All-America Team
- List of World War II military service football teams
