= Spot Collins =

American football player and coach (1922–1996)

William Harold "Spot" Collins
Profile
- Positions: Quarterback, linebacker, guard

Personal information
- Born: March 4, 1922; Breckenridge, Texas, U.S.
- Died: March 26, 1996 (aged 74); Temple, Texas, U.S.
- Listed height: 5 ft 8 in (1.73 m)
- Listed weight: 195 lb (88 kg)

Career information
- High school: Breckenridge High School
- College: Texas (1940–1942, 1947); Southwestern (TX) (1943)

Awards and highlights
- Second-team All-SWC (1946); 1942 2nd Team All-Southwest Conference; 1944 Sun Bowl MVP
- Stats at Pro Football Reference

Other information
- Coaching career

Coaching career (HC unless noted)
- 1948–1950: Southwestern (TX)

Head coaching record
- Overall: 9–10–2

William Harold "Spot" Collins (March 4, 1922 – March 26, 1996) (Sometimes "Bill Collins) was a college and professional football player and coach in the 1940s. He was a quarterback and guard who led the Texas Longhorns to their first bowl game; and – 28 miles (45 km) north of Austin, in Georgetown, during his military service – he led the Southwestern University Pirates to the 1944 Sun Bowl where he was the game's MVP. Collins played one year of professional football for the NFL's Boston Yanks in 1947 and was head football coach at Southwestern in 1948–49. He is one of only 14 NFL players to serve in both World War II and the Korean War.

== Early life ==
Spot Collins was a star in football, baseball and basketball at Breckenridge High School, which he attended from 1936 to 1940. He led the football team to a district championship in his senior year and was 2nd Team All-State the same year. When the season was over, he played in the annual Texas High School Football Coaches Association All-Star game.

== College football ==
Collins first attended the University of Texas in 1940 where, in his freshman year, he was captain of the "Shorthorn" football team – the freshman team. They went undefeated and won the unofficial conference championship.

In 1941, Collins played guard on the varsity and earned a letter despite missing the end of the season with a knee injury. That season marked the first time that a Texas team would ever be ranked No. 1 in the polls, if only for a week, before tying Baylor and losing to TCU in back to back weeks. The Longhorns finished 8–1–1 and ranked No. 4 in the country. It was the first time Texas ever finished the season ranked.

In 1942 Collins was moved to quarterback, which in the single-wing formation was also known as the "blocking back". The quarterback did not pass or handle the ball as much as they do in modern offenses, but did call the plays. On defense, he played linebacker. After starting slowly to allow his knee to heal, Collins took over the starting job from Joe Magliolo because he was seen as the better pass defender and the Longhorns started to play against more pass-oriented offenses in the Southwest Conference. He helped lead Texas to the conference title, a No. 11 ranking and their first bowl game, the 1943 Cotton Bowl. Collins was recognized as an All-Southwest Conference 2nd Team player as a back.

Following the 1942 season, Collins joined the Marine Corps and, along with eight other Longhorns, was sent to Southwestern University as part of the V-12 program. There he was captain of the most successful Pirates football team in school history, a team that beat Texas in Austin, was ranked as high as No. 11, and won the 1943 Sun Bowl, in which Collins was named MVP. Though the Texas Conference was officially disbanded during the war, the school considers themselves Texas Conference Champions that year.

Collins left college and football to go into service during World War II. He was a first lieutenant with the Sixth Marines at Okinawa and China.

In 1946, Collins returned to the University of Texas, but with Texas' transition to the t-formation, a blocking back was no longer needed, so he was moved back to offensive guard. Despite his years away from Austin, Collins was named co-captain of the football team as the Longhorns went 8–2. He was again recognized as an All-Southwest Conference 2nd Team player, this time as a guard.

Following the season, Collins played in the 1947 East-West all star game in San Francisco and the College All-Star game in Chicago.

== Professional football ==
In 1947, after getting a degree, Collins was selected in the third round of the 1947 AAFC Draft by the New York Yankees, but never played for them. Instead, he spent the 1947 season in the NFL with the Boston Yanks, for whom he played guard.

== Coaching and later life ==
With his professional football career over, Collins was hired as head football coach at Southwestern University in the spring of 1948. He coached the Pirates for two years, for a combined 9–10–2 record, before the school disbanded the program.

Shortly thereafter he left for the military again in 1951. He served in the Korean War as a Marine Captain, where he earned the Bronze Star Medal. He was one of only 14 NFL players to serve in both World War II and the Korean War.

After returning from the war, Collins served as the head coach at Vernon High School from 1952 to 1954, where his teams posted a combined record of 14–13–3. He earned a master's degree in education from Texas in 1954 and, after being dismissed from Vernon in 1955, entered the insurance industry in Austin in 1956 where he worked until his retirement.

Collins died on March 26, 1996, in Temple, Texas, and was buried at Austin Memorial Park Cemetery.

He was inducted into the Southwestern University Athletics Hall of Fame in 1997.

== Head coaching record ==
Year	Team	Overall	Conference	Standing	Bowl/playoffs
Southwestern Pirates (Texas Conference) (1948–1949)
1948	Southwestern	6–3	2–3	T–4th	
1949	Southwestern	3–7–2	0–4–1	6th	
Southwestern:		9–10–2	2–7–1		
Total:		9–10–2			

== Bibliography ==
=== References ===
- Bedichek, Roy, ed. (February 1940). "All-State Teams Have 5 Over 18" (PDF). Interscholastic Leaguer. Vol. 23, no. 6. Austin: Bureau of Extracurricular Activities, Extension Division, University of Texas. OCLC 8083183 – via University Interscholastic League.
- "Bill Collins". Pro Football Archives. Archived from the original on April 2, 2015.
- "Coaches Price and Callihan of Tivy and Weir of Schreiner Institute Attend Grid School". Kerrville Mountain Sun. Vol. 58, no. 37. Kerrville, Texas. August 8, 1940 – via Newspapers.com.
- Collins, William Harold (1954). An Analysis Through Motion Pictures of Defensive Patterns of Play of Seven Southwest Conference Opponents of the University of Texas in 1952 (Master thesis). University of Texas. OCLC 27304452. (includes vitae) – 86 Leaves of Tables
- "Football And America: The Korean War". Pro Football Hall of Fame. January 1, 2005.
- Grayson, Harry (November 14, 1942). "Collins, Magliolo Pave Way for Texas Speedmen; Bible Develops Blockers and Steers Roll Onward". Mount Carmel Item. Vol. 55, no. 12. Mount Carmel, Pennsylvania – via Newspapers.com.
- Kassen, Leo Tex; Munt, Glada Carole (2000). Southwestern Football Historical Review, 1908–1950 (PDF). Georgetown, Texas: Southwestern University. OCLC 46773530. Archived from the original (PDF) on September 24, 2015.
- "Miss Sunny Williams, Spot Collins to Wed in Austin December 20". Breckenridge American. Vol. 27, no. 269. Breckenridge, Texas. November 28, 1947 – via Portal to Texas History.
- "1947 AAFC Draft List Held December 20–21, 1946". Pro Football Archives.
- Ratliff, Harold Vernon (December 3, 1946). "Rice, Arkansas Put Three on All-Southwest Conference Team". Lubbock Morning Avalanche. Vol. 25, no. 23 – via Newspapers.com.
- "Roy McKay Heads All-Southwest 11". Yellow Jacket. Vol. 29, no. 11. Brownwood, Texas. December 4, 1942 – via Portal to Texas History.
- Smith, Joe Lee. "Coaches Records by Seasons: Brewer – Czarwitz". Texas High School Football History.
- "William Harold Collins". Southwestern Pirates.
- Williams, Johnny (July 31, 1946). "Spot Collins in Grid Limelight". Breckenridge American. Vol. 26, no. 144 – via Portal to Texas History.
