= 1943 Washington Huskies football team =

American college football season

1943 Washington Huskies football

Rose Bowl, L 0–29 vs. USC
- Conference: Pacific Coast Conference

Ranking
- AP: No. 12
- Record: 4–1 (0–1 PCC)
- Head coach: Ralph Welch (2nd season)
- Captain: Jack Tracy
- Home stadium: University of Washington Stadium

1943 Pacific Coast Conference football standings
	Conf.					Overall
Team	W		L		T	W		L		T
USC $	5	–	0	–	0	8	–	2	–	0
California	2	–	2	–	0	4	–	6	–	0
No. 12 Washington	0	–	1	–	0	4	–	1	–	0
UCLA	0	–	4	–	0	1	–	8	–	0
$ – Conference champion; Rankings from AP Poll

The 1943 Washington Huskies football team was an American football team that represented the University of Washington during the 1943 college football season. In its second season under head coach Ralph Welch, the team compiled a 4–1 record, finished in third place in the Pacific Coast Conference (PCC), was ranked twelfth in the final AP poll, lost to USC in the Rose Bowl, and outscored its opponents 150 to 61. Jack Tracy was the team captain.

In the final Litkenhous Ratings, Washington ranked 42nd among the nation's college and service teams with a rating of 85.2.

With manpower shortages on campuses due to World War II, the other five members of the PCC's Northern Division did not field teams this season (or the next); Washington's sole conference game was on New Year's Day in the Rose Bowl.

== Schedule ==
Date	Time	Opponent	Rank	Site	Result	Attendance	Source
September 25		Whitman*		University of Washington Stadium; Seattle, WA	W 35–6	10,000	
October 9	1:30 p.m.	at Spokane Air Service*		Gonzaga Stadium; Spokane, WA	W 47–12	9,000	
October 23		March Field*		University of Washington Stadium; Seattle, WA	W 27–7	18,000–24,000	
October 30		Spokane Air Service*	No. 11	University of Washington Stadium; Seattle, WA	W 41–7	5,000	
January 1, 1944		vs. USC	No. 12	Rose Bowl; Pasadena, CA (Rose Bowl)	L 0–29	68,000	
*Non-conference game; Rankings from AP Poll released prior to the game; All times are in Pacific time

== Rankings ==
Ranking movements Legend: ██ Increase in ranking ██ Decrease in ranking — = Not ranked ( ) = First-place votes
	Week								
Poll	1	2	3	4	5	6	7	8	Final
AP	—	19	—	11	11	12	11	11	12 (1)

== NFL draft selections ==
Four University of Washington Huskies were selected in the 1944 NFL draft, which lasted 32 rounds with 330 selections.

= Husky Hall of Fame

Player	Position	Round	Pick	NFL club
Al Akins	Back	6	10	Cleveland Rams
Jack Tracy	End	7	6	Green Bay Packers
Bob Erickson	Back	13	10	Cleveland Rams
Neil Brooks	Back	19	5	New York Giants
