= 1943 USC Trojans football team =

American college football season

1943 USC Trojans football

PCC champion Rose Bowl champion

Rose Bowl, W 29–0 vs. Washington
- Conference: Pacific Coast Conference
- Record: 8–2 (5–0 PCC)
- Head coach: Jeff Cravath (2nd season)
- Home stadium: Los Angeles Memorial Coliseum

1943 Pacific Coast Conference football standings
	Conf.					Overall
Team	W		L		T	W		L		T
USC $	5	–	0	–	0	8	–	2	–	0
California	2	–	2	–	0	4	–	6	–	0
No. 12 Washington	0	–	1	–	0	4	–	1	–	0
UCLA	0	–	4	–	0	1	–	8	–	0
$ – Conference champion; Rankings from AP Poll

The 1943 USC Trojans football team represented the University of Southern California (USC) in the 1943 college football season. In their second year under head coach Jeff Cravath, the Trojans compiled an 8–2 record (5–0 against conference opponents), won the Pacific Coast Conference championship, defeated Washington in the 1944 Rose Bowl, and outscored their opponents by a combined total of 155 to 58.

In the final Litkenhous Ratings, USC ranked 45th among the nation's college and service teams with a rating of 84.8.

== Schedule ==
Date	Opponent	Rank	Site	Result	Attendance	Source
September 25	at UCLA		Los Angeles Memorial Coliseum; Los Angeles, CA (Victory Bell)	W 20–0	50,000	
October 2	at California		California Memorial Stadium; Berkeley, CA	W 7–0	55,000	
October 9	St. Mary's Pre-Flight*	No. 10	Los Angeles Memorial Coliseum; Los Angeles, CA	W 13–0	30,000	
October 16	at San Francisco*	No. 8	Kezar Stadium; San Francisco, CA	W 34–0	6,000	
October 23	No. 6 Pacific (CA)*	No. 7	Los Angeles Memorial Coliseum; Los Angeles, CA	W 6–0	75,000	
October 30	No. 20 California	No. 5	Los Angeles Memorial Coliseum; Los Angeles, CA	W 13–0	30,000	
November 6	San Diego NTS*	No. 4	Hull Field; San Diego, CA	L 7–10	6,000	
November 13	No. 15 March Field*	No. 9	Los Angeles Memorial Coliseum; Los Angeles, CA	L 0–35	30,000	
November 27	UCLA^{†}		Los Angeles Memorial Coliseum; Los Angeles, CA	W 26–13	35,000	
January 1, 1944	vs. No. 12 Washington		Rose Bowl; Pasadena, CA (Rose Bowl)	W 29–0	68,000	
*Non-conference game; ^{†}Homecoming; Rankings from AP Poll released prior to the game; Source:

== Rankings ==
Ranking movements Legend: ██ Increase in ranking ██ Decrease in ranking — = Not ranked ( ) = First-place votes
	Week								
Poll	1	2	3	4	5	6	7	8	Final
AP	10	8	7 (2)	5	4 (2)	9	—	—	—
