= Southwestern Pirates football =

Football program representing Southwestern University

- First season: 1908; 118 years ago (Note: The program was discontinued after the 1950 season, then it was relaunched in 2013; 13 years ago.)
- Head coach: Bill Kriesel; 2nd season, 4–6 (.400)
- Location: Georgetown, Texas
- Stadium: Georgetown Stadium Complex (capacity: 11,000)
- Field: Bernard Birkelbach Field
- Conference: SAA (2023–present)
- Colors: Black and gold
- Bowl record: 2–0 (1.000)

Conference championships
- 2016
- Rivalries: Trinity University
- Mascot: Pirate
- Website: southwesternpirates.com/football

The Southwestern Pirates football team represents Southwestern University in National Collegiate Athletic Association (NCAA) intercollegiate football competition. After a brief period of prominence during the Second World War, the school disbanded its football program in April 1951 due to budgetary constraints.

On October 28, 2011, The Southwestern University board of trustees voted to reinstate the program. The Pirates football team resumed play in the Fall of 2013 as part of the NCAA Division III Southern Collegiate Athletic Conference.

In 2016, the final year that the Southern Collegiate Athletic Conference sponsored football, the Pirates posted a perfect 6–0 record in becoming undefeated conference champions. As a part of the championship the Pirates swept the conference's major post-season awards, including: Justin Broussard (defensive player of the year), Matt Gillen (co-offensive player of the year), Nik Kelly (special teams player of the year), Luke Fierst (newcomer of the year) and Joe Austin (coach of the year).

The football program competed in the American Southwest Conference as an affiliate member from 2017 to 2023. In the Fall 2023 season, Southwestern moved its football program to the Southern Athletic Association, with the rest of the school's sports following in 2025.

== History ==
Records show that football was played at Southwestern University as early as 1895, but the school's first officially recognized team was not formed until 1908. They were charter members of the Texas Intercollegiate Athletic Association along with Austin College and Trinity in 1908, and of the Southwest Conference in 1914. They then left the Southwest Conference prior to the 1918, but continued to compete within the TIAA until 1925, when the departure of Rice caused the TIAA to split. At that point, Southwestern helped form the Texas Conference along with Austin College, Howard Payne University, Simmons University (now Hardin–Simmons University), and Trinity University. Southwestern would remain in the Texas Conference until its football program was disbanded on April 27, 1951.

Prior to the 1940s, Southwestern was considered a "small time" football program, and only received national media attention about once yearly, whenever it faced a major college team. During the Second World War, however, Southwestern became a formidable football power because of its sponsorship of a V-12 Navy College Training Program, which was gained through the actions of then Texas Congressman Lyndon B. Johnson. The Navy program gave it a pool of experienced and skilled players, which was a competitive advantage over other teams that fielded men too young or physically unfit for military service. In 1943, Southwestern's team boasted seven former starters from Texas and varsity players formerly with Baylor. Despite the influx of stars, Southwestern still had to contend with players leaving midseason to report for military training.

During the 1943 season, Southwestern climbed as high as the eleventh-ranked team in the nation in the Associated Press Poll. Southwestern lost only one game during the season, and won the Sun Bowl against New Mexico, 7–0. After the 1944 season, the Sun Bowl invited Southwestern to return to face the National University of Mexico. Southwestern routed the Pumas, 35–0, to set a scoring record for the game before 13,000 spectators.

After the conclusion of the Second World War, and the concurrent disbandment of the military training programs on campus, Southwestern's football performance declined. Southwestern University disbanded its football team in April 1951 due to budget constraints.

== Reinstatement ==
On October 28, 2011, The Southwestern University board of trustees voted to reinstate the university's football program. The reinstatement was made possible by $6 million in gifts. $5 million was pledged by Joe Seeber, a 1963 Southwestern graduate. However, Seeber later withdrew his pledge. The other $1 million was donated by Red McCombs, who attended Southwestern and played football. “As the oldest university in Texas, we realize the importance many people place on football,” said university president Jake B. Schrum. “There are many bright young men who want to play football in college who find NCAA Division III appealing. It is important for us to be back in the game."

On February 27, 2012 Joe Austin was hired as the new head football coach at Southwestern. Austin came to Southwestern from Hanover College where he was the head coach for the 2008 through 2011 seasons. During that time Austin rebuilt a program that had suffered four consecutive losing seasons prior to his arrival. In just Austin's third season Hanover posted a 7–3 (6–2 Heartland Collegiate Conference) record while finishing second in the league. Austin's team finished second again in his fourth and final season of 2011. While at Hanover, Austin produced three NCAA statistical champions: Tyler Thiems (receptions per game) 2008, Correy Stewart (interceptions per game) 2009, and Daniel Passafiume (receptions per game) 2009.

The Pirates resumed play on September 7, 2013 with the first game a 44–14 loss to Texas Lutheran at the new Georgetown stadium complex, just up the road from the campus.

In just their fourth season of play the Pirates posted a 6–0 record in claiming the Southern Collegiate Athletic Conference championship. In 2017, the Pirates began play in the American Southwest Conference and moved to the Southern Athletic Association in 2023.

== Notable players ==
- Solon Barnett, NFL lineman
- Pete Cawthon, college and NFL head coach
- William "Spot" Collins, NFL lineman
- Doug Dashiell, Nevada head coach, 1936–1938
- Gwinn Henry, Kansas, New Mexico, and Missouri head coach
- Carlton Massey, NFL Pro Bowler
