= 1943 Southeastern Conference football season =

- Sport: Football
- Duration: September 17, 1943 – January 1, 1944
- Number of teams: 5
- Champion: Georgia Tech

SEC seasons
- ← 1942 1944 →

1943 Southeastern Conference football standings
	Conf.					Overall
Team		W		L			W		L
No. 13 Georgia Tech $	3	–	0	–	0	8	–	3	–	0
LSU	2	–	2	–	0	6	–	3	–	0
Tulane	1	–	1	–	0	3	–	3	–	0
Georgia	0	–	3	–	0	6	–	4	–	0
Vanderbilt	0	–	0	–	0	5	–	0	–	0
$ – Conference champion; Seven other SEC schools did not field a team due to World War II.; Rankings from AP Poll

The 1943 Southeastern Conference football season was the eleventh season of college football played by the member schools of the Southeastern Conference (SEC) and was a part of the 1943 college football season.Georgia Tech compiled an 8–3 overall record, with a conference record of 3–0, and was SEC champion. The 1943 season was notable for the suspension of football at Alabama, Auburn, Florida, Kentucky, Mississippi State, Ole Miss, and Tennessee due to Army restrictions during World War II.

== Results and team statistics ==
Conf. rank	Team	Head coach	Overall record	Conf. record	AP final	PPG	PAG
1	Georgia Tech	William Alexander	8–3–0 (.727)	3–0–0 (1.000)	No. 13	27.3	12.9
2	LSU	Bernie Moore	6–3–0 (.667)	2–2–0 (.500)		18.0	17.6
3	Tulane	Claude Simons Jr.	3–3–0 (.500)	1–1–0 (.500)		15.3	15.7
4	Georgia	Wally Butts	6–4–0 (.600)	0–3–0 (.000)		26.4	15.3
5	Vanderbilt	Ernest Alley	5–0–0 (1.000)	0–0–0 (–)		29.0	6.6

Key
AP final = Rankings from AP sports writers. See 1943 college football rankings
PPG = Average of points scored per game
PAG = Average of points allowed per game

== Schedule ==
Index to colors and formatting
SEC member won
SEC member lost
SEC member tie
SEC teams in **bold**

=== Week One ===
Date	Visiting team	Home team	Site	Result	Attendance	Ref.
September 17	Presbyterian	**Georgia**	Sanford Stadium • Athens, GA	**W** 25–7	6,000	

=== Week Two ===
Date	Visiting team	Home team	Site	Result	Attendance	Ref.
September 25	North Carolina	**Georgia Tech**	Grant Field • Atlanta, GA	**W** 20–7	20,000	
September 25	**Georgia**	**LSU**	Tiger Stadium • Baton Rouge, LA	**LSU** 34–27	20,000	

=== Week Three ===
Date	Visiting team	Home team	Site	Result	Attendance	Ref.
October 1	Tennessee Tech	**Georgia**	Sanford Stadium • Athens, GA	**W** 67–0		
October 2	Rice	**LSU**	Tiger Stadium • Baton Rouge, LA	**W** 20–7	22,000	
October 2	**Georgia Tech**	Notre Dame	Notre Dame Stadium • South Bend, IN	**L** 13–55	26,497–30,000	
October 2	Memphis NATTC	**Tulane**	Tulane Stadium • New Orleans, LA	**L** 7–41	25,000	

=== Week Four ===
Date	Visiting team	Home team	Site	Result	Attendance	Ref.
October 8	Wake Forest	**Georgia**	Sanford Stadium • Athens, GA	**W** 7–0	7,500	
October 9	Georgia Pre-Flight	**Georgia Tech**	Grant Field • Atlanta, GA	**W** 35–7	12,000	
October 9	**Tulane**	Rice	Rice Field • Houston, TX	**W** 33–0		
October 9	Texas A&M	No. 17 **LSU**	Tiger Stadium • Baton Rouge, LA (rivalry)	**L** 13–28	25,000	
^{#}Rankings from AP Poll released prior to game.

=== Week Five ===
Date	Visiting team	Home team	Site	Result	Attendance	Ref.
October 16	300th Infantry	**Georgia Tech**	Grant Field • Atlanta, GA	**W** 27–0	10,000	
October 16	Louisiana Army	**LSU**	Tiger Stadium • Baton Rouge, LA	**W** 28–7	3,500	
October 16	**Vanderbilt**	Tennessee Tech	Overall Field • Cookeville, TN	**W** 20–0		
October 16	**Georgia**	Daniel Field	Richmond Academy Stadium • Augusta, GA	**L** 7–18	5,000	
^{#}Rankings from AP Poll released prior to game.

=== Week Six ===
Date	Visiting team	Home team	Site	Result	Attendance	Ref.
October 23	SMU	**Tulane**	Tulane Stadium • New Orleans, LA	**W** 12–6	22,000	
October 23	Camp Campbell	**Vanderbilt**	Dudley Field • Nashville, TN	**W** 40–14	6,000	
October 23	**Georgia Tech**	No. 3 Navy	Municipal Stadium • Baltimore, MD	**L** 14–28	56,223	
October 23	**LSU**	**Georgia**	Memorial Stadium • Columbus, GA	**LSU** 27–6	13,000	
^{#}Rankings from AP Poll released prior to game.

=== Week Seven ===
Date	Visiting team	Home team	Site	Result	Attendance	Ref.
October 29	Howard (AL)	**Georgia**	Sanford Stadium • Athens, GA	**W** 39–0		
October 30	TCU	**LSU**	Tiger Stadium • Baton Rouge, LA	**W** 14–0	18,000	
October 30	Milligan	**Vanderbilt**	Dudley Field • Nashville, TN	**W** 26–6	3,000	
October 30	No. 8 Duke	**Georgia Tech**	Grant Field • Atlanta, GA	**L** 7–14	30,000	
October 30	Georgia Pre-Flight	**Tulane**	Tulane Stadium • New Orleans, LA	**L** 13–14	18,000	
^{#}Rankings from AP Poll released prior to game.

=== Week Eight ===
Date	Visiting team	Home team	Site	Result	Attendance	Ref.
November 5	Presbyterian	**Georgia**	Sanford Stadium • Athens, GA	**W** 39–0	4,000	
November 5	Carson–Newman	**Vanderbilt**	Dudley Field • Nashville, TN	**W** 12–6		
November 6	No. 10 **LSU**	**Georgia Tech**	Grant Field • Atlanta, GA	**GT** 42–7	20,000	
^{#}Rankings from AP Poll released prior to game.

=== Week Nine ===
Date	Visiting team	Home team	Site	Result	Attendance	Ref.
November 13	VMI	**Georgia**	Grant Field • Atlanta, GA	**W** 46–7	5,000	
November 13	No. 19 **Georgia Tech**	**Tulane**	Tulane Stadium • New Orleans, LA	**GT** 33–0	38,000	
^{#}Rankings from AP Poll released prior to game.

=== Week Ten ===
Date	Visiting team	Home team	Site	Result	Attendance	Ref.
November 20	Clemson	No. 15 **Georgia Tech**	Grant Field • Atlanta, GA (rivalry)	**W** 41–6	10,000	
November 20	**LSU**	**Tulane**	Tulane Stadium • New Orleans, LA (rivalry)	**TUL** 27–0	40,000	
^{#}Rankings from AP Poll released prior to game.

=== Week Eleven ===
Date	Visiting team	Home team	Site	Result	Attendance	Ref.
November 25	Tennessee Tech	**Vanderbilt**	Dudley Field • Nashville, TN	**W** 47–7	7,000	
November 27	**Georgia**	No. 14 **Georgia Tech**	Grant Field • Atlanta, GA (rivalry)	**GT** 48–0	28,000	
^{#}Rankings from AP Poll released prior to game.

=== Postseason ===
Date	Visiting team	Home team	Site	Result	Attendance	Ref.
January 1, 1944	No. 15 Tulsa	No. 13 **Georgia Tech**	Tulane Stadium • New Orleans, LA (Sugar Bowl)	**W** 20–18	69,134	
January 1, 1944	Texas A&M	**LSU**	Burdine Stadium • Miami, FL (Orange Bowl / rivalry)	**W** 19–14	30,000	
^{#}Rankings from AP Poll released prior to game.

== All-Americans ==
SEC players receiving All-American honors from at least one selector on the 1943 College Football All-America Team were:

- John Steber, Guard, Georgia Tech. (AAB; AP-1 [tackle]; UP-2; INS-1; NYS-1)
- Lester Gatewood, Center, Tulane (AP-3)
- Eddie Prokop, Halfback, Georgia Tech (AP-2; UP-2)
- Steve Van Buren, Halfback, LSU (AP-3)

== Head coaches ==
Records through the completion of the 1943 season

Team	Head coach	Years at school	Overall record	Record at school	SEC record
Georgia	Wally Butts	5	36–16–2 (.685)	36–16–2 (.685)	11–8–2 (.571)
Georgia Tech	William Alexander	24	126–92–15 (.573)	126–92–15 (.573)	29–31–5 (.485)
LSU	Bernie Moore	9	72–40–6 (.636)	60–28–3 (.676)	29–19–2 (.600)
Tulane	Claude Simons Jr.	2	18–20–1 (.474)	7–8–0 (.467)	2–5–0 (.286)
Vanderbilt	Ernest Alley	1	5–0–0 (1.000)	5–0–0 (1.000)	0–0–0 (–)

== 1944 NFL draft ==
The following SEC players were selected in the 1944 NFL draft:

Round	Overall Pick	Player name	School	Position	NFL team
1	5	Steve Van Buren	LSU	Halfback	Philadelphia Eagles
2	14	Bob Cifers	Tennessee	Back	Detroit Lions
2	16	Lamar Blount	Mississippi State	Back	New York Giants
5	43	Larry Rice	Tulane	Center	Boston Yanks
6	52	Hillary Horne	Mississippi State	Tackle	Philadelphia Eagles
9	78	Mitchell Olenski	Alabama	Tackle	Brooklyn Tigers
9	87	Tex Warrington	Auburn	Center	Boston Yanks
11	103	Carl Grate	Georgia	Guard	New York Giants
12	117	J. P. Moore	Vanderbilt	Back	Chicago Bears
13	125	Ray Poole	Ole Miss	End	New York Giants
13	126	Bill Baughman	Alabama	Center	Green Bay Packers
13	127	Charley Walker	Kentucky	Center	Washington Redskins
14	136	Bert Corley	Mississippi State	Center	New York Giants
14	139	Joe Hartley	LSU	Tackle	Chicago Bears
14	140	Jim Talley	LSU	Center	Philadelphia Eagles
15	144	Billy J. Murphy	Mississippi State	Back	Brooklyn Tigers
15	147	Ollie Poole	Ole Miss	End	New York Giants
15	149	Jim Gaffney	Tennessee	Back	Washington Redskins
15	151	Jim Myers	Tennessee	Guard	Card-Pitt
15	152	Bud Hubbell	Tennessee	End	Cleveland Rams
17	167	Jack Helms	Georgia Tech	Tackle	Detroit Lions
17	172	Ed Ryckeley	Georgia Tech	End	Chicago Bears
17	174	Aubrey Clayton	Auburn	Back	Cleveland Rams
18	186	Reldon Bennett	LSU	Tackle	Boston Yanks
19	189	Bill Eubank	Mississippi State	End	Detroit Lions
19	192	Kermit Davis	Mississippi State	End	Green Bay Packers
19	193	Clyde Ehrhardt	Georgia	Center	Washington Redskins
21	210	Mike Mihalic	Mississippi State	Guard	Brooklyn Tigers
22	221	Ted Cook	Alabama	End	Brooklyn Tigers
23	240	Jim Pharr	Auburn	Center	Cleveland Rams
23	241	Dilton Richmond	LSU	End	Boston Yanks
24	251	Joe Warlick	Mississippi State	Back	Cleveland Rams
26	273	Charley Kuhn	Kentucky	Back	Cleveland Rams
26	274	Bill Portwood	Kentucky	End	Boston Yanks
27	279	Andy Bires	Alabama	End	New York Giants
27	282	Jack McKewan	Alabama	End	Chicago Bears
28	291	A. B. Howard	Mississippi State	End	Green Bay Packers
29	298	Marty Frohm	Mississippi State	Tackle	Brooklyn Tigers
29	306	John Hughes	Mississippi State	End	Cleveland Rams
30	317	Dick McPhee	Georgia	Back	Cleveland Rams
30	318	Gus Letchas	Georgia	Back	Boston Yanks
31	323	Jim McLeod	LSU	End	Cleveland Rams

== See also ==
- 1943 Alabama Informals football team
