= 1943 Alabama Informals football team =

American college football season

1943 Alabama Informals football
- Conference: Southeastern Conference
- Record: 0–0 (0–0 SEC)
- Head coach: Frank Thomas

1943 Southeastern Conference football standings
	Conf.					Overall
Team		W		L			W		L
No. 13 Georgia Tech $	3	–	0	–	0	8	–	3	–	0
LSU	2	–	2	–	0	6	–	3	–	0
Tulane	1	–	1	–	0	3	–	3	–	0
Georgia	0	–	3	–	0	6	–	4	–	0
Vanderbilt	0	–	0	–	0	5	–	0	–	0
$ – Conference champion; Seven other SEC schools did not field a team due to World War II.; Rankings from AP Poll

The 1943 Alabama Crimson Tide football team was to represent the University of Alabama in the 1943 college football season; however, the season was canceled due to the effects of World War II. In February 1943, the Army instituted a policy that prohibited their cadets from participation in intercollegiate athletics. Unsure if a season would occur, head coach Frank Thomas proceeded through spring practice as if it would be played. By summer, only two Alabama players were available to compete on the squad as a result of the Army prohibition on its trainees competing in intercollegiate athletics, and on August 23, 1943, the University announced its decision to cancel the 1943 season. The cancellation marked only the third time since the inaugural 1892 season that Alabama did not field a football team.

Although not officially sanctioned by the University, an independent team called the Alabama Informals was organized in October 1943. Coached by former Crimson Tide player Mitchell Olenski, the Informals were composed of 17-year-old and draft deferred students ineligible for military service. The Informals were allowed to play their games at Denny Stadium and utilize the equipment of the Crimson Tide football team. The squad lost to Howard, defeated the Marion Military Institute twice and finished the season with an overall record of two wins and one loss (2–1).

At the conclusion of the season, SEC officials met in an effort to bring a full football schedule back for the 1944 season. By May 1944, all SEC schools, with the exception of Vanderbilt, indicated they would field teams for the 1944 season. Football officially returned on September 30, 1944, when the Crimson Tide played LSU to a tie in their season opener.

== 1943 Crimson Tide ==
In February 1943, the United States Department of War announced they would take over both classroom space and athletic facilities at 271 colleges and universities to be utilized for the training of United States Army soldiers. As part of the Department's order, only students under 18 years of age or those with 4-F draft classifications were permitted to compete in intercollegiate athletics. At the time of the announcement, coach Thomas was quoted as saying:

"Army–Navy programs not figured at all in our plans for athletics next fall."

As such, preparations continued towards fielding a team for the 1943 season. On March 8, spring practice commenced at Denny Stadium and 55 student-athletes reported the first day. At that time coach Thomas acknowledged he did not know how many of his players would be eligible to play in the fall due to rules the prohibited active-duty servicemen playing intercollegiate football. As they entered practice, only 15 lettermen returned to the squad from the 1942 team. These players included: Jack Aland, Johnny August, Bill Baughman, Andy Bires, Charley Compton, Ted Cook, Leon Fichman, Ted McKosky, Jim McWhorter, Norman Mosley, Mitchell Olenski, Kenny Reese, Lou Scales, John Staples and Don Whitmire. Two weeks into the practices, coach Thomas held the first scrimmage of the spring on March 22.

On March 26, Herbert Chapman, Billy DeWitt, James Grantham, Henry "Red" Jones, Jim McWhorter and Lou Scales became the first Alabama players to be called into active duty from the enlisted reserve corps. As they were now enlisted as active servicemen, they were all ineligible to play in the fall for the Crimson Tide. In June, the SEC developed a plan to allow its member schools to discontinue athletic teams due to the war efforts, but retain the overall structure of the conference.

By August, the prospect of Alabama fielding a football team for the 1943 season was in doubt. On August 17, coach Thomas spoke to a civic group in Birmingham and stated he did not think the school would field a team in 1943 due to the unwillingness of the Army to change their policy that prohibited their cadets from participating in intercollegiate athletics. On August 23, 1943, the University Physical Education and Athletics Committee officially canceled the 1943 season. The decision was made at that time because only two Alabama players were available to compete on the squad. As the season was canceled, coach Thomas spent his time leading war bond drives and serving as president of the Tuscaloosa Exchange Club during the time the season was originally scheduled. The cancellation marked only the third time since 1892 that Alabama did not field a football team. The only other seasons the Crimson Tide did not field teams were in 1898 due to University policy that prohibited athletic teams from traveling off campus to compete and again in 1918 due to the effects of World War I.

=== Schedule ===
At the time of the cancellation of the season, Alabama had four games scheduled: a pair against LSU, and one each against Tulane and Georgia.

Date	Opponent	Site	Result
September 25	at LSU	Tiger Stadium; Baton Rouge, Louisiana (rivalry)	N/A
October 16	at Tulane	Tulane Stadium; New Orleans	N/A
October 23	Georgia	Legion Field; Birmingham, Alabama	N/A
November 13	LSU	Legion Field; Birmingham, Alabama (rivalry)	N/A

=== NFL draft ===
Several players that were varsity lettermen from the 1942 squad, scheduled to play as part of the 1943 team, were drafted into the National Football League (NFL) in the 1944 draft. These players included the following:

Year	Round	Overall	Player name	Position	NFL team
1944	9	78	Mitchell Olenski	Tackle	Brooklyn Tigers
1944	9	82	Don Whitmire	Tackle	Green Bay Packers
1944	22	221	Ted Cook	End	Brooklyn Tigers
1944	27	279	Andy Bires	End	New York Giants
1944	27	281	Jack McKewan	Tackle	Chicago Bears

== Alabama Informals ==
1943 Alabama Informals football
- Conference: Independent
- Record: 2–1
- Head coach: Mitchell Olenski (1st season)
- Home stadium: Denny Stadium

Although Alabama officially did not participate as part of the 1943 college football season, a team composed of 17-year old and draft deferred students was organized as the Alabama Informals in October 1943. Not officially sanctioned by the University, the Informals were allowed to utilize both equipment and the facilities of the Crimson Tide. The team was led by head coach Mitchell Olenski, and John Gresham and Al Alois served as assistant coaches. At the time of its creation, the Alabama Informals squad was the second created by a SEC school forced to abandon their football team for the year after Vanderbilt.

=== Schedule ===
In addition to the three games played, the Informals were also scheduled to compete against Draper Prison at the Cramton Bowl on November 27. The game was canceled by University officials that stated the students on the team needed to focus on final examinations instead.

Date	Opponent	Site	Result	Attendance
November 6	Howard (AL)	Denny Stadium; Tuscaloosa, AL	L 6–42	7,000
November 12	at Marion	Perry County H.S. Stadium; Marion, AL	W 31–12	
November 20	Marion	Denny Stadium; Tuscaloosa, AL	W 19–13	

=== Game summaries ===
==== Howard (AL) ====
Team	1	2	3	4	Total
• Howard	14	7	7	14	42
Alabama	0	0	0	6	6

- Date: November 6
- Location: Denny Stadium
  Tuscaloosa, Alabama
- Game attendance: 7,000

The Informals first opponent was a team composed of players that were part of the V-12 Navy College Training Program at Howard College (now Samford University). In the game, the Seadogs won 42–6 with the majority of gate receipts collected for the Tuscaloosa Service Center War Chest. The Howard squad featured two former Crimson Tide players: Bill Harris at tackle and Billy Dabbs at fullback.

Howard scored six touchdowns in the game. Cecil Duffee and Billy Dabbs scored on runs of 19 and 16-yards in the first quarter; Duffee scored on a 34-yard reception from Tris Mock in the second quarter; Stephenson scored on an eight-yard run in the third quarter; and Charley Spier scored on a 40-yard interception return in the fourth quarter. The only Alabama points of the contest came in the fourth quarter, down 35–0 when John Wade threw a 10-yard touchdown pass to Barton Greer. Although not included as part of Alabama's all-time record, this is the only loss Alabama ever had against Howard.

==== At Marion ====
Team	1	2	3	4	Total
• Alabama	6	6	12	7	31
Marion	0	6	0	6	12

- Date: November 12
- Location: Perry County H.S. Stadium
  Marion, Alabama

After their loss against Howard, the Informals traveled to play the Marion Military Institute Cadets at Perry County High School Stadium. Against the Cadets, Alabama scored at least one touchdown in all four quarters for the 31–12 victory. The Informals scored first on an 80-yard Barton Greer touchdown run, only to see the Cadets tie the game at 6–6 on the next possession on a 40-yard touchdown pass. Alabama responded with a 20-yard touchdown run on a reverse by Whitey Blanchiak to take a 12–6 halftime lead. In the third quarter, the Informals extended their lead to 24–6 after Lowell Edmondson scored on a 35-yard touchdown pass from Greer and on a four-yard Frank MacAlpine touchdown run in the third quarter. In the fourth, Greer scored on a run for Alabama and Marion scored the final points of the game on a punt returned for a touchdown in their 31–12 loss.

==== Marion ====
Team	1	2	3	4	Total
Marion	13	0	0	0	13
• Alabama	0	12	7	0	19

- Date: November 20
- Location: Denny Stadium
  Tuscaloosa, Alabama

After their victory over Marion, the Informals defeated the Cadets for the second consecutive week at Denny Stadium 19–13. After they took a 7–0 lead on an 85-yard drive, the Cadets extended it to 13–0 by the end of the first quarter when Jimmy Scruggs scored on a touchdown reception. The Informals responded with a pair of second-quarter touchdowns to make the halftime score 13–12. Touchdowns were scored on a Frank MacAlpine run and on a 21-yard Whitey Blanchiak reception from Barton Greer. Alabama then scored the go-ahead touchdown in the third quarter on a 55-yard interception return for a touchdown.

=== Roster ===
Alabama Informals 1943 roster
Quarterbacks: Farris Deep; Tom Edwards; Dwight Evens; Sam Oliveri; Running backs: Whitey Blanciak; Jim Callahan; Don Dahlene; Lowell Edmondson; Barton Greer; Joe Marion; Frank McAlpine; Billy Mills; John Wade; Bob Woolridge	Ends: Pete Crow; Herman Dow; Al Judd; Bill Monheimer; William Stanton; Tackles: George Kachickas; Carl Licht; Read Northern; Nick Terlizzi; Joe Triolo; Guards: Oscar Jones; Shorty Lackie; Lorrin Loeb; Bob Okin; Gus Ross; Art Sizemore	Center: Bert Bertini; Hudon Conway; Coaching staff: Mitchell Olenski – Head coach; Al Alois – Assistant coach; John Gresham – Assistant coach

== Aftermath ==
On December 10, 1943, SEC officials met in Nashville in an effort to bring a full football schedule back for the 1944 season. In order to have enough students eligible to participate on a team, the SEC changed its eligibility restrictions to allow for any civilian to play as long as they had not played four years of college football or professionally. At that time, Alabama along with Tennessee and Vanderbilt indicated they might reform their respective teams and resume conference play for the 1944 season. On January 12, 1944, all SEC members, with the exceptions of Mississippi and Mississippi State, indicated their intent to field football teams the following fall. On May 19, 1944, every SEC school with the exception of Vanderbilt (who fielded an informal team) agreed to play a full conference schedule the following fall. Football officially returned to Alabama for the first time since the 1942 season on September 30, 1944, when the Crimson Tide played LSU to a tie in their season opener.
