= List of Tulane Green Wave head baseball coaches =

The Tulane Green Wave college baseball team represents Tulane University in the American Athletic Conference (AAC). The Green Wave compete as part of the National Collegiate Athletic Association Division I. The team has had 24 head coaches since it started playing organized baseball in the 1893 season.

== Key ==
General
#	Number of coaches (Note: A running total of the number of head coaches.)
GC	Games coached
†	Elected to the National College Baseball Hall of Fame

Overall
OW	Wins
OL	Losses
OT	Ties
O%	Winning percentage

Conference (Note: Tulane was a member of the Southern Intercollegiate Athletic Association from 1897 until 1919, but the conference did not sponsor baseball. The Southern Conference, of which Tulane was a member from 1923 until 1932, did not sponsor baseball until 1947. Tulane was a member of the Southeastern Conference from 1933 to 1966 and the Metro Conference two times from 1975 until 1995. Tulane was a member of Conference USA from 1996 until 2014. Since 2015, Tulane has been a member of the American Athletic Conference.)
CW	Wins
CL	Losses
CT	Ties
C%	Winning percentage

Postseason (Note: Postseason play involving the NCAA Division I Baseball Championship.)
PA	Total Appearances (Note: Postseason appearances include seasons with NCAA Division I Baseball Championship bids since the tournament began in 1947.)
PW	Total Wins
PL	Total Losses
WA	College World Series appearances (Note: College World Series appearances include seasons with CWS bids since the tournament began in 1947.)
WW	College World Series wins
WL	College World Series losses

Championships
DC	Division regular season
CC	Conference regular season
CT	Conference tournament (Note: The Metro Conference began a baseball tournament in 1976. Conference USA began a baseball tournament in 1996. The American Athletic Conference began a baseball tournament in 2014.)

== Coaches ==
List of head baseball coaches showing season(s) coached, overall records, conference records, postseason records, championships and selected awards*Statistics correct as of the end of the 2019 NCAA Division I baseball season
#	Name	Term (Note: Tulane did not sponsor a baseball team in 1895–1896, 1908–09, 1917–18, 1920–22, 1931 and 1933–36.)	GC	OW	OL	OT	O%	CW	CL	CT	C%	PA	PW	PL	WA	WW	WL	DCs	CCs	CTs	NCs	Awards (Note: National, regional and conference coach of the year awards.)
1	J. P. Clinton	1893–1894	5	4	1	0	.800	—	—	—	—	—	—	—	—	—	—	—	—	—	0	—
2	F. B. Manis	1897–1898	13	7	6	0	.538	—	—	—	—	—	—	—	—	—	—	—	—	—	0	—
3	Thomas Willis	1903–1905	36	20	16	0	.556	—	—	—	—	—	—	—	—	—	—	—	—	—	0	—
4	J. Richard	1906–1907	41	20	21	0	.488	—	—	—	—	—	—	—	—	—	—	—	—	—	0	—
5	Bruce Hays	1911–1915, 1923	66	22	41	3	.356	—	—	—	—	—	—	—	—	—	—	—	—	—	0	—
6	John Gondolfi	1919	9	6	3	0	.667	—	—	—	—	—	—	—	—	—	—	—	—	—	0	—
7	Claude Simons Sr.	1924–1927	39	13	26	0	.333	—	—	—	—	—	—	—	—	—	—	—	—	—	0	—
8	Peggy Flournoy	1928	12	3	9	0	.250	—	—	—	—	—	—	—	—	—	—	—	—	—	0	—
9	Ted Bank	1930, 1932	17	0	17	0	.000	—	—	—	—	—	—	—	—	—	—	—	—	—	0	—
10	Bill Vegan	1937	4	0	4	0	.000	0	4	0	.000	—	—	—	—	—	—	—	0	—	0	—
11	Claude Simons Jr.	1938–1941, 1943–1949	160	92	68	0	.575	24	30	0	.444	0	0	0	0	0	0	—	1	—	0	—
12	Bobby Kellog	1942	11	2	9	0	.182	2	6	0	.250	—	—	—	—	—	—	—	0	—	0	—
13	John Reed	1950–1951	44	12	22	1	.357	8	13	1	.386	0	0	0	0	0	0	—	0	—	0	—
14	Dennis Vinzant	1952–1954	60	37	22	1	.625	29	17	1	.628	0	0	0	0	0	0	—	0	—	0	—
15	Ben Abadie	1955–1957, 1964–1966	133	70	62	1	.530	33	51	0	.393	0	0	0	0	0	0	—	0	—	0	—
16	Mel Parnell	1958	33	4	18	0	.182	2	13	0	.133	0	0	0	0	0	0	—	0	—	0	—
17	Bob Whitman	1959	15	6	9	0	.400	5	8	0	.385	0	0	0	0	0	0	—	0	—	0	—
18	Jack Orsley	1960–1961	34	6	28	0	.176	3	23	0	.115	0	0	0	0	0	0	—	0	—	0	—
19	Doug Hafner	1962–1963	184	10	35	2	.234	6	24	1	.210	0	0	0	0	0	0	—	0	—	0	—
20	Milt Retif	1967–1974	196	123	73	0	.628	—	—	—	–	0	0	0	0	0	0	—	—	—	0	—
21	Joe Brockhoff	1975–1993	993	641	350	2	.647	66	71	0	.482	7	7	14	0	0	0	—	1	3	0	—
22	Rick Jones	1994–2014	1129	827	457	2	.644	324	207	2	.610	12	28	26	2	2	4	—	4	5	0	CUSA (1997, 2001, 05); BA (2005)
23	David Pierce	2015–2016	122	76	46	0	.623	28	16	0	.636	2	6	8	0	0	0	—	1	0	0	—
24	Travis Jewett	2017–present	174	84	90	0	.483	34	36	0	.486	0	0	0	0	0	0	—	0	0	0	—
