= C. B. Stanley =

American football player (1919–1977)

- Stanley in December 1943 preparing for the 1944 Sugar Bowl

No. 46
- Position: Tackle

Personal information
- Born: January 25, 1919; Holdenville, Oklahoma, U.S.
- Died: April 30, 1977 (aged 58); Tulsa, Oklahoma, U.S.
- Listed height: 6 ft 4 in (1.93 m)
- Listed weight: 225 lb (102 kg)

Career information
- High school: Holdenville
- College: Tulsa (1939, 1943-1945)
- NFL draft: 1944: 6th round, 51st overall pick

Career history
- Buffalo Bisons (1946)

Career AAFC statistics
- Games played: 13
- Games started: 11
- Stats at Pro Football Reference

Clair B. Stanley (January 25, 1919 – April 1977) was an American football tackle.

Stanley was born in Holdenville, Oklahoma, and attended Holdenville High School. He played college football for Tulsa from 1943 to 1945. He was a key player on the 1943 Tulsa Golden Hurricane football team that won the Missouri Valley Conference championship and played in the 1944 Sugar Bowl. He was also the captain of the 1945 Tulsa team that was ranked No. 17 in the final AP Poll. Stanley received a bachelor's degree in business administration from Tulsa in May 1946. He was invited to play in the Chicago College All-Star Game in August 1946.

Stanley was drafted by the Chicago Bears in the sixth round (51st overall pick) of the 1944 NFL draft, but did not play for the Bears. He instead played professional football in the All-America Football Conference for the Buffalo Bisons in 1946. He appeared in 13 games, 11 as a starter.

Stanley died in 1977 in Tulsa, Oklahoma.
