= Eddie Prokop =

American football player (1922–1955)

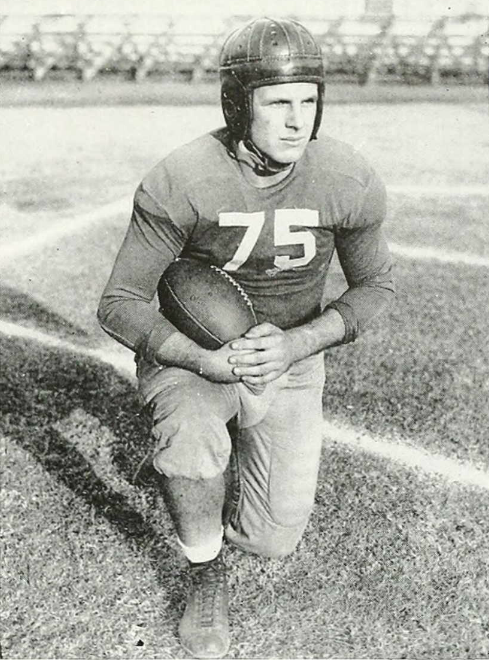
- Prokop from The 1944 Blue Print

No. 72, 70
- Position: Back

Personal information
- Born: February 11, 1922; Cleveland, Ohio, U.S.
- Died: May 30, 1955 (aged 33); Cleveland, Ohio, U.S.
- Listed height: 5 ft 11 in (1.80 m)
- Listed weight: 200 lb (91 kg)

Career information
- High school: Notre Dame-Cathedral Latin School (Chardon, Ohio)
- College: Georgia Tech
- NFL draft: 1945: 1st round, 4th overall pick

Career history
- New York Yankees (1946-1947); Chicago Rockets (1948); Brooklyn-New York Yankees (1949)

Awards and highlights
- Second-team All-American (1943); First-team All-SEC (1943)

Career NFL statistics
- Rushing yards: 935
- Rushing average: 4.1
- Receptions: 16
- Receiving yards: 361
- Total touchdowns: 14
- Stats at Pro Football Reference

Edward Stanley Prokop (February 11, 1922 – May 30, 1955), he was an American professional football player. He played college football at the Georgia Institute of Technology and in the National Football League (NFL) in the 1940s. He was the first pick (4th overall) in the 1945 NFL draft for the Boston Yanks.

== College career ==
Prokop played college football at Georgia Tech under coach William Alexander and was a 1969 Hall of Fame inductee there. In the 1944 Sugar Bowl Prokop led his #13 Yellow Jackets to 20–18 victory over #15 ranked Tulsa. In that game he rushed for 199 yards, threw a touchdown and kicked two extra points. The Sugar Bowl did not award a game MVP until 1948.

== Professional career ==
Prokop was the fourth overall pick of the 1945 NFL draft, selected by the Boston Yanks, and played for them in the 1946 and 1947 seasons. He played for the Chicago Rockets in the All-America Football Conference (AAFC) in 1948, and then returned to the Yanks, who became the New York Bulldogs in 1949, his final season as a professional.

== After football ==
After his playing days, Prokop was a sales engineer for National Solvent Corp. in Cleveland.

== Death ==
At age 33 in 1955, Prokop suffered a cerebral hemorrhage, originally thought to be heat exhaustion, at his Cleveland home. He died later that day at Huron Road Hospital.

== See also ==
- List of Georgia Tech Yellow Jackets starting quarterbacks
