= Martin Ruby =

American football player (1922–2002)

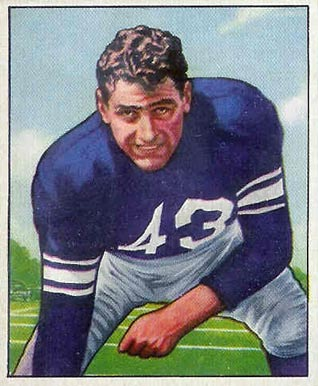

No. 43, 40, 47, 36, 63
- Position: Tackle

Personal information
- Born: June 9, 1920; Lubbock, Texas, U.S.
- Died: January 3, 2002 (aged 81); Salmon Arm, British Columbia, Canada
- Listed height: 6 ft 4 in (1.93 m)
- Listed weight: 249 lb (113 kg)

Career information
- High school: Waco (Waco, Texas)
- College: Texas A&M (1938–1941)
- NFL draft: 1942: 5th round, 40th overall pick

Career history

Playing
- Brooklyn Dodgers (1946–1948); Brooklyn-New York Yankees (1949); New York Yanks (1950); Saskatchewan Roughriders (1951–1957)

Coaching
- Saskatchewan Roughriders (1952) Line coach

Awards and highlights
- 2× Second-team All-AAFC (1946–1947); 4× CFL West All-Star (1951, 1953, 1954, 1956); National champion (1939); First-team All-SWC (1941)

Career NFL/AAFC statistics
- Games played: 65
- Games started: 55
- Fumble recoveries: 2
- Stats at Pro Football Reference
- Canadian Football Hall of Fame

Martin Owen Ruby (June 9, 1922 – January 3, 2002) was an offensive tackle and defensive tackle for the New York Yankees and the Brooklyn Dodgers in the All-America Football Conference (AAFC), New York Yanks of the National Football League (NFL), and the Saskatchewan Roughriders of the Western Interprovincial Football Union (WIFU). He lived in Waco, Texas, while he was a professional player.

== College career ==
He attended Texas A&M University, where he was a left tackle who wore #74. His first year as a varsity player was 1940. He weighed 255 pounds. and 6'4". Ruby was named the outstanding lineman in the Southwest Conference in 1941. That year, he led the Aggies to their second straight Cotton Bowl Classic appearance against Fordham University. In 1942 Texas A&M played the University of Alabama in the Cotton Bowl Classic.

Ruby played left tackle for the South All-Stars who defeated the North, 24–7, in the North–South football game, on December 30, 1944. He was named captain of the Gray squad for the Blue–Gray Football Classic in December 1945. Ruby was selected as the captain of the College All-Stars for the 1946 College All-Star Game. The All-Stars played the Los Angeles Rams at Soldier Field, in August. Ruby placed second to Elroy Hirsch of the University of Wisconsin–Madison in voting for the most valuable player in the game. The All-Stars defeated the Rams 16–0.

== Military service ==
He was sworn into the service at halftime of the 1942 Cotton Bowl Classic. Ruby spent four and a half years in the Army Air Force. He attained the rank of captain, was awarded a Presidential Citation, and two battle stars.

In December 1944 Ruby was a tackle for the Randolph Field Ramblers, the best service team in Texas during World War II. They played the Second Air Force Superbombers of Colorado Springs in the Treasury Bond Bowl, at the Polo Grounds. He also played for the Hawaiian Flyers in 1945. World War II gave Ruby a third chance to play in the Cotton Bowl Classic, and an opportunity to defeat the University of Texas, which Texas A&M had not beaten since 1939. The Randolph Field Ramblers played the Texas Longhorns in the Cotton Bowl Classic.

== Professional career ==
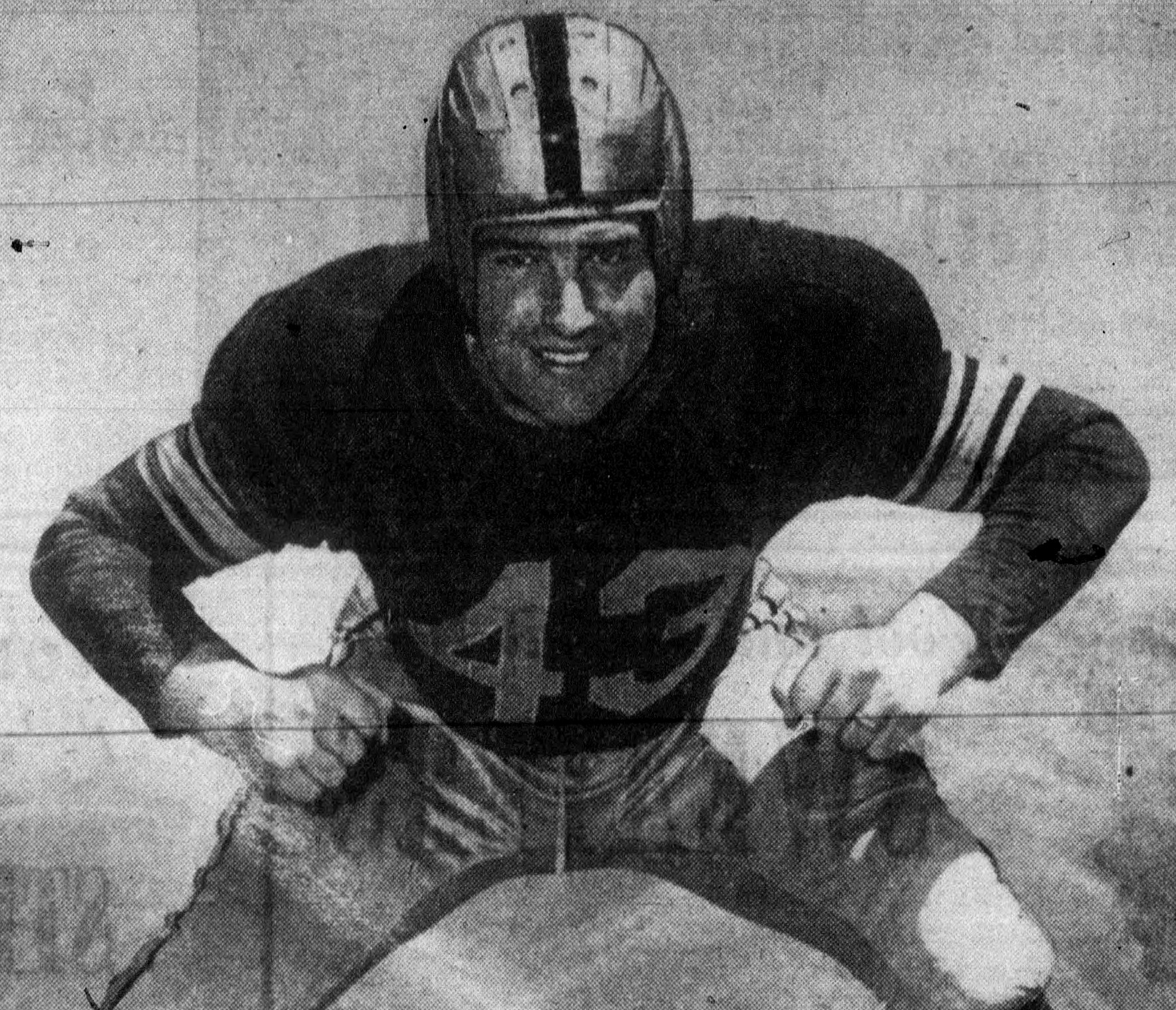
Ruby, circa 1947

=== All-America Football Conference ===
Ruby was selected by the Chicago Bears in the fifth round of the annual draft of college football players, in Chicago, on December 22, 1941. He played his first professional game for the Brooklyn Dodgers against the Cleveland Browns. The Browns won 26–7 at Cleveland Stadium on October 6, 1946. Ruby helped account for the Dodgers' only score by recovering a Cliff Lewis fumble on the Browns' 6-yard-line, in the 3rd Quarter. Ruby recovered an Andy Dudish fumble early in the 1st Quarter during a November loss to the Buffalo Bisons. Ruby was named to the 1946 All-Pro second-team picked by the Associated Press, on December 12. He was chosen, along with Bruiser Kinard, as one of two outstanding tackles named to the 1946 United Press All-America Conference All-Star Team.

Ruby signed a three-year contract with Dodgers' general manager, Freddie Fitzsimmons, in March 1947. He had surgery for floating cartilage in his right knee at St. Vincent's Hospital, in December 1948. The Dodgers and New York Yankees merged in January 1949, reducing the AAFC to seven teams. The Yankee-Dodger aggregation played its home games in Yankee Stadium. Ruby scored a touchdown against the Buffalo Bills (AAFC) in September 1949. In a Brooklyn-New York 17–14 win, Frank Perantoni batted down a pass thrown by George Ratterman, at Civic Stadium. Ruby caught the ball and ran four yards into the end zone.

=== National Football League ===
The AAFC folded following the 1949 season. The Browns, 49ers, and Colts moved into the NFL for the 1950 season. The remainder of the AAFC players were taken by the NFL via draft. The New York Bulldogs changed their name to the New York Yanks. Ruby signed with the Yanks in 1950 as one of the players the team received from the AAFC Yankees.

In October 1950 Ruby sacked Quarterback Frankie Albert of the San Francisco 49ers for a safety near halftime of a game at Yankee Stadium. New York won the game, 29–24, in a come from behind victory. Ruby jarred the ball from Tobin Rote of the Green Bay Packers during an October 20 contest in New York. The ball was recovered for a 1st Quarter touchdown by Jack Russell of the Yanks.

=== Western Interprovincial Football Union ===
In July 1951 Yanks' owner, Ted Collins, initiated legal action against Ruby and guard George Brown. Both had signed contracts to play in Canada.

One of Ruby's opponents, Edmonton Eskimos quarterback Jackie Parker, was a rookie out of the University of Tennessee. He reflected about his fear of Ruby in a 1972 Winnipeg Free Press article. Parker's coach, Pop Ivy, instructed his staff to study film in hopes of finding a weakness in Ruby's game. The coaches found a tendency in the way Ruby positioned his left foot when he lined up in a three point stance. When he intended to come straight ahead the tackle placed his left foot forward. When he wanted to cut left he positioned his left foot back. One of Parker's teammates, Johnny Bright, did not think the advance scouting of Ruby helped the Eskimos very much. After getting smashed for a loss by Ruby, Bright grumbled in the huddle, I guess we gotta learn to live with him.

Ruby was ejected from a September 1951 game with the Winnipeg Blue Bombers for slugging Dick Pinkston near the end of the first half.

Ruby was selected as one of six Roughriders named to the 1956 Canadian Press Western Interprovincial Football Union All-StarTeam. Players were chosen by football writers and coaches in the league cities. Ruby and a teammate, defensive back Larry Isbell, barely missed taking an ill-fated Vancouver to Montreal Trans-Canada Airlines plane which experienced engine failure above Hope, British Columbia, on December 10, 1956. They had tickets on the following flight to Montreal after passing on the earlier flight.

The missing plane's pilot turned back at Princeton, British Columbia, while facing snow and ice. The Trans Canada airliner, carrying 62 people, went down in the Chilliwack Mountain region of British Columbia. Ruby had just finished playing in the East–West All-Star Game.

He was inducted into the Canadian Football Hall of Fame in 1974.

== Coach ==
In January 1965, Ruby was named head line coach by the University of Tulsa. He had coached earlier at Baylor University and Texas A&M University.
