= Frank Tritico =

American football coach

- Tritico in 1944

Biographical details
- Born: March 25, 1909; Lake Charles, Louisiana, U.S.
- Died: March 5, 1966 (aged 56); Lake Charles, Louisiana, U.S.

Coaching career (HC unless noted)
- 1943–1944: Randolph Field

Head coaching record
- Overall: 20–1–1 (college)
- Bowls: 1–0–1

Frank Michael Tritico (March 25, 1909 – March 5, 1966), sometimes listed as Frank Mitchell Tritico, was an American football coach. He was the head coach of the Randolph Field football team during World War II. His 1943 Randolph Field Ramblers football team compiled a 9–1–1 record, including a 7–7 tie with Texas in the 1944 Cotton Bowl Classic. The 1944 team compiled a perfect 11–0 record, outscored opponents by a total of 441 to 19, and was ranked No. 3 in the final AP poll. Football statistician and historian Dr. L. H. Baker selected Tritico's 1944 squad as national champions for 1944.

Prior to World War II, Tritico coached high school football for LaGrange High School in Lake Charles, Louisiana. He later owned the Tritico Mattress Factory in Lake Charles. He died of a heart attack in 1966 at Lake Charles.

== Head coaching record ==
=== College ===
Year	Team	Overall	Conference	Standing	Bowl/playoffs	AP^{#}
Randolph Field Ramblers (Independent) (1943–1944)
1943	Randolph Field	9–1–1			T Cotton	
1944	Randolph Field	11–0			W Treasury Bond Bowl	3
Randolph Field:		20–1–1				
Total:		20–1–1				
^{#}Rankings from final AP Poll.
