= 1944 Cotton Bowl Classic =

- 8th Cotton Bowl Classic
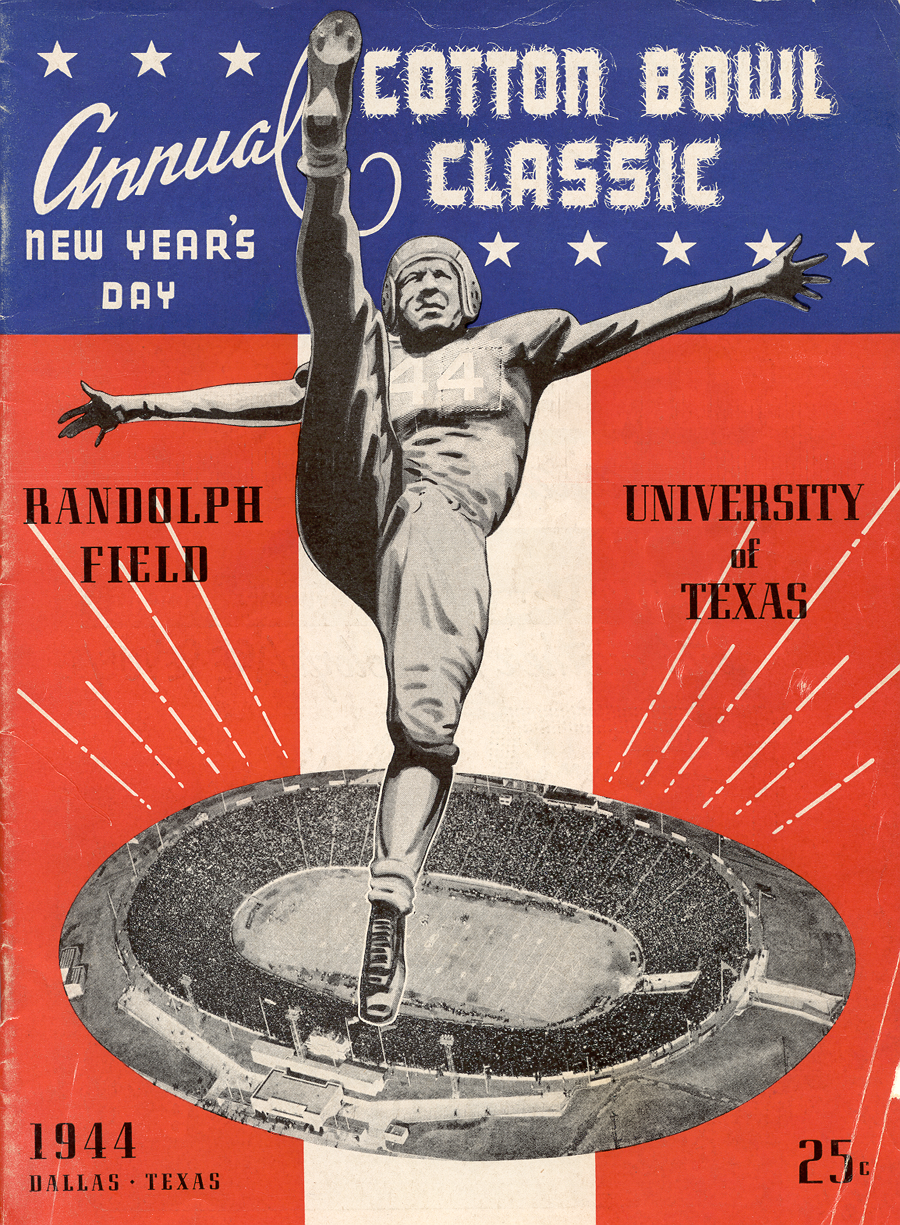
Randolph Field Ramblers	Texas Longhorns
(9–1)	(7–1)
Independent	SWC
7	7
Head coach: Frank Tritico	Head coach: Dana X. Bible
	AP 14
	1	2	3	4	Total
Randolph Field	7	0	0	0	7
Texas	0	7	0	0	7
- Date: January 1, 1944
- Season: 1943
- Stadium: Cotton Bowl
- Location: Dallas, Texas
- MVP: Martin Ruby, T, Randolph Field; Glenn Dobbs, QB, Randolph Field; Joe Parker, E, Texas
- Attendance: 15,000

The Cotton Bowl in Dallas, Texas, hosted the Cotton Bowl Classic.

The 1944 Cotton Bowl Classic was a postseason college football bowl game between the fourteenth ranked Texas Longhorns and the Randolph Field Ramblers, a military institution squad from San Antonio, TX.

== Background ==
Randolph boasted many former college football stars, most notably Tulsa's Glenn Dobbs, who had 1,867 all purpose yards for the year with 1,431 passing and 421 yards rushing. He was also their punter, with a 40.2 average per kick.

Martin Ruby became the first and only player to play on two different Cotton Bowl teams, having played in the 1942 Cotton Bowl Classic. He was named outstanding player in both games.

== Game summary ==
The game was played in a cold, steady rain described by Bible as the worst he had ever seen. Tex Aulds scored for Randolph on a touchdown catch from Glenn Dobbs. But Texas rallied back with a George McCall touchdown catch from Ralph Ellsworth to tie the game. The game stayed that way due to defense that allowed 260 yards combined from both teams.

== Statistics ==
Statistics	Texas	Randolph
First downs	3	7
Yards rushing	73	99
Yards passing	37	51
Total yards	110	150
Punts-Average	8-33.1	10-39.9
Fumbles lost	1	1
Penalties-Yards	0-0	4-20

== Attendance ==
32,000 tickets were sold for the game but only 15,000 spectators came to the game because of the weather.
