= 1943 Arkansas Razorbacks football team =

American college football season

1943 Arkansas Razorbacks football
- Conference: Southwest Conference
- Record: 2–7 (1–4 SWC)
- Head coach: John Tomlin (1st season)
- Captains: Lamar Dingler; Ben Jones
- Home stadium: Razorback Stadium

1943 Southwest Conference football standings
	Conf.					Overall
Team	W		L		T	W		L		T
No. 14 Texas $	5	–	0	–	0	7	–	1	–	1
Texas A&M	4	–	1	–	0	7	–	2	–	1
Rice	2	–	3	–	0	3	–	7	–	0
SMU	2	–	3	–	0	2	–	7	–	0
TCU	1	–	4	–	0	2	–	6	–	0
Arkansas	1	–	4	–	0	2	–	7	–	0
$ – Conference champion; Rankings from AP Poll

The 1943 Arkansas Razorbacks football team represented the University of Arkansas in the Southwest Conference (SWC) during the 1943 college football season. In their first and only year under head coach John Tomlin, the Razorbacks compiled a 2–7 record (1–4 against SWC opponents), finished in last place in the SWC, and were outscored by their opponents by a combined total of 192 to 105.

Receiver Ben Jones tied for fifth in the nation in receptions in 1943. Punter Harold Cox led the nation in yards per punt average, with 41.0.

In the final Litkenhous Ratings, Arkansas ranked 91st among the nation's college and service teams with a rating of 68.2.

== Schedule ==
Date	Opponent	Site	Result	Attendance	Source
September 25	Missouri Mines*	Razorback Stadium; Fayetteville, AR	W 59–0	3,000	
October 2	TCU	Quigley Stadium; Little Rock, AR	L 0–13	10,500	
October 9	Arkansas A&M*	Razorback Stadium; Fayetteville, AR	L 12–19		
October 16	at Texas	War Memorial Stadium; Austin, TX (rivalry)	L 0–34		
October 30	No. 19 Texas A&M^{†}	Razorback Stadium; Fayetteville, AR (rivalry)	L 0–7	4,500	
November 6	at Rice	Rice Field; Houston, TX	L 7–20		
November 13	vs. SMU	Alamo Stadium; San Antonio, TX	W 14–12	10,000	
November 19	vs. Oklahoma A&M*	Grizzly Stadium; Fort Smith, AR	L 13–19	10,000	
November 25	at No. 20 Tulsa*	Skelly Field; Tulsa, OK	L 0–61	15,000	
*Non-conference game; ^{†}Homecoming; Rankings from AP Poll released prior to the game
