= 1943 TCU Horned Frogs football team =

American college football season

1943 TCU Horned Frogs football
- Conference: Southwest Conference
- Record: 2–6 (1–4 SWC)
- Head coach: Dutch Meyer (10th season)
- Offensive scheme: Meyer spread
- Captain: Clyde Flowers
- Home stadium: Amon G. Carter Stadium

1943 Southwest Conference football standings
	Conf.					Overall
Team	W		L		T	W		L		T
No. 14 Texas $	5	–	0	–	0	7	–	1	–	1
Texas A&M	4	–	1	–	0	7	–	2	–	1
Rice	2	–	3	–	0	3	–	7	–	0
SMU	2	–	3	–	0	2	–	7	–	0
TCU	1	–	4	–	0	2	–	6	–	0
Arkansas	1	–	4	–	0	2	–	7	–	0
$ – Conference champion; Rankings from AP Poll

The 1943 TCU Horned Frogs football team represented Texas Christian University (TCU) in the 1943 college football season. The Horned Frogs finished the season 2–6 overall and 1–4 in the Southwest Conference. The team was coached by Dutch Meyer in his tenth year as head coach.

In the final Litkenhous Ratings, TCU ranked 93rd among the nation's college and service teams with a rating of 67.4.

The Frogs played their home games in Amon G. Carter Stadium, which is located on campus in Fort Worth, Texas.

== Schedule ==
Date	Opponent	Site	Result	Attendance	Source
October 2	at Arkansas	Quigley Stadium; Little Rock, AR	W 13–0	10,500	
October 16	No. 18 Texas A&M	Amon G. Carter Stadium; Fort Worth, TX (rivalry)	L 0–13	16,000	
October 23	vs. Oklahoma A&M*	Taft Stadium; Oklahoma City, OK	W 25–0	3,500	
October 30	at LSU*	Tiger Stadium; Baton Rouge, LA	L 0–14	18,000	
November 6	Texas Tech*	Amon G. Carter Stadium; Fort Worth, TX (rivalry)	L 20–40	3,000	
November 13	at No. 16 Texas	War Memorial Stadium; Austin, TX (rivalry)	L 7–46	12,000	
November 20	Rice	Amon G. Carter Stadium; Fort Worth, TX	L 6–13	3,000	
November 27	SMU	Amon G. Carter Stadium; Fort Worth, TX (rivalry)	L 0–20	4,000	
*Non-conference game; Rankings from AP Poll released prior to the game
