= 1943 Texas A&M Aggies football team =

American college football season

1943 Texas A&M Aggies football

Orange Bowl, L 14–19 vs. LSU
- Conference: Southwest Conference
- Record: 7–2–1 (4–1 SWC)
- Head coach: Homer Norton (10th season)
- Home stadium: Kyle Field

1943 Southwest Conference football standings
	Conf.					Overall
Team	W		L		T	W		L		T
No. 14 Texas $	5	–	0	–	0	7	–	1	–	1
Texas A&M	4	–	1	–	0	7	–	2	–	1
Rice	2	–	3	–	0	3	–	7	–	0
SMU	2	–	3	–	0	2	–	7	–	0
TCU	1	–	4	–	0	2	–	6	–	0
Arkansas	1	–	4	–	0	2	–	7	–	0
$ – Conference champion; Rankings from AP Poll

The 1943 Texas A&M Aggies football team represented the Agricultural and Mechanical College of Texas—now known as Texas A&M University—as a member of the Southwest Conference (SWC) during the 1943 college football season. Led by tenth-year head coach Homer Norton, the Aggies compiled an overall record of 7–2–1 with a mark of 4–1 in conference play, placing second in the SWC.

In the final Litkenhous Ratings, Texas A&M ranked 36th among the nation's college and service teams with a rating of 88.6.

== Schedule ==
Date	Time	Opponent	Rank	Site	Result	Attendance	Source
September 25	2:30 p.m.	Bryan AAF*		Kyle Field; College Station, TX	W 48–6		
October 2		vs. Texas Tech*		Alamo Stadium; San Antonio, TX (rivalry)	W 13–0	25,000	
October 9		at No. 17 LSU*		Tiger Stadium; Baton Rouge, LA (rivalry)	W 28–13	25,000	
October 16		at TCU	No. 18	Amon G. Carter Stadium; Fort Worth, TX (rivalry)	W 13–0	16,000	
October 23		North Texas Aggies*	No. 13	Kyle Field; College Station, TX	T 0–0		
October 30		at Arkansas	No. 19	Razorback Stadium; Fayetteville, AR (rivalry)	W 13–0	4,500	
November 6		SMU	No. 16	Kyle Field; College Station, TX	W 22–0	7,000	
November 13		at Rice	No. 14	Rice Field; Houston, TX	W 20–0	15,000	
November 25		No. 12 Texas	No. 16	Kyle Field; College Station, TX (rivalry)	L 13–27	32,000	
January 1		vs. No. 20 LSU*		Burdine Stadium; Miami, FL (Orange Bowl)	L 14–19	30,000	
*Non-conference game; Rankings from AP Poll released prior to the game; All times are in Central time

== Rankings ==
Ranking movements Legend: ██ Increase in ranking ██ Decrease in ranking — = Not ranked
	Week								
Poll	1	2	3	4	5	6	7	8	Final
AP	—	18	13	19	16	14	12	16	—
