= 1943 Oklahoma A&M Cowboys football team =

American college football season

1943 Oklahoma A&M Cowboys football
- Conference: Missouri Valley Conference
- Record: 3–4 (0–1 MVC)
- Head coach: Jim Lookabaugh (5th season)
- Home stadium: Lewis Field

1943 Missouri Valley Conference football standings
	Conf.					Overall
Team	W		L		T	W		L		T
No. 15 Tulsa $	1	–	0	–	0	6	–	1	–	1
Oklahoma A&M	0	–	1	–	0	3	–	4	–	0
$ – Conference champion; Rankings from AP Poll

The 1943 Oklahoma A&M Cowboys football team represented Oklahoma A&M College in the 1941 college football season. This was the 43rd year of football at A&M and the fifth under Jim Lookabaugh. The Cowboys played their home games at Lewis Field in Stillwater, Oklahoma. They finished the season 3–4, and 0–1 in the Missouri Valley Conference.

In the final Litkenhous Ratings, Oklahoma A&M ranked 117th among the nation's college and service teams with a rating of 60.9.

== Schedule ==
Date	Time	Opponent	Site	Result	Attendance	Source
September 24	8:15 p.m.	vs. Texas Tech*	Taft Stadium; Oklahoma City OK	W 21–13	7,000	
October 2		vs. Oklahoma*	Taft Stadium; Oklahoma City, OK (Bedlam Series)	L 13–22	12,000	
October 16		Norman NAS*	Lewis Field; Stillwater, OK	L 0–20		
October 23		vs. TCU*	Taft Stadium; Oklahoma City, OK	L 0–25	3,500	
November 6		at No. 19 Tulsa	Skelly Field; Tulsa, OK (rivalry)	L 6–55	9,000	
November 19		vs. Arkansas*	Grizzly Stadium; Fort Smith, AR	W 19–13	10,000	
November 25		at Denver*	Hilltop Stadium; Denver, CO	W 7–6		
*Non-conference game; Rankings from AP Poll released prior to the game; All times are in Central time
