= 1943 LSU Tigers football team =

American college football season

1943 LSU Tigers football

Orange Bowl champion

Orange Bowl, W 19–14 vs. Texas A&M
- Conference: Southeastern Conference
- Record: 6–3 (2–2 SEC)
- Head coach: Bernie Moore (9th season)
- Home stadium: Tiger Stadium

1943 Southeastern Conference football standings
	Conf.					Overall
Team		W		L			W		L
No. 13 Georgia Tech $	3	–	0	–	0	8	–	3	–	0
LSU	2	–	2	–	0	6	–	3	–	0
Tulane	1	–	1	–	0	3	–	3	–	0
Georgia	0	–	3	–	0	6	–	4	–	0
Vanderbilt	0	–	0	–	0	5	–	0	–	0
$ – Conference champion; Seven other SEC schools did not field a team due to World War II.; Rankings from AP Poll

The 1943 LSU Tigers football team was an American football team that represented Louisiana State University (LSU) as a member of the Southeastern Conference (SEC) during the 1943 college football season. In their ninth year under head coach Bernie Moore, the Tigers compiled an overall record of 6–3, with a conference record of 2–2, and finished second in the SEC.

LSU did not celebrate a homecoming game in 1943 due to World War II. Halfback Steve Van Buren led the nation in rushing with an average of 5.7 yards per carry and was second in scoring.

In the final Litkenhous Ratings, LSU ranked 54th among the nation's college and service teams with a rating of 82.0.

== Schedule ==
Date	Opponent	Rank	Site	Result	Attendance	Source
September 25	Georgia		Tiger Stadium; Baton Rouge, LA	W 34–27	20,000	
October 2	Rice*		Tiger Stadium; Baton Rouge, LA	W 20–7	22,000	
October 9	Texas A&M*	No. 17	Tiger Stadium; Baton Rouge, LA (rivalry)	L 13–28	25,000	
October 16	Louisiana Army*		Tiger Stadium; Baton Rouge, LA	W 28–7	3,500	
October 23	at Georgia		Memorial Stadium; Columbus, GA	W 27–6	13,000	
October 30	TCU*		Tiger Stadium; Baton Rouge, LA	W 14–0	18,000	
November 6	at Georgia Tech	No. 20	Grant Field; Atlanta, GA	L 7–42	20,000	
November 20	at Tulane		Tulane Stadium; New Orleans, LA (Battle for the Rag)	L 0–27	40,000	
January 1, 1944	vs. Texas A&M		Burdine Stadium; Miami, FL (Orange Bowl / rivalry)	W 19–14	30,000	
*Non-conference game; Rankings from AP Poll released prior to the game

== Rankings ==
Ranking movements Legend: ██ Increase in ranking ██ Decrease in ranking — = Not ranked
	Week								
Poll	1	2	3	4	5	6	7	8	Final
AP	17	—	—	—	20	—	—	—	—
