= 1943 SMU Mustangs football team =

American college football season

1943 SMU Mustangs football
- Conference: Southwest Conference
- Record: 2–7 (2–3 SWC)
- Head coach: Jimmy Stewart (2nd season)
- Captains: Abel Gonzalez; Ray Rasor
- Home stadium: Ownby Stadium

1943 Southwest Conference football standings
	Conf.					Overall
Team	W		L		T	W		L		T
No. 14 Texas $	5	–	0	–	0	7	–	1	–	1
Texas A&M	4	–	1	–	0	7	–	2	–	1
Rice	2	–	3	–	0	3	–	7	–	0
SMU	2	–	3	–	0	2	–	7	–	0
TCU	1	–	4	–	0	2	–	6	–	0
Arkansas	1	–	4	–	0	2	–	7	–	0
$ – Conference champion; Rankings from AP Poll

The 1943 SMU Mustangs football team was an American football team that represented Southern Methodist University (SMU) as a member of the Southwest Conference (SWC) during the 1943 college football season. In their second season under head coach Jimmy Stewart, the Mustangs compiled a 2–7 record (2–3 against conference opponents) and were outscored by a total of 115 to 69.

In the final Litkenhous Ratings, SMU ranked 71st among the nation's college and service teams with a rating of 75.1.

The team played its home games at Ownby Stadium in the University Park suburb of Dallas.

== Schedule ==
Date	Time	Opponent	Site	Result	Attendance	Source
September 25		Tulsa*	Ownby Stadium; University Park, TX	L 7–20	12,000	
October 2	3:00 p.m.	North Texas Aggies*	Ownby Stadium; University Park, TX	L 6–20	4,000	
October 9		No. 13 Memphis NATTC*	Ownby Stadium; University Park, TX	Cancelled		
October 16		Rice	Ownby Stadium; University Park, TX	W 12–0	4,000	
October 23		at Tulane*	Tulane Stadium; New Orleans, LA	L 6–12	22,000	
October 30		No. 12 Texas	Ownby Stadium; University Park, TX	L 0–20		
November 6		at No. 16 Texas A&M	Kyle Field; College Station, TX	L 0–22	7,000	
November 13		vs. Arkansas	Alamo Stadium; San Antonio, TX	L 12–14	10,000	
November 20		Texas Tech*	Ownby Stadium; University Park, TX	L 6–7	3,000	
November 27		at TCU	Amon G. Carter Stadium; Fort Worth, TX (rivalry)	W 20–0	4,000	
*Non-conference game; Rankings from AP Poll released prior to the game; All times are in Central time
