= Claude Simons Jr. =

American football player, athletics coach and college athletics administrator

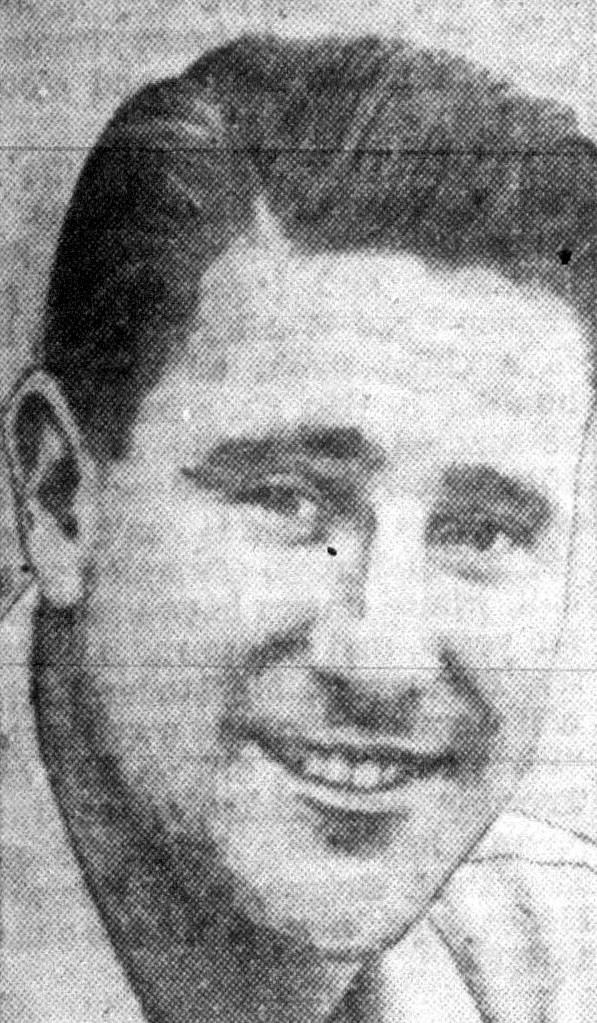
- Simons, circa 1942

Biographical details
- Born: January 16, 1914; New Orleans, Louisiana, U.S.
- Died: January 6, 1975 (aged 60); Washington, D.C., U.S.

Playing career

Football
- 1932–1934: Tulane
- Position: Halfback

Coaching career (HC unless noted)

Football
- 1935–1937: Transylvania
- 1942–1945: Tulane

Basketball
- 1938–1942: Tulane

Baseball
- 1938–1941: Tulane
- 1943–1949: Tulane

Administrative career (AD unless noted)
- 1946–1947: Tulane

Head coaching record
- Overall: 24–29–2 (football); 19–44 (basketball); 91–69 (baseball)

Accomplishments and honors

Championships
- Baseball; 1 SEC (1948)

Awards
- Third-team All-American (1934); First-team All-SEC (1934)
- College Football Hall of Fame; Inducted in 1963 (profile)

Claude M. "Little Monk" Simons Jr. (January 16, 1914 – January 6, 1975) was an American football player, coach of football, basketball, and baseball, and college athletics administrator. He played college football at Tulane University, where he starred for the Tulane Green Wave as a halfback. Simons served as the head football coach at Transylvania University from 1935 to 1937 and his alma mater, Tulane, from 1942 to 1945, compiling career college football coaching record of 24–29–2. He was the basketball coach at Tulane from 1938 to 1942, tallying a mark of 19–44. He also had two stints the school's baseball coach, from 1938 to 1941 and 1943 to 1949, amassing a record of 91–69. Simons was the athletic director at Tulane from 1946 to 1947. He was inducted into the College Football Hall of Fame as player in 1963.

== Early life ==
Simons was born on January 16, 1914, in New Orleans and later attended the Isidore Newman School. Simons' father, Claude "Monk" Simons Sr., served as the head coach for the Tulane baseball, basketball, track, and boxing teams, and as the Tulane football team trainer from 1926 until his death in 1943.

Simons attended Tulane University, where he played football as the team's "star kicking and passing halfback," and earned varsity letters from 1932 to 1934. During the 1934 season, Simons scored a touchdown in the final three minutes to defeat rival LSU by a single point, causing his mother to faint. Simons helped lead Tulane to a comeback win over Pop Warner's Temple in the inaugural Sugar Bowl, 20–14. Simons scored touchdowns on 75- and 83-yard rushes. Tulane finished with a 10–1 record, and won a share of the Southeastern Conference co-championship. The Associated Press selected Simons to its All-America third team. For the season, Simons led the team in rushing, passing, and scoring.

== Coaching career ==
Simons served as the head basketball coach for Tulane from 1938 to 1942, during which period his teams amassed a 19–44 record.

In 1938, he was also an assistant coach on the Tulane football team. Simons took over as head coach for the 1942 season, during World War II when many college age men were leaving for military service. Tulane finished with a 4–5 record, which was the school's first losing season since 1927. After posting a 3–3 record in 1943, Simons achieved his only winning season the following year, with a 4–3 mark. In 1945, after a 2–2–1 start, Tulane suffered a four-game skid to finish 2–6–1. Simons was replaced as head football coach by Henry Frnka for the 1946 season, but continued on as the university's athletic director.

Simons also served as the Tulane baseball coach from 1938 to 1941 and 1943 to 1949, during which his teams amassed a 92–68 record. Under Simons, the baseball team captured the 1948 Southeastern Conference championship.

== Administrative career ==
In 1956, Simons was elected to a position with the New Orleans Mid-Winter Sports Association, which sponsored the Sugar Bowl, and served as the chairman of the Sugar Bowl basketball tournament committee, a position in which he continued to serve until at least 1966. In 1958 and 1959, Simons was serving as the Association's president. He was still working with the Sugar Bowl in 1972.

== Honors ==
Simons was inducted into the College Football Hall of Fame in 1963, the Greater New Orleans Sports Hall of Fame in 1974, and the Tulane Athletics Hall of Fame in 1977.

== Head coaching record ==
=== Football ===
| Year | Team | Overall | Conference | Standing | Bowl/playoffs |
|---|---|---|---|---|---|
Transylvania Pioneers (Southern Intercollegiate Athletic Association) (1935–1937)
| 1935 | Transylvania | 5–3 | 3–1 | T–11th | |
| 1936 | Transylvania | 3–4–1 | 1–3–1 | 23rd | |
| 1937 | Transylvania | 3–5 | 2–4 | T–21st | |
| Transylvania: | | 11–12–1 | 6–8–1 | | |
Tulane Green Wave (Southeastern Conference) (1942–1945)
| 1942 | Tulane | 4–5 | 1–4 | 10th | |
| 1943 | Tulane | 3–3 | 1–1 | T–2nd | |
| 1944 | Tulane | 4–3 | 1–2 | 8th | |
| 1945 | Tulane | 2–6–1 | 1–3–1 | T–10th | |
| Tulane: | | 13–17–1 | 4–10–1 | | |
| Total: | | 24–29–2 | | | |
