= Claude Simons Sr. =

American sports coach

- Simons (right) aids a player as Tulane trainer

Biographical details
- Born: November 1886
- Died: November 4, 1943

Coaching career (HC unless noted)

Football
- 1923–1946: Tulane (trainer)

Basketball
- 1921–1928: Tulane
- 1930–1931: Tulane

Baseball
- 1924–1927: Tulane

Track and field
- 1920–1923: Tulane

Head coaching record
- Overall: 97–73 (basketball); 18–26 (baseball)

Claude M. "Monk" Simons Sr. (November 1886 – November 4, 1943) was an American college sports coach. He served as the head coach for the Tulane University baseball, basketball, track, and boxing teams, and as the Tulane football team trainer from 1926 until his death in 1943. Simons was the head basketball coach from 1920 to 1928, and again for the 1930–31 season.

He served as the track and field head coach from 1920 to 1923. Simons led the Tulane basketball team to its best record in school history, 22–1 during the 1923–1924 season. He also was the president of the Southern Amateur Athletic Union. Simons was inducted into the Southeast Athletic Trainers' Association Hall of Fame in 1962. He was inducted into the Tulane Athletics Hall of Fame in 1978.

Simons' son, Claude Simons Jr., served as the Tulane football coach from 1942 to 1945.
