= 1943 Vanderbilt Commodores football team =

American college football season

1943 Vanderbilt Commodores football
- Conference: Southeastern Conference
- Record: 5–0 (0–0 SEC)
- Head coach: Ernest Alley (1st season)
- Captains: James Hamilton; Bob Hamilton
- Home stadium: Dudley Field

1943 Southeastern Conference football standings
	Conf.					Overall
Team		W		L			W		L
No. 13 Georgia Tech $	3	–	0	–	0	8	–	3	–	0
LSU	2	–	2	–	0	6	–	3	–	0
Tulane	1	–	1	–	0	3	–	3	–	0
Georgia	0	–	3	–	0	6	–	4	–	0
Vanderbilt	0	–	0	–	0	5	–	0	–	0
$ – Conference champion; Seven other SEC schools did not field a team due to World War II.; Rankings from AP Poll

The 1943 Vanderbilt Commodores football team was an American football team that represented Vanderbilt University as a member of the Southeastern Conference (SEC) during the 1943 college football season. In their first year under head coach Ernest Alley, the Commodores compiled an overall record of 5–0, with a conference record of 0–0, and finished fifth in the SEC.

In the final Litkenhous Ratings, Vanderbilt ranked 125th among the nation's college and service teams with a rating of 58.9.

== Schedule ==
Date	Opponent	Site	Result	Attendance	Source
October 16	at Tennessee Tech*	Cookeville, TN	W 20–0		
October 23	Camp Campbell*	Dudley Field; Nashville, TN	W 40–14	6,000	
October 30	Milligan*	Dudley Field; Nashville, TN	W 26–6	3,000	
November 6	Carson–Newman*	Dudley Field; Nashville, TN	W 12–6		
November 25	Tennessee Tech*	Dudley Field; Nashville, TN	W 47–7	7,000	
*Non-conference game
