= Mitchell Olenski =

American football player and coach (1920–2000)

No. 60, 48, 82
- Position: Tackle

Personal information
- Born: January 13, 1920; Benton, Illinois, U.S.
- Died: June 13, 2000 (aged 80); Vestal, New York, U.S.
- Listed height: 6 ft 2 in (1.88 m)
- Listed weight: 235 lb (107 kg)

Career information
- High school: Union-Endicott (Endicott, New York)
- College: Alabama
- NFL draft: 1944: 9th round, 78th overall pick

Career history
- Miami Seahawks (1946); Baltimore Colts (1947)*; Detroit Lions (1947)
- * Offseason or practice squad member only

Career NFL/AAFC statistics
- Games played: 26
- Games started: 18
- Stats at Pro Football Reference

Mitchell Olenski (January 13, 1920 – June 13, 2000) was an American football player and coach. Olenski played college football for the Alabama Crimson Tide, while serving in the Army at Fort Warren and then professionally with the Miami Seahawks and Detroit Lions. He also served as a coach for the Alabama Informals football team in their lone 1943 season and at Fort Warren in 1944 and 1945.

== University of Alabama ==
Olenski played his first season with the Crimson Tide as a member of their freshmen team for the 1940 season. He then started at tackle for Alabama in both the 1941 and 1942 seasons.

After the university canceled the 1943 season, Olenski served as a coach for the Alabama Informals. The squad was composed of 17-year-old and draft deferred students and after a loss to Howard, the Informals defeated Marion Military Institute twice and finished the season with an overall record of two wins and one loss.

== Professional career ==
Olenski was taken in the ninth round as the 78th overall pick in the 1944 NFL draft by the Brooklyn Tigers. He never played a game with the Tigers, and instead enlisted in United States Army. Olenski was stationed at Fort Warren in Cheyenne, Wyoming, where he also played defensive tackle and served as an assistant coach for the base team, the Fort Warren Broncos. For his performance on the field in 1944, Olenski was named to the 1944 All-Rocky Mountain Team.

On September 9, 1945, he was signed by the Miami Seahawks of the All-America Football Conference for their 1946 season for whom he would play after he finished the 1945 season at Fort Warren. With the Seahawks, Olenski played for one of his former coaches at Alabama, Hank Crisp, and was a starter at the tackle position for the duration of the season. After his first season in Miami, Olenski was signed by the Baltimore Colts in July 1947, but was subsequently cut on August 26. He was then signed by the Detroit Lions where he played tackle for their 1947 season.
