= 1943 Rice Owls football team =

American college football season

1943 Rice Owls football
- Conference: Southwest Conference
- Record: 3–7 (2–3 SWC)
- Head coach: Jess Neely (4th season)
- Home stadium: Rice Field

1943 Southwest Conference football standings
	Conf.					Overall
Team	W		L		T	W		L		T
No. 14 Texas $	5	–	0	–	0	7	–	1	–	1
Texas A&M	4	–	1	–	0	7	–	2	–	1
Rice	2	–	3	–	0	3	–	7	–	0
SMU	2	–	3	–	0	2	–	7	–	0
TCU	1	–	4	–	0	2	–	6	–	0
Arkansas	1	–	4	–	0	2	–	7	–	0
$ – Conference champion; Rankings from AP Poll

The 1943 Rice Owls football team was an American football team that represented Rice Institute as a member of the Southwest Conference (SWC) during the 1943 college football season. In its fourth season under head coach Jess Neely, the team compiled a 3–7 record (2–3 against SWC opponents) and was outscored by a total of 183 to 60.

In the final Litkenhous Ratings, Rice ranked 90th among the nation's college and service teams with a rating of 68.6.

== Schedule ==
Date	Opponent	Site	Result	Attendance	Source
September 25	Randolph Field*	Rice Field; Houston, TX	L 0–6	12,000	
October 2	at LSU*	Tiger Stadium; Baton Rouge, LA	L 7–20	22,000	
October 9	Tulane*	Rice Field; Houston, TX	L 0–33		
October 16	at SMU	Ownby Stadium; University Park, TX (rivalry)	L 0–12	4,000	
October 23	at No. 16 Texas	War Memorial Stadium; Austin, TX (rivalry)	L 0–58		
October 30	Texas Tech*	Rice Field; Houston, TX	W 13–0	5,000	
November 6	Arkansas	Rice Field; Houston, TX	W 20–7		
November 13	No. 14 Texas A&M	Rice Field; Houston, TX	L 0–20	15,000	
November 20	at TCU	Amon G. Carter Stadium; Fort Worth, TX	W 13–6	3,000	
November 27	Southwestern (TX)*	Rice Field; Houston, TX	L 7–21	4,000	
*Non-conference game; Rankings from AP Poll released prior to the game
