= 1944 Orange Bowl =

American college football game

- 10th Orange Bowl
- Burdine Stadium in Miami, Florida, hosted the Orange Bowl.
LSU Tigers	Texas A&M Aggies
(5–3)	(7–1–1)
SEC	SWC
19	14
Head coach: Bernie Moore	Head coach: Homer H. Norton
	1	2	3	4	Total
LSU	12	0	7	0	19
Texas A&M	7	0	7	0	14
- Date: January 1, 1944
- Season: 1943
- Stadium: Burdine Stadium
- Location: Miami, Florida
- Referee: Ray McCullouch (SWC; split crew: SWC, SEC)
- Attendance: 69,000

The 1944 Orange Bowl was college football bowl game between the LSU Tigers and Texas A&M Aggies. It was the 10th edition of the Orange Bowl. The teams had played during the regular season, with Texas A&M winning at LSU, 28–13. This was the first known instance of a bowl game serving as a rematch between teams that had met during the regular season.

LSU defeated Texas A&M in the bowl rematch, 19–14. Despite A&M coach Homer Norton devising a game-plan specifically to stop him, halfback Steve Van Buren was responsible for all points scored by the Tigers, as he ran for two touchdowns, threw for one more, and kicked LSU's only successful extra point attempt.

== Scoring summary ==
- LSU - Van Buren 11-yard run reverse (kick failed)
- LSU - Goode 24-yard pass from Van Buren (kick failed)
- Texas A&M - Burditt 21-yard pass from Hallmark (Burditt kick)
- LSU - Van Buren 63-yard run (Van Buren kick)
- Texas A&M - Settegast 18-yard pass from Hallmark (Burditt kick)

== Statistics ==
Statistics	LSU	Texas A&M
First downs	7	9
Rushing attempts	48	24
Rushing yards	207	4
Passing yards	92	171
Total offense	299	175
Interceptions	0	5
Punts–average	10–40.3	9–41.8
Fumbles–lost	3–3	5–2
Penalties–yards	7–81	4–35

== See also ==
- LSU–Texas A&M football rivalry
- List of college football post-season games that were rematches of regular season games
