= 1943 Georgia Bulldogs football team =

American college football season

1943 Georgia Bulldogs football
- Conference: Southeastern Conference
- Record: 6–4 (0–3 SEC)
- Head coach: Wally Butts (5th season)
- Home stadium: Sanford Stadium

1943 Southeastern Conference football standings
	Conf.					Overall
Team		W		L			W		L
No. 13 Georgia Tech $	3	–	0	–	0	8	–	3	–	0
LSU	2	–	2	–	0	6	–	3	–	0
Tulane	1	–	1	–	0	3	–	3	–	0
Georgia	0	–	3	–	0	6	–	4	–	0
Vanderbilt	0	–	0	–	0	5	–	0	–	0
$ – Conference champion; Seven other SEC schools did not field a team due to World War II.; Rankings from AP Poll

The 1943 Georgia Bulldogs football team was an American football team that represented the University of Georgia as a member of the Southeastern Conference (SEC) during the 1943 college football season. In their fifth year under head coach Wally Butts, the Bulldogs compiled an overall record of 6–4, with a conference record of 0–3, and finished fourth in the SEC.

In the final Litkenhous Ratings, Georgia ranked 72nd among the nation's college and service teams with a rating of 74.9.

== Schedule ==
Date	Opponent	Rank	Site	Result	Attendance	Source
September 17	Presbyterian*		Sanford Stadium; Athens, GA	W 25–7	6,000	
September 25	at LSU		Tiger Stadium; Baton Rouge, LA	L 27–32	20,000	
October 1	Tennessee Tech*		Sanford Stadium; Athens, GA	W 67–0		
October 8	Wake Forest*		Sanford Stadium; Athens, GA	W 7–0	7,500	
October 16	at Daniel Field*	No. 20	Richmond Academy Stadium; Augusta, GA	L 7–18	5,000	
October 23	vs. LSU		Memorial Stadium; Columbus, GA	L 6–27	13,000	
October 29	Howard (AL)*		Sanford Stadium; Athens, GA	W 39–0	4,500	
November 5	Presbyterian*^{†}		Sanford Stadium; Athens, GA	W 40-12	4,000	
November 13	vs. VMI		Grant Field; Atlanta, GA	W 46–7	5,000	
November 27	at No. 14 Georgia Tech		Grant Field; Atlanta, GA (rivalry)	L 0–48	28,000	
*Non-conference game; ^{†}Homecoming; Rankings from AP Poll released prior to the game

== Rankings ==
Ranking movements Legend: ██ Increase in ranking ██ Decrease in ranking — = Not ranked
	Week								
Poll	1	2	3	4	5	6	7	8	Final
AP	—	20	—	—	—	—	—	—	—
