= Ernest Alley =

American football player, track athlete, and coach (1904–1971)

Biographical details
- Born: June 4, 1904; Tracy City, Tennessee, U.S.
- Died: August 24, 1971 (aged 67); Nashville, Tennessee, U.S.

Playing career

Football
- 1926: Tennessee Wesleyan
- 1927–1928: Tennessee
- Position: End

Coaching career (HC unless noted)

Football
- 1929: Tennessee (assistant)
- 1930: Itta Bena HS (MS)
- c. 1932: Philadelphia HS (MS)
- 1933–1936: Canton HS (MS)
- 1937–1938: Greenville HS (MS)
- 1939: Middle Tennessee State Teachers
- 1940: Vanderbilt (ends)
- 1943: Vanderbilt
- 1944–1945: Auburn (assistant)

Baseball
- 1940: Middle Tennessee State Teachers

Track
- 1949–1971: Vanderbilt

Head coaching record
- Overall: 6–6–1 (college football); 77–17–6 (high school football)

Ernest Hayes "Herc" Alley (June 4, 1904 – August 24, 1971) was an American college football player, track athlete, and coach. He served as head men's track coach at Vanderbilt University from 1949 to 1971. Alley was also the head football coach at Middle Tennessee State Teachers College—now known as Middle Tennessee State University—in 1939 and at Vanderbilt in 1943, compiling a career college football head coaching record of 6–6–1.

A native of Tracy City, Tennessee, Alley attended the Baylor School in Chattanooga, Tennessee. After graduating from Baylor, he went to Tennessee Wesleyan College—now known as Tennessee Wesleyan University—when it operated as a junior college. He captained the football team at Tennessee Wesleyan before moving on to the University of Tennessee, where he played football as an end from 1927 to 1928. Alley remained at Tennessee in the fall of 1929 as an assistant coach before being hired as the head coach at Itta Bena High school in Itta Bena, Mississippi. He also coached in Philadelphia, Mississippi before a four-year stint coaching at Canton High School in Canton, Mississippi. In 1937, he was appointed head football coach at Greenville High School in Greenville, Mississippi. In nine years of coaching high school football in Mississippi, Alley led his teams to a combined record of 77–17–6. He also earned a master's degree in physical education from Louisiana State University (LSU) before succeeding Johnny Floyd as coach at Middle Tennessee State Teachers in 1939. He returned to Vanderbilt as the track coach, a position he held from 1949 to 1971.

Alley died of cancer, on August 24, 1971, at his home in Nashville, Tennessee.

== Head coaching record ==
=== College football ===
Year	Team	Overall	Conference	Standing	Bowl/playoffs
Middle Tennessee State Teachers Blue Raiders (Southern Intercollegiate Athletic Association) (1939)
1939	Middle Tennessee State Teachers	1–6–1	1–5–1	T–26th	
Middle Tennessee State Teachers:		1–6–1	1–5–1		
Vanderbilt Commodores (Southeastern Conference) (1943)
1943	Vanderbilt	5–0	0–0		
Vanderbilt:		5–0	0–0		
Total:		6–6–1			
