= 1943 Tulane Green Wave football team =

American college football season

1943 Tulane Green Wave football
- Conference: Southeastern Conference
- Record: 3–3 (1–1 SEC)
- Head coach: Claude Simons Jr. (2nd season)
- Captain: Game captains
- Home stadium: Tulane Stadium

1943 Southeastern Conference football standings
	Conf.					Overall
Team		W		L			W		L
No. 13 Georgia Tech $	3	–	0	–	0	8	–	3	–	0
LSU	2	–	2	–	0	6	–	3	–	0
Tulane	1	–	1	–	0	3	–	3	–	0
Georgia	0	–	3	–	0	6	–	4	–	0
Vanderbilt	0	–	0	–	0	5	–	0	–	0
$ – Conference champion; Seven other SEC schools did not field a team due to World War II.; Rankings from AP Poll

The 1943 Tulane Green Wave football team was an American football team that represented Tulane University as a member of the Southeastern Conference (SEC) during the 1943 college football season. In its second year under head coach Claude Simons Jr., Tulane compiled a 3–3 record (1–1 in conference games), tied for second place in the SEC, and was outscored by a total of 94 to 92. Tulane ranked 37th in the final Litkenhous Ratings.

The Green Wave played its home games at Tulane Stadium in New Orleans.

== Schedule ==
Date	Opponent	Site	Result	Attendance	Source
October 2	Memphis NATTC*	Tulane Stadium; New Orleans, LA	L 7–41	25,000	
October 9	at Rice*	Rice Field; Houston, TX	W 33–0		
October 23	SMU*	Tulane Stadium; New Orleans, LA	W 12–6	22,000	
October 30	Georgia Pre-Flight*	Tulane Stadium; New Orleans, LA	L 13–14	18,000	
November 13	No. 19 Georgia Tech	Tulane Stadium; New Orleans, LA	L 0–33	38,000	
November 20	LSU	Tulane Stadium; New Orleans, LA (Battle for the Rag)	W 27–0	40,000	
*Non-conference game; Rankings from AP Poll released prior to the game
