= Henry Frnka =

American football player, coach, and college athletics administrator

Biographical details
- Born: March 16, 1903; Garwood, Texas, U.S.
- Died: December 18, 1980 (aged 77); San Antonio, Texas, U.S.

Playing career
- 1922–1925: Austin
- Position: Halfback

Coaching career (HC unless noted)
- 1926–1930: Lubbock HS (TX)
- 1931–1935: Greenville HS (TX)
- 1936–1939: Vanderbilt (assistant)
- 1940: Temple (assistant)
- 1941–1945: Tulsa
- 1946–1951: Tulane

Administrative career (AD unless noted)
- 1941–1945: Tulsa

Head coaching record
- Overall: 71–32–5 (college); 103–8–7 (high school)
- Bowls: 2–3

Accomplishments and honors

Championships
- 3 MVC (1941–1943); 1 SEC (1949)

Henry E. Frnka (/ˈfræŋkə/ FRANK-ə; March 16, 1903 – December 18, 1980) was an American football player, coach, and college athletics administrator. He served as the head coach at the University of Tulsa from 1941 to 1945 and at Tulane University from 1946 to 1951, compiling a career college football record of 71–32–5. Frnka was also the athletic director at Tulsa from 1941 to 1945.

== Coaching career ==
=== High school ===
Frnka began his coaching career at the high school level. He served as the head football coach at Lubbock High School in Lubbock, Texas, from 1926 to 1930 before moving to Greenville High School in Greenville, Texas, in 1931. He led the Greenville Lions to a Texas state championship in 1933. He used the fumblerooski for the very first time in the 1933 Texas High School Championship game.

=== Vanderbilt ===
Frank left Greenville in 1936 to become freshman coach at Vanderbilt University. He was briefly succeeded at Greenville by his assistant, Dennis Vinzant.

=== Tulsa ===
From 1941 to 1945, Frnka coached at the University of Tulsa, and compiled a 40–9–1 record. The Tulsa Golden Hurricane had never been to a bowl game before, and he took them to five straight, becoming Tulsa's most prolific coach. The Golden Hurricane won three league titles, and outscored opponents 1,552 to 375. He led the team to their first bowl game and a school-best national ranking of No. 4 at the end of the 1942 season.

=== Tulane ===
From 1946 to 1951, Frnka coached at Tulane University, and compiled a 31–23–4 record. Since the 1920s, the Tulane Green Wave had been a national power in college football, and Frnka-led teams produced records of 9–1 in 1948, 7–2–1 in 1949, and 6–2–1 in 1950. In a 1949 issue devoted to a preview of that year's college football season, SPORT magazine declared that Tulane was the best team in the country.

== Death ==
Frnka died on December 18, 1980, in San Antonio, Texas, at the age of 77.

== Head coaching record ==
=== College ===
Year	Team	Overall	Conference	Standing	Bowl/playoffs	AP^{#}
Tulsa Golden Hurricane (Missouri Valley Conference) (1941–1945)
1941	Tulsa	8–2	4–0	1st	W Sun	
1942	Tulsa	10–1	5–0	1st	L Sugar	4
1943	Tulsa	6–1–1	1–0	1st	L Sugar	15
1944	Tulsa	8–2	0–1	2nd	W Orange	
1945	Tulsa	8–3	2–1	2nd	L Oil	17
Tulsa:		40–9–1	12–2			
Tulane Green Wave (Southeastern Conference) (1946–1951)
1946	Tulane	3–7	2–4	9th		
1947	Tulane	2–5–2	2–3–2	7th		
1948	Tulane	9–1	5–1	3rd		13
1949	Tulane	7–2–1	5–1	1st		
1950	Tulane	6–2–1	3–1–1	4th		20
1951	Tulane	4–6	1–5	11th		
Tulane:		31–23–4	18–15–3			
Total:		71–32–5				
National championship Conference title Conference division title or championship game berth
^{#}Rankings from final AP Poll.
