= Dennis Vinzant =

American sports coach (1906–1976)

Biographical details
- Born: August 23, 1906
- Died: June 22, 1976 (aged 69); Wichita Falls, Texas, U.S.

Playing career

Football
- 1926: Texas Tech
- 1928–1929: Texas Tech

Basketball
- 1925–1927: Texas Tech
- 1928–1930: Texas Tech
- Position: End

Coaching career (HC unless noted)

Football
- 1931–1935: Greenville HS (TX) (assistant)
- 1936–1941: East Texas State (line)
- 1942: East Texas State
- 1946–1954: Tulane (assistant)
- 1955–?: Midwestern (TX) (line)

Basketball
- 1936–1946: East Texas State
- 1956–1970: Midwestern (TX)

Baseball
- 1952–1954: Tulane

Head coaching record
- Overall: 4–3–1 (football); 351–214 (basketball); 37–22–1 (baseball)

Accomplishments and honors

Championships
- Football; 1 LSC (1942) Basketball; 3 LSC regular season (1939–1940, 1942)

Dennis Ivan Vinzant (August 23, 1906 – June 22, 1976) was an American football, basketball, and baseball coach. He served as the head basketball coach at East Texas State Teachers College—now known a East Texas A&M University—from 1936 to 1946 and Midwestern University—now known as Midwestern State University—in Wichita Falls, Texas from 1956 to 1970, compiling a career college basketball coaching record of 351–214. Vinzant was also the head football coach at East Texas State in 1942, tallying a mark of 4–3–1, and the head baseball coach at Tulane University from 1952 to 1954, amassing a record of 37–22–1.

Vinzant attended North Side High School in Fort Worth, Texas, where he played football. He then moved on to Texas Tech University, where he played football as an end. He also lettered in basketball and track before graduating in 1931. He earned a master's degree from East Texas State in 1937.

Vinzant began his coaching career as an assistant coach at Greenville High School in Greenville, Texas, under Henry Frnka. He was appointed head coach at Greenville in 1936 when Frnka left to take a job as freshman coach at Vanderbilt University. But Vinzant then left for East Texas State to become head basketball coach and line coach for the football team, succeeding, S. J. "Red" Perry Jr., who had died of a cerebral hemorrhage.

In 1946, Vinzant reunited with Frnka, who had been hired as the head football coach at Tulane, when he was he was appointed as chief assistant to Frnka.

Vinzant died of cancer, on June 22, 1976, at a hospital in Wichita Falls.

== Head coaching record ==
=== Football ===
Year	Team	Overall	Conference	Standing	Bowl/playoffs
East Texas State Lions (Lone Star Conference) (1942)
1942	East Texas State	4–3–1	2–0–1	1st	
East Texas State:		4–3–1	2–0–1		
Total:		4–3–1			
National championship Conference title Conference division title or championship game berth

=== Basketball ===
Record table
Season	Team	Overall	Conference	Standing	Postseason
East Texas State Lions (Lone Star Conference) (1938–1945)
1937–38	East Texas State	15–9	4–4	3rd	
1938–39	East Texas State	16–7	7–1	T–1st	NAIA Second Round
1939–40	East Texas State	23–7	7–1	1st	NAIA Second Round
1940–41	East Texas State	11–12	4–4	3rd	
1941–42	East Texas State	12–6	6–2	T–1st	NAIA First Round
1942–43	East Texas State	5–10	2–4	3rd	
1943–44	No team—World War II				
1944–45	East Texas State	3–6	NA	NA	
1945–46	East Texas State	12–8	6–4	T–2nd	
East Texas State:		105–69	41–23		
Midwestern Indians (NAIA independent) (1956–1970)
1956–57	Midwestern	10–5			
1957–58	Midwestern	9–16			
1958–59	Midwestern	12–12			
1959–60	Midwestern	18–15			NAIA First Round
1960–61	Midwestern	12–16			
1961–62	Midwestern	22–5			
1962–63	Midwestern	17–8			
1963–64	Midwestern	20–6			
1964–65	Midwestern	28–6			NAIA Second Round
1965–66	Midwestern	26–6			NAIA Second Round
1966–67	Midwestern	21–11			NAIA Second Round
1967–68	Midwestern	19–9			NAIA District 8 Playoffs
1968–69	Midwestern	14–19			NAIA District 8 Playoffs
1969–70	Midwestern	18–11			
Midwestern:		246–145			
Total:		351–214			
National champion Postseason invitational champion Conference regular season champion Conference regular season and conference tournament champion Division regular season champion Division regular season and conference tournament champion Conference tournament champion

=== Baseball ===
Record table
Season	Team	Overall	Conference	Standing	Postseason
Tulane Green Wave (Southeastern Conference) (1952–1954)
1952	Tulane	14–5–1	11–4	2nd	
1953	Tulane	11–9	8–7	4th	
1954	Tulane	12–8	10–6	3rd	
Tulane:		37–22–1	29–17		
Total:		37–22–1			
