= 1943 Texas Longhorns football team =

American college football season

1943 Texas Longhorns football

SWC champion

Cotton Bowl Classic, T 7–7 vs. Randolph Field
- Conference: Southwest Conference

Ranking
- AP: No. 14
- Record: 7–1–1 (5–0 SWC)
- Head coach: Dana X. Bible (7th season)
- Home stadium: War Memorial Stadium

1943 Southwest Conference football standings
	Conf.					Overall
Team	W		L		T	W		L		T
No. 14 Texas $	5	–	0	–	0	7	–	1	–	1
Texas A&M	4	–	1	–	0	7	–	2	–	1
Rice	2	–	3	–	0	3	–	7	–	0
SMU	2	–	3	–	0	2	–	7	–	0
TCU	1	–	4	–	0	2	–	6	–	0
Arkansas	1	–	4	–	0	2	–	7	–	0
$ – Conference champion; Rankings from AP Poll

The 1943 Texas Longhorns football team was an American football team that represented the University of Texas (now known as the University of Texas at Austin) as a member of the Southwest Conference (SWC) during the 1943 college football season. In their seventh year under head coach Dana X. Bible, the Longhorns compiled an overall record of 7–1–1, with a mark of 5–0 in conference play, and finished as SWC champion. Texas concluded their season with a tie against Randolph Field in the Cotton Bowl Classic.

Before the season began, Tom Landry left the Longhorns and joined the Army Air Corps. In the final Litkenhous Ratings, Texas ranked 13th among the nation's college and service teams with a rating of 103.9.

== Schedule ==
Date	Time	Opponent	Rank	Site	Result	Attendance	Source
September 25	2:30 p.m.	Blackland AAF*		War Memorial Stadium; Austin, TX	W 65–6	9,000	
October 2		Southwestern (TX)*		War Memorial Stadium; Austin, TX	L 7–14		
October 9		vs. Oklahoma*		Cotton Bowl; Dallas, TX (rivalry)	W 13–7	18,500	
October 16		Arkansas		War Memorial Stadium; Austin, TX (rivalry)	W 34–0		
October 23		Rice	No. 16	War Memorial Stadium; Austin, TX (rivalry)	W 58–0		
October 30		at SMU	No. 12	Ownby Stadium; University Park, TX	W 20–0		
November 13		TCU	No. 16	War Memorial Stadium; Austin, TX (rivalry)	W 46–7	12,000	
November 25		at No. 16 Texas A&M	No. 12	Kyle Field; College Station, TX (rivalry)	W 27–13	32,000	
January 1, 1944		vs. Randolph Field*	No. 14	Cotton Bowl; Dallas, TX (Cotton Bowl Classic)	T 7–7	15,000	
*Non-conference game; Rankings from AP Poll released prior to the game; All times are in Central time

== Rankings ==
Ranking movements Legend: ██ Increase in ranking ██ Decrease in ranking — = Not ranked
	Week								
Poll	1	2	3	4	5	6	7	8	Final
AP	—	—	16	12	13	16	10	12	14

== Awards and honors ==
- Joe Parker, Cotton Bowl co-Most Valuable Player
