= 1943 Tulsa Golden Hurricane football team =

American college football season

1943 Tulsa Golden Hurricane football

MVC champion

Sugar Bowl, L 18–20 vs. Georgia Tech
- Conference: Missouri Valley Conference

Ranking
- AP: No. 15
- Record: 6–1–1 (1–0 MVC)
- Head coach: Henry Frnka (3rd season)
- Home stadium: Skelly Field

1943 Missouri Valley Conference football standings
	Conf.					Overall
Team	W		L		T	W		L		T
No. 15 Tulsa $	1	–	0	–	0	6	–	1	–	1
Oklahoma A&M	0	–	1	–	0	3	–	4	–	0
$ – Conference champion; Rankings from AP Poll

The 1943 Tulsa Golden Hurricane team represented the University of Tulsa during the 1943 college football season. In their third year under head coach Henry Frnka, the Golden Hurricane compiled a 6–0–1 record in the regular season, including lopsided victories over SMU (20–7), Texas Tech (34–7), Oklahoma (20–6), Utah (55–0), Oklahoma A&M (55–6), and Arkansas (61–0). They lost to Georgia Tech, 20–18, in the 1944 Sugar Bowl.

In the final Litkenhous Ratings, Tulsa ranked 29th among the nation's college and service teams with a rating of 91.7.

== Schedule ==
Date	Opponent	Rank	Site	Result	Attendance	Source
September 25	at SMU*		Ownby Stadium; University Park, TX	W 20–7	12,000	
October 9	Texas Tech*		Skelly Field; Tulsa, OK	W 34–7	13,000	
October 16	vs. Oklahoma*		Taft Stadium; Oklahoma City, OK	W 20–6	15,000	
October 23	Utah*		Skelly Field; Tulsa, OK	W 55–0	6,000	
October 30	Southwestern (TX)*	No. 13	Skelly Field; Tulsa, OK	T 6–6	10,000	
November 6	Oklahoma A&M^{†}	No. 19	Skelly Field; Tulsa, OK (rivalry)	W 55–6	9,000	
November 25	Arkansas*	No. 20	Skelly Field; Tulsa, OK	W 61–0	15,000	
January 1, 1944	vs. No. 13 Georgia Tech*	No. 15	Tulane Stadium; New Orleans, LA (Sugar Bowl)	L 18–20	69,134	
*Non-conference game; ^{†}Homecoming; Rankings from AP Poll released prior to the game

== Rankings ==
The AP released their first poll on October 4. The Golden Hurricane made their first appearance as a ranked team on October 25.

Ranking movements Legend: ██ Increase in ranking ██ Decrease in ranking — = Not ranked
	Week								
Poll	1	2	3	4	5	6	7	8	Final
AP	—	—	—	13	19	17	16	20	15

== After the season ==
=== 1944 NFL draft ===
The following Golden Hurricane players were selected in the 1944 NFL draft following the season.

Round	Pick	Player	Position	NFL club
3	17	Saxon Judd	End	Chicago Cardinals
6	51	C. B. Stanley	Tackle	Chicago Bears
11	107	Carl Buda	Guard	Pittsburgh Steelers
12	113	Sam Gray	End	Pittsburgh Steelers
13	121	Bobby Dobbs	Back	Chicago Cardinals
16	162	John Green	Defensive end	Philadelphia Eagles
28	293	Charlie Mitchell	Halfback	Chicago Bears
