= 1944 Sugar Bowl =

American college football game

- 10th Sugar Bowl
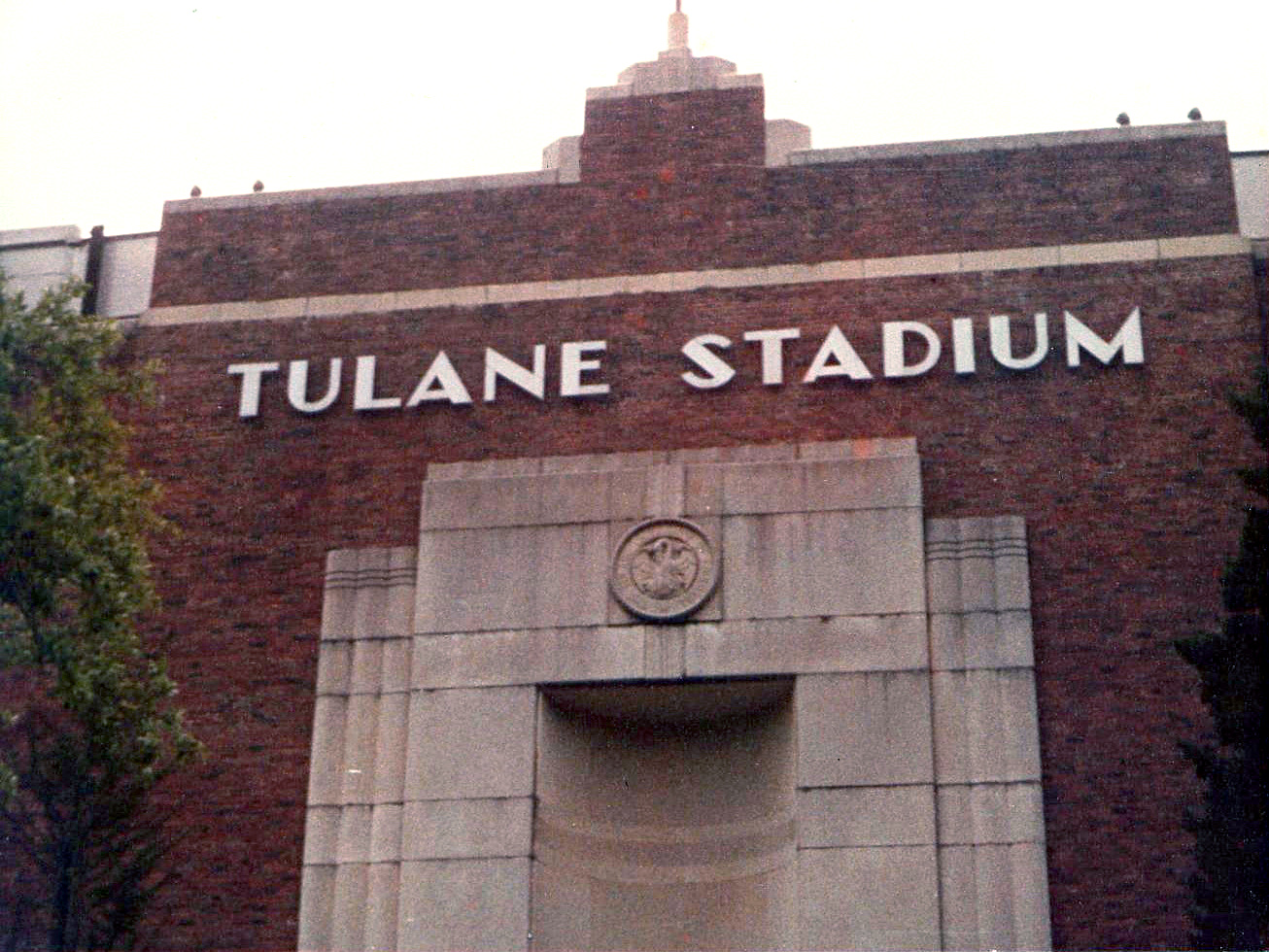
- Tulane Stadium in New Orleans, Louisiana, hosted the Sugar Bowl.
Georgia Tech Yellow Jackets	Tulsa Golden Hurricane
(7–3)	(6–0–1)
SEC	MVC
20	18
Head coach: William Alexander	Head coach: Henry Frnka
AP 13	AP 15
	1	2	3	4	Total
Georgia Tech	0	7	6	7	20
Tulsa	6	12	0	0	18
- Date: January 1, 1944
- Season: 1943
- Stadium: Tulane Stadium
- Location: New Orleans, Louisiana
- Referee: J. J. Lynch
- Attendance: 69,134

The 1944 Sugar Bowl was a college football bowl game played on January 1, 1944, at Tulane Stadium in New Orleans, Louisiana. It was the tenth playing of the Sugar Bowl. The Tulsa Golden Hurricane returned to the game for the second consecutive season and faced the Georgia Tech Yellow Jackets, who became the first team to have played in all four major bowls; they had previously participated in the 1929 Rose Bowl, the 1940 Orange Bowl, and the 1943 Cotton Bowl Classic. The Golden Hurricane had an 18–7 lead at halftime, but Georgia Tech roared back, scoring 13 unanswered points to win.

== Scoring summary ==
=== First quarter ===
- Tulsa: Ed Shedlosky 15-yard pass from Clyde LeForce (kick failed); 6–0 Tulsa

=== Second quarter ===
- Tulsa: Jimmy Ford 76-yard run (kick failed); 12–0 Tulsa
- GT: Frank Broyles 1-yard run (Eddie Prokop kick); 12–7 Tulsa
- Tulsa: LeForce 1-yard run (kick failed); 18–7 Tulsa

=== Third quarter ===
- GT: Phil Tinsley 46-yard pass from Prokop (kick failed); 18–13 Tulsa

=== Fourth quarter ===
- GT: Ed Scharfscherdt 1-yard run (Prokop kick); 20–18 Georgia Tech
