= 1943 Georgia Tech Yellow Jackets football team =

American college football season

1943 Georgia Tech Yellow Jackets football

SEC champion Sugar Bowl champion

Sugar Bowl, W 20–18 vs. Tulsa
- Conference: Southeastern Conference

Ranking
- AP: No. 13
- Record: 8–3 (3–0 SEC)
- Head coach: William Alexander (24th season)
- Captains: George Manning; John Steber
- Home stadium: Grant Field

1943 Southeastern Conference football standings
	Conf.					Overall
Team		W		L			W		L
No. 13 Georgia Tech $	3	–	0	–	0	8	–	3	–	0
LSU	2	–	2	–	0	6	–	3	–	0
Tulane	1	–	1	–	0	3	–	3	–	0
Georgia	0	–	3	–	0	6	–	4	–	0
Vanderbilt	0	–	0	–	0	5	–	0	–	0
$ – Conference champion; Seven other SEC schools did not field a team due to World War II.; Rankings from AP Poll

The 1943 Georgia Tech Yellow Jackets football team was an American football team that represented Georgia Tech as a member of the Southeastern Conference (SEC) during the 1943 college football season. In their 24th year under head coach William Alexander, the Yellow Jackets compiled an overall record of 8–3, with a conference record of 3–0, and finished as SEC champion.

In the final Litkenhous Ratings, Georgia Tech ranked ninth among the nation's college and service teams with a rating of 108.8.

== Schedule ==
Date	Time	Opponent	Rank	Site	Result	Attendance	Source
September 25		North Carolina*		Grant Field; Atlanta, GA	W 20–7	20,000	
October 2		at Notre Dame*		Notre Dame Stadium; South Bend, IN (rivalry)	L 13–55	26,497–30,000	
October 9		Georgia Pre-Flight*		Grant Field; Atlanta, GA	W 35–7	12,000	
October 16	3:00 p.m.	300th Infantry*		Grant Field; Atlanta, GA	W 27–0	10,000	
October 23		vs. No. 3 Navy*		Municipal Stadium; Baltimore, MD	L 14–28	56,223	
October 30		No. 8 Duke*		Grant Field; Atlanta, GA	L 7–14	30,000	
November 6		No. 20 LSU		Grant Field; Atlanta, GA	W 42–7	20,000	
November 13		at Tulane	No. 19	Tulane Stadium; New Orleans, LA	W 33–0	38,000	
November 20		Clemson*	No. 15	Grant Field; Atlanta, GA (rivalry)	W 41–6	10,000	
November 27		Georgia	No. 14	Grant Field; Atlanta, GA (rivalry)	W 48–0	28,000	
January 1		vs. No. 15 Tulsa*	No. 13	Tulane Stadium; New Orleans, LA (Sugar Bowl)	W 20–18	69,134	
*Non-conference game; Rankings from AP Poll released prior to the game; All times are in Eastern time

== Rankings ==
Ranking movements Legend: ██ Increase in ranking ██ Decrease in ranking — = Not ranked
	Week								
Poll	1	2	3	4	5	6	7	8	Final
AP	—	—	—	—	—	19	15	14	13
