= LSU–Texas A&M football rivalry =

American college football rivalry

- LSU Tigers Texas A&M Aggies
- First meeting: December 2, 1899; Texas A&M, 52–0
- Latest meeting: September 26, 2026; LSU, 35–6
- Next meeting: 2027

Statistics
- Total meetings: 65
- All-time series: LSU leads, 33–25–3
- Largest victory: Texas A&M, 63–9 (1914)
- Longest win streak: LSU, 6 (1960–1965)
- Current win streak: LSU, 1 (2026–present)

Locations of LSU and Texas A&M

The LSU–Texas A&M football rivalry, is an American college football rivalry between the LSU Tigers and Texas A&M Aggies.

== History ==
The majority of the pre-2012 games were non-conference; there was a five-game stretch from 1906 to 1914 when they were opponents in the Southern Intercollegiate Athletic Association (SIAA).

LSU has wins in the two bowl games where they were opponents: the 1944 Orange Bowl in Miami and 2011 Cotton Bowl Classic in Arlington. The schools have split the last eight of the last nine games, with the home team winning in each instance since 2017 until 2025 when A&M won in Baton Rouge.

=== Pre-SIAA/SIAA ===
The teams first played at College Station in 1899. A&M won 52–0. It was the only game before they joined the SIAA.

They did not meet again until 1906 in Baton Rouge, the first of five games between 1906 and 1914 in which they were opponents in the SIAA. They played two more times in 1913 and 1914. A&M went 3–1–1. After 1914, A&M left to join the newly formed Southwest Conference (LSU participated in initial meetings to form it, but chose not to join.)

=== SEC vs. SWC ===
They played two neutral-site games in 1916 and 1917 before four straight games from 1920 to 1923. Between 1916 and 1923, A&M went 3–2–1. The series resumed from 1942 to 1949 in the regular season. In addition to the regular season game in 1943, they met in the first bowl game of the rivalry. LSU won the January 1, 1944, Orange Bowl 19–14. LSU went 7–2, winning the last five.

They met again in 1955 and 1956, with A&M taking both games. They were led by John David Crow, their first Heisman Trophy winner. They played annually from 1960 to 1975, with all games in Baton Rouge to allow A&M to earn a larger gate than it would have realized by hosting the Tigers in College Station. This was the longest consecutive games played between the two teams in the series history. LSU went 12–3–1. After 1961, LSU took the lead in the series; LSU still leads the series today. A&M's 1970 win had a 79-yard touchdown pass with 13 seconds left to upset LSU (who would win the SEC title). A&M did not win another game that year and finished 2–9.

The series resumed from 1986 to 1995 as a home-and-home (Baton Rouge in even-numbered years, College Station in odd-numbered years). A&M went 6–4, winning the last five, including blowouts of 45–7 in 1991 and 24–0 in 1993. Four of those five were over LSU head coach Curley Hallman, a starting defensive back on the Aggies' 1967 Southwest Conference championship team and Aggie assistant coach from 1982 to 1987. R. C. Slocum, a native Louisianian, was A&M's head coach for the last seven meetings in that 10-year series.

=== SEC vs. Big 12 ===
They did not meet again until January 7, 2011, in the Cotton Bowl Classic. It was the only meeting during the Aggies' tenure in the Big 12 Conference, and the second time in a bowl game. In 2011, the Cotton Bowl celebrated its 75th anniversary, and this was the first Cotton Bowl Classic to be played in prime time in the highly anticipated match-up. LSU beat Texas A&M in the Cotton Bowl 41–24 at Arlington, Texas.

=== SEC ===
The series resumed in 2012, and for the first time since the SIAA days they would be conference opponents, when A&M joined the SEC and was placed in the West Division with LSU.

In 2012, A&M's Johnny Manziel won the Heisman. LSU's defense caused him to have his worst performance of the year, which included 0 touchdowns and 3 interceptions. #6 LSU won 24–19 at College Station in the first SEC game. In 2013, #22 LSU won 34–10, A&M's first SEC road loss.

Prior to the 2014 season, the Southeastern Conference rearranged LSU's schedule, moving its traditional year-end game against Arkansas to earlier in November and placing Texas A&M at the end of the Tigers' schedule. The Aggies' fellow SEC newcomer, Missouri, was assigned as Arkansas' opponent for the regular-season finale.

In 2014, they played on Thanksgiving night for the first time in the series history. The last time LSU played on Thanksgiving was 1973. LSU won 23–17 in College Station.

Prior to the 2015 meeting, rumors swirled that LSU coach Les Miles would be fired following the game and replaced by then-Florida State coach Jimbo Fisher. Following the Tigers' 19–7 victory at home, LSU athletic director Joe Alleva announced Miles would be retained. However, Miles was fired on September 25, 2016, hours after LSU lost 18–13 at Auburn. Les Miles was 5–0 vs Texas A&M. Defensive line coach Ed Orgeron was named as LSU's interim head coach.

Heading into the 2016 meeting on Thanksgiving at College Station, it was reported Alleva would name then-University of Houston coach Tom Herman as Miles' permanent successor. Alleva changed course after LSU won 54–39, giving Orgeron the job full-time less than 48 hours later.

The rivalry was ratcheted up a notch in 2018 when the Aggies hired former LSU offensive coordinator Jimbo Fisher as head coach, luring him from Florida State with a 10-year, $75 million contract. Fisher was on Nick Saban's staff in 2003 when LSU won the first of its three national championships of the 21st century, and later led the Seminoles to the 2013 national title.

In 2018, Texas A&M beat LSU 74–72 at Kyle Field for their first win over the Tigers since 1995. This set an NCAA FBS record for most points scored in a single game and tied an NCAA record for playing in 7 overtime periods.

LSU exacted revenge in the 2019 meeting at Baton Rouge, beating the Aggies 50–7 to wrap up an undefeated regular season. The Tigers went on to win their fourth national championship, defeating Oklahoma 63–28 at the Peach Bowl in the semifinals and Clemson 42–25 in the championship game. However, Texas A&M won 20–7 in Kyle Field in 2020. In 2021, LSU upset Texas A&M 27–24 to become bowl eligible, in coach Ed Orgeron's final game at LSU. Then, a year later, in 2022, the Aggies returned the favor, later upsetting LSU, who entered the game as the number 5 team in the nation, by a score of 38–23. Despite the win, A&M finished the season 5–7, making it the first losing season since 2009, and therefore making A&M ineligible for a bowl game for the first time since 2008. The Tigers would once again get revenge on the Aggies in 2023. Despite being down by 10 at halftime, the Tigers would pull away from the Aggies and end up winning 42–30.

In 2024, with the addition of Texas and Oklahoma to the SEC, the rivalry was no longer held during rivalry week. Texas revived the historical series with the Aggies at the end of the year, and Oklahoma became the Tigers' new end-of-year opponent. Even with the new slot outside rivalry week, the game was not without drama, as despite being up 17–7 at halftime, the Tigers would allow the Aggies to outscore the Tigers 31–6 in the 2nd half; forcing LSU Quarterback Garrett Nussmeier into 3 interceptions while also being sacked twice. The comeback was also led by a quarterback change in the 3rd quarter, with the Texas A&M head coach Mike Elko benching starter Conner Weigman in favor of Marcel Reed. Reed would complete 2/2 passes for 70 yards, while rushing for 62 yards for 3 touchdowns. The Aggies would upset the 8th ranked LSU Tigers by a score of 38–23.

In 2025, the #3 Aggies travelled to Baton Rouge to play the #20 Tigers. Down 18–14 at halftime, the Aggies went on a 35–0 run before LSU scored a touchdown with less than a minute remaining. The 49–25 win for the Aggies was their first in Baton Rouge since 1994 breaking a six game away losing streak against the Tigers. Brian Kelly was fired the following day, with LSU having to pay his full $54 million buyout.

With the SEC adopting a nine-game conference schedule starting in 2026, Texas A&M vs. LSU will remain a protected rivalry, with annual games until 2029.

== Game results ==
LSU victories	Texas A&M victories	Ties	Vacated wins

No.	Date	Location	Winner	Score
1	December 2, 1899	College Station, TX	Texas A&M	52–0
2	November 19, 1906	Baton Rouge, LA	Texas A&M	22–12
3	October 21, 1907	College Station, TX	Texas A&M	11–5
4	October 17, 1908	New Orleans, LA	LSU	26–0
5	November 27, 1913	Houston, TX	Tie	7–7
6	October 31, 1914	Dallas, TX	Texas A&M	63–9
7	October 14, 1916	Galveston, TX	LSU	13–0
8	October 27, 1917	San Antonio, TX	Texas A&M	27–0
9	October 16, 1920	College Station, TX	Tie	0–0
10	October 15, 1921	Baton Rouge, LA	LSU	6–0
11	October 20, 1922	College Station, TX	Texas A&M	46–0
12	October 20, 1923	Baton Rouge, LA	Texas A&M	28–0
13	September 26, 1942	Baton Rouge, LA	LSU	16–7
14	October 9, 1943	Baton Rouge, LA	#17 Texas A&M	28–13
15	January 1, 1944	Miami, FL	#20 LSU	19–14
16	October 14, 1944	Baton Rouge, LA	Texas A&M	7–0
17	October 13, 1945	Baton Rouge, LA	LSU	31–12
18	October 12, 1946	Baton Rouge, LA	LSU	33–9
19	October 11, 1947	Baton Rouge, LA	LSU	19–13
20	October 9, 1948	Baton Rouge, LA	LSU	14–13
21	October 8, 1949	Baton Rouge, LA	LSU	34–0
22	September 24, 1955	Dallas, TX	Texas A&M	28–0
23	September 29, 1956	Baton Rouge, LA	#11 Texas A&M	9–6
24	September 17, 1960	Baton Rouge, LA	LSU	9–0
25	September 30, 1961	Baton Rouge, LA	LSU	16–7
26	September 22, 1962	Baton Rouge, LA	#5 LSU	21–0
27	September 21, 1963	Baton Rouge, LA	LSU	14–6
28	September 19, 1964	Baton Rouge, LA	LSU	9–6
29	September 18, 1965	Baton Rouge, LA	#8 LSU	21–0
30	October 8, 1966	Baton Rouge, LA	Tie	7–7
31	September 30, 1967	Baton Rouge, LA	LSU	17–6
32	September 21, 1968	Baton Rouge, LA	#20 LSU	13–12
33	September 20, 1969	Baton Rouge, LA	LSU	35–6
34	September 19, 1970	Baton Rouge, LA	Texas A&M	20–18

No.	Date	Location	Winner	Score
35	September 18, 1971	Baton Rouge, LA	LSU	37–0
36	September 23, 1972	Baton Rouge, LA	#8 LSU	42–17
37	September 22, 1973	Baton Rouge, LA	#11 LSU	28–23
38	September 21, 1974	Baton Rouge, LA	Texas A&M	21–14
39	September 20, 1975	Baton Rouge, LA	#11 Texas A&M	39–8
40	September 13, 1986	Baton Rouge, LA	#15 LSU	35–17
41	September 5, 1987	College Station, TX	#6 LSU	17–3
42	September 3, 1988	Baton Rouge, LA	#17 LSU	27–0
43	September 2, 1989	College Station, TX	Texas A&M	28–16
44	September 29, 1990	Baton Rouge, LA	LSU	17–8
45	September 14, 1991	College Station, TX	#20 Texas A&M	45–7
46	September 5, 1992	Baton Rouge, LA	#7 Texas A&M	31–22
47	September 4, 1993	College Station, TX	#5 Texas A&M	24–0
48	September 3, 1994	Baton Rouge, LA	#15 Texas A&M	18–13
49	September 2, 1995	College Station, TX	#3 Texas A&M	33–17
50	January 7, 2011	Arlington, TX	#11 LSU	41–24
51	October 20, 2012	College Station, TX	#6 LSU *	24–19
52	November 23, 2013	Baton Rouge, LA	#22 LSU *	34–10
53	November 27, 2014	College Station, TX	LSU *	23–17
54	November 28, 2015	Baton Rouge, LA	LSU *	19–7
55	November 24, 2016	College Station, TX	#25 LSU	54–39
56	November 25, 2017	Baton Rouge, LA	#18 LSU	45–21
57	November 24, 2018	College Station, TX	#22 Texas A&M	74–72^{7OT}
58	November 30, 2019	Baton Rouge, LA	#1 LSU	50–7
59	November 28, 2020	College Station, TX	#5 Texas A&M	20–7
60	November 27, 2021	Baton Rouge, LA	LSU	27–24
61	November 26, 2022	College Station, TX	Texas A&M	38–23
62	November 25, 2023	Baton Rouge, LA	#14 LSU	42–30
63	October 26, 2024	College Station, TX	#14 Texas A&M	38–23
64	October 25, 2025	Baton Rouge, LA	#3 Texas A&M	49–25
65	September 26, 2026	Baton Rouge, LA	#10 LSU	35–6
Series: LSU leads 33–25–3
* Vacated by LSU

== See also ==
- List of NCAA college football rivalry games
